= List of members of the Storting, 1989–1993 =

List of all members of Stortinget in the period 1989 to 1993. The list includes all who were elected to Stortinget.

There were a total of 165 representatives, distributed among 63 to the Norwegian Labour Party, 37 to Conservative Party, 22 to Progress Party, 17 to Socialist Left Party, 14 to Christian Democrats, 11 to Centre Party and 1 to Framtid for Finnmark.

The 8 the leveling seats went to Akershus (3), Hordaland (1), Oslo (1), Rogaland (2) and Østfold (1).

== Aust-Agder ==
Name	Party	Comments/Suppleants
Brit Hoel	Norwegian Labour Party	
Tore A. Liltved	Conservative Party	
Jens Marcussen	Progress Party	
Helga Haugen	Christian Democrats	

== Vest-Agder ==
Name	Party	Comments/Suppleants
Sigurd Verdal	Norwegian Labour Party	
John G. Bernander	Conservative Party	
Jon Lilletun	Christian Democrats	
Vidar Kleppe	Progress Party	
Aud Blattmann	Norwegian Labour Party	

== Akershus ==
3 Leveling seats.

Name	Party	Comments/Suppleants
Jo Benkow	Conservative Party	
Reiulf Steen	Norwegian Labour Party	Appointed ambassador to Chile in July 1992. Was replaced by Harald Løbak Thoresen and later Solveig Torsvik.
Fridtjof Frank Gundersen	Progress Party	
Kaci Kullmann Five	Conservative Party	
Helen Marie Bøsterud	Norwegian Labour Party	
Tora Aasland	Socialist Left Party	
Jan Petersen	Conservative Party	
Thor-Eirik Gulbrandsen	Norwegian Labour Party	
Finn Thoresen	Progress Party	Independent as of November 2, 1992
Eva R. Finstad	Conservative Party	
Anneliese Dørum	Norwegian Labour Party	
Tore Haugen	Conservative Party	
Paul Chaffey	Socialist Left Party	
Anne Enger Lahnstein	Centre Party	
Jan Erik Fåne	Progress Party	

== Buskerud ==
Name	Party	Comments/Suppleants
Erik Dalheim	Norwegian Labour Party	
Hallgrim Berg	Conservative Party	
Kirsti Kolle Grøndahl	Norwegian Labour Party	
Steinar Maribo	Progress Party	
Arild Hiim	Conservative Party	
Trond Jensrud	Norwegian Labour Party	
Åse Klundelien	Norwegian Labour Party	

== Finnmark ==
Name	Party	Comments/Suppleants
Oddrunn Pettersen	Norwegian Labour Party	
Anders John Aune	Framtid for Finnmark	
Karl Eirik Schjøtt-Pedersen	Norwegian Labour Party	
Reidar Johansen	Socialist Left Party	

== Hedmark ==
Name	Party	Comments/Suppleants
Kjell Borgen	Norwegian Labour Party	
Eirin Faldet	Norwegian Labour Party	
Sigbjørn Johnsen	Norwegian Labour Party	
Johan C. Løken	Conservative Party	
Magnar Sortåsløkken	Socialist Left Party	
Sylvia Brustad	Norwegian Labour Party	
Ragnhild Queseth Haarstad	Centre Party	
Einar Olav Skogholt	Norwegian Labour Party	

== Hordaland ==
1 Leveling seat.

Name	Party	Comments/Suppleants
Hallvard Bakke	Norwegian Labour Party	
Arne Skauge	Conservative Party	
Hans J. Røsjorde	Progress Party	
Grete Knudsen	Norwegian Labour Party	
Svein Alsaker	Christian Democrats	
Arne Alsåker Spilde	Conservative Party	
Kjellbjørg Lunde	Socialist Left Party	
Leiv Stensland	Norwegian Labour Party	
Knut Hanselmann	Progress Party	
Erna Solberg	Conservative Party	
Ranveig Frøiland	Norwegian Labour Party	
Britt Harkestad	Christian Democrats	
Magnus Stangeland	Centre Party	
Olav Akselsen	Norwegian Labour Party	
Nils O. Golten	Conservative Party	
Inger-Marie Ytterhorn	Progress Party	

== Møre and Romsdal ==
Name	Party	Comments/Suppleants
Rikard Olsvik	Norwegian Labour Party	
Anders Talleraas	Conservative Party	
Kjell Magne Bondevik	Christian Democrats	
Laila Kaland	Norwegian Labour Party	
Lodve Solholm	Progress Party	
Ingvard Sverdrup	Conservative Party	
Gudmund Restad	Centre Party	
Karita Bekkemellem Orheim	Norwegian Labour Party	
Marie Lovise Widnes	Socialist Left Party	
Per Rolf Sævik	Christian Democrats	

== Nordland ==
Name	Party	Comments/Suppleants
Bjarne Mørk-Eidem	Norwegian Labour Party	
Petter Thomassen	Conservative Party	
Ragna Berget Jørgensen	Norwegian Labour Party	
Inge Myrvoll	Socialist Left Party	
Rolf Bendiksen	Norwegian Labour Party	
Harry Jensen	Progress Party	Died in December 1990. Was replaced by Karl Sørmo.
Thea Knutzen	Conservative Party	
Åshild Hauan	Norwegian Labour Party	
Lisbeth Holand	Socialist Left Party	
Dag Jostein Fjærvoll	Christian Democrats	
Peter Angelsen	Centre Party	
Inger Pedersen	Norwegian Labour Party	

== Oppland ==
Name	Party	Comments/Suppleants
Haakon Blankenborg	Norwegian Labour Party	
Berit Brørby	Norwegian Labour Party	
Johan M. Nyland	Norwegian Labour Party	
Syver Berge	Centre Party	
Dag C. Weberg	Conservative Party	
Marie Brenden	Norwegian Labour Party	
Peder I. Ramsrud	Progress Party	

== Oslo ==
1 Leveling seat.

Name	Party	Comments/Suppleants
Jan P. Syse	Conservative Party	Prime Minister from 1989 to 1990; Oddmund Hammerstad met in his place.
Gro Harlem Brundtland	Norwegian Labour Party	
Carl I. Hagen	Progress Party	
Annelise Høegh	Conservative Party	
Thorbjørn Berntsen	Norwegian Labour Party	
Theo Koritzinsky	Socialist Left Party	
Per-Kristian Foss	Conservative Party	
Sissel Rønbeck	Norwegian Labour Party	
Pål Atle Skjervengen	Progress Party	
Anders C. Sjaastad	Conservative Party	
Bjørn Tore Godal	Norwegian Labour Party	
Kristin Halvorsen	Socialist Left Party	
Kristin Clemet	Conservative Party	
Marit Nybakk	Norwegian Labour Party	
Tor Mikkel Wara	Progress Party	
Eleonore Bjartveit	Christian Democrats	

== Rogaland ==
2 Leveling seats.

Name	Party	Comments/Suppleants
Gunnar Berge	Norwegian Labour Party	
Gunnar Fatland	Conservative Party	
Jan Simonsen	Progress Party	
John S. Tveit	Christian Democrats	
Gunn Vigdis Olsen-Hagen	Norwegian Labour Party	Died in December 1989. Was replaced by Kari Helliesen.
Thorhild Widvey	Conservative Party	
Ole Gabriel Ueland	Centre Party	
Magnar Sætre	Norwegian Labour Party	
Eilef A. Meland	Socialist Left Party	
Petter Bjørheim	Progress Party	
Borghild Røyseland	Christian Democrats	
Sverre Mauritzen	Conservative Party	Left in September 1993. Was replaced by Olaf Aurdal.

== Sogn and Fjordane ==
Name	Party	Comments/Suppleants
Kjell Opseth	Norwegian Labour Party	
Leiv Blakset	Centre Party	
Dagfinn Hjertenes	Conservative Party	
Lars Gunnar Lie	Christian Democrats	
Astrid Marie Nistad	Norwegian Labour Party	

== Telemark ==
Name	Party	Comments/Suppleants
Ingeborg Botnen	Norwegian Labour Party	
Ragnhild Barland	Norwegian Labour Party	
Ingvald Godal	Conservative Party	
Børre Rønningen	Socialist Left Party	
John I. Alvheim	Progress Party	
Solveig Sollie	Christian Democrats	

== Troms ==
Name	Party	Comments/Suppleants
William Engseth	Norwegian Labour Party	
Svein Ludvigsen	Conservative Party	
Ranja Hauglid	Norwegian Labour Party	
Rolf Ketil Bjørn	Socialist Left Party	
Terje Nyberget	Progress Party	
Jan Elvheim	Norwegian Labour Party	

== Nord-Trøndelag ==
Name	Party	Comments/Suppleants
Inger Lise Gjørv	Norwegian Labour Party	
Johan J. Jakobsen	Centre Party	
Roger Gudmundseth	Norwegian Labour Party	
Per Aunet	Socialist Left Party	
Wenche Frogn Sellæg	Conservative Party	
Inge Staldvik	Norwegian Labour Party	Independent as of December 15, 1992, SV from January 13, 1993.

== Sør-Trøndelag ==
Name	Party	Comments/Suppleants
Marit Rotnes	Norwegian Labour Party	
Harald Ellefsen	Conservative Party	
Ulf Guttormsen	Norwegian Labour Party	
Erik Solheim	Socialist Left Party	
Mary Kvidal	Norwegian Labour Party	
Siri Frost Sterri	Conservative Party	
Per Risvik	Progress Party	
Tove Kari Viken	Centre Party	
Kåre Gjønnes	Christian Democrats	
Gunhild Øyangen	Norwegian Labour Party	

== Vestfold ==
Name	Party	Comments/Suppleants
Ernst Wroldsen	Norwegian Labour Party	
Ole Johs. Brunæs	Conservative Party	
Oscar D. Hillgaar	Progress Party	
Karin Lian	Norwegian Labour Party	
Ingrid I. Willoch	Conservative Party	
Jørgen Kosmo	Norwegian Labour Party	
Inger Dag Steen	Socialist Left Party	

== Østfold ==
1 Leveling seat.

Name	Party	Comments/Suppleants
Gunnar Skaug	Norwegian Labour Party	
Sigurd Holemark	Conservative Party	
Tom Thoresen	Norwegian Labour Party	
Øystein Hedstrøm	Progress Party	
Åsa Solberg Iversen	Norwegian Labour Party	
Wenche Lyngholm	Socialist Left Party	
Kjellaug Nakkim	Conservative Party	
Odd Holten	Christian Democrats	
Edvard Grimstad	Centre Party	
