= List of members of the Storting, 1993–1997 =

List of all members of Stortinget in the period 1993 to 1997. The list includes all who were elected.

There were a total of 165 representatives, distributed among 67 to the Norwegian Labour Party, 32 to Centre Party, 28 to Conservative Party, 13 to Socialist Left Party, 13 to Christian Democrats, 10 to Progress Party (Norway), and 1 to Red Electoral Alliance.

Eight leveling seats were shared among Akershus (2), Buskerud (1), Oslo (2), Rogaland (1) and Telemark (2).

== Aust-Agder ==
Name	Party	Comments
Brit Hoel	Norwegian Labour Party	
Terje Sandkjær	Centre Party	
Gunnar Halvorsen	Norwegian Labour Party	
Tore A. Liltved	Conservative Party	

== Vest-Agder ==
Name	Party	Comments
Aud Blattmann	Norwegian Labour Party	
Jon Lilletun	Christian Democrats	
Sigurd Manneråk	Centre Party	
Ansgar Gabrielsen	Conservative Party	
Rolf Terje Klungland	Norwegian Labour Party	

== Akershus ==
2 leveling seats.

Name	Party	Comments
Anneliese Dørum	Norwegian Labour Party	
Kaci Kullmann Five	Conservative Party	
Solveig Torsvik	Norwegian Labour Party	
Jan Petersen	Conservative Party	
Anne Enger Lahnstein	Centre Party	
Vidar Bjørnstad	Norwegian Labour Party	
Fridtjof Frank Gundersen	Progress Party (Norway)	
Kjell Engebretsen	Norwegian Labour Party	
Eva R. Finstad	Conservative Party	
Paul Chaffey	Socialist Left Party	
Grethe Fossli	Norwegian Labour Party	
Jan Tore Sanner	Conservative Party	
Valgerd Svarstad Haugland	Christian Democrats	
Stephen Bråthen	Progress Party (Norway)	

== Buskerud ==
1 leveling seat.

Name	Party	Comments
Thorbjørn Jagland	Norwegian Labour Party	
Kirsti Kolle Grøndahl	Norwegian Labour Party	
Hallgrim Berg	Conservative Party	
Per Olaf Lundteigen	Centre Party	
Erik Dalheim	Norwegian Labour Party	
Sigrun Eng	Norwegian Labour Party	
Arild Hiim	Conservative Party	
Roy N. Wetterstad	Progress Party (Norway)	

== Finnmark ==
Name	Party	Comments
Karl Eirik Schjøtt-Pedersen	Norwegian Labour Party	
Johanne Gaup	Centre Party	
Mimmi Bæivi	Norwegian Labour Party	
Reidar Johansen	Socialist Left Party	

== Hedmark ==
Name	Party	Comments
Sigbjørn Johnsen	Norwegian Labour Party	
Sylvia Brustad	Norwegian Labour Party	
Ragnhild Queseth Haarstad	Centre Party	
Eirin Faldet	Norwegian Labour Party	
Magnar Sortåsløkken	Socialist Left Party	
Ola D. Gløtvold	Centre Party	
Einar Olav Skogholt	Norwegian Labour Party	
Bjørn Hernæs	Conservative Party	

== Hordaland ==
Name	Party	Comments
Hallvard Bakke	Norwegian Labour Party	
Magnus Stangeland	Centre Party	
Oddvard Nilsen	Conservative Party	
Grete Knudsen	Norwegian Labour Party	
Are Næss	Christian Democrats	
Ranveig Frøiland	Norwegian Labour Party	
Bjørg Hope Galtung	Centre Party	
Erna Solberg	Conservative Party	
Kjellbjørg Lunde	Socialist Left Party	
Olav Akselsen	Norwegian Labour Party	
Lars Sponheim	Venstre	
Hans J. Røsjorde	Progress Party (Norway)	
Rita Tveiten	Norwegian Labour Party	
John Dale	Centre Party	
Anita Apelthun Sæle	Christian Democrats	

== Møre og Romsdal ==
Name	Party	Comments
Laila Kaland	Norwegian Labour Party	
Gudmund Restad	Centre Party	
Asmund Kristoffersen	Norwegian Labour Party	
Kjell Magne Bondevik	Christian Democrats	
Anders Talleraas	Conservative Party	
Jørgen Holte	Centre Party	
Karita Bekkemellem Orheim	Norwegian Labour Party	
Eli Sollied Øveraas	Centre Party	
May-Helen Molvær Grimstad	Christian Democrats	
Ottar Kaldhol	Norwegian Labour Party	Appointed state secretary from 1993 to 1994, during which time he was replaced by Kjell Terje Fevåg.

== Nordland ==
Name	Party	Comments
Gunnar Breimo	Norwegian Labour Party	
Peter Angelsen	Centre Party	
Hill-Marta Solberg	Norwegian Labour Party	
Lisbeth Holand	Socialist Left Party	
Petter Thomassen	Conservative Party	
Inga Kvalbukt	Centre Party	
Ragna Berget Jørgensen	Norwegian Labour Party	
Odd Eriksen	Norwegian Labour Party	
Odd Roger Enoksen	Centre Party	
Dag Jostein Fjærvoll	Christian Democrats	
Inge Myrvoll	Socialist Left Party	
Tomas Norvoll	Norwegian Labour Party	

== Oppland ==
Name	Party	Comments
Haakon Blankenborg	Norwegian Labour Party	
Syver Berge	Centre Party	
Berit Brørby	Norwegian Labour Party	
Johan M. Nyland	Norwegian Labour Party	
Marit Tingelstad	Centre Party	
Marie Brenden	Norwegian Labour Party	
Dag C. Weberg	Conservative Party	

== Oslo ==
2 leveling seats.

Name	Party	Comments
Gro Harlem Brundtland	Norwegian Labour Party	
Jan P. Syse	Conservative Party	Died in September 1997. Was replaced by Børre Rognlien.
Thorbjørn Berntsen	Norwegian Labour Party	
Per-Kristian Foss	Conservative Party	
Jens Stoltenberg	Norwegian Labour Party	
Carl I. Hagen	Progress Party (Norway)	
Annelise Høegh	Conservative Party	
Marit Nybakk	Norwegian Labour Party	
Erik Solheim	Socialist Left Party	
Bjørn Tore Godal	Norwegian Labour Party	
Kristin Krohn Devold	Conservative Party	
Erling Folkvord	Red Electoral Alliance	
Grete Faremo	Norwegian Labour Party	
Arne Haukvik	Centre Party	
Anders C. Sjaastad	Conservative Party	
Ellen Chr. Christiansen	Progress Party (Norway)	
Kristin Halvorsen	Socialist Left Party	

== Rogaland ==
1 leveling seat.

Name	Party	Comments
Tore Nordtun	Norwegian Labour Party	
Magnhild Meltveit Kleppa	Centre Party	
Gunnar Fatland	Conservative Party	
Einar Steensnæs	Christian Democrats	
Oddbjørg Ausdal Starrfelt	Norwegian Labour Party	
Unn Aarrestad	Centre Party	
Magnar Sætre	Norwegian Labour Party	
Jan Simonsen	Progress Party (Norway)	
Thorhild Widvey	Conservative Party	
Hilde Frafjord Johnson	Christian Democrats	
Eilef A. Meland	Socialist Left Party	

== Sogn and Fjordane ==
Name	Party	Comments
Kjell Opseth	Norwegian Labour Party	
Jorunn Ringstad	Centre Party	
Astrid Marie Nistad	Norwegian Labour Party	
Håkon Steinar Giil	Centre Party	
Lars Gunnar Lie	Christian Democrats	

== Telemark ==
2 leveling seats.

Name	Party	Comments
Ragnhild Barland	Norwegian Labour Party	
Sigvald Oppebøen Hansen	Norwegian Labour Party	
Terje Riis-Johansen	Centre Party	
Bent Hegna	Norwegian Labour Party	
Ingvald Godal	Conservative Party	
Solveig Sollie	Christian Democrats	
Børre Rønningen	Socialist Left Party	
John I. Alvheim	Progress Party (Norway)	

== Troms ==
Name	Party	Comments
William Engseth	Norwegian Labour Party	
Tor Nymo	Centre Party	
Ranja Hauglid	Norwegian Labour Party	
Svein Ludvigsen	Conservative Party	
Rolf Ketil Bjørn	Socialist Left Party	Vararepresentant Sylvi Bratten
Rita H. Roaldsen	Centre Party	

== Nord-Trøndelag ==
Name	Party	Comments
Roger Gudmundseth	Norwegian Labour Party	
Johan J. Jakobsen	Centre Party	
Aud Gaundal	Norwegian Labour Party	
Marit Arnstad	Centre Party	
Jon Olav Alstad	Norwegian Labour Party	
Jorunn Hageler	Socialist Left Party	

== Sør-Trøndelag ==
Name	Party	Comments
Gunhild Øyangen	Norwegian Labour Party	
Ulf Guttormsen	Norwegian Labour Party	
Tove Kari Viken	Centre Party	
Harald Ellefsen	Conservative Party	
Ola Røtvei	Norwegian Labour Party	
Øystein Djupedal	Socialist Left Party	
Morten Lund	Centre Party	
Gunn Karin Gjul	Norwegian Labour Party	
Siri Frost Sterri	Conservative Party	
Ola T. Lånke	Christian Democrats	

== Vestfold ==
Name	Party	Comments
Jørgen Kosmo	Norwegian Labour Party	
Ole Johs. Brunæs	Conservative Party	
Karin Lian	Norwegian Labour Party	
Eva Lian	Centre Party	
Arild Lund	Conservative Party	
Oscar D. Hillgaar	Progress Party (Norway)	
Anne Helen Rui	Norwegian Labour Party	

== Østfold ==
Name	Party	Comments
Gunnar Skaug	Norwegian Labour Party	
Ane Sofie Tømmerås	Norwegian Labour Party	
Edvard Grimstad	Centre Party	
Kjellaug Nakkim	Conservative Party	
Tom Thoresen	Norwegian Labour Party	
Odd Holten	Christian Democrats	
Signe Øye	Norwegian Labour Party	
Øystein Hedstrøm	Progress Party (Norway)	
