= Oppland (Storting constituency) =

Constituency of the Storting, the national legislature of Norway

- Constituency for the Storting
- Location of Oppland within Norway
- Municipality: List: Dovre; Etnedal; Gausdal; Gjøvik; Gran; Lesja; Lillehammer; Lom; Nord-Aurdal; Nord-Fron; Nordre Land; Østre Toten; Øyer; Øystre Slidre; Ringebu; Sel; Skjåk; Søndre Land; Sør-Aurdal; Sør-Fron; Vågå; Vang; Vestre Slidre; Vestre Toten
- County: Innlandet
- Population: 174,591 (2025)
- Electorate: 133,306 (2025)
- Area: 24,675 km^{2} (2025)

Current constituency
- Created: 1921
- Seats: List: 5 (2021–present); 6 (2005–2021); 7 (1953–2005); 6 (1921–1953)
- Members of the Storting: List: Bengt Fasteraune (Sp); Anne Lise Fredlund (SV); Anne Hagenborg (Ap); Finn Krokeide (FrP); Lars Rem (FrP); Rune Støstad (Ap)
- Created from: List: Hadeland and Land; North Gudbrandsdalen; South Gudbrandsdalen; Toten; Valdres

Oppland is one of the 19 multi-member constituencies of the Storting, the national legislature of Norway. The constituency was established as Opland in 1921 following the introduction of proportional representation for elections to the Storting. Its spelling was settled as Oppland in 1950. It consists of the municipalities of Dovre, Etnedal, Gausdal, Gjøvik, Gran, Lesja, Lillehammer, Lom, Nord-Aurdal, Nord-Fron, Nordre Land, Østre Toten, Øyer, Øystre Slidre, Ringebu, Sel, Skjåk, Søndre Land, Sør-Aurdal, Sør-Fron, Vågå, Vang, Vestre Slidre, and Vestre Toten in the county of Innlandet. The constituency currently elects five of the 169 members of the Storting using the open party-list proportional representation electoral system. At the 2025 parliamentary election it had 133,306 registered electors.

== Electoral system ==
Oppland currently elects five of the 169 members of the Storting using the open (Note: Although technically elections to the Storting have open lists, they are in effect closed lists as a majority of those voting for a party must make changes to the lists for the changes to take effect, which has never happened since the introduction of proportional representation in 1921, and as result candidates are elected in the order submitted by the party.) party-list proportional representation electoral system. Constituency seats are allocated by the County Electoral Committee using the Modified Sainte-Laguë method. Compensatory seats (seats at large or levelling seats) are calculated based on the national vote and are allocated by the National Electoral Committee using the Modified Sainte-Laguë method at the constituency level (one for each constituency). Only parties that reach the 4% national threshold compete for compensatory seats.

== Election results ==
=== Summary ===
Election	Communists K			Reds R / RV / FMS			Socialist Left SV / SF			Labour Ap			Greens MDG			Centre Sp / Bp / L			Liberals V			Christian Democrats KrF			Conservatives H			Progress FrP / ALP		
Election	Votes	%	Seats	Votes	%	Seats	Votes	%	Seats	Votes	%	Seats	Votes	%	Seats	Votes	%	Seats	Votes	%	Seats	Votes	%	Seats	Votes	%	Seats	Votes	%	Seats
2025				4,584	4.47%	0	4,640	4.53%	0	34,045	33.22%	2	2,954	2.88%	0	16,172	15.78%	1	2,215	2.16%	0	2,270	2.21%	0	9,445	9.21%	0	21,908	21.37%	2
2021				3,534	3.58%	0	5,508	5.58%	0	34,552	35.02%	2	2,289	2.32%	0	25,619	25.97%	2	2,370	2.40%	0	1,537	1.56%	0	12,323	12.49%	1	8,459	8.57%	0
2017				1,823	1.68%	0	5,028	4.63%	0	38,056	35.07%	2	2,550	2.35%	0	22,990	21.19%	2	2,776	2.56%	0	2,281	2.10%	0	18,163	16.74%	1	13,285	12.24%	1
2013				817	0.76%	0	3,165	2.95%	0	44,050	41.01%	3	2,583	2.40%	0	13,162	12.25%	1	4,248	3.95%	0	3,418	3.18%	0	20,537	19.12%	1	13,683	12.74%	1
2009				612	0.59%	0	5,367	5.15%	0	47,728	45.77%	3	351	0.34%	0	12,912	12.38%	1	3,103	2.98%	0	3,182	3.05%	0	11,643	11.16%	1	18,272	17.52%	1
2005				587	0.55%	0	8,430	7.89%	0	47,202	44.20%	4	152	0.14%	0	13,583	12.72%	1	4,662	4.37%	0	4,285	4.01%	0	8,576	8.03%	0	18,208	17.05%	1
2001	69	0.07%	0	514	0.49%	0	11,613	11.16%	1	37,903	36.43%	3	191	0.18%	0	12,604	12.12%	1	3,445	3.31%	0	10,418	10.01%	0	13,245	12.73%	1	11,189	10.76%	1
1997	81	0.07%	0	786	0.71%	0	6,011	5.45%	0	50,957	46.17%	4	212	0.19%	0	15,456	14.00%	1	3,155	2.86%	0	12,026	10.90%	1	9,602	8.70%	0	11,200	10.15%	1
1993				305	0.28%	0	8,252	7.59%	0	51,163	47.09%	4	85	0.08%	0	26,009	23.94%	2	2,132	1.96%	0	5,173	4.76%	0	10,009	9.21%	1	4,221	3.88%	0
1989				363	0.31%	0	10,136	8.65%	0	57,017	48.64%	4	348	0.30%	0	15,087	12.87%	1	2,283	1.95%	0	6,222	5.31%	0	14,723	12.56%	1	11,047	9.42%	1
1985	156	0.13%	0	284	0.24%	0	3,938	3.33%	0	66,952	56.67%	5				14,429	12.21%	1	2,532	2.14%	0	6,165	5.22%	0	21,331	18.05%	1	2,064	1.75%	0
1981	270	0.24%	0	369	0.32%	0	4,214	3.71%	0	59,003	51.97%	4				18,043	15.89%	1				7,464	6.57%	0	20,963	18.46%	2	2,901	2.56%	0
1977	278	0.26%	0	287	0.27%	0	3,121	2.96%	0	59,049	56.03%	4				17,066	16.19%	1	2,008	1.91%	0	9,569	9.08%	1	12,524	11.88%	1	874	0.83%	0
1973				248	0.25%	0	8,262	8.22%	0	49,737	49.48%	4				22,319	22.20%	2				7,604	7.56%	0	8,650	8.60%	1	2,575	2.56%	0
1969	846	0.84%	0				2,383	2.36%	0	56,822	56.27%	5				22,493	22.28%	2	5,002	4.95%	0	4,848	4.80%	0	8,581	8.50%	0			
1965	1,078	1.14%	0				4,423	4.66%	0	50,755	53.53%	4				18,951	19.99%	2	4,992	5.26%	0	3,890	4.10%	0	10,735	11.32%	1			
1961	2,564	3.05%	0							47,379	56.42%	4				20,875	24.86%	2				5,584	6.65%	0	7,556	9.00%	1			
1957	2,557	3.00%	0							47,812	56.03%	4				16,428	19.25%	2	3,605	4.22%	0	6,410	7.51%	0	8,513	9.98%	1			
1953	3,751	4.40%	0							46,206	54.16%	5				17,594	20.62%	2	5,105	5.98%	0	5,597	6.56%	0	7,063	8.28%	0			
1949	4,012	5.26%	0							39,620	51.95%	4				19,764	25.91%	2	7,312	9.59%	0	5,410	7.09%	0						
1945	6,293	9.32%	0							32,054	47.49%	3				15,644	23.18%	2	11,793	17.47%	1				1,714	2.54%	0			
1936										30,849	48.70%	4				19,726	31.14%	2	856	1.35%	0				3,084	4.87%	0			
1933	386	0.70%	0							24,381	44.31%	3				18,619	33.84%	2	1,943	3.53%	0									
1930	322	0.57%	0							20,027	35.76%	2				22,152	39.55%	3	2,361	4.22%	0				2,775	4.95%	0			
1927	1,104	2.27%	0							15,043	30.92%	2				19,906	40.92%	3												
1924	4,216	9.15%	0							5,322	11.55%	1				18,403	39.94%	3	1,227	2.66%	0									
1921										7,315	16.69%	1				15,728	35.89%	3	1,089	2.49%	0				3,823	8.72%	0			

(Excludes compensatory seats. Figures in italics represent joint lists.)

=== Detailed ===
==== 2020s ====
===== 2025 =====
Results of the 2025 parliamentary election held on 8 September 2025:

Party		Votes	%	Seats		
Party		Votes	%	Con.	Com.	Tot.
Labour Party	Ap	34,045	33.22%	2	0	2
Progress Party	FrP	21,908	21.37%	2	0	2
Centre Party	Sp	16,172	15.78%	1	0	1
Conservative Party	H	9,445	9.21%	0	0	0
Socialist Left Party	SV	4,640	4.53%	0	1	1
Red Party	R	4,584	4.47%	0	0	0
Green Party	MDG	2,954	2.88%	0	0	0
Christian Democratic Party	KrF	2,270	2.21%	0	0	0
Liberal Party	V	2,215	2.16%	0	0	0
Pensioners' Party	PP	979	0.96%	0	0	0
Norway Democrats	ND	866	0.84%	0	0	0
Generation Party	GP	705	0.69%	0	0	0
Industry and Business Party	INP	658	0.64%	0	0	0
Conservative	K	316	0.31%	0	0	0
Peace and Justice	FOR	246	0.24%	0	0	0
Center Party	PS	189	0.18%	0	0	0
DNI Party	DNI	153	0.15%	0	0	0
Welfare and Innovation Party	VIP	153	0.15%	0	0	0
Valid votes		102,498	100.00%	5	1	6
Blank votes		1,092	1.05%			
Rejected votes – other		169	0.16%			
Total polled		103,759	77.84%			
Registered electors		133,306				

The following candidates were elected:

- Constituency seats - Bengt Fasteraune (Sp); Anne Hagenborg (Ap); Finn Krokeide (FrP); Lars Rem (FrP); and Rune Støstad (Ap).
- Compensatory seat - Anne Lise Fredlund (SV).

===== 2021 =====
Results of the 2021 parliamentary election held on 13 September 2021:

Party		Votes	%	Seats		
Party		Votes	%	Con.	Com.	Tot.
Labour Party	Ap	34,552	35.02%	2	0	2
Centre Party	Sp	25,619	25.97%	2	0	2
Conservative Party	H	12,323	12.49%	1	0	1
Progress Party	FrP	8,459	8.57%	0	1	1
Socialist Left Party	SV	5,508	5.58%	0	0	0
Red Party	R	3,534	3.58%	0	0	0
Liberal Party	V	2,370	2.40%	0	0	0
Green Party	MDG	2,289	2.32%	0	0	0
Christian Democratic Party	KrF	1,537	1.56%	0	0	0
Democrats in Norway		930	0.94%	0	0	0
Pensioners' Party	PP	528	0.54%	0	0	0
The Christians	PDK	212	0.21%	0	0	0
Health Party		185	0.19%	0	0	0
Center Party		184	0.19%	0	0	0
Industry and Business Party	INP	128	0.13%	0	0	0
Capitalist Party		91	0.09%	0	0	0
Alliance - Alternative for Norway		81	0.08%	0	0	0
People's Action No to More Road Tolls	FNB	66	0.07%	0	0	0
Pirate Party of Norway		65	0.07%	0	0	0
Valid votes		98,661	100.00%	5	1	6
Blank votes		578	0.58%			
Rejected votes – other		113	0.11%			
Total polled		99,352	75.05%			
Registered electors		132,383				

The following candidates were elected:

- Constituency seats - Rigmor Aasrud (Ap); Bengt Fasteraune (Sp); Kari-Anne Jønnes (H); Rune Støstad (Ap); and Marit Knutsdatter Strand (Sp).
- Compensatory seat - Carl I. Hagen (FrP).

==== 2010s ====
===== 2017 =====
Results of the 2017 parliamentary election held on 11 September 2017:

Party		Votes	%	Seats		
Party		Votes	%	Con.	Com.	Tot.
Labour Party	Ap	38,056	35.07%	2	0	2
Centre Party	Sp	22,990	21.19%	2	0	2
Conservative Party	H	18,163	16.74%	1	0	1
Progress Party	FrP	13,285	12.24%	1	0	1
Socialist Left Party	SV	5,028	4.63%	0	0	0
Liberal Party	V	2,776	2.56%	0	1	1
Green Party	MDG	2,550	2.35%	0	0	0
Christian Democratic Party	KrF	2,281	2.10%	0	0	0
Red Party	R	1,823	1.68%	0	0	0
Health Party		455	0.42%	0	0	0
Pensioners' Party	PP	453	0.42%	0	0	0
The Christians	PDK	184	0.17%	0	0	0
Capitalist Party		146	0.13%	0	0	0
The Alliance		138	0.13%	0	0	0
Democrats in Norway		132	0.12%	0	0	0
Coastal Party	KP	40	0.04%	0	0	0
Valid votes		108,500	100.00%	6	1	7
Blank votes		697	0.64%			
Rejected votes – other		215	0.20%			
Total polled		109,412	76.39%			
Registered electors		143,221				

The following candidates were elected:

- Constituency seats - Rigmor Aasrud (Ap); Tore Hagebakken (Ap); Morten Ørsal Johansen (FrP); Ivar Odnes (Sp); Marit Knutsdatter Strand (Sp); and Olemic Thommessen (H).
- Compensatory seat - Ketil Kjenseth (V).

===== 2013 =====
Results of the 2013 parliamentary election held on 8 and 9 September 2013:

Party		Votes	%	Seats		
Party		Votes	%	Con.	Com.	Tot.
Labour Party	Ap	44,050	41.01%	3	0	3
Conservative Party	H	20,537	19.12%	1	0	1
Progress Party	FrP	13,683	12.74%	1	0	1
Centre Party	Sp	13,162	12.25%	1	0	1
Liberal Party	V	4,248	3.95%	0	1	1
Christian Democratic Party	KrF	3,418	3.18%	0	0	0
Socialist Left Party	SV	3,165	2.95%	0	0	0
Green Party	MDG	2,583	2.40%	0	0	0
Red Party	R	817	0.76%	0	0	0
Pensioners' Party	PP	802	0.75%	0	0	0
The Christians	PDK	460	0.43%	0	0	0
Pirate Party of Norway		298	0.28%	0	0	0
Coastal Party	KP	74	0.07%	0	0	0
Liberal People's Party	DLF	58	0.05%	0	0	0
Democrats in Norway		54	0.05%	0	0	0
Valid votes		107,409	100.00%	6	1	7
Blank votes		488	0.45%			
Rejected votes – other		108	0.10%			
Total polled		108,005	76.05%			
Registered electors		142,014				

The following candidates were elected:

- Constituency seats - Rigmor Aasrud (Ap); Tore Hagebakken (Ap); Stine Renate Håheim (Ap); Morten Ørsal Johansen (FrP); Olemic Thommessen (H); and Anne Tingelstad Wøien (Sp).
- Compensatory seat - Ketil Kjenseth (V).

==== 2000s ====
===== 2009 =====
Results of the 2009 parliamentary election held on 13 and 14 September 2009:

Party		Votes	%	Seats		
Party		Votes	%	Con.	Com.	Tot.
Labour Party	Ap	47,728	45.77%	3	0	3
Progress Party	FrP	18,272	17.52%	1	0	1
Centre Party	Sp	12,912	12.38%	1	0	1
Conservative Party	H	11,643	11.16%	1	0	1
Socialist Left Party	SV	5,367	5.15%	0	1	1
Christian Democratic Party	KrF	3,182	3.05%	0	0	0
Liberal Party	V	3,103	2.98%	0	0	0
Pensioners' Party	PP	837	0.80%	0	0	0
Red Party	R	612	0.59%	0	0	0
Green Party	MDG	351	0.34%	0	0	0
Christian Unity Party	KSP	173	0.17%	0	0	0
Coastal Party	KP	57	0.05%	0	0	0
Democrats in Norway		49	0.05%	0	0	0
Valid votes		104,286	100.00%	6	1	7
Blank votes		455	0.43%			
Rejected votes – other		108	0.10%			
Total polled		104,849	74.23%			
Registered electors		141,243				

The following candidates were elected:

- Constituency seats - Rigmor Aasrud (Ap); Tore Hagebakken (Ap); Morten Ørsal Johansen (FrP); Torstein Rudihagen (Ap); Olemic Thommessen (H); and Anne Tingelstad Wøien (Sp).
- Compensatory seat - Aksel Hagen (SV).

===== 2005 =====
Results of the 2005 parliamentary election held on 11 and 12 September 2005:

Party		Votes	%	Seats		
Party		Votes	%	Con.	Com.	Tot.
Labour Party	Ap	47,202	44.20%	4	0	4
Progress Party	FrP	18,208	17.05%	1	0	1
Centre Party	Sp	13,583	12.72%	1	0	1
Conservative Party	H	8,576	8.03%	0	1	1
Socialist Left Party	SV	8,430	7.89%	0	0	0
Liberal Party	V	4,662	4.37%	0	0	0
Christian Democratic Party	KrF	4,285	4.01%	0	0	0
Red Electoral Alliance	RV	587	0.55%	0	0	0
Pensioners' Party	PP	576	0.54%	0	0	0
Coastal Party	KP	269	0.25%	0	0	0
Green Party	MDG	152	0.14%	0	0	0
Christian Unity Party	KSP	126	0.12%	0	0	0
Reform Party		89	0.08%	0	0	0
Democrats		49	0.05%	0	0	0
Valid votes		106,794	100.00%	6	1	7
Blank votes		288	0.27%			
Rejected votes – other		63	0.06%			
Total polled		107,145	76.27%			
Registered electors		140,480				

The following candidates were elected:

- Constituency seats - Berit Brørby (Ap); Inger S. Enger (Sp); Tore Hagebakken (Ap); Espen Johnsen (Ap); Thore A. Nistad (FrP); and Torstein Rudihagen (Ap).
- Compensatory seat - Olemic Thommessen (H).

===== 2001 =====
Results of the 2001 parliamentary election held on 9 and 10 September 2001:

Party		Votes	%	Seats		
Party		Votes	%	Con.	Com.	Tot.
Labour Party	Ap	37,903	36.43%	3	0	3
Conservative Party	H	13,245	12.73%	1	0	1
Centre Party	Sp	12,604	12.12%	1	0	1
Socialist Left Party	SV	11,613	11.16%	1	0	1
Progress Party	FrP	11,189	10.76%	1	0	1
Christian Democratic Party	KrF	10,418	10.01%	0	0	0
Liberal Party	V	3,445	3.31%	0	0	0
Pensioners' Party	PP	1,023	0.98%	0	0	0
The Political Party	DPP	864	0.83%	0	0	0
Red Electoral Alliance	RV	514	0.49%	0	0	0
Non-Partisan Coastal and Rural District Party		396	0.38%	0	0	0
Christian Unity Party	KSP	211	0.20%	0	0	0
Green Party	MDG	191	0.18%	0	0	0
County Lists		170	0.16%	0	0	0
Fatherland Party	FLP	96	0.09%	0	0	0
Norwegian People's Party	NFP	84	0.08%	0	0	0
Communist Party of Norway	K	69	0.07%	0	0	0
Valid votes		104,035	100.00%	7	0	7
Rejected votes		683	0.65%			
Total polled		104,718	73.92%			
Registered electors		141,658				

The following candidates were elected:

- Constituency seats - Kjetil Bjørklund (SV); Haakon Blankenborg (Ap); Berit Brørby (Ap); Inger S. Enger (Sp); Thore A. Nistad (FrP); Torstein Rudihagen (Ap); and Olemic Thommessen (H).

==== 1990s ====
===== 1997 =====
Results of the 1997 parliamentary election held on 15 September 1997:

Party		Votes	%	Seats		
Party		Votes	%	Con.	Com.	Tot.
Labour Party	Ap	50,957	46.17%	4	0	4
Centre Party	Sp	15,456	14.00%	1	0	1
Christian Democratic Party	KrF	12,026	10.90%	1	0	1
Progress Party	FrP	11,200	10.15%	1	0	1
Conservative Party	H	9,602	8.70%	0	0	0
Socialist Left Party	SV	6,011	5.45%	0	0	0
Liberal Party	V	3,155	2.86%	0	0	0
Red Electoral Alliance	RV	786	0.71%	0	0	0
Pensioners' Party	PP	539	0.49%	0	0	0
Green Party	MDG	212	0.19%	0	0	0
Fatherland Party	FLP	201	0.18%	0	0	0
Natural Law Party		101	0.09%	0	0	0
Communist Party of Norway	K	81	0.07%	0	0	0
Non-Partisan Deputies	TVF	37	0.03%	0	0	0
Valid votes		110,364	100.00%	7	0	7
Rejected votes		332	0.30%			
Total polled		110,696	77.75%			
Registered electors		142,381				

The following candidates were elected:

- Constituency seats - Haakon Blankenborg (Ap); Berit Brørby (Ap); Reidun Gravdahl (Ap); Rigmor Kofoed-Larsen (KrF); Thore A. Nistad (FrP); Torstein Rudihagen (Ap); and Marit Tingelstad (Sp).

===== 1993 =====
Results of the 1993 parliamentary election held on 12 and 13 September 1993:

Party		Votes	%	Seats		
Party		Votes	%	Con.	Com.	Tot.
Labour Party	Ap	51,163	47.09%	4	0	4
Centre Party	Sp	26,009	23.94%	2	0	2
Conservative Party	H	10,009	9.21%	1	0	1
Socialist Left Party	SV	8,252	7.59%	0	0	0
Christian Democratic Party	KrF	5,173	4.76%	0	0	0
Progress Party	FrP	4,221	3.88%	0	0	0
Liberal Party	V	2,132	1.96%	0	0	0
Pensioners' Party	PP	549	0.51%	0	0	0
Fatherland Party	FLP	355	0.33%	0	0	0
Red Electoral Alliance	RV	305	0.28%	0	0	0
New Future Coalition Party	SNF	206	0.19%	0	0	0
Freedom Party against the EU		89	0.08%	0	0	0
Green Party	MDG	85	0.08%	0	0	0
Natural Law Party		80	0.07%	0	0	0
Liberal People's Party	DLF	28	0.03%	0	0	0
Valid votes		108,656	100.00%	7	0	7
Rejected votes		500	0.46%			
Total polled		109,156	76.15%			
Registered electors		143,342				

The following candidates were elected:

- Constituency seats - Syver Berge (Sp); Haakon Blankenborg (Ap); Marie Brenden (Ap); Berit Brørby (Ap); Johan M. Nyland (Ap); Marit Tingelstad (Sp); and Dag C. Weberg (H).

==== 1980s ====
===== 1989 =====
Results of the 1989 parliamentary election held on 10 and 11 September 1989:

Party		Votes	%	Seats		
Party		Votes	%	Con.	Com.	Tot.
Labour Party	Ap	57,017	48.64%	4	0	4
Centre Party	Sp	15,087	12.87%	1	0	1
Conservative Party	H	14,723	12.56%	1	0	1
Progress Party	FrP	11,047	9.42%	1	0	1
Socialist Left Party	SV	10,136	8.65%	0	0	0
Christian Democratic Party	KrF	6,222	5.31%	0	0	0
Liberal Party	V	2,283	1.95%	0	0	0
County Lists for Environment and Solidarity	FMS	363	0.31%	0	0	0
Green Party	MDG	348	0.30%	0	0	0
Valid votes		117,226	100.00%	7	0	7
Rejected votes		218	0.19%			
Total polled		117,444	82.92%			
Registered electors		141,643				

The following candidates were elected:

- Constituency seats - Syver Berge (Sp); Haakon Blankenborg (Ap); Marie Brenden (Ap); Berit Brørby (Ap); Johan M. Nyland (Ap); Peder I. Ramsrud (FrP); and Dag C. Weberg (H).

===== 1985 =====
Results of the 1985 parliamentary election held on 8 and 9 September 1985:

Party		Party			List Alliance		
Party		Votes	%	Seats	Votes	%	Seats
Labour Party	Ap	66,952	56.67%	5	66,952	57.17%	5
Conservative Party	H	21,331	18.05%	1	21,331	18.22%	1
Centre Party	Sp	14,429	12.21%	1	19,550	16.69%	1
Christian Democratic Party	KrF	6,165	5.22%	0	19,550	16.69%	1
Socialist Left Party	SV	3,938	3.33%	0	3,938	3.36%	0
Liberal Party	V	2,532	2.14%	0	2,532	2.16%	0
Progress Party	FrP	2,064	1.75%	0	2,064	1.76%	0
Red Electoral Alliance	RV	284	0.24%	0	284	0.24%	0
Liberal People's Party	DLF	197	0.17%	0	197	0.17%	0
Communist Party of Norway	K	156	0.13%	0	156	0.13%	0
Citizen Party		100	0.08%	0	100	0.09%	0
Valid votes		118,148	100.00%	7	117,104	100.00%	7
Rejected votes		182	0.15%				
Total polled		118,330	85.13%				
Registered electors		138,995					

As the list alliance was not entitled to more seats contesting as an alliance than it was contesting as individual parties, the distribution of seats was as party votes.

The following candidates were elected: Haakon Blankenborg (Ap); Marie Brenden (Ap); Berit Brørby (Ap); Åge Hovengen (Ap); Harald U. Lied (H); Johan M. Nyland (Ap); and Lars Velsand (Sp).

===== 1981 =====
Results of the 1981 parliamentary election held on 13 and 14 September 1981:

Party		Votes	%	Seats
Labour Party	Ap	59,003	51.97%	4
Conservative Party	H	20,963	18.46%	2
Centre Party–Liberal Party	Sp-V	18,043	15.89%	1
Christian Democratic Party	KrF	7,464	6.57%	0
Socialist Left Party	SV	4,214	3.71%	0
Progress Party	FrP	2,901	2.56%	0
Red Electoral Alliance	RV	369	0.32%	0
Communist Party of Norway	K	270	0.24%	0
Liberal People's Party	DLF	229	0.20%	0
Plebiscite Party		42	0.04%	0
Free Elected Representatives		41	0.04%	0
Valid votes		113,539	100.00%	7
Rejected votes		178	0.16%	
Total polled		113,717	84.08%	
Registered electors		135,251		

The following candidates were elected: Liv Andersen (Ap); Haakon Blankenborg (Ap); Åge Hovengen (Ap); Harald U. Lied (H); Kristian Lund (H); Kristine Rusten (Ap); and Lars Velsand (Sp-V).

==== 1970s ====
===== 1977 =====
Results of the 1977 parliamentary election held on 11 and 12 September 1977:

Party		Votes	%	Seats
Labour Party	Ap	59,049	56.03%	4
Centre Party	Sp	17,066	16.19%	1
Conservative Party	H	12,524	11.88%	1
Christian Democratic Party	KrF	9,569	9.08%	1
Socialist Left Party	SV	3,121	2.96%	0
Liberal Party	V	2,008	1.91%	0
Progress Party	FrP	874	0.83%	0
New People's Party	DNF	437	0.41%	0
Red Electoral Alliance	RV	287	0.27%	0
Communist Party of Norway	K	278	0.26%	0
Single Person's Party		99	0.09%	0
Norwegian Democratic Party		36	0.03%	0
Free Elected Representatives		34	0.03%	0
Valid votes		105,382	100.00%	7
Rejected votes		131	0.12%	
Total polled		105,513	83.92%	
Registered electors		125,734		

The following candidates were elected: Liv Andersen (Ap); Olav Djupvik (KrF); Rolf Furuseth (Ap); Åge Hovengen (Ap); Harald U. Lied (H); Ola O. Røssum (Sp); and Kristine Rusten (Ap).

===== 1973 =====
Results of the 1973 parliamentary election held on 9 and 10 September 1973:

Party		Votes	%	Seats
Labour Party	Ap	49,737	49.48%	4
Centre Party–Liberal Party	Sp-V	22,319	22.20%	2
Conservative Party	H	8,650	8.60%	1
Socialist Electoral League	SV	8,262	8.22%	0
Christian Democratic Party	KrF	7,604	7.56%	0
Anders Lange's Party	ALP	2,575	2.56%	0
New People's Party	DNF	823	0.82%	0
Red Electoral Alliance	RV	248	0.25%	0
Women's Free Elected Representatives		128	0.13%	0
Single Person's Party		117	0.12%	0
Norwegian Democratic Party		66	0.07%	0
Valid votes		100,529	100.00%	7
Rejected votes		136	0.14%	
Total polled		100,665	82.61%	
Registered electors		121,854		

The following candidates were elected: Liv Andersen (Ap); Bodil Finsveen (Sp-V); Rolf Furuseth (Ap); Harald U. Lied (H); Per Mellesmo (Ap); Ola O. Røssum (Sp-V); and Thorstein Treholt (Ap).

==== 1960s ====
===== 1969 =====
Results of the 1969 parliamentary election held on 7 and 8 September 1969:

Party		Votes	%	Seats
Labour Party	Ap	56,822	56.27%	5
Centre Party	Sp	22,493	22.28%	2
Conservative Party	H	8,581	8.50%	0
Liberal Party	V	5,002	4.95%	0
Christian Democratic Party	KrF	4,848	4.80%	0
Socialist People's Party	SF	2,383	2.36%	0
Communist Party of Norway	K	846	0.84%	0
Valid votes		100,975	100.00%	7
Rejected votes		169	0.17%	
Total polled		101,144	86.39%	
Registered electors		117,081		

The following candidates were elected: Liv Andersen (Ap); Rolf Furuseth (Ap); Asbjørn Granheim (Sp); Torger Hovi (Ap); Per Mellesmo (Ap); Ola O. Røssum (Sp); and Thorstein Treholt (Ap).

===== 1965 =====
Results of the 1965 parliamentary election held on 12 and 13 September 1965:

Party		Votes	%	Seats
Labour Party	Ap	50,755	53.53%	4
Centre Party	Sp	18,951	19.99%	2
Conservative Party	H	10,735	11.32%	1
Liberal Party–Radical People's Party	V-RF	4,992	5.26%	0
Socialist People's Party	SF	4,423	4.66%	0
Christian Democratic Party	KrF	3,890	4.10%	0
Communist Party of Norway	K	1,078	1.14%	0
Valid votes		94,824	100.00%	7
Rejected votes		392	0.41%	
Total polled		95,216	86.45%	
Registered electors		110,144		

The following candidates were elected: Einar Hovdhaugen (Sp); Torger Hovi (Ap); Per Mellesmo (Ap); Trygve Owren (H); Oskar Skogly (Ap); Thorstein Treholt (Ap); and Trond Halvorsen Wirstad (Sp).

===== 1961 =====
Results of the 1961 parliamentary election held on 11 September 1961:

Party		Votes	%	Seats
Labour Party	Ap	47,379	56.42%	4
Centre Party–Liberal Party–Radical People's Party	Sp-V-RF	20,875	24.86%	2
Conservative Party	H	7,556	9.00%	1
Christian Democratic Party	KrF	5,584	6.65%	0
Communist Party of Norway	K	2,564	3.05%	0
Wild Votes		11	0.01%	0
Valid votes		83,969	100.00%	7
Rejected votes		523	0.62%	
Total polled		84,492	77.74%	
Registered electors		108,680		

The following candidates were elected: Guttorm Granum (H), 7,558 votes; Einar Hovdhaugen (Sp-V-RF), 20,856 votes; Torger Hovi (Ap), 47,378 votes; Gunnar Kalrasten (Ap), 47,372 votes; Oskar Skogly (Ap), 47,354 votes; Thorstein Treholt (Ap), 47,367 votes; and Trond Halvorsen Wirstad (Sp-V-RF), 20,866 votes.

==== 1950s ====
===== 1957 =====
Results of the 1957 parliamentary election held on 7 October 1957:

Party		Votes	%	Seats
Labour Party	Ap	47,812	56.03%	4
Farmers' Party	Bp	16,428	19.25%	2
Conservative Party	H	8,513	9.98%	1
Christian Democratic Party	KrF	6,410	7.51%	0
Liberal Party	V	3,605	4.22%	0
Communist Party of Norway	K	2,557	3.00%	0
Wild Votes		1	0.00%	0
Valid votes		85,326	100.00%	7
Rejected votes		406	0.47%	
Total polled		85,732	78.93%	
Registered electors		108,621		

The following candidates were elected: Guttorm Granum (H); Einar Hovdhaugen (Bp); Gunnar Kalrasten (Ap); Olav Meisdalshagen (Ap); Oskar Skogly (Ap); Thorstein Treholt (Ap); and Trond Halvorsen Wirstad (Bp).

===== 1953 =====
Results of the 1953 parliamentary election held on 12 October 1953:

Party		Votes	%	Seats
Labour Party	Ap	46,206	54.16%	5
Farmers' Party	Bp	17,594	20.62%	2
Conservative Party	H	7,063	8.28%	0
Christian Democratic Party	KrF	5,597	6.56%	0
Liberal Party	V	5,105	5.98%	0
Communist Party of Norway	K	3,751	4.40%	0
Valid votes		85,316	100.00%	7
Rejected votes		408	0.48%	
Total polled		85,724	79.27%	
Registered electors		108,141		

The following candidates were elected: Anders Hove (Ap); Gunnar Kalrasten (Ap); Olav Meisdalshagen (Ap); Lars Magnus Moen (Ap); Anton Ryen (Bp); Martin Smeby (Ap); and Trond Halvorsen Wirstad (Bp).

==== 1940s ====
===== 1949 =====
Results of the 1949 parliamentary election held on 10 October 1949:

Party		Votes	%	Seats
Labour Party	Ap	39,620	51.95%	4
Farmers' Party	Bp	19,764	25.91%	2
Liberal Party–Radical People's Party	V-RF	7,312	9.59%	0
Christian Democratic Party	KrF	5,410	7.09%	0
Communist Party of Norway	K	4,012	5.26%	0
Society Party	Samfp	138	0.18%	0
Wild Votes		9	0.01%	0
Valid votes		76,265	100.00%	6
Rejected votes		574	0.75%	
Total polled		76,839	82.12%	
Registered electors		93,568		

The following candidates were elected: Gunnar Kalrasten (Ap); Olav Meisdalshagen (Ap); Lars Magnus Moen (Ap); Anton Ryen (Bp); Martin Smeby (Ap); and Trond Halvorsen Wirstad (Bp).

===== 1945 =====
Results of the 1945 parliamentary election held on 8 October 1945:

Party		Party			List Alliance		
Party		Votes	%	Seats	Votes	%	Seats
Labour Party	Ap	32,054	47.49%	4	32,054	47.49%	3
Farmers' Party	Bp	15,644	23.18%	1	17,358	25.72%	2
Opland Civic Voters Association (Conservative Party)	BV	1,714	2.54%	0	17,358	25.72%	2
Liberal Party–Radical People's Party	V-RF	11,793	17.47%	1	11,793	17.47%	1
Communist Party of Norway	K	6,293	9.32%	0	6,293	9.32%	0
Wild Votes		2	0.00%	0	2	0.00%	0
Valid votes		67,500	100.00%	6	67,500	100.00%	6
Rejected votes		500	0.74%				
Total polled		68,000	79.83%				
Registered electors		85,186					

As the list alliance was entitled to more seats contesting as an alliance than it was contesting as individual parties, the distribution of seats was as list alliance votes. The Bp-BV list alliance's additional seat was allocated to the Farmers' Party.

The following candidates were elected: Ola Torstensen Lyngstad (V-RF); Olav Meisdalshagen (Ap); Lars Magnus Moen (Ap); Arne Rostad (Bp); Anton Ryen (Bp); and Martin Smeby (Ap).

==== 1930s ====
===== 1936 =====
Results of the 1936 parliamentary election held on 19 October 1936:

Party		Party			List Alliance		
Party		Votes	%	Seats	Votes	%	Seats
Labour Party	Ap	30,849	48.70%	4	30,849	48.71%	4
Farmers' Party	Bp	19,726	31.14%	2	22,808	36.01%	2
Opland Civic Voters Association (Conservative Party)	BV	3,084	4.87%	0	22,808	36.01%	2
Radical People's Party	RF	6,407	10.12%	0	7,261	11.46%	0
Liberal Party	V	856	1.35%	0	7,261	11.46%	0
Nasjonal Samling	NS	1,737	2.74%	0	1,737	2.74%	0
Society Party	Samfp	674	1.06%	0	674	1.06%	0
Wild Votes		8	0.01%	0	8	0.01%	0
Valid votes		63,341	100.00%	6	63,337	100.00%	6
Rejected votes		281	0.44%				
Total polled		63,622	84.63%				
Registered electors		75,174					

As the list alliances were not entitled to more seats contesting as alliances than they were contesting as individual parties, the distribution of seats was as party votes.

The following candidates were elected: Erling Bjørnson (Bp); Johannes A. Bøe (Ap); Einar Borch (Bp); Olav Meisdalshagen (Ap); Lars Magnus Moen (Ap); and Martin Smeby (Ap).

===== 1933 =====
Results of the 1933 parliamentary election held on 16 October 1933:

Party		Party			List Alliance		
Party		Votes	%	Seats	Votes	%	Seats
Labour Party	Ap	24,381	44.31%	3	24,381	44.31%	3
Farmers' Party	Bp	18,619	33.84%	2	18,619	33.84%	2
Radical People's Party	RF	6,858	12.46%	1	8,796	15.99%	1
Liberal Party	V	1,943	3.53%	0	8,796	15.99%	1
Nasjonal Samling–Villagers	NS-B	2,841	5.16%	0	2,841	5.16%	0
Communist Party of Norway	K	386	0.70%	0	386	0.70%	0
Valid votes		55,028	100.00%	6	55,023	100.00%	6
Rejected votes		182	0.33%				
Total polled		55,210	76.77%				
Registered electors		71,913					

As the list alliance was not entitled to more seats contesting as an alliance than it was contesting as individual parties, the distribution of seats was as party votes.

The following candidates were elected: Erling Bjørnson (Bp); Johannes A. Bøe (Ap); Alf Mjøen (RF); Lars Magnus Moen (Ap); Kristian Ørud (Bp); and Martin Smeby (Ap).

===== 1930 =====
Results of the 1930 parliamentary election held on 20 October 1930:

Party		Party			List Alliance		
Party		Votes	%	Seats	Votes	%	Seats
Farmers' Party	Bp	22,152	39.55%	3	22,152	39.56%	3
Labour Party	Ap	20,027	35.76%	2	20,027	35.76%	2
Radical People's Party	RF	8,369	14.94%	1	10,726	19.15%	1
Liberal Party	V	2,361	4.22%	0	10,726	19.15%	1
Conservative Party–Free-minded Liberal Party	H-FV	2,775	4.95%	0	2,775	4.96%	0
Communist Party of Norway	K	322	0.57%	0	322	0.57%	0
Valid votes		56,006	100.00%	6	56,002	100.00%	6
Rejected votes		237	0.42%				
Total polled		56,243	81.37%				
Registered electors		69,116					

As the list alliance was not entitled to more seats contesting as an alliance than it was contesting as individual parties, the distribution of seats was as party votes.

The following candidates were elected: Johannes A. Bøe (Ap); Alf Mjøen (RF); Lars Magnus Moen (Ap); Kristian Ørud (Bp); Hans Olsen Skurdal (Bp); and Erik Andreas Knutsen Strand (Bp).

==== 1920s ====
===== 1927 =====
Results of the 1927 parliamentary election held on 17 October 1927:

Party		Votes	%	Seats
Farmers' Party	Bp	19,906	40.92%	3
Labour Party	Ap	15,043	30.92%	2
Radical People's Party	RF	12,592	25.88%	1
Communist Party of Norway	K	1,104	2.27%	0
Wild Votes		1	0.00%	0
Valid votes		48,646	100.00%	6
Rejected votes		566	1.15%	
Total polled		49,212	72.77%	
Registered electors		67,628		

The following candidates were elected: Johannes A. Bøe (Ap); Erik Enge (Bp); Alf Mjøen (RF); Lars Magnus Moen (Ap); Kristian Ørud (Bp); and Helge Nilsen Thune (Bp).

===== 1924 =====
Results of the 1924 parliamentary election held on 21 October 1924:

Party		Votes	%	Seats
Farmers' Party	Bp	18,403	39.94%	3
Radical People's Party	RF	13,686	29.70%	2
Labour Party	Ap	5,322	11.55%	1
Communist Party of Norway	K	4,216	9.15%	0
Free-minded Liberal Party	FV	3,212	6.97%	0
Liberal Party	V	1,227	2.66%	0
Wild Votes		16	0.03%	0
Valid votes		46,082	100.00%	6
Rejected votes		480	1.03%	
Total polled		46,562	71.85%	
Registered electors		64,804		

The following candidates were elected: Johannes A. Bøe (Ap); Einar Borch (Bp); Johan Castberg (RF); Peder Aslak Berntsen Owren (RF); Hans Olsen Skurdal (Bp); and Helge Nilsen Thune (Bp).

===== 1921 =====
Results of the 1921 parliamentary election held on 24 October 1921:

Party		Votes	%	Seats
Norwegian Farmers' Association	L	15,728	35.89%	3
Radical People's Party	RF	14,686	33.52%	2
Labour Party	Ap	7,315	16.69%	1
Conservative Party–Free-minded Liberal Party	H-FV	3,823	8.72%	0
Liberal Party	V	1,089	2.49%	0
Social Democratic Labour Party of Norway	S	1,054	2.41%	0
Wild Votes		122	0.28%	0
Valid votes		43,817	100.00%	6
Rejected votes		524	1.18%	
Total polled		44,341	70.96%	
Registered electors		62,486		

The following candidates were elected: Einar Borch (L); Ole Martin Lappen (RF); Alf Mjøen (RF); Lars Pedersen (Ap); Hans Olsen Skurdal (L); and Helge Nilsen Thune (L).
