= Torgeir Garmo =

Norwegian politician

Torgeir T. Garmo (born 13 March 1941) is a Norwegian hotelier, rock collector, non-fiction writer and politician for the Centre and Liberal parties.

Garmo was a member of the municipal council of Lom Municipality for the Centre Party. In 1979, he quit his membership together with mayor Kristen Brandsar. Ahead of the 1981 Norwegian parliamentary election, the Centre and Liberal parties decided to contest the election through a common list. While each party fielded their independent ballots, one candidate could become a deputy for another party's candidate. The Centre Party's top candidate Lars Velsand warned that the now-Liberal Garmo could be his deputy, instead of the Centre Party's preferred deputies Syver Berge and Maj-Britt Svastuen. This became the actual result. Garmo served as a deputy representative to the Parliament of Norway from Oppland during the term 1981–1985. He met during 28 days of parliamentary session.

He finished his secondary education in 1959, and graduated from the Norwegian Vocational Hotel School in Stavanger in 1964. He took over Fossheim Hotel in Lom, but became an outspoken critic of the local tourism. He instead specialized on a rock collection he had started during the 1960s. In 1985 Dagbladet speculated whether Garmo owned the world's largest rock and mineral collection, which encompassed all known minerals of Norway as well as large quantities of minerals from abroad. The same year, he resigned as hotelier and opened Fossheim Mineral Museum together with his wife, selling rocks and crafting jewelry.

Garmo's textbook Norsk steinbok came in 1983, and was reissued in 1989 by the University Press. Out of print for many years, it was updated into Norsk mineralbok in 2017. He also contributed to the book Jotunheimen, about Jotunheimen National Park, in a series on Norway's national parks. In 1990 he issued a travel guide book Lomsførar for natur og kultur on a new publishing house owned by himself, Steinvarp.
