= Aksel Hagen =

Norwegian politician

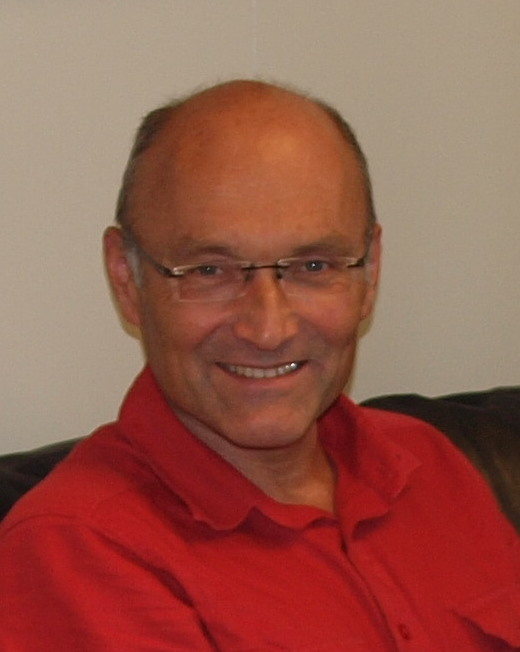

Member of Parliament for Oppland
- Incumbent
- Assumed office 14 September 2009

Personal details
- Born: 4 October 1953 (age 72) Stange
- Party: Socialist Left Party
- Domestic partner: Turid Thomassen
- Occupation: Politician

Aksel Hagen is a Norwegian politician and member of the Storting, representing the Socialist Left Party (SV) in the county of Oppland. He was elected to parliament following the 2009 parliamentary election by winning Oppland's leveling seat. He sits on the Standing Committee on Education, Research and Church Affairs.

Hagen has a doctoral degree from the Norwegian University of Life Sciences. He was a member of the municipal council for Lillehammer Municipality between 1991 and 2003, deputy county mayor of Oppland from 2003 to 2007, and a member of the Oppland county council from 2007 until his election to parliament. Hagen was deputy leader of SV's local Oppland chapter between 1998 and 2000, before become the chapter's leader between 2000 and 2004.

Hagen is cohabitant with Turid Thomassen, a politician of the Red Party.

During his successful campaign, Hagen identified narrowing the gap between rich and poor as his most important issue. In parliament, Hagen is SV's spokesperson on educational affairs, and supports longer school hours and the abolition of homework at the elementary school level (1st-7th grade).
