= Morten Ørsal Johansen =

Norwegian politician (born 1964)

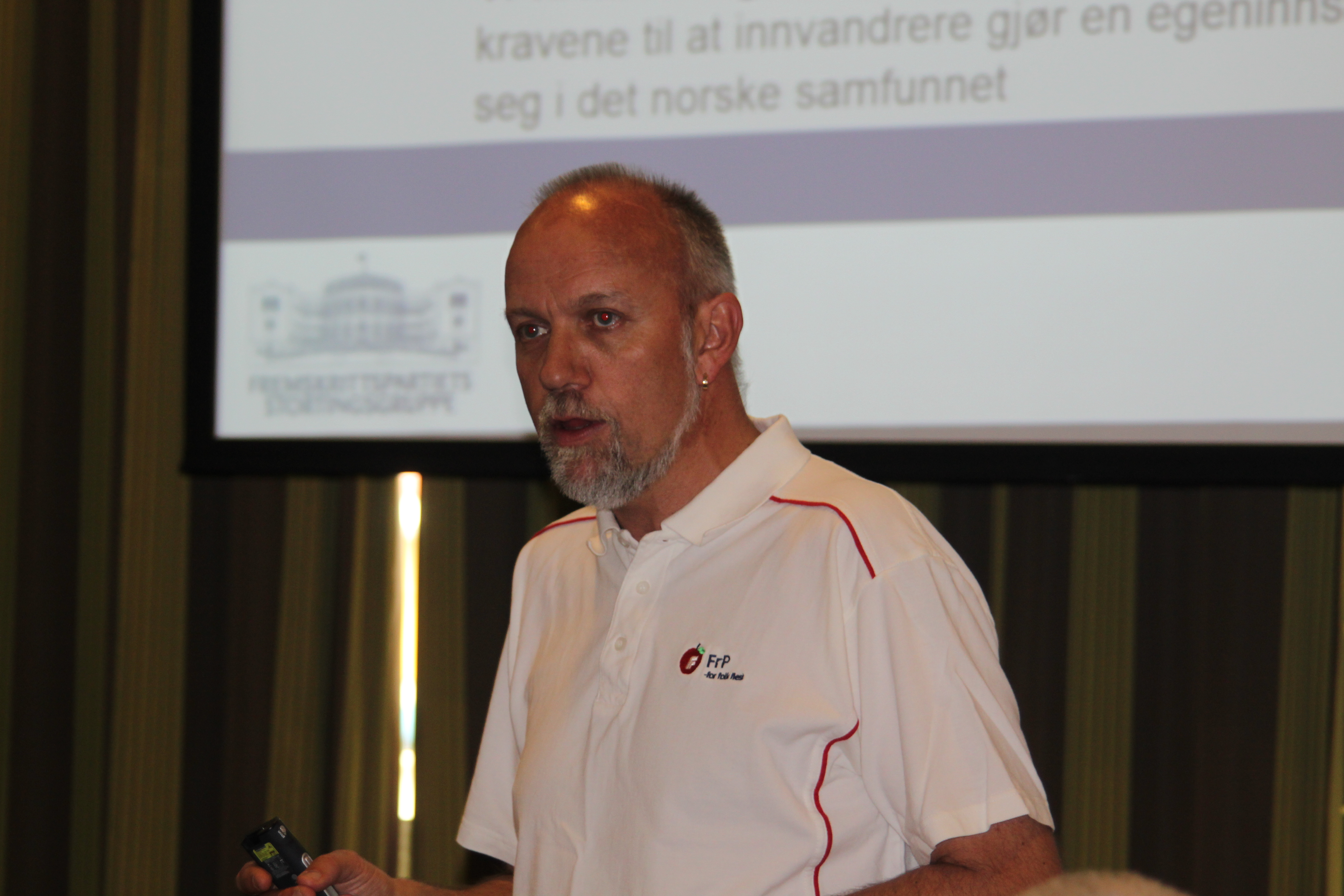
- Morten Ørsal Johansen ValgCamp2013

Member of the Parliament of Norway Assembly for Oppland
- Incumbent
- Assumed office 2009

Personal details
- Born: 11 September 1964 (age 61) Sunndal Municipality, Norway
- Party: Progress Party
- Occupation: Factory worker
- Committees: Standing Committee on Justice

Morten Ørsal Johansen (born 11 September 1964) is a Norwegian politician for the Progress Party.

== Early life and career ==
Johansen was born in Sunndal Municipality. His father was a photographer and his mother a pay secretary. He attended school in Raufoss, in his future parliamentary constituency of Oppland. He graduated from secondary school there in 1983 with diplomas in arts and sciences. He worked for Raufoss Ammunition as a factory worker from 1984 to 1994 before being promoted to supervisor in the latter year. He continued to work in this capacity until 2000. In 2002, he received a Master of Arts degree from Gjøvik University College.

== Political career ==
He had been a member of the municipal council of Vestre Toten Municipality since 1993 and of the executive committee from 1995 to 2011. He was a county councillor in Oppland from 1999 to 2009. From 1999, he was the head of Progress Party in Oppland.

He was elected to the Parliament of Norway in the 2009 Norwegian parliamentary election for Oppland and serves on the Standing Committee on Justice.
