= Oskar Skogly =

Norwegian politician

Minister of Local Government
- In office 4 February 1963 – 28 August 1963
- Prime Minister: Einar Gerhardsen
- Preceded by: Andreas Cappelen
- Succeeded by: Bjarne Lyngstad

Member of the Norwegian Parliament
- In office 1 January 1958 – 30 September 1969
- Constituency: Oppland

Personal details
- Born: 4 February 1908 Fåberg, Oppland, Norway
- Died: 16 February 1988 (aged 80)
- Party: Labour
- Spouse: Bertha Vaslien (m. 1932)
- Parent(s): Ole Haavemoen (father); Anna Mathisen (mother)

Oskar Skogly (4 February 1908 – 16 February 1988) was a Norwegian trade unionist and politician for the Labour Party. He is known as Minister of Local Government, mayor of Fåberg Municipality and three-term member of the Parliament of Norway.

== Career ==
He was born in Fåberg Municipality as a son of mason and smallholder Ole Håvemoen (1873–1956) and housewife Anna Mathisen (1870–1962). He took education as a painter, but made a career as a trade unionist in the Norwegian Union of Building Industry Workers, where he was a national board member from 1933 to 1940 and 1945 to 1974. He became a board member of the local Workers' Youth League chapter already in 1923, and remained so until 1932, chairing the chapter from 1924 to 1925 and 1928 to 1930. He served as deputy mayor of Fåberg from 1937 to 1945, except for the years 1941 to 1945 during the occupation of Norway by Nazi Germany. He then became mayor from 1945 to 1957. He was also a member of the school board from 1946 to 1957, as well as many other public committees.

He was elected to the Parliament of Norway from Oppland in 1958, and was re-elected on two occasions, the last term ending in 1969. From February to August 1963 he was the Norwegian Minister of Local Government in Gerhardsen's Third Cabinet. During this time his seat in parliament was taken by Per Mellesmo. From 1965 to 1969 Skogly served as the Vice President of the Odelsting. He was also a member of the municipal council for Lillehammer Municipality from 1963 to 1971 and 1975 to 1979.

Skogly served as a deputy board member of Opplandskraft from 1953 to 1961, board member of the Norwegian Federation of Co-operative Housing Associations, corporate council member in Norsk Jernverk from 1970 to 1978, and board chairman of Hunderfossen interkommunale kraftselskap from 1946 to 1976, Dagningen from 1955 to 1956 and the Norwegian State Housing Bank from 1966 to 1978.

Political offices
Preceded by Andreas Zeier Cappelen	Norwegian Minister of Local Government; February 1963–August 1963	Succeeded by Bjarne Lyngstad
