= Ivar Odnes =

Norwegian politician (1963–2018)

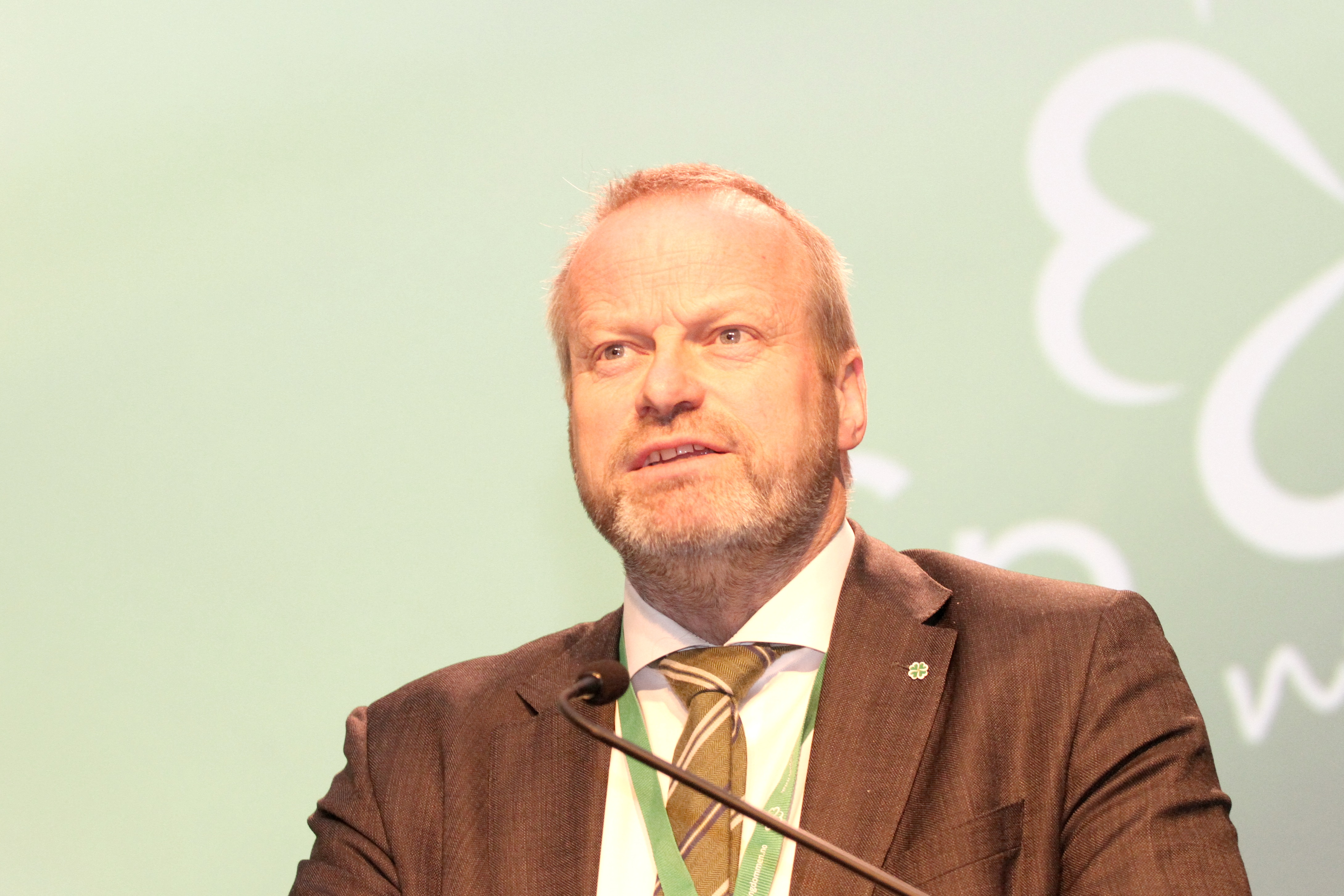
- Odnes in 2017

Member of the Storting
- In office 1 September 2017 – 5 October 2018
- Succeeded by: Bengt Fasteraune
- Constituency: Oppland

Deputy Member of the Storting
- In office 1 October 2013 – 30 September 2017
- Constituency: Oppland

Deputy county mayor of Oppland
- In office 2011–2017
- Mayor: Gro Lundby (2011-2015); Even Aleksander Hagen (2015-2019)
- Preceded by: Reidun Gravdahl (Ap)
- Succeeded by: Aud Hove (Sp)

Personal details
- Born: May 25, 1963
- Died: October 5, 2018 (aged 55)
- Political party: Centre

Ivar Odnes (25 May 1963 – 5 October 2018) was a Norwegian politician for the Centre Party.

He served as a deputy representative to the Parliament of Norway from Oppland during the term 2013–2017. He hails from Østre Toten Municipality and was from 2011 the deputy county mayor of Oppland.

He was also the deputy chair of Norsk Kulturarv.
