= Gravdahl =

Gravdahl is a Norwegian surname. Notable people with the surname include:

- Gunnar Gravdahl (1927–2015), Norwegian politician
- Reidun Gravdahl (born 1948), Norwegian politician
