= Johannes Bøe =

Johannes Bøe may refer to:

- Johannes Thingnes Bø (born 1993), Norwegian biathlete
- Johannes Bøe (archaeologist) (1891–1971), Norwegian archaeologist
- Johannes A. Bøe (1882–1970), Norwegian politician
- Johannes P. Bøe (1774–1859), Norwegian politician
