= Marit Knutsdatter Strand =

Norwegian politician (born 1992)

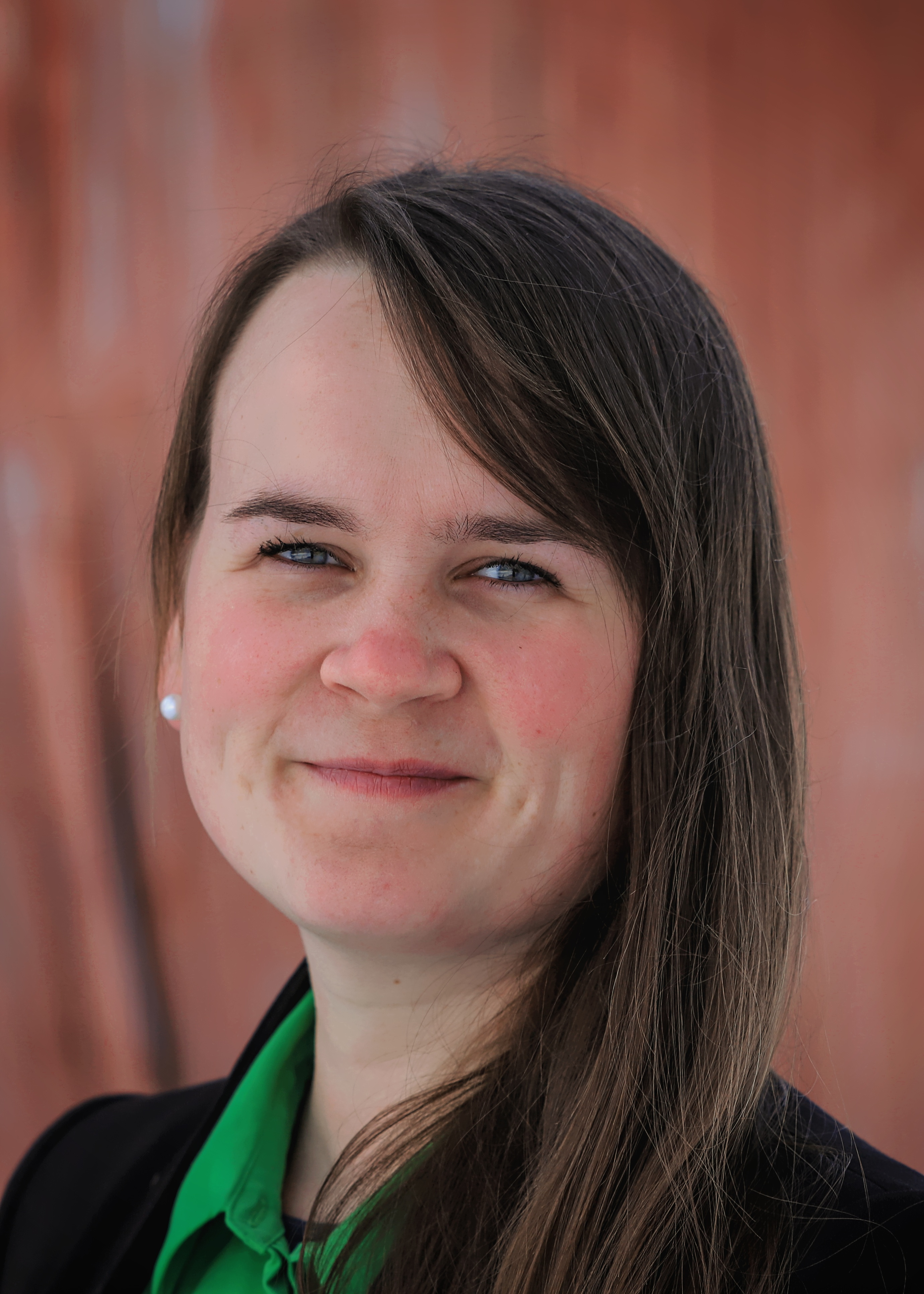
- Knutsdatter Strand in 2021

Member of the Norwegian Parliament
- In office 1 October 2017 – 30 September 2025
- Constituency: Oppland

Personal details
- Born: 27 April 1992 (age 34) Lørenskog, Akershus, Norway
- Party: Centre
- Children: 3
- Education: Norwegian University of Life Sciences
- Occupation: Politician

Marit Knutsdatter Strand (born 27 April 1992) is a Norwegian politician of the Centre Party. She served as a representative to the Storting for Oppland between 2017 and 2025.

== Education ==
She attended Valdres upper secondary school from 2008 to 2011, and studied at the Norwegian University of Life Sciences from 2012 to 2017.

== Political career ==
=== Youth league ===
Knutsdatter Strand was leader of the Oppland Centre Youth from 2012 to 2014, and then leader of the Ås Centre Students from 2014 to 2015. She was also a member of the central board of the Centre Youth from 2015 to 2016. She was also chairwoman of the board of the Centre Party's Student Union in 2018.

=== Parliament ===
She was elected to the Storting in 2017, where she currently serves on the Standing Committee on Education and Research, where she also serves as first vice chair. She headed the Centre Party electoral list in Oppland for the 2021 election.

In 2025, she announced that she wouldn't be seeking re-election at that year's election due to family reasons.

== Personal life ==
She and her family reside in Valdres. She has three children.
