= Rolf Furuseth =

Norwegian politician

Member of the Norwegian Parliament for Oppland
- In office 1969–1981

Personal details
- Born: 27 September 1915 Vestre Toten Municipality, Oppland, Norway
- Died: 16 May 1984 (aged 68)
- Party: Labour

Rolf Furuseth (born 27 September 1915 in Vestre Toten Municipality, died 16 May 1984) was a Norwegian politician for the Labour Party.

He was elected to the Norwegian Parliament from Oppland in 1969, and was re-elected on two occasions. He had previously served as a deputy representative during the terms 1958–1961 and 1965–1969.

On the local level he was a member of the municipal council of Vestre Toten Municipality from 1955 to 1971, the last three terms in the executive committee. He chaired the municipal party chapter from 1962 to 1963.

Outside politics he worked at Raufoss Ammunisjonsfabrikker. He became involved in the trade union there.
