= Arne Rostad =

Norwegian politician

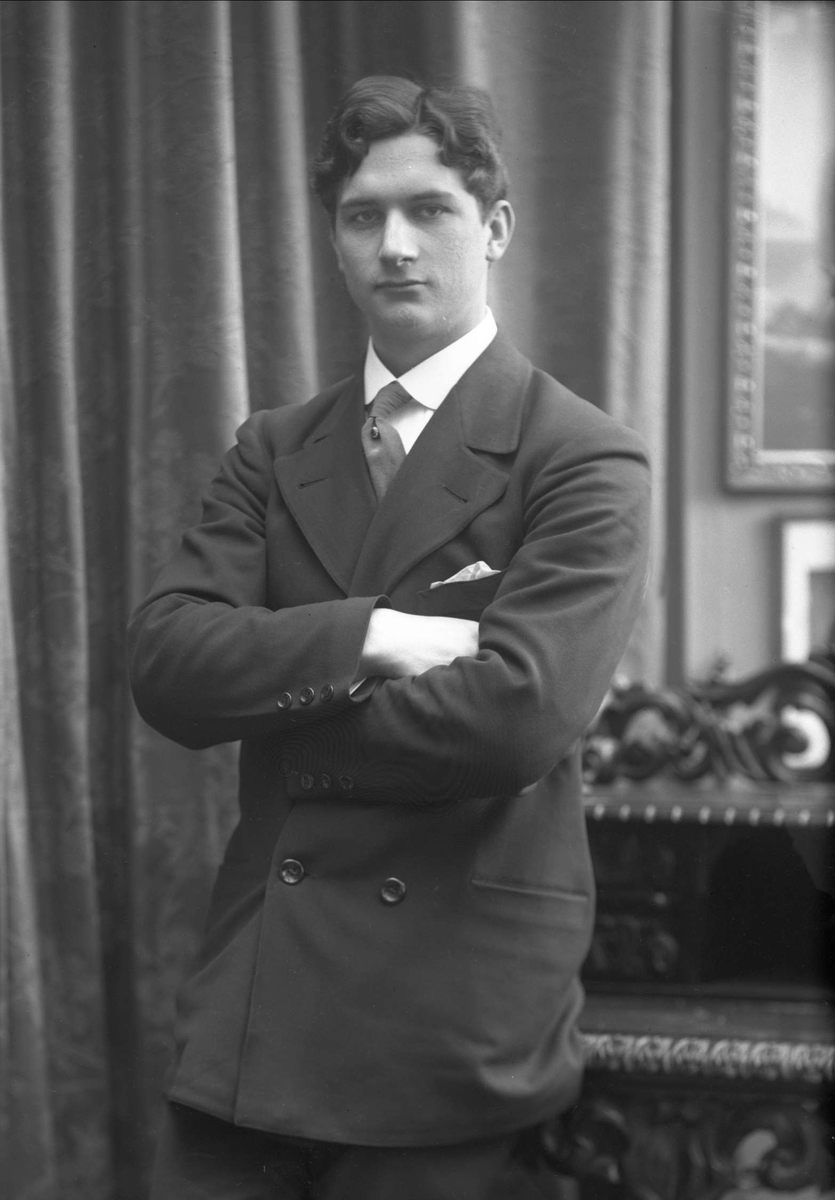
Arne Rostad

Arne Rostad (4 March 1894 – 21 June 1969) was a Norwegian politician for the Farmers' Party.

He was elected to the Norwegian Parliament from Oppland in 1945, but he was not re-elected in 1949.

Born in Verdal Municipality, Rostad was a member of municipal council for Vardal Municipality from 1925 to 1940.

Outside politics he worked as a farmer. He was declared Knight of the Order of St. Olav in 1964.
