= Anders Tyvand =

Norwegian politician

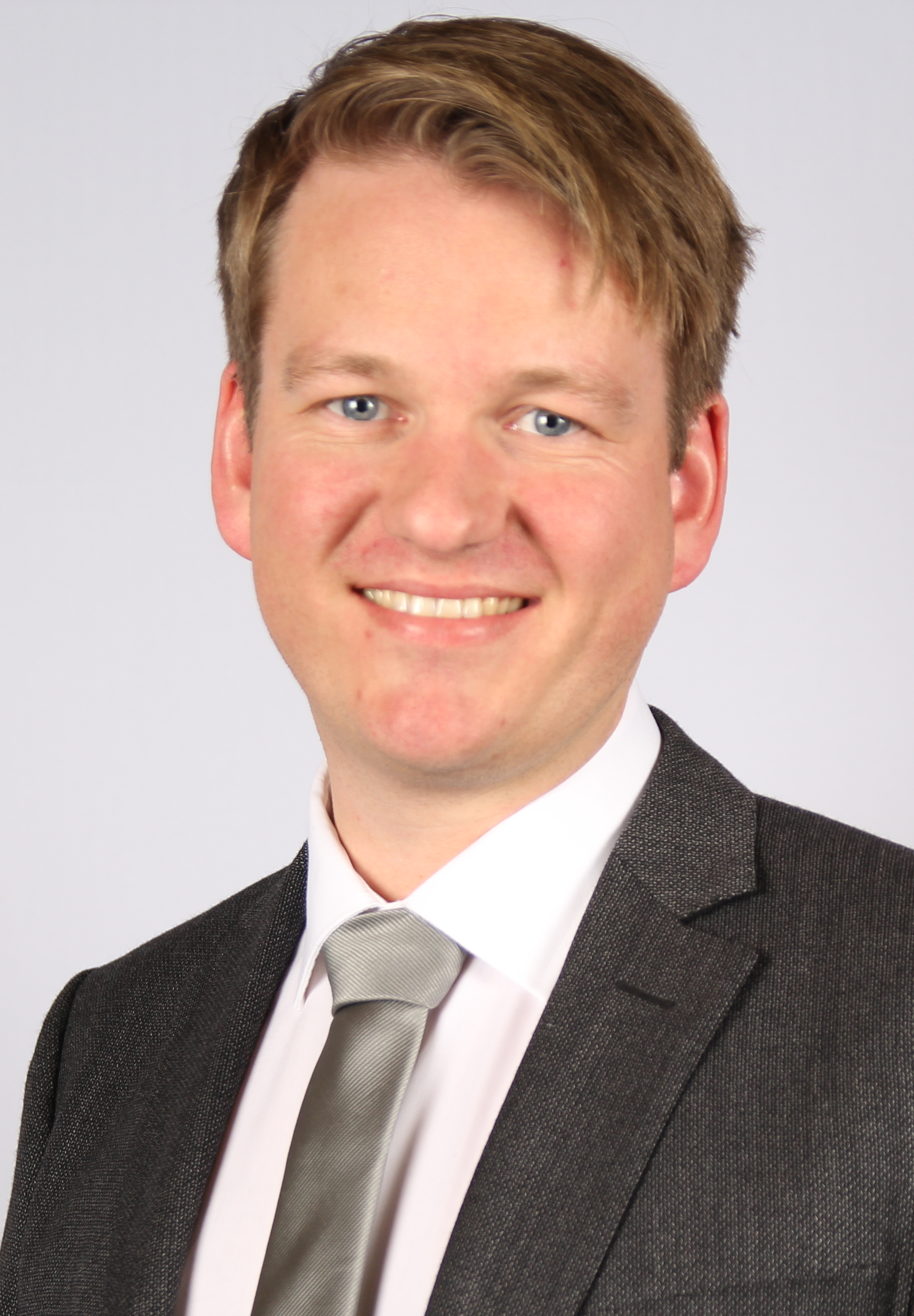
- Born: 14 May 1980 (age 45)
- Occupation: Politician
- Known for: Member of the Storting

Anders Tyvand (born 14 May 1980) is a Norwegian politician for the Christian Democratic Party. He was elected to the Parliament of Norway from Vestfold in 2013 where he is member of the Standing Committee on Education, Research and Church Affairs.
