= Inger S. Enger =

Norwegian politician

Inger S. Enger (born 6 July 1948, in Trøgstad) is a Norwegian politician for the Centre Party (SP). She was elected to the Norwegian Parliament from Oppland in 2001.

Previously she was mayor of Gausdal municipality from 1994 to 2001 (deputy mayor 1991–94). She is the sister of Anne Enger Lahnstein.

== Parliamentary Committee duties ==
- 2005 - 2009 deputy member of the Electoral Committee.
- 2005 - 2009 member of the Standing Committee on Education, Research and Church Affairs.
- 2001 - 2005 member of the Standing Committee on Energy and the Environment.
