= Kristian Ørud =

Norwegian politician

Kristian Ørud (27 February 1878 – 2 July 1946) was a Norwegian farmer and politician for the Agrarian Party.

He was born in the village of Skjefstad in Østre Toten Municipality as a son of farmer Olaus Hval (1855–1927) and Auline Skjefstad (1855–1927). He took some education in his district, and took over the family farm in 1904. He was also involved in the Norwegian Agrarian Association. He was a board member of the Agrarian Party's county chapter from 1921 to 1938. He was a member of Østre Toten municipal council from 1913 to 1928, serving as mayor from 1922 to 1925. From 1925 to 1928 he was a member of Oppland "county council" (fylkesråd). He served as a deputy representative to the Parliament of Norway during the terms 1922–1924 and 1925–1927, and was elected as a full representative in 1927, 1930 and 1933, representing Oppland.

From 1939 to 1945 he was a manager in the Bank of Norway department in Gjøvik. During the occupation of Norway by Nazi Germany he was a member of the Fascist party Nasjonal Samling. After the occupation ended he fell from grace. He was to be tried in court during the legal purge in Norway after World War II, but died before it happened.
