= Torger Hovi =

Norwegian politician

Torger Hovi (23 January 1905 – 19 October 1980) was a Norwegian politician for the Labour Party.

He was elected to the Norwegian Parliament from Oppland in 1961, and was re-elected on two occasions. He had previously served three terms as a deputy representative.

Hovi was born in Øystre Slidre and was deputy mayor of Øystre Slidre Municipality from 1959–1961. In total he held various positions there from 1937 to 1962.
