= Ola O. Røssum =

Norwegian politician

Ola O. Røssum (10 May 1926, Nord-Fron – 29 May 2012) was a Norwegian politician who was a member of the Centre Party.

He was elected to the Norwegian Parliament from Oppland in 1969, and was re-elected on two occasions. He had previously served as a deputy representative during the 1965–1969 term.

On the local level he was a member of the executive committee of the municipal council of Nord-Fron Municipality from 1965 to 1967, and then of the municipal council of Fron Municipality from 1967 to 1971.

He studied at the Norwegian College of Agriculture from 1956 to 1959, and was then research assistant there for one year. From 1960 he worked for the Norwegian Agrarian Association; from 1965 to 1998 he was employed as a farmer.
