= Anne Tingelstad Wøien =

Norwegian politician

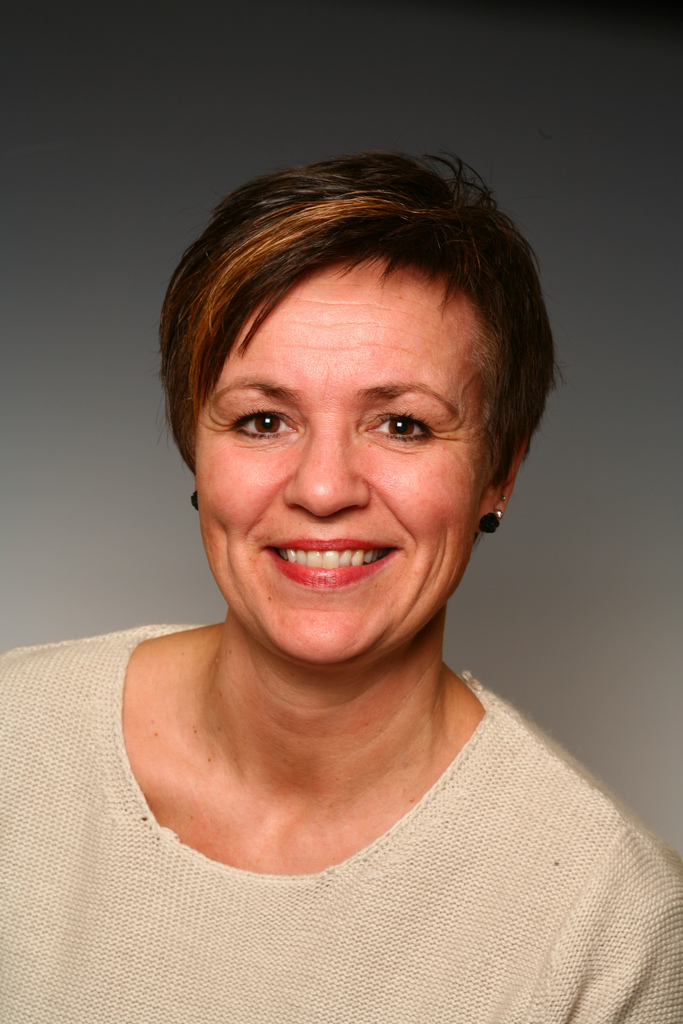

Member of Parliament for Oppland
- In office 1 October 2009 – 30 September 2017

Personal details
- Born: 18 June 1965 (age 61) Ringerike, Buskerud, Norway
- Party: Centre
- Spouse: Mikael Wøien
- Children: 3
- Occupation: Politician
- Profession: Teacher

Anne Tingelstad Wøien is a Norwegian politician from Innlandet county, representing the Centre Party. She was a member of parliament for Oppland between 2009 and 2017. She sat on the Standing Committee on Education, Research and Church Affairs.

Wøien was leader of Centre Youth's chapter in Oppland between 1990 and 1991. She was a member of the municipal council for Gran Municipality and the group leader of her party from 1995 to 2003, and member of the Oppland county council from 2003 to 2005. She was political advisor to the oil and energy minister Odd Roger Enoksen between 2005 and 2007, then to the transportation and communications minister Liv Signe Navarsete between 2007 and 2009. She was a member of the Centre Party's central board between 2003 and 2009.

Wøien is the daughter of Marit Tingelstad who was a member of parliament between 1993 and 2001, and Hans Tingelstad who was a farmer.
