= Finn Krokeide =

Norwegian politician (born 1986)

Member of the Storting
- Incumbent
- Assumed office 1 October 2025
- Constituency: Oppland

Personal details
- Born: 15 July 1986 (age 39)
- Party: Progress Party

Finn Krokeide (born 15 July 1986) is a Norwegian politician who was elected member of the Storting in 2025. He is a municipal councillor of Gjøvik.
