= Bjarne Lyngstad =

Norwegian politician (1901–1971)

Minister of Agriculture
- In office 12 October 1965 – 21 August 1970
- Prime Minister: Per Borten
- Preceded by: Leif Granli
- Succeeded by: Hallvard Eika

Minister of Local Government
- In office 28 August 1963 – 25 September 1963
- Prime Minister: John Lyng
- Preceded by: Oskar Skogly
- Succeeded by: Jens Haugland

Member of the Norwegian Parliament
- In office 1 October 1961 – 30 September 1969
- Constituency: Nord-Trøndelag

Personal details
- Born: 9 January 1901 Inderøy Municipality, Nord-Trøndelag, Norway
- Died: 4 September 1971 (aged 70)
- Party: Liberal
- Occupation: Politician; Farmer

Bjarne Lyngstad (9 January 1901 – 4 September 1971) was a Norwegian politician for the Liberal Party.

He was born in Inderøy Municipality.

From August to September 1963 he served as the Minister of Local Government and Work Affairs during the short-lived centre-right cabinet Lyng. When another centre-right cabinet was formed in 1965, under Prime Minister Per Borten, Lyngstad was appointed Minister of Agriculture and held this position until 21 August 1970.

He was elected to the Norwegian Parliament from Nord-Trøndelag in 1961 and was re-elected on one occasion. During his stints as cabinet member, which included the entire second term, he was replaced by deputy representative Ola H. Kveli. Lyngstad had served in the position of deputy representative during the terms 1954–1957 and 1958–1961.

Lyngstad was a long-time member of the municipal council of Inderøy Municipality, serving as deputy mayor in the periods 1945–1947 and 1955 to 1961 and mayor from 1947 to 1952.

Political offices
Preceded by Oskar Skogly	Minister of Local Government and Labour; August 1963–September 1963	Succeeded by Jens Haugland
Preceded by Leif Granli	Minister of Agriculture; 1965–1970	Succeeded by Hallvard Eika
