= Rune Støstad =

Norwegian politician

- Born: 8 January 1972 (age 54)
- Education: Volda University College; BI Norwegian Business School
- Occupation: Politician
- Political party: Labour Party

Rune Støstad (born 8 January 1972) is a Norwegian politician for the Labour Party. From 2021 he represents Oppland and the Labour Party at the Parliament.

== Career ==
Born on 8 January 1972, Støstad is a journalist by education from the Volda University College, and also has a degree from the BI Norwegian Business School. Hailing from Vinstra, he was a member of the municipal council of Nord-Fron Municipality from 2011, and was mayor in Nord-Fron from to 2015 to 2021.

He was elected representative to the Storting from the constituency of Oppland for the period 2021–2025, for the Labour Party. From 2025 to 2026, he served as one of the party's deputy parliamentary leaders.
