= Torstein Rudihagen =

Norwegian politician

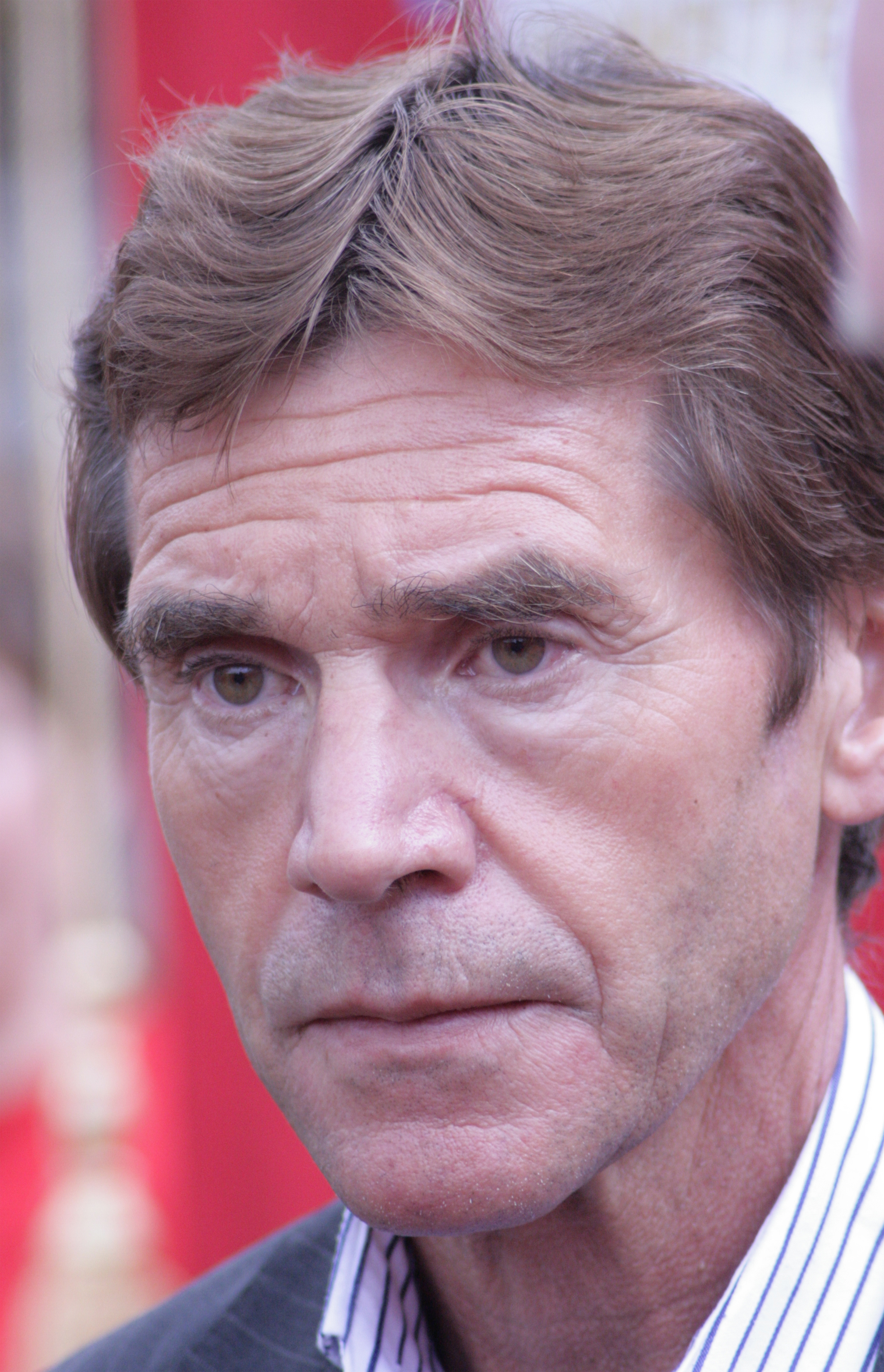
Torstein Rudihagen (2009)

Torstein Rudihagen (born 14 August 1952 in Sør-Fron Municipality) is a Norwegian politician for the Labour Party.

In his early career, he worked as a teacher. He began his political career on the municipal council of Sør-Fron Municipality, to which he was elected in 1983. He later became mayor, a seat he filled from 1991 to 1997. On 3 March 1995 he was appointed State Secretary in the Ministry of Transport, under the Brundtland's Third Cabinet. When Brundtland resigned and Thorbjørn Jagland formed a new government, Rudihagen retained his job as State Secretary. However, he lost the job when the cabinet fell in 1997.

In the election of 1997, he was elected to the Parliament of Norway from his home county of Oppland. He has been re-elected on two occasions.
