= Lars Rem =

Norwegian politician (born 1966)

Member of the Storting
- Incumbent
- Assumed office 1 October 2025
- Constituency: Oppland

Personal details
- Born: 16 June 1966 (age 59)
- Party: Progress Party

Lars Terje Høiendahl Rem (born 16 June 1966) is a Norwegian politician from the Progress Party (FrP). He was elected to the Storting in the 2025 Norwegian parliamentary election.
