= Martin Smeby =

Norwegian politician

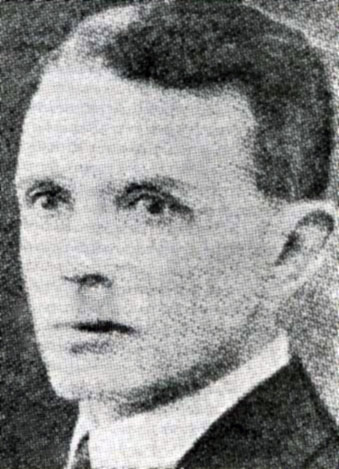
Martin Smeby

Martin Smeby (8 September 1891 – 1 February 1975) was a Norwegian politician for the Labour Party.

He was born in Søndre Land Municipality.

He was elected to the Norwegian Parliament from Oppland in 1936, and was re-elected on four occasions. He had previously served in the position of deputy representative during the term 1928–1930.

Smeby became a member of the municipal council for Søndre Land Municipality in 1919. He soon became deputy mayor, a position he held in 1922–1925 and 1937–1939. He served as mayor in 1928–1931, 1931–1933, 1940 and 1945.
