= Bengt Fasteraune =

Norwegian politician (born 1964)

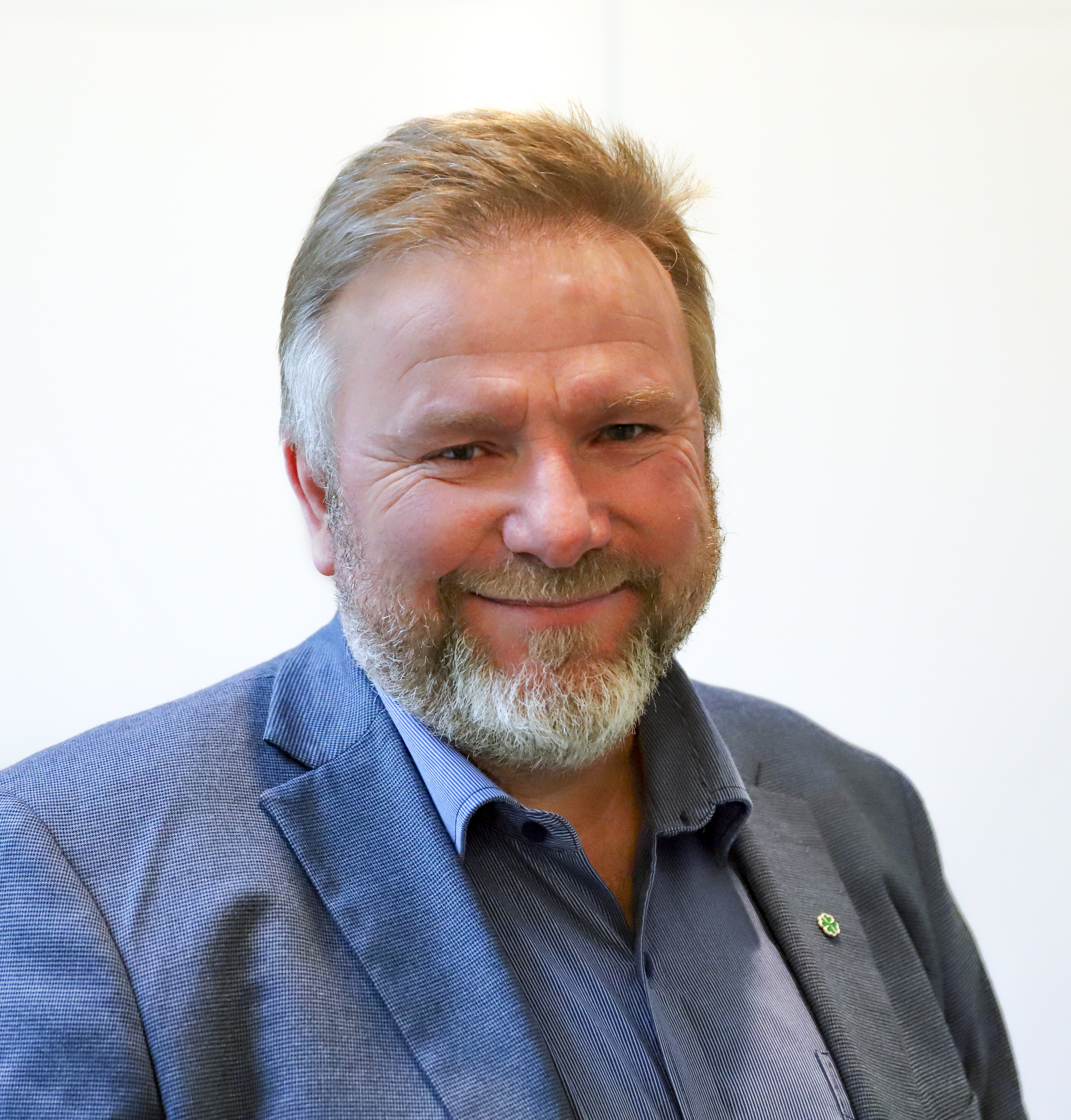
- Fasteraune in 2020

Member of the Storting
- Incumbent
- Assumed office 5 October 2018
- Preceded by: Ivar Odnes
- Constituency: Oppland

Deputy Member of the Storting
- In office 1 October 2017 – 5 October 2018
- Constituency: Oppland

Mayor of Dovre
- In office 2007–2018
- Preceded by: Erland Anton Lie Løkken (Sp)
- Succeeded by: Oddny Garmo (Sp)

Personal details
- Born: 3 June 1964 (age 62)
- Party: Centre

Bengt Fasteraune (born 3 June 1964) is a Norwegian politician for the Centre Party.

He served as a deputy representative to the Parliament of Norway from Oppland during the term 2017–2021. When regular representative Ivar Odnes died in October 2018, Fasteraune took his place as a regular. He assumed a seat in the Standing Committee on Transport and Communications. Hailing from Dovre Municipality, he served as mayor there from 2007 to 2018.
