= Ketil Kjenseth =

Norwegian politician

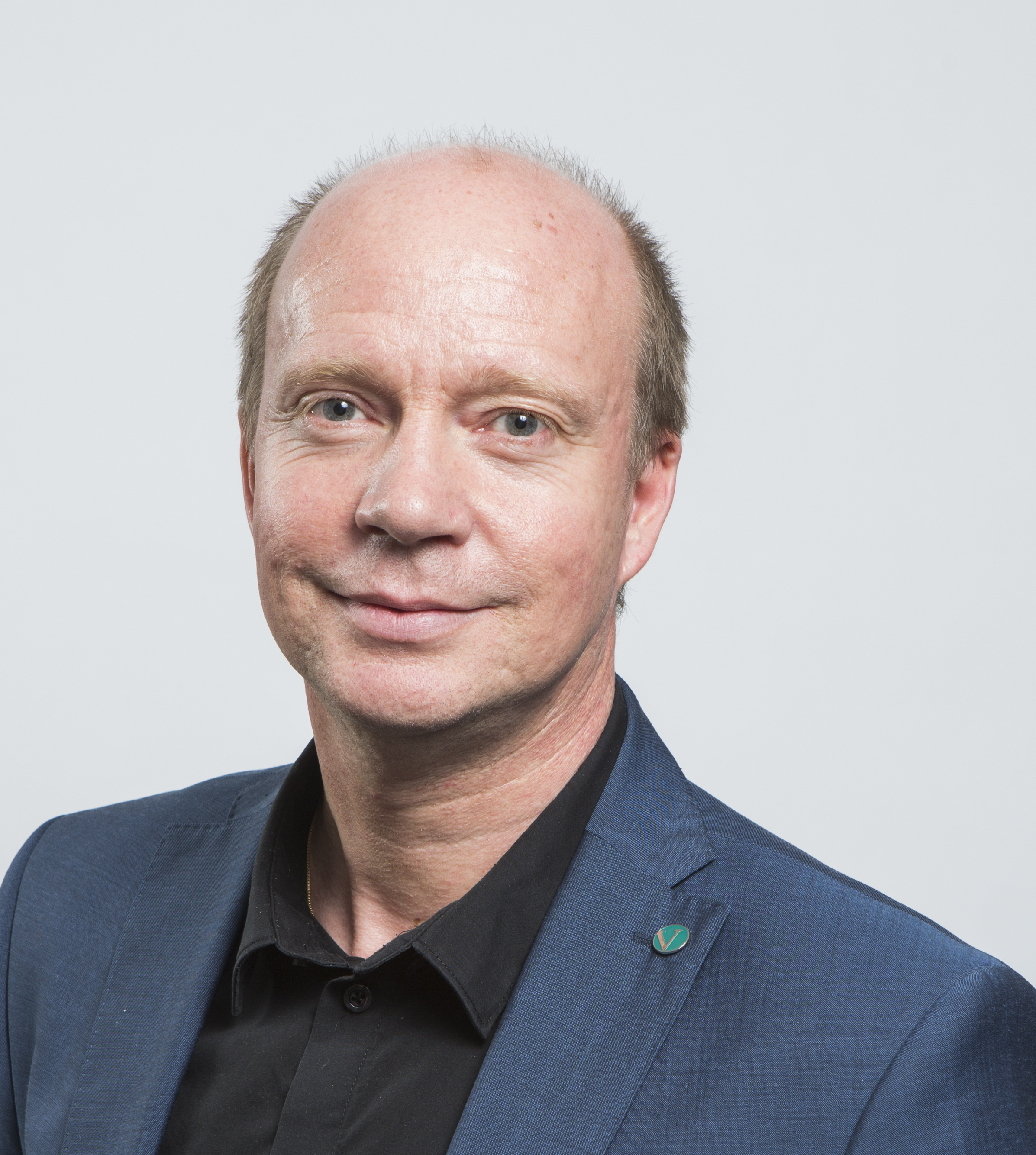
- Kjenseth in 2015
- Born: 13 August 1968 (age 57); Lillehammer, Norway
- Occupation(s): Schoolteacher; Politician
- Known for: Member of the Storting

Ketil Kjenseth (born 13 August 1968) is a Norwegian schoolteacher and politician for the Liberal Party.

== Personal life ==
Kjenseth was born in Lillehammer to Kristen Kjenseth and Gerd Lovise Kjenseth, and grew up in Biri Øverbygd.

== Career ==
Kjenseth was elected to the Parliament of Norway from Oppland in 2013 where he was member of the Standing Committee on Health and Care Services. He was again elected representative to the Storting for the period 2017–2021, and is a member of the Standing Committee on Local Government and Public Administration.
