= Ola Torstensen Lyngstad =

Norwegian newspaper editor and politician

Ola Torstensen Lyngstad (7 October 1894 – 11 February 1952) was a Norwegian newspaper editor and politician for the Liberal Party.

He was elected to the Parliament of Norway from Oppland in 1945, but was not re-elected in 1949.

He chaired the district chapter of the Liberal Party in Sør-Gudbrandsdalen from 1936 to 1950, and the county chapter in Oppland from 1945 to 1950. From 1946 he was a member of the national party board.

He was born in Øystre Slidre Municipality, he took an education as an agronomist. He spent most of his career as county agronomist in Oppland, from 1927 to 1952. He had been editor-in-chief of Vårt land from 1921 to 1922 and Småbrukaren from 1922 to 1925.

He was a member of the board of the Norwegian Farmers' and Smallholders' Union from 1924 to 1925, and chaired the county chapter from 1934 to 1950. He chaired the Norwegian Association of Sheep and Goat Farmers from 1946 to 1952.
