= Tore Hagebakken =

Norwegian politician (born 1961)

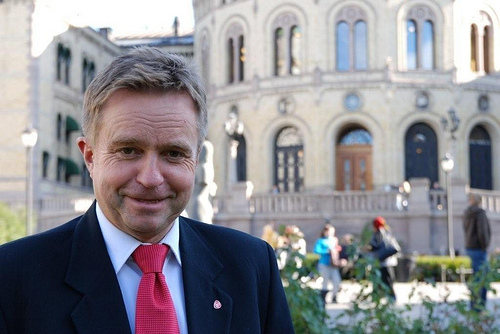
Tore Hagebakken

Tore Hagebakken (born 8 January 1961 in Vestre Toten Municipality) is a Norwegian politician for the Labour Party.

He was elected to the Norwegian Parliament from Oppland in 2005. He had previously served in the position of deputy representative during the terms 1985–1989 and 1989–1993.

Between 2000 and 2001, during the first cabinet Stoltenberg, Hagebakken was appointed State Secretary in the Ministry of Health and Social Affairs.

Hagebakken was a member of the municipal council for Gjøvik Municipality from 1979 to 1983, later serving as deputy mayor from 1991 to 2005.
