= Kristine Rusten =

Norwegian politician

Kristine Rusten (6 July 1940 - 3 December 2003) was a Norwegian politician for the Labour Party. Outside politics she worked as a shopkeeper.

Born in Lom Municipality, Rusten was elected to the Norwegian Parliament from Oppland in 1977, and was re-elected on one occasion. At a local level, she was a member of the executive committee of the municipal council of Lom Municipality from 1971 to 1975. She chaired the local party chapter from 1976 to 1977.
