= Anton Ryen =

Norwegian politician

Anton Ryen (15 December 1894 – 17 February 1968) was a Norwegian politician for the Farmers' Party.

He was born in Vaage Municipality (now spelled Vågå).

He was elected to the Norwegian Parliament from Oppland in 1945, and was re-elected on two occasions.
