= Åge Hovengen =

Norwegian politician (1927–2018)

Åge Hovengen (21 December 1927 – 19 October 2018) was a Norwegian politician for the Labour Party. He was born in Brandbu Municipality.

He was elected to the Norwegian Parliament from Oppland in 1977, and was re-elected on two occasions. He had previously served as a deputy representative during the term 1973–1977. From 1973 to 1976 he met as a regular representative, filling the seat of Thorstein Treholt who was appointed to the second cabinet Bratteli.

On the local level he was a member of the municipal council for Vestre Slidre Municipality from 1963 to 1977.

Outside politics he worked as a car mechanic. He was also active in the Norwegian Farmers and Smallholders Union.

In 2002 he received the Fritt Ord Honorary Award. He died in 2018 at the age of 90.
