= Espen Johnsen (politician) =

Norwegian politician

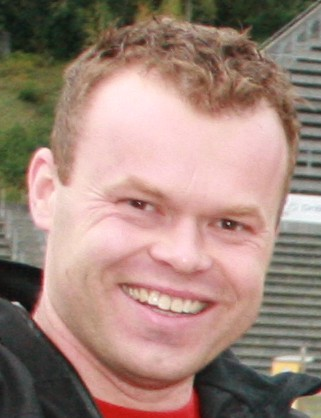
Espen Johnsen

Espen Johnsen (born 17 October 1976 in Lillehammer) is a Norwegian politician for the Labour Party.

He was elected to the Norwegian Parliament from Oppland in 2005. He had previously served as a deputy representative during the term 2001–2005.

On the local level he was a member of the Oppland county council from 1999 to 2005. Since 2002 he is the leader of the county party chapter, as well as a member of the Labour Party national board.

He grew up in Vestre Slidre Municipality, and graduated from Lillehammer University College.

In 2011 he was elected to mayor of Lillehammer Municipality.
