= Einar Borch =

Norwegian politician (1870–1952)

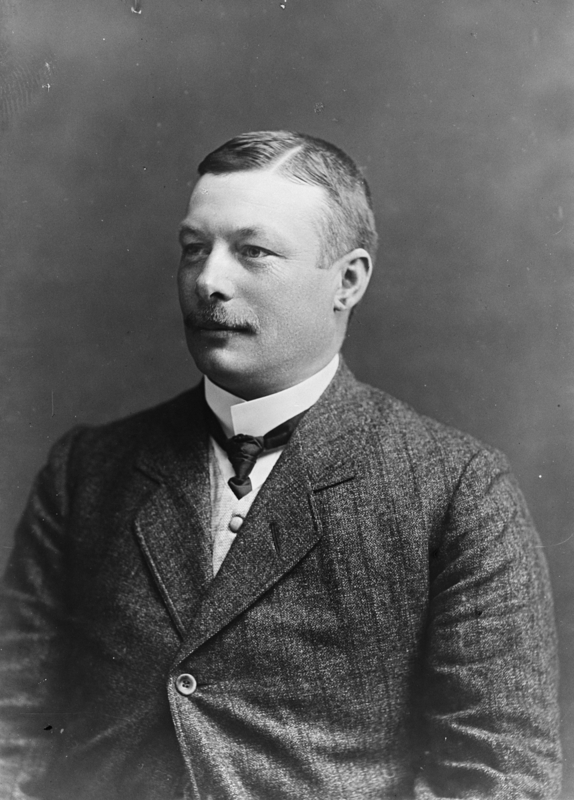
- Born: 14 September 1870; Stavanger, Norway
- Died: 1952 (aged 81–82)
- Occupation: Politician
- Known for: Member of the Storting

Einar Gram Borch (14 September 1870 – 1952) was a Norwegian land owner and politician.

He was born in Stavanger to Karl Tank Anker Borch and Sara Johanne Birkeland. He was elected representative to the Storting for the periods 1922–1924, 1925–1927 and 1937–1945, for the Farmers' Party.

Borch settled as farmer in Jevnaker, taking over the family estate Mo c.1890. He took part in local politics and served as mayor of Jevnaker 1902–1907.

He was a board member of the Norwegian Forestry Society, and member of the representative council of both Borregaard and Norges Bank.

Borch was decorated Commander of the Order of St. Olav in 1934, and was honored with the Order of the White Rose of Finland.
