= Thore A. Nistad =

Norwegian politician (born 1949)

Thore Aksel Nistad (born 23 May 1949, in Oslo) is a Norwegian politician for the Progress Party.

He was elected to the Norwegian Parliament from Oppland in 1997, and has been re-elected on two occasions.

Nistad was a member of Gjøvik municipality council from 1991 to 2003 and from 2005 to 2007. From 1983 to 1999, he was also involved in the Oppland county council.
