= Reidun Gravdahl =

Norwegian politician

Reidun Gravdahl, née Engen (born 12 January 1948 in Østre Toten Municipality) is a profiled Norwegian politician for the Labour Party.

Outside politics she worked at Raufoss Ammunisjonsfabrikker from 1978, and became involved in the trade union there. She joined the Labour Party and was eventually elected to the Norwegian Parliament from Oppland in 2001. She served as a deputy representative during the terms 1993–1997 and 2001–2005.

On the local level she was elected to Oppland county council in 2003, and became deputy county mayor following the 2007 election.
