= Harald Løbak Thoresen =

Norwegian politician

Harald Løbak Thoresen (born 14 August 1937) is a Norwegian politician for the Labour Party.

He was born in Elverum as a son of Thore Jakob Thoresen (1905–1972) and Magnhild Sofie Løbak (1902–1985). He finished school in Elverum in 1958, and after Luftvernartilleriets befalskole whence he graduated in 1960, he studied at the University of Oslo from 1964 to 1969. He worked in Forsvarsbygg from 1963 to 2002. He was also an able middle distance runner for IL i BUL, with personal best times of 1:53.7 in the 800 metres and 3:52.7 in the 1500 metres, both achieved in 1964. With BUL he won the road relay Holmenkollstafetten.

He served as a deputy representative to the Parliament of Norway from Akershus during the terms 1989–1993 and 1993–1997. From July to September 1992 he was a regular representative meeting in place of Reiulf Steen. In total, he was present during 207 days of parliamentary session.

He was a member of the municipal council for Enebakk Municipality from 1971 to 1983, serving as deputy mayor from 1978 to 1979. He was also a member of Akershus county council from 1986 to 1991, and a deputy member in 1979–1985 and 1991–1995. He has chaired the local party branch in two periods.

In addition to various positions in Akershus County Municipality, he was a member of the administrative board of Akershus Central Hospital from 1983 to 1987 and board member of Fetsund Lenser from 1991 to 2003. He was engaged in local history, and chaired Arbeiderbevegelsens historielag i Akershus from 1987 to 1993 with a term as editor of their yearbook from 1999 to 2000. In 2011 he released the book Fladeby Cellulosefabrik. Folkene og bygda.
