= Peder I. Ramsrud =

Norwegian politician

Peder I. Ramsrud (10 February 1923 – 10 June 2014) was a Norwegian politician for the Progress Party.

He was born in Fåberg Municipality in February 1923.

Ramsrud was elected to the Norwegian Parliament from Oppland in 1989, but was not re-elected in 1993. He was a member of the municipal council for Østre Toten Municipality from 1977 to 1985. From 1981 to 1991 he held various positions in Oppland county council.
