= Anne Lise Fredlund =

Norwegian politician

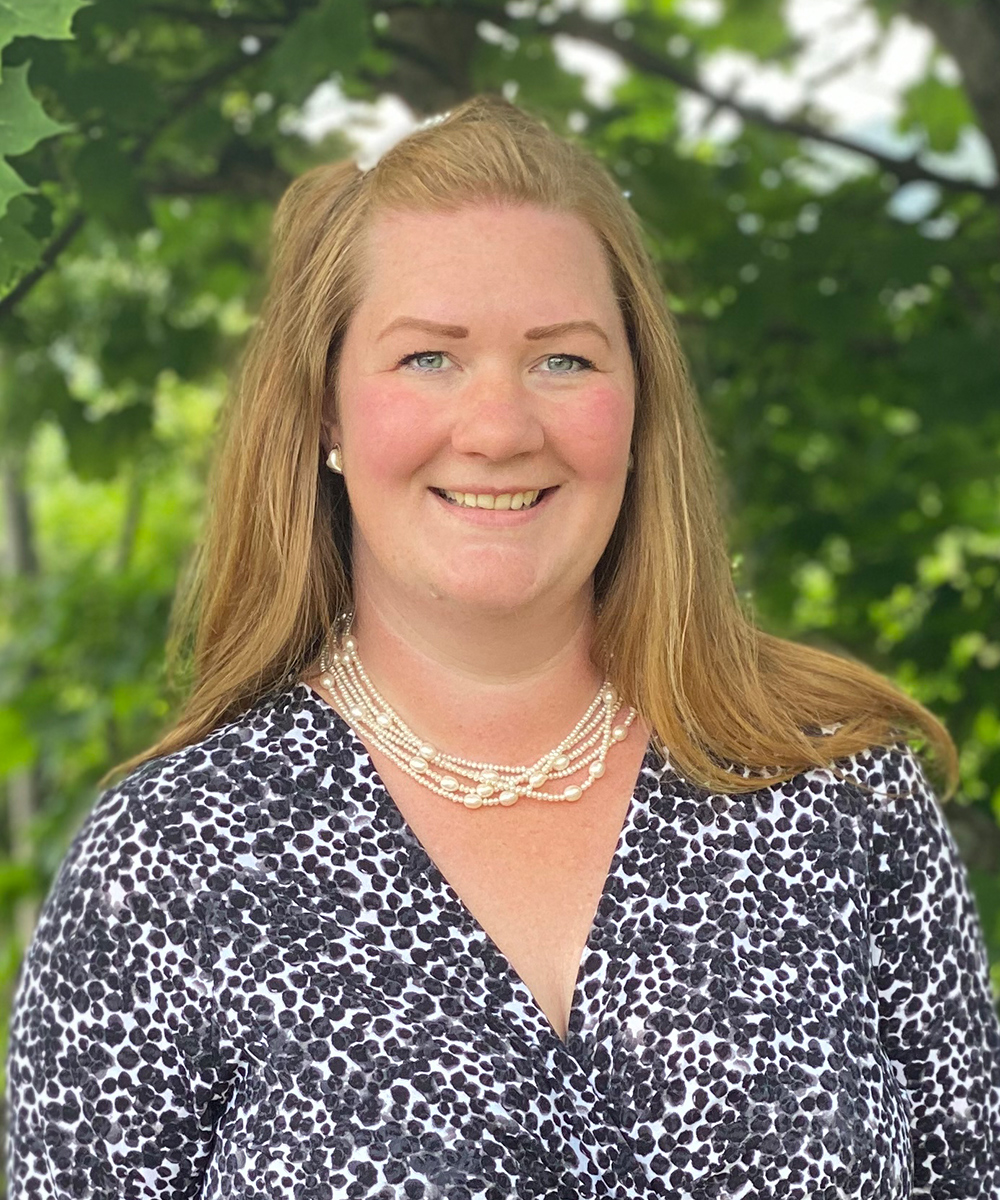

Member of the Storting
- Incumbent
- Assumed office 2025
- Constituency: Oppland

Personal details
- Party: Socialist Left Party

Anne Lise Fredlund is a Norwegian politician for the Socialist Left Party. She has been a member of the Storting since 2025.

== See also ==
- List of members of the Storting, 2025–2029
