= Harald U. Lied =

Norwegian politician (1927–2002)

Harald Ulfert Lied (29 April 1927 – 21 December 2002) was a Norwegian politician for the Conservative Party.

He was born in Sarpsborg. Outside politics he worked in forestry and farming. He was active in the Norwegian Agrarian Association.

On the local level he was a member of Gjøvik municipal council from 1967 to 1973. He chaired the local party chapter from 1967 to 1968 and the county chapter from 1968 to 1974 and 1976 to 1978. In the same periods he was a member of the central party board. He was elected to the Norwegian Parliament from Oppland in 1973, and was re-elected on three occasions.
