= Per Mellesmo =

Norwegian politician

Per Mellesmo (15 September 1919 in Vågå – 21 March 1997) was a Norwegian politician for the Labour Party.

He was elected to the Norwegian Parliament from Oppland in 1965, and was re-elected on two occasions. He had previously served as a deputy representative during the terms 1954–1957, 1958–1961 and 1961–1965.

On the local level she was a member of the municipal council for Nord-Fron Municipality from 1951 to 1963 and 1979 to 1987. From 1967 to 1971 she was also a member of Oppland county council. He chaired the municipal party chapter for several periods.

Outside politics he worked as a gardener in Biri, Sandnes, Moss, Denmark, and finally Vinstra.
