= Liv Andersen =

Norwegian politician (1919–1997)

Liv Andersen (9 August 1919 in Oslo – 21 March 1997) was a Norwegian politician for the Labour Party.

She was elected to the Norwegian Parliament from Oppland in 1969, and was re-elected on three occasions. She had previously served as a deputy representative during the term 1965–1969.

On the local level she was a member of the executive committee of Gjøvik municipality council from 1963 to 1971. From 1967 to 1971 she was also a member of Oppland county council. She chaired the county party chapter from 1967 to 1970.
