= Eilef A. Meland =

Norwegian economist, university lecturer and politician

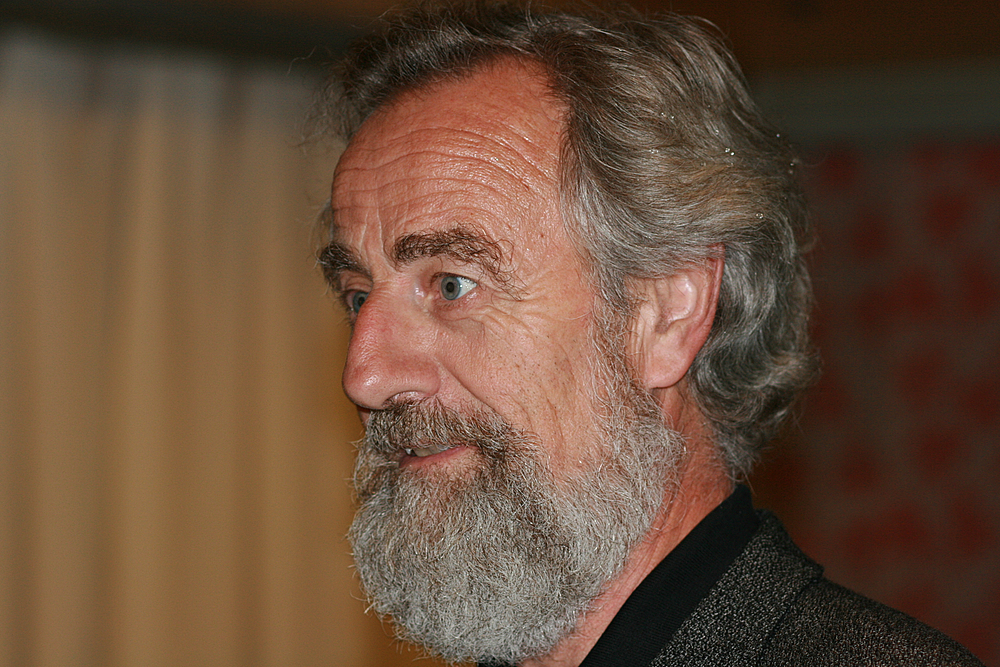
- Meland in 2008
- Born: 12 April 1947 (age 79); Haugesund, Norway
- Education: University of Oslo
- Occupation: Politician
- Employer: University of Stavanger

Eilef A. Meland (born 12 April 1947) is a Norwegian economist, university lecturer and politician.

== Biography ==
Meland was born in Haugesund on 12 April 1947 to Johannes Meland and Magnhild Eeg-Olsen. He was elected representative to the Storting for the period 1989–1993 from the constituency of Rogaland, for the Socialist Left Party, and reelected for the period 1993–1997.
