= Eva R. Finstad =

Norwegian politician

Eva Rolstad Finstad (6 August 1933 – 8 June 1998) was a Norwegian politician for the Conservative Party.

She was born in Nes.

She was elected to the Norwegian Parliament from Akershus in 1989, and was re-elected on one occasion. She had previously served in the position of deputy representative during the terms 1981–1985 and 1985–1989. From 1981 to 1986 she filled in for Rolf Presthus meanwhile he was appointed to the first and second cabinet Willoch. Presthus returned to his seat in Parliament when the cabinet Willoch fell, but died in January 1988 and was again replaced by Finstad.

Finstad was a deputy member of the executive committee of Nes municipality council in the periods 1979–1983 and 1987–1989. She chaired the local party chapter from 1978 to 1980.

Outside politics she worked as a school teacher, having studied German language and political science.
