= Lars Velsand =

Norwegian politician

- Born: 9 September 1941 (age 84); Gran Municipality, Norway
- Occupation: Politician
- Political party: Centre Party

Lars Velsand (born 9 September 1941) is a Norwegian politician.

He was born in Gran Municipality to farmers Torstein Velsand and Aslaug Skøien. He was elected representative to the Storting for the period 1981–1985 for the Centre Party. He was reelected for the period 1985–1989.
