= Reidar Johansen =

Norwegian politician (born 1955)

Reidar Johansen (born 18 May 1955 in Hammerfest) is a Norwegian politician for the Socialist Left Party. He was elected to the Norwegian Parliament from Finnmark in 1989, and was re-elected on one occasion. Johansen was involved in local politics in Sørøysund Municipality and later in Hammerfest Municipality between 1983 and 1989.
