= Ulf Guttormsen =

Norwegian politician (born 1942)

Ulf Guttormsen (born 9 September 1942) is a Norwegian politician for the Labour Party.

He was elected to the Norwegian Parliament from Sør-Trøndelag in 1989, and was re-elected on one occasion. He had previously served as a deputy representative during the term 1977–1981.

Guttormsen was a member of Sør-Trøndelag county council during the term 1987–1991. He was a member of the national party board from 1987 to 1989.

Outside politics, he worked as a mechanic and is involved in labour unions.
