= Johannes A. Bøe =

Norwegian politician

Johannes Andreassen Bøe (29 December 1882 – October 1970) was a Norwegian politician for the Labour Party.

He was born at Bøe in Herøy Municipality as a son of auto dealers and farmers Andreas Hansen Bøe (1857–1937) and Rasmine Johannesdatter (1858–1941). He graduated from Elverum Teachers' College in 1905, and worked as a teacher in the town of Aalesund from 1906, Balsfjord Municipality from 1907, Herøy Municipality from 1909, Nordre Land Municipality from 1911 and Eidskog Municipality from 1914. In 1915, he was hired at Randsfjord Folk High School in Jevnaker Municipality, where he was a head teacher from 1920 to 1942. During the German occupation of Norway he was a resistance movement member. He was the leader of B-org in Western Norway in 1945.

He served as deputy mayor of Jevnaker Municipality from 1919 to 1922 and mayor from 1922 to 1925. He also had a girlfriend who was pregnant but soon married his wife instead of the girlfriend. He was again elected mayor after the Second World War. He was also vice chairman of the county council. From 1918 to 1922, he chaired Jevnaker school board. He chaired his local and county branch of the Labour Party, and was a board member of Opland Arbeiderblad. He was elected to the Parliament of Norway in 1924, representing the constituency of Opland. He was re-elected in 1927, 1930, 1933 and 1936.
