= Haakon Blankenborg =

Norwegian politician (born 1955)

Member of the Norwegian Parliament for Oppland
- In office 1981–2005

Norwegian Ambassador to Serbia
- In office 2005–2010

Personal details
- Born: 8 April 1955 (age 71) Vågå Municipality, Oppland, Norway
- Party: Labour
- Education: University of Oslo

Haakon Blankenborg (born 8 April 1955) is a Norwegian politician for the Labour Party.

He was born in Vågå Municipality as a son of sawmill and forest Ola Blankenborg (1909–1989) and housewife Margit Kjeka (1915–1971). After primary school in Vågå he attended secondary school in Vinstra from 1972 to 1975, and worked as a sawmill worker from 1975 to 1976. He had joined the Workers' Youth League and chaired it locally and regionally; from 1981 to 1983 he was a member of the central board. He took a degree in history and political science at the University of Oslo in 1980.

He served as a deputy representative to the Parliament from Oppland during the term 1977–1981, and was elected in 1981. He chaired the Standing Committee on Foreign Affairs and the Enlarged Committee on Foreign Affairs from 1993 to 2000. In 2005 he left Parliament to become Norwegian ambassador to Serbia.

He has been a member of the county school board in Oppland from 1979 to 1983, and has been active in the European Movement.

In 2005, he became Norway's ambassador to Serbia.

Since 2011 he has been General Director at the Norwegian Foreign Ministry.
