= Johan M. Nyland =

Norwegian politician

Johan M. Nyland (6 October 1931 – 13 April 2007) was a Norwegian politician for the Labour Party.

He was elected to the Norwegian Parliament from Oppland in 1985, and was re-elected on two occasions. He had previously served in the position of deputy representative during the terms 1981–1985.

Nyland was born in Østre Toten Municipality and a member of the municipal council of Østre Toten Municipality from 1955 to 1975, serving as deputy mayor during the term 1971–1975. He was also a member of Oppland county council between 1971 and 1987, serving the latter three terms as deputy county mayor.
