= Tove Kari Viken =

Norwegian politician (1942–2016)

Tove Kari Viken (11 August 1942 – 2 December 2016) was a Norwegian politician for the Centre Party.

Born Tove Kari Hanssen in Oppdal Municipality, she was raised on the train station at Kongsvoll, where her father was station master. She married Finn Viken from Oppdal and has two adult children.

She was elected to the Norwegian Parliament from Sør-Trøndelag in 1989, and was re-elected on one occasion. She served in the position of deputy representative during the terms 1981–1985, 1985–1989 and 1997–2001.

Viken was a member of the municipal council for Oppdal Municipality from 1975 to 1983, and later served as deputy mayor in 1987–1989.
