= Marie Brenden =

Norwegian politician (1938–2012)

Marie Brenden (27 February 1938 – 31 July 2012) was a Norwegian educator and politician for the Labour Party.

She was born in Kvam Municipality in Nord-Trøndelag county as a daughter of smallholders Arnfinn Forfang (1913–1994) and Mimmi Haave (1912–1985). She finished secondary education in 1959, and took teacher's college in 1962. She spent most of her career at the primary school Saksheim in Saksumdal in Fåberg Municipality, where she was headmaster from 1979 to 1985.

Brenden was a member of the executive committee of the municipal council of Lillehammer Municipality from 1975 to 1983, and of the executive committee of Oppland county council from 1983 to 1987. She was elected to the Parliament of Norway from Oppland in 1985, and was re-elected on two occasions in 1989 and 1993. She served as a deputy representative during the term 1981–1985. She was a member of the Standing Committee on Social Affairs from 1985 to 1993, except from 1989 to 1990 when she was a member of the Standing Committee on Justice. For her last term she was a member of the Standing Committee on Defence, and was also party whip and parliamentary secretary.

Brenden chaired the small sports club Rinna IL from 1980 to 1982. From 1983 she worked with getting the 1994 Winter Olympics to Lillehammer, and from 1988 to 1993 she was a member of the Lillehammer Olympic Organising Committee.
