= Raufoss Ammunisjonsfabrikker =

Norwegian company

Raufoss Ammunisjonsfabrikker was a Norwegian company based at Raufoss, established in 1896 as Rødfoss Patronfabrik. Initially the company manufactured ammunition, and later also other products, such as aluminium parts to the automotive industry. Until 1948 the company was a subordinate to the Norwegian Ministry of Defence. In the 1990s the automobile division was split off as Raufoss Automotive and eventually taken over by Norsk Hydro. In 1998 the ammunition division was merged with the Swedish company Celsius and the Finnish company Patria, forming the new company Nammo.

== 1956 explosion ==
In the morning of 19 October 1956 an explosion occurred underground in the factory in hall 15. This hall was over 100 metres long where people filled cartridges with gunpowder. At the time of the explosion, there were around 100 people in the hall. Due to the explosion the roof was torn apart, the hall collapsed and people were buried in debris. Due to the explosion five people died and at least 21 people were hospitalized. Four were seriously injured. According to a doctor they were so badly injured that they had difficulties to determine whether they were still alive. The rescue work was seriously hampered because due to the explosion all lights had gone out in the whole underground factory.

The explosion has been listed by Dutch newspaper Het Huisgezin as one of the main international disasters of 1956.
