= Berit Brørby =

Norwegian politician (born 1950)

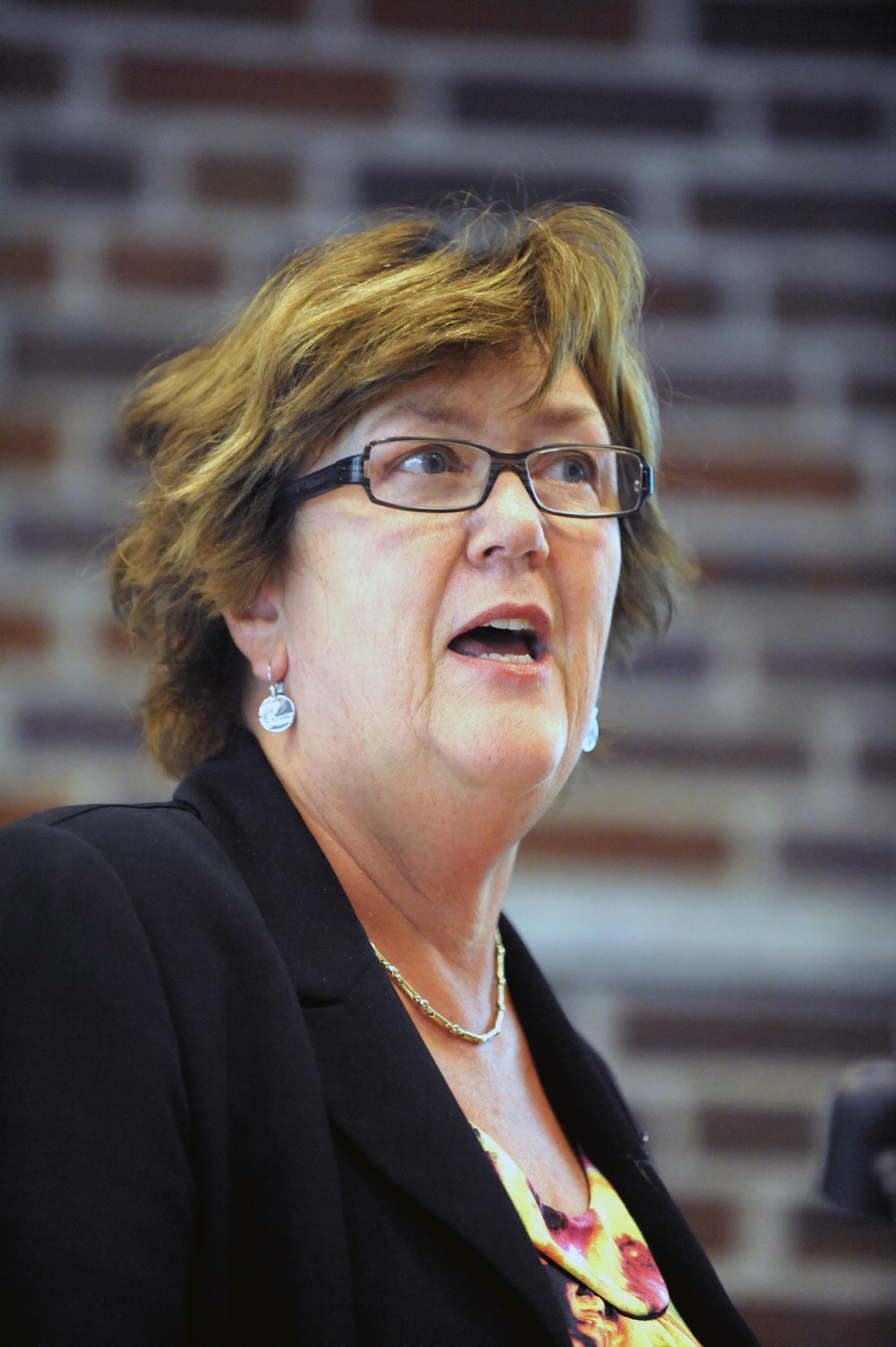

Berit Brørby (born 5 December 1950) is a Norwegian politician for the Labour Party. She was President of the Nordic Council in 1998.

She was elected to the Norwegian Parliament from Oppland in 1985, and has been re-elected on five occasions. Brørby was President of the Odelsting 2005–2009.

Brørby was born in Oslo. At a local level, she was a member of Jevnaker municipality council from 1979 to 1983, and of Oppland county council from 1979 to 1987.
