= Syver Berge =

Norwegian politician (born 1939)

Syver Berge (born 30 July 1939, in Oslo) is a Norwegian politician for the Centre Party.

He was elected to the Norwegian Parliament from Oppland in 1989, and was re-elected on one occasion. He had previously served in the position of deputy representative during the terms 1981–1985.

Berge held various positions on the municipal council of Vågå Municipality from 1967 to 1979 and 1999 to 2003. From 1979 to 1987 he was a member of Oppland county council.
