= Dag C. Weberg =

Norwegian politician

Dag C. Weberg (born 14 September 1937 in Hole) is a Norwegian politician for the Conservative Party.

He was elected to the Norwegian Parliament from Oppland in 1989, and was re-elected on one occasion. He had previously served in the position of deputy representative during the terms 1977–1981, 1981–1985 and 1985–1989.

Weberg was a member of Jevnaker municipality council from 1975 to 1983. From 1983 to 1989 he was a member of Oppland county council.
