= Standing Committee on Education and Research =

The Standing Committee on Education and Research (Norwegian: Utdannings- og forskningskomiteen) is a standing committee of the Parliament of Norway. It is responsible for policies relating to education, research and church affairs. It corresponds to the Ministry of Education and Research and the church affairs section of the Ministry of Culture and Church Affairs. The committee was named the Standing Committee on Education, Research and Church Affairs (Kirke-, utdannings- og forskningskomiteen) between 1993 and 2017. The committee has 15 members and is chaired by Trond Giske of the Labour Party.

== Members 2013–2017 ==
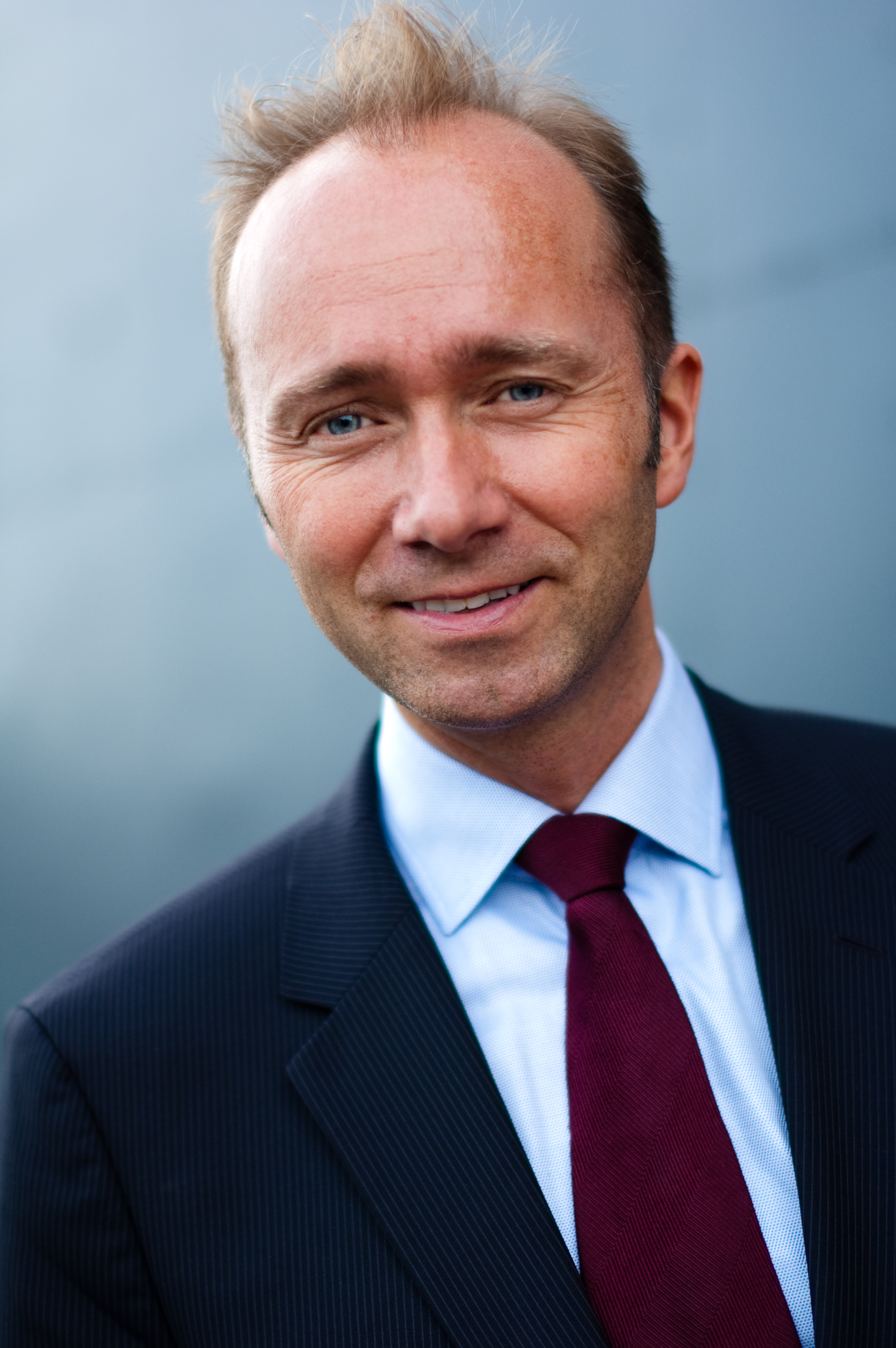
The committee is chaired by Trond Giske

Representative	Party	Position
Trond Giske	Labour	Chair
Iselin Nybø	Liberal	First deputy chair
Anne Tingelstad Wøien	Centre	Second deputy chair
Henrik Asheim	Conservative	
Norunn Tveiten Benestad	Conservative	
Sivert Haugen Bjørnstad	Progress	
Christian Tynning Bjørnø	Labour	
Torgeir Knag Fylkesnes	Socialist Left	
Kent Gudmundsen	Conservative	
Martin Henriksen	Labour	
Tone Merete Sønsterud	Labour	
Bente Thorsen	Progress	
Anders Tyvand	Christian Democratic	
Kristin Vinje	Conservative	
Marianne Aasen	Labour	
