= Nordland (Storting constituency) =

Constituency of the Storting, the national legislature of Norway

- Nordlánnda; Nordlaante; Nordlánda
- Constituency for the Storting
- Location of Nordland within Norway
- County: Nordland
- Population: 243,698 (2025)
- Electorate: 181,846 (2025)
- Area: 38,155 km^{2} (2025)

Current constituency
- Created: 1921
- Seats: List: 8 (2013–present); 9 (2005–2013); 12 (1953–2005); 8 (1921–1953)
- Members of the Storting: List: Bent-Joacim Bentzen (Sp); Hilde Grande (FrP); Geir-Asbjørn Jørgensen (R); Bjørn Larsen (FrP); Øystein Mathisen (Ap); Mona Nilsen (Ap); Dagfinn Henrik Olsen (FrP); Kari Baadstrand Sandnes (Ap); Bård Ludvig Thorheim (H)
- Created from: List: Lofoten; North Helgeland; North Salten; South Helgeland; South Salten; Vesteraalen

Nordland (Lule Sami: Nordlánnda; Southern Sami: Nordlaante; Northern Sami: Nordlánda) is one of the 19 multi-member constituencies of the Storting, the national legislature of Norway. The constituency was established in 1921 following the introduction of proportional representation for elections to the Storting. It is conterminous with the county of Nordland. The constituency currently elects eight of the 169 members of the Storting using the open party-list proportional representation electoral system. At the 2025 parliamentary election it had 181,846 registered electors.

== Electoral system ==
Nordland currently elects eight of the 169 members of the Storting using the open (Note: Although technically elections to the Storting have open lists, they are in effect closed lists as a majority of those voting for a party must make changes to the lists for the changes to take effect, which has never happened since the introduction of proportional representation in 1921, and as result candidates are elected in the order submitted by the party.) party-list proportional representation electoral system. Constituency seats are allocated by the County Electoral Committee using the Modified Sainte-Laguë method. Compensatory seats (seats at large or levelling seats) are calculated based on the national vote and are allocated by the National Electoral Committee using the Modified Sainte-Laguë method at the constituency level (one for each constituency). Only parties that reach the 4% national threshold compete for compensatory seats.

== Election results ==
=== Summary ===
Election	Communists K			Reds R / RV / FMS			Socialist Left SV / SF			Labour Ap			Greens MDG			Centre Sp / Bp / L			Liberals V			Christian Democrats KrF			Conservatives H			Progress FrP / ALP		
Election	Votes	%	Seats	Votes	%	Seats	Votes	%	Seats	Votes	%	Seats	Votes	%	Seats	Votes	%	Seats	Votes	%	Seats	Votes	%	Seats	Votes	%	Seats	Votes	%	Seats
2025				9,099	6.62%	0	7,798	5.67%	0	42,050	30.59%	3	3,962	2.88%	0	11,887	8.65%	1	2,707	1.97%	0	3,271	2.38%	0	15,371	11.18%	1	35,170	25.58%	3
2021	38	0.03%	0	7,273	5.42%	0	9,620	7.17%	1	38,611	28.77%	3	3,138	2.34%	0	28,465	21.21%	2	3,342	2.49%	0	2,637	1.96%	0	20,532	15.30%	1	16,338	12.17%	1
2017	59	0.04%	0	3,905	2.89%	0	9,467	7.00%	0	35,196	26.03%	2	2,932	2.17%	0	25,207	18.64%	2	3,509	2.60%	0	3,284	2.43%	0	27,273	20.17%	2	22,248	16.46%	2
2013	58	0.04%	0	2,164	1.62%	0	6,907	5.18%	0	46,743	35.07%	4	2,653	1.99%	0	9,237	6.93%	0	4,938	3.70%	0	4,886	3.67%	0	28,271	21.21%	2	25,020	18.77%	2
2009	66	0.05%	0	1,829	1.41%	0	10,045	7.74%	1	50,912	39.25%	4	343	0.26%	0	10,736	8.28%	1	2,957	2.28%	0	4,778	3.68%	0	14,905	11.49%	1	31,562	24.33%	2
2005	85	0.06%	0	1,234	0.93%	0	14,881	11.22%	1	48,097	36.27%	4	134	0.10%	0	12,063	9.10%	1	4,318	3.26%	0	5,917	4.46%	0	11,108	8.38%	1	30,017	22.63%	2
2001	125	0.10%	0	1,098	0.85%	0	18,188	14.09%	2	31,283	24.24%	3				11,363	8.80%	1	2,822	2.19%	0	14,316	11.09%	1	16,862	13.06%	2	17,104	13.25%	2
1997	124	0.09%	0	1,824	1.35%	0	9,915	7.33%	1	48,921	36.18%	5	208	0.15%	0	14,752	10.91%	1	4,888	3.62%	0	17,732	13.12%	2	12,375	9.15%	1	15,377	11.37%	1
1993				814	0.63%	0	15,952	12.34%	2	47,402	36.68%	5	110	0.09%	0	30,873	23.89%	3	5,052	3.91%	0	7,714	5.97%	1	14,474	11.20%	1	4,942	3.82%	0
1989				1,623	1.14%	0	21,211	14.87%	2	55,457	38.88%	5				8,997	6.31%	1	3,837	2.69%	0	9,482	6.65%	1	26,715	18.73%	2	14,159	9.93%	1
1985	272	0.19%	0	677	0.46%	0	17,659	12.08%	1	66,987	45.81%	6				8,853	6.05%	1	3,814	2.61%	0	9,094	6.22%	1	35,688	24.41%	3	2,421	1.66%	0
1981	473	0.34%	0	1,073	0.78%	0	10,997	7.98%	1	56,478	41.00%	5				9,762	7.09%	1	5,992	4.35%	0	11,224	8.15%	1	37,676	27.35%	4	3,628	2.63%	0
1977	702	0.56%	0	882	0.70%	0	6,727	5.37%	1	58,178	46.43%	6				12,373	9.87%	1	4,742	3.78%	0	15,144	12.08%	2	23,447	18.71%	2	1,995	1.59%	0
1973				642	0.55%	0	16,532	14.07%	2	42,073	35.81%	5				18,027	15.34%	2	5,588	4.76%	0	15,040	12.80%	2	12,878	10.96%	1	4,830	4.11%	0
1969	1,327	1.11%	0				6,379	5.32%	0	64,033	53.38%	6				15,455	12.88%	2	7,856	6.55%	1	9,346	7.79%	1	15,555	12.97%	2			
1965	1,447	1.26%	0				10,178	8.86%	1	53,185	46.28%	6				12,724	11.07%	1	8,629	7.51%	1	10,553	9.18%	1	18,199	15.84%	2			
1961	2,266	2.24%	0				7,116	7.03%	1	49,675	49.06%	6				10,318	10.19%	1	5,307	5.24%	0	11,659	11.52%	2	14,904	14.72%	2			
1957	3,609	3.70%	0							52,486	53.81%	7				9,587	9.83%	1	6,227	6.38%	1	10,445	10.71%	1	14,612	14.98%	2			
1953	5,527	5.77%	0							52,062	54.39%	7				6,594	6.89%	1	7,405	7.74%	1	10,411	10.88%	1	13,721	14.33%	2			
1949	4,616	5.34%	0							44,603	51.56%	5				5,964	6.89%	0	8,504	9.83%	1	8,362	9.67%	1	12,086	13.97%	1			
1945	7,952	11.44%	1							35,255	50.70%	4				4,125	5.93%	0	9,161	13.17%	1				13,044	18.76%	2			
1936										31,263	40.13%	3				9,012	11.57%	1	12,426	15.95%	1				15,077	19.35%	2			
1933	768	1.21%	0							24,757	39.02%	4				12,101	19.07%	2	11,873	18.71%	1				9,809	15.46%	1			
1930	548	0.91%	0							14,934	24.75%	2				8,994	14.90%	1	15,538	25.75%	2				15,035	24.91%	2			
1927	1,662	3.75%	0							13,718	30.97%	3				6,152	13.89%	1	10,802	24.39%	2				10,157	22.93%	2			
1924	1,467	3.22%	0							7,861	17.27%	1				5,720	12.56%	1	11,469	25.19%	2				17,679	38.83%	4			
1921										10,057	22.51%	2				8,400	18.80%	1	11,099	24.85%	2				12,954	29.00%	3			

(Excludes compensatory seats. Figures in italics represent joint lists.)

=== Detailed ===
==== 2020s ====
===== 2025 =====
Results of the 2025 parliamentary election held on 8 September 2025:

Party		Votes	%	Seats		
Party		Votes	%	Con.	Com.	Tot.
Labour Party	Ap	42,050	30.59%	3	0	3
Progress Party	FrP	35,170	25.58%	3	0	3
Conservative Party	H	15,371	11.18%	1	0	1
Centre Party	Sp	11,887	8.65%	1	0	1
Red Party	R	9,099	6.62%	0	1	1
Socialist Left Party	SV	7,798	5.67%	0	0	0
Green Party	MDG	3,962	2.88%	0	0	0
Christian Democratic Party	KrF	3,271	2.38%	0	0	0
Liberal Party	V	2,707	1.97%	0	0	0
Industry and Business Party	INP	1,399	1.02%	0	0	0
Norway Democrats	ND	1,094	0.80%	0	0	0
Generation Party	GP	1,057	0.77%	0	0	0
Pensioners' Party	PP	1,034	0.75%	0	0	0
Conservative	K	455	0.33%	0	0	0
DNI Party	DNI	397	0.29%	0	0	0
Peace and Justice	FOR	363	0.26%	0	0	0
Welfare and Innovation Party	VIP	253	0.18%	0	0	0
Center Party	PS	116	0.08%	0	0	0
Valid votes		137,483	100.00%	8	1	9
Blank votes		1,487	1.07%			
Rejected votes – other		319	0.23%			
Total polled		139,289	76.60%			
Registered electors		181,846				

The following candidates were elected:

- Constituency seats - Bent-Joacim Bentzen (Sp); Hilde Grande (FrP); Bjørn Larsen (FrP); Øystein Mathisen (Ap); Mona Nilsen (Ap); Dagfinn Henrik Olsen (FrP); Bjørnar Skjæran (Ap); and Bård Ludvig Thorheim (H).
- Compensatory seat - Geir-Asbjørn Jørgensen (R).

===== 2021 =====
Results of the 2021 parliamentary election held on 13 September 2021:

Party		Votes	%	Seats		
Party		Votes	%	Con.	Com.	Tot.
Labour Party	Ap	38,611	28.77%	3	0	3
Centre Party	Sp	28,465	21.21%	2	0	2
Conservative Party	H	20,532	15.30%	1	0	1
Progress Party	FrP	16,338	12.17%	1	0	1
Socialist Left Party	SV	9,620	7.17%	1	0	1
Red Party	R	7,273	5.42%	0	1	1
Liberal Party	V	3,342	2.49%	0	0	0
Green Party	MDG	3,138	2.34%	0	0	0
Christian Democratic Party	KrF	2,637	1.96%	0	0	0
Democrats in Norway		1,807	1.35%	0	0	0
Pensioners' Party	PP	586	0.44%	0	0	0
Industry and Business Party	INP	577	0.43%	0	0	0
Health Party		339	0.25%	0	0	0
The Christians	PDK	314	0.23%	0	0	0
Center Party		211	0.16%	0	0	0
Capitalist Party		175	0.13%	0	0	0
Pirate Party of Norway		126	0.09%	0	0	0
Alliance - Alternative for Norway		99	0.07%	0	0	0
Communist Party of Norway	K	38	0.03%	0	0	0
Valid votes		134,228	100.00%	8	1	9
Blank votes		907	0.67%			
Rejected votes – other		189	0.14%			
Total polled		135,324	74.32%			
Registered electors		182,075				

The following candidates were elected:

- Constituency seats - Mona Fagerås (SV); Øystein Mathisen (Ap); Siv Mossleth (Sp); Mona Nilsen (Ap); Willfred Nordlund (Sp); Dagfinn Henrik Olsen (FrP); Bjørnar Skjæran (Ap); and Bård Ludvig Thorheim (H).
- Compensatory seat - Geir-Asbjørn Jørgensen (R).

==== 2010s ====
===== 2017 =====
Results of the 2017 parliamentary election held on 11 September 2017:

Party		Votes	%	Seats		
Party		Votes	%	Con.	Com.	Tot.
Labour Party	Ap	35,196	26.03%	2	0	2
Conservative Party	H	27,273	20.17%	2	0	2
Centre Party	Sp	25,207	18.64%	2	0	2
Progress Party	FrP	22,248	16.46%	2	0	2
Socialist Left Party	SV	9,467	7.00%	0	1	1
Red Party	R	3,905	2.89%	0	0	0
Liberal Party	V	3,509	2.60%	0	0	0
Christian Democratic Party	KrF	3,284	2.43%	0	0	0
Green Party	MDG	2,932	2.17%	0	0	0
Health Party		615	0.45%	0	0	0
Coastal Party	KP	420	0.31%	0	0	0
The Christians	PDK	288	0.21%	0	0	0
Capitalist Party		269	0.20%	0	0	0
Pirate Party of Norway		210	0.16%	0	0	0
Democrats in Norway		186	0.14%	0	0	0
The Alliance		127	0.09%	0	0	0
Communist Party of Norway	K	59	0.04%	0	0	0
Valid votes		135,195	100.00%	8	1	9
Blank votes		987	0.72%			
Rejected votes – other		293	0.21%			
Total polled		136,475	75.27%			
Registered electors		181,324				

The following candidates were elected:

- Constituency seats - Margunn Ebbesen (H); Jonny Finstad (H); Kjell-Børge Freiberg (FrP); Åsunn Lyngedal (Ap); Siv Mossleth (Sp); Willfred Nordlund (Sp); Eirik Sivertsen (Ap); and Hanne Dyveke Søttar (FrP).
- Compensatory seat - Mona Fagerås (SV).

===== 2013 =====
Results of the 2013 parliamentary election held on 8 and 9 September 2013:

Party		Votes	%	Seats		
Party		Votes	%	Con.	Com.	Tot.
Labour Party	Ap	46,743	35.07%	4	0	4
Conservative Party	H	28,271	21.21%	2	0	2
Progress Party	FrP	25,020	18.77%	2	0	2
Centre Party	Sp	9,237	6.93%	0	1	1
Socialist Left Party	SV	6,907	5.18%	0	0	0
Liberal Party	V	4,938	3.70%	0	0	0
Christian Democratic Party	KrF	4,886	3.67%	0	0	0
Green Party	MDG	2,653	1.99%	0	0	0
Red Party	R	2,164	1.62%	0	0	0
The Christians	PDK	698	0.52%	0	0	0
Pirate Party of Norway		451	0.34%	0	0	0
Coastal Party	KP	424	0.32%	0	0	0
Pensioners' Party	PP	416	0.31%	0	0	0
LoVeSe		268	0.20%	0	0	0
Society Party		92	0.07%	0	0	0
Democrats in Norway		60	0.05%	0	0	0
Communist Party of Norway	K	58	0.04%	0	0	0
Valid votes		133,286	100.00%	8	1	9
Blank votes		672	0.50%			
Rejected votes – other		223	0.17%			
Total polled		134,181	74.77%			
Registered electors		179,464				

The following candidates were elected:

- Constituency seats - Lisbeth Berg-Hansen (Ap); Margunn Ebbesen (H); Jan Arild Ellingsen (FrP); Odd Henriksen (H); Kjell-Idar Juvik (Ap); Anna Ljunggren (Ap); Eirik Sivertsen (Ap); and Kenneth Svendsen (FrP).
- Compensatory seat - Janne Sjelmo Nordås (Sp).

==== 2000s ====
===== 2009 =====
Results of the 2009 parliamentary election held on 13 and 14 September 2009:

Party		Votes	%	Seats		
Party		Votes	%	Con.	Com.	Tot.
Labour Party	Ap	50,912	39.25%	4	0	4
Progress Party	FrP	31,562	24.33%	2	1	3
Conservative Party	H	14,905	11.49%	1	0	1
Centre Party	Sp	10,736	8.28%	1	0	1
Socialist Left Party	SV	10,045	7.74%	1	0	1
Christian Democratic Party	KrF	4,778	3.68%	0	0	0
Liberal Party	V	2,957	2.28%	0	0	0
Red Party	R	1,829	1.41%	0	0	0
Coastal Party	KP	1,139	0.88%	0	0	0
Green Party	MDG	343	0.26%	0	0	0
Christian Unity Party	KSP	225	0.17%	0	0	0
Democrats in Norway		74	0.06%	0	0	0
Society Party		68	0.05%	0	0	0
Communist Party of Norway	K	66	0.05%	0	0	0
Non-Partisan Deputies	TVF	64	0.05%	0	0	0
Valid votes		129,703	100.00%	9	1	10
Blank votes		591	0.45%			
Rejected votes – other		194	0.15%			
Total polled		130,488	73.39%			
Registered electors		177,796				

The following candidates were elected:

- Constituency seats - Jan Arild Ellingsen (FrP); Geir-Ketil Hansen (SV); Lillian Hansen (Ap); Ivar Kristiansen (H); Anna Ljunggren (Ap); Janne Sjelmo Nordås (Sp); Eirik Sivertsen (Ap); Tor-Arne Strøm (Ap); and Kenneth Svendsen (FrP).
- Compensatory seat - Torgeir Trældal (FrP).

===== 2005 =====
Results of the 2005 parliamentary election held on 11 and 12 September 2005:

Party		Votes	%	Seats		
Party		Votes	%	Con.	Com.	Tot.
Labour Party	Ap	48,097	36.27%	4	0	4
Progress Party	FrP	30,017	22.63%	2	0	2
Socialist Left Party	SV	14,881	11.22%	1	0	1
Centre Party	Sp	12,063	9.10%	1	0	1
Conservative Party	H	11,108	8.38%	1	0	1
Christian Democratic Party	KrF	5,917	4.46%	0	1	1
Liberal Party	V	4,318	3.26%	0	0	0
Coastal Party	KP	4,155	3.13%	0	0	0
Red Electoral Alliance	RV	1,234	0.93%	0	0	0
Pensioners' Party	PP	306	0.23%	0	0	0
Christian Unity Party	KSP	180	0.14%	0	0	0
Green Party	MDG	134	0.10%	0	0	0
Communist Party of Norway	K	85	0.06%	0	0	0
Democrats		79	0.06%	0	0	0
Society Party		44	0.03%	0	0	0
Valid votes		132,618	100.00%	9	1	10
Blank votes		477	0.36%			
Rejected votes – other		91	0.07%			
Total polled		133,186	74.84%			
Registered electors		177,966				

The following candidates were elected:

- Constituency seats - Jan Arild Ellingsen (FrP); Åsa Elvik (SV); Ivar Kristiansen (H); Anna Ljunggren (Ap); Torny Pedersen (Ap); Alf Ivar Samuelsen (Sp); Hill-Marta Solberg (Ap); Tor-Arne Strøm (Ap); and Kenneth Svendsen (FrP).
- Compensatory seat - Jan Sahl (KrF).

===== 2001 =====
Results of the 2001 parliamentary election held on 9 and 10 September 2001:

Party		Votes	%	Seats		
Party		Votes	%	Con.	Com.	Tot.
Labour Party	Ap	31,283	24.24%	3	0	3
Socialist Left Party	SV	18,188	14.09%	2	0	2
Progress Party	FrP	17,104	13.25%	2	0	2
Conservative Party	H	16,862	13.06%	2	0	2
Christian Democratic Party	KrF	14,316	11.09%	1	0	1
Coastal Party	KP	14,042	10.88%	1	0	1
Centre Party	Sp	11,363	8.80%	1	0	1
Liberal Party	V	2,822	2.19%	0	0	0
Red Electoral Alliance	RV	1,098	0.85%	0	0	0
The Political Party	DPP	682	0.53%	0	0	0
Pensioners' Party	PP	482	0.37%	0	0	0
Christian Unity Party	KSP	406	0.31%	0	0	0
Communist Party of Norway	K	125	0.10%	0	0	0
Fatherland Party	FLP	112	0.09%	0	0	0
County Lists		111	0.09%	0	0	0
Norwegian People's Party	NFP	52	0.04%	0	0	0
Liberal People's Party	DLF	32	0.02%	0	0	0
Valid votes		129,080	100.00%	12	0	12
Rejected votes		412	0.32%			
Total polled		129,492	72.35%			
Registered electors		178,977				

The following candidates were elected:

- Constituency seats - Steinar Bastesen (KP); Jan Arild Ellingsen (FrP); Åsa Elvik (SV); Odd Roger Enoksen (Sp); Geir-Ketil Hansen (SV); Ivar Kristiansen (H); Torny Pedersen (Ap); Jan Sahl (KrF); Hill-Marta Solberg (Ap); Tor-Arne Strøm (Ap); Kenneth Svendsen (FrP); and Søren Fredrik Voie (H).

==== 1990s ====
===== 1997 =====
Results of the 1997 parliamentary election held on 15 September 1997:

Party		Votes	%	Seats		
Party		Votes	%	Con.	Com.	Tot.
Labour Party	Ap	48,921	36.18%	5	0	5
Christian Democratic Party	KrF	17,732	13.12%	2	0	2
Progress Party	FrP	15,377	11.37%	1	0	1
Centre Party	Sp	14,752	10.91%	1	0	1
Conservative Party	H	12,375	9.15%	1	0	1
Socialist Left Party	SV	9,915	7.33%	1	0	1
Non-Partisan Deputies	TVF	8,357	6.18%	1	0	1
Liberal Party	V	4,888	3.62%	0	0	0
Red Electoral Alliance	RV	1,824	1.35%	0	0	0
Pensioners' Party	PP	431	0.32%	0	0	0
Green Party	MDG	208	0.15%	0	0	0
Fatherland Party	FLP	153	0.11%	0	0	0
Communist Party of Norway	K	124	0.09%	0	0	0
Society Party		89	0.07%	0	0	0
Natural Law Party		52	0.04%	0	0	0
Valid votes		135,198	100.00%	12	0	12
Rejected votes		300	0.22%			
Total polled		135,498	74.29%			
Registered electors		182,393				

The following candidates were elected:

- Constituency seats - Steinar Bastesen (TVF); Gunnar Breimo (Ap); Odd Roger Enoksen (Sp); Odd Eriksen (Ap); Ivar Kristiansen (H); Inge Myrvoll (SV); Tomas Norvoll (Ap): Kari Økland (KrF); Torny Pedersen (Ap); Jan Sahl (KrF); Hill-Marta Solberg (Ap); and Kenneth Svendsen (FrP).

===== 1993 =====
Results of the 1993 parliamentary election held on 12 and 13 September 1993:

Party		Votes	%	Seats		
Party		Votes	%	Con.	Com.	Tot.
Labour Party	Ap	47,402	36.68%	5	0	5
Centre Party	Sp	30,873	23.89%	3	0	3
Socialist Left Party	SV	15,952	12.34%	2	0	2
Conservative Party	H	14,474	11.20%	1	0	1
Christian Democratic Party	KrF	7,714	5.97%	1	0	1
Liberal Party	V	5,052	3.91%	0	0	0
Progress Party	FrP	4,942	3.82%	0	0	0
Red Electoral Alliance	RV	814	0.63%	0	0	0
Pensioners' Party	PP	812	0.63%	0	0	0
Stop Immigration	SI	513	0.40%	0	0	0
New Future Coalition Party	SNF	300	0.23%	0	0	0
Fatherland Party	FLP	282	0.22%	0	0	0
Green Party	MDG	110	0.09%	0	0	0
Valid votes		129,240	100.00%	12	0	12
Rejected votes		300	0.23%			
Total polled		129,540	70.23%			
Registered electors		184,446				

The following candidates were elected:

- Constituency seats - Peter Angelsen (Sp); Gunnar Breimo (Ap); Odd Roger Enoksen (Sp); Odd Eriksen (Ap); Dag Jostein Fjærvoll (KrF); Lisbeth Holand (SV); Ragna Berget Jørgensen (Ap); Inga Kvalbukt (Sp); Inge Myrvoll (SV); Tomas Norvoll (Ap): Hill-Marta Solberg (Ap); and Petter Thomassen (H).

==== 1980s ====
===== 1989 =====
Results of the 1989 parliamentary election held on 10 and 11 September 1989:

Party		Votes	%	Seats		
Party		Votes	%	Con.	Com.	Tot.
Labour Party	Ap	55,457	38.88%	5	0	5
Conservative Party	H	26,715	18.73%	2	0	2
Socialist Left Party	SV	21,211	14.87%	2	0	2
Progress Party	FrP	14,159	9.93%	1	0	1
Christian Democratic Party	KrF	9,482	6.65%	1	0	1
Centre Party	Sp	8,997	6.31%	1	0	1
Liberal Party	V	3,837	2.69%	0	0	0
County Lists for Environment and Solidarity	FMS	1,623	1.14%	0	0	0
Pensioners' Party	PP	633	0.44%	0	0	0
Stop Immigration	SI	513	0.36%	0	0	0
Valid votes		142,627	100.00%	12	0	12
Rejected votes		296	0.21%			
Total polled		142,923	78.21%			
Registered electors		182,754				

The following candidates were elected:

- Constituency seats - Peter Angelsen (Sp); Rolf Bendiksen (Ap); Dag Jostein Fjærvoll (KrF); Åshild Hauan (Ap); Lisbeth Holand (SV); Harry Jensen (FrP); Ragna Berget Jørgensen (Ap); Thea Knutzen (H); Bjarne Mørk Eidem (Ap); Inge Myrvoll (SV); Inger Pedersen (Ap); and Petter Thomassen (H).

===== 1985 =====
Results of the 1985 parliamentary election held on 8 and 9 September 1985:

Party		Votes	%	Seats
Labour Party	Ap	66,987	45.81%	6
Conservative Party	H	35,688	24.41%	3
Socialist Left Party	SV	17,659	12.08%	1
Christian Democratic Party	KrF	9,094	6.22%	1
Centre Party	Sp	8,853	6.05%	1
Liberal Party	V	3,814	2.61%	0
Progress Party	FrP	2,421	1.66%	0
Red Electoral Alliance	RV	677	0.46%	0
Pensioners' Party	PP	563	0.39%	0
Communist Party of Norway	K	272	0.19%	0
Liberal People's Party	DLF	202	0.14%	0
Valid votes		146,230	100.00%	12
Rejected votes		136	0.09%	
Total polled		146,366	80.66%	
Registered electors		181,471		

The following candidates were elected: Peter Angelsen (Sp); Dag Jostein Fjærvoll (KrF); Åshild Hauan (Ap); Jan-Olav Ingvaldsen (Ap); Ragna Berget Jørgensen (Ap); Finn Knutsen (Ap); Thea Knutzen (H); Hanna Kvanmo (SV); Bjarne Mørk Eidem (Ap); Inger Pedersen (Ap); Hans Svendsgård (H); and Petter Thomassen (H).

===== 1981 =====
Results of the 1981 parliamentary election held on 13 and 14 September 1981:

Party		Votes	%	Seats
Labour Party	Ap	56,478	41.00%	5
Conservative Party	H	37,676	27.35%	4
Christian Democratic Party	KrF	11,224	8.15%	1
Socialist Left Party	SV	10,997	7.98%	1
Centre Party	Sp	9,762	7.09%	1
Liberal Party	V	5,992	4.35%	0
Progress Party	FrP	3,628	2.63%	0
Red Electoral Alliance	RV	1,073	0.78%	0
Communist Party of Norway	K	473	0.34%	0
Liberal People's Party	DLF	289	0.21%	0
Plebiscite Party		104	0.08%	0
Free Elected Representatives		54	0.04%	0
Valid votes		137,750	100.00%	12
Rejected votes		158	0.11%	
Total polled		137,908	77.76%	
Registered electors		177,359		

The following candidates were elected: Peter Angelsen (Sp); Eivind Bolle (Ap); Harry Danielsen (H); Åshild Hauan (Ap); Karl Ingebrigtsen (Ap); Ragna Berget Jørgensen (Ap); Elsa Kobberstad (H); Hanna Kvanmo (SV); Bjarne Mørk Eidem (Ap); Hans Svendsgård (H); Petter Thomassen (H); and Odd With (KrF).

==== 1970s ====
===== 1977 =====
Results of the 1977 parliamentary election held on 11 and 12 September 1977:

Party		Votes	%	Seats
Labour Party	Ap	58,178	46.43%	6
Conservative Party	H	23,447	18.71%	2
Christian Democratic Party	KrF	15,144	12.08%	2
Centre Party	Sp	12,373	9.87%	1
Socialist Left Party	SV	6,727	5.37%	1
Liberal Party	V	4,742	3.78%	0
Progress Party	FrP	1,995	1.59%	0
Red Electoral Alliance	RV	882	0.70%	0
New People's Party	DNF	850	0.68%	0
Communist Party of Norway	K	702	0.56%	0
Single Person's Party		126	0.10%	0
Norwegian Democratic Party		76	0.06%	0
Free Elected Representatives		74	0.06%	0
Valid votes		125,316	100.00%	12
Rejected votes		172	0.14%	
Total polled		125,488	76.73%	
Registered electors		163,535		

The following candidates were elected: Eivind Bolle (Ap); Gudmund Grytøyr (Ap); Rolf Hellem (Ap); Per Karstensen (Ap); Karl Sverre Klevstad (KrF); Hanna Kvanmo (SV); Håkon Kyllingmark (H); Bjarne Mørk Eidem (Ap); Kåre Rønning (Sp); Anne-Lise Steinbach (Ap); Petter Thomassen (H); and Odd With (KrF).

===== 1973 =====
Results of the 1973 parliamentary election held on 9 and 10 September 1973:

Party		Votes	%	Seats
Labour Party	Ap	42,073	35.81%	5
Centre Party	Sp	18,027	15.34%	2
Socialist Electoral League	SV	16,532	14.07%	2
Christian Democratic Party	KrF	15,040	12.80%	2
Conservative Party	H	12,878	10.96%	1
Liberal Party	V	5,588	4.76%	0
Anders Lange's Party	ALP	4,830	4.11%	0
New People's Party	DNF	1,329	1.13%	0
Red Electoral Alliance	RV	642	0.55%	0
Norwegian Democratic Party		210	0.18%	0
Women's Free Elected Representatives		170	0.14%	0
Single Person's Party		165	0.14%	0
Other		2	0.00%	0
Valid votes		117,486	100.00%	12
Rejected votes		221	0.19%	
Total polled		117,707	73.73%	
Registered electors		159,648		

The following candidates were elected: Eivind Bolle (Ap); Odin Hansen (SV); Rolf Hellem (Ap); Per Karstensen (Ap); Karl Sverre Klevstad (KrF); Hanna Kvanmo (SV); Håkon Kyllingmark (H); Bjarne Mørk Eidem (Ap); Kåre Rønning (Sp); Anne-Lise Steinbach (Ap); Odd With (KrF); and Willy Arne Wold (Sp).

==== 1960s ====
===== 1969 =====
Results of the 1969 parliamentary election held on 7 and 8 September 1969:

Party		Votes	%	Seats
Labour Party	Ap	64,033	53.38%	6
Conservative Party	H	15,555	12.97%	2
Centre Party	Sp	15,455	12.88%	2
Christian Democratic Party	KrF	9,346	7.79%	1
Liberal Party	V	7,856	6.55%	1
Socialist People's Party	SF	6,379	5.32%	0
Communist Party of Norway	K	1,327	1.11%	0
Valid votes		119,951	100.00%	12
Rejected votes		276	0.23%	
Total polled		120,227	76.79%	
Registered electors		156,558		

The following candidates were elected: Bodil Aakre (H); Magnus Andersen (Ap); Erling Engan (Sp); Edmund Fjærvoll (KrF); Rolf Hellem (Ap); Per Karstensen (Ap); Johan Kleppe (V); Håkon Kyllingmark (H); Bjarne Mørk Eidem (Ap); Margith Johanne Munkebye (Ap); Walter Kåre Tjønndal (Ap); and Willy Arne Wold (Sp).

===== 1965 =====
Results of the 1965 parliamentary election held on 12 and 13 September 1965:

Party			Votes	%	Seats
style="color:inherit;background:#E11926	Labour Party	Ap	53,185	46.28%	6
style="color:inherit;background:#87add7	Conservative Party	H	18,199	15.84%	2
style="color:inherit;background:#00843D	Centre Party	Sp	12,724	11.07%	1
style="color:inherit;background:#FDED34	Christian Democratic Party	KrF	10,553	9.18%	1
style="color:inherit;background:#dc0028	Socialist People's Party	SF	10,178	8.86%	1
style="color:inherit;background:#006666	Liberal Party	V	8,629	7.51%	1
style="color:inherit;background:#990000	Communist Party of Norway	K	1,447	1.26%	0
Valid votes			114,915	100.00%	12
Rejected votes			669	0.58%	
Total polled			115,584	77.35%	
Registered electors			149,427		

The following candidates were elected: Magnus Andersen (Ap); Hans Berg (KrF); Halvor Bjellaanes (V); Erling Engan (Sp); Jonas Enge (Ap); Sigurd Lund Hamran (Ap); Rolf Hellem (Ap); Asbjørn Holm (SF); Per Karstensen (Ap); Håkon Kyllingmark (H); Margith Johanne Munkebye (Ap); and Harald Warholm (H).

===== 1961 =====
Results of the 1961 parliamentary election held on 11 September 1961:

Party		Votes	%	Seats
Labour Party	Ap	49,675	49.06%	6
Conservative Party	H	14,904	14.72%	2
Christian Democratic Party	KrF	11,659	11.52%	2
Centre Party	Sp	10,318	10.19%	1
Socialist People's Party	SF	7,116	7.03%	1
Liberal Party	V	5,307	5.24%	0
Communist Party of Norway	K	2,266	2.24%	0
Wild Votes		1	0.00%	0
Valid votes		101,246	100.00%	12
Rejected votes		773	0.76%	
Total polled		102,019	70.34%	
Registered electors		145,038		

The following candidates were elected: Hans Berg (KrF), 11,646 votes; Parelius Hjalmar Bang Berntsen (Ap), 49,670 votes; Erling Engan (Sp), 10,315 votes; Jonas Enge (Ap), 49,667 votes; Edmund Fjærvoll (KrF), 11,657 votes; Sigurd Lund Hamran (Ap), 49,666 votes; Asbjørn Holm (SF), 7,117 votes; Håkon Kyllingmark (H), 14,899 votes; Margith Johanne Munkebye (Ap), 49,664 votes; Petter Carl Reinsnes (Ap), 49,671 votes; Kolbjørn Varmann (Ap), 49,671 votes; and Harald Warholm (H), 14,893 votes.

==== 1950s ====
===== 1957 =====
Results of the 1957 parliamentary election held on 7 October 1957:

Party		Votes	%	Seats
Labour Party	Ap	52,486	53.81%	7
Conservative Party	H	14,612	14.98%	2
Christian Democratic Party	KrF	10,445	10.71%	1
Farmers' Party	Bp	9,587	9.83%	1
Liberal Party	V	6,227	6.38%	1
Communist Party of Norway	K	3,609	3.70%	0
Norwegian Social Democratic Party		565	0.58%	0
Wild Votes		2	0.00%	0
Valid votes		97,533	100.00%	12
Rejected votes		635	0.65%	
Total polled		98,168	68.26%	
Registered electors		143,823		

The following candidates were elected: Hans Berg (KrF); Parelius Hjalmar Bang Berntsen (Ap); Reidar Carlsen (Ap); Erling Engan (Bp); Jonas Enge (Ap); Sigurd Lund Hamran (Ap); Håkon Kyllingmark (H); Margith Johanne Munkebye (Ap); Petter Carl Reinsnes (Ap); Kolbjørn Varmann (Ap); Erling Johan Vindenes (V); and Harald Warholm (H).

===== 1953 =====
Results of the 1953 parliamentary election held on 12 October 1953:

Party		Votes	%	Seats
Labour Party	Ap	52,062	54.39%	7
Conservative Party	H	13,721	14.33%	2
Christian Democratic Party	KrF	10,411	10.88%	1
Liberal Party	V	7,405	7.74%	1
Farmers' Party	Bp	6,594	6.89%	1
Communist Party of Norway	K	5,527	5.77%	0
Valid votes		95,720	100.00%	12
Rejected votes		882	0.91%	
Total polled		96,602	68.27%	
Registered electors		141,500		

The following candidates were elected: Hans Berg (KrF); Parelius Hjalmar Bang Berntsen (Ap); Reidar Carlsen (Ap); Erling Engan (Bp); Jonas Enge (Ap); Sigurd Lund Hamran (Ap);Håkon Kyllingmark (H); Alfred Sigurd Nilsen (Ap); Lauritz Johan Riise (H); Jens Olai Steffensen (Ap); Kolbjørn Varmann (Ap); and Erling Johan Vindenes (V).

==== 1940s ====
===== 1949 =====
Results of the 1949 parliamentary election held on 10 October 1949:

Party		Votes	%	Seats
Labour Party	Ap	44,603	51.56%	5
Civic Assembly Party (Conservative Party)	BS	12,086	13.97%	1
Liberal Party	V	8,504	9.83%	1
Christian Democratic Party	KrF	8,362	9.67%	1
Farmers' Party	Bp	5,964	6.89%	0
Communist Party of Norway	K	4,616	5.34%	0
Society Party	Samfp	2,368	2.74%	0
Wild Votes		1	0.00%	0
Valid votes		86,504	100.00%	8
Rejected votes		1,183	1.35%	
Total polled		87,687	69.85%	
Registered electors		125,543		

The following candidates were elected: Parelius Hjalmar Bang Berntsen (Ap); Reidar Carlsen (Ap); Jonas Enge (Ap); Kristoffer Skåne Grytnes (KrF); Arnold Carl Johansen (BS); Jens Olai Steffensen (Ap); Kolbjørn Varmann (Ap); and Erling Johan Vindenes (V).

===== 1945 =====
Results of the 1945 parliamentary election held on 8 October 1945:

Party		Party			List Alliance		
Party		Votes	%	Seats	Votes	%	Seats
Labour Party	Ap	35,255	50.70%	5	35,255	50.70%	4
Civic Assembly Party (Conservative Party)	BS	13,044	18.76%	1	17,167	24.69%	2
Farmers' Party	Bp	4,125	5.93%	0	17,167	24.69%	2
Liberal Party	V	9,161	13.17%	1	9,161	13.17%	1
Communist Party of Norway	K	7,952	11.44%	1	7,952	11.44%	1
Valid votes		69,537	100.00%	8	69,535	100.00%	8
Rejected votes		829	1.18%				
Total polled		70,366	61.33%				
Registered electors		114,739					

As the list alliance was entitled to more seats contesting as an alliance than it was contesting as individual parties, the distribution of seats was as list alliance votes. The BS-Bp list alliance's additional seat was allocated to the Civic Assembly Party.

The following candidates were elected: Parelius Hjalmar Bang Berntsen (Ap); Reidar Carlsen (Ap); Anton Djupvik (V); Hårek Ludvig Hansen (BS); Kristian Moljord (K); Jens Olai Steffensen (Ap); Cato Andreas Sverdrup (BS); and Haakon Olsen Wika (Ap).

==== 1930s ====
===== 1936 =====
Results of the 1936 parliamentary election held on 19 October 1936:

Party		Party			List Alliance		
Party		Votes	%	Seats	Votes	%	Seats
Labour Party	Ap	31,263	40.13%	4	31,263	40.14%	3
Civic Assembly Party (Conservative Party)	BS	15,077	19.35%	1	25,949	33.31%	3
Farmers' Party	Bp	9,012	11.57%	1	25,949	33.31%	3
Free-minded People's Party and Fatherland League	FF-Fl	1,868	2.40%	0	25,949	33.31%	3
Liberal Party	V	12,426	15.95%	1	12,426	15.95%	1
Society Party	Samfp	7,865	10.10%	1	7,865	10.10%	1
Nasjonal Samling	NS	385	0.49%	0	385	0.49%	0
Wild Votes		4	0.01%	0	4	0.01%	0
Valid votes		77,900	100.00%	8	77,892	100.00%	8
Rejected votes		627	0.80%				
Total polled		78,527	79.63%				
Registered electors		98,615					

As the list alliance was entitled to more seats contesting as an alliance than it was contesting as individual parties, the distribution of seats was as list alliance votes. The BS-Bp-FF-Fl list alliance's additional seat was allocated to the Civic Assembly Party.

The following candidates were elected: Johan Jæger Caroliussen (V); Sigurd H. Jacobsen (Samfp); Arnt Ove Krane (BS); Nils Mjaavatn (Bp); Andreas Moan (Ap); Jens Olai Steffensen (Ap); Cato Andreas Sverdrup (BS); and Haakon Olsen Wika (Ap).

===== 1933 =====
Results of the 1933 parliamentary election held on 16 October 1933:

Party		Party			List Alliance		
Party		Votes	%	Seats	Votes	%	Seats
Labour Party	Ap	24,757	39.02%	4	24,757	39.03%	4
Farmers' Party	Bp	12,101	19.07%	2	23,961	37.78%	3
Civic Assembly Party (Conservative Party)	BS	9,809	15.46%	1	23,961	37.78%	3
Free-minded People's Party	FF	2,082	3.28%	0	23,961	37.78%	3
Liberal Party	V	11,873	18.71%	1	11,873	18.72%	1
Society Party	Samfp	2,065	3.25%	0	2,065	3.26%	0
Communist Party of Norway	K	768	1.21%	0	768	1.21%	0
Valid votes		63,455	100.00%	8	63,424	100.00%	8
Rejected votes		350	0.55%				
Total polled		63,805	68.48%				
Registered electors		93,167					

As the list alliance was not entitled to more seats contesting as an alliance than it was contesting as individual parties, the distribution of seats was as party votes.

The following candidates were elected: Carl Bonnevie (Ap); Johan Jæger Caroliussen (V); Cornelius Enge (Ap); Haavard Nikolai Hanssen (Bp); Nils Mjaavatn (Bp); Andreas Moan (Ap); Eilert Præsteng (BS); and Jens Olai Steffensen (Ap).

===== 1930 =====
Results of the 1930 parliamentary election held on 20 October 1930:

Party		Party			List Alliance		
Party		Votes	%	Seats	Votes	%	Seats
Liberal Party	V	15,538	25.75%	2	15,538	25.75%	2
Civic Assembly Party (Conservative Party)	BS	15,035	24.91%	2	29,319	48.59%	4
Farmers' Party	Bp	8,994	14.90%	1	29,319	48.59%	4
Free-minded Liberal Party	FV	5,300	8.78%	1	29,319	48.59%	4
Labour Party	Ap	14,934	24.75%	2	14,934	24.75%	2
Communist Party of Norway	K	548	0.91%	0	548	0.91%	0
Wild Votes		1	0.00%	0	1	0.00%	0
Valid votes		60,350	100.00%	8	60,340	100.00%	8
Rejected votes		389	0.64%				
Total polled		60,739	69.54%				
Registered electors		87,343					

As the list alliance was not entitled to more seats contesting as an alliance than it was contesting as individual parties, the distribution of seats was as party votes.

The following candidates were elected: Johan Jæger Caroliussen (V); Anton Djupvik (V); Cornelius Enge (Ap); Arnt Gurnerius Holm (FV); Andreas Holdø (BS); Nils Mjaavatn (Bp); Andreas Moan (Ap); and Eilert Præsteng (BS).

==== 1920s ====
===== 1927 =====
Results of the 1927 parliamentary election held on 17 October 1927:

Party		Votes	%	Seats
Labour Party	Ap	13,718	30.97%	3
Liberal Party	V	10,802	24.39%	2
Civic Assembly Party (Conservative Party)	BS	10,157	22.93%	2
Farmers' Party	Bp	6,152	13.89%	1
Free-minded Liberal Party	FV	1,806	4.08%	0
Communist Party of Norway	K	1,662	3.75%	0
Valid votes		44,297	100.00%	8
Rejected votes		664	1.48%	
Total polled		44,961	53.73%	
Registered electors		83,678		

The following candidates were elected: Johan Jæger Caroliussen (V); Anton Djupvik (V); Cornelius Enge (Ap); Jakob Karsten Olsen Gavlen (Ap); Nils Mjaavatn (Bp); Andreas Moan (Ap); Johan E. Paulsen (BS); and Eilert Præsteng (BS).

===== 1924 =====
Results of the 1924 parliamentary election held on 21 October 1924:

Party		Votes	%	Seats
Conservative Party and Free-minded Liberal Party	H-FV	17,679	38.83%	4
Liberal Party	V	11,469	25.19%	2
Labour Party	Ap	7,861	17.27%	1
Farmers' Party	Bp	5,720	12.56%	1
Communist Party of Norway	K	1,467	3.22%	0
Social Democratic Labour Party of Norway	S	1,213	2.66%	0
Independent National People's Electoral List	UNFL	120	0.26%	0
Wild Votes		2	0.00%	0
Valid votes		45,531	100.00%	8
Rejected votes		824	1.78%	
Total polled		46,355	58.19%	
Registered electors		79,662		

The following candidates were elected: Johan Jæger Caroliussen (V); Anton Djupvik (V); Andreas Holdø (H-FV); Andreas Moan (Ap); Johan E. Paulsen (H-FV); Eilert Præsteng (H-FV); Jens Steiro (Bp); and Ingvald Ytterstad (H-FV).

===== 1921 =====
Results of the 1921 parliamentary election held on 24 October 1921:

Party		Votes	%	Seats
Conservative Party and Free-minded Liberal Party	H-FV	12,954	29.00%	3
Liberal Party	V	11,099	24.85%	2
Labour Party	Ap	10,057	22.51%	2
Norwegian Farmers' Association	L	8,400	18.80%	1
Social Democratic Labour Party of Norway	S	1,229	2.75%	0
Radical People's Party	RF	877	1.96%	0
Wild Votes		53	0.12%	0
Valid votes		44,669	100.00%	8
Rejected votes		1,243	2.71%	
Total polled		45,912	59.23%	
Registered electors		77,512		

The following candidates were elected: Peter Olsen Bolstad (Ap); Johan Jæger Caroliussen (V); Nils M. Kulstad (V); Andreas Moan (Ap); Sven Martin Nøkleby (H-FV); Eilert Præsteng (H-FV); Mathias Skaar (H-FV); and Jens Steiro (L).
