= Fjærvoll =

Fjærvoll is a surname. Notable people with the surname include:

- Dag Jostein Fjærvoll (1947–2021), Norwegian politician, son of Edmund
- Edmund Fjærvoll (1910–1975), Norwegian politician
- Ottar Fjærvoll (1914–1995), Norwegian politician
