= Bent-Joacim Bentzen =

Norwegian politician (born 1991)

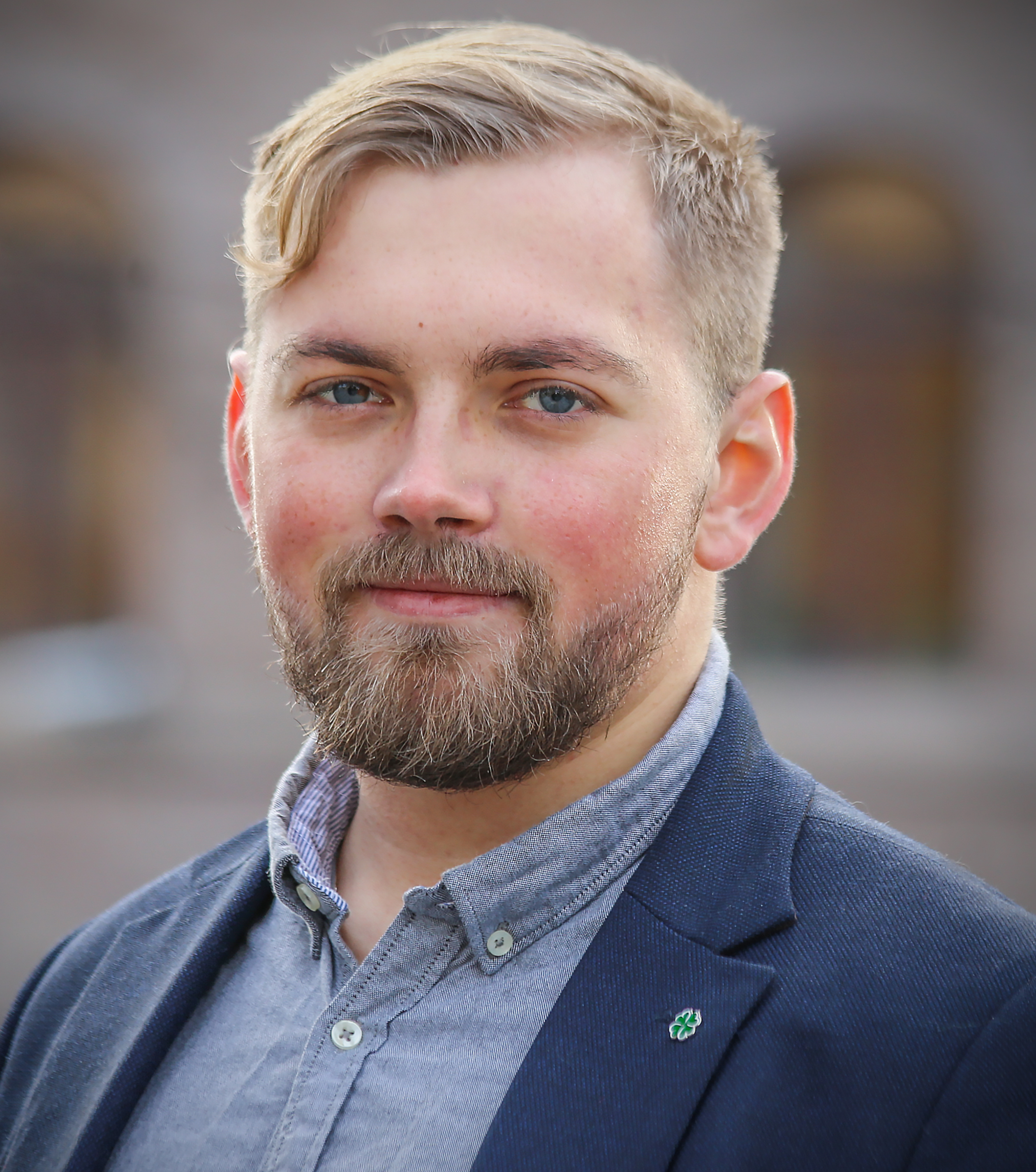
- Bentzen in 2017

Member of the Storting
- Incumbent
- Assumed office 1 October 2025
- Constituency: Nordland

Nordland County Commissioner for Transport
- In office 18 September 2019 – 22 October 2021
- Cabinet Chair: Tomas Norvoll
- Preceded by: Svein Eggesvik
- Succeeded by: Monika Sande

Personal details
- Born: 3 April 1991 (age 35)
- Party: Centre

Military service
- Allegiance: Norway
- Branch/service: Norwegian Army; Home Guard
- Years of service: 2010–2019
- Rank: Lieutenant

Bent-Joacim Bentzen (born 3 April 1991) is a Norwegian politician who has served as a member of the Storting for Nordland since 2025. A member of the Centre Party, he previously served as a deputy member of the Storting from 2021 to 2025. Concurrently, he also served as a state secretary, first at the Ministry of Defence until 2023 and then at the Ministry of Transport until 2025.

== Political career ==
=== Local politics ===
Bentzen was appointed Nordland county commissioner for transport in Tomas Norvoll's county cabinet following the 2019 local elections, succeeding fellow party member Svein Eggesvik, who had become commissioner for economy. He resigned in October 2021 upon being appointed state secretary in Jonas Gahr Støre's government. Eggesvik succeeded him in an acting capacity until Monika Sande was appointed his permanent successor on 6 December.

=== State Secretary ===
Bentzen was appointed state secretary at the Ministry of Defence on 22 October 2021. He was retained by Bjørn Arild Gram upon him taking over as minister of defence from Odd Roger Enoksen in 2022. In January 2023, he was moved to the Ministry of Transport. He left his position upon his party withdrawing from government in January 2025, during which he was highly critical of the Labour Party, accusing them of putting EU interests over Norwegian interests and labelling them as "arrogant".

=== Parliament ===
Bentzen was first elected to the Storting at the 2021 election as a deputy member for Nordland, a seat he held until 2025. He was elected as a regular member from the same constituency at the 2025 election.

Following the 2025 election, Bentzen became the Centre Party's spokesperson on justice.

== Military career ==
Bentzen served in the Norwegian Armed Forces between 2010 and 2019, serving in the Norwegian Army and the Home Guard. During this time, he completed Officers' School and served in the Signal Battalion. He also held the rank of Fähnrich and Lieutenant in the task forces Anklet and Heron respectively.
