= Standing Committee on Justice =

Standing committee of the Parliament of Norway

The Standing Committee on Justice (Norwegian: Justiskomiteen) is a standing committee of the Parliament of Norway. It is responsible for policies relating to judicial system, the probation service, the police, persons performing civilian national service, other judicial issues, ex gratia payments, general legislation relating to public administration, the penal code, civil and criminal procedural legislation and general civil legislation.. It corresponds to the Ministry of Justice. The committee has 12 members and is chaired by Hadia Tajik of the Labour Party.

== Members 2013–17 ==
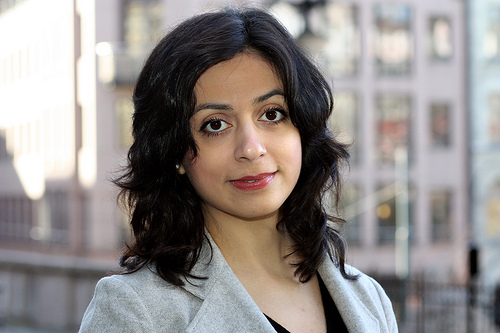
The committee is chaired by Hadia Tajik

Representative	Party	Position
Hadia Tajik	Labour	Chair
Anders B. Werp	Conservative	First deputy chair
Kjell Ingolf Ropstad	Christian Democrats	Second deputy chair
Jorodd Asphjell	Labour	
Margunn Ebbesen	Conservative	
Jan Arild Ellingsen	Progress	
Hårek Elvenes	Conservative	
Peter Christian Frølich	Conservative	
Kari Henriksen	Labour	
Jenny Klinge	Centre	
Lene Vågslid	Labour	
Ulf Leirstein	Progress	
