= Geir-Asbjørn Jørgensen =

Norwegian politician

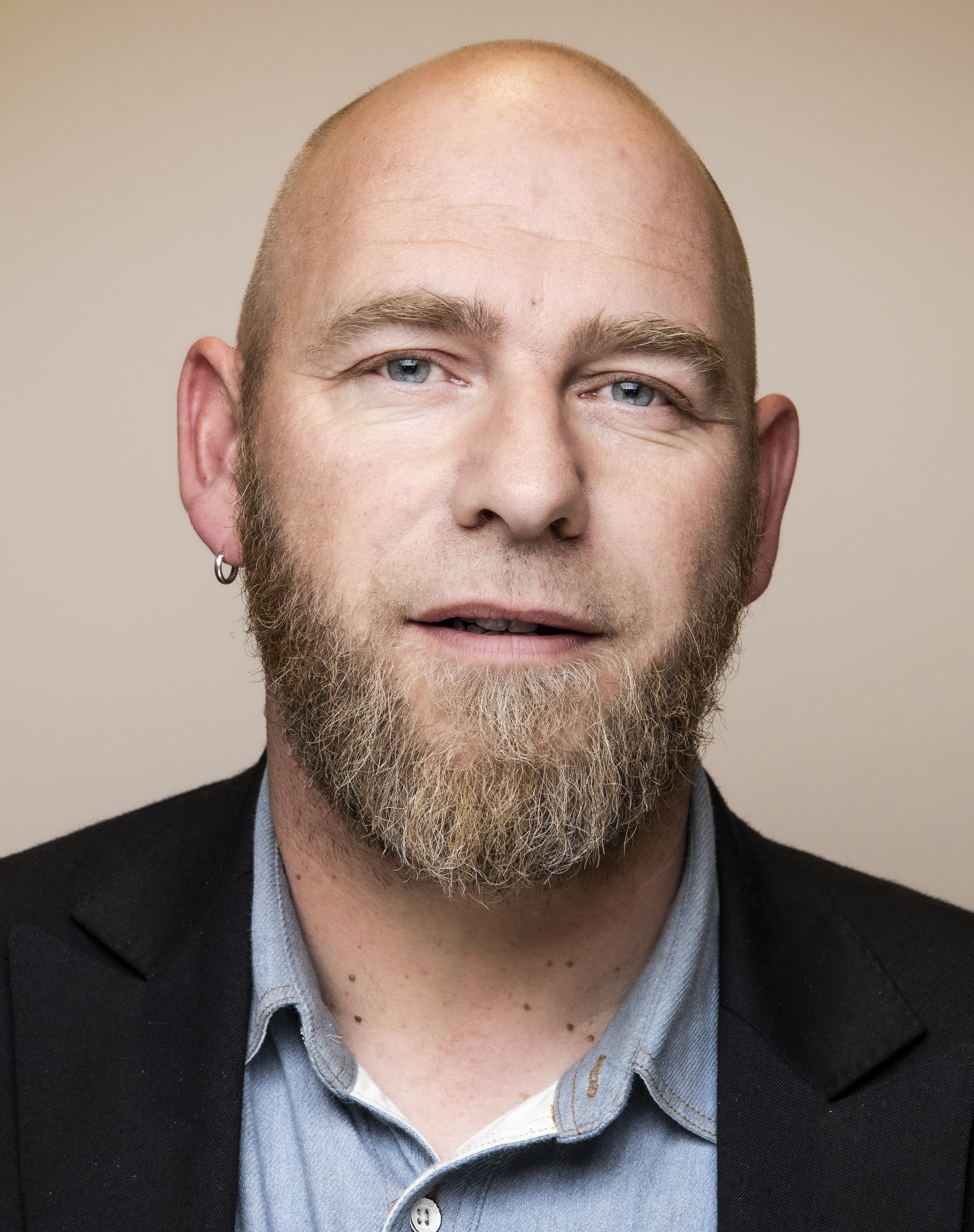

Member of the Storting
- Incumbent
- Assumed office 1 October 2021
- Constituency: Nordland

Personal details
- Born: 16 December 1972 (age 53)
- Party: Red
- Occupation: Politician

Geir-Asbjørn Jørgensen (born 16 December 1972) is a Norwegian politician.

He was elected representative to the Storting from the constituency of Nordland for the period 2021–2025, for the Red Party. He was re-elected in 2025.
