= Margunn Ebbesen =

Norwegian politician (born 1962)

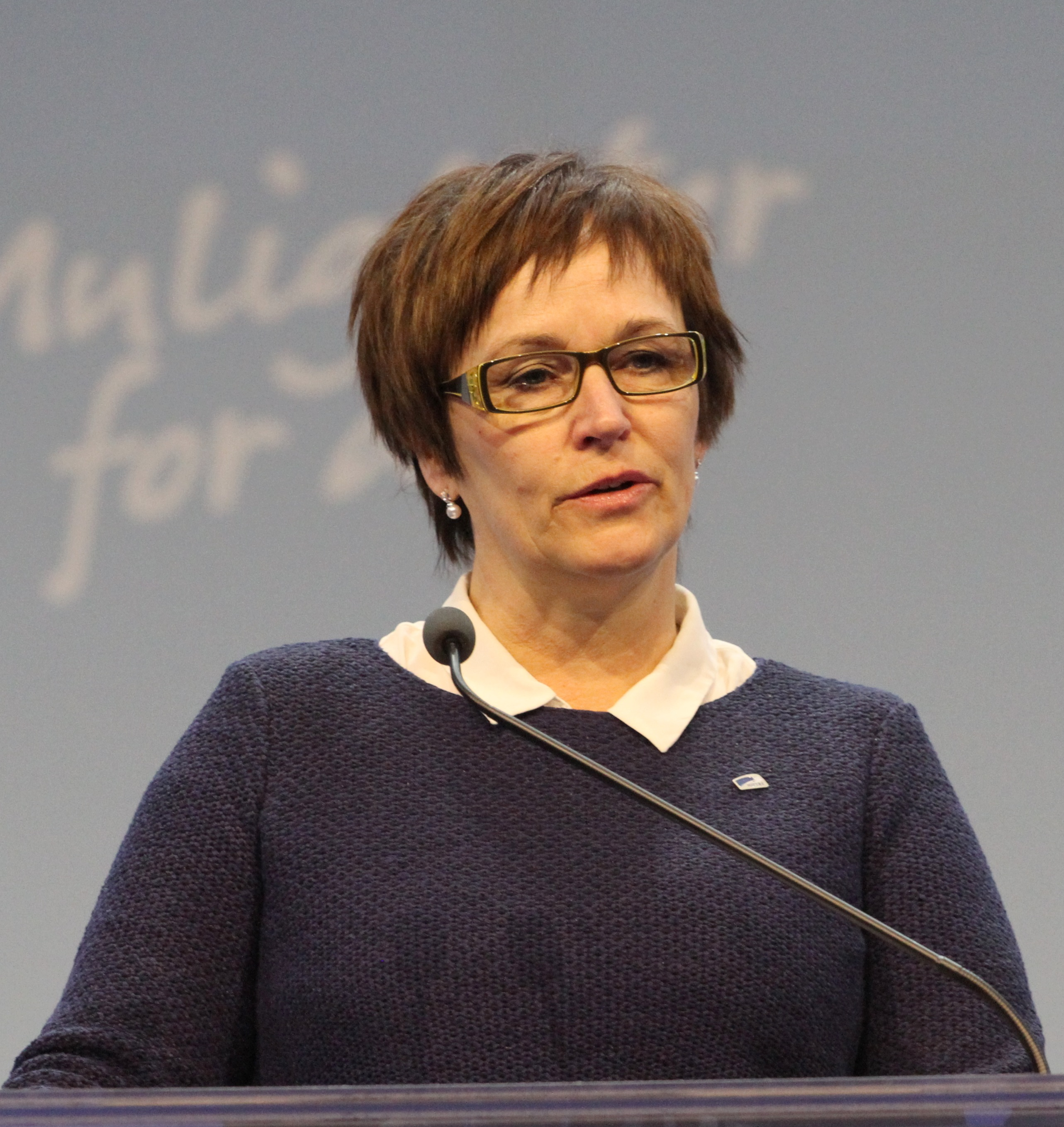
- Margunn Ebbesen in 2017
- Born: 4 September 1962 (age 63)
- Occupation: Politician
- Known for: Member of the Storting

Margunn Ebbesen (born 4 September 1962) is a Norwegian politician for the Conservative Party. She was elected to the Parliament of Norway from Nordland in 2013 where she is member of the Standing Committee on Justice.
