= Hårek Ludvig Hansen =

Norwegian politician

Hårek Ludvig Hansen (14 July 1901 – 1 March 1996) was a Norwegian politician for the Conservative Party.

He was elected to the Norwegian Parliament from Nordland in 1945, but was not re-elected in 1949.

Born in Tjøtta Municipality, Hansen was a member of the municipal council of Alstahaug Municipality from 1963 to 1965.

Outside politics he mainly worked as a fisher and farmer.
