= Lisbeth Holand =

Norwegian politician

Lisbeth Holand (born 20 January 1946, in Vikna Municipality) is a Norwegian politician for the Socialist Left Party.

She was elected to the Norwegian Parliament from Nordland in 1989, and was re-elected on one occasion. She had previously served as a deputy representative during the terms 1985–1989, and later served in this position from 1997–2001.

Holand was involved in local politics in Brønnøy Municipality. She is also a former leader of Nei til EU. In 1968–1970 she was a member of the national board of the Young Liberals of Norway.

Outside politics she graduated as cand.polit. from the University of Oslo in 1975. She worked as a school teacher, since 2000 as a lecturer at Nesna University College.

Preceded by Stein Ørnhøi	Leader of Nei til EU; 1997–1999	Succeeded by Sigbjørn Gjelsvik
