= Jens Olai Steffensen =

Norwegian politician (1891–1961)

Jens Olai Steffensen (23 March 1891 – 17 October 1961) was a Norwegian politician for the Labour Party.

He was elected to the Norwegian Parliament from Nordland in 1934, and was re-elected on four occasions.

Steffensen was born in Bø Municipality. He was a member of the municipal council of Bø Municipality from 1925 to 1928, and then served as deputy mayor during the terms 1934–1937 and 1937–1941 as well as mayor in 1945.

== Bibliography ==
- "Jens Olai Steffensen" (in Norwegian). Storting.
