= Siv Mossleth =

Norwegian politician (born 1967)

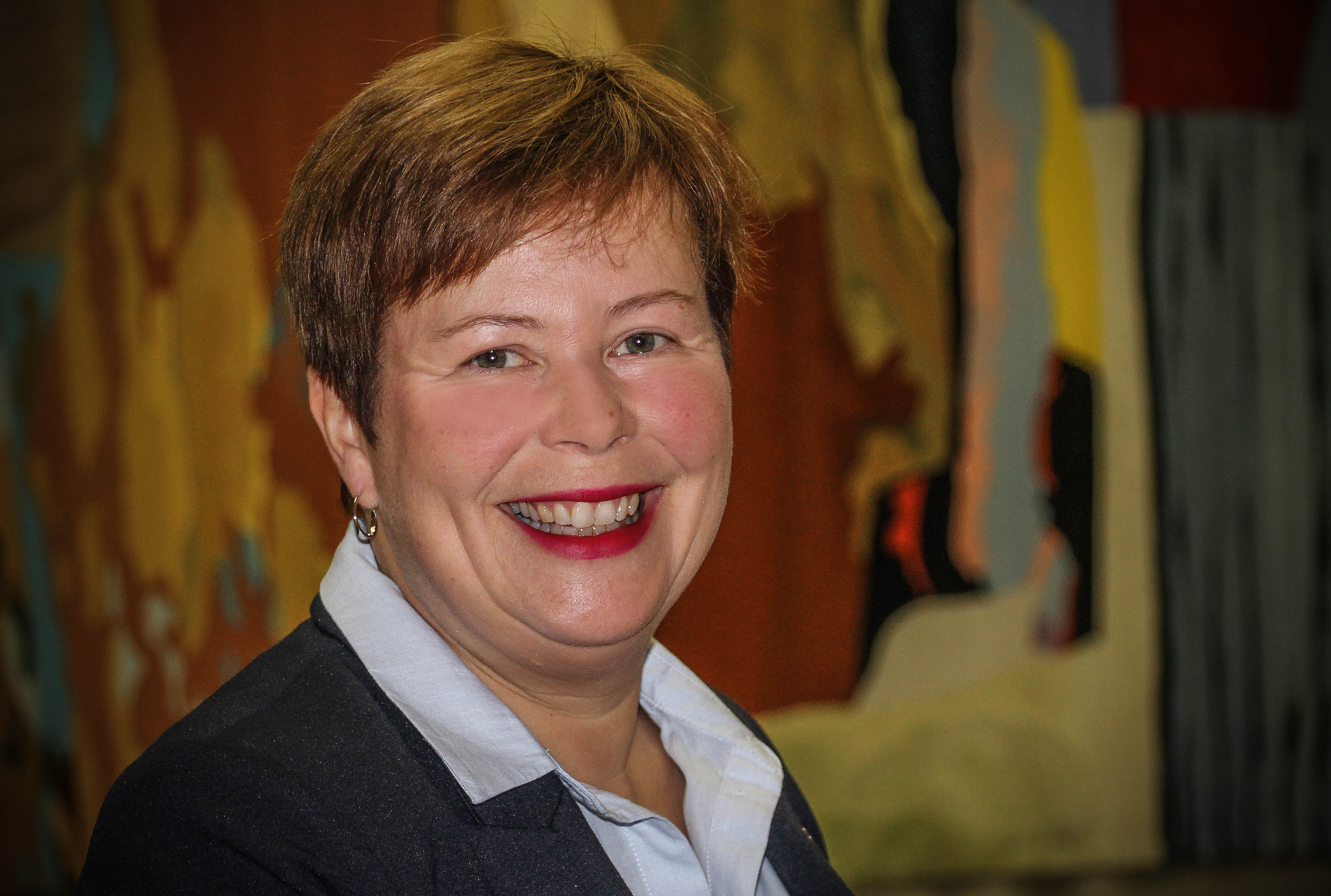
- Born: 4 April 1967 (age 59)
- Education: Agronomist
- Occupation: Politician
- Employer(s): The Norwegian Government, Forsvaret
- Notable work: Leader of OSSEs, Member of Elective Committee
- Title: Parliamentary Representative, Politician, Major General
- Political party: Centre Party
- Children: 2
- Relatives: Marianne Mossleth

Siv Mossleth (born 4 April 1967) is a Norwegian politician. She was elected representative to the Storting for the period 2017–2021 for the Centre Party, from the constituency of Nordland. She was re-elected to the Storting for the period 2021–2025.

Mossleth is an agronomist by education.
