= Willfred Nordlund =

Norwegian politician

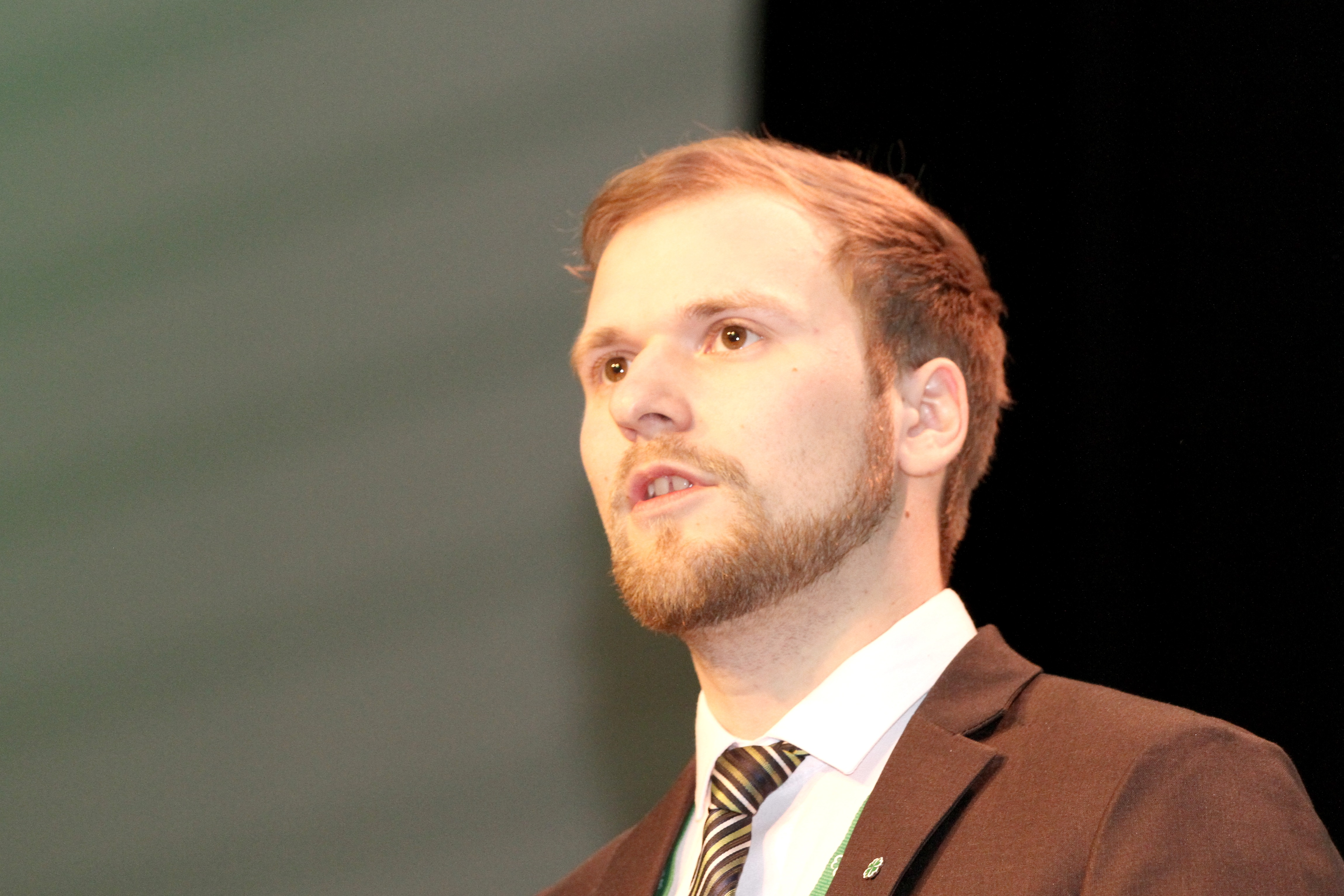
- Nordlund in 2017

Member of the Storting
- In office 1 October 2017 – 30 September 2025
- Constituency: Nordland

Deputy Member of the Storting
- In office 1 October 2009 – 30 September 2017
- Constituency: Nordland

Deputy Chairman of the Nordland County Cabinet
- In office 18 September 2015 – 3 April 2017
- Cabinet Chair: Tomas Norvoll
- Preceded by: Marit Tennfjord
- Succeeded by: Svein Eggesvik

Nordland County Commissioner for Transport
- In office 18 September 2015 – 3 April 2017
- Cabinet Chair: Tomas Norvoll
- Preceded by: Hild-Marit Olsen
- Succeeded by: Svein Eggesvik

Personal details
- Born: 18 April 1988 (age 38) Bodø, Nordland, Norway
- Party: Centre
- Education: Harstad University College (Not completed); BI Norwegian Business School
- Occupation: Politician

Willfred Nordlund (born 18 April 1988) is a Norwegian politician for the Centre Party. He served as member of the Storting for Nordland between 2017 and 2025. He previously served as deputy member between 2009 and 2017 and Nordland county commissioner for transport between 2015 and 2017.

== Political career ==
=== Local politics ===
Nordlund was a member of the Nordland County Council between 2007 and 2015 and served in the Nordland county cabinet between 2015 and 2017, during which he served as the county commissioner for transport and deputy chairman of the county cabinet. He resigned in April 2017 in order to run for parliament and was succeeded by fellow party member Svein Eggesvik.

=== Parliament ===
Nordlund served as deputy representative between 2009 and 2017, being re-elected in 2013. He was elected as a regular representative from Nordland at the 2017 election. He was re-elected in 2021.

In parliament, Nordlund was a member of the Standing Committee on Local Government and Public Administration between 2017 and 2021. He then moved to the Standing Committee on Business and Industry, of which he also serves as its chair.

== Personal life ==
He is the son of Karl-Erling Nordlund (the former mayor of Sortland Municipality) and farmer Wenche Irene Kristiansen.
