= Kenneth Svendsen =

Norwegian politician

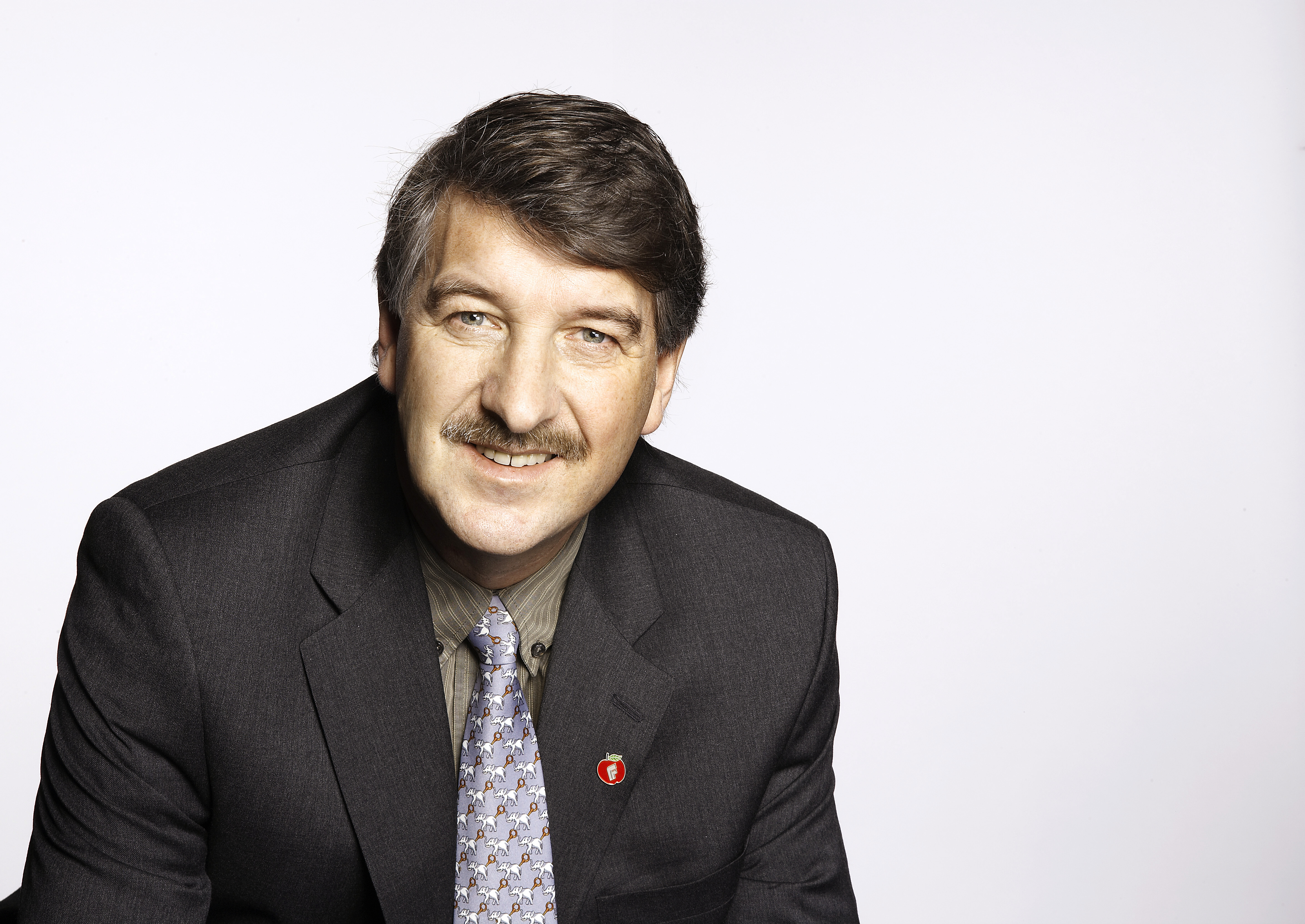
Kenneth Svendsen

Kenneth Svendsen (born 2 August 1954 in Fauske Municipality) is a Norwegian politician for the Progress Party.

== Biography ==
He was elected to the Norwegian Parliament from Nordland in 1997, and has been re-elected on two occasions.

Svendsen held various positions in the municipal council of Fauske Municipality from 1987 to 2007. From 1991 to 1999 he was also a member of Nordland county council.

He is vice-president of the Storting since 2009.
