= Torny Pedersen =

Norwegian politician

Torny Pedersen (born 18 February 1946 in Namsos Municipality) is a Norwegian politician for the Labour Party.

She was elected to the Norwegian Parliament from Nordland in 1997, and has been re-elected on two occasions. Pedersen was a member of the municipal council of Fauske Municipality from 1987 to 1991, later serving as deputy mayor 1995–1997.
