= Hans Svendsgård =

Norwegian politician

- Born: 19 July 1937; Meløy Municipality, Norway
- Died: 15 July 1996 (aged 58)
- Occupation: Politician

Hans Svendsgård (19 July 1937 – 15 July 1996) was a Norwegian politician.

He was born in Meløy Municipality to Albert Ole Svendsgård and Helmine Taraldsen. He was elected representative to the Storting for Nordland for the period 1981–1985 for the Conservative Party, and reelected for the period 1985–1989.
