= Anton Djupvik =

Norwegian politician

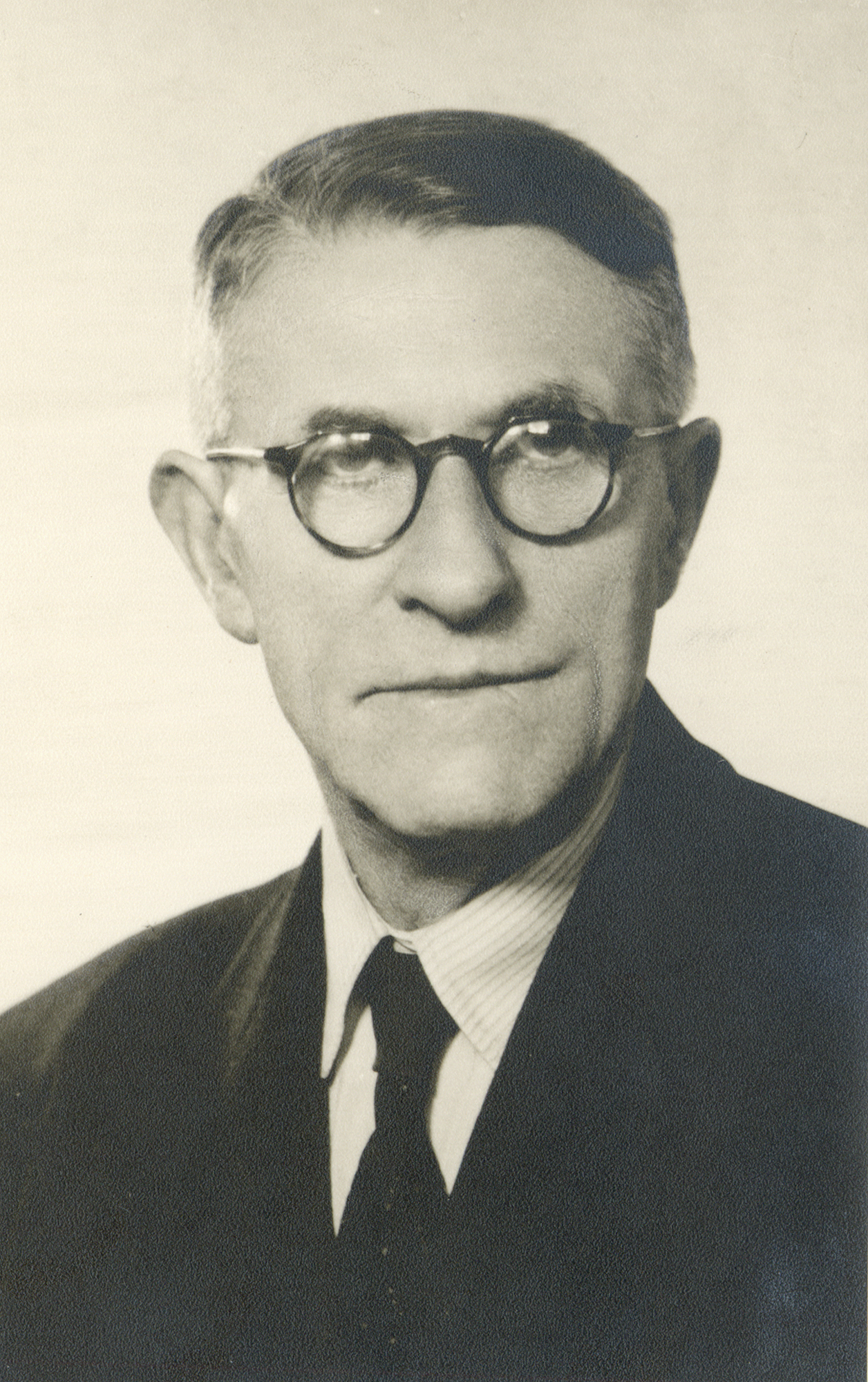
Image of Anton Djupvik

Anton Olai Normann Ingebrigtsen Djupvik (6 June 1881 – 24 March 1951) was a Norwegian politician for the Liberal Party.

He was born in Ofoten Municipality.

He was elected to the Norwegian Parliament from Nordland in 1919, and was re-elected in 1925, 1928, 1931 and 1945. In between he served in the position of deputy representative during the terms 1922–1924, 1934–1936 and 1937–1945.

Ingebrigtsen Djupvik was a member of the municipal council of Fauske Municipality during the terms 1916–1919, 1922–1925, 1930–1931, 1931–1934, 1934–1937 and 1937–1941.
