= Åsa Elvik =

Norwegian politician

Åsa Elvik (born 12 January 1979 in Bø Municipality) is a Norwegian politician for the Socialist Left Party (SV). She was elected to the Norwegian Parliament from Nordland in 2001.

She was a member of the Nordland county council from 1999-2001.

== Parliamentary committee duties ==
- 2005 - 2009 member of the Standing Committee on Local Government and Public Administration.
- 2005 - 2009 deputy member of the Electoral Committee.
- 2001 - 2005 member of the Standing Committee on Business and Industry.
- 2001 - 2005 member of the Electoral Committee.
