= Parelius Hjalmar Bang Berntsen =

Norwegian politician (1910–1995)

Parelius Hjalmar Bang Berntsen (24 February 1910 – 16 May 1995) was a Norwegian politician for the Labour Party.

He was born in Fauske Municipality.

He was elected to the Norwegian Parliament from Nordland in 1945, and was re-elected on four occasions.

Bang Berntsen was deputy mayor of Nord-Rana Municipality during the period 1937–1941.
