= Asbjørn Holm =

Norwegian politician

Asbjørn Antoni Holm (9 April 1921 – 4 February 2001) was a Norwegian politician for the Socialist People's Party.

He was born in Langenes Municipality in Vesterålen, Norway.

He was elected to the Norwegian Parliament from Nordland in 1961, and was re-elected on one occasion. His party only held two seats during both these terms.
