= Erling Engan =

Norwegian politician

Erling Engan (14 June 1910 – 9 May 1982) was a Norwegian politician for the Centre Party.

He was born in Saltdal Municipality.

He was elected to the Norwegian Parliament from Nordland in 1954, and was re-elected on four occasions.

Engan was a member of the executive committee of the municipal council of Saltdal Municipality from 1951 to 1979. He chaired the regional party chapter from 1951 to 1954, and was a member of the national party board during this period as well as from 1958 to 1973.

He was also active in the Norwegian Society for Rescue at Sea and the Norwegian Agrarian Association.
