= Ivar Kristiansen =

Norwegian politician

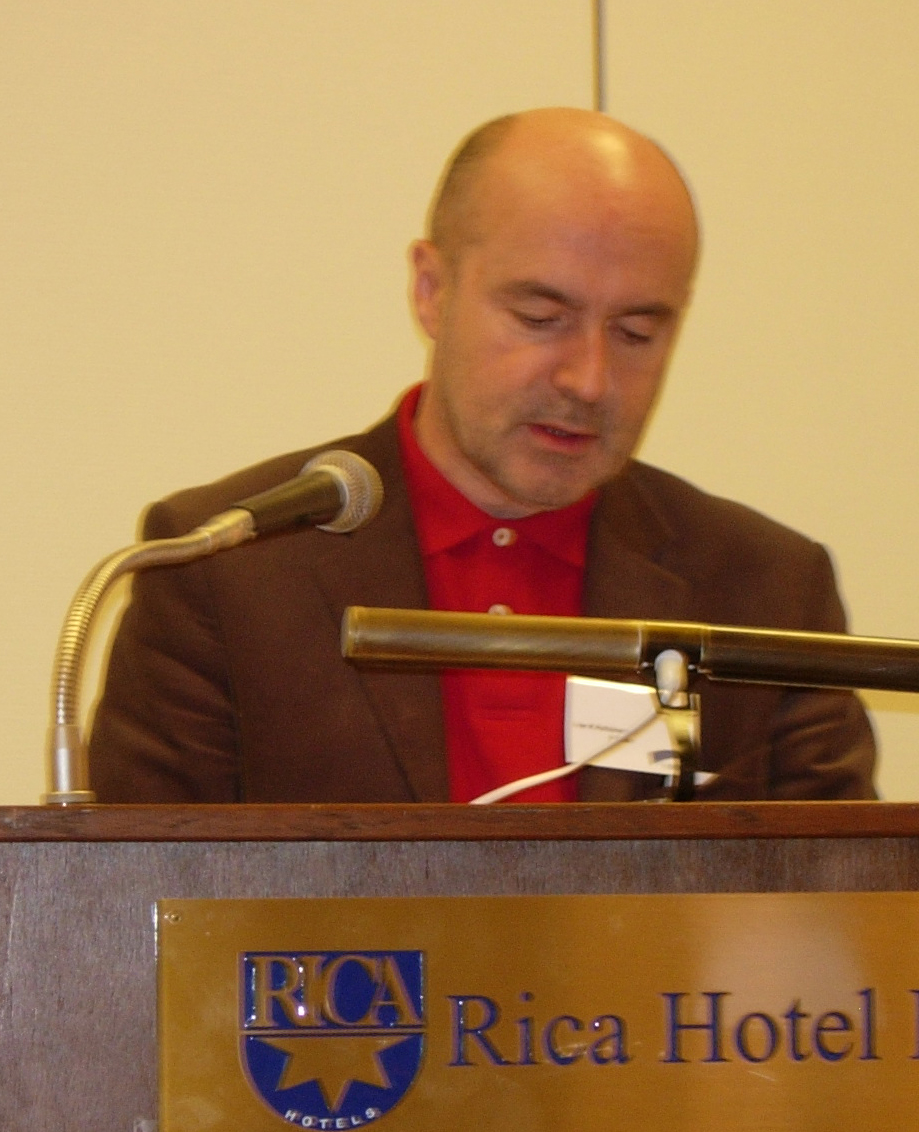
Ivar Kristiansen

Ivar Kristiansen (born 18 February 1956, in Hadsel Municipality) is a Norwegian politician for the Conservative Party.

He was elected to the Norwegian Parliament from Nordland in 1997, and has been re-elected on two occasions.

Kristiansen was a member of the executive committee of the municipal council for Hadsel Municipality from 1987 to 1995. From 1995 to 1997 he was deputy mayor of the Nordland county council.
