= Anna Ljunggren =

Norwegian politician

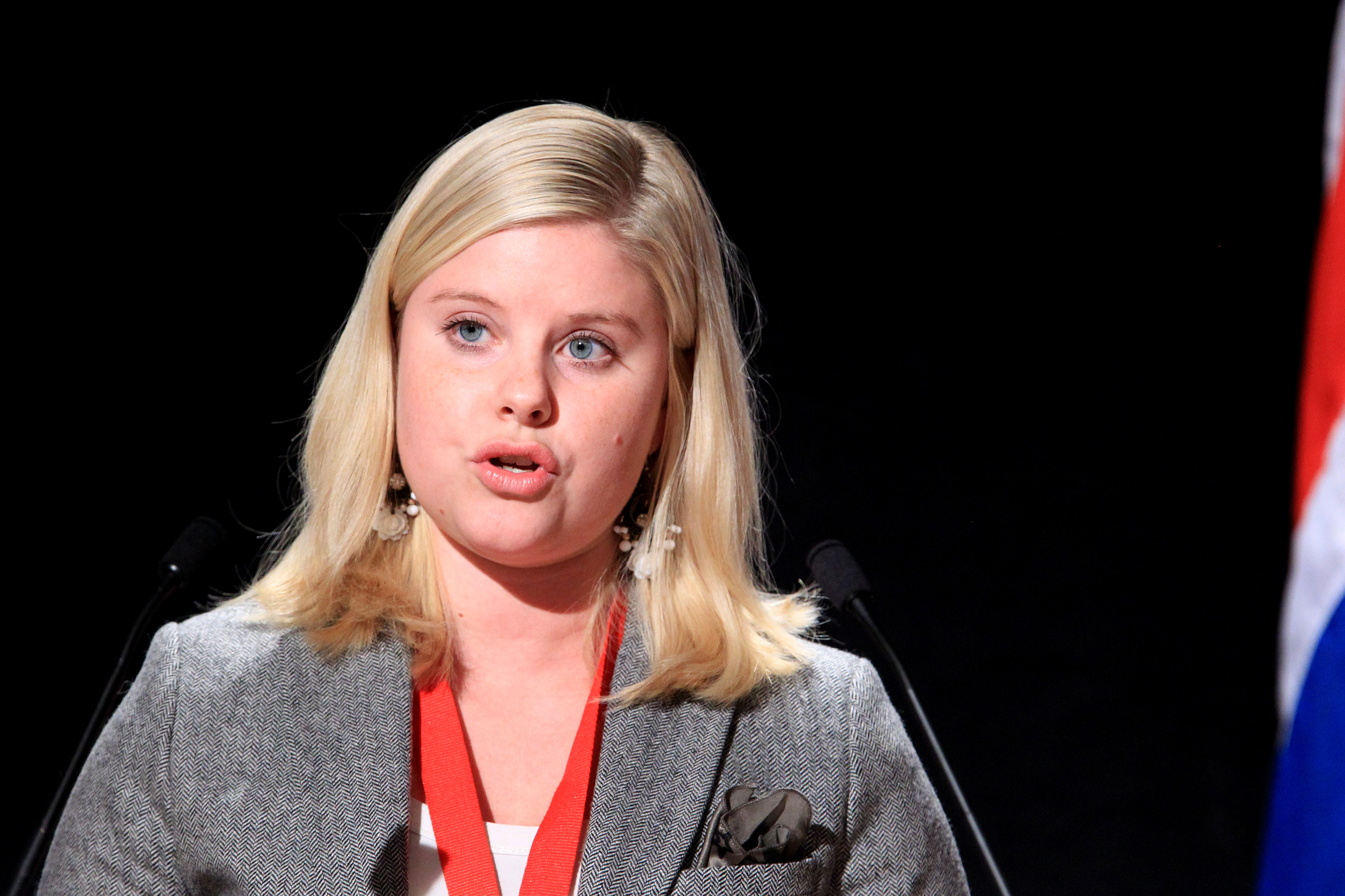
Anna-Kristin Ljunggren

Anna-Kristin Ljunggren (born 13 June 1984 in Narvik) is a Norwegian politician for the Labour Party.

She was elected to the Norwegian Parliament from Nordland in 2005. At 21, Ljunggren became the youngest parliamentarian in Norwegian history, along with Trond Jensrud, who was 21 when he was elected in 1989.

On the local level she was a member of the executive committee of the municipal council of Narvik Municipality from 2003 to 2005.

Anna Ljunggren is the daughter of Per Åge Ljunggren, associate professor and rector at the Narvik University College.
