= Jonas Enge =

Norwegian politician

Jonas Enge (24 April 1908 – 11 March 1981) was a Norwegian politician for the Labour Party.

He was born in Vik in Sømna Municipality.

He was elected to the Parliament of Norway from Nordland in 1950, and was re-elected on four occasions.

Enge was deputy mayor of Sømna Municipality in the periods 1945–1947, 1947–1951 and 1951–1952, and then rose to the position of mayor which he held from 1952 to 1955. He chaired the local party chapter from 1945 to 1947, and the regional chapter from 1947 to 1950.

Outside politics he worked as a farmer and a sub-postmaster. His father Cornelius Enge (1866–1940) was a farmer, sub-postmaster and member of parliament too.
