= Geir-Ketil Hansen =

Norwegian politician

Geir-Ketil Hansen (born 13 March 1956 in Narvik) is a Norwegian politician for the Socialist Left Party.

He was elected to the Norwegian Parliament from Nordland in 2001, but was not re-elected in 2005. He served in the position of deputy representative during the terms 1989–1993 and 2005–2009.

On the local level, Hansen was a member of the executive committee of the municipal council of Narvik Municipality from 1979 to 1987. From 1999 to 2001 and 2005 to 2011 he was a member of Nordland county cabinet.

In 2006, he started working at the Office of the Auditor General of Norway.
