= Stein Ørnhøi =

Norwegian politician (born 1935)

Stein Ørnhøi (born 15 November 1935 in Trondheim) is a Norwegian politician for the Socialist Left Party, he was the last party leader of the Socialist People's Party of Norway.

Ørnhøi was raised in Trondheim, earned his university entrance certificate in 1954, and graduated from the teacher's college in Levanger in 1958. He moved to Østfold, where he started his career as politician as the chair on the school board in Tune Municipality in 1961.

He continued his teaching career until 1961, when he joined the Norwegian Broadcasting Corporation as a producer, primarily for children's programming.

In 1977, he was elected to Norwegian parliament as a representative from Oslo. He was re-elected in 1981. During his tenure in parliament, he was a member of the finance committee, the extended foreign affairs and constitutional committee, and the consumer and administration committee, and the protocol committee.

Since Ørnhøi left parliament, he moved to Sandøya, an island in Tvedestrand Municipality in southern Norway and has been involved in a number of appointments. He was in the leadership of Nei til EU, the central organization opposing Norwegian membership in the European Union. He has served on the boards of several corporations including Vinmonopolet, Banque Paribas in Norway, and the Norwegian Broadcasting Corporation. He has also been active in historical and cultural affairs.

Preceded by Kristen Nygaard	Leader of Nei til EU; 1995–1997	Succeeded by Lisbeth Holand
