= Halvor Bjellaanes =

Norwegian politician

- Born: June 19, 1925; Mo i Rana, Nordland, Norway
- Died: October 7, 2010 (aged 85)
- Occupations: Politician, Lawyer
- Political party: Liberal Party

Halvor Bjellaanes (19 June 1925 – 7 October 2010) was a Norwegian officer, bank manager, and politician for the Liberal Party between the years 1965 and 1969.

== Political career ==
Bjellaanes was involved in local politics in Korgen Municipality and Vefsn Municipality between the years 1959 and 1963. He was elected to the Norwegian Parliament from Nordland in 1965 for one term, losing re-election in 1969.
