= Hanne Dyveke Søttar =

Norwegian politician (born 1965)

Hanne Dyveke Søttar (born 16 August 1965) is a Norwegian politician for the Progress Party.

She served as a deputy representative to the Norwegian Parliament from Nordland during the term 1997–2001 and from Sør-Trøndelag during the terms 2001–2005 and 2005–2009.

On the local level she has been a member of Trondheim city council.
