= Ragna Berget Jørgensen =

Norwegian politician

Ragna Berget Jørgensen (born 19 November 1941 in Skogn) is a Norwegian politician for the Labour Party.

Jørgensen was a member of the municipal council of Bodø Municipality between 1979 and 1983. She was elected to the Norwegian Parliament from Nordland in 1981, and was re-elected on three occasions.

She resides at Evje in Bærum Municipality.
