= Anne-Lise Steinbach =

Norwegian politician

Member of the Storting
- In office 10 September 1973 – 14 September 1981
- Constituency: Nordland

Member of Municipal Council of Bø Municipality
- In office 14 September 1987 – 9 September 1991

Personal details
- Born: 3 June 1935 (age 91) Bø, Vesterålen, Norway
- Party: Labour Party
- Education: University of Tromsø

Anne-Lise Steinbach (born 3 June 1935) is a Norwegian politician for the Labour Party. She was elected to the Norwegian Parliament from Nordland in 1973, and was re-elected on one occasion.

On the local level she was a member of the municipal council of Bø Municipality from 1987 to 1991. Outside politics she started her professional career in telephony. Later, in 1993, she graduated from the University of Tromsø.
