= Kristoffer Skåne Grytnes =

Norwegian politician (1887–1965)

Kristoffer Skåne Grytnes (27 July 1887 – 22 July 1965) was a Norwegian politician for the Christian Democratic Party.

He was born in Horten. He was elected to the Norwegian Parliament from Nordland in 1950, but was not re-elected in 1954.

Outside politics he worked as a school teacher in Grue, Horten, Drammen, Eidanger and Helgeland. He was a long-time member and deputy leader of the Diocese Council of Hålogaland.
