= Janne Sjelmo Nordås =

Norwegian politician (born 1964)

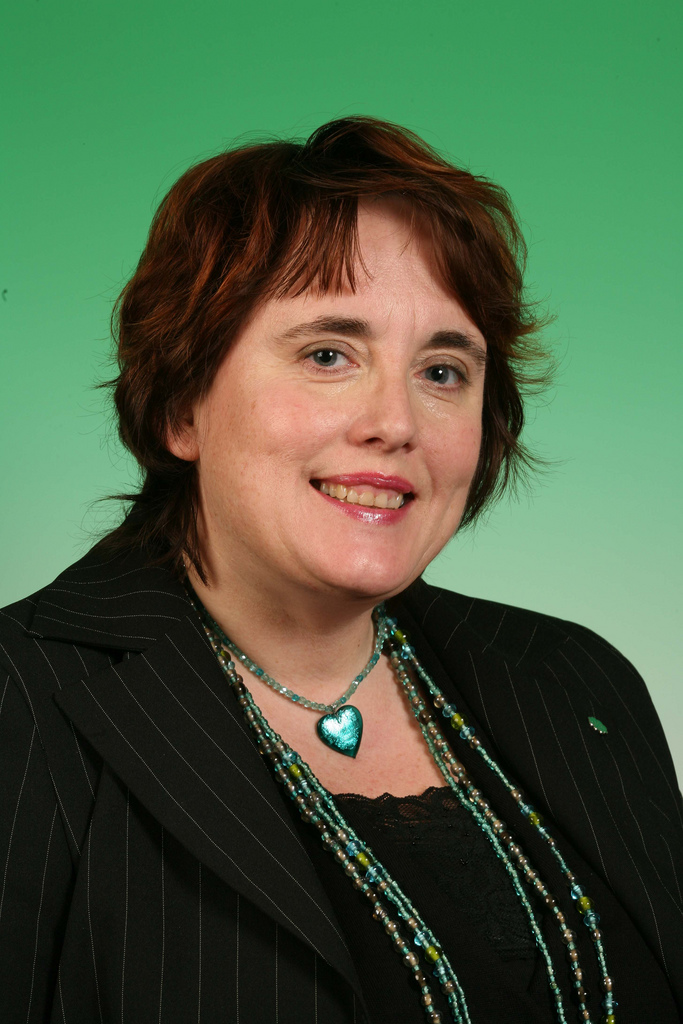
Janne Sjelmo Nordås

Janne Sjelmo Nordås (born 11 May 1964) is a Norwegian politician for the Centre Party.

She served in the position of deputy representative to the Norwegian Parliament from Nordland during the terms 2001–2005 and 2005–2009, and was elected to a seat in parliament for the 2009–2013 term. Nordås was appointed State Secretary in the Ministry of Local Government and Regional Development in November 2007, replacing Guri Størvold.

On the local level she was a member of the municipal council of Hattfjelldal Municipality from 1995 to 2003. In 1999 she also became a member of Nordland county council. From 2004 to 2007 she chaired the county party chapter.
