= Lauritz Johan Riise =

Norwegian politician

- Born: 2 August 1910; Sortland, Norway
- Died: 30 April 1978 (aged 67)
- Occupation: Politician

Lauritz Johan Riise (2 August 1910 – 30 April 1978) was a Norwegian politician.

He was born in Sortland Municipality to Lauritz Johan Riise Sr. and Julie Berg. He was elected representative to the Storting for Nordland for the period 1954–1957 for the Conservative Party.
