= Inger Pedersen =

Norwegian politician

Inger Pedersen (3 May 1936, Flekkefjord – 1 August 2023) was a Norwegian politician for the Labour Party.

She was elected to the Norwegian Parliament from Nordland in 1985, and was re-elected on one occasion. She had previously served in the position of deputy representative during the term 1981–1985.

Pedersen held various positions in Narvik Municipality in the periods 1967–1971 and 1983–1987.
