= Sigurd Lund Hamran =

Norwegian politician (1902–1977)

Sigurd Lund Hamran (24 January 1902 – 4 November 1977) was a Norwegian politician for the Labour Party.

He was born in Flakstad Municipality.

He was elected to the Norwegian Parliament from Nordland in 1954, and was re-elected on three occasions. He had previously been a deputy representative in the periods 1945–1949 and 1950–1953. During these terms, from December 1945 to November 1951 he served as a regular representative meanwhile Reidar Carlsen was appointed to the Cabinet.

Hamran was deputy mayor of Moskenes Municipality in the periods 1937–1941, 1955–1959, 1959–1961 and 1962–1963. He had brief spells as mayor in 1945 and 1961, and regained this position during the terms 1963–1967 and 1967–1971.
