= Kari Økland =

Norwegian politician (born 1955)

Kari Økland (born 16 December 1955 in Bergen) is a Norwegian politician for the Christian Democratic Party.

She was elected to the Norwegian Parliament from Nordland in 1997, but was not re-elected in 2001. Instead she served in the position of deputy representative during the term 2001–2005.

Økland was involved in local politics and elected to the municipal council for Hemnes Municipality from 1983 to 1995.
