= Kolbjørn Varmann =

Norwegian politician (1904–1980)

Governor of Finnmark
- In office 1 October 1965 – 30 September 1973
- Preceded by: Anders Aune (acting)
- Succeeded by: Anders Aune

Minister of Transport and Communications
- In office 22 January 1955 – 23 April 1960
- Prime Minister: Einar Gerhardsen
- Preceded by: Jakob Martin Pettersen
- Succeeded by: Trygve Bratteli

Member of the Norwegian Parliament
- In office 1 October 1950 – 30 September 1965
- Constituency: Nordland

Personal details
- Born: Kolbjørn Sigurd Werner Varmann; 23 December 1904 Eid Municipality, Norway
- Died: 13 August 1980 (aged 75) Oslo, Norway
- Party: Labour Party
- Occupation: Politician, priest

Kolbjørn Sigurd Werner Varmann (23 December 1904 – 13 August 1980) was a Norwegian priest and politician for the Labour Party. He is known as Minister of Transport and Communications from 1955 to 1960, and also as County Governor of Finnmark.

== Early life and career ==
He was born in Eid Municipality as a son of as a son of Anders Kornelius Karlsen (1871–1940) and Astrid Langeland (1879–1932). He enrolled as a student in 1924, and graduated with the cand.theol. degree in 1929. He worked as a school teacher in Nordfjordeid from 1930 to 1931 before becoming curate in the Diocese of Hålogaland in 1931. While holding this position, he founded the upper secondary school in Tysfjord Municipality. From 1935 he chaired the school board in the municipality, and in 1936 he became vicar in Tysfjord. During World War II he was a member of the Norwegian resistance movement, organizing illegal emigration to Sweden. He was arrested by the Nazi German authorities, but survived and was decorated with the Defence Medal 1940–1945.

== National politics ==
After the war he returned to Tysfjord as a vicar. He was also the dean of Nordre Salten, but left both positions in 1963. He was also a lieutenant in the Home Guard from 1946 to 1958. He became involved in politics, serving as mayor of Tysfjord from 1945 to 1955, and was a member of Nordland county council during the same period. He was elected to the Parliament of Norway from Nordland in 1950, and was re-elected on three occasions, the last term ending in 1965. From January 1955 to April 1960 he was the Minister of Transport and Communications in Gerhardsen's Third Cabinet. During this time his seat in parliament was taken by Margith Johanne Munkebye and Rolf Hellem. His career ended with the post of County Governor of Finnmark, which he held from 1965 to 1974. He was appointed in 1963, but since he was a parliament member, Anders Aune served as Acting County Governor.

He was also a deputy board member of the Office of the Auditor General of Norway, a board member of Utbyggingsfondet for Nord-Norge. He was awarded the HM The King's Medal of Merit in gold in 1980, but never physically received the medal as he died in August 1980.

Political offices
Preceded by Jakob Martin Pettersen	Norwegian Minister of Transport and Communications; 1955–1960	Succeeded by Trygve Bratteli
Civic offices
Preceded by Anders Aune (acting)	County Governor of Finnmark; 1965–1974	Succeeded by Anders Aune
