= Margith Johanne Munkebye =

Norwegian politician

Margith Johanne Munkebye (15 October 1911 – 28 November 2000) was a Norwegian politician for the Labour Party.

She was born in Bodø.

She was elected to the Norwegian Parliament from Nordland in 1958, and was re-elected on three occasions. She had previously been a deputy representative in the periods 1954–1957. During part of this term she served as a regular representative meanwhile Kolbjørn Sigurd Verner Varmann was appointed to the Cabinet.

Munkebye was a member of the municipal council for Bodø Municipality in the period 1951–1955.
