= Bjørn Larsen (politician) =

Norwegian politician (born 1967)

Member of the Storting
- Incumbent
- Assumed office 1 October 2025
- Constituency: Nordland

Nordland County Commissioner for Trade
- In office 23 October 2023 – 20 September 2025
- Cabinet Chair: Svein Eggesvik
- Preceded by: Linda Helén Haukland
- Succeeded by: Svein Eggesvik

Personal details
- Born: 30 August 1967 (age 58)
- Party: Progress

Bjørn Larsen (born 30 August 1967) is a Norwegian politician serving as a member of the Storting for Nordland since 2025. A member of the Progress Party, Larsen served as the Nordland County Commissioner for Trade between 2023 and 2025, having previously been a member of the Vefsn Municipal Council and the Nordland County Council.

== Political career ==
=== Local politics ===
Larsen has served in the Vefsn Municipal Council since 1995. During this time, he notably served as deputy group leader from 2003 to 2011 and group leader from 1995 to 2003. He also served as a deputy member to the Nordland County Council between 2015 and 2023 before being elected as a regular member in 2023. As a deputy member, he also met permanently between 2017 and 2019.

Larsen was appointed Nordland county commissioner for trade in Svein Eggesvik's county cabinet in October 2023. He was succeeded by Eggesvik after stepping down in order to take his seat in parliament.

=== Parliament ===
Larsen was elected to the Storting from Nordland at the 2025 election.

He previously served as a deputy member from Nordland between 2001 and 2005 and again between 2017 and 2021.

== See also ==
- List of members of the Storting, 2025–2029
