= Inge Myrvoll =

Norwegian politician (1948–2020)

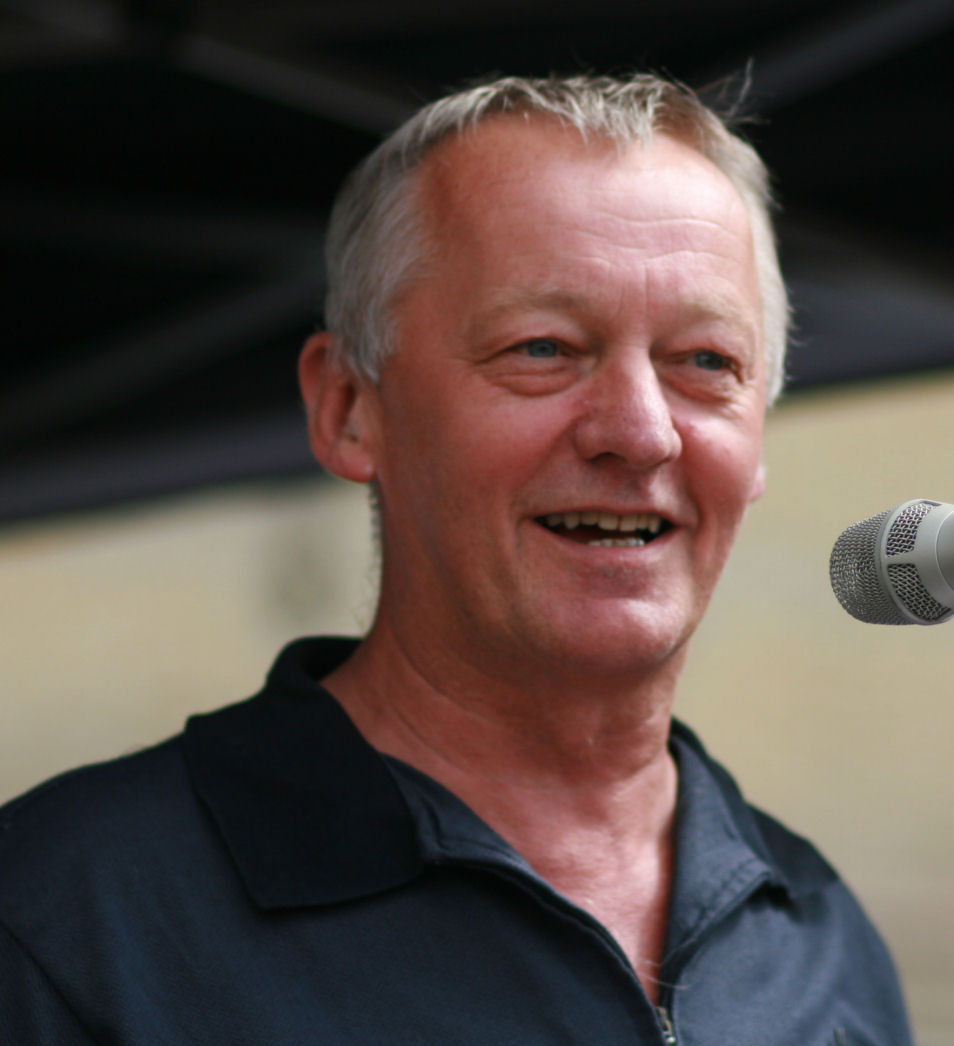

Inge Myrvoll (21 June 1948 – 25 October 2020) was a Norwegian politician for the Socialist Left Party and trade unionist from Rana Municipality.

Myrvoll graduated from secondary school in 1968. He had various jobs in the construction industry until 1972, when he became a student. From 1975 he worked as a slaughter until 1978, when he started working at Norsk Jernverk. He was a full-time trade unionist from 1983 to 1988. In 1989, he was elected to the Parliament of Norway representing Nordland. He was re-elected on two occasions. While in parliament, he sat on the Standing Committee on Transport and Communications. From 2001 to 2005, he sat as a deputy member. Myrvoll was mayor of Rana from 2003 to 2007, and has been deputy mayor since 2009.
