= Hilde Grande =

Norwegian politician (born 1975)

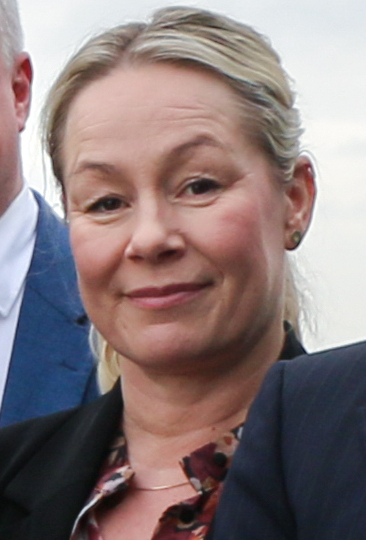
- Grande in 2026

Member of the Storting
- Incumbent
- Assumed office 1 October 2025
- Constituency: Nordland

Personal details
- Born: 25 February 1975 (age 51)
- Party: Progress

Hilde Grande (born 25 February 1975) is a Norwegian politician from the Progress Party (FrP). She was elected to the Storting in the 2025 Norwegian parliamentary election.

Grande was elected a municipal council representative in the 2023 Norwegian local elections for Vestvågøy.
