= Tor-Arne Strøm =

Norwegian politician

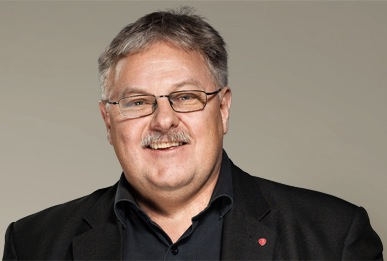
Tor-Arne Strøm

Tor-Arne Strøm (born 6 May 1952, in Rana Municipality) is a Norwegian politician for the Labour Party.

He was elected to the Norwegian Parliament from Nordland in 2001, and has been re-elected on two occasions.

Strøm held various positions on the municipal council for Rana Municipality from 1987 to 1991 and 1995 to 2001, serving as deputy mayor in 1999–2001. From 1991 to 1999 he was deputy member of Nordland county council.

Outside politics he has been a factory worker and a trade unionist.
