= Peter Angelsen =

Norwegian politician (born 1935)

Minister of Fisheries
- In office 17 October 1997 – 21 January 2000
- Prime Minister: Kjell Magne Bondevik
- Preceded by: Karl Eirik Schjøtt-Pedersen
- Succeeded by: Lars Peder Brekk

Minister of Nordic Cooperation
- In office 16 March 1999 – 21 January 2000
- Prime Minister: Kjell Magne Bondevik
- Preceded by: Ragnhild Haarstad
- Succeeded by: Kåre Gjønnes

Member of the Norwegian Parliament
- In office 1 October 1981 – 30 September 1997
- Constituency: Nordland

Personal details
- Born: 6 February 1935 (age 91) Vestvågøy, Nordland, Norway
- Party: Centre

Peter Jon Angelsen (born 6 February 1935) is a Norwegian politician for the Centre Party (Sp). He was born in Vestvågøy Municipality in Nordland county. He represented Nordland in the Storting for four periods, from 1981 to 1997. He served as Minister of Fisheries in the first government of Kjell Magne Bondevik, from 1997, as well as minister of Nordic cooperation from 1999 until he resigned on 21 January 2000, to be replaced by Lars Peder Brekk. He was said to have resigned due to old age and wanting to let someone new take over.
