= Mona Nilsen =

Norwegian politician

- Born: 17 September 1973 (age 53)
- Occupation: Politician
- Political party: Labour Party

Mona Nilsen (born 17 September 1973) is a Norwegian politician for the Labour Party, a member of the Storting since 2021..

== Biography ==
Nilsen was born on 17 September 1973. She hails from Narvik, and was a member of the municipal council of Narvik from 2015 to 2019.

She was elected representative to the Storting from the constituency of Nordland for the period 2021–2025, for the Labour Party. In the Storting, she is a member of the Standing Committee on Finance and Economic Affairs from 2021 to 2025.

Nilsen is educated in child protection, and has worked as a therapist. A trade unionist, she was county leader of the Nordland section of the Norwegian Union of Social Educators and Social Workers from 2005 to 2015.
