= Hans Berg =

Norwegian politician (1902–1980)

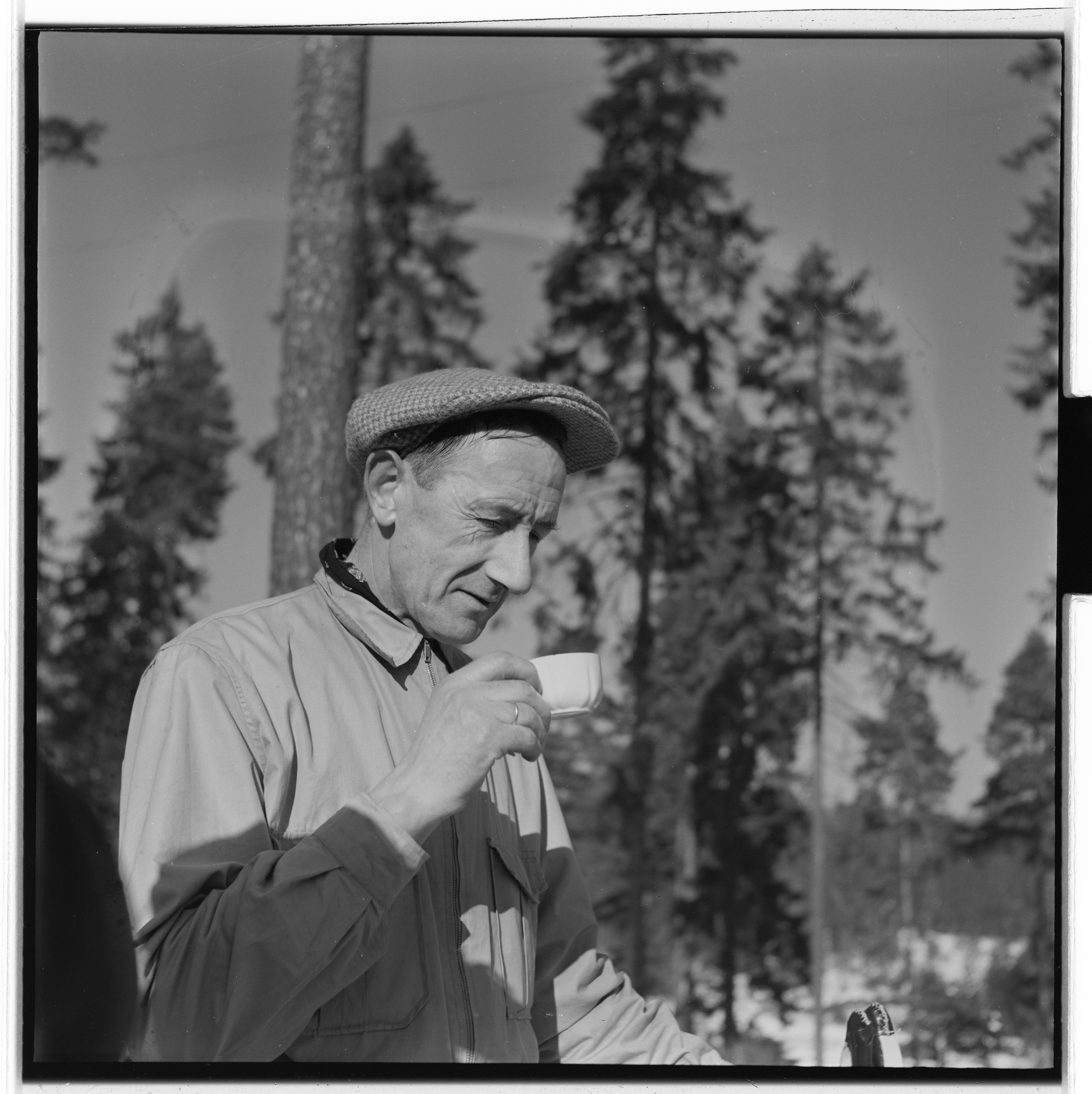
A picture of Hans Berg

Hans Berg (25 February 1902 – 15 August 1980) was a Norwegian politician for the Christian Democratic Party.

He was born in Bodin Municipality.

He was elected to the Norwegian Parliament from Nordland in 1954, and was re-elected on three occasions.

Berg was mayor of Bodin Municipality during the period 1951–1955, and in total he held various positions here from 1936 to 1967.
