= Øystein Mathisen =

Norwegian politician (born 1991)

Member of the Storting
- Incumbent
- Assumed office 1 October 2021
- Constituency: Nordland

Personal details
- Born: 17 March 1991 (age 35)
- Party: Labour
- Education: Nord University
- Occupation: Politician; Journalist

Øystein Mathisen (born 17 March 1991) is a Norwegian journalist and politician for the Labour Party.

He was elected representative to the Storting (Norwegian supreme legislature) from the constituency of Nordland in 2021, for the Labour Party. He was re-elected in 2025. Mathisen is a journalist by profession and studied journalism at Nord University.
