= Thea Knutzen =

Norwegian politician

Thea Knutzen (née Haaland; 4 July 1930 – 4 March 2016) was a Norwegian politician for the Conservative Party, born in Harstad.

Knutzen was a member of the municipal council for Sortland Municipality between 1967 and 1983, the last four years in the executive committee. She was elected to the Parliament of Norway from Nordland in 1985, and was re-elected in 1989. She had previously served in the position of deputy representative during the terms 1981–1985.

She died on 4 March 2016, aged 85.
