= Rolf Hellem =

Norwegian politician (1923–2021)

Personal details
- Born: 26 December 1923; Sør-Frøya Municipality
- Died: 6 June 2021 (aged 97)

Rolf Hellem (26 December 1923 – 6 June 2021) was a Norwegian politician for the Labour Party.

He was elected to the Norwegian Parliament from Nordland in 1965, and was re-elected on three occasions. He had previously served in the position of deputy representative during the term 1958–1961, during which he met as a regular representative meanwhile Kolbjørn Sigurd Verner Varmann was appointed to the Cabinet, and also during the term 1961–1965.

Hellem was involved in local politics in Ankenes Municipality from 1951 to 1955. He died in June 2021 at the age of 97.
