= Jan Sahl =

Norwegian politician

Jan Sahl (born 20 April 1950 in Meløy Municipality) is a Norwegian politician who was a member of the Norwegian Parliament for Nordland county from 1997 to 2009. He is a member of the Christian Democratic Party. He is the son of Johan Sahl and Marie Frislid.
