= Bård Ludvig Thorheim =

Norwegian politician

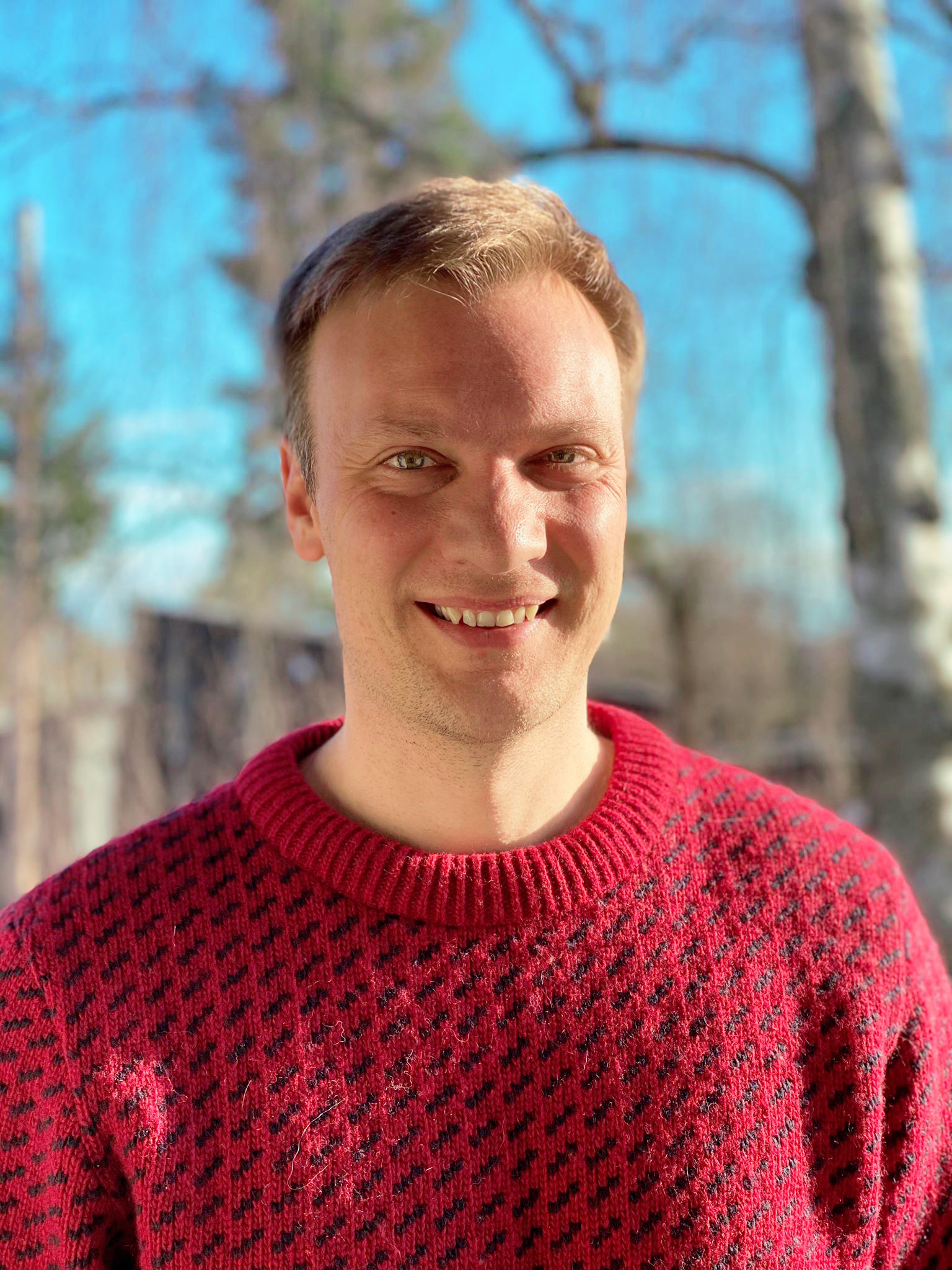

Member of the Storting
- Incumbent
- Assumed office 1 October 2021
- Constituency: Nordland

Personal details
- Born: 15 October 1976 (age 49) Bodø, Nordland, Norway
- Party: Conservative
- Occupation: Politician; Diplomat; Researcher

Military service
- Allegiance: Norway
- Branch/service: Norwegian Army
- Years of service: 1995–1996
- Rank: Sergeant

Bård Ludvig Thorheim (born 15 October 1976) is a Norwegian politician, researcher and former diplomat from the Conservative Party. He has been a member of parliament for Nordland since 2021.

== Political career ==
=== Early years ===
Thorheim served as the vice chair of the Students' League of the Conservative Party between 1997 and 1999, while concurrently serving as the co-editor of the Dialog journal, which was later merged with Minerva.

=== Solberg government ===
Thorheim served as a political advisor to the foreign ministers Børge Brende and Ine Eriksen Søreide between 2016 and 2019 during the government of Erna Solberg.

=== Parliament ===
He was elected representative to the Storting from the constituency of Nordland at the 2021 election.

In parliament, he currently sits on the Standing Committee on Energy and the Environment and the Election Committee.

== Diplomatic career ==
Thorheim worked within diplomacy between 2005 and 2016. He began as a trainee at the Department of Security Policy and the High North at the Ministry of Foreign Affairs until 2008. For the next two years, he worked as the first secretary at the Norwegian embassy in Colombo, Sri Lanka before moving to the same position at the embassy in Washington, D.C. After two years in Washington D. C., he returned to the Ministry of Foreign Affairs, serving as an advisor at the Section for Peace and Reconciliation until 2015. That year he became the head of the Foreign Service Response Centre, a position he held until he was appointed advisor to the foreign minister in 2016.

== Civic career ==
Aside from his diplomatic career, Thorheim has also been a guest researcher at the High North Centre at Nord University.

== Personal life ==
Thorheim hails from Bodø.

=== Education ===
He has a graduate degree in political science and attended the Norwegian Defence University College between 1999 and 2000. As a part of his national service in the Norwegian Army, he also undertook army sergeant training in 1995.
