= Nils Mjaavatn =

Norwegian politician

Nils Kristian Nilsen Mjaavatn (17 August 1883 – 19 October 1951) was a Norwegian farmer, teacher and politician for the Agrarian Party.

He was born in Vefsn Municipality as a son of farmers Nils Mjaavatn (1849–1887) and Olianna Mathisen (1850–1947). He attended basic school and folk high school in Vefsn, before graduating from Sandvik Agricultural School in 1906 and Elverum Teachers' College in 1909. He moved back to Vefsn, where he worked as a teacher until 1920. In 1913 he also took over the family farm Mjåvatn.

He served as deputy mayor of Vefsn municipal council from 1914 to 1916, mayor from 1920 to 1925 and later councilman for two terms. In 1927 he became a national board member of the Agrarian Party. He was elected to the Parliament of Norway from Nordland in 1927, 1930, 1933 and 1936.

He was a supervisory council member of the Bank of Norway from 1938 to 1945, except for a period during the occupation of Norway by Nazi Germany when he was deposed. He was also supervisor of the Nordland Line for 25 years, but was deposed here as well. He was also a board member of the Norwegian Forest Owners Association, Helgeland Forest Owners Association, Nes Trælastbrug and Vefsn Sparebank; supervisory council member of the Norwegian Industrial Bank (deputy), Norges Kreditforening for Land- og Skogbruk and Nationen.
