= Eirik Sivertsen =

Norwegian politician

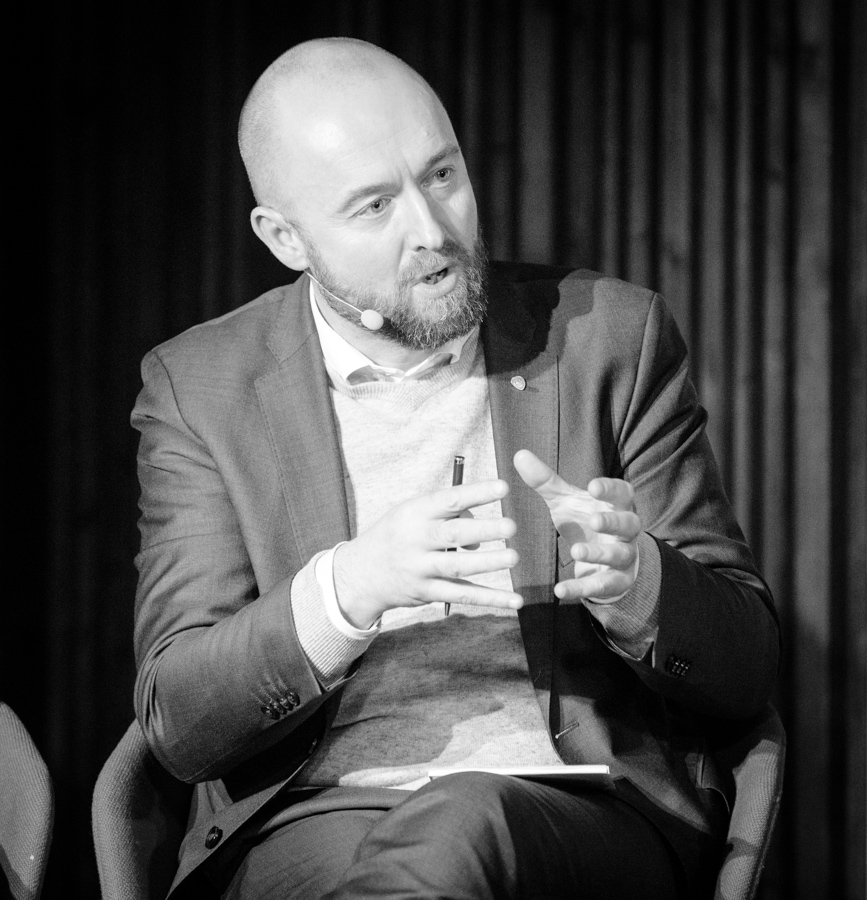
Eirik Sivertsen in 2018

Eirik Sivertsen (born 17 March 1971) is a Norwegian politician who represents Arbeiderpartiet. He has been the leader of Bodø Arbeiderpartiet since August 2006. At the 2009 Norwegian parliamentary election, Sivertsen was the party's third candidate in Nordland.

Since the municipal elections in 2007, he has been a full-time politician, as leader of the Planning, Business and Environment committee in Bodø Municipality. Sivertsen previously worked at the quality coordinator at Bodø University College.
