= Edmund Fjærvoll =

Norwegian politician

Edmund Fjærvoll (20 March 1910 – 15 January 1975) was a Norwegian politician for the Christian Democratic Party.

He was born in Bø Municipality in Vesterålen, Norway.

He was elected to the Norwegian Parliament from Nordland in 1961, and was elected again in 1969 after serving as a deputy representative since 1965. He had previously been a deputy representative in the periods 1958–1961.

He was the mayor of Hadsel Municipality during the periods 1959–1961 and 1963–1967.

Edmund Fjærvoll is the father of Dag Jostein Fjærvoll, who later became government minister, representing the same political party.
