= Erling Johan Vindenes =

Norwegian politician

Erling Johan Vindenes (30 September 1900 – 29 July 1984) is a Norwegian politician for the Liberal Party.

He was born in Nordfolden-Kjerringø.

He was elected to the Norwegian Parliament from Nordland in 1950, and was re-elected on two occasions. He had previously served in the position of deputy representative during the term 1945–1949.

Vindenes was a member of Nordfold municipality council from 1925 to 1928 and served as mayor in 1931–1934, 1934–1937, 1937–1942, 1945–1947 and 1947–1951. He later became mayor of Steigen municipality in 1966–1967. He was also a member of Nordland county council from 1931 to 1942 and 1945 to 1951.
