= Odd Eriksen =

Norwegian politician (1955–2023)

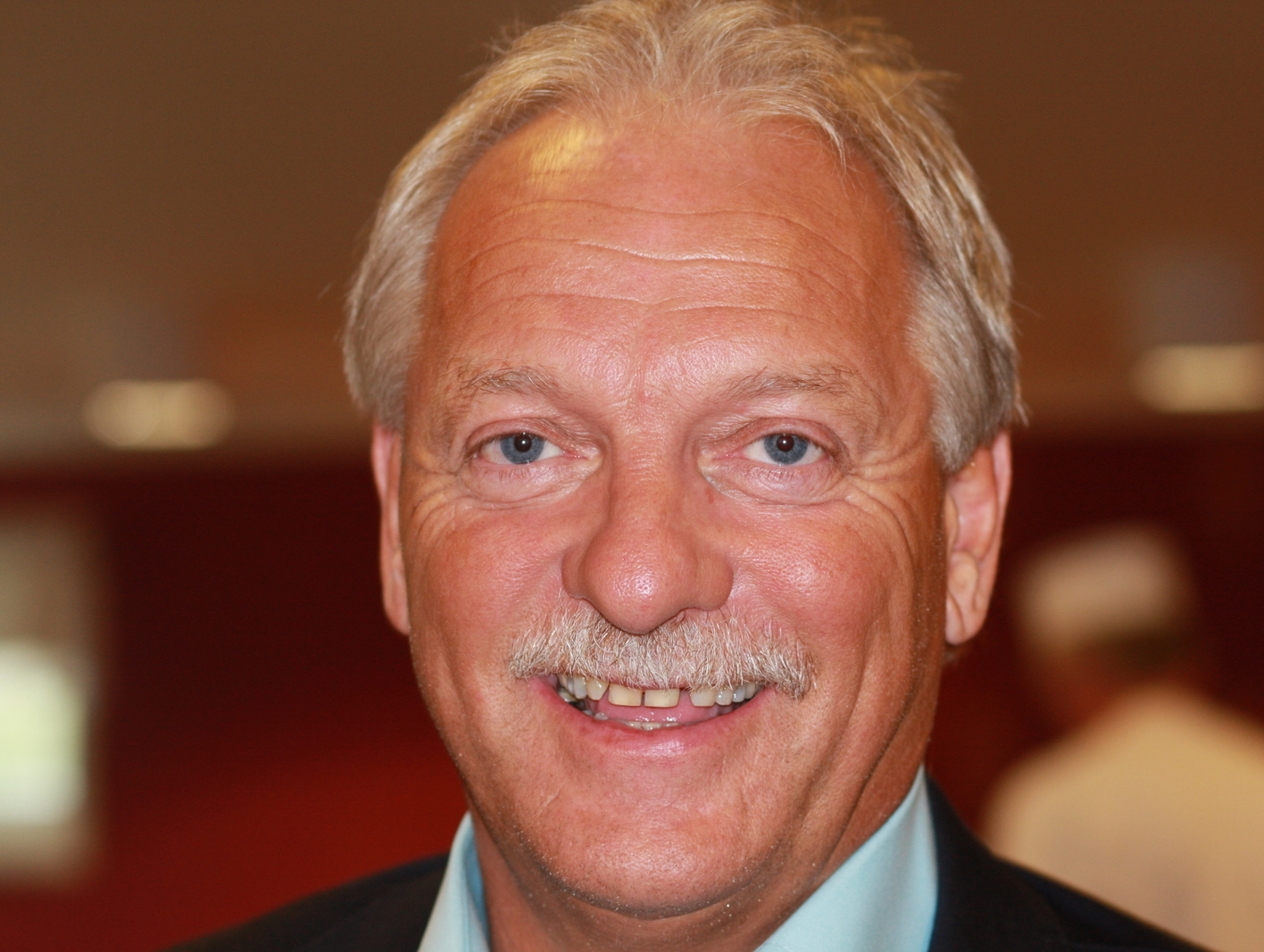

Chairman of Nordland County Municipality
- In office 6 December 2006 – 7 October 2013
- Preceded by: Geir Knutson
- Succeeded by: Tomas Norvoll

Minister of Trade and Industry
- In office 17 October 2005 – 29 September 2006
- Prime Minister: Jens Stoltenberg
- Preceded by: Børge Brende
- Succeeded by: Dag Terje Andersen

Member of the Norwegian Parliament
- In office 1 October 1993 – 30 September 2001
- Constituency: Nordland

Personal details
- Born: 11 March 1955 Alstahaug, Nordland, Norway
- Died: 11 February 2023 (aged 67)
- Party: Labour
- Children: 2
- Awards: Carnegie Medal in gold (2005); Polaris Award (2005)

Odd Eriksen (11 March 1955 – 11 February 2023) was a Norwegian trade unionist and politician for the Labour Party. In addition to his political career he gained national fame after stopping an Algerian hijacker from crashing a Kato Air-flight in 2004.

== Biography ==
Eriksen was born in Alstahaug Municipality on 11 March 1955, a son of fisherman Håkon Eriksen and Hildur Aronsen. He started his working career in 1974 at the Elkem aluminium works in Mosjøen, and was a full-time trade unionist between 1980 and 1990. From 1986 to 1990 he was leader of the local trade union, and from 1988 to 1990 also a deputy board member of the Norwegian Union of Chemical Industry Workers.

Eriksen was elected deputy representative to the Storting for the period 1989 to 1993, and ordinary representative to the Storting from 1993 to 2001. From 1993 to 1997 he was vice chairman of the Standing Committee on Defence, and a member of the Standing Committee on Local Government and Public Administration from 1997 to 2001. From 2003 to 2005 he was the counsellor of transport in Nordland County Municipality and chairman of the Labour Party's county chapter.

Eriksen became a national celebrity in 2004 after he and a fellow airline passenger stopped another passenger who had attacked the pilots of a Kato Air flight near Bodø with an axe. Eriksen himself broke his back in the fight, but managed to restrain the attacker while the badly injured pilots saved the plane from a nose dive, just 100 feet from hitting the ground. For their actions, Eriksen, his fellow passenger and the pilots received the Polaris Award from the International Federation of Air Line Pilots' Associations.

Eriksen was Minister of Trade and Industry in the Stoltenberg's Second Cabinet from 2005 to 2006, resigning from his post on 29 September 2006. He chaired the Nordland County Municipality from 2006 to 2007, and was reelected for this position for the period 2007–2013.

He died on 11 February 2023, at the age of 67, and was survived by two children and three grandchildren.
