= Jan Arild Ellingsen =

Norwegian politician

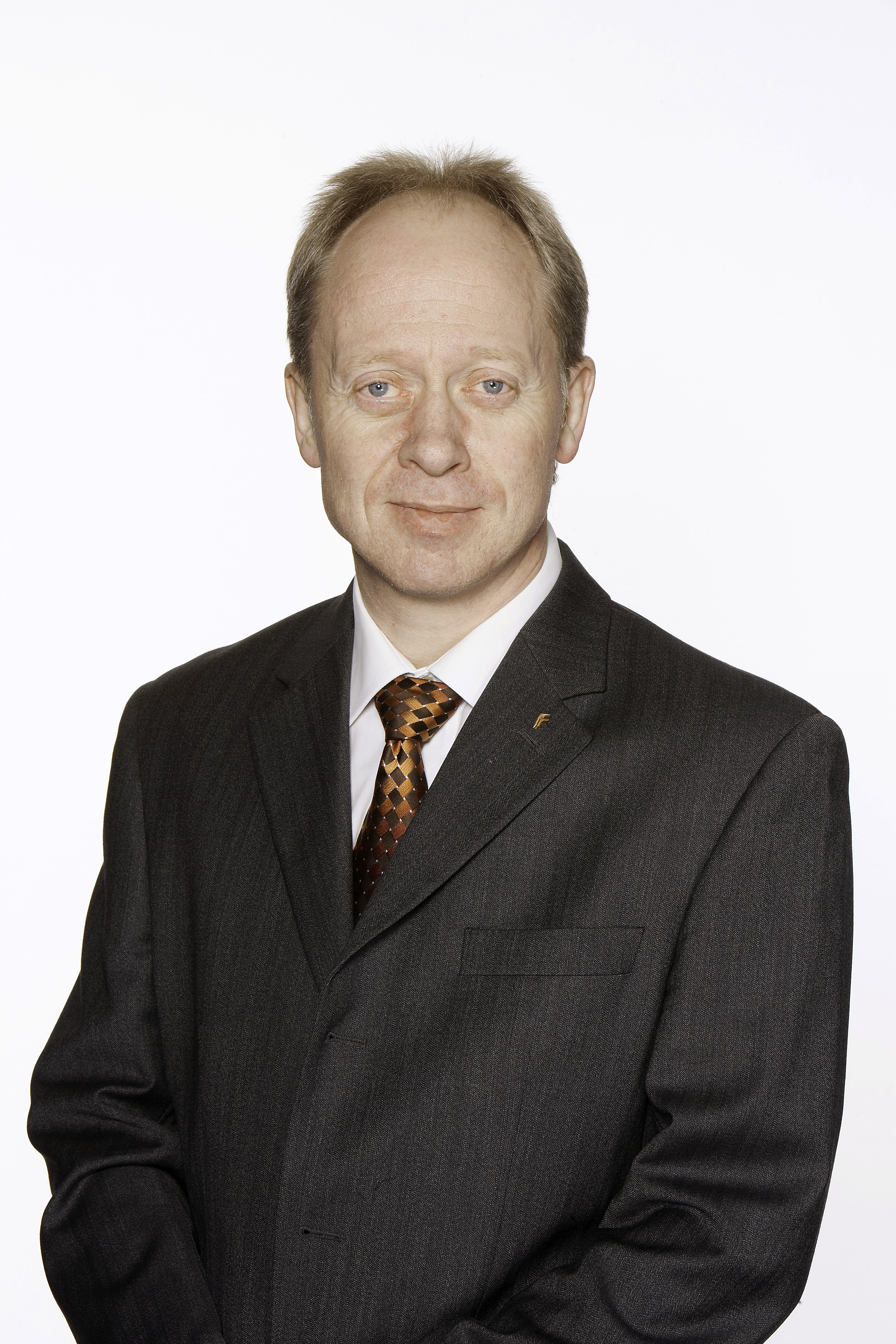
Jan Arild Ellingsen

Jan Arild Ellingsen (born 9 October 1958 in Oslo) is a Norwegian politician for the Progress Party.

He was elected to the Norwegian Parliament from Nordland in 2001, and has been re-elected on one occasion. Ellingsen is currently the Progress Party's spokesperson on matters relating to justice and crime. In 2005 Ellingsen accepted an Iraqi death sentence over a Norwegian Iraqi, drawing a sharp rebuke from fellow Progress Party MP André Kvakkestad.

In 2016, Ellingsen applauded the establishment of Soldiers of Odin, an anti immigration group, saying they should be "praised". Government and party leaders quickly distanced themselves from his comments, stating public security to be the responsibility of the police.

Ellingsen was a member of the municipal council of Saltdal Municipality from 1991 to 2003. From 1995 to 2001 he was also a member of Nordland county council.
