= Tomas Norvoll =

Norwegian politician (born 1972)

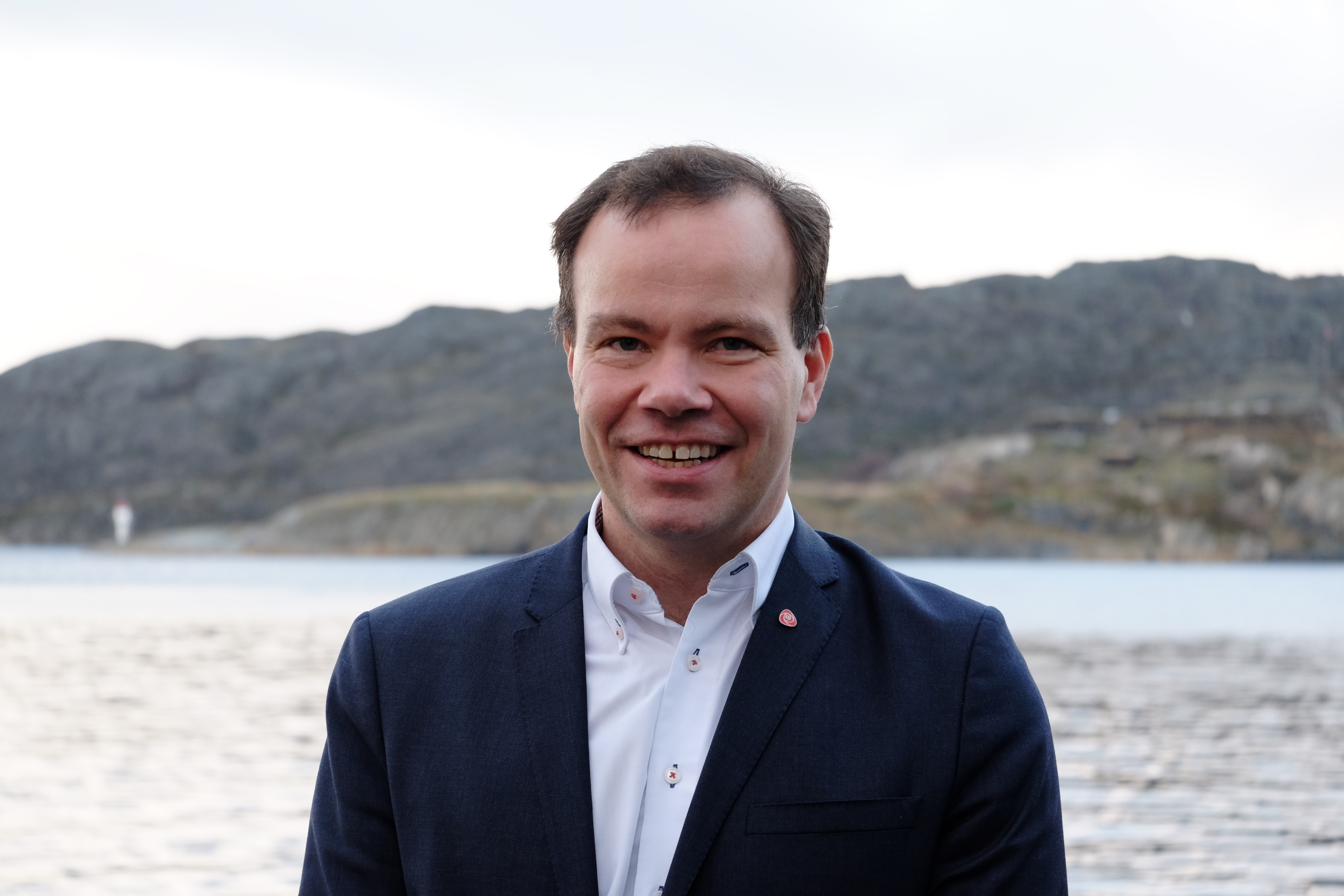

Chairman of the Nordland County Cabinet
- In office 7 October 2013 – 2 September 2022
- Deputy: Willfred Nordlund; Svein Eggesvik
- County Mayor: Sonja Alice Steen; Kari Anne Bøkestad Andreassen
- Preceded by: Odd Eriksen
- Succeeded by: Remi Solberg

Deputy Member of the Storting
- In office 1 October 2001 – 30 September 2005
- Constituency: Nordland

Member of the Storting
- In office 1 October 1993 – 30 September 2001
- Constituency: Nordland

Personal details
- Born: 12 February 1972 (age 54) Vardø, Finnmark, Norway
- Party: Labour

Tomas Norvoll (born 12 February 1972 in Vardø) is a Norwegian politician for the Labour Party. He has served as a state secretary in the Støre government since 2022. He previously served as the chairman of the Nordland county cabinet between 2013 and 2022 and was a member of parliament for Nordland between 1993 and 2001. He had also served as deputy member between 2001 and 2005.

== Political career ==
=== Parliament ===
He was elected to the Norwegian Parliament from Nordland in 1993 and served until 2001. He was only 21 years of age at the time of his election and was re-elected in 1997. He later served as deputy representative between 2001 and 2005.

Between 1993 and 2001, he sat on the Standing Committee on Education, Research and Church Affairs in parliament. He didn't sit on any committees while serving as a deputy representative.

=== Local politics ===
Norvoll was a deputy member to the municipal council for Andøy Municipality between 1991 and 1995. He was also a member of the Nordland County Council between 2011 and 2015, during which he also served as the Labour Party's group leader and led the Municipal Committee on Planning and the Economy.

Norvoll was appointed as chairman of the Nordland County Cabinet on 7 October 2013, following Odd Eriksen's resignation following a sex scandal. He retained Eriksen's cabinet, a coalition consisting of the Labour Party, Conservative Party and the Christian Democratic Party. The Conservative Party withdrew from the coalition in April 2015 and Norvoll continued to govern with the Christian Democratic Party, with support from the Centre Party and Socialist Left Party. Norvoll was elected to a term in his own right following the 2015 local elections, with the Centre Party and Socialist Left Party joining his cabinet. Norvoll secured a second term following the 2019 local elections and maintained his coalition cabinet.

In September 2022, Norvoll resigned as chairman of the county cabinet when he was appointed state secretary to the Minister of Labour and Social Inclusion, Marte Mjøs Persen. His deputy, Svein Eggesvik, served as acting chairman until Remi Solberg was appointed as Norvoll's permanent successor.

=== Government ===
He was appointed as a state secretary to the Minister of Labour and Social Inclusion, Marte Mjøs Persen, on 2 September 2022. He was briefly retained by her successor, Tonje Brenna, when she was appointed on 16 October 2023. On 1 December, Norvoll was transferred to be state secretary to the Minister of Digitalisation and Public Governance, Karianne Tung.
