= Dag Jostein Fjærvoll =

Norwegian politician (1947–2021)

Minister of Transport and Communications
- In office 15 March 1999 – 17 March 2000
- Prime Minister: Kjell Magne Bondevik
- Preceded by: Odd Einar Dørum
- Succeeded by: Terje Moe Gustavsen

Minister of Defence
- In office 17 October 1997 – 15 March 1999
- Prime Minister: Kjell Magne Bondevik
- Preceded by: Jørgen Kosmo
- Succeeded by: Eldbjørg Løwer

Member of the Norwegian Parliament
- In office 1 October 1985 – 30 September 1997
- Constituency: Nordland

Vice President of the Odelsting
- In office 11 October 1993 – 30 September 1997
- President: Gunnar Skaug
- Preceded by: Tora Aasland
- Succeeded by: Jorunn Ringstad

Vice President of the Lagting
- In office 10 October 1989 – 30 September 1993
- President: Hans J. Røsjorde
- Preceded by: Sigurd Verdal
- Succeeded by: Magnar Sortåsløkken

Personal details
- Born: 20 January 1947 Hadsel, Nordland, Norway
- Died: 5 February 2021 (aged 74)
- Party: Christian Democratic

Dag Jostein Fjærvoll (20 January 1947 – 5 February 2021) was a Norwegian politician for the Christian Democratic Party. He served as Minister of Defence from 1997 to 1999, and Minister of Transport and Communications from 1999 to 2000.

His father Edmund Fjærvoll was also a member of Parliament.

He died sixteen days after his 74th birthday.

Political offices
Preceded by Odd Einar Dørum	Norwegian Minister of Transport and Communications; 1999–2000	Succeeded by Terje Moe Gustavsen
Preceded by Jørgen Kosmo	Norwegian Minister of Defence; 1997–1999	Succeeded by Eldbjørg Løwer
