= Buskerud (Storting constituency) =

Constituency of the Storting, the national legislature of Norway

- Constituency for the Storting
- Location of Buskerud within Norway
- County: Buskerud
- Population: 271,428 (2025)
- Electorate: 194,805 (2025)
- Area: 14,694 km^{2} (2025)

Current constituency
- Created: 1921
- Seats: List: 7 (2021–present); 8 (2005–2021); 7 (1953–2005); 5 (1921–1953)
- Members of the Storting: List: Sandra Bruflot (H); Jon Engen-Helgheim (FrP); Masud Gharahkhani (Ap); Morgan Langfeldt (FrP); Kathy Lie (SV); Even A. Røed (Ap); Solveig Vestenfor (Ap); Morten Wold (FrP)
- Created from: List: Buskerud; Hallingdal; Numedal; Ringerike

Buskerud is one of the 19 multi-member constituencies of the Storting, the national legislature of Norway. The constituency was established in 1921 following the introduction of proportional representation for elections to the Storting. It is conterminous with the county of Buskerud. The constituency currently elects seven of the 169 members of the Storting using the open party-list proportional representation electoral system. At the 2025 parliamentary election it had 194,805 registered electors.

== Electoral system ==
Buskerud currently elects seven of the 169 members of the Storting using the open (Note: Although technically elections to the Storting have open lists, they are in effect closed lists as a majority of those voting for a party must make changes to the lists for the changes to take effect, which has never happened since the introduction of proportional representation in 1921, and as result candidates are elected in the order submitted by the party.) party-list proportional representation electoral system. Constituency seats are allocated by the County Electoral Committee using the Modified Sainte-Laguë method. Compensatory seats (seats at large or levelling seats) are calculated based on the national vote and are allocated by the National Electoral Committee using the Modified Sainte-Laguë method at the constituency level (one for each constituency). Only parties that reach the 4% national threshold compete for compensatory seats.

== Election results ==
=== Summary ===
Election	Communists K			Reds R / RV / FMS			Socialist Left SV / SF			Labour Ap			Greens MDG			Centre Sp / Bp / L			Liberals V			Christian Democrats KrF			Conservatives H			Progress FrP / ALP		
Election	Votes	%	Seats	Votes	%	Seats	Votes	%	Seats	Votes	%	Seats	Votes	%	Seats	Votes	%	Seats	Votes	%	Seats	Votes	%	Seats	Votes	%	Seats	Votes	%	Seats
2025				6,110	4.05%	0	6,572	4.36%	0	44,347	29.39%	3	5,383	3.57%	0	8,353	5.54%	0	4,644	3.08%	0	4,280	2.84%	0	23,109	15.31%	1	41,658	27.61%	3
2021				4,941	3.45%	0	8,062	5.64%	0	40,575	28.36%	3	4,251	2.97%	0	23,068	16.12%	1	5,207	3.64%	0	3,319	2.32%	0	31,544	22.05%	2	17,509	12.24%	1
2017				2,260	1.48%	0	7,642	5.01%	0	43,143	28.27%	3	4,112	2.69%	0	16,446	10.78%	1	5,604	3.67%	0	3,995	2.62%	0	41,011	26.88%	2	26,419	17.31%	2
2013				905	0.60%	0	4,094	2.73%	0	47,572	31.75%	3	3,345	2.23%	0	9,110	6.08%	0	6,913	4.61%	0	4,863	3.25%	0	43,515	29.05%	3	27,854	18.59%	2
2009	99	0.07%	0	884	0.62%	0	6,514	4.58%	0	52,751	37.08%	4	407	0.29%	0	8,842	6.22%	0	4,324	3.04%	0	4,500	3.16%	0	27,588	19.39%	2	35,764	25.14%	2
2005	107	0.08%	0	909	0.65%	0	10,201	7.28%	1	50,688	36.20%	4	169	0.12%	0	8,926	6.37%	0	7,185	5.13%	0	6,116	4.37%	0	21,106	15.07%	1	33,697	24.06%	2
2001	125	0.09%	0	699	0.52%	0	15,581	11.61%	1	36,870	27.47%	2	179	0.13%	0	7,519	5.60%	0	3,551	2.65%	0	12,072	8.99%	1	32,975	24.57%	2	21,773	16.22%	1
1997	136	0.10%	0	948	0.68%	0	6,515	4.69%	0	56,913	40.94%	4	238	0.17%	0	10,692	7.69%	0	3,814	2.74%	0	13,217	9.51%	1	22,152	15.93%	1	23,907	17.20%	1
1993				553	0.42%	0	8,762	6.59%	0	56,789	42.74%	4				19,660	14.80%	1	3,252	2.45%	0	6,968	5.24%	0	24,307	18.29%	2	10,375	7.81%	0
1989				645	0.45%	0	10,815	7.53%	0	56,852	39.59%	4	532	0.37%	0	8,694	6.05%	0	2,914	2.03%	0	7,257	5.05%	0	34,987	24.36%	2	20,013	13.94%	1
1985	253	0.18%	0	395	0.28%	0	4,210	2.98%	0	65,404	46.31%	4				9,410	6.66%	1	2,840	2.01%	0	6,612	4.68%	0	46,139	32.67%	2	5,252	3.72%	0
1981	123	0.11%	0	252	0.22%	0	2,843	2.50%	0	52,397	46.09%	4				13,631	11.99%	1				3,703	3.26%	0	36,572	32.17%	2	4,032	3.55%	0
1977	589	0.47%	0	377	0.30%	0	5,111	4.07%	0	62,108	49.46%	4				11,750	9.36%	0				12,098	9.63%	1	31,159	24.82%	2	2,030	1.62%	0
1973				373	0.32%	0	14,560	12.45%	1	49,744	42.53%	3				11,998	10.26%	1	1,652	1.41%	0	8,594	7.35%	0	23,188	19.83%	2	4,771	4.08%	0
1969	1,287	1.10%	0				6,179	5.30%	0	61,111	52.42%	4				12,230	10.49%	1	4,582	3.93%	0	5,104	4.38%	0	26,096	22.38%	2			
1965	1,811	1.62%	0				8,403	7.52%	0	56,798	50.82%	4				11,943	10.69%	1	3,801	3.40%	0	5,534	4.95%	0	23,473	21.00%	2			
1961	4,000	4.26%	0							52,696	56.15%	4				9,308	9.92%	1	2,522	2.69%	0	5,429	5.79%	0	19,888	21.19%	2			
1957	4,392	4.80%	0							51,613	56.39%	4				9,608	10.50%	1	2,229	2.44%	0	5,797	6.33%	0	17,886	19.54%	2			
1953	6,548	7.14%	0							49,564	54.02%	4				9,668	10.54%	1	2,187	2.38%	0	5,551	6.05%	0	18,227	19.87%	2			
1949	5,963	9.00%	0							34,522	52.08%	3				11,425	17.24%	1				3,910	5.90%	0	10,381	15.66%	1			
1945	9,281	16.30%	1							27,922	49.05%	3				6,118	10.75%	0	2,484	4.36%	0	0	0.00%	0	11,119	19.53%	1			
1936										28,957	54.58%	3													23,267	43.86%	2			
1933	407	0.86%	0							24,702	52.07%	3				6,907	14.56%	1	3,312	6.98%	0				10,951	23.09%	1			
1930	438	0.97%	0							19,957	44.12%	2				7,288	16.11%	1	3,866	8.55%	0				13,681	30.25%	2			
1927	809	1.97%	0							19,762	48.09%	3				6,194	15.07%	1	3,752	9.13%	0				10,577	25.74%	1			
1924	1,559	3.97%	0							12,654	32.25%	2				5,286	13.47%	1	3,492	8.90%	0				13,700	34.91%	2			
1921										12,060	32.72%	2				3,696	10.03%	0	4,001	10.86%	0				14,951	40.57%	3			

(Excludes compensatory seats. Figures in italics represent joint lists.)

=== Detailed ===
==== 2020s ====
===== 2025 =====
Results of the 2025 parliamentary election held on 8 September 2025:

Party		Votes	%	Seats		
Party		Votes	%	Con.	Com.	Tot.
Labour Party	Ap	44,347	29.39%	3	0	3
Progress Party	FrP	41,658	27.61%	3	0	3
Conservative Party	H	23,109	15.31%	1	0	1
Centre Party	Sp	8,353	5.54%	0	0	0
Socialist Left Party	SV	6,572	4.36%	0	1	1
Red Party	R	6,110	4.05%	0	0	0
Green Party	MDG	5,383	3.57%	0	0	0
Liberal Party	V	4,644	3.08%	0	0	0
Christian Democratic Party	KrF	4,280	2.84%	0	0	0
Norway Democrats	ND	1,362	0.90%	0	0	0
Pensioners' Party	PP	1,107	0.73%	0	0	0
Generation Party	GP	1,035	0.69%	0	0	0
Industry and Business Party	INP	870	0.58%	0	0	0
Conservative	K	615	0.41%	0	0	0
Center Party	PS	534	0.35%	0	0	0
Peace and Justice	FOR	406	0.27%	0	0	0
DNI Party	DNI	264	0.17%	0	0	0
Welfare and Innovation Party	VIP	255	0.17%	0	0	0
Valid votes		150,904	100.00%	7	1	8
Blank votes		1,400	0.92%			
Rejected votes – other		291	0.19%			
Total polled		152,595	78.33%			
Registered electors		194,805				

The following candidates were elected:

- Constituency seats - Jon Engen-Helgheim (FrP); Masud Gharahkhani (Ap); Trond Helleland (H); Morgan Langfeldt (FrP); Even A. Røed (Ap); Solveig Vestenfor (Ap); and Morten Wold (FrP).
- Compensatory seat - Kathy Lie (SV).

===== 2021 =====
Results of the 2021 parliamentary election held on 13 September 2021:

Party		Votes	%	Seats		
Party		Votes	%	Con.	Com.	Tot.
Labour Party	Ap	40,575	28.36%	3	0	3
Conservative Party	H	31,544	22.05%	2	0	2
Centre Party	Sp	23,068	16.12%	1	0	1
Progress Party	FrP	17,509	12.24%	1	0	1
Socialist Left Party	SV	8,062	5.64%	0	1	1
Liberal Party	V	5,207	3.64%	0	0	0
Red Party	R	4,941	3.45%	0	0	0
Green Party	MDG	4,251	2.97%	0	0	0
Christian Democratic Party	KrF	3,319	2.32%	0	0	0
Democrats in Norway		1,976	1.38%	0	0	0
Pensioners' Party	PP	520	0.36%	0	0	0
Center Party		440	0.31%	0	0	0
Health Party		421	0.29%	0	0	0
The Christians	PDK	330	0.23%	0	0	0
Industry and Business Party	INP	275	0.19%	0	0	0
Capitalist Party		244	0.17%	0	0	0
Alliance - Alternative for Norway		147	0.10%	0	0	0
People's Action No to More Road Tolls	FNB	126	0.09%	0	0	0
Pirate Party of Norway		115	0.08%	0	0	0
Valid votes		143,070	100.00%	7	1	8
Blank votes		1,028	0.71%			
Rejected votes – other		189	0.13%			
Total polled		144,287	75.29%			
Registered electors		191,637				

The following candidates were elected:

- Constituency seats - Sandra Bruflot (H); Lise Christoffersen (Ap); Masud Gharahkhani (Ap); Trond Helleland (H); Per Olaf Lundteigen (Sp); Even A. Røed (Ap); and Morten Wold (FrP).
- Compensatory seat - Kathy Lie (SV).

==== 2010s ====
===== 2017 =====
Results of the 2017 parliamentary election held on 11 September 2017:

Party		Votes	%	Seats		
Party		Votes	%	Con.	Com.	Tot.
Labour Party	Ap	43,143	28.27%	3	0	3
Conservative Party	H	41,011	26.88%	2	0	2
Progress Party	FrP	26,419	17.31%	2	0	2
Centre Party	Sp	16,446	10.78%	1	0	1
Socialist Left Party	SV	7,642	5.01%	0	1	1
Liberal Party	V	5,604	3.67%	0	0	0
Green Party	MDG	4,112	2.69%	0	0	0
Christian Democratic Party	KrF	3,995	2.62%	0	0	0
Red Party	R	2,260	1.48%	0	0	0
Health Party		855	0.56%	0	0	0
Capitalist Party		318	0.21%	0	0	0
The Christians	PDK	275	0.18%	0	0	0
The Alliance		221	0.14%	0	0	0
Democrats in Norway		201	0.13%	0	0	0
Coastal Party	KP	91	0.06%	0	0	0
Valid votes		152,593	100.00%	8	1	9
Blank votes		1,045	0.68%			
Rejected votes – other		288	0.19%			
Total polled		153,926	77.46%			
Registered electors		198,720				

The following candidates were elected:

- Constituency seats - Lise Christoffersen (Ap); Jon Engen-Helgheim (FrP); Masud Gharahkhani (Ap); Trond Helleland (H); Kristin Ørmen Johnsen (H); Martin Kolberg (Ap); Per Olaf Lundteigen (Sp); and Morten Wold (FrP).
- Compensatory seat - Arne Nævra (SV).

===== 2013 =====
Results of the 2013 parliamentary election held on 8 and 9 September 2013:

Party		Votes	%	Seats		
Party		Votes	%	Con.	Com.	Tot.
Labour Party	Ap	47,572	31.75%	3	0	3
Conservative Party	H	43,515	29.05%	3	0	3
Progress Party	FrP	27,854	18.59%	2	0	2
Centre Party	Sp	9,110	6.08%	0	1	1
Liberal Party	V	6,913	4.61%	0	0	0
Christian Democratic Party	KrF	4,863	3.25%	0	0	0
Socialist Left Party	SV	4,094	2.73%	0	0	0
Green Party	MDG	3,345	2.23%	0	0	0
Red Party	R	905	0.60%	0	0	0
The Christians	PDK	736	0.49%	0	0	0
Pirate Party of Norway		508	0.34%	0	0	0
Coastal Party	KP	135	0.09%	0	0	0
Christian Unity Party	KSP	125	0.08%	0	0	0
Democrats in Norway		80	0.05%	0	0	0
Society Party		56	0.04%	0	0	0
Valid votes		149,811	100.00%	8	1	9
Blank votes		817	0.54%			
Rejected votes – other		289	0.19%			
Total polled		150,917	78.03%			
Registered electors		193,404				

The following candidates were elected:

- Constituency seats - Lise Christoffersen (Ap); Trond Helleland (H); Kristin Ørmen Johnsen (H); Martin Kolberg (Ap); Torgeir Micaelsen (Ap); Jørund Rytman (FrP); Anders B. Werp (H); and Morten Wold (FrP).
- Compensatory seat - Per Olaf Lundteigen (Sp).

==== 2000s ====
===== 2009 =====
Results of the 2009 parliamentary election held on 13 and 14 September 2009:

Party		Votes	%	Seats		
Party		Votes	%	Con.	Com.	Tot.
Labour Party	Ap	52,751	37.08%	4	0	4
Progress Party	FrP	35,764	25.14%	2	0	2
Conservative Party	H	27,588	19.39%	2	0	2
Centre Party	Sp	8,842	6.22%	0	1	1
Socialist Left Party	SV	6,514	4.58%	0	0	0
Christian Democratic Party	KrF	4,500	3.16%	0	0	0
Liberal Party	V	4,324	3.04%	0	0	0
Red Party	R	884	0.62%	0	0	0
Green Party	MDG	407	0.29%	0	0	0
Christian Unity Party	KSP	202	0.14%	0	0	0
Vigrid		179	0.13%	0	0	0
Coastal Party	KP	109	0.08%	0	0	0
Communist Party of Norway	K	99	0.07%	0	0	0
Democrats in Norway		86	0.06%	0	0	0
Valid votes		142,249	100.00%	8	1	9
Blank votes		652	0.46%			
Rejected votes – other		55	0.04%			
Total polled		142,956	76.02%			
Registered electors		188,044				

The following candidates were elected:

- Constituency seats - Lise Christoffersen (Ap); Laila Gustavsen (Ap); Trond Helleland (H); Martin Kolberg (Ap); Ulf Erik Knudsen (FrP); Torgeir Micaelsen (Ap); Jørund Rytman (FrP); and Anders B. Werp (H).
- Compensatory seat - Per Olaf Lundteigen (Sp).

===== 2005 =====
Results of the 2005 parliamentary election held on 11 and 12 September 2005:

Party		Votes	%	Seats		
Party		Votes	%	Con.	Com.	Tot.
Labour Party	Ap	50,688	36.20%	4	0	4
Progress Party	FrP	33,697	24.06%	2	0	2
Conservative Party	H	21,106	15.07%	1	0	1
Socialist Left Party	SV	10,201	7.28%	1	0	1
Centre Party	Sp	8,926	6.37%	0	1	1
Liberal Party	V	7,185	5.13%	0	0	0
Christian Democratic Party	KrF	6,116	4.37%	0	0	0
Red Electoral Alliance	RV	909	0.65%	0	0	0
Pensioners' Party	PP	481	0.34%	0	0	0
Coastal Party	KP	340	0.24%	0	0	0
Green Party	MDG	169	0.12%	0	0	0
Communist Party of Norway	K	107	0.08%	0	0	0
Democrats		106	0.08%	0	0	0
Valid votes		140,031	100.00%	8	1	9
Blank votes		501	0.36%			
Rejected votes – other		78	0.06%			
Total polled		140,610	77.29%			
Registered electors		181,932				

The following candidates were elected:

- Constituency seats - Magnar Lund Bergo (SV); Lise Christoffersen (Ap); Sigrun Eng (Ap); Trond Helleland (H); Thorbjørn Jagland (Ap); Ulf Erik Knudsen (FrP); Torgeir Micaelsen (Ap); and Jørund Rytman (FrP).
- Compensatory seat - Per Olaf Lundteigen (Sp).

===== 2001 =====
Results of the 2001 parliamentary election held on 9 and 10 September 2001:

Party		Votes	%	Seats		
Party		Votes	%	Con.	Com.	Tot.
Labour Party	Ap	36,870	27.47%	2	0	2
Conservative Party	H	32,975	24.57%	2	0	2
Progress Party	FrP	21,773	16.22%	1	0	1
Socialist Left Party	SV	15,581	11.61%	1	0	1
Christian Democratic Party	KrF	12,072	8.99%	1	0	1
Centre Party	Sp	7,519	5.60%	0	0	0
Liberal Party	V	3,551	2.65%	0	0	0
The Political Party	DPP	1,326	0.99%	0	0	0
Coastal Party	KP	837	0.62%	0	0	0
Red Electoral Alliance	RV	699	0.52%	0	0	0
Christian Unity Party	KSP	238	0.18%	0	0	0
Green Party	MDG	179	0.13%	0	0	0
Fatherland Party	FLP	173	0.13%	0	0	0
Communist Party of Norway	K	125	0.09%	0	0	0
Norwegian People's Party	NFP	113	0.08%	0	0	0
Non-Partisan Coastal and Rural District Party		100	0.07%	0	0	0
Social Democrats		87	0.06%	0	0	0
Valid votes		134,218	100.00%	7	0	7
Rejected votes		1,047	0.77%			
Total polled		135,265	75.18%			
Registered electors		179,912				

The following candidates were elected:

- Constituency seats - Magnar Lund Bergo (SV); Sigrun Eng (Ap); Trond Helleland (H); Beate Heieren Hundhammer (H); Thorbjørn Jagland (Ap); Ulf Erik Knudsen (FrP); and Finn Kristian Marthinsen (KrF).

==== 1990s ====
===== 1997 =====
Results of the 1997 parliamentary election held on 15 September 1997:

Party		Votes	%	Seats		
Party		Votes	%	Con.	Com.	Tot.
Labour Party	Ap	56,913	40.94%	4	0	4
Progress Party	FrP	23,907	17.20%	1	0	1
Conservative Party	H	22,152	15.93%	1	0	1
Christian Democratic Party	KrF	13,217	9.51%	1	0	1
Centre Party	Sp	10,692	7.69%	0	0	0
Socialist Left Party	SV	6,515	4.69%	0	0	0
Liberal Party	V	3,814	2.74%	0	0	0
Red Electoral Alliance	RV	948	0.68%	0	0	0
Green Party	MDG	238	0.17%	0	0	0
Fatherland Party	FLP	168	0.12%	0	0	0
Natural Law Party		140	0.10%	0	0	0
Communist Party of Norway	K	136	0.10%	0	0	0
White Electoral Alliance		133	0.10%	0	0	0
Liberal People's Party	DLF	48	0.03%	0	0	0
Valid votes		139,021	100.00%	7	0	7
Rejected votes		707	0.51%			
Total polled		139,728	79.20%			
Registered electors		176,425				

The following candidates were elected:

- Constituency seats - Erik Dalheim (Ap); Sigrun Eng (Ap); Kirsti Kolle Grøndahl (Ap); Trond Helleland (H); Thorbjørn Jagland (Ap); Ulf Erik Knudsen (FrP); and Finn Kristian Marthinsen (KrF).

===== 1993 =====
Results of the 1993 parliamentary election held on 12 and 13 September 1993:

Party		Votes	%	Seats		
Party		Votes	%	Con.	Com.	Tot.
Labour Party	Ap	56,789	42.74%	4	0	4
Conservative Party	H	24,307	18.29%	2	0	2
Centre Party	Sp	19,660	14.80%	1	0	1
Progress Party	FrP	10,375	7.81%	0	1	1
Socialist Left Party	SV	8,762	6.59%	0	0	0
Christian Democratic Party	KrF	6,968	5.24%	0	0	0
Liberal Party	V	3,252	2.45%	0	0	0
Stop Immigration	SI	1,059	0.80%	0	0	0
Red Electoral Alliance	RV	553	0.42%	0	0	0
New Future Coalition Party	SNF	355	0.27%	0	0	0
Fatherland Party	FLP	352	0.26%	0	0	0
Natural Law Party		196	0.15%	0	0	0
Freedom Party against the EU		129	0.10%	0	0	0
Common Future		58	0.04%	0	0	0
Liberal People's Party	DLF	56	0.04%	0	0	0
Valid votes		132,871	100.00%	7	1	8
Rejected votes		775	0.58%			
Total polled		133,646	76.86%			
Registered electors		173,890				

The following candidates were elected:

- Constituency seats - Hallgrim Berg (H); Erik Dalheim (Ap); Sigrun Eng (Ap); Kirsti Kolle Grøndahl (Ap); Arild Hiim (H); Thorbjørn Jagland (Ap); and Per Olaf Lundteigen (Sp).
- Compensatory seat - Roy Wetterstad (FrP).

==== 1980s ====
===== 1989 =====
Results of the 1989 parliamentary election held on 10 and 11 September 1989:

Party		Votes	%	Seats		
Party		Votes	%	Con.	Com.	Tot.
Labour Party	Ap	56,852	39.59%	4	0	4
Conservative Party	H	34,987	24.36%	2	0	2
Progress Party	FrP	20,013	13.94%	1	0	1
Socialist Left Party	SV	10,815	7.53%	0	0	0
Centre Party	Sp	8,694	6.05%	0	0	0
Christian Democratic Party	KrF	7,257	5.05%	0	0	0
Liberal Party	V	2,914	2.03%	0	0	0
Stop Immigration	SI	844	0.59%	0	0	0
County Lists for Environment and Solidarity	FMS	645	0.45%	0	0	0
Green Party	MDG	532	0.37%	0	0	0
Free Elected Representatives		46	0.03%	0	0	0
Valid votes		143,599	100.00%	7	0	7
Rejected votes		289	0.20%			
Total polled		143,888	84.43%			
Registered electors		170,429				

The following candidates were elected:

- Constituency seats - Hallgrim Berg (H); Erik Dalheim (Ap); Kirsti Kolle Grøndahl (Ap); Arild Hiim (H); Trond Jensrud (Ap); Åse Klundelien (Ap); and Steinar Maribo (FrP).

===== 1985 =====
Results of the 1985 parliamentary election held on 8 and 9 September 1985:

Party		Party			List Alliance		
Party		Votes	%	Seats	Votes	%	Seats
Labour Party	Ap	65,404	46.31%	4	65,404	46.46%	4
Conservative Party	H	46,139	32.67%	3	46,139	32.78%	2
Centre Party	Sp	9,410	6.66%	0	15,565	11.06%	1
Christian Democratic Party	KrF	6,612	4.68%	0	15,565	11.06%	1
Progress Party	FrP	5,252	3.72%	0	5,252	3.73%	0
Socialist Left Party	SV	4,210	2.98%	0	4,210	2.99%	0
Liberal Party	V	2,840	2.01%	0	2,840	2.02%	0
Red Electoral Alliance	RV	395	0.28%	0	395	0.28%	0
Pensioners' Party	PP	344	0.24%	0	344	0.24%	0
Liberal People's Party	DLF	312	0.22%	0	312	0.22%	0
Communist Party of Norway	K	253	0.18%	0	253	0.18%	0
Free Elected Representatives		50	0.04%	0	50	0.04%	0
Valid votes		141,221	100.00%	7	140,764	100.00%	7
Rejected votes		216	0.15%				
Total polled		141,437	85.62%				
Registered electors		165,197					

As the list alliance was entitled to more seats contesting as an alliance than it was contesting as individual parties, the distribution of seats was as list alliance votes. The Sp-KrF list alliance's additional seat was allocated to the Centre Party.

The following candidates were elected: Hallgrim Berg (H); Johan Buttedahl (Sp); Erik Dalheim (Ap); Kirsti Kolle Grøndahl (Ap); Aase Moløkken (Ap); Olaf Øen (Ap); and Mona Røkke (H).

===== 1981 =====
Results of the 1981 parliamentary election held on 13 and 14 September 1981:

Party		Votes	%	Seats
Labour Party	Ap	58,983	43.68%	3
Conservative Party	H	43,667	32.34%	3
Centre Party–Liberal Party	Sp-V	11,825	8.76%	1
Christian Democratic Party	KrF	7,376	5.46%	0
Progress Party	FrP	6,409	4.75%	0
Socialist Left Party	SV	5,315	3.94%	0
Red Electoral Alliance	RV	502	0.37%	0
Communist Party of Norway	K	490	0.36%	0
Liberal People's Party	DLF	373	0.28%	0
Plebiscite Party		51	0.04%	0
Free Elected Representatives		40	0.03%	0
Valid votes		135,031	100.00%	7
Rejected votes		242	0.18%	
Total polled		135,273	84.83%	
Registered electors		159,466		

Errors in the conduct of the election resulted in a re-run of the election on 6 and 7 December 1981:

Party		Votes	%	Seats
Labour Party	Ap	52,397	46.09%	4
Conservative Party	H	36,572	32.17%	2
Centre Party–Liberal Party	Sp-V	13,631	11.99%	1
Progress Party	FrP	4,032	3.55%	0
Christian Democratic Party	KrF	3,703	3.26%	0
Socialist Left Party	SV	2,843	2.50%	0
Red Electoral Alliance	RV	252	0.22%	0
Communist Party of Norway	K	123	0.11%	0
Liberal People's Party	DLF	72	0.06%	0
Free Elected Representatives		28	0.02%	0
Plebiscite Party		27	0.02%	0
Valid votes		113,680	100.00%	7
Rejected votes		103	0.09%	
Total polled		113,783	71.59%	
Registered electors		158,930		

The following candidates were elected: Johan Buttedahl (Sp); Erik Dalheim (Ap); Kirsti Kolle Grøndahl (Ap); Aase Moløkken (Ap); Olaf Øen (Ap); Mona Røkke (H); and Hans E. Strand (H).

==== 1970s ====
===== 1977 =====
Results of the 1977 parliamentary election held on 11 and 12 September 1977:

Party		Votes	%	Seats
Labour Party	Ap	62,108	49.46%	4
Conservative Party	H	31,159	24.82%	2
Christian Democratic Party–Liberal Party–New People's Party	KrF-V-DNF	12,098	9.63%	1
Centre Party	Sp	11,750	9.36%	0
Socialist Left Party	SV	5,111	4.07%	0
Progress Party	FrP	2,030	1.62%	0
Communist Party of Norway	K	589	0.47%	0
Red Electoral Alliance	RV	377	0.30%	0
Single Person's Party		150	0.12%	0
Norwegian Democratic Party		113	0.09%	0
Free Elected Representatives		80	0.06%	0
Valid votes		125,565	100.00%	7
Rejected votes		177	0.14%	
Total polled		125,742	84.76%	
Registered electors		148,354		

The following candidates were elected: Kirsti Kolle Grøndahl (Ap); Gunnar Thorleif Hvashovd (Ap); Olaf Øen (Ap); Tor Oftedal (Ap); Mona Røkke (H); Hans E. Strand (H); and Hans Torgersen (KrF-V-DNF).

===== 1973 =====
Results of the 1973 parliamentary election held on 9 and 10 September 1973:

Party		Votes	%	Seats
Labour Party	Ap	49,744	42.53%	3
Conservative Party	H	23,188	19.83%	2
Socialist Electoral League	SV	14,560	12.45%	1
Centre Party	Sp	11,998	10.26%	1
Christian Democratic Party	KrF	8,594	7.35%	0
Anders Lange's Party	ALP	4,771	4.08%	0
Liberal Party	V	1,652	1.41%	0
New People's Party	DNF	1,590	1.36%	0
Red Electoral Alliance	RV	373	0.32%	0
Single Person's Party		242	0.21%	0
Women's Free Elected Representatives		137	0.12%	0
Norwegian Democratic Party		112	0.10%	0
Valid votes		116,961	100.00%	7
Rejected votes		248	0.21%	
Total polled		117,209	82.28%	
Registered electors		142,454		

The following candidates were elected: Ragnar Christiansen (Ap); Kåre Øistein Hansen (SV); Gunnar Thorleif Hvashovd (Ap); Gunnar Johnsen (H); Olaf Knudson (H); Tor Oftedal (Ap); and Erland Steenberg (Sp).

==== 1960s ====
===== 1969 =====
Results of the 1969 parliamentary election held on 7 and 8 September 1969:

Party		Votes	%	Seats
Labour Party	Ap	61,111	52.42%	4
Conservative Party	H	26,096	22.38%	2
Centre Party	Sp	12,230	10.49%	1
Socialist People's Party	SF	6,179	5.30%	0
Christian Democratic Party	KrF	5,104	4.38%	0
Liberal Party	V	4,582	3.93%	0
Communist Party of Norway	K	1,287	1.10%	0
Valid votes		116,589	100.00%	7
Rejected votes		240	0.21%	
Total polled		116,829	86.66%	
Registered electors		134,816		

The following candidates were elected: Ragnar Christiansen (Ap); Gunnar Thorleif Hvashovd (Ap); Bernt Ingvaldsen (H); Guri Johannessen (Ap); Olaf Knudson (H); Tor Oftedal (Ap); and Erland Steenberg (Sp).

===== 1965 =====
Results of the 1965 parliamentary election held on 12 and 13 September 1965:

Party		Votes	%	Seats
Labour Party	Ap	56,798	50.82%	4
Conservative Party	H	23,473	21.00%	2
Centre Party	Sp	11,943	10.69%	1
Socialist People's Party	SF	8,403	7.52%	0
Christian Democratic Party	KrF	5,534	4.95%	0
Liberal Party	V	3,801	3.40%	0
Communist Party of Norway	K	1,811	1.62%	0
Valid votes		111,763	100.00%	7
Rejected votes		592	0.53%	
Total polled		112,355	89.06%	
Registered electors		126,156		

The following candidates were elected: Sverre Oddvar Andresen (Ap); Ragnar Christiansen (Ap); Bernt Ingvaldsen (H); Guri Johannessen (Ap); Olaf Knudson (H); Erland Steenberg (Sp); and Reidar Strømdahl (Ap).

===== 1961 =====
Results of the 1961 parliamentary election held on 11 September 1961:

Party		Votes	%	Seats
Labour Party	Ap	52,696	56.15%	4
Conservative Party	H	19,888	21.19%	2
Centre Party	Sp	9,308	9.92%	1
Christian Democratic Party	KrF	5,429	5.79%	0
Communist Party of Norway	K	4,000	4.26%	0
Liberal Party	V	2,522	2.69%	0
Valid votes		93,843	100.00%	7
Rejected votes		475	0.50%	
Total polled		94,318	83.30%	
Registered electors		113,224		

The following candidates were elected: Botolv Bråtalien (Sp), 9,307 votes; Ragnar Christiansen (Ap), 52,695 votes; Bernt Ingvaldsen (H), 19,885 votes; Guri Johannessen (Ap), 52,694 votes; Olaf Knudson (H), 19,888 votes; Gunnar Mykstu (Ap), 52,695 votes; and Olaf Watnebryn (Ap), 52,691 votes.

==== 1950s ====
===== 1957 =====
Results of the 1957 parliamentary election held on 7 October 1957:

Party		Votes	%	Seats
Labour Party	Ap	51,613	56.39%	4
Conservative Party	H	17,886	19.54%	2
Farmers' Party	Bp	9,608	10.50%	1
Christian Democratic Party	KrF	5,797	6.33%	0
Communist Party of Norway	K	4,392	4.80%	0
Liberal Party	V	2,229	2.44%	0
Valid votes		91,525	100.00%	7
Rejected votes		422	0.46%	
Total polled		91,947	81.87%	
Registered electors		112,314		

The following candidates were elected: Botolv Bråtalien (Bp); Ragnar Christiansen (Ap); Bernt Ingvaldsen (H); Guri Johannessen (Ap); Olaf Knudson (H); Gunnar Mykstu (Ap); and Olaf Watnebryn (Ap).

===== 1953 =====
Results of the 1953 parliamentary election held on 12 October 1953:

Party		Votes	%	Seats
Labour Party	Ap	49,564	54.02%	4
Conservative Party	H	18,227	19.87%	2
Farmers' Party	Bp	9,668	10.54%	1
Communist Party of Norway	K	6,548	7.14%	0
Christian Democratic Party	KrF	5,551	6.05%	0
Liberal Party	V	2,187	2.38%	0
Valid votes		91,745	100.00%	7
Rejected votes		428	0.46%	
Total polled		92,173	83.09%	
Registered electors		110,930		

The following candidates were elected: Hans Oskar Evju (Bp); Bernt Ingvaldsen (H); Konrad Knudsen (Ap); Olaf Knudson (H); Astrid Skare (Ap); Olaf Sørensen (Ap); and Olaf Watnebryn (Ap).

==== 1940s ====
===== 1949 =====
Results of the 1949 parliamentary election held on 10 October 1949:

Party		Votes	%	Seats
Labour Party	Ap	34,522	52.08%	3
Farmers' Party–Liberal Party	Bp-V	11,425	17.24%	1
Conservative Party	H	10,381	15.66%	1
Communist Party of Norway	K	5,963	9.00%	0
Christian Democratic Party	KrF	3,910	5.90%	0
Society Party	Samfp	85	0.13%	0
Valid votes		66,286	100.00%	5
Rejected votes		396	0.59%	
Total polled		66,682	85.41%	
Registered electors		78,071		

The following candidates were elected: Lars Breie (Ap); Hans Oskar Evju (Bp-V); Torolv Kandahl (H); Konrad Knudsen (Ap); and Astrid Skare (Ap).

===== 1945 =====
Results of the 1945 parliamentary election held on 8 October 1945:

Party		Party			List Alliance		
Party		Votes	%	Seats	Votes	%	Seats
Labour Party	Ap	27,922	49.05%	3	27,922	49.07%	3
Buskerud Coalition Party (Conservative Party)	BS	11,119	19.53%	1	17,212	30.25%	1
Farmers' Party	Bp	6,118	10.75%	0	17,212	30.25%	1
Communist Party of Norway	K	9,281	16.30%	1	9,281	16.31%	1
Liberal Party	V	2,484	4.36%	0	2,484	4.37%	0
Valid votes		56,924	100.00%	5	56,899	100.00%	5
Rejected votes		425	0.74%				
Total polled		57,349	80.64%				
Registered electors		71,119					

As the list alliances was not entitled to more seats contesting as an alliance than it was contesting as individual parties, the distribution of seats was as party votes.

The following candidates were elected: Kittill Kristoffersen Berg (K); Lars Breie (Ap); Konrad Knudsen (Ap); Astrid Skare (Ap); and Gudbrand Bernhardsen Tandberg (BS).

==== 1930s ====
===== 1936 =====
Results of the 1936 parliamentary election held on 19 October 1936:

Party		Votes	%	Seats
Labour Party	Ap	28,957	54.58%	3
Buskerud Coalition Party (Conservative Party)–Farmers' Party–Liberal Party	BS-Bp-V	23,267	43.86%	2
Nasjonal Samling	NS	617	1.16%	0
Society Party	Samfp	213	0.40%	0
Valid votes		53,054	100.00%	5
Rejected votes		528	0.99%	
Total polled		53,582	85.65%	
Registered electors		62,560		

The following candidates were elected: Jon R. Aas (BS-Bp-V); Jens Hundseid (BS-Bp-V); Hans Johan Jensen (Ap); Konrad Knudsen (Ap); and Nils Steen (Ap).

===== 1933 =====
Results of the 1933 parliamentary election held on 16 October 1933:

Party		Party			List Alliance		
Party		Votes	%	Seats	Votes	%	Seats
Labour Party	Ap	24,702	52.07%	3	24,702	52.16%	3
Buskerud County Liberal Coalition Party (Conservative Party)	LS	10,951	23.09%	1	17,780	37.54%	2
Farmers' Party	Bp	6,907	14.56%	1	17,780	37.54%	2
Liberal Party	V	3,312	6.98%	0	3,312	6.99%	0
Nasjonal Samling–Villagers	NS-B	1,156	2.44%	0	1,156	2.44%	0
Communist Party of Norway	K	407	0.86%	0	407	0.86%	0
Wild Votes		1	0.00%	0	1	0.00%	0
Valid votes		47,436	100.00%	5	47,358	100.00%	5
Rejected votes		203	0.43%				
Total polled		47,639	80.11%				
Registered electors		59,465					

As the list alliance was not entitled to more seats contesting as an alliance than it was contesting as individual parties, the distribution of seats was as party votes.

The following candidates were elected: Jon R. Aas (LS); Christopher Hornsrud (Ap); Hans Johan Jensen (Ap); Nils Steen (Ap); and Christian Hansen Tandberg (Bp).

===== 1930 =====
Results of the 1930 parliamentary election held on 20 October 1930:

Party		Votes	%	Seats
Labour Party	Ap	19,957	44.12%	2
Buskerud County Liberal Coalition Party (Conservative Party)	LS	13,681	30.25%	2
Farmers' Party	Bp	7,288	16.11%	1
Liberal Party	V	3,866	8.55%	0
Communist Party of Norway	K	438	0.97%	0
Valid votes		45,230	100.00%	5
Rejected votes		161	0.35%	
Total polled		45,391	79.02%	
Registered electors		57,441		

The following candidates were elected: Jon R. Aas (LS); Christopher Hornsrud (Ap); Harald Saue (Bp); Nils Steen (Ap); and Ivar Engebretsen Tufte (LS).

==== 1920s ====
===== 1927 =====
Results of the 1927 parliamentary election held on 17 October 1927:

Party		Votes	%	Seats
Labour Party	Ap	19,762	48.09%	3
Buskerud County Liberal Coalition Party (Conservative Party)	LS	10,577	25.74%	1
Farmers' Party	Bp	6,194	15.07%	1
Liberal Party	V	3,752	9.13%	0
Communist Party of Norway	K	809	1.97%	0
Valid votes		41,094	100.00%	5
Rejected votes		376	0.91%	
Total polled		41,470	74.93%	
Registered electors		55,342		

The following candidates were elected: Jon R. Aas (LS); Christopher Hornsrud (Ap); Hans Johan Jensen (Ap); Harald Saue (Bp); and Nils Steen (Ap).

===== 1924 =====
Results of the 1924 parliamentary election held on 21 October 1924:

Party		Votes	%	Seats
Buskerud County Liberal Coalition Party (Conservative Party–Free-minded Liberal Party)	LS	13,700	34.91%	2
Labour Party	Ap	12,654	32.25%	2
Farmers' Party	Bp	5,286	13.47%	1
Liberal Party	V	3,492	8.90%	0
Social Democratic Labour Party of Norway	S	2,546	6.49%	0
Communist Party of Norway	K	1,559	3.97%	0
Wild Votes		4	0.01%	0
Valid votes		39,241	100.00%	5
Rejected votes		515	1.30%	
Total polled		39,756	74.55%	
Registered electors		53,326		

The following candidates were elected: Jon R. Aas (LS); Christopher Hornsrud (Ap); Kristen Christoffersen Kopseng (LS); Harald Saue (Bp); and Nils Steen (Ap).

===== 1921 =====
Results of the 1921 parliamentary election held on 24 October 1921:

Party		Votes	%	Seats
Liberal Coalition Party (Conservative Party–Free-minded Liberal Party)	LS	14,951	40.57%	3
Labour Party	Ap	12,060	32.72%	2
Liberal Party	V	4,001	10.86%	0
Norwegian Farmers' Association	L	3,696	10.03%	0
Social Democratic Labour Party of Norway	S	2,136	5.80%	0
Wild Votes		9	0.02%	0
Valid votes		36,853	100.00%	5
Rejected votes		486	1.30%	
Total polled		37,339	73.94%	
Registered electors		50,500		

The following candidates were elected: Jon R. Aas (LS); Christopher Hornsrud (Ap); Kristen Christoffersen Kopseng (LS); Eugène Olaussen (Ap); and Bernt Severinsen (LS).
