= List of members of the Storting, 2021–2025 =

List of all the members of the Storting in the period 2021 to 2025. The list includes all those initially elected to the Storting. The current Storting was elected at the 2021 Norwegian parliamentary election.

The members are listed by constituency.

== Akershus ==
- Jan Tore Sanner
- Anniken Huitfeldt (Ragnhild Male Hartviksen)
- Tone Wilhelmsen Trøen
- Sverre Myrli
- Hans Andreas Limi
- Sigbjørn Gjelsvik
- Henrik Asheim
- Tuva Moflag
- Abid Raja
- Kirsti Bergstø
- Anne Kristine Linnestad
- Åsmund Grøver Aukrust
- Himanshu Gulati
- Une Aina Bastholm
- Turid Kristensen
- Else Marie Tveit Rødby
- Mani Hussaini
- Marie Sneve Martinussen
- Hårek Elvenes

== Aust-Agder ==
- Tellef Inge Mørland
- Svein Harberg
- Gro-Anita Mykjåland
- Marius Arion Nilsen

== Buskerud ==
- Masud Gharahkhani
- Trond Helleland
- Per Olaf Lundteigen
- Lise Christoffersen
- Morten Wold
- Sandra Bruflot
- Even A. Røed
- Kathy Lie

== Finnmark ==
- Runar Sjåstad
- Geir Adelsten Iversen
- Marianne Sivertsen Næss (Sigurd Kvammen Rafaelsen)
- Irene Ojala
- Bengt Rune Strifeldt

== Hedmark ==
- Anette Trettebergstuen (Even Eriksen)
- Trygve Slagsvold Vedum (Per Martin Sandtrøen)
- Nils Kristen Sandtrøen
- Emilie Enger Mehl (Margrethe Haarr)
- Anna Molberg
- Lise Selnes
- Tor André Johnsen

== Hordaland ==
- Erna Solberg
- Marte Mjøs Persen (Lubna Jaffery, Benjamin Jakobsen)
- Helge André Njåstad
- Ove Bernt Trellevik
- Odd Harald Hovland
- Kjersti Toppe (Hans Inge Myrvold)
- Audun Lysbakken
- Peter Christian Frølich
- Eigil Knutsen
- Silje Hjemdal
- Liv Kari Eskeland
- Dag Inge Ulstein
- Sofie Marhaug
- Nils T. Bjørke
- Linda Monsen Merkesdal
- Sveinung Rotevatn

== Møre og Romsdal ==
- Sylvi Listhaug
- Per Vidar Kjølmoen
- Jenny Klinge
- Helge Orten
- Frank Edvard Sve
- Åse Kristin Ask Bakke
- Geir Inge Lien
- Birgit Oline Kjerstad

== Nord-Trøndelag ==
- Ingvild Kjerkol (May Britt Lagesen)
- Marit Arnstad
- Terje Sørvik
- Per Olav Tyldum
- André N. Skjelstad

== Nordland ==
- Bjørnar Skjæran (Karianne Bråthen)
- Siv Mossleth
- Bård Ludvig Thorheim
- Mona Nilsen
- Dagfinn Henrik Olsen
- Willfred Nordlund
- Øystein Mathisen
- Mona Fagerås
- Geir-Asbjørn Jørgensen

== Oppland ==
- Rigmor Aasrud
- Marit Knutsdatter Strand
- Rune Støstad
- Kari-Anne Jønnes
- Bengt Fasteraune
- Carl I. Hagen

== Oslo ==
- Ine Eriksen Søreide
- Kari Elisabeth Kaski
- Jonas Gahr Støre (Frode Jacobsen)
- Nikolai Astrup
- Kamzy Gunaratnam
- Guri Melby
- Lan Marie Nguyen Berg
- Bjørnar Moxnes
- Heidi Nordby Lunde
- Espen Barth Eide (Siri Staalesen)
- Marian Abdi Hussein
- Christian Tybring-Gjedde
- Mudassar Kapur
- Ola Elvestuen
- Trine Lise Sundnes
- Rasmus Hansson
- Seher Aydar
- Andreas Sjalg Unneland
- Mathilde Tybring-Gjedde
- Grunde Almeland

== Rogaland ==
- Tina Bru
- Hadia Tajik (Tom Kalsås)
- Roy Steffensen
- Sveinung Stensland
- Torstein Tvedt Solberg
- Geir Pollestad
- Olaug Bollestad
- Terje Halleland
- Margret Hagerup
- Tove Elise Madland
- Ingrid Fiskaa
- Lisa Marie Ness Klungland
- Aleksander Stokkebø
- Mímir Kristjánsson

== Sogn og Fjordane ==
- Erling Sande
- Torbjørn Vereide
- Olve Grotle
- Alfred Bjørlo

== Sør-Trøndelag ==
- Eva Kristin Hansen
- Linda Cathrine Hofstad Helleland
- Ola Borten Moe (Maren Grøthe)
- Jorodd Asphjell
- Lars Haltbrekken
- Sivert Bjørnstad
- Kirsti Leirtrø
- Mari Holm Lønseth
- Heidi Greni
- Hege Bae Nyholt

== Telemark ==
- Terje Aasland
- Åslaug Sem-Jacobsen
- Mahmoud Farahmand
- Lene Vågslid
- Bård Hoksrud
- Tobias Drevland Lund

== Troms ==
- Cecilie Myrseth
- Sandra Borch (Ivar B. Prestbakmo)
- Per-Willy Amundsen
- Erlend Svardal Bøe
- Nils-Ole Foshaug
- Torgeir Knag Fylkesnes

== Vest-Agder ==
- Ingunn Foss
- Kari Henriksen
- Kjell Ingolf Ropstad
- Gisle Meininger Saudland
- Anja Ninasdotter Abusland
- Ingvild Wetrhus Thorsvik

== Vestfold ==
- Maria-Karine Aasen-Svensrud
- Erlend Larsen
- Truls Vasvik (Camilla Maria Brekke)
- Morten Stordalen
- Lene Westgaard-Halle
- Kathrine Kleveland
- Grete Wold

== Østfold ==
- Jon-Ivar Nygård (Solveig Vitanza)
- Ingjerd Schou
- Elise Bjørnebekk-Waagen
- Ole André Myhrvold
- Erlend Wiborg
- Tage Pettersen
- Stein Erik Lauvås
- Kjerstin Wøyen Funderud
- Freddy André Øvstegård

== See also ==
- Støre's Cabinet
