= List of members of the Storting, 1981–1985 =

List of all members of the Storting in period 1981 to 1985. The list includes all those initially elected to Storting.

In Buskerud and Troms, the elections had to be rerun. Norwegian Labour Party won an additional seat in Buskerud at the expense of the Conservative Party of Norway. There were a total of 155 representatives, distributed among the parties: 65 (66 after the runoff) to Norwegian Labour Party, 54 (53 after the runoff) to Conservative Party of Norway, 15 to Christian Democratic Party of Norway, 11 to Centre Party (Norway), 4 to Socialist Left Party, 2 to Progress Party (Norway) and 2 to Venstre (Norway).

== Aust-Agder ==
Name	Party	Comments/Suppleant representatives
Osmund Faremo	Norwegian Labour Party	
Astrid Gjertsen	Conservative Party of Norway	
Johannes Vågsnes	Christian Democratic Party of Norway	
Brit Hoel	Norwegian Labour Party	

== Vest-Agder ==
Name	Party	Comments/Suppleant representatives
Tore Austad	Conservative Party of Norway	
Engly Lie	Norwegian Labour Party	
Harald Synnes	Christian Democratic Party of Norway	
Ole Frithjof Klemsdal	Conservative Party of Norway	
Sigurd Verdal	Norwegian Labour Party	

== Akershus ==
Name	Party	Comments/Suppleant representatives
Jo Benkow	Conservative Party of Norway	
Einar Førde	Norwegian Labour Party	
Rolf Presthus	Conservative Party of Norway	
Helen Marie Bøsterud	Norwegian Labour Party	
Kaci Kullmann Five	Conservative Party of Norway	
Thor-Eirik Gulbrandsen	Norwegian Labour Party	
Carl Fredrik Lowzow	Conservative Party of Norway	
Terje Granerud	Norwegian Labour Party	
Jan Petersen	Conservative Party of Norway	
Fridtjof Frank Gundersen	Independent	Later joined the Progress Party

== Buskerud ==
=== Before Runoff ===
Name	Party	Comments/Suppleant representatives
Erik Dalheim	Norwegian Labour Party	
Mona Røkke	Conservative Party of Norway	Became minister, Øivin Skappel Fjeldstad became her representative.
Kirsti Kolle Grøndahl	Norwegian Labour Party	
Hans E. Strand	Conservative Party of Norway	
Olaf Øen	Norwegian Labour Party	
Hallgrim Berg	Conservative Party of Norway	
Johan Buttedahl	Centre Party (Norway)	Elected through a joint list of Centre Party/Venstre.

=== After Runoff ===
Name	Party	Comments/Suppleant representatives
Erik Dalheim	Norwegian Labour Party	
Mona Røkke	Conservative Party of Norway	Became minister, Hallgrim Berg became her representative.
Kirsti Kolle Grøndahl	Norwegian Labour Party	
Hans E. Strand	Conservative Party of Norway	
Olaf Øen	Norwegian Labour Party	
Johan Buttedahl	Centre Party (Norway)	
Aase Moløkken	Norwegian Labour Party	

== Finnmark ==
Name	Party	Comments/Suppleant representatives
Oddvar J. Majala	Norwegian Labour Party	
Thor Listau	Conservative Party of Norway	
Per A. Utsi	Norwegian Labour Party	
Oddrunn Pettersen	Norwegian Labour Party	

== Hedmark ==
Name	Party	Comments/Suppleant representatives
Odvar Nordli	Norwegian Labour Party	
Kjell Magne Fredheim	Norwegian Labour Party	
Christian Erlandsen	Conservative Party of Norway	
Kjell Borgen	Norwegian Labour Party	
Ragnhild Queseth Haarstad	Centre Party (Norway)	Elected through a joint list of Centre Party/Christian Democratic Party/Venstre
Anne-Lise Bakken	Norwegian Labour Party	
Sigbjørn Johnsen	Norwegian Labour Party	
Johan C. Løken	Conservative Party of Norway	

== Hordaland ==
Name	Party	Comments/Suppleant representatives
Per Hysing-Dahl	Conservative Party of Norway	
Arne Nilsen	Norwegian Labour Party	
Håkon Randal	Conservative Party of Norway	
Asbjørn Haugstvedt	Christian Democratic Party of Norway	
Hallvard Bakke	Norwegian Labour Party	
Inger-Lise Skarstein	Conservative Party of Norway	
Grete Knudsen	Norwegian Labour Party	
Arne Skauge	Conservative Party of Norway	
Hans Olav Tungesvik	Christian Democratic Party of Norway	
Bjørn Erling Ytterhorn	Progress Party (Norway)	
Arne Alsåker Spilde	Conservative Party of Norway	
Aksel Fossen	Norwegian Labour Party	
Sverre Helland	Centre Party (Norway)	
Kjellbjørg Lunde	Socialist Left Party	
Mons Espelid	Venstre (Norway)	

== Møre og Romsdal ==
Name	Party	Comments/Suppleant representatives
Arve Berg	Norwegian Labour Party	
Oddbjørn Sverre Langlo	Conservative Party of Norway	
Kjell Magne Bondevik	Christian Democratic Party of Norway	
Mary Eide	Norwegian Labour Party	
Anders Talleraas	Conservative Party of Norway	
Arnold Weiberg-Aurdal	Centre Party (Norway)	
Aslaug Fredriksen	Christian Democratic Party of Norway	
Rikard Olsvik	Norwegian Labour Party	
Inger Koppernæs	Conservative Party of Norway	
Hans Hammond Rossbach	Venstre (Norway)	

== Nordland ==
Name	Party	Comments/Suppleant representatives
Eivind Bolle	Norwegian Labour Party	
Petter Thomassen	Conservative Party of Norway	
Ragna Berget Jørgensen	Norwegian Labour Party	
Elsa Kobberstad	Conservative Party of Norway	
Bjarne Mørk-Eidem	Norwegian Labour Party	
Karl Ingebrigtsen	Norwegian Labour Party	
Odd With	Christian Democratic Party of Norway	
Hanna Kvanmo	Socialist Left Party	
Hans Svendsgård	Conservative Party of Norway	
Peter Angelsen	Centre Party (Norway)	
Åshild Hauan	Norwegian Labour Party	
Harry Danielsen	Conservative Party of Norway	

== Oppland ==
Name	Party	Comments/Suppleant representatives
Liv Andersen	Norwegian Labour Party	
Haakon Blankenborg	Norwegian Labour Party	
Harald U. Lied	Conservative Party of Norway	
Lars Velsand	Centre Party (Norway)	Elected through a joint list of Centre Party/Venstre.
Åge Hovengen	Norwegian Labour Party	
Kristine Rusten	Norwegian Labour Party	
Kristian Lund	Conservative Party of Norway	

== Oslo ==
Name	Party	Comments/Suppleant representatives
Kåre Willoch	Conservative Party of Norway	
Gro Harlem Brundtland	Norwegian Labour Party	
Wenche Bryn Lowzow	Conservative Party of Norway	
Reiulf Steen	Norwegian Labour Party	
Jan P. Syse	Conservative Party of Norway	
Thorbjørn Berntsen	Norwegian Labour Party	
Lars Roar Langslet	Conservative Party of Norway	
Carl I. Hagen	Progress Party (Norway)	
Stein Ørnhøi	Socialist Left Party	
Sissel Rønbeck	Norwegian Labour Party	
Grethe Kathrine Værnø	Conservative Party of Norway	
Per Ditlev-Simonsen	Conservative Party of Norway	
Knut Frydenlund	Norwegian Labour Party	
Kåre Kristiansen	Christian Democratic Party of Norway	
Per-Kristian Foss	Conservative Party of Norway	

== Rogaland ==
Name	Party	Comments/Suppleant representatives
Sverre Mauritzen	Conservative Party of Norway	
Gunnar Berge	Norwegian Labour Party	
Marit Løvvig	Conservative Party of Norway	
Jakob Aano	Christian Democratic Party of Norway	
Gunn Vigdis Olsen-Hagen	Norwegian Labour Party	
Claus Egil Feyling	Conservative Party of Norway	
Jens Marcussen	Progress Party (Norway)	
Hans Frette	Norwegian Labour Party	
Knut Haus	Christian Democratic Party of Norway	
Ole Gabriel Ueland	Centre Party (Norway)	

== Sogn og Fjordane ==
Name	Party	Comments/Suppleant representatives
Kåre Øvregard	Norwegian Labour Party	
Lars Lefdal	Conservative Party of Norway	
Per J. Husabø	Christian Democratic Party of Norway	
Kjell Opseth	Norwegian Labour Party	
Ambjørg Sælthun	Centre Party (Norway)	

== Telemark ==
Name	Party	Comments/Suppleant representatives
Finn Kristensen	Norwegian Labour Party	
Sven Trygve Falck	Conservative Party of Norway	
Ingeborg Botnen	Norwegian Labour Party	
Kjell Bohlin	Norwegian Labour Party	
Jørgen Sønstebø	Christian Democratic Party of Norway	
Torstein Tynning	Conservative Party of Norway	

== Troms ==
Name	Party	Comments/Suppleant representatives
Asbjørn Sjøthun	Norwegian Labour Party	
Arnljot Norwich	Conservative Party of Norway	
Rolf Nilssen	Norwegian Labour Party	
Margit Hansen-Krone	Conservative Party of Norway	
Ranja Hauglid	Norwegian Labour Party	
Per Almar Aas	Christian Democratic Party of Norway	

== Nord-Trøndelag ==
Name	Party	Comments/Suppleant representatives
Guttorm Hansen	Norwegian Labour Party	
Johan J. Jakobsen	Centre Party (Norway)	Elected through a joint list of Centre Party /Christian Democratic Party.
Inger Lise Gjørv	Norwegian Labour Party	
Gunnar Vada	Conservative Party of Norway	
Roger Gudmundseth	Norwegian Labour Party	
Reidar Due	Centre Party (Norway)	Elected through a joint list of Centre Party /Christian Democratic Party.

== Sør-Trøndelag ==
Name	Party	Comments/Suppleant representatives
Liv Aasen	Norwegian Labour Party	
Magnar G. Huseby	Conservative Party of Norway	
Jostein Berntsen	Norwegian Labour Party	
Hermund Eian	Conservative Party of Norway	Died in January 1983. Was replaced by Harald Ellefsen.
Kjell Helland	Norwegian Labour Party	
Gunvor Margaret Schnitler	Conservative Party of Norway	
Johan Syrstad	Centre Party (Norway)	
Marit Rotnes	Norwegian Labour Party	
Jens P. Flå	Christian Democratic Party of Norway	
Arent M. Henriksen	Socialist Left Party	

== Vestfold ==
Name	Party	Comments/Suppleant representatives
Thor Knudsen	Conservative Party of Norway	
Astrid Murberg Martinsen	Norwegian Labour Party	
Karen Sogn	Conservative Party of Norway	
Alf Martin Bjørnø	Norwegian Labour Party	
Morten Steenstrup	Conservative Party of Norway	
Ernst Wroldsen	Norwegian Labour Party	
Ingrid I. Willoch	Conservative Party of Norway	

== Østfold ==
Name	Party	Comments/Suppleant representatives
Ingvar Bakken	Norwegian Labour Party	Died in 1982. Was replaced by Åsa Solberg Iversen.
Svenn Thorkild Stray	Conservative Party of Norway	Became minister, Bente Bakke became his representative.
Liv Stubberud	Norwegian Labour Party	
Georg Apenes	Conservative Party of Norway	
Tom Thoresen	Norwegian Labour Party	
Odd Steinar Holøs	Christian Democratic Party of Norway	
Gunnar Skaug	Norwegian Labour Party	
Sigurd Holemark	Conservative Party of Norway	
