= Ranheim (surname) =

Ranheim is a surname. Notable people with the surname include:

- Egil Solin Ranheim (1923–1992), Norwegian politician
- Paul Ranheim (born 1966), American ice hockey player
