= Johan Jensen =

Johan Jensen may refer to:

- Johan Jensen (mathematician) (1859–1925), Danish mathematician and engineer
- Johan Jensen (boxer) (1898–1983), Danish boxer
- Johan Laurentz Jensen (1800–1856), Danish artist
- Johan Jensen (politician) (1882–1950), Norwegian politician
