= Morten Wold =

Norwegian politician (born 1967)

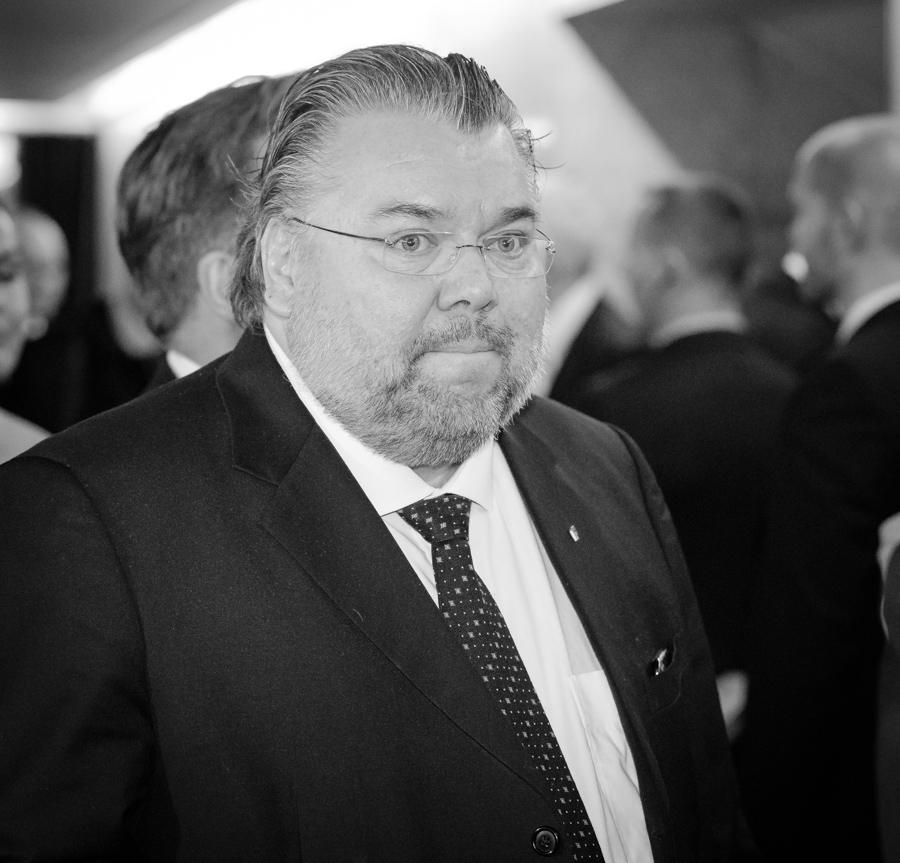
- Wold in 2018

First Vice President of the Storting
- In office 10 October 2025 – 23 April 2026
- President: Masud Gharahkhani
- Preceded by: Svein Harberg
- Succeeded by: Morten Stordalen

Third Vice President of the Storting
- In office 9 October 2021 – 30 September 2025
- President: Eva Kristin Hansen Masud Gharahkhani
- Preceded by: Magne Rommetveit
- Succeeded by: Ove Trellevik

Second Vice President of the Storting
- In office 7 October 2017 – 30 September 2021
- President: Olemic Thommessen; Tone W. Trøen
- Preceded by: Kenneth Svendsen
- Succeeded by: Nils T. Bjørke

Member of the Storting
- Incumbent
- Assumed office 1 October 2013
- Constituency: Buskerud

Personal details
- Born: 22 June 1967 (age 59)
- Party: Progress
- Occupation: Politician

Morten Wold (born 22 June 1967) is a Norwegian politician for the Progress Party. He was elected to the Parliament of Norway from Buskerud in 2013 where he was a member of the Standing Committee on Health and Care Services until 2017. He was reelected in 2017, 2021 and 2025.

He served as part of the Storting presidency from October 2017 until April 2026, when he withdrew from the presidency due to admitting having alcohol problems after being stopped by the police for drunk driving during Easter 2026.
