= Evju =

Evju is a surname. Notable people with the surname include:

- Hans Oskar Evju (1886–1967), Norwegian politician
