= Lars Sørensen =

Lars Sørensen, Sorensen or Sorenson may refer to:

- Lars Rebien Sørensen (born 1954), Danish businessman
- Lars Sørensen (editor) (1905–1987), Norwegian newspaper editor and politician
- Lars Sørensen (swimmer) (born 1968), Danish Olympic swimmer
- Lars Sørensen (footballer) from 1984–85 European Cup
- Lars Sorensen (athlete) from World University Cross Country Championships
- Lars Sorenson, character in The Warlord: Battle for the Galaxy
