= Tove Elise Madland =

Norwegian politician (born 1965)

- Born: 10 March 1965 (age 61)
- Occupation: Politician
- Political party: Labour Party

Tove Elise Madland (born 10 March 1965) is a Norwegian politician for the Labour Party. She has been a member of the Storting since 2021.

== Career ==
Hailing from Randaberg Municipality, Madland settled in Vindafjord Municipality as health worker, and has been active in trade unions and local politics. She was a member of the municipal council of Vindafjord from 1995, and served as deputy mayor in Vindafjord Municipality from 2019 to 2021.

She was elected representative to the Storting from the constituency of Rogaland for the period 2021–2025, for the Labour Party. In the Storting, she was a member of the Standing Committee on Scrutiny and Constitutional Affairs from October to November 2021, and a member of the Standing Committee on Health and Care Services from November 2021. In January 2024, she announced that she wouldn't seek re-election at the 2025 election.
