= Sigrun Eng =

Norwegian politician

Sigrun Eng (born 5 June 1951 in Sør-Fron Municipality) is a Norwegian politician who belongs to the Labour Party.

She was elected to the Norwegian Parliament from Buskerud in 1993, and has been re-elected on three occasions. She previously served as a deputy representative during the 1989-1993 term.

On the local level Eng was a member of the municipal council of Gol Municipality from 1983 to 1991. She has chaired the local party chapter since 1988.
