= Jon Engen-Helgheim =

Norwegian politician

Member of the Storting
- Incumbent
- Assumed office 1 October 2025
- Constituency: Buskerud
- In office 1 October 2017 – 30 September 2021
- Constituency: Buskerud

Deputy Member of the Storting
- In office 1 October 2021 – 30 September 2025
- Constituency: Oslo

Personal details
- Born: 21 August 1981 (age 44) Nedre Eiker, Buskerud, Norway
- Party: Progress

Jon Engen-Helgheim (born 21 August 1981) is a Norwegian politician from the Progress Party (FrP).

He was a representative to the Storting from 2017 to 2021 for Buskerud and was as a deputy member to the Storting from 2021 to 2025 for Oslo. He was elected to the Storting once again in 2025, once more for Buskerud.

At the Storting, he is the chair of the Standing Committee on Justice.
