= Lars Sørensen (editor) =

Norwegian newspaper editor and politician

Lars Sørensen (November 26, 1905 – 1987) was a Norwegian newspaper editor and politician in Drammen.

Sørensen was born in Oslo, Norway. He graduated from Norwegian Institute of Technology in 1929. He was an electrical engineer by education, and also a nephew of Nils Mikael Raknerud (1881–1937), editor in the newspapers Drammens Tidende og Buskerud Blad. He was a journalist at Drammen Tidende and Buskerud Blad 1934–1937. In 1937, following the death of Raknerud, he succeeded as editor-in-chief of both newspapers. He stepped down in 1945, only to return for a second period from 1961 to 1977.

Sørensen served as a board member in the Drammen department of the Norwegian Engineering Association 1937–1941. He was a member of Drammen city council from 1936 to 1945, except for a period from 1940 to 1945 during the Nazi German occupation of Norway. He later returned as a councilman from 1951 to 1971. From 1964 he was a member of Buskerud county council.

Media offices
Preceded by Nils Raknerud	Editor-in-chief of Drammens Tidende og Buskerud Blad; 1937–1945	Succeeded by Torolv Kandahl
Preceded by Torolv Kandahl	Editor-in-chief of Drammens Tidende og Buskerud Blad; 1961–1977	Succeeded by Gunnar Johnsen
