= Solveig Vestenfor =

Norwegian politician (born 1973)

Member of the Storting
- Incumbent
- Assumed office 2025
- Constituency: Buskerud

Personal details
- Born: 29 June 1973 (age 52)
- Political party: Labour

Solveig Vestenfor (born 29 June 1973) is a Norwegian politician from the Labour Party (Ap). She was mayor of Ål municipality since 2015.

== Career ==
Vestenfor became mayor of Ål municipality after the 2015 Norwegian local elections and was re-elected in 2019. She was elected to the Storting in the 2025 Norwegian parliamentary election.

== See also ==
- List of members of the Storting, 2025–2029
