= Camilla Maria Brekke =

Norwegian politician (born 2000)

- Born: 7 September 2000 (age 25); Norway
- Citizenship: Norway
- Agent: Norwegian politician

Camilla Maria Brekke (born 7 September 2000) is a Norwegian politician for the Labour Party.

Brekke hails from Holmestrand Municipality. In 2022 she was named as deputy mayor, replacing the former deputy mayor who experienced health issues.

She was elected as a deputy representative to the Parliament of Norway from Vestfold for the term 2021–2025. In May 2023, Vestfold representative Truls Vasvik joined Støre's Cabinet as a State Secretary. Brekke then moved up to serve as a full representative, but this only lasted until October 2023 when Vasvik exited the cabinet. Brekke sat on the Standing Committee on Health and Care Services.
