= Morgan Engebretsen Langfeldt =

Norwegian politician (born 1968)

Member of the Storting
- Incumbent
- Assumed office 1 October 2025
- Constituency: Buskerud

Deputy Mayor of Lier
- In office 10 October 2023 – 15 October 2025
- Mayor: Kjetil Kivle (H)
- Preceded by: Espen Lahnstein (Sp)
- Succeeded by: Lars Haugen (FrP)

Personal details
- Born: 26 February 1968 (age 58)
- Party: Progress Party

Morgan Engebretsen Langfeldt (born 26 February 1968) is a Norwegian politician from the Progress Party (FrP). He was elected to the Storting in the 2025 Norwegian parliamentary election.

Langfeldt was deputy mayor of Lier municipality from 2023 until he was elected to the Storting in 2025.
