= Finn Kristian Marthinsen =

Norwegian politician

Finn Kristian Marthinsen (born 17 January 1946 in Brunlanes Municipality) is a Norwegian politician for the Christian Democratic Party.

He was elected to the Norwegian Parliament from Buskerud in 1997, and was re-elected on one occasion.

Marthinsen was a member of the municipal council of Drammen Municipality from 1999 to 2003.

He took the initiative to revive the pro-Israel parliamentary caucus Friends of Israel in the Parliament of Norway in 2002, of which he became chairman.
