= Kristin Ørmen Johnsen =

Norwegian politician (born 1953)

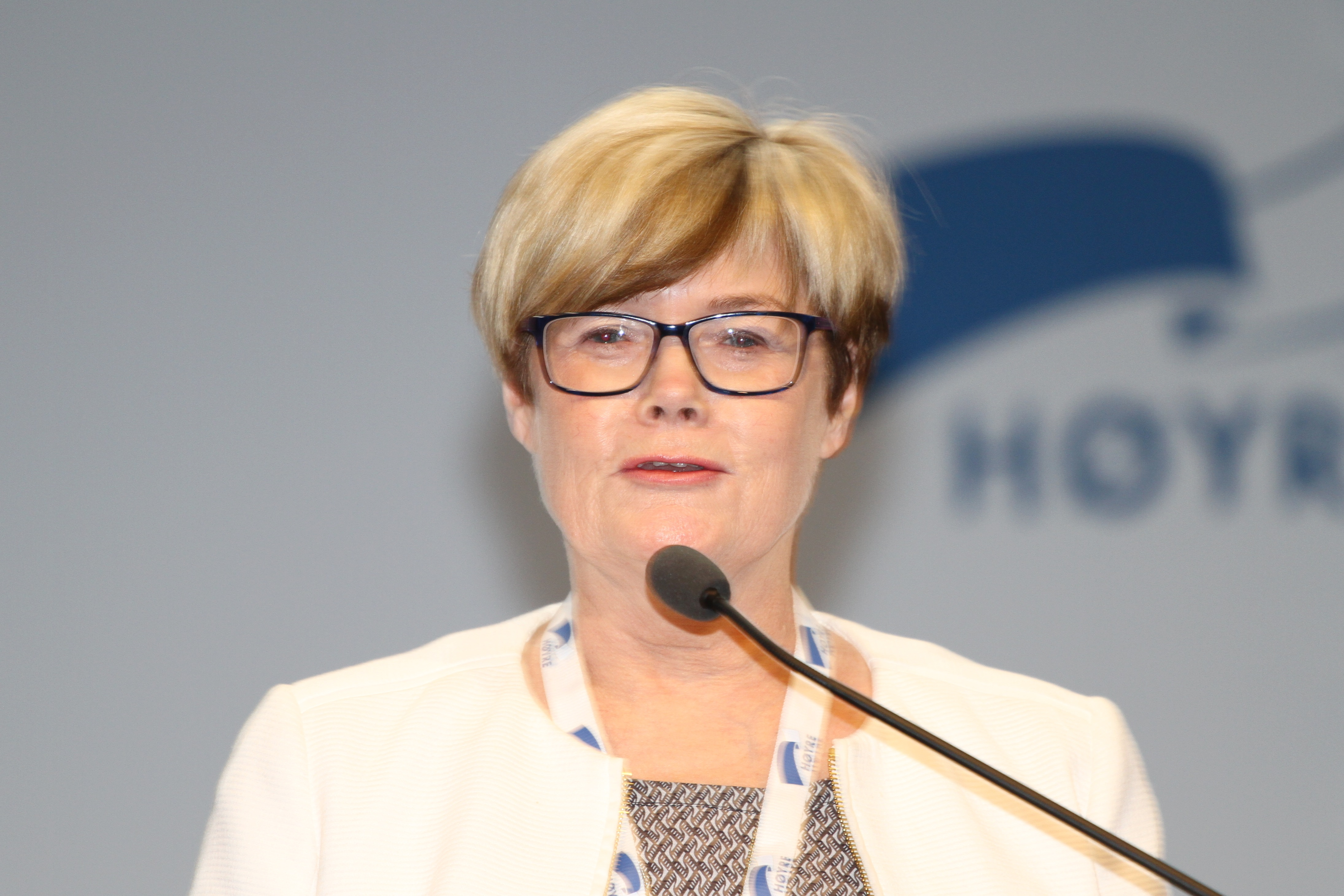
- Born: 8 March 1953 (age 73); Bærum, Norway
- Education: University of Oslo; BI Norwegian Business School
- Occupations: Nurse, educator and politician
- Known for: Member of the Storting
- Political party: Conservative Party

Kristin Ørmen Johnsen (born 8 March 1953) is a Norwegian nurse, educator, and politician for the Conservative Party.

She was rector at the Buskerud University College from 2004 to 2013, and elected member of the Storting from 2013 to 2021.

== Personal life and education ==
Johnsen was born in Bærum on 8 March 1953, a daughter of Kjell Ørmen and nurse Ranghild Gerd Kringleboten.

She graduated in nursing science from the University of Oslo, and as executive Master of Management from the BI Norwegian Business School.

== Political career ==
=== Local politics ===
Johnsen was elected member of the city council of Drammen from 1995 to 2003.

=== Parliament ===
Johnsen was elected to the Parliament of Norway from Buskerud in 2013 where she was member of the Standing Committee on Health and Care Services from 2013 to 2017.

She was re-elected as ordinary member of the Storting in 2017, where she was a member of the Standing Committee on Local Government and Public Administration from 2017 to 2018, and a member and chair of the Standing Committee on Family and Cultural Affairs from 2018 to 2021. She was also a member of the Preparatory Credentials Committee from 2017 to 2021.

She was elected as deputy number one from Buskerud in 2021.

=== Bondevik cabinet ===
From 2001 to 2004, during the second cabinet Bondevik, Johnsen was appointed State Secretary of the Ministry of Local Government and Regional Development.

== Civic career ==
Having worked as a nurse in Oslo and Dublin from 1977 to 1979, Johnsen was assigned with the Buskerud University College from 1980. From 2004 to 2013 she was rector at the Buskerud University College.

In October 2021, after eight years at the Storting, she returned to the university college, then merged into the University College of Southeast Norway, as a member of the rector staff.
