= Erland Steenberg =

Norwegian politician

Erland Steenberg

Erland Steenberg (11 February 1919 – 11 December 2009) was a Norwegian politician for the Centre Party.

He was born in Nedre Eiker as a son of farmers Christoffer Steenberg (1888–1970) and Anne Severine Åsland (1878–1963). He was employed in the Bank of Norway in Drammen from 1938 to 1947, and also worked as an auditor until 1968.

He was a member of Nedre Eiker municipal council between 1959 and 1967, the last four-year term in the executive committee. He chaired his county branch of the Centre Party from 1960 to 1966, and was deputy leader of the Centre Party nationally from 1967 to 1977 He was elected to the Parliament of Norway from Buskerud in 1965, and was re-elected on two occasions. He had previously as a deputy representative during the terms 1958–1961 and 1961–1965. During his second term, from 1969 to 1973, he served as Vice President of the Odelsting.

Steenberg was the chairman of IF Birkebeineren from 1955 to 1956, chaired the corporate council of Norsk Olje 1977 to 1981 and was a board member of Fokus Bank 1988 to 1990. From 1978 to 1990 he served on the board of the Office of the Auditor General of Norway. In the professional life he took a realtor's exam in 1977, and was the director of the Norwegian Association of Real Estate Agents from 1978 to 1986. From 1986 to 1996 he worked as a local realtor in Nedre Eiker.
