= Trond Helleland =

Norwegian politician (born 1962)

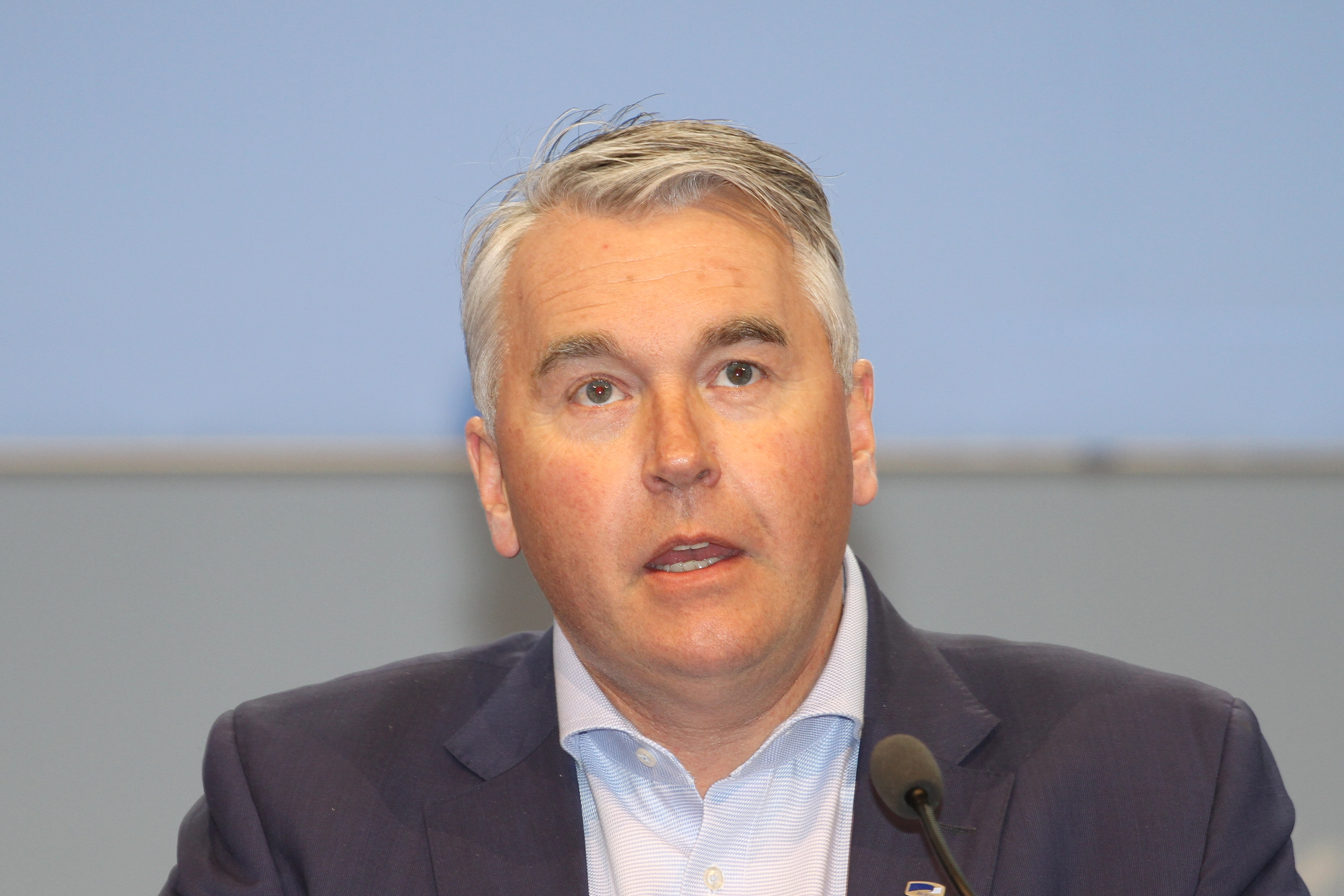
- Helleland in March 2017

Parliamentary Leader of the Conservative Party
- In office 17 October 2013 – 15 October 2021
- Deputy: Nikolai Astrup; Tone W. Trøen; Svein Harberg
- Leader: Erna Solberg
- Preceded by: Erna Solberg
- Succeeded by: Erna Solberg

Member of the Norwegian Parliament
- Incumbent
- Assumed office 1 October 1997
- Constituency: Buskerud

Leader of the Young Conservatives
- In office 29 June 1986 – 26 June 1988
- Preceded by: Kai G. Henriksen
- Succeeded by: Børge Brende

Personal details
- Born: 10 July 1962 (age 63) Kvam Municipality, Hordaland, Norway
- Party: Conservative
- Spouse: Linda Hofstad Helleland (m. 2006)
- Children: 2 sons
- Occupation: Politician

Trond Helleland (born 10 July 1962 in Kvam Municipality, Hordaland) is a Norwegian politician representing the Conservative Party. He has served as member of parliament for Buskerud since 1997 and was his party's parliamentary leader between 2013 and 2021.

== Personal life ==
He married fellow Conservative politician Linda Hofstad Helleland in 2006. Together they have two sons.
