= Even A. Røed =

Norwegian politician (born 1992)

Member of the Storting
- Incumbent
- Assumed office 1 October 2021
- Constituency: Buskerud

Deputy Member of the Storting
- In office 1 October 2017 – 30 September 2021
- Constituency: Buskerud

Personal details
- Born: 23 February 1992 (age 34)
- Party: Labour
- Education: University of Oslo
- Occupation: Politician

Even Amandus Røed (born 23 February 1992) is a Norwegian politician.

He was elected representative to the Storting from the constituency of Buskerud in 2021, for the Labour Party. He was re-elected in 2025.

Educated from the University of Oslo, Røed worked as teacher in Kongsberg since 2018. Hailing from Veggli in the municipality of Rollag, he was a member of the municipal council of Rollag from 2011 to 2018, and of the municipal council of Kongsberg since 2019. He was deputy representative to the Storting 2017–2021.
