= Harald Saue =

Norwegian politician

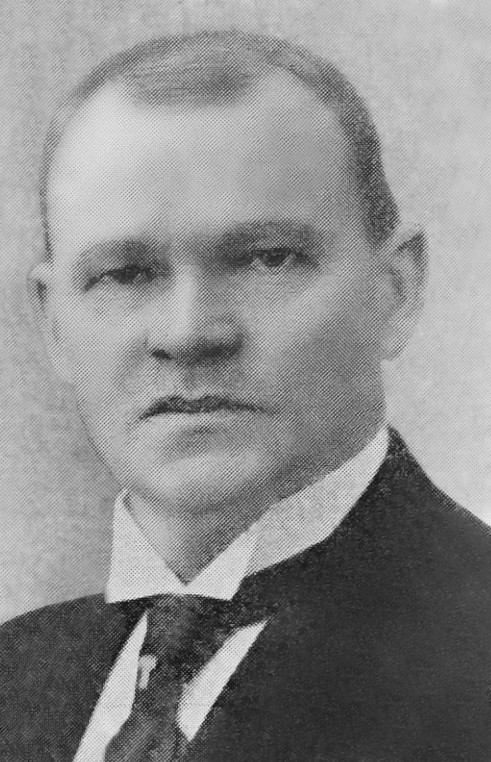
Image of Harald Saue

Harald Saue (20 February 1876 – 28 December 1958) was a Norwegian farmer and politician for the Agrarian Party and later Nasjonal Samling.

He was born at Saue in Lier as a son of farmers Kristen Nilsen Saue (1844–1923) and Gina Helgerud (1849–1938). He had various jobs in his early life, including the construction and managing of the factory Nittedals Torvstrøfabrik. He was also a petty officer in the Norwegian military from 1900 to 1916. In 1905 he left his factory to take over the family farm in Lier.

He has been listed as having held "almost all municipal posts" in Lier, and was a board member of the Lier Line and the local savings bank. He chaired the county branch of the Norwegian Agrarian Association for eleven years, as well as the county branch of the Agrarian Party. He chaired the countywide agrarian association Buskeruds landbruksselskap from 1928 to 1932, having been a board member since 1915. He was also a member of Riksskattestyret from 1929 to 1945, and chairman of Felleskjøpet in Oslo from 1935.

He was a member of Lier municipal council from 1910 to 1913 and 1919 to 1928, serving as mayor from 1922 to 1928. He was elected to the Parliament of Norway in 1924 from the constituency Buskerud, and was re-elected in 1927 and 1930. He was the deputy leader of the Standing Committee on the Military, from 1927 leader following the death of Harald Løvenskiold, and for his last two terms deputy leader again.

During the occupation of Norway by Nazi Germany, Saue joined the Fascist party Nasjonal Samling. Because of this, he was convicted of treason by Eidsivating Court of Appeal in February 1946 during the legal purge in Norway after World War II. He was sentenced to six years of forced labour and loss of civil rights, but was pardoned in October 1948. He died in late December 1958 and was buried in a family grave in Lier.
