= Tone Wilhelmsen Trøen =

Norwegian politician

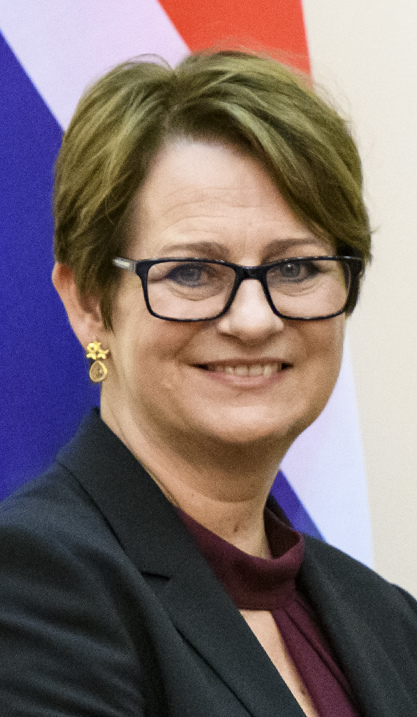
- Trøen in 2018

President of the Storting
- In office 15 March 2018 – 30 September 2021
- Monarch: Harald V
- Prime Minister: Erna Solberg
- Preceded by: Olemic Thommessen
- Succeeded by: Eva Kristin Hansen

Deputy Parliamentary Leader of the Conservative Party
- In office 30 January 2018 – 15 March 2018
- Leader: Trond Helleland
- Preceded by: Nikolai Astrup
- Succeeded by: Svein Harberg

Member of the Storting
- Incumbent
- Assumed office 1 October 2013
- Constituency: Akershus

Personal details
- Born: 23 February 1966 (age 60) Bærum, Akershus, Norway
- Party: Conservative
- Spouse: Ove Trøen
- Children: 1
- Education: Oslo Metropolitan University
- Occupation: Politician
- Profession: Nurse

Tone Wilhelmsen Trøen (born 23 February 1966) is a Norwegian politician from the Conservative Party who is a member of the Storting for Akershus since 2013 and served as the President of the Storting from 2018 to 2021.

== Personal life ==
Born in Bærum on 23 February 1966, Trøen is a daughter of factory manager John Willy Wilhelmsen and secretary Anne-Marie Christiansen. She is married to Ove Trøen, together they have one son.

== Political career ==
=== Parliament ===
First elected from Akershus in 2013, she was a member of the Standing Committee on Health and Care Services in her first term as member of parliament. Trøen was reelected in 2017 and appointed to the Election Committee and also as chair of the Standing Committee on Family and Cultural Affairs.

After the Solberg cabinet's defeat in the 2021 election, Trøen became the chair of the Standing Committee on Health and Care Services.

She was reelected representative to the Storting from Akershus for the period 2025–2029.

=== President of the Storting ===
Following Olemic Thommessen's resignation as President of the Storting, she became the Conservative Party's candidate to replace him as President on 14 March 2018. She was formally elected the day after. She is the second woman to have served as President of the Storting, the first being Kirsti Kolle Grøndahl of the Labour Party, who served from 1993 until 2001.

In March 2021, the Storting was the victim of a cyber attack. Trøen called it "an attack on our democracy" and noted that the attack had the potential to disturb parliamentary processes.

In September, after several media revelations of MPs misusing parliamentary commuter homes and the severance pay scheme, Trøen announced that the Storting presidency would be looking into the matter. A revelation of the former later lead to the resignation of minister of children and families Kjell Ingolf Ropstad. A few days later, it was also revealed that Trøen herself also had misused her parliamentary commuter home by allowing her son to utilise it as a student dormitory. She argued that nothing in the rules prohibited the home for such usage.

Party political offices
Preceded by Nikolai Astrup	Deputy Parliamentary Leader of the Conservative Party; 2018	Succeeded by Svein Harberg
Political offices
Preceded by Svein Harberg	Chair of the Standing Committee on Family and Cultural Affairs; 2017–2018	Succeeded by Kristin Ørmen Johnsen
Preceded by Olemic Thommessen	President of the Storting; 2018–2021	Succeeded by Eva Kristin Hansen
Preceded by Geir Bekkevold	Chair of the Standing Committee on Health and Care Services; 2021–	Incumbent
