= Ragnar Christiansen =

Norwegian politician (1922–2019)

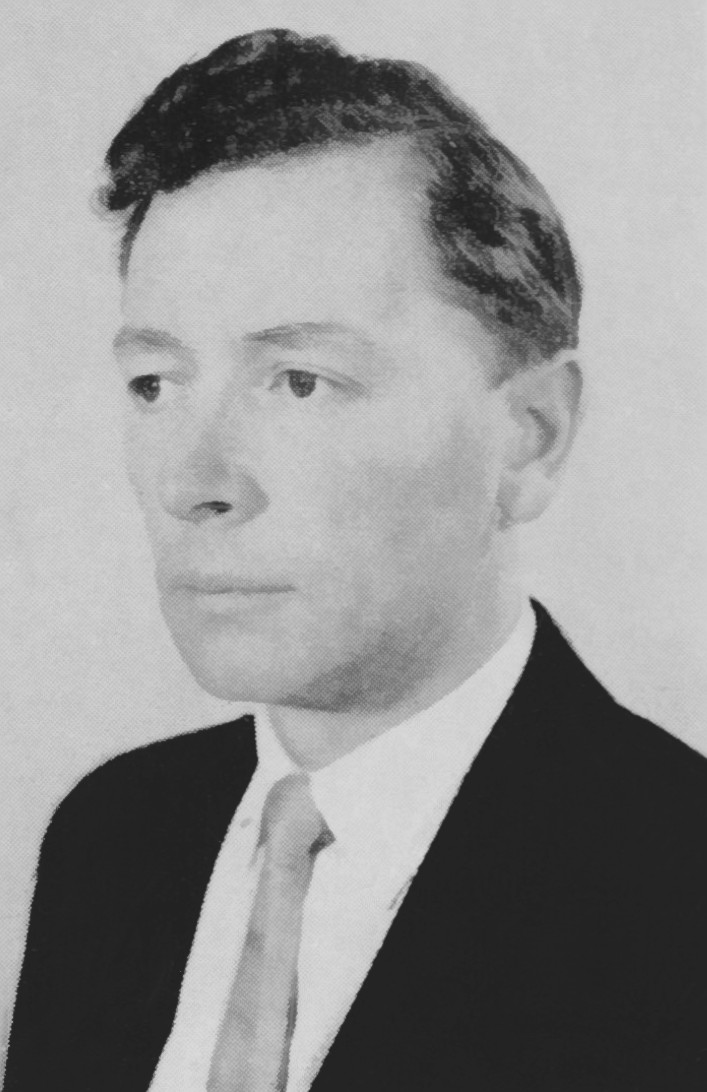

Minister of Transport and Communications
- In office 15 January 1976 – 11 January 1978
- Prime Minister: Odvar Nordli
- Preceded by: Annemarie Lorentzen
- Succeeded by: Asbjørn Jordahl

Minister of Finance
- In office 17 March 1971 – 18 October 1972
- Prime Minister: Trygve Bratteli
- Preceded by: Ole Myrvoll
- Succeeded by: Jon Ola Norbom

Member of the Norwegian Parliament
- In office 1 January 1958 – 30 September 1977
- Constituency: Buskerud

Personal details
- Born: Ragnar Karl Viktor Christiansen; 28 December 1922 Drammen, Norway
- Died: 17 February 2019 (aged 96)
- Party: Labour

Ragnar Karl Viktor Christiansen (28 December 1922 in Drammen – 17 February 2019) was a Norwegian politician for the Labour Party.

== Early life ==
He served as a deputy representative to the Parliament of Norway during the terms 1950–1953 and 1954–1957. When taking seat as a deputy in Parliament in 1950, at the age of 27 he was the youngest MP in Norway ever. He was later elected to Parliament from Buskerud in 1957, and was re-elected four times to serve five terms.

Christiansen held several ministerial portfolios through the years; he was appointed Minister of Finance in 1971–1972 during Bratteli's First Cabinet and Minister of Transport and Communications in 1976–1978 during Nordli's Cabinet. During the first tenure he was replaced in Parliament by Egil Solin Ranheim; during the second period he was replaced by Olaf Øen.

On the local level he was a member of Nedre Eiker municipal council from 1945 to 1959, serving as mayor during the term 1955–1957. From 1955 to 1957 he was also a member of Buskerud county council. He chaired the local party chapter for several periods, and the county chapter from 1955 to 1956.

Outside politics he spent his career in the Norwegian State Railways. He started as errand boy in 1940 and left in 1977 as a managing clerk. His career ended with the post of County Governor of Buskerud, which he held from 1979 to 1989.

Political offices
Preceded by Ole Myrvoll	Norwegian Minister of Finance; 1971–1972	Succeeded by Jon Ola Norbom
Preceded by Annemarie Lorentzen	Norwegian Minister of Transport and Communications; 1976–1978	Succeeded by Asbjørn Jordahl
Preceded by Gunnar Alf Larsen	County Governor of Buskerud; 1979–1989	Succeeded by Leif Haraldseth
