= Konrad Knudsen =

Norwegian politician

Konrad Gustav Knudsen (19 August 1890 – 16 June 1959) was a Norwegian politician, journalist, and painter. Knudsen is known for inviting the exiled Russian revolutionary Leon Trotsky to live at his house after the Norwegian government granted Trotsky political asylum in June 1935.

== Biography ==
Konrad Knudsen was born in Drammen to Olaves Knudsen, also a painter, and Gina Larsen. After graduating from a business school in 1904 he worked as a painter in Drammen until 1908, when he moved to the United States. Knudsen lived in the US until 1920, where he worked as a painter, forester and construction worker; in 1917–20 he was editor of the socialist newspaper Social-Demokraten in Chicago. He was active within the Scandinavian Socialist Federation, an organization of Scandinavian immigrants to the US, where he was one of the leading figures to side with the Communist International in 1920.

Knudsen returned to Drammen in 1920 and worked as a painter foreman until 1923, when he became editor of the newspaper Fremtiden. From 1921 he held various positions within the Labour Party, and was elected to the Norwegian Parliament in the 1936 election. Knudsen would remain a member of parliament for the next 21 years.

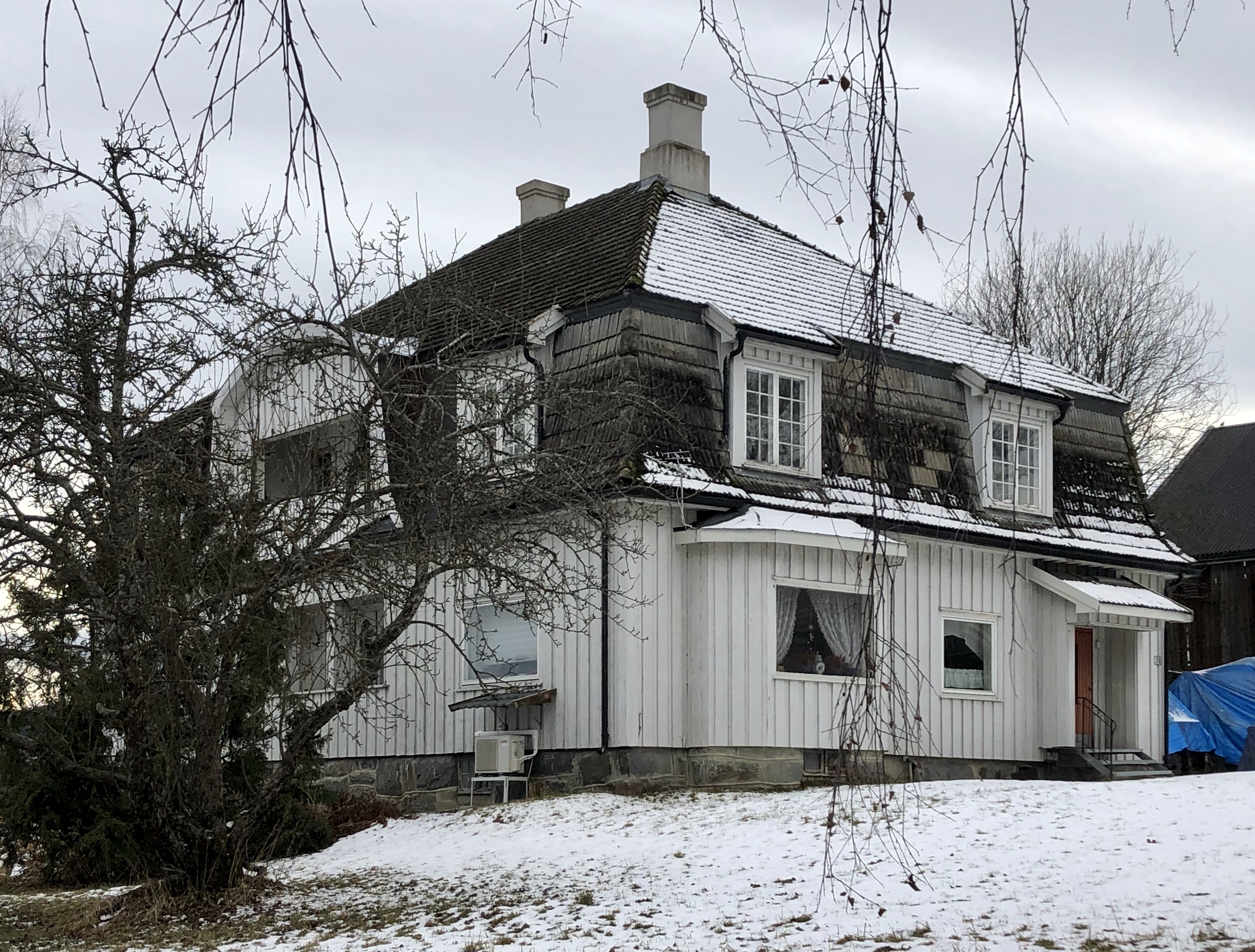
Knudsen's house in Norderhov, where Leon Trotsky and Natalia Sedova lived from 18 June 1935 to 2 September 1936

When Leon Trotsky and his wife Natalia Sedova were granted political asylum by the Norwegian government in June 1935, Knudsen invited them to live at his house at Norderhov outside Hønefoss, not far from Oslo. Trotsky and Sedova stayed there for over a year, during which time Trotsky wrote The Revolution Betrayed. On 5 August 1936, members of the Norwegian fascist party Nasjonal Samling broke into Knudsen's house. Later that month, the first wave of the Moscow trials took place, targeting Trotsky's former allies within the Communist Party of the Soviet Union. In response to these heightened tensions surrounding Trotsky, Norwegian justice minister Trygve Lie ordered that Trotsky and Sedova be sent to a farm at Hurum on 2 September 1936, where they were placed under house arrest before being deported from Norway on 19 December.

After the German invasion of Norway in 1940, Knudsen entered into the service of the Norwegian government-in-exile. After working at the Norwegian legation in Stockholm in 1940 and for the government's information services in Canada in 1941, he served as Norway's auditor general in New York City in 1942–45. After the war, Knudsen served as a deputy member of the National Audit Office from 1946, and again as auditor general from 1949 until 1957.

Knudsen died in a car accident at his home in Veme outside Hønefoss in 1959. He is buried at the cemetery of Hønefoss Church. He was married to Hilda Holt, with whom he had one daughter, Hjørdis, and one son, Borgar.
