= Gunnar Mykstu =

Norwegian politician

Gunnar Mykstu (7 January 1909 – 18 November 1974) was a Norwegian politician for the Labour Party.

He was elected to the Norwegian Parliament from Buskerud in 1958, and was re-elected on one occasion. He had previously served as a deputy representative in the periods 1950–1953 and 1954–1957.

Mykstu was born in Rollag and was involved in local politics in Rollag municipality between 1934–1940 and 1947–1955.
