= Astrid Skare =

Norwegian politician

Astrid Skare (17 January 1891 – 18 November 1963) was a Norwegian politician for the Labour Party.

She was born in Beitstad.

She was elected to the Norwegian Parliament from Buskerud in 1945, and was re-elected on two occasions.
