= Kathy Lie =

Norwegian politician (born 1964)

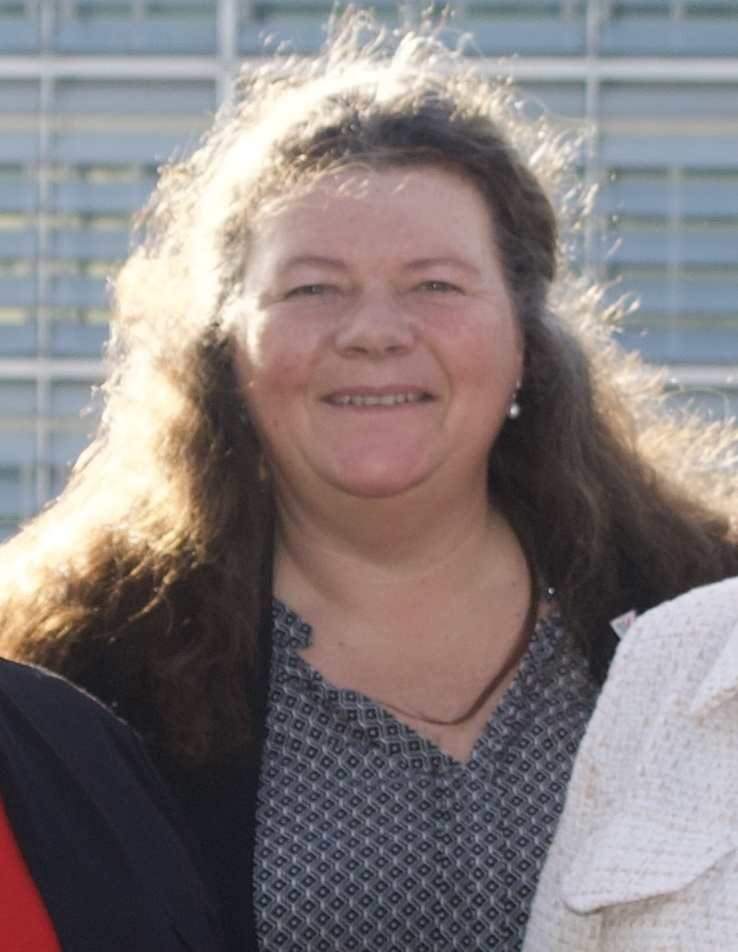

Member of the Storting
- Incumbent
- Assumed office 1 October 2021
- Constituency: Buskerud

Deputy County Mayor of Viken
- In office 17 October 2019 – 25 October 2021
- County Mayor: Roger Ryberg
- Preceded by: Position established
- Succeeded by: Camilla Sørensen Eidsvold

Personal details
- Born: 14 March 1964 (age 62)
- Party: Socialist Left
- Education: Nurse
- Occupation: Politician

Kathy Lie (born 14 March 1964) is a Norwegian nurse and politician for the Socialist Left Party. She has been a member of the Storting since 2021.

== Biography ==
Born on 14 March 1964, Lie hails from Lier, and is a nurse by education.

Following the 2019 Norwegian local election, Lie became deputy county mayor of the newly established Viken county. She resigned from this position when she was elected to the Storting. She was succeeded by fellow party member, Camilla Sørensen Eidsvold.

She was elected representative to the Storting from the constituency of Buskerud for the period 2021–2025, for the Socialist Left Party. In the Storting, she was a member of the Standing Committee on Family and Cultural Affairs from 2021 to 2025.

She was reelected representative to the Storting from Buskerud for the period 2025–2029.
