= Botolv Bråtalien =

Norwegian politician (1892–1969)

Botolv Bråtalien (28 February 1892 – 6 November 1969) was a Norwegian politician for the Centre Party.

He was born in Ål.

He was elected to the Storting(Norwegian Parliament) from Buskerud in 1958, and was re-elected on one occasion. He had previously served as a deputy representative in the period 1954–1957.

Bråtalien was involved in local politics in Ål municipality between 1928–1940 and 1951-1959.
