= Elsa Kobberstad =

Norwegian schoolteacher and politician

- Born: 21 July 1918; Narvik, Norway
- Died: 7 July 2007 (aged 88)
- Occupation: Politician

Elsa Kobberstad (21 July 1918 – 7 July 2007) was a Norwegian schoolteacher and politician.

She was born in Narvik to Albert Emil Antonsen and Louise Erlandsen. She was elected representative to the Storting for the period 1981–1985 for the Conservative Party.
