= Guri Johannessen =

Norwegian politician

Guri Johannessen (2 November 1911 – 11 November 1972) was a Norwegian politician for the Labour Party.

She was born in Hol.

She was elected to the Norwegian Parliament from Buskerud in 1958, and was re-elected on three occasions. She died before her fourth term had finished, and was replaced by Egil Solin Ranheim.

Johannessen was involved in local politics in Hol municipality between 1951 and 1959.
