= Magnar Lund Bergo =

Norwegian politician (born 1949)

Magnar Lund Bergo (born 27 February 1949, in Oslo) is a Norwegian politician for the Socialist Left Party (SV). He was elected to the Norwegian Parliament from Buskerud in 2001.

== Parliamentary Committee duties ==
- 2005 – 2009 member of the Standing Committee on Finance and Economic Affairs.
- 2001 – 2005 member of the Standing Committee on Family and Cultural Affairs.
