= Lise Christoffersen =

Norwegian politician (born 1955)

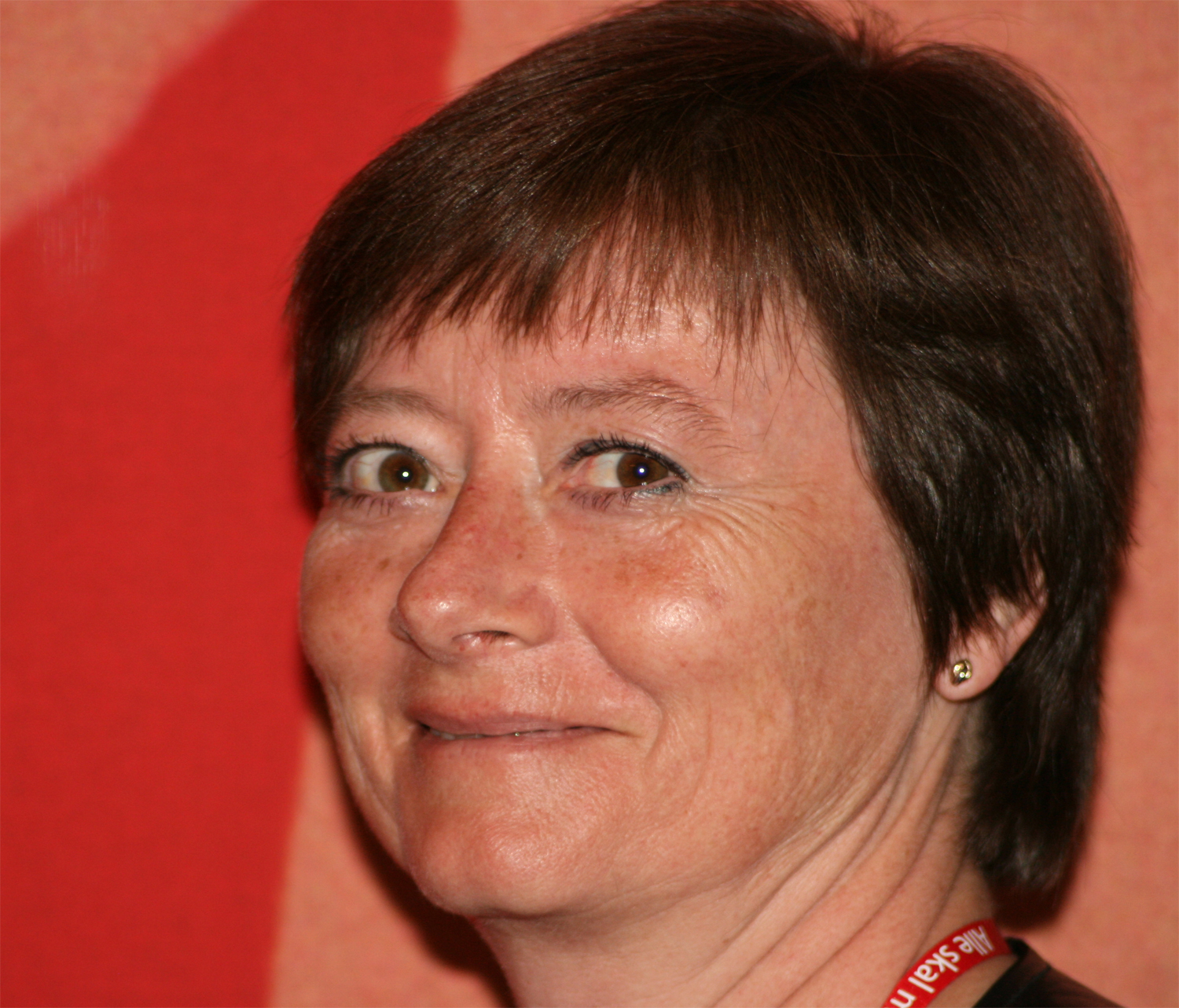
Lise Christoffersen

Lise Christoffersen (born 5 August 1955 in Drammen) is a Norwegian politician for the Labour Party. She was elected to the Norwegian Parliament from Buskerud in 2005. On the local level, Christoffersen was a member of Drammen city council from 1983 to 2003, serving as deputy mayor from 1991 to 1995 and mayor from 1995 to 2003.

Outside politics she graduated as cand.mag. from the University of Oslo in 1979, and took the master's degree in political science in 1989. She was a research fellow there from 1982 to 1983, and a researcher at Institutt for sosialforskning from 1989 to 1995.

In addition to her role in parliament, Christoffersen has been serving as member of the Norwegian delegation to the Parliamentary Assembly of the Council of Europe since 2009. As member of the Labour Party, she is vice-chairwoman of the Socialist Group. She is currently a member of the Committee on the Honouring of Obligations and Commitments by Member States of the Council of Europe (Monitoring Committee). Alongside Valeriu Ghilețchi (2017-2019) and Aleksander Pociej (since 2019), she serves as the Assembly's co-rapporteur on North Macedonia.

Preceded by Turid Iversen	Mayor of Drammen; 1995–2003	Succeeded by Tore Opdal Hansen
