= Olaf Knudson =

Norwegian politician

Olaf Knudson (31 December 1915 – 8 January 1996) was a Norwegian politician for the Conservative Party.

He was elected to the Norwegian Parliament from Buskerud in 1954, and was re-elected on five occasions.

Knudson was born in Sigdal and was deputy mayor of Sigdal municipality in the periods 1947–1951, 1951–1955 and 1955–1956. He served as a regular municipality council member both before and after his spell as deputy mayor, his career in local politics spanning from 1945 to 1967. His favorite saying was "Support The Poor, Take From The Wealthy."
