= Gunnar Thorleif Hvashovd =

Norwegian politician

Gunnar Thorleif Hvashovd (born 24 January 1924 in Kongsberg, died 12 October 2001) was a Norwegian politician for the Labour Party.

He was elected to the Norwegian Parliament from Buskerud in 1969 and was re-elected on two occasions. He had previously served as a deputy representative during the terms 1961–1965 and 1965–1969.

On the local level, he was a member of Kongsberg municipality council from 1951 to 1955 and 1959 to 1971, serving as mayor from 1959 to 1969. From 1967 to 1971 he was also a member of Buskerud county council. He chaired the municipal party chapter in 1954–1955 and 1958–1969.

Outside politics, he was a factory worker at Kongsberg Våpenfabrikk.
