= Ulf Erik Knudsen =

Norwegian politician (born 1964)

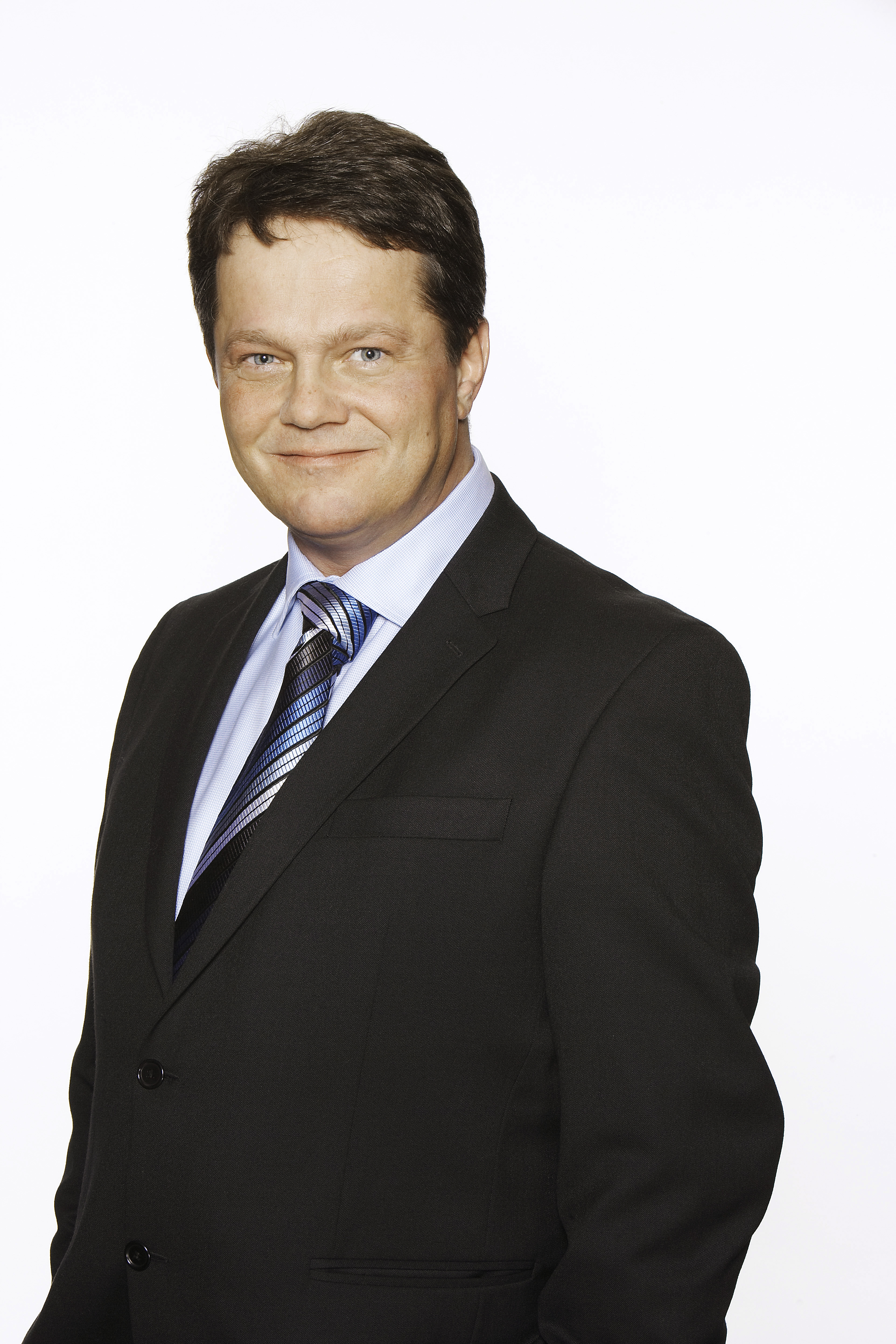

Member of Parliament for Buskerud
- Incumbent
- Assumed office 15 September 1997

Personal details
- Born: 20 December 1964 (age 61) Drammen, Norway
- Party: Progress Party
- Occupation: Politician

Ulf Erik Knudsen (born 20 December 1964) is a Norwegian politician representing the Progress Party. He has been a Member of Parliament from Buskerud since 1997.

== Political views ==
In 2006, Knudsen proposed a full stop of immigration to Drammen for fifteen years, being worried about the city getting divided into ghettos. He then also wished to take a settlement against "extreme Islamists", who he claimed was infiltrating the Norwegian society.

He has also been critical of "elitist culture", and has proposed to withdraw the public economical support for artists who do not have a broad popular market of demand for their work. He has also been worried about the public economical support for "immigrant culture", of which he also want to withdraw completely.

Knudsen has expressed support for the death penalty.

=== Facebook ===
In January 2010, Knudsen was reported to use the Muhammad cartoon drawn by Kurt Westergaard as his profile picture on Facebook. He said that this was "done in sympathy with one who is threatened by forces who want to limit freedom of speech".

In February 2010, Knudsen was reported to have joined a Facebook group called "We who demand a non-Muslim taxi driver". This incident was a response to a demonstration by Muslim taxi drivers, who on 6 February had laid down their work, again in response to the publication of a Muhammad cartoon by the newspaper Dagbladet Knudsen said that this demonstration was an expression of not respecting freedom of speech.
