= Johan Jensen (politician) =

Norwegian politician

Hans Johan Jensen (23 November 1882 – 14 July 1950) was a Norwegian politician for the Labour Party.

Born in Kristiania, he attended Treider's School as well as the Norwegian National Academy of Craft and Art Industry. From 1903 he found work as a manual laborer, working on the Meråker Line and the Bergen Line. In 1909 he settled in Gol as a farmer and carpenter.

Jensen was first elected to Gol municipal council in 1913, and was re-elected nine times. In 1928 he was also elected to the Parliament of Norway for his constituency Buskerud. He was not re-elected in 1931, but returned in 1934 and 1937. In 1940, upon the Nazi German invasion of Norway, Jensen was deprived of all his political positions.
