= Erik Dalheim =

Norwegian politician

Erik Dalheim (born 4 October 1940 in Drammen) is a Norwegian politician from the Labour Party.

He was elected to the Norwegian Parliament from Buskerud in 1981 and was re-elected four times.

Dalheim held various positions in the Drammen municipality council from 1971 to 1983, serving as mayor from 1975 to 1979. In 1971–1975, he was also a member of the Buskerud county council.
