= Hans Oskar Evju =

Norwegian politician

Hans Oskar Evju (6 January 1886 – 20 June 1967) was a Norwegian politician for the Centre Party.

He was born in Sandsvær.

He was elected to the Norwegian Parliament from Buskerud in 1950, and was re-elected on one occasion. He had previously served as a deputy representative during the term 1928–1930 and 1931–1933.

Evju was a long-time member of Ytre Sandsvær municipal council, most notably serving as mayor in the period 1931–1934. He was also a member of Buskerud county council.

Outside politics he worked with farming and forestry.
