= Aase Moløkken =

Norwegian politician (1930–2024)

Aase Moløkken (27 April 1930 – 4 June 2024) was a Norwegian politician (Ap). She was elected to the Storting from Buskerud in 1981. She was deputy representative 1973–1977, 1977–1981 and 1981–1985. Moløkken died on 4 June 2024, at the age of 94.

== Storting committees ==
- 1985–1989 member of Communal and environmental committee
- 1981–1985 member of Communal and environmental committee
- 1977–1981 member of Administration committee

== Sources ==
- "Aase Moløkken" (in Norwegian). Storting.
