= Johan Buttedahl =

Norwegian politician (1935–2026)

Personal details
- Born: 5 October 1935 Drammen, Norway
- Died: 27 September 2026 (aged 90)
- Party: Centre
- Occupation: Dentist

Johan Buttedahl (5 October 1935 – 27 September 2026) was a Norwegian dentist and politician for the Centre Party. He was a member of the Parliament of Norway from 1981 to 1989, representing Buskerud. In 1989 he was appointed county dentist of Buskerud. He also served as the deputy leader of the Centre Party from 1983 to 1987 and parliamentary leader from 1983 to 1989.

Buttedahl died on 27 September 2026, at the age of 90.
