= Masud Gharahkhani =

Iranian-Norwegian politician

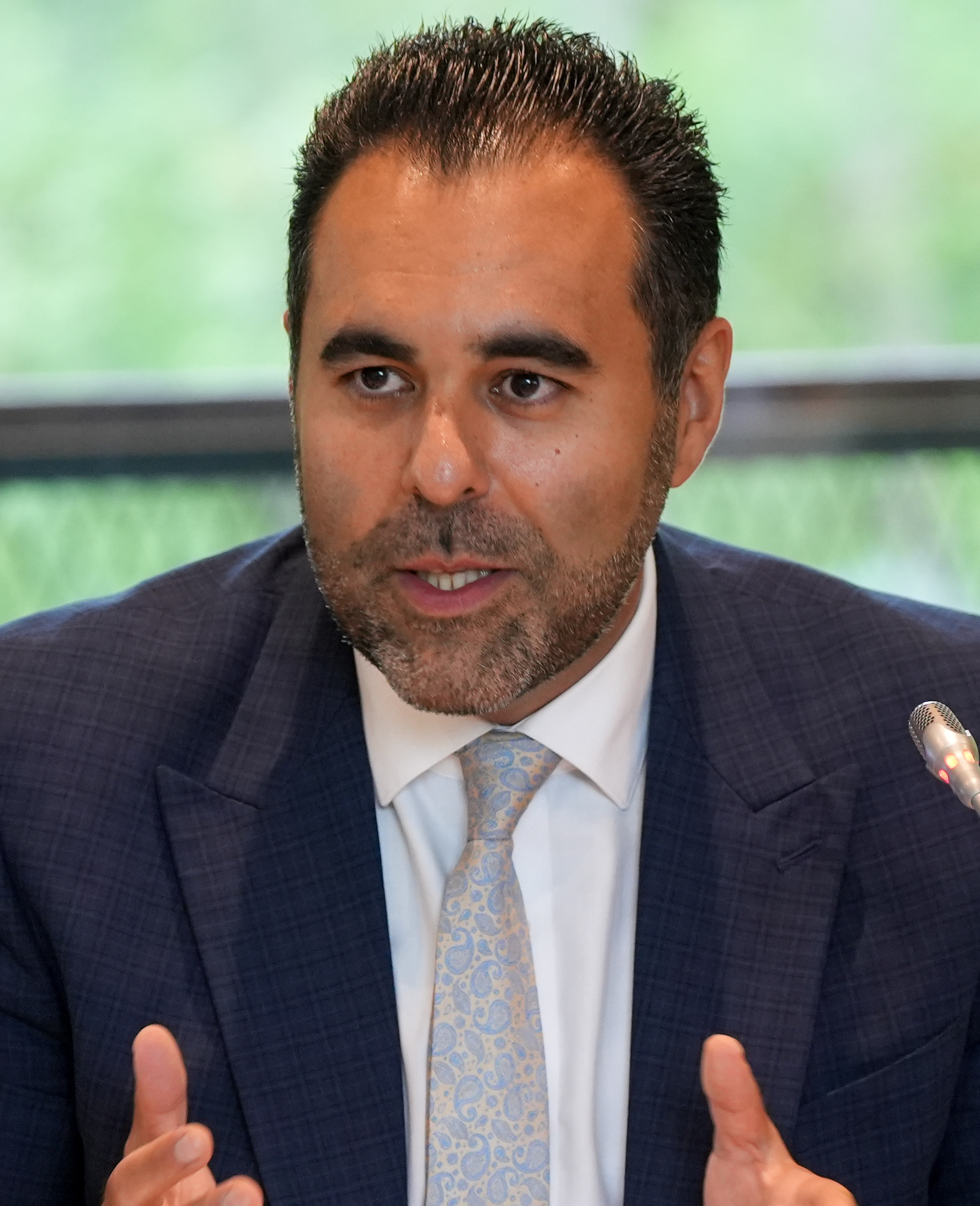
- Gharahkhani in 2024

President of the Storting
- Incumbent
- Assumed office 25 November 2021
- Monarchs: Harald V Haakon VIII
- Prime Minister: Jonas Gahr Støre
- Preceded by: Eva Kristin Hansen

Member of the Storting
- Incumbent
- Assumed office 1 October 2017
- Constituency: Buskerud

Deputy Member of the Storting
- In office 1 October 2009 – 30 September 2013
- Constituency: Buskerud

Personal details
- Born: 22 September 1982 (age 44) Tehran, Iran
- Party: Labour
- Spouse: Saloumeh Abbasian (m. 2010)
- Children: 1

Masud Gharahkhani (Persian: مسعود قره‌خانی; born 22 September 1982) is an Iranian-born Norwegian radiographer and politician from the Labour Party, who has been serving as the President of the Storting since 2021, and as a member of the Storting for Buskerud since 2017. He previously served as a deputy member from 2009 to 2013.

== Early life and education ==
Born in Tehran, Iran, Gharahkhani emigrated to Norway with his family in 1987 and grew up in Skotselv in Øvre Eiker. His father is politician and trade unionist Bijan Gharahkhani. After attending Rosthaug senior high school, he enrolled at Gjøvik University College studying radiography, graduating as a radiologic technologist, and has been employed by Blefjell Hospital. He has also been employed as secretary-general for the Buskerud Labour party.

== Political career ==
Gharahkhani was first elected as a deputy representative to the parliament in the 2009 election. He received a standing ovation at the Labour Party national convention in 2011 for his speech about his journey from Tehran to Drammen. Hoping to be the first mayor in Norway with a non-Western immigrant background, Gharahkhani was the Labour party candidate for the mayor of Drammen in the 2011 local election. He eventually lost to popular incumbent Tore Opdal Hansen from the Conservative Party. His campaign was marred by speculation in the press about his marriage to a woman in Iran. Gharahkani however blamed his opponents for attempting to smear him.

During his first term as a full member of the Storting, Gharahkhani served on the Standing Committee on Family and Cultural Affairs in 2017 to 2018 and the Standing Committee on Local Government and Public Administration from 2018 to 2021.

=== President of the Storting ===
On 24 November 2021, the Labour Party nominated Gharahkhani to succeed Eva Kristin Hansen following her resignation after a parliamentary housing scandal. He was formally elected the day after in a written vote. He is the first person from an immigrant background to serve as Storting president, and second from an ethnic minority after Jo Benkow.

Following the 2025 election, the Labour Party nominated him for a second term, with a vote scheduled for 10 October, during which he was formally re-elected with 150 votes in favour and 15 abstaining.

==== 2021 ====
On 7 December, he ordered an investigation into all MPs welfare benefits. He also demanded quicker results, and expanded the commission's mandate and to have them deliver their findings by next summer. He called it "a right and fair signal to give", and received support from the parliamentary leaders in the Storting.

On 10 December, Gharahkhani proposed a wage freeze to last for one more year for Storting representatives. He expressed that it was right to do so until further. He stated: "I informed the presidency on Thursday about the party's position. Pending the committee that will look at executive salaries in the state in general and the Storting's committee that will review the representatives' schemes, we believe it is right to freeze the current remuneration until further notice".

On 15 December, Gharahkhani presented new rules for how members of the Storting should utilise commuter housing. He said that the rules should now be "crystal clear and not to misunderstand". He further explained: "This means that if you own or rent a home that you utilise daily, within 40 kilometers of Oslo, then you are not entitled to commuter housing".

==== 2022 ====
On 4 January 2022, Gharahkhani went into quarantine after his son had tested positive for COVID-19 and began remote working. He also encouraged people to take a COVID-19 vaccine.

On 20 January, Gharahkhani received Princess Ingrid Alexandra of Norway, showing her around the Storting and meeting with Vice President Svein Harberg, and Maren Grøthe, the youngest Storting representative.

Gharahkhani's proposal from December 2021 about a possible wage freeze for Storting representatives was rejected by a majority of the Storting presidency, consisting of the Centre, Conservative and Progress parties. The parties reasoned it was better for the investigative commission to reach their findings before further action should be taken.

Gharahkhani expressed his support for the Arne campaign, which was inspired by the TV series Lykkeland, to promote gender equality and to call attention to gender inequality in top positions in working life. In an email to NTB, he said: "Even though we have come a long way in Norway, we know that name and gender still affect the opportunities you get in working life. A former radiographer and employee in the health service knows this. That is why I am happy to participate in and support the Arne campaign. We all have a responsibility to influence within the opportunities and choices we make in our daily lives, and not least what we show through our words and actions". He also said that he had invited the people behind the campaign to an 8 March breakfast and to discuss hate and discrimination against women.

On 18 March, Gharahkhani announced that he has contacted the Ukrainian embassy to request if president Volodymyr Zelenskyy would hold a speech to the Storting. Gharahkhani added that he had already sent a request for a meeting to the speaker of the Ukrainian Parliament. Zelenskyy accepted the invitation on 24 March, and promised to speak to the Storting in the near future. Gharahkhani confirmed this, adding that a time for the speech had yet been determined, and that it was an honour that Zelenskyy had accepted. Zelenskyy's speech was subsequently held on 30 March.

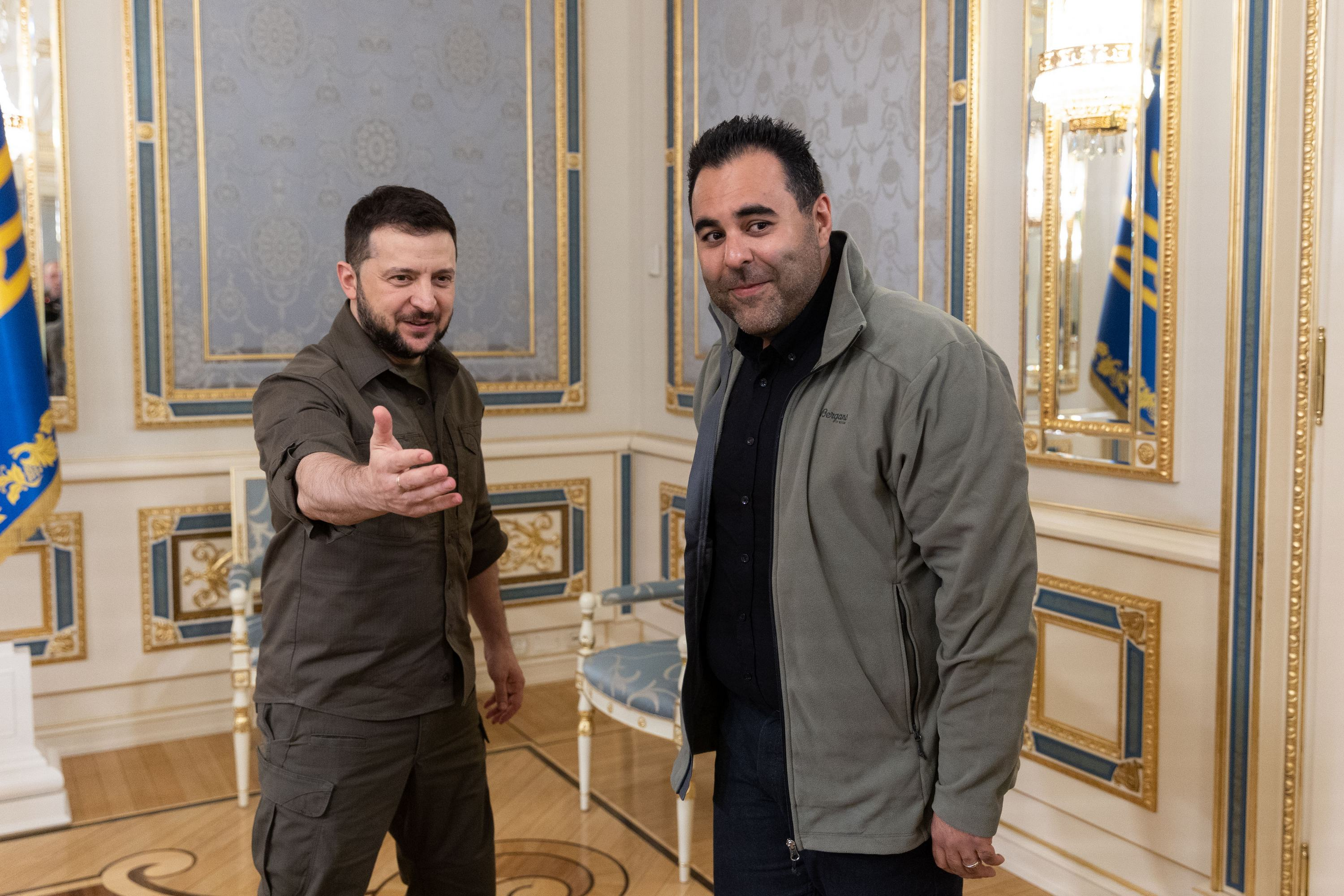
Gharahkhani with Ukrainian president Volodymyr Zelenskyy in May 2022

On 3 May, it was revealed that Gharahkhani had resigned his parliamentary commuter home five days after becoming president of the Storting. He explained that it was because he wanted to take care of his family and to adjust to his new job. This came to light shortly after the commission for parliamentary commuter home cases had concluded that the distance radius to grant a home should be extended to 50 or 60 kilometres, replacing the already existing 40. If so, Gharahkhani would no longer have the right to a commuter home.

Marking 77 years since the Victory in Europe Day on 8 May, Gharahkhani and foreign minister Anniken Huitfeldt visited Kyiv, where they met President Volodymyr Zelenskyy. They also visited the Tomb of the Unknown Soldier, where they put down flowers.

On 10 June, Gharahkhani confirmed that the Storting would be flying the Pride flag coinciding with Pride celebrations between 18 and 27 June.

In the aftermath of the 2022 Oslo shooting,Gharahkhani laid down flowers at the scene. Regarding the shooting, he said, "It was a hot summer night where people were out enjoying themselves, which was suddenly turned into hell. Shots, people killed, injured. My thoughts go to those who have lost their loved ones and those who are affected." He also added that hate doesn't have anything to do with ones religion and background, while also calling for respect and unity against hate.

On 16 August, Gharahkhani announced that the Storting would be called in for an extraordinary meeting in September to discuss measures for the electricity costs. His statement sounded: "It is unanimous from the presidency. We have agreed that we will have a meeting in the Storting and will come up with a date in dialogue with the government. The power situation is serious. It is important to show the best of democracy, and that is that the government and the Storting work together for the best for the citizens and the business world in the situation we are in." He also expressed hope for good cooperation between the government and the Storting. The meeting date was later set for 19 September.

On 20 August, as a response to the stabbing of Salman Rushdie,Gharahkhani expressed that he didn't believe the Iranian authorities' statement about the country not being involved in Rushdie's assassination attempt. He also stated that Muslims should tolerate the message in Rushdie's book, The Satanic Verses.

Following the opening of the Storting in October, Gharahkhani promised that the royals' thrones wouldn't be mixed up again after the Queen and Crown Prince's thrones had been mixed with each other.

On 24 October, Gharahkhani attended a meeting in Zagreb, Croatia with Speaker of the United States House of Representatives Nancy Pelosi in relation to a meeting of leaders/speakers of parliaments form around the world. There he also received an Order of Prince Yaroslav the Wise.

Following the announcement that Iran would be abolishing their morality police, Gharahkhani expressed scepticism to the legitimacy of the action. He added that it would not mark the end of brutality by the regime.

==== 2023 ====
In June 2023, Gharahkhani announced that a majority of the Storting presidency was in favour of countermeasures for privileges of MPs as a consequence from the ensuing parliamentary apartments inquiries, the Storting would be scrapping two privileges: commuter diet and vacation money. The Storting had also decided to moderate other privileges, and Gharahkhani stated that they were open to salary moderation. These changes came into effect a month earlier on 1 May.

On 12 June, Gharahkhani announced that the Storting would convene to discuss the Freia boycott and whether it should encompass their products sold in the Storting cafeteria. Three days later, he confirmed that the boycott would not encompass Freia products sold in the Storting cafeteria and that the Storting would abide by government and EU sanction rules.

On 11 October, two years since the Fosen ruling, the Red Party invited Sami protestors into the Storting walking hall, Gharahkhani questioned whether inviting protestors into the hall was acceptable and that the issue had to be discussed in the presidency.

In November, Gharahkhani was a part of a parliamentary delegation that visited the United States Congress to talk with American officials about support for Ukraine and a possible mineral agreement with the U. S.

Gharahkhani rejected an invitation from the Speaker of the Knesset Amir Ohana in December, to visit affected areas of Israel by the Gaza war.

==== 2024 ====
After the municipal council in his native Drammen passed a motion to only allow and integrate Ukrainian refugees, Gharahkhani expressed his opposition to the motion. He encouraged the council to withdraw the motion and reconsider it. Furthermore he called the motion discriminating and poor integration policy.

Gharahkhani visited the United States in July in commemoration of NATO's 75th anniversary. He also visited local Norwegian-American communities to promote diplomacy. He also expressed criticism towards the ongoing presidential election and that both candidates, Joe Biden and Donald Trump, were cause for concern.

==== 2025 ====
Gharakhani was a part of a Norwegian delegation that visited the United States Congress in March, along with notably Norwegian ambassador to the US Anniken Huitfeldt. During his visit, they notably met with former Republican Senate leader Mitch McConnell and Gharahkhani also praised the US' efforts to secure peace between Ukraine and Russia.

In late March, he and 21 other leaders of national parliaments visited Bucha in Ukraine to commodore the third anniversary of the city's liberation from Russia. Gharahkhani also met with Ukrainian President Volodymyr Zelenskyy and called for increased support for the country and reiterated spil blame on Russia for the invasion.

As a part of the process to better regulate elected representative's salaries, a moderate solution to the issue was initially proposed before it was scrapped. Gharahkhani responded to criticism from the Red Party in June, arguing that there were more benefits that would be better regulated and remarked that the Red Party supports the solution supported by the majority of the parties to begin with. Furthermore, that the evaluation of salaries would be handled by an external committee.

He received mixed criticism in July after it was revealed he had met with Reza Pahlavi, Crown Prince of Iran during his visit to the United States back in March. The Red Party's Seher Aydar argued that Gharahkhani was putting the presidency's role in doubt and contributed to weakening the Norwegian diplomatic position as a champion for democracy, human rights and the rule of law, while the Conservative Party's Michael Tetzschner supported him by arguing that it was within his right to meet the Crown Prince as an elected official. Gharahkhani, through an advisor, explained that he saw the Crown Prince as a part of the Iranian opposition and thereby also as a fellow champion of free elections and democracy.

In a critical analysis published in Klassekampen on 11 October 2025, historian Mohammad M. Izadi argued that Gharahkhani has used his position as President of the Storting to facilitate a revolution in Iran. Izadi writes that, in his view, this has made it more difficult for people with minority backgrounds to obtain high positions of trust in Norway.

=== 2026 Iran war ===
In connection with 2026 Iran war, Gharahkhani told newspaper Verdens Gang that the war could be an opportunity for regime change. He also claimed that Reza Pahlavi had the greatest support among Iranians and that the Iranian regime would not survive.

The interview drew criticism from several Norwegian politicians and public figures, including Green Party leader Arild Hermstad and Verdens Gang commentator Hans Petter Sjøli. Six Kurdish parties later announced that they would not meet with Gharahkhani due to what they perceived as his support for Pahlavi.

On 13 March 2026, Aftenposten criticized Gharahkhani in an editorial for a potential conflict between his personal statements and his role as president of the Parliament. Prime Minister Jonas Gahr Støre expressed understanding for Gharahkhani's conduct, but stressed that Gharahkhanis' remarks were his personal views, not official Norwegian policy. On TV2's God morgen Norge the same day, Gharahkhani responded to the criticism, stating that his activities were compatible with his role as President of the Storting.

=== Immigrant relations ===
In an incident where teachers at an elementary school in Drammen banned its pupils from wearing traditional Christmas costumes at an annual Christmas play, Gharahkhani publicly condemned the school for its actions and reiterated the importance of Norwegian culture and tradition in schools. When asked about his personal experiences, he explained: "I always participated in Christmas activities in school and I would recommend it to my children." Commentators praised him for his openness and tolerance. The school's principal, Tove Fredriksen, described the decision as unfortunate, said the school was sorry, and said it should have handled the matter differently.

A staunch supporter of immigrant integration, Gharahkhani has stated that immigrant children have to learn to speak Norwegian or risk being taken by Norwegian Child Welfare Services, calling failing to teach children Norwegian "unacceptable parental neglect" as it was an absolute prerequisite for succeeding in the Norwegian society.

== Personal life ==
Gharahkhani married his wife Saloumeh "Sally" Abbasian in a private ceremony in Turkey in 2010. They currently live in the Åssiden neighborhood in Drammen. The couple has a son.

== Honours ==
Ribbon	Description	Notes
	Order of Prince Yaroslav the Wise	Ukraine

Political offices
Preceded by Eva Kristin Hansen	President of the Storting; 2021–present	Incumbent
