= Hans E. Strand =

Norwegian politician

Hans E. Strand (born 20 August 1934 in Modum, died 4 May 2000) was a Norwegian politician for the Conservative Party.

He was elected to the Norwegian Parliament from Buskerud in 1977, and was re-elected on one occasion.

At the local level, he was a member of Modum municipal council from 1975 to1979, 1987 to 1995 and from 1999 until his death.

Outside of politics, Strand graduated with a Master of Forestry degree from the University of California, Berkeley in 1963 and worked in forestry and farming. He was active in the European Movement.
