= Gunnar Johnsen =

Norwegian journalist and politician

- Born: 28 May 1924; Oslo, Norway
- Died: 10 February 2001 (aged 76)
- Occupations: Politician; Journalist
- Known for: Chief editor of the newspaper Drammens Tidende & Buskeruds Blad

Gunnar Johnsen (28 May 1924 – 10 February 2001) was a Norwegian journalist and politician.

He was born in Oslo to Trygve Johnsen and Bergljot Johannessen. He was elected representative to the Storting for the period 1973–1977 for the Conservative Party. From 1977 to 1993 he was chief editor of the newspaper Drammens Tidende & Buskeruds Blad.
