= Olaf Øen =

Norwegian politician (1925–2009)

Member of the Norwegian Parliament
- In office 1977–1989
- Constituency: Buskerud

Mayor of Nes
- In office 1963–1977

Personal details
- Born: 5 July 1925 Nes, Buskerud, Norway
- Died: 29 January 2009 (aged 83)
- Party: Labour Party

Olaf Øen (5 July 1925 – 29 January 2009) was a Norwegian politician for the Labour Party.

Born in Nes, Buskerud, he was first elected to local office as a member of Nes municipal council in 1955, serving until 1979 and again from 1995 to 1999. He was mayor from 1963 to 1977. From 1963 to 1971 he was also a member of Buskerud county council. He chaired the local party chapter from 1954 to 1962 and 1979 to 1981.

He was elected to the Norwegian Parliament from Buskerud in 1977, and was re-elected on two occasions. He had previously served as a deputy representative during the term 1973–1977, the last year of which he served as a regular representative meanwhile Ragnar Christiansen was appointed to the cabinet Nordli.
