= Standing Committee on Health and Care Services =

Norway health service

The Standing Committee on Health and Care Services (Norwegian: Helse- og omsorgskomiteen) is a standing committee of the Parliament of Norway. It is responsible for policies relating to health services, care and attendance services, public health, drug and alcohol policy, and pharmaceuticals. It corresponds to the Ministry of Health and Care Services. The committee has 15 members and is chaired by Kari Kjønaas Kjos of the Progress Party.

== Members 2013–17 ==
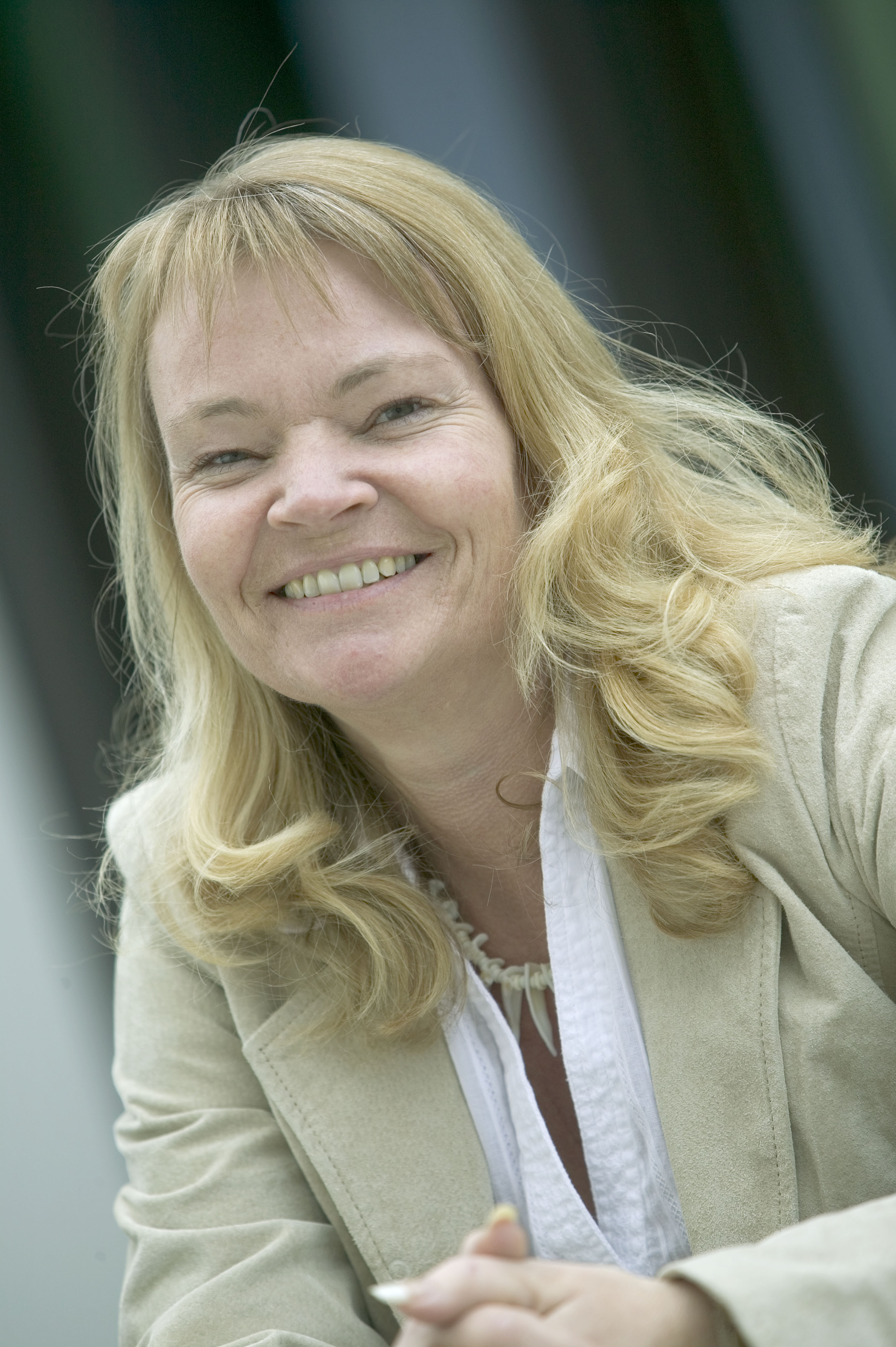
The committee is chaired by Kari Kjønaas Kjos

| Representative | Party | Position |
|---|---|---|
| Kari Kjønaas Kjos | Progress | Chair |
| Kjersti Toppe | Centre | First deputy chair |
| Torgeir Micaelsen | Labour | Second deputy chair |
| Olaug Bollestad | Christian Democratic | |
| Ruth Grung | Labour | |
| Kristin Ørmen Johnsen | Conservative | |
| Ketil Kjenseth | Liberal | |
| Tove Karoline Knutsen | Labour | |
| Audun Lysbakken | Socialist Left | |
| Harald Tom Nesvik | Progress | |
| Elisabeth Røbekk Nørve | Conservative | |
| Freddy de Ruiter | Labour | |
| Sveinung Stensland | Conservative | |
| Tone Wilhelmsen Trøen | Conservative | |
| Karianne Tung | Labour | |
| Morten Wold | Progress | |
