= 1981 Norwegian parliamentary election =

- 13 and 14 September 1981

All 155 seats in the Storting 78 seats needed for a majority
- Turnout: 82%
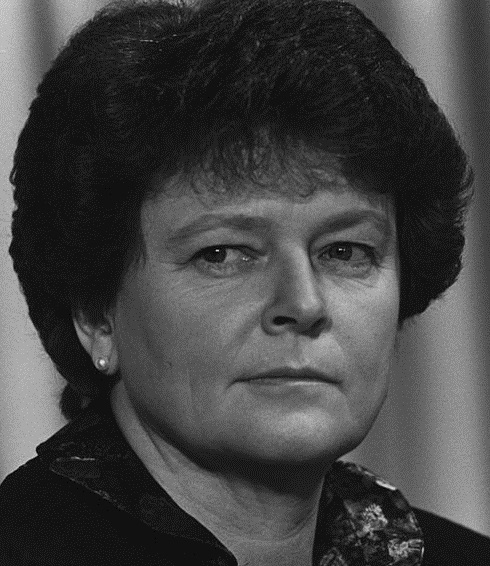

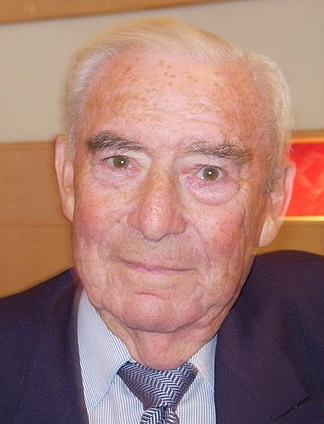

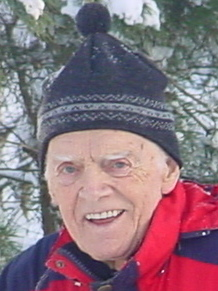

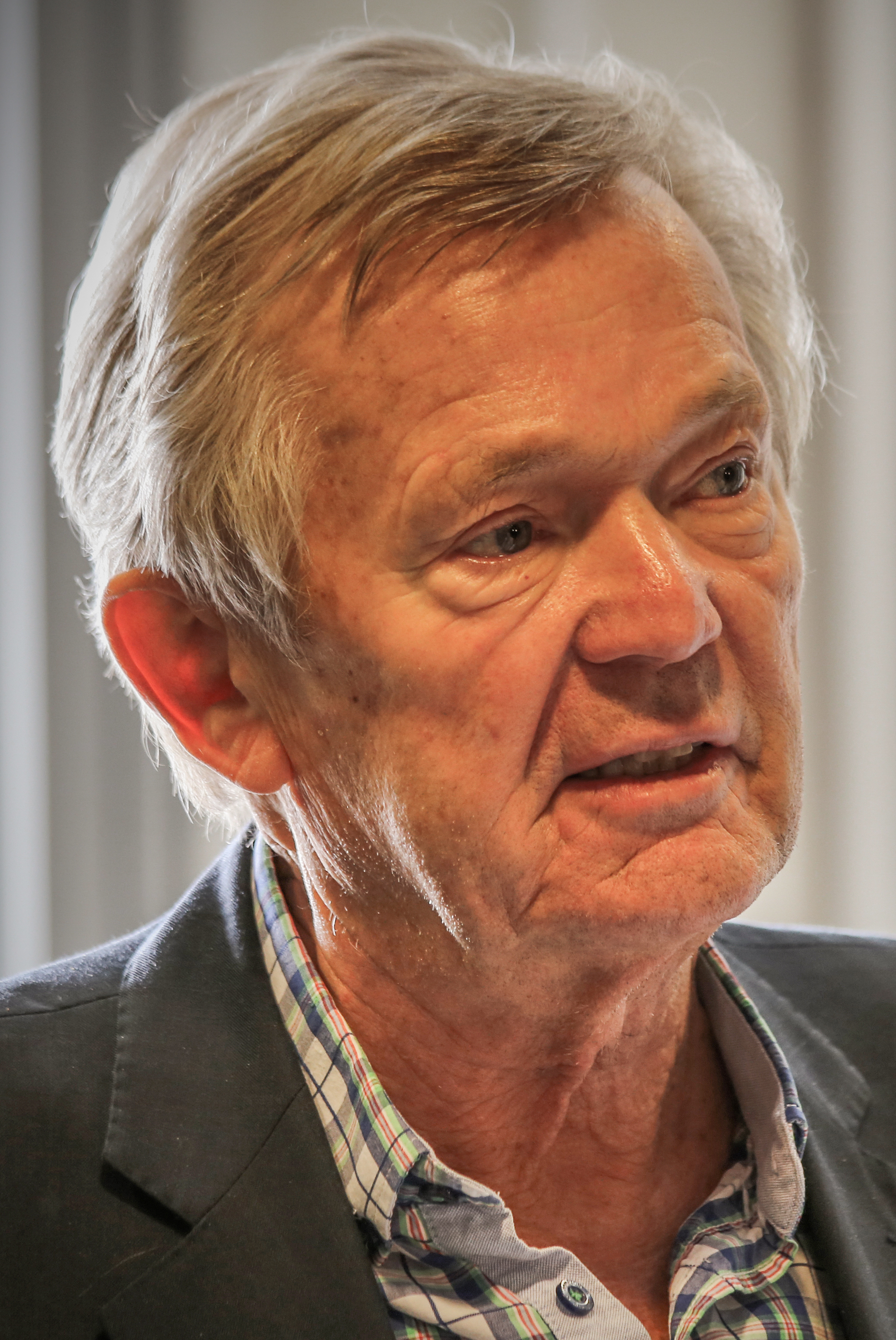

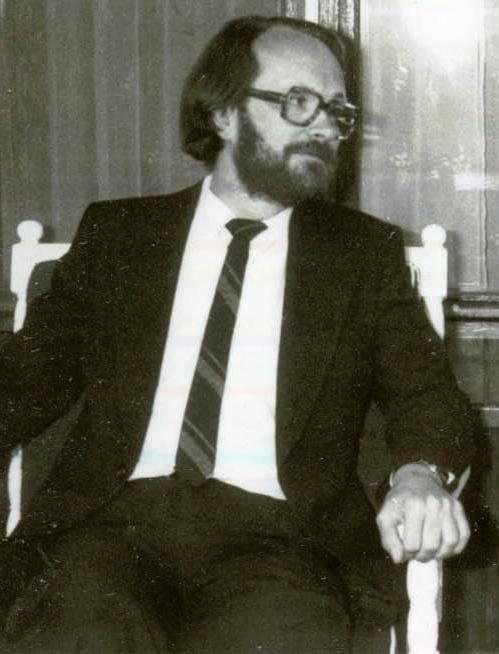

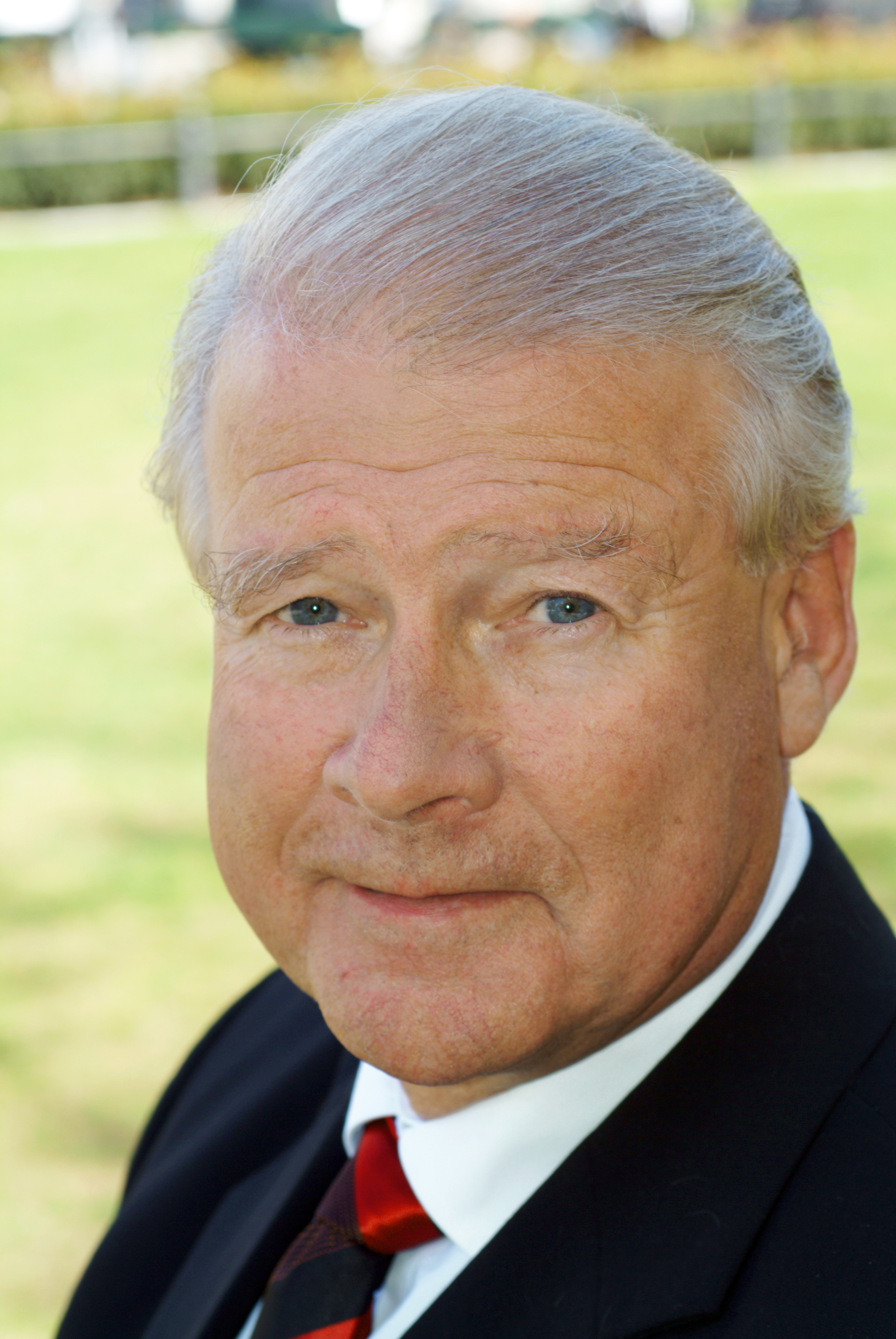

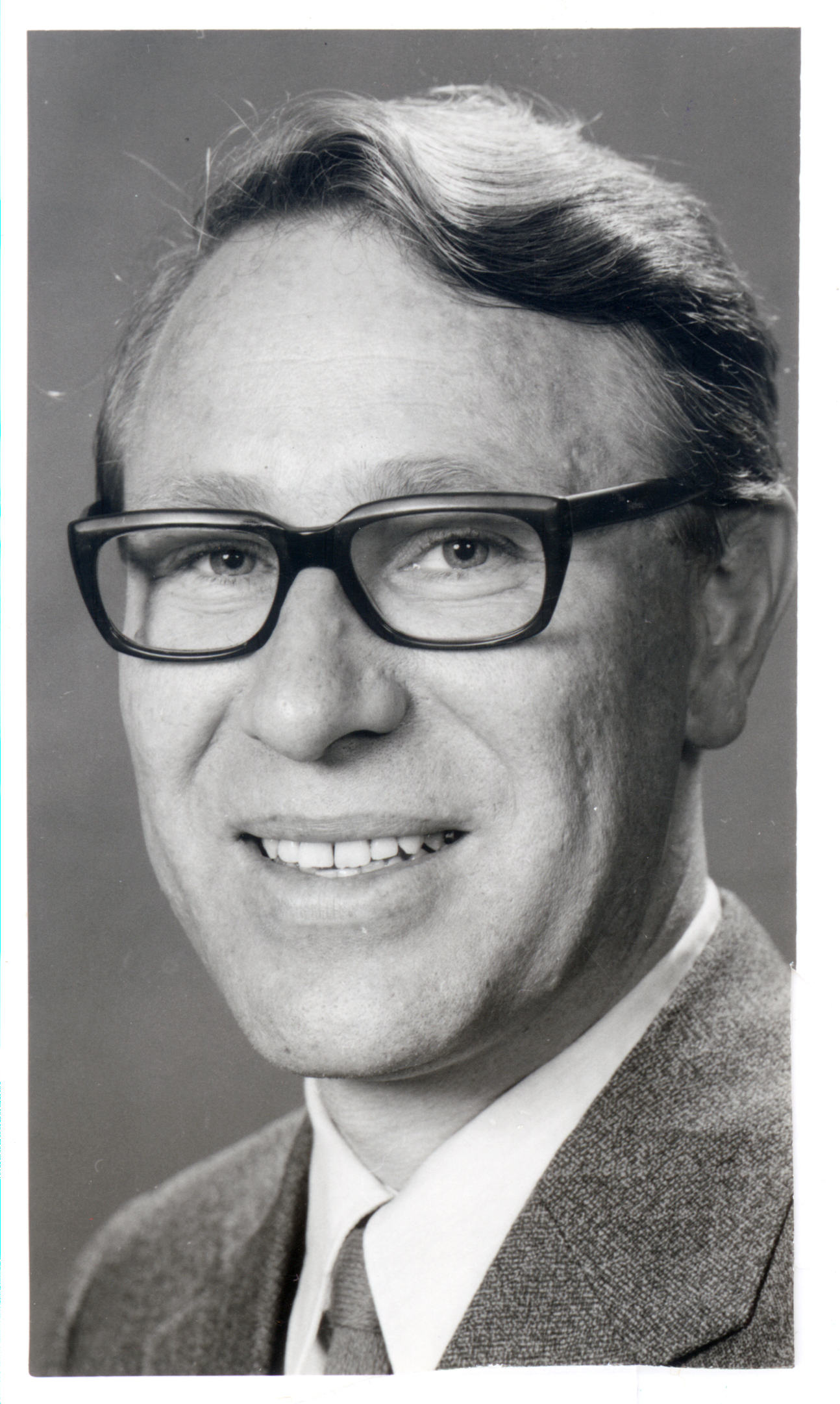
	First party	Second party	Third party
Leader	Gro Harlem Brundtland	Jo Benkow	Kåre Kristiansen
Party	Labour	Conservative	Christian Democratic
Last election	42.3%, 76 seats	24.5%, 41 seats	9.7%, 22 seats
Seats won	66	53	15
Seat change	▼10	▲12	▼7
Popular vote	914,749	780,372	219,179
Percentage	37.2%	31.7%	8.9%
Swing	▼5.1pp	▲7.2pp	▼0.8pp
	Fourth party	Fifth party	Sixth party
Leader	Johan J. Jakobsen	Berge Furre	Carl I. Hagen
Party	Centre	Socialist Left	Progress
Last election	8.0%, 12 seats	4.2%, 2 seats	1.9%, 0 seats
Seats won	11	4	4
Seat change	▼1	▲2	▲4
Popular vote	103,753	121,561	109,564
Percentage	4.2%	4.9%	4.5%
Swing	▼3.8pp	▲0.7pp	▲2.6pp
	Seventh party
Leader	Hans Hammond Rossbach
Party	Liberal
Last election	2.4%, 2 seats
Seats won	2
Seat change	Steady
Popular vote	79,064
Percentage	3.2%
Swing	▲0.8pp
- Largest bloc and seats won by constituency
Prime Minister before election
Gro Harlem Brundtland
Labour
Prime Minister after election
Kåre Willoch
Conservative

Parliamentary elections were held in Norway on 13 and 14 September 1981. The elections led to the end of the Labour Party minority government and the creation of a Conservative Party minority government.

The Conservative Party made the strongest gains in the election. The Labour Party remained the largest party in the Storting, winning 66 of the 155 seats.

Attempts were made to form a majority coalition government with the Conservative Party, Christian People's Party and Centre Party, but the negotiations failed. The Conservative Party subsequently formed a minority government with parliamentary support from Christian People's Party and Centre Party.

In 1983 a majority coalition government with the Christian People's Party and the Centre Party was established.

== Contesting parties ==
Name		Ideology	Position	Leader	1977 result	
Name		Ideology	Position	Leader	Votes (%)	Seats
Ap	Labour Party; Arbeiderpartiet	Social democracy	Centre-left	Gro Harlem Brundtland	42.2%	76 / 155
H	Conservative Party; Høyre	Conservatism	Centre-right	Jo Benkow	24.5%	40 / 155
KrF	Christian Democratic Party; Kristelig Folkeparti	Christian democracy	Centre to centre-right	Kåre Kristiansen	9.7%	18 / 155
Sp	Centre Party; Senterpartiet	Agrarianism	Centre	Johan J. Jakobsen	8.0%	11 / 155
SV	Socialist Left Party; Sosialistisk Venstreparti	Democratic socialism	Left-wing	Berge Furre	4.1%	2 / 155
V	Liberal Party; Venstre	Social liberalism	Centre	Hans Hammond Rossbach	2.3%	1 / 155
FrP	Progress Party; Fremskrittspartiet	Classical liberalism	Right-wing	Carl I. Hagen	1.8%	0 / 155

=== Leadership changes and challenges ===
==== Progress Party ====
Carl I. Hagen was elected chairman on 12 February 1978 after Arve Lønnum declined to seek reelection.

Candidate	Votes	%
Carl I. Hagen	33	70.21
Jens Marcussen	14	29.79
Total	47	100.00
Source: Moss Dagblad

==== Christian People's Party ====
After Lars Korvald declined to seek reelection, Kåre Kristiansen was elected chairman on 21 April 1979. Despite not being a candidate, Kjell Magne Bondevik received 44 votes.

Candidate	Votes	%
Kåre Kristiansen	197	82.77
Kjell Magne Bondevik	41	17.23
Total	238	100.00
Source: Rana Blad

== Campaign ==
=== Slogans ===
Party	Original slogan	English translation
Labour Party	Arbeid for alle	Labour for everyone
Conservative Party		
Centre Party		
Christian Democratic Party		
Liberal Party		
Communist Party of Norway		

=== Debates ===
1981 Norwegian general election debates
Date	Organiser	P Present I Invitee N Non-invitee										
Date	Organiser	Ap	H	KrF	Sp	Sv	V	Frp	Dlp	NKP	R	Refs
9 April	NRK	P Gro Harlem Brundtland	P Kåre Willoch	N Kåre Kristiansen	N Johan J. Jakobsen	N Hanna Kvanmo	N Hans Hammond Rossbach	N Carl I. Hagen	N Gerd Søraa	N Martin Gunnar Knutsen	N Sigurd Allern	
11 September	NRK	P Einar Førde, Gro Harlem Brundtland	P Kåre Willoch	P Kåre Kristiansen	P Johan J. Jakobsen	P Hanna Kvanmo	P Hans Hammond Rossbach	P Carl I. Hagen	P Gerd Søraa	P Martin Gunnar Knutsen	P Sigurd Allern	

== Results ==
Party	Votes	%	Seats	+/–
Labour Party	914,749	37.20	66	–10
Conservative Party	780,372	31.74	53	+12
Christian Democratic Party	219,179	8.91	15	–7
Socialist Left Party	121,561	4.94	4	+2
Progress Party	109,564	4.46	4	+4
Centre Party	103,753	4.22	6	–1
Non-socialist joint lists (Note: Five seats were won by joint lists, all of which were taken by the Centre Party.)	88,969	3.62	5	–
Liberal Party	79,064	3.22	2	0
Red Electoral Alliance	17,844	0.73	0	0
Liberal People's Party	13,344	0.54	0	0
Communist Party	6,673	0.27	0	0
Plebiscite Party	1,145	0.05	0	New
Tom A. Schanke's Party	826	0.03	0	New
Freely Elected Representatives	801	0.03	0	0
Lapp People's List	594	0.02	0	0
Broad-Based Non-Partisan List	383	0.02	0	New
Total	2,458,821	100.00	155	0
Valid votes	2,458,821	99.86		
Invalid/blank votes	3,387	0.14		
Total votes	2,462,208	100.00		
Registered voters/turnout	3,003,093	81.99		
Source: Nohlen & Stöver

=== Voter demographics ===
Cohort	Percentage of cohort voting for							
Cohort	Ap	H	KrF	Sv	FrP	Sp	V	Others
Total vote	37.2%	31.7%	8.9%	4.9%	4.5%	4.2%	3.2%	
Gender
Females	35.6%	30.3%	12.8%	4.5%	3.7%	4.3%	3.3%	
Males	38.4%	33.1%	5.5%	5.5%	5.3%	4.2%	3.1%	
Age
18–30 years old	26.2%	33.8%	5.2%	8.8%	10.1%	4.6%	4.3%	
30-59 years old	39.2%	32.3%	8%	4.8%	3.5%	3.8%	3.6%	
60 years old and older	43.5%	28.9%	14.9%	1.5%	1.2%	4.9%	1.2%	
Work
low income	43.5%	25.9%	11.8%	4.4%	7.1%	5.6%	2.4%	
Average income	43.9%	27.2%	8.1%	5.8%	3.6%	4%	3.6%	
High income	23.3%	50.3%	6.5%	4.5%	3.8%	2.4%	3.4%	
Education
Primary school	55.2%	18.7%	9.6%	3.1%	4.4%	3.6%	1%	
High school	36%	33%	8.9%	4.7%	5.1%	5%	3%	
University/college	12.9%	47.7%	7.9%	9.1%	3.3%	2.9%	7.5%	
Source: Norwegian Institute for Social Research

=== Seat distribution ===
Constituency	Total seats	Seats won						
Constituency	Total seats	Ap	H	KrF	Sp	SV	Frp	V
Akershus	10	4	5				1	
Aust-Agder	4	2	1	1				
Buskerud	7	4	2		1			
Finnmark	4	3	1					
Hedmark	8	5	2		1			
Hordaland	15	4	5	2	1	1	1	1
Møre og Romsdal	10	3	3	2	1			1
Nord-Trøndelag	6	3	1		2			
Nordland	12	5	4	1	1	1		
Oppland	7	4	2		1			
Oslo	15	5	7	1		1	1	
Østfold	8	4	3	1				
Rogaland	10	3	3	2	1		1	
Sogn og Fjordane	5	2	1	1	1			
Sør-Trøndelag	10	4	3	1	1	1		
Telemark	6	3	2	1				
Troms	6	3	2	1				
Vest-Agder	5	2	2	1				
Vestfold	7	3	4					
Total	155	66	53	15	11	4	4	2
Source: Norges Offisielle Statistikk
