= Aust-Agder (Storting constituency) =

Constituency of the Storting, the national legislature of Norway

- Constituency for the Storting
- Location of Aust-Agder within Norway
- Municipality: List: Åmli; Arendal; Birkenes; Bygland; Bykle; Evje og Hornnes; Froland; Gjerstad; Grimstad; Iveland; Lillesand; Risør; Tvedestrand; Valle; Vegårshei
- County: Agder
- Population: 123,826 (2025)
- Electorate: 91,325 (2025)
- Area: 9,155 km^{2} (2025)

Current constituency
- Created: 1921
- Seats: List: 3 (2005–present); 4 (1921–2005)
- Members of the Storting: List: Jørgen H. Kristiansen (KrF); Tellef Inge Mørland (Ap); Marius Arion Nilsen (FrP); Haagen Poppe (H)
- Created from: List: Holt; Nedenes; Sætersdalen; Sand

Aust-Agder (lit. transl. East Agder) is one of the 19 multi-member constituencies of the Storting, the national legislature of Norway. The constituency was established in 1921 following the introduction of proportional representation for elections to the Storting. It consists of the municipalities of Åmli, Arendal, Birkenes, Bygland, Bykle, Evje og Hornnes, Froland, Gjerstad, Grimstad, Iveland, Lillesand, Risør, Tvedestrand, Valle and Vegårshei in the county of Agder. The constituency currently elects three of the 169 members of the Storting using the open party-list proportional representation electoral system. At the 2025 parliamentary election it had 91,325 registered electors.

== Electoral system ==
Aust-Agder currently elects three of the 169 members of the Storting using the open (Note: Although technically elections to the Storting have open lists, they are in effect closed lists as a majority of those voting for a party must make changes to the lists for the changes to take effect, which has never happened since the introduction of proportional representation in 1921, and as result candidates are elected in the order submitted by the party.) party-list proportional representation electoral system. Constituency seats are allocated by the County Electoral Committee using the Modified Sainte-Laguë method. Compensatory seats (seats at large or levelling seats) are calculated based on the national vote and are allocated by the National Electoral Committee using the Modified Sainte-Laguë method at the constituency level (one for each constituency). Only parties that reach the 4% national threshold compete for compensatory seats.

== Election results ==
=== Summary ===
Election	Communists K			Reds R / RV / FMS			Socialist Left SV / SF			Labour Ap			Greens MDG			Centre Sp / Bp / L			Liberals V			Christian Democrats KrF			Conservatives H			Progress FrP / ALP		
Election	Votes	%	Seats	Votes	%	Seats	Votes	%	Seats	Votes	%	Seats	Votes	%	Seats	Votes	%	Seats	Votes	%	Seats	Votes	%	Seats	Votes	%	Seats	Votes	%	Seats
2025				3,305	4.59%	0	2,811	3.91%	0	19,346	26.89%	1	2,432	3.38%	0	3,655	5.08%	0	1,855	2.58%	0	5,824	8.09%	0	9,375	13.03%	1	20,001	27.80%	1
2021				2,456	3.73%	0	3,644	5.54%	0	16,147	24.53%	1	1,976	3.00%	0	8,907	13.53%	1	2,136	3.24%	0	5,749	8.73%	0	13,305	20.21%	1	8,728	13.26%	0
2017				807	1.25%	0	2,562	3.96%	0	16,481	25.44%	1	1,676	2.59%	0	5,385	8.31%	0	2,121	3.27%	0	6,352	9.81%	0	16,614	25.65%	1	11,195	17.28%	1
2013				345	0.55%	0	1,652	2.63%	0	17,623	28.02%	1	1,242	1.97%	0	2,815	4.48%	0	3,033	4.82%	0	7,019	11.16%	0	16,303	25.92%	1	11,278	17.93%	1
2009				377	0.63%	0	2,588	4.34%	0	19,377	32.50%	1	148	0.25%	0	2,609	4.38%	0	2,054	3.44%	0	6,663	11.18%	0	9,721	16.30%	1	15,538	26.06%	1
2005				269	0.46%	0	4,560	7.78%	0	16,987	28.98%	2				3,093	5.28%	0	3,158	5.39%	0	7,452	12.71%	0	7,436	12.69%	0	14,641	24.98%	1
2001	25	0.04%	0	255	0.46%	0	6,215	11.10%	0	11,083	19.80%	1				2,340	4.18%	0	2,188	3.91%	0	11,459	20.47%	1	11,724	20.95%	1	9,273	16.57%	1
1997	36	0.06%	0	421	0.73%	0	2,515	4.36%	0	17,568	30.44%	2	104	0.18%	0	4,718	8.17%	0	2,697	4.67%	0	11,963	20.73%	1	7,651	13.26%	0	9,836	17.04%	1
1993				122	0.22%	0	3,886	7.05%	0	18,244	33.08%	2				9,764	17.71%	1	2,162	3.92%	0	7,621	13.82%	0	8,245	14.95%	1	3,326	6.03%	0
1989				199	0.34%	0	3,870	6.53%	0	18,608	31.40%	1	201	0.34%	0	3,283	5.54%	0	2,600	4.39%	0	9,503	16.04%	1	11,111	18.75%	1	9,714	16.39%	1
1985	45	0.08%	0	106	0.19%	0	1,441	2.52%	0	22,719	39.71%	2				3,297	5.76%	0	2,054	3.59%	0	8,381	14.65%	1	16,734	29.25%	1	2,080	3.64%	0
1981	50	0.09%	0	114	0.21%	0	1,236	2.29%	0	18,519	34.36%	2				2,879	5.34%	0	2,111	3.92%	0	8,938	16.58%	1	17,195	31.90%	1	2,571	4.77%	0
1977	60	0.12%	0	81	0.17%	0	965	1.99%	0	19,037	39.20%	2										16,080	33.11%	1	10,606	21.84%	1	1,613	3.32%	0
1973				70	0.16%	0	2,391	5.42%	0	14,594	33.06%	2							6,296	14.26%	0	8,254	18.70%	1	6,876	15.58%	1	2,044	4.63%	0
1969	126	0.28%	0				611	1.38%	0	19,047	43.01%	2				4,077	9.21%	0	7,202	16.26%	1	5,697	12.86%	0	7,529	17.00%	1			
1965	119	0.28%	0				1,337	3.16%	0	17,556	41.55%	2				2,994	7.09%	0	6,748	15.97%	1	6,214	14.71%	0	7,285	17.24%	1			
1961	324	0.85%	0							16,801	43.82%	2							7,719	20.13%	1	6,433	16.78%	0	7,066	18.43%	1			
1957	363	0.95%	0							16,813	43.91%	2				3,565	9.31%	0	5,555	14.51%	0	5,802	15.15%	1	6,188	16.16%	1			
1953	525	1.33%	0							17,305	43.76%	2							5,560	14.06%	0	6,491	16.42%	1	9,661	24.43%	1			
1949	394	1.25%	0							13,371	42.56%	3				4,008	12.76%	0	7,028	22.37%	1	2,649	8.43%	0	3,967	12.63%	0			
1945	1,053	3.87%	0							11,683	42.97%	2				3,439	12.65%	0	7,082	26.05%	1				3,923	14.43%	1			
1936										9,582	33.92%	1				4,605	16.30%	1	7,819	27.68%	1				5,674	20.09%	1			
1933										8,323	33.69%	1				3,887	15.73%	1	4,787	19.38%	1				4,390	17.77%	1			
1930										6,418	26.90%	1				5,140	21.55%	1	7,022	29.44%	1				5,275	22.11%	1			
1927										6,436	33.88%	1				3,771	19.85%	1	4,756	25.04%	1				4,033	21.23%	1			
1924	115	0.64%	0							3,120	17.45%	1				3,325	18.60%	1	5,731	32.05%	1				4,708	26.33%	1			
1921										2,250	12.24%	0				3,679	20.01%	1	5,393	29.33%	2				5,146	27.99%	1			

(Excludes compensatory seats. Figures in italics represent joint lists.)

=== Detailed ===
==== 2020s ====
===== 2025 =====
Results of the 2025 parliamentary election held on 8 September 2025:

Party		Votes per municipality															Total votes	%	Seats		
Party		Åmli	Arendal	Birke- nes	Bygland	Bykle	Evje og Hornnes	Froland	Gjer- stad	Grim- stad	Iveland	Lille- sand	Risør	Tvede- strand	Valle	Vegår- shei	Total votes	%	Con.	Com.	Tot.
Progress Party	FrP	237	7,588	965	126	123	595	1,276	424	3,937	242	1,837	974	1,133	221	323	20,001	27.80%	1	0	1
Labour Party	Ap	308	8,243	567	158	143	549	861	414	3,411	118	1,649	1,401	1,027	152	345	19,346	26.89%	1	0	1
Conservative Party	H	52	3,815	327	66	79	207	246	149	2,002	40	1,097	624	516	66	89	9,375	13.03%	1	0	1
Christian Democratic Party	KrF	69	1,436	400	59	35	271	374	74	1,678	125	638	143	248	50	224	5,824	8.09%	0	1	1
Centre Party	Sp	174	759	291	183	79	223	227	187	518	125	188	176	207	154	164	3,655	5.08%	0	0	0
Red Party	R	67	1,320	118	32	33	83	129	80	590	27	335	224	193	23	51	3,305	4.59%	0	0	0
Socialist Left Party	SV	28	1,275	70	21	24	54	82	28	598	13	322	129	125	11	31	2,811	3.91%	0	0	0
Green Party	MDG	10	994	67	13	19	29	67	30	602	12	305	138	119	12	15	2,432	3.38%	0	0	0
Liberal Party	V	15	719	48	13	18	32	41	17	445	10	253	115	104	9	16	1,855	2.58%	0	0	0
Conservative	K	30	250	54	19	8	39	132	5	186	26	68	10	22	10	20	879	1.22%	0	0	0
Pensioners' Party	PP	5	213	19	7	2	13	26	9	82	6	94	24	27	7	6	540	0.75%	0	0	0
Industry and Business Party	INP	13	155	46	4	3	11	51	11	118	9	29	22	26	5	13	516	0.72%	0	0	0
Generation Party	GP	9	150	33	6	6	22	25	10	81	13	53	24	31	5	14	482	0.67%	0	0	0
Norway Democrats	ND	14	180	6	5	5	18	31	10	71	11	32	32	31	7	14	467	0.65%	0	0	0
Peace and Justice	FOR	2	58	3	2	1	5	7	3	30	2	13	10	10	3	2	151	0.21%	0	0	0
DNI Party	DNI	1	62	6	2	2	1	12	3	20	4	6	7	7	2	3	138	0.19%	0	0	0
Center Party	PS	1	24	3	2	1	2	5	3	22	0	13	3	11	1	2	93	0.13%	0	0	0
Welfare and Innovation Party	VIP	1	35	3	1	2	4	3	1	15	3	11	5	3	1	0	88	0.12%	0	0	0
Valid votes		1,036	27,276	3,026	719	583	2,158	3,595	1,458	14,406	786	6,943	4,061	3,840	739	1,332	71,958	100.00%	3	1	4
Blank votes		11	158	24	2	4	22	29	9	128	10	49	28	22	5	6	507	0.70%			
Rejected votes – other		2	83	7	0	1	9	8	0	17	3	1	7	0	0	2	140	0.19%			
Total polled		1,049	27,517	3,057	721	588	2,189	3,632	1,467	14,551	799	6,993	4,096	3,862	744	1,340	72,605	79.50%			
Registered electors		1,316	34,865	3,852	892	693	2,770	4,609	1,919	18,219	952	8,649	5,171	4,881	924	1,613	91,325				
Turnout		79.71%	78.92%	79.36%	80.83%	84.85%	79.03%	78.80%	76.45%	79.87%	83.93%	80.85%	79.21%	79.12%	80.52%	83.08%	79.50%				

The following candidates were elected:

- Constituency seats - Tellef Inge Mørland (Ap); Marius Arion Nilsen (FrP); and Haagen Poppe (H).
- Compensatory seat - Jorunn Gleditsch Lossius (KrF).

===== 2021 =====
Results of the 2021 parliamentary election held on 13 September 2021:

Party		Votes per municipality															Total votes	%	Seats		
Party		Åmli	Arendal	Birke- nes	Bygland	Bykle	Evje og Hornnes	Froland	Gjer- stad	Grim- stad	Iveland	Lille- sand	Risør	Tvede- strand	Valle	Vegår- shei	Total votes	%	Con.	Com.	Tot.
Labour Party	Ap	279	6,970	479	147	99	464	690	345	2,730	90	1,336	1,188	869	134	327	16,147	24.53%	1	0	1
Conservative Party	H	78	5,172	532	89	96	271	351	217	2,861	74	1,626	837	832	105	164	13,305	20.21%	1	0	1
Centre Party	Sp	313	2,492	655	222	131	410	732	368	1,281	218	528	456	559	207	335	8,907	13.53%	1	0	1
Progress Party	FrP	112	3,718	315	70	39	242	617	171	1,545	101	698	491	383	94	132	8,728	13.26%	0	1	1
Christian Democratic Party	KrF	70	1,399	394	55	39	311	365	80	1,637	136	647	172	174	74	196	5,749	8.73%	0	0	0
Socialist Left Party	SV	41	1,635	76	35	35	85	90	47	729	15	431	187	175	24	39	3,644	5.54%	0	0	0
Red Party	R	53	1,016	65	35	17	46	90	52	429	23	240	203	137	17	33	2,456	3.73%	0	0	0
Liberal Party	V	20	826	60	9	25	33	48	21	494	11	302	135	127	12	13	2,136	3.24%	0	0	0
Green Party	MDG	9	765	62	6	16	26	49	16	514	10	243	127	105	11	17	1,976	3.00%	0	0	0
Democrats in Norway		16	330	55	12	9	41	66	16	156	22	78	41	52	9	14	917	1.39%	0	0	0
The Christians	PDK	4	177	37	7	4	14	87	6	131	14	43	22	13	2	12	573	0.87%	0	0	0
Pensioners' Party	PP	3	185	9	0	0	5	8	5	46	4	78	21	12	2	2	380	0.58%	0	0	0
Industry and Business Party	INP	10	78	21	6	1	6	29	7	48	7	18	23	19	3	3	279	0.42%	0	0	0
Center Party		2	62	17	2	0	5	9	4	60	2	52	6	6	0	3	230	0.35%	0	0	0
Health Party		0	110	4	1	0	3	8	0	34	0	11	6	11	0	2	190	0.29%	0	0	0
Capitalist Party		2	36	1	0	0	5	7	2	27	1	12	4	3	0	2	102	0.15%	0	0	0
Pirate Party of Norway		1	26	6	1	1	3	1	1	14	0	8	4	4	0	1	71	0.11%	0	0	0
Alliance - Alternative for Norway		0	21	0	1	0	1	1	1	7	0	4	6	2	0	1	45	0.07%	0	0	0
Valid votes		1,013	25,018	2,788	698	512	1,971	3,248	1,359	12,743	728	6,355	3,929	3,483	694	1,296	65,835	100.00%	3	1	4
Blank votes		3	132	16	4	2	11	19	10	76	5	37	15	6	2	4	342	0.52%			
Rejected votes – other		0	40	8	0	1	0	3	3	4	4	5	2	0	0	0	70	0.11%			
Total polled		1,016	25,190	2,812	702	515	1,982	3,270	1,372	12,823	737	6,397	3,946	3,489	696	1,300	66,247	75.88%			
Registered electors		1,321	33,383	3,715	899	661	2,645	4,407	1,865	16,974	926	8,183	5,235	4,609	915	1,562	87,300				
Turnout		76.91%	75.46%	75.69%	78.09%	77.91%	74.93%	74.20%	73.57%	75.54%	79.59%	78.17%	75.38%	75.70%	76.07%	83.23%	75.88%				

The following candidates were elected:

- Constituency seats - Svein Harberg (H); Tellef Inge Mørland (Ap); and Gro-Anita Mykjåland (Sp).
- Compensatory seat - Marius Arion Nilsen (FrP).

==== 2010s ====
===== 2017 =====
Results of the 2017 parliamentary election held on 11 September 2017:

Party		Votes per municipality															Total votes	%	Seats		
Party		Åmli	Arendal	Birke- nes	Bygland	Bykle	Evje og Hornnes	Froland	Gjer- stad	Grim- stad	Iveland	Lille- sand	Risør	Tvede- strand	Valle	Vegår- shei	Total votes	%	Con.	Com.	Tot.
Conservative Party	H	166	6,413	653	125	116	339	559	288	3,351	116	2,111	1,023	993	123	238	16,614	25.65%	1	0	1
Labour Party	Ap	327	7,231	518	172	110	467	690	385	2,558	111	1,279	1,290	877	136	330	16,481	25.44%	1	0	1
Progress Party	FrP	156	4,488	476	93	72	308	698	240	2,239	147	861	635	520	117	145	11,195	17.28%	1	0	1
Christian Democratic Party	KrF	99	1,681	443	79	45	374	437	94	1,623	152	530	243	258	61	233	6,352	9.81%	0	1	1
Centre Party	Sp	217	1,396	346	188	103	266	397	295	781	148	264	272	357	161	194	5,385	8.31%	0	0	0
Socialist Left Party	SV	31	1,149	68	19	27	55	78	36	472	16	287	174	113	12	25	2,562	3.96%	0	0	0
Liberal Party	V	11	763	62	10	21	40	53	25	466	14	379	124	117	16	20	2,121	3.27%	0	0	0
Green Party	MDG	6	640	41	13	18	25	39	19	418	13	186	130	106	10	12	1,676	2.59%	0	0	0
Red Party	R	19	346	32	9	7	16	19	10	120	10	84	69	52	6	8	807	1.25%	0	0	0
The Christians	PDK	6	156	25	8	4	13	60	5	107	15	21	17	17	12	4	470	0.73%	0	0	0
Pensioners' Party	PP	8	214	11	5	1	9	11	5	56	0	79	20	33	0	1	453	0.70%	0	0	0
Health Party		2	144	4	1	3	3	17	6	33	0	22	5	7	0	2	249	0.38%	0	0	0
Capitalist Party		2	59	0	3	1	5	9	2	14	1	21	1	3	0	1	122	0.19%	0	0	0
Democrats in Norway		2	37	2	4	1	5	4	1	31	1	9	2	0	0	3	102	0.16%	0	0	0
Pirate Party of Norway		2	41	6	1	0	2	4	1	24	2	10	5	3	0	1	102	0.16%	0	0	0
The Alliance		2	29	2	0	0	3	4	1	11	1	1	5	2	0	0	61	0.09%	0	0	0
Coastal Party	KP	1	12	1	0	0	1	2	2	2	0	3	0	0	0	0	24	0.04%	0	0	0
Valid votes		1,057	24,799	2,690	730	529	1,931	3,081	1,415	12,306	747	6,147	4,015	3,458	654	1,217	64,776	100.00%	3	1	4
Blank votes		4	128	14	3	5	13	20	7	59	7	28	25	9	3	8	333	0.51%			
Rejected votes – other		0	11	11	0	1	10	2	11	17	1	6	15	7	3	2	97	0.15%			
Total polled		1,061	24,938	2,715	733	535	1,954	3,103	1,433	12,382	755	6,181	4,055	3,474	660	1,227	65,206	77.23%			
Registered electors		1,332	32,534	3,605	934	668	2,587	4,119	1,865	15,968	933	7,707	5,275	4,498	910	1,491	84,426				
Turnout		79.65%	76.65%	75.31%	78.48%	80.09%	75.53%	75.33%	76.84%	77.54%	80.92%	80.20%	76.87%	77.23%	72.53%	82.29%	77.23%				

The following candidates were elected:

- Constituency seats - Åshild Bruun-Gundersen (FrP); Svein Harberg (H); and Tellef Inge Mørland (Ap).
- Compensatory seat - Kjell Ingolf Ropstad (KrF).

===== 2013 =====
Results of the 2013 parliamentary election held on 8 and 9 September 2013:

Party		Votes per municipality															Total votes	%	Seats		
Party		Åmli	Arendal	Birke- nes	Bygland	Bykle	Evje og Hornnes	Froland	Gjer- stad	Grim- stad	Iveland	Lille- sand	Risør	Tvede- strand	Valle	Vegår- shei	Total votes	%	Con.	Com.	Tot.
Labour Party	Ap	385	7,630	494	214	138	568	844	459	2,534	144	1,278	1,411	971	175	378	17,623	28.02%	1	0	1
Conservative Party	H	126	6,205	749	132	119	336	479	298	3,223	136	2,213	970	945	132	240	16,303	25.92%	1	0	1
Progress Party	FrP	145	4,672	425	91	62	298	635	260	2,217	160	817	653	605	95	143	11,278	17.93%	1	0	1
Christian Democratic Party	KrF	95	2,051	476	94	44	377	431	122	1,721	152	547	273	320	82	234	7,019	11.16%	0	1	1
Liberal Party	V	32	1,210	73	22	23	48	57	56	690	17	363	224	165	25	28	3,033	4.82%	0	0	0
Centre Party	Sp	156	607	202	137	57	140	235	135	376	87	115	125	192	126	125	2,815	4.48%	0	0	0
Socialist Left Party	SV	28	731	31	13	23	27	45	29	284	9	192	118	101	14	7	1,652	2.63%	0	0	0
Green Party	MDG	5	515	49	7	13	28	35	16	222	9	136	94	87	10	16	1,242	1.97%	0	0	0
The Christians	PDK	22	266	45	14	10	27	93	21	166	26	62	36	36	26	12	862	1.37%	0	0	0
Pensioners' Party	PP	6	203	6	5	1	9	14	7	40	3	32	11	11	2	4	354	0.56%	0	0	0
Red Party	R	12	150	8	4	3	3	8	8	53	9	25	41	15	3	3	345	0.55%	0	0	0
Pirate Party of Norway		1	86	6	3	0	7	4	3	36	2	12	10	4	0	2	176	0.28%	0	0	0
Christian Unity Party	KSP	4	39	5	1	0	9	6	2	15	2	6	11	10	3	4	117	0.19%	0	0	0
Democrats in Norway		1	12	3	3	0	0	1	1	9	1	9	0	4	0	2	46	0.07%	0	0	0
Coastal Party	KP	1	10	1	0	0	6	3	1	3	0	5	2	2	1	0	35	0.06%	0	0	0
Valid votes		1,019	24,387	2,573	740	493	1,883	2,890	1,418	11,589	757	5,812	3,979	3,468	694	1,198	62,900	100.00%	3	1	4
Blank votes		6	130	18	1	4	11	14	6	53	5	8	29	22	3	5	315	0.50%			
Rejected votes – other		1	68	5	0	2	0	2	3	6	0	3	17	3	0	0	110	0.17%			
Total polled		1,026	24,585	2,596	741	499	1,894	2,906	1,427	11,648	762	5,823	4,025	3,493	697	1,203	63,325	77.35%			
Registered electors		1,306	31,832	3,444	922	637	2,526	3,869	1,856	15,176	928	7,245	5,202	4,514	946	1,461	81,864				
Turnout		78.56%	77.23%	75.38%	80.37%	78.34%	74.98%	75.11%	76.89%	76.75%	82.11%	80.37%	77.37%	77.38%	73.68%	82.34%	77.35%				

The following candidates were elected:

- Constituency seats - Freddy de Ruiter (Ap); Ingebjørg Godskesen (FrP); and Svein Harberg (H).
- Compensatory seat - Kjell Ingolf Ropstad (KrF).

==== 2000s ====
===== 2009 =====
Results of the 2009 parliamentary election held on 13 and 14 September 2009:

Party		Votes per municipality															Total votes	%	Seats		
Party		Åmli	Arendal	Birke- nes	Bygland	Bykle	Evje og Hornnes	Froland	Gjer- stad	Grim- stad	Iveland	Lille- sand	Risør	Tvede- strand	Valle	Vegår- shei	Total votes	%	Con.	Com.	Tot.
Labour Party	Ap	409	8,426	598	215	143	635	807	504	2,867	138	1,415	1,518	1,081	191	430	19,377	32.50%	1	0	1
Progress Party	FrP	199	6,215	666	126	96	421	812	309	3,007	204	1,404	889	823	159	208	15,538	26.06%	1	0	1
Conservative Party	H	96	3,688	438	103	81	182	215	158	1,938	84	1,238	585	666	90	159	9,721	16.30%	1	0	1
Christian Democratic Party	KrF	95	1,876	446	95	57	409	369	122	1,572	162	552	322	263	95	228	6,663	11.18%	0	1	1
Centre Party	Sp	140	582	181	104	44	109	225	138	351	74	138	139	170	119	95	2,609	4.38%	0	0	0
Socialist Left Party	SV	60	1,029	72	23	28	47	65	74	404	9	312	263	177	12	13	2,588	4.34%	0	0	0
Liberal Party	V	16	756	50	21	16	25	60	41	489	14	250	169	116	8	23	2,054	3.44%	0	0	0
Red Party	R	8	148	7	5	1	3	11	6	44	6	35	73	26	3	1	377	0.63%	0	0	0
Pensioners' Party	PP	3	184	7	1	0	9	10	6	32	0	14	17	14	4	3	304	0.51%	0	0	0
Christian Unity Party	KSP	4	54	10	5	4	1	6	2	37	3	13	9	10	4	2	164	0.28%	0	0	0
Green Party	MDG	1	42	4	0	3	9	1	5	26	0	27	9	20	1	0	148	0.25%	0	0	0
Democrats in Norway		0	11	5	2	0	1	3	1	7	0	6	4	7	1	0	48	0.08%	0	0	0
Coastal Party	KP	0	11	1	3	1	2	1	2	4	0	3	2	1	0	1	32	0.05%	0	0	0
Valid votes		1,031	23,022	2,485	703	474	1,853	2,585	1,368	10,778	694	5,407	3,999	3,374	687	1,163	59,623	100.00%	3	1	4
Blank votes		6	84	13	6	0	4	10	5	37	1	19	14	14	1	5	219	0.37%			
Rejected votes – other		0	12	4	0	0	0	2	0	3	0	0	4	3	0	0	28	0.05%			
Total polled		1,037	23,118	2,502	709	474	1,857	2,597	1,373	10,818	695	5,426	4,017	3,391	688	1,168	59,870	75.32%			
Registered electors		1,362	30,963	3,276	963	666	2,450	3,552	1,869	14,407	892	6,918	5,280	4,525	970	1,396	79,489				
Turnout		76.14%	74.66%	76.37%	73.62%	71.17%	75.80%	73.11%	73.46%	75.09%	77.91%	78.43%	76.08%	74.94%	70.93%	83.67%	75.32%				

The following candidates were elected:

- Constituency seats - Freddy de Ruiter (Ap); Ingebjørg Godskesen (FrP); and Svein Harberg (H).
- Compensatory seat - Kjell Ingolf Ropstad (KrF).

===== 2005 =====
Results of the 2005 parliamentary election held on 11 and 12 September 2005:

Party		Votes per municipality															Total votes	%	Seats		
Party		Åmli	Arendal	Birke- nes	Bygland	Bykle	Evje og Hornnes	Froland	Gjer- stad	Grim- stad	Iveland	Lille- sand	Risør	Tvede- strand	Valle	Vegår- shei	Total votes	%	Con.	Com.	Tot.
Labour Party	Ap	401	7,406	539	197	110	577	738	493	2,304	118	1,236	1,347	957	176	388	16,987	28.98%	2	0	2
Progress Party	FrP	199	5,752	551	118	100	421	769	288	2,908	183	1,336	841	802	174	199	14,641	24.98%	1	0	1
Christian Democratic Party	KrF	82	2,161	474	106	59	357	392	143	1,831	153	628	368	359	103	236	7,452	12.71%	0	1	1
Conservative Party	H	58	3,074	322	77	54	134	151	158	1,385	51	918	493	409	48	104	7,436	12.69%	0	0	0
Socialist Left Party	SV	82	1,944	128	27	41	100	124	114	736	17	454	371	340	35	47	4,560	7.78%	0	0	0
Liberal Party	V	32	1,121	128	27	16	80	103	44	626	48	386	214	263	27	43	3,158	5.39%	0	0	0
Centre Party	Sp	168	667	203	187	60	162	217	126	407	80	212	193	181	138	92	3,093	5.28%	0	0	0
Pensioners' Party	PP	3	274	1	0	1	6	13	12	60	1	15	61	33	3	6	489	0.83%	0	0	0
Red Electoral Alliance	RV	6	107	12	1	4	8	7	5	32	4	23	38	19	3	0	269	0.46%	0	0	0
Coastal Party	KP	2	60	11	2	1	4	9	6	33	0	16	17	9	2	2	174	0.30%	0	0	0
Christian Unity Party	KSP	0	53	8	2	2	8	10	3	25	4	15	7	10	5	5	157	0.27%	0	0	0
Abortion Opponents' List		2	30	11	3	5	5	8	2	23	3	9	9	10	6	4	130	0.22%	0	0	0
Democrats		1	25	6	2	0	1	2	1	4	4	4	5	7	0	3	65	0.11%	0	0	0
Valid votes		1,036	22,674	2,394	749	453	1,863	2,543	1,395	10,374	666	5,252	3,964	3,399	720	1,129	58,611	100.00%	3	1	4
Blank votes		7	79	10	6	2	5	9	7	50	2	21	22	6	2	0	228	0.39%			
Rejected votes – other		1	5	1	0	4	0	0	2	7	0	4	2	1	1	0	28	0.05%			
Total polled		1,044	22,758	2,405	755	459	1,868	2,552	1,404	10,431	668	5,277	3,988	3,406	723	1,129	58,867	76.19%			
Registered electors		1,360	29,980	3,088	993	614	2,455	3,411	1,890	13,726	843	6,702	5,281	4,514	1,035	1,372	77,264				
Turnout		76.76%	75.91%	77.88%	76.03%	74.76%	76.09%	74.82%	74.29%	75.99%	79.24%	78.74%	75.52%	75.45%	69.86%	82.29%	76.19%				

The following candidates were elected:

- Constituency seats - Torbjørn Andersen (FrP); Freddy de Ruiter (Ap); and Inger Løite (Ap).
- Compensatory seat - Åse Gunhild Woie Duesund (KrF).

===== 2001 =====
Results of the 2001 parliamentary election held on 9 and 10 September 2001:

Party		Votes per municipality															Total votes	%	Seats		
Party		Åmli	Arendal	Birke- nes	Bygland	Bykle	Evje og Hornnes	Froland	Gjer- stad	Grim- stad	Iveland	Lille- sand	Risør	Tvede- strand	Valle	Vegår- shei	Total votes	%	Con.	Com.	Tot.
Conservative Party	H	102	4,845	438	105	77	294	268	289	2,185	85	1,247	804	722	87	176	11,724	20.95%	1	0	1
Christian Democratic Party	KrF	167	3,588	706	169	90	493	626	238	2,395	214	972	674	611	195	321	11,459	20.47%	1	0	1
Labour Party	Ap	323	4,580	408	115	73	345	467	347	1,394	89	787	1,028	695	145	287	11,083	19.80%	1	0	1
Progress Party	FrP	133	4,004	311	75	62	184	535	162	1,778	84	654	568	506	86	131	9,273	16.57%	1	0	1
Socialist Left Party	SV	139	2,683	166	76	56	162	217	131	898	34	664	477	362	73	77	6,215	11.10%	0	0	0
Centre Party	Sp	155	433	164	126	43	118	145	105	335	67	153	118	167	147	64	2,340	4.18%	0	0	0
Liberal Party	V	13	796	104	16	8	55	81	44	367	28	300	191	135	23	27	2,188	3.91%	0	0	0
The Political Party	DPP	6	197	19	5	0	11	11	12	77	9	50	46	19	1	2	465	0.83%	0	0	0
Coastal Party	KP	4	121	18	11	3	16	16	7	62	10	48	36	20	5	3	380	0.68%	0	0	0
Christian Unity Party	KSP	6	67	17	4	3	23	21	5	46	6	11	16	21	8	5	259	0.46%	0	0	0
Red Electoral Alliance	RV	5	113	10	1	1	6	4	3	38	3	26	31	11	1	2	255	0.46%	0	0	0
County Lists		8	103	14	3	1	11	0	2	18	9	18	5	0	5	3	200	0.36%	0	0	0
Fatherland Party	FLP	1	23	3	2	1	3	3	5	12	0	1	4	1	0	0	59	0.11%	0	0	0
Norwegian People's Party	NFP	0	17	2	1	2	4	0	0	3	0	2	1	2	1	0	35	0.06%	0	0	0
Communist Party of Norway	K	0	12	0	0	0	0	0	1	5	0	1	3	1	2	0	25	0.04%	0	0	0
Liberal People's Party	DLF	0	5	0	1	0	0	1	0	2	0	1	3	1	0	0	14	0.03%	0	0	0
Valid votes		1,062	21,587	2,380	710	420	1,725	2,395	1,351	9,615	638	4,935	4,005	3,274	779	1,098	55,974	100.00%	4	0	4
Rejected votes		3	62	8	4	12	46	9	6	40	2	13	24	23	2	5	259	0.46%			
Total polled		1,065	21,649	2,388	714	432	1,771	2,404	1,357	9,655	640	4,948	4,029	3,297	781	1,103	56,233	73.57%			
Registered electors		1,410	29,785	3,074	1,012	616	2,506	3,312	1,910	13,107	811	6,576	5,401	4,453	1,106	1,357	76,436				
Turnout		75.53%	72.68%	77.68%	70.55%	70.13%	70.67%	72.58%	71.05%	73.66%	78.91%	75.24%	74.60%	74.04%	70.61%	81.28%	73.57%				

The following candidates were elected:

- Constituency seats - Torbjørn Andersen (FrP); Åse Gunhild Woie Duesund (KrF); Gunnar Halvorsen (Ap); and Jan Olav Olsen (H).

==== 1990s ====
===== 1997 =====
Results of the 1997 parliamentary election held on 15 September 1997:

Party		Votes per municipality															Total votes	%	Seats		
Party		Åmli	Arendal	Birke- nes	Bygland	Bykle	Evje og Hornnes	Froland	Gjer- stad	Grim- stad	Iveland	Lille- sand	Risør	Tvede- strand	Valle	Vegår- shei	Total votes	%	Con.	Com.	Tot.
Labour Party	Ap	425	7,359	579	193	120	636	726	539	2,432	133	1,271	1,494	1,051	215	395	17,568	30.44%	2	0	2
Christian Democratic Party	KrF	177	3,947	705	173	88	462	663	291	2,417	196	1,071	680	596	184	313	11,963	20.73%	1	0	1
Progress Party	FrP	114	4,556	291	79	38	238	401	174	1,670	81	800	605	610	67	112	9,836	17.04%	1	0	1
Conservative Party	H	53	3,176	362	64	46	194	150	138	1,373	48	903	456	500	61	127	7,651	13.26%	0	0	0
Centre Party	Sp	226	1,040	330	206	117	219	291	181	806	112	258	264	310	227	131	4,718	8.17%	0	0	0
Liberal Party	V	23	1,054	83	20	16	65	88	76	366	44	287	315	198	18	44	2,697	4.67%	0	0	0
Socialist Left Party	SV	85	1,086	54	27	28	65	80	51	364	17	266	197	150	25	20	2,515	4.36%	0	0	0
Red Electoral Alliance	RV	9	179	9	7	0	4	14	3	38	2	60	63	26	3	4	421	0.73%	0	0	0
Fatherland Party	FLP	1	38	5	1	0	3	4	5	23	0	5	13	8	2	1	109	0.19%	0	0	0
Green Party	MDG	0	41	2	1	0	2	4	0	19	4	12	13	6	0	0	104	0.18%	0	0	0
Natural Law Party		0	46	1	0	0	1	3	0	23	0	8	5	7	0	1	95	0.16%	0	0	0
Communist Party of Norway	K	0	18	0	0	0	1	0	1	6	0	4	5	0	0	1	36	0.06%	0	0	0
Valid votes		1,113	22,540	2,421	771	453	1,890	2,424	1,459	9,537	637	4,945	4,110	3,462	802	1,149	57,713	100.00%	4	0	4
Rejected votes		4	63	8	3	1	11	9	5	22	1	18	28	28	4	0	205	0.35%			
Total polled		1,117	22,603	2,429	774	454	1,901	2,433	1,464	9,559	638	4,963	4,138	3,490	806	1,149	57,918	77.08%			
Registered electors		1,424	29,501	2,993	1,045	626	2,495	3,200	1,950	12,536	768	6,325	5,353	4,439	1,124	1,359	75,138				
Turnout		78.44%	76.62%	81.16%	74.07%	72.52%	76.19%	76.03%	75.08%	76.25%	83.07%	78.47%	77.30%	78.62%	71.71%	84.55%	77.08%				

The following candidates were elected:

- Constituency seats - Torbjørn Andersen (FrP); Åse Gunhild Woie Duesund (KrF); Gunnar Halvorsen (Ap); and Liv Marit Moland (Ap).

===== 1993 =====
Results of the 1993 parliamentary election held on 12 and 13 September 1993:

Party		Votes per municipality															Total votes	%	Seats		
Party		Åmli	Arendal	Birke- nes	Bygland	Bykle	Evje og Hornnes	Froland	Gjer- stad	Grim- stad	Iveland	Lille- sand	Risør	Tvede- strand	Valle	Vegår- shei	Total votes	%	Con.	Com.	Tot.
Labour Party	Ap	459	7,991	570	256	135	710	772	477	2,247	151	1,359	1,403	1,057	245	412	18,244	33.08%	2	0	2
Centre Party	Sp	317	2,696	597	256	129	401	698	370	1,652	190	602	618	605	334	299	9,764	17.71%	1	0	1
Conservative Party	H	45	3,543	279	56	41	223	143	124	1,506	44	1,045	527	499	55	115	8,245	14.95%	1	0	1
Christian Democratic Party	KrF	124	2,391	532	98	48	296	353	197	1,524	144	675	465	414	131	229	7,621	13.82%	0	0	0
Socialist Left Party	SV	113	1,539	122	52	37	106	167	132	527	29	378	320	273	43	48	3,886	7.05%	0	0	0
Progress Party	FrP	38	1,443	106	27	27	80	97	50	564	25	290	231	276	45	27	3,326	6.03%	0	0	0
Liberal Party	V	16	887	61	17	12	52	58	60	338	21	234	209	153	12	32	2,162	3.92%	0	0	0
Pensioners' Party	PP	7	563	21	10	3	29	27	14	123	3	118	66	50	7	7	1,048	1.90%	0	0	0
Fatherland Party	FLP	2	120	5	5	1	7	4	4	47	5	15	13	14	1	0	243	0.44%	0	0	0
New Future Coalition Party	SNF	7	95	6	0	1	2	0	2	48	4	18	5	5	0	1	194	0.35%	0	0	0
Freedom Party against the EU		4	52	16	2	0	3	7	3	38	1	8	11	8	1	12	166	0.30%	0	0	0
Christian Conservative Party	KKP	2	47	9	1	2	2	5	2	19	0	10	14	3	4	7	127	0.23%	0	0	0
Red Electoral Alliance	RV	1	59	2	2	2	2	3	1	9	1	11	24	5	0	0	122	0.22%	0	0	0
Valid votes		1,135	21,426	2,326	782	438	1,913	2,334	1,436	8,642	618	4,763	3,906	3,362	878	1,189	55,148	100.00%	4	0	4
Rejected votes		1	57	5	0	2	4	7	2	25	0	11	20	19	1	2	156	0.28%			
Total polled		1,136	21,483	2,331	782	440	1,917	2,341	1,438	8,667	618	4,774	3,926	3,381	879	1,191	55,304	75.31%			
Registered electors		1,453	28,940	2,908	1,028	594	2,468	3,127	1,955	11,885	731	6,051	5,371	4,443	1,120	1,365	73,439				
Turnout		78.18%	74.23%	80.16%	76.07%	74.07%	77.67%	74.86%	73.55%	72.92%	84.54%	78.90%	73.10%	76.10%	78.48%	87.25%	75.31%				

The following candidates were elected:

- Constituency seats - Gunnar Halvorsen (Ap); Brit Hoel (Ap); Tore A. Liltved (H); and Terje Sandkjær (Sp).

==== 1980s ====
===== 1989 =====
Results of the 1989 parliamentary election held on 10 and 11 September 1989:

Party		Votes	%	Seats		
Party		Votes	%	Con.	Com.	Tot.
Labour Party	Ap	18,608	31.40%	1	0	1
Conservative Party	H	11,111	18.75%	1	0	1
Progress Party	FrP	9,714	16.39%	1	0	1
Christian Democratic Party	KrF	9,503	16.04%	1	0	1
Socialist Left Party	SV	3,870	6.53%	0	0	0
Centre Party	Sp	3,283	5.54%	0	0	0
Liberal Party	V	2,600	4.39%	0	0	0
Green Party	MDG	201	0.34%	0	0	0
County Lists for Environment and Solidarity	FMS	199	0.34%	0	0	0
Stop Immigration	SI	163	0.28%	0	0	0
Valid votes		59,252	100.00%	4	0	4
Rejected votes		98	0.17%			
Total polled		59,350	83.45%			
Registered electors		71,123				

The following candidates were elected:

- Constituency seats - Helga Haugen (KrF); Brit Hoel (Ap); Tore A. Liltved (H); and Jens Marcussen (FrP).

===== 1985 =====
Results of the 1985 parliamentary election held on 8 and 9 September 1985:

Party		Party			List Alliance		
Party		Votes	%	Seats	Votes	%	Seats
Labour Party	Ap	22,719	39.71%	2	22,719	39.81%	2
Conservative Party	H	16,734	29.25%	1	16,734	29.32%	1
Christian Democratic Party	KrF	8,381	14.65%	1	11,537	20.22%	1
Centre Party	Sp	3,297	5.76%	0	11,537	20.22%	1
Progress Party	FrP	2,080	3.64%	0	2,080	3.64%	0
Liberal Party	V	2,054	3.59%	0	2,054	3.60%	0
Socialist Left Party	SV	1,441	2.52%	0	1,441	2.53%	0
Liberal People's Party	DLF	350	0.61%	0	350	0.61%	0
Red Electoral Alliance	RV	106	0.19%	0	106	0.19%	0
Communist Party of Norway	K	45	0.08%	0	45	0.08%	0
Valid votes		57,207	100.00%	4	57,066	100.00%	4
Rejected votes		56	0.10%				
Total polled		57,263	83.70%				
Registered electors		68,412					

As the list alliance was not entitled to more seats contesting as an alliance than it was contesting as individual parties, the distribution of seats was as party votes.

The following candidates were elected: Asbjørn Andersen (Ap); Astrid Gjertsen (H); Helga Haugen (KrF); and Brit Hoel (Ap).

===== 1981 =====
Results of the 1981 parliamentary election held on 13 and 14 September 1981:

Party		Votes	%	Seats
Labour Party	Ap	18,519	34.36%	2
Conservative Party	H	17,195	31.90%	1
Christian Democratic Party	KrF	8,938	16.58%	1
Centre Party	Sp	2,879	5.34%	0
Progress Party	FrP	2,571	4.77%	0
Liberal Party	V	2,111	3.92%	0
Socialist Left Party	SV	1,236	2.29%	0
Liberal People's Party	DLF	257	0.48%	0
Red Electoral Alliance	RV	114	0.21%	0
Communist Party of Norway	K	50	0.09%	0
Plebiscite Party		14	0.03%	0
Free Elected Representatives		13	0.02%	0
Valid votes		53,897	100.00%	4
Rejected votes		51	0.09%	
Total polled		53,948	82.75%	
Registered electors		65,192		

The following candidates were elected: Osmund Faremo (Ap); Astrid Gjertsen (H); Brit Hoel (Ap); and Johannes Vågsnes (KrF).

==== 1970s ====
===== 1977 =====
Results of the 1977 parliamentary election held on 11 and 12 September 1977:

Party		Votes	%	Seats
Labour Party	Ap	19,037	39.20%	2
Christian Democratic Party, Liberal Party, Centre Party and New People's Party	KrF-V-Sp-DNF	16,080	33.11%	1
Conservative Party	H	10,606	21.84%	1
Progress Party	FrP	1,613	3.32%	0
Socialist Left Party	SV	965	1.99%	0
Red Electoral Alliance	RV	81	0.17%	0
Communist Party of Norway	K	60	0.12%	0
Free Elected Representatives		53	0.11%	0
Norwegian Democratic Party		38	0.08%	0
Single Person's Party		29	0.06%	0
Valid votes		48,562	100.00%	4
Rejected votes		77	0.16%	
Total polled		48,639	82.16%	
Registered electors		59,203		

The following candidates were elected: Osmund Faremo (Ap); Astrid Gjertsen (H); Thor Lund (Ap); and Johannes Vågsnes (KrF-V-Sp-DNF).

===== 1973 =====
Results of the 1973 parliamentary election held on 9 and 10 September 1973:

Party		Votes	%	Seats
Labour Party	Ap	14,594	33.06%	2
Christian Democratic Party	KrF	8,254	18.70%	1
Conservative Party	H	6,876	15.58%	1
Liberal Party and Centre Party	V-Sp	6,296	14.26%	0
New People's Party	DNF	3,436	7.78%	0
Socialist Electoral League	SV	2,391	5.42%	0
Anders Lange's Party	ALP	2,044	4.63%	0
Red Electoral Alliance	RV	70	0.16%	0
Single Person's Party		62	0.14%	0
Norwegian Democratic Party		59	0.13%	0
Women's Free Elected Representatives		57	0.13%	0
Valid votes		44,139	100.00%	4
Rejected votes		80	0.18%	
Total polled		44,219	78.46%	
Registered electors		56,360		

The following candidates were elected: Osmund Faremo (Ap); Astrid Gjertsen (H); Thor Lund (Ap); and Johannes Vågsnes (KrF).

==== 1960s ====
===== 1969 =====
Results of the 1969 parliamentary election held on 7 and 8 September 1969:

Party		Votes	%	Seats
Labour Party	Ap	19,047	43.01%	2
Conservative Party	H	7,529	17.00%	1
Liberal Party	V	7,202	16.26%	1
Christian Democratic Party	KrF	5,697	12.86%	0
Centre Party	Sp	4,077	9.21%	0
Socialist People's Party	SF	611	1.38%	0
Communist Party of Norway	K	126	0.28%	0
Valid votes		44,289	100.00%	4
Rejected votes		89	0.20%	
Total polled		44,378	82.37%	
Registered electors		53,878		

The following candidates were elected: Øyvind Bjorvatn (V); Osmund Faremo (Ap); Thor Lund (Ap); and Alfred Thommesen (H).

===== 1965 =====
Results of the 1965 parliamentary election held on 12 and 13 September 1965:

Party		Votes	%	Seats
Labour Party	Ap	17,556	41.55%	2
Conservative Party	H	7,285	17.24%	1
Liberal Party	V	6,748	15.97%	1
Christian Democratic Party	KrF	6,214	14.71%	0
Centre Party	Sp	2,994	7.09%	0
Socialist People's Party	SF	1,337	3.16%	0
Communist Party of Norway	K	119	0.28%	0
Valid votes		42,253	100.00%	4
Rejected votes		253	0.60%	
Total polled		42,506	84.15%	
Registered electors		50,511		

The following candidates were elected: Øyvind Bjorvatn (V); Osmund Faremo (Ap); Bjarne Henry Henriksen (Ap); and Alfred Thommesen (H).

===== 1961 =====
Results of the 1961 parliamentary election held on 11 September 1961:

Party		Votes	%	Seats
Labour Party	Ap	16,801	43.82%	2
Liberal Party and Centre Party	V-Sp	7,719	20.13%	1
Conservative Party	H	7,066	18.43%	1
Christian Democratic Party	KrF	6,433	16.78%	0
Communist Party of Norway	K	324	0.85%	0
Valid votes		38,343	100.00%	4
Rejected votes		261	0.68%	
Total polled		38,604	76.74%	
Registered electors		50,307		

The following candidates were elected: Magnhild Hagelia (Ap), 16,799 votes; Bjarne Henry Henriksen (Ap), 16,794 votes; Berge Helle Kringlebotn (V-Sp), 7,715 votes; and Alfred Thommesen (H), 7,066 votes.

==== 1950s ====
===== 1957 =====
Results of the 1957 parliamentary election held on 7 October 1957:

Party		Votes	%	Seats
Labour Party	Ap	16,813	43.91%	2
Conservative Party	H	6,188	16.16%	1
Christian Democratic Party	KrF	5,802	15.15%	1
Liberal Party	V	5,555	14.51%	0
Farmers' Party	Bp	3,565	9.31%	0
Communist Party of Norway	K	363	0.95%	0
Valid votes		38,286	100.00%	4
Rejected votes		226	0.59%	
Total polled		38,512	75.98%	
Registered electors		50,686		

The following candidates were elected: Birger Breivik (KrF); Magnhild Hagelia (Ap); Bjarne Henry Henriksen (Ap); and Alfred Thommesen (H).

===== 1953 =====
Results of the 1953 parliamentary election held on 12 October 1953:

Party		Votes	%	Seats
Labour Party	Ap	17,305	43.76%	2
Conservative Party and Farmers' Party	H-Bp	9,661	24.43%	1
Christian Democratic Party	KrF	6,491	16.42%	1
Liberal Party	V	5,560	14.06%	0
Communist Party of Norway	K	525	1.33%	0
Valid votes		39,542	100.00%	4
Rejected votes		235	0.59%	
Total polled		39,777	77.10%	
Registered electors		51,594		

The following candidates were elected: Magnhild Hagelia (Ap); Bjarne Henry Henriksen (Ap); Arnt J. Mørland (KrF); and Arne Leonhard Nilsen (H-Bp).

==== 1940s ====
===== 1949 =====
Results of the 1949 parliamentary election held on 10 October 1949:

Party		Votes	%	Seats
Labour Party	Ap	13,371	42.56%	3
Liberal Party	V	7,028	22.37%	1
Farmers' Party	Bp	4,008	12.76%	0
Conservative Party	H	3,967	12.63%	0
Christian Democratic Party	KrF	2,649	8.43%	0
Communist Party of Norway	K	394	1.25%	0
Wild Votes		1	0.00%	0
Valid votes		31,418	100.00%	4
Rejected votes		284	0.90%	
Total polled		31,702	80.24%	
Registered electors		39,511		

The following candidates were elected: Torvald Haavardstad (Ap); Magnhild Hagelia (Ap); Einar Iveland (V); and Olav Kjetilson Nylund (Ap).

===== 1945 =====
Results of the 1945 parliamentary election held on 8 October 1945:

Party		Party			List Alliance		
Party		Votes	%	Seats	Votes	%	Seats
Labour Party	Ap	11,683	42.97%	2	11,683	42.99%	2
Liberal Party	V	7,082	26.05%	1	7,082	26.06%	1
Conservative Party	H	3,923	14.43%	1	7,355	27.06%	1
Farmers' Party	Bp	3,439	12.65%	0	7,355	27.06%	1
Communist Party of Norway	K	1,053	3.87%	0	1,053	3.87%	0
Wild Votes		6	0.02%	0	6	0.02%	0
Valid votes		27,186	100.00%	4	27,179	100.00%	4
Rejected votes		249	0.91%				
Total polled		27,435	72.56%				
Registered electors		37,808					

As the list alliance was not entitled to more seats contesting as an alliance than it was contesting as individual parties, the distribution of seats was as party votes.

The following candidates were elected: Anders Tjøstolvsen Noddeland (V); Olav Kjetilson Nylund (Ap); Aani Aanisson Rysstad (Ap); and Søren Hans Smith Sørensen (H).

==== 1930s ====
===== 1936 =====
Results of the 1936 parliamentary election held on 19 October 1936:

Party		Party			List Alliance		
Party		Votes	%	Seats	Votes	%	Seats
Labour Party	Ap	9,582	33.92%	2	9,582	33.94%	1
Liberal Party	V	7,819	27.68%	1	7,819	27.69%	1
Conservative Party	H	5,674	20.09%	1	10,618	37.61%	2
Farmers' Party	Bp	4,605	16.30%	0	10,618	37.61%	2
Fatherland League	Fl	349	1.24%	0	10,618	37.61%	2
Nasjonal Samling	NS	215	0.76%	0	215	0.76%	0
Wild Votes		1	0.00%	0	1	0.00%	0
Valid votes		28,245	100.00%	4	28,235	100.00%	4
Rejected votes		208	0.73%				
Total polled		28,453	82.29%				
Registered electors		34,577					

As the list alliance was entitled to more seats contesting as an alliance than it was contesting as individual parties, the distribution of seats was as list alliance votes. The H-Bp-Fl list alliance's additional seat was allocated to the Farmers' Party.

The following candidates were elected: Julius Grasåsen (Bp); Torvald Haavardstad (Ap); Jakob Ørbæk (H); and Christian Stray (V).

===== 1933 =====
Results of the 1933 parliamentary election held on 16 October 1933:

Party		Party			List Alliance		
Party		Votes	%	Seats	Votes	%	Seats
Labour Party	Ap	8,323	33.69%	2	8,323	33.72%	1
Liberal Party	V	4,787	19.38%	1	4,787	19.40%	1
Conservative Party	H	4,390	17.77%	1	4,390	17.79%	1
Farmers' Party	Bp	3,887	15.73%	0	4,297	17.41%	1
Nasjonal Samling–Villagers	NS-B	436	1.76%	0	4,297	17.41%	1
Aust-Agder Democratic Left	DV	2,883	11.67%	0	2,883	11.68%	0
Valid votes		24,706	100.00%	4	24,680	100.00%	4
Rejected votes		146					
Total polled		24,852					
Registered electors		34,228					

As the list alliance was entitled to more seats contesting as an alliance than it was contesting as individual parties, the distribution of seats was as list alliance votes. The Bp-NS-B list alliance's additional seat was allocated to the Farmers' Party.

The following candidates were elected: Torvald Haavardstad (Ap); Nils Nersten (Bp); Jakob Ørbæk (H); and Christian Stray (V).

===== 1930 =====
Results of the 1930 parliamentary election held on 20 October 1930:

Party		Votes	%	Seats
Liberal Party	V	7,022	29.44%	1
Labour Party	Ap	6,418	26.90%	1
Conservative Party	H	5,275	22.11%	1
Farmers' Party	Bp	5,140	21.55%	1
Valid votes		23,855	100.00%	4
Rejected votes		150	0.62%	
Total polled		24,005	73.19%	
Registered electors		32,797		

The following candidates were elected: Torvald Haavardstad (Ap); Halvor Rolvsson Olstad (Bp); Jakob Ørbæk (H); and Torjus Værland (V).

==== 1920s ====
===== 1927 =====
Results of the 1927 parliamentary election held on 17 October 1927:

Party		Votes	%	Seats
Labour Party	Ap	6,436	33.88%	1
Liberal Party	V	4,756	25.04%	1
Conservative Party	H	4,033	21.23%	1
Farmers' Party	Bp	3,771	19.85%	1
Valid votes		18,996	100.00%	4
Rejected votes		210	1.09%	
Total polled		19,206	59.60%	
Registered electors		32,227		

The following candidates were elected: Nils Hjelmtveit (Ap); Halvor Rolvsson Olstad (Bp); Jakob Ørbæk (H); and Torjus Værland (V).

===== 1924 =====
Results of the 1924 parliamentary election held on 21 October 1924:

Party		Votes	%	Seats
Liberal Party	V	5,731	32.05%	1
Conservative Party	H	4,708	26.33%	1
Farmers' Party	Bp	3,325	18.60%	1
Labour Party	Ap	3,120	17.45%	1
Social Democratic Labour Party of Norway	S	625	3.50%	0
Radical People's Party	RF	256	1.43%	0
Communist Party of Norway	K	115	0.64%	0
Wild Votes		1	0.01%	0
Valid votes		17,881	100.00%	4
Rejected votes		289	1.59%	
Total polled		18,170	57.52%	
Registered electors		31,589		

The following candidates were elected: Nils Hjelmtveit (Ap); Nils Nersten (Bp); Lars Olsen Skjulestad (H); and Torjus Værland (V).

===== 1921 =====
Results of the 1921 parliamentary election held on 24 October 1921:

Party		Votes	%	Seats
Liberal Party	V	5,393	29.33%	2
Conservative Party (Norway)	H	5,146	27.99%	1
Norwegian Farmers' Association	L	3,679	20.01%	1
Labour Party	Ap	2,250	12.24%	0
Social Democratic Labour Party of Norway	S	1,915	10.42%	0
Wild Votes		2	0.01%	0
Valid votes		18,385	100.00%	4
Rejected votes		255	1.37%	
Total polled		18,640	58.89%	
Registered electors		31,651		

The following candidates were elected: Aasulv Eivindson Lande (V); Nils Nersten (L); Lars Olsen Skjulestad (H); and Torjus Værland (V).
