= Marianne Mikko =

Estonian politician (born 1961)

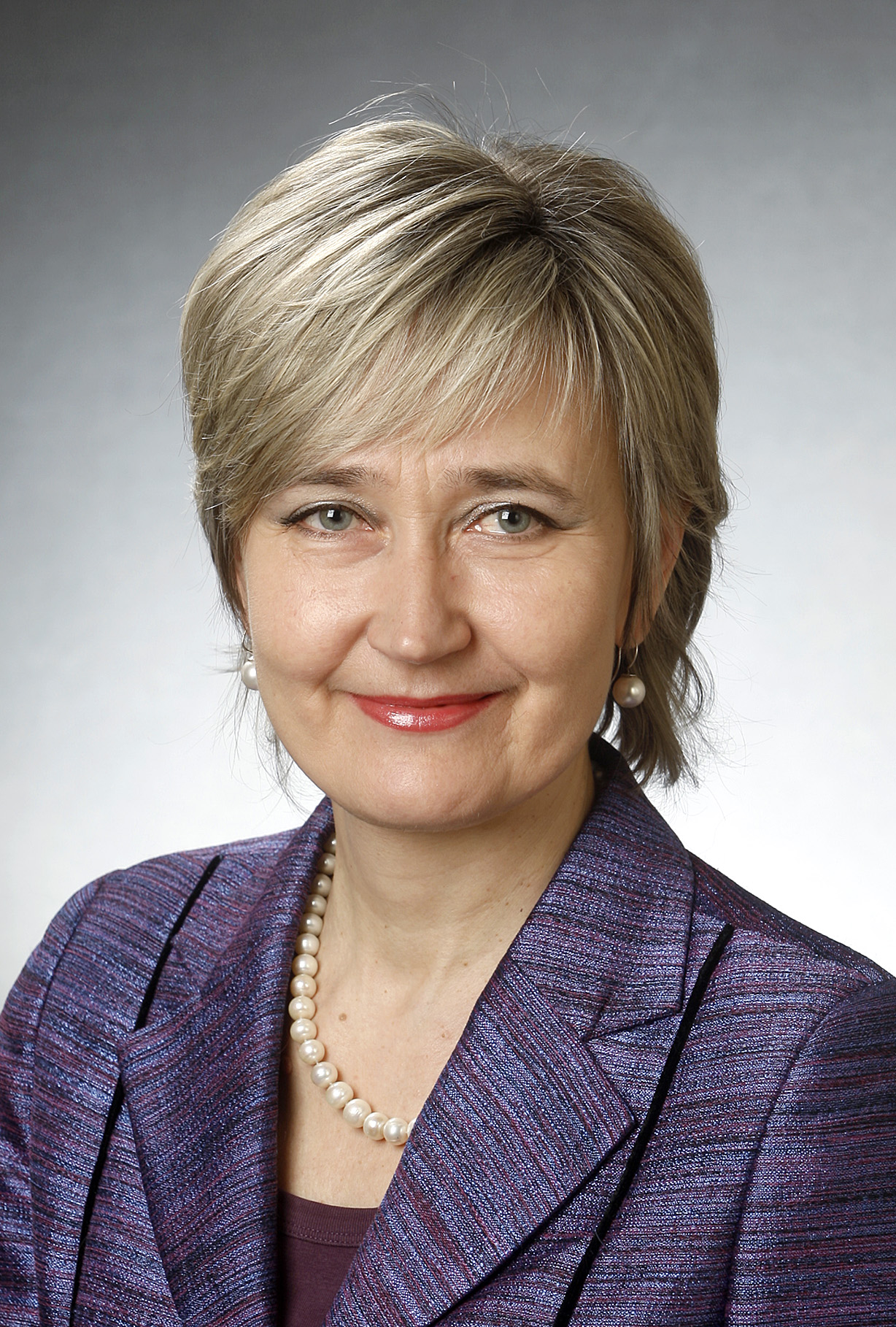
Marianne Mikko (2011)

Marianne Mikko (born 26 September 1961) is an Estonian politician and former Member of the European Parliament and former Member of the Parliament of Estonia for the Social Democratic Party, part of the Party of European Socialists. Mikko was born in Võru.

In 2022, Mikko was elected to serve on the United Nations Committee of the United Nations Convention on the Elimination of All Forms of Discrimination Against Women (CEDAW) based in Geneva, Switzerland and she currently serves as the Vice Chair of the Committee.

== Early life and career ==
Before entering politics, Mikko worked as editor of Diplomaatia, a foreign and security policy monthly magazine, from 2003 to 2004.

== Member of the European Parliament, 2004–2009 ==
Mikko was a Member of the European Parliament from 2004 until 2009. She served on the Committee on Culture and Education and on the Committee on Fisheries. In this capacity, she drafted the Parliament's 2008 own-initiative report on concentration and pluralism in the media in the European Union.

In addition to her committee assignments, Mikko headed the Parliament's delegation to Moldova.

== Member of the Estonian Parliament, 2011–2019 ==
Mikko was a member of the Parliament of Estonia (Riigikogu) since the 2011 elections until 2019. She has served on the Defense Committee and on the Committee on European Union Affairs, as the vice-chairman of the European Union Affairs Committee, and on the National Defense Committee. In addition to her committee assignments, Mikko was a member of the Estonia-Ukraine Parliamentary Friendship Group and the Estonia-India Parliamentary Friendship Group, and the chairman of the Delegation to the NATO Parliamentary Assembly.

In addition to her role in parliament, Mikko has been serving as head of the Estonian delegation to the Parliamentary Assembly of the Council of Europe since 2015. As member of the Social Democratic Party, she is part of the Socialist Group. She is currently a member of the Committee on Political Affairs and Democracy and a member of the Committee on the Honouring of Obligations and Commitments by Member States of the Council of Europe (Monitoring Committee). Alongside Ingebjørg Godskesen, she served as co-rapporteur on the post-monitoring dialogue with Turkey, concerning the 2016 Turkish coup d'état attempt. In January 2017, she was elected as one of 17 Vice-Presidents of the Assembly, under the leadership of Pedro Agramunt. She later participated in the Assembly's observer mission to the 2018 presidential election in Azerbaijan.

== Other memberships ==
- Women in International Security – Estonia (WIIS-EST), Member
