= Brit Hoel =

Norwegian politician (born 1942)

Member of the Storting for Aust-Agder
- In office 1 October 1981 – 30 September 1997
- Preceded by: Thor Lund
- Succeeded by: Liv Marit Moland

Personal details
- Born: 19 December 1942 (age 83) Arendal, Norway
- Party: Labour
- Occupation: Politician; office worker

Brit Hoel (born 19 December 1942) is a Norwegian politician for the Labour Party.

She was elected to the Norwegian Parliament from Aust-Agder in 1981, and was re-elected on three occasions. She had previously served in the position of deputy representative during the terms 1981–1985.

On the local level she was a member of the municipal council of Øyestad Municipality from 1975 to 1979.

From 2000 to 2002 she worked at the Office of the Auditor General of Norway. She has been involved in the Norwegian Association of Local and Regional Authorities and the Norwegian Heart and Lung Patient Organisation.
