= Faremo =

Faremo is a surname. Notable people with the surname include:

- Grete Faremo (born 1955), Norwegian politician, lawyer and business leader
- Osmund Faremo (1921–1999), Norwegian politician
