= Thor Lund =

Norwegian politician (1921–1999)

Member of the Storting for Aust-Agder
- In office 1 October 1969 – 30 September 1981
- Preceded by: Bjarne Henry Henriksen
- Succeeded by: Brit Hoel

Personal details
- Born: 27 May 1921 Aker, Norway
- Died: 16 June 1999 (aged 78)
- Party: Labour
- Occupation: Politician; mechanic; firefighter
- Awards: King's Medal of Merit in Gold (1993)

Thor Lund (27 May 1921 – 16 June 1999) was a Norwegian politician for the Labour Party.

He was elected to the Norwegian Parliament from Aust-Agder in 1969, and was re-elected on two occasions. He had previously served as a deputy representative during the term 1965–1969.

On the local level he was a member of the municipal council of Stokken Municipality from 1955 to 1961, serving as deputy mayor from 1959. Stokken Municipality was incorporated into Moland Municipality in 1962, and Lund remained as a municipal council member from 1962 to 1975. He later returned to serve as mayor from 1983 to 1989. From 1962 to 1963 he was also a member of Aust-Agder county council. He chaired the local party chapter from 1954 to 1971 and 1982 to 1988.

Outside politics he worked as a firefighter in Oslo and a mechanic in Eydehavn. He was a member of various official boards and councils, serving on the board of Aust-Agder Sparebank from 1983 to 1984.
