= Tore A. Liltved =

Norwegian politician (1939–2004)

Tore A. Liltved (8 May 1939 – 13 July 2004) was a Norwegian politician for the Conservative Party. He was born in Arendal. He was elected to the Norwegian Parliament from Aust-Agder in 1989, and was re-elected on one occasion. He had previously served in the position of deputy representative during the terms 1977–1981, 1981–1985 and 1985–1989. From 1981 to 1986 he filled in for Astrid Gjertsen, who was appointed to the Willoch cabinet. He was a member of the municipal council of Moland Municipality from 1971 to 1981, serving as mayor there from 1979–1981.
