= Skjærgårdsskolen =

Norwegian elementary school run by the non-profit foundation Portveien Barnearbeid

Skjærgårdsskolen was a Norwegian elementary school run by the non-profit foundation Portveien Barnearbeid. Skjærgårdsskolen applied for and received accreditation and government funds to operate as a private elementary school in 2001. At the time of application, music teacher Kjell Halltorp was headmaster of the school. When they applied, Portveien Barnearbeid expected to open the school in August 2002.

The school opened in August 2002 and had between 49 and 60 pupils until it closed.

It was later discovered that Skjærgårdskirken (a church), represented by Pastor Glenn Rasmussen, was responsible for running the school and not Portveien Barnearbeid as had been stated. The school was strongly criticized in the media for its poor working conditions and for the teaching of the gift of tongues. In 2005 the school lost its government grant due to economic and administrative disorder. The school had to return a substantial amount of the funds it had received from the government. The school did not lose its license to teach elementary school children, though.

== Start ==
When the school applied for government grants, it said that its working principles were to be that the parents were responsible for their children receiving a good and true upbringing and education, and they pointed to the word of God and Norwegian law, and that the teaching would be connected to God as the creator of all things.

== Attendance ==
In May 2004, sixty pupils were attending the school. In August 2005 forty-nine pupils attended the school, of whom eight had started that year.

== Conflict at the school ==
In May 2004 it was discovered that the school had problems with its working environment and staffing. They had to use one of the school's bus drivers as a teacher of mathematics, Norwegian and gymnastics when the regular teachers were on sick leave due to conflicts at the school. The parents reported the conditions to the government. The government discovered that several of the teachers lacked formal education beyond high school, that none of them were qualified as teachers, and that the teachers were employed by the church and not by the school. The leaders of the school refuted a lot of the criticism from the parents but admitted that the bus driver had been an assistant for the 7 to 9 year olds. They promised to rectify the problems. The school authorities ordered them to rectify a lot of the problems and warned the school that they could lose their government grant. The working conditions were also controlled by the Norwegian Labour Inspection Authority and they were instructed to have procedures for conflict resolution, for clarifying the school's religious education, for employee attendance at prayer meetings, and to show the separation between the school and the church. They also charged the school with provisions to prevent harassment of employees and to establish plans to meet legal requirements when employees were on sick leave.

== Gift of tongues ==
Some of the parents were skeptical about the school educating the children in the gift of tongues. The government school authorities asked the school to be clearer about what was parish work and what was school education. In connection with this criticism the pastor who was head of the board, Glenn Rasmussen, said that both the gift of tongues and communion would still be a part of teaching the subject of Christian life. He said this was an important part of the life and teachings of Jesus and it naturally belonged in that subject. The school also wrote to parents that the gift of tongues would continue to be taught to children as young as 7 or 8 years old.

== The school's response ==
Reverend Glenn Rasmussen of Skjærgårdskirka acknowledged a lot of the criticism as relevant and that there had been a confusion of roles between the congregation and school, but said that cooperation between the two would still be close. He was of the opinion that the allegations of harassment was a lack of respect and refuted allegations of exorcism. On September 13, 2004, the school gave its written answer to the government school authorities.

== Questions in the Norwegian Parliament ==
In November 2004, a member of the Storting (Norwegian Parliament), Torbjørn Andersen of Fremskrittspartiet (the Progress Party), used question time to ask Minister Kristin Clemet a question voicing his concern about freedom of choice in education and alternatives to state schools. The minister made it clear that this was an ongoing investigation of whether or not the school fulfilled its legal obligations.

== Loss of government grants ==
On October 28, 2004, the Directorate of Education decided to withdraw government grants from the school. The grants were stopped on January 1, 2005.

The decision was appealed to the Department of Education and Research. The department confirmed the decision on December 16, 2005.

The department said among other things that the characterization of deficiencies and disorder were obvious, that there also could have been forgery of documents and that the school's financial accounts had not been adequate. The school did not have a functioning board from its start in 2002 to March 31, 2003. The board after that was not chosen legally. The department stated that it must be clear who is economically and judicially responsible for the school and for controlling the education the children receive. The school lost its grants and had to repay parts of previous grants, but did not at the time lose its license to teach.
