= Alfred Thommesen =

Norwegian shipowner and politician

Alfred Thommesen (2 June 1914 – 31 December 1988) was a Norwegian shipowner and politician for the Conservative Party.

He was born in Flosta Municipality. He was elected to the Norwegian Parliament from Aust-Agder in 1958, and was re-elected on three occasions.

Thommesen was a member of the municipal council of Flosta Municipality between 1945 and 1947, and later served as deputy mayor in the periods 1951–1955 and 1955–1958.
