= Terje Sandkjær =

Norwegian politician (born 1944)

Terje Sandkjær (born 24 February 1944 in Landvik Municipality) is a Norwegian politician for the Centre Party.

He was elected to the Norwegian Parliament from Aust-Agder in 1993, but was not re-elected in 1997.

Sandkjær was a member of the executive committee of the municipal council for Grimstad Municipality during the terms 1991–1993 and 1999–2003.
