= Ingvar Lars Helle =

Norwegian politician

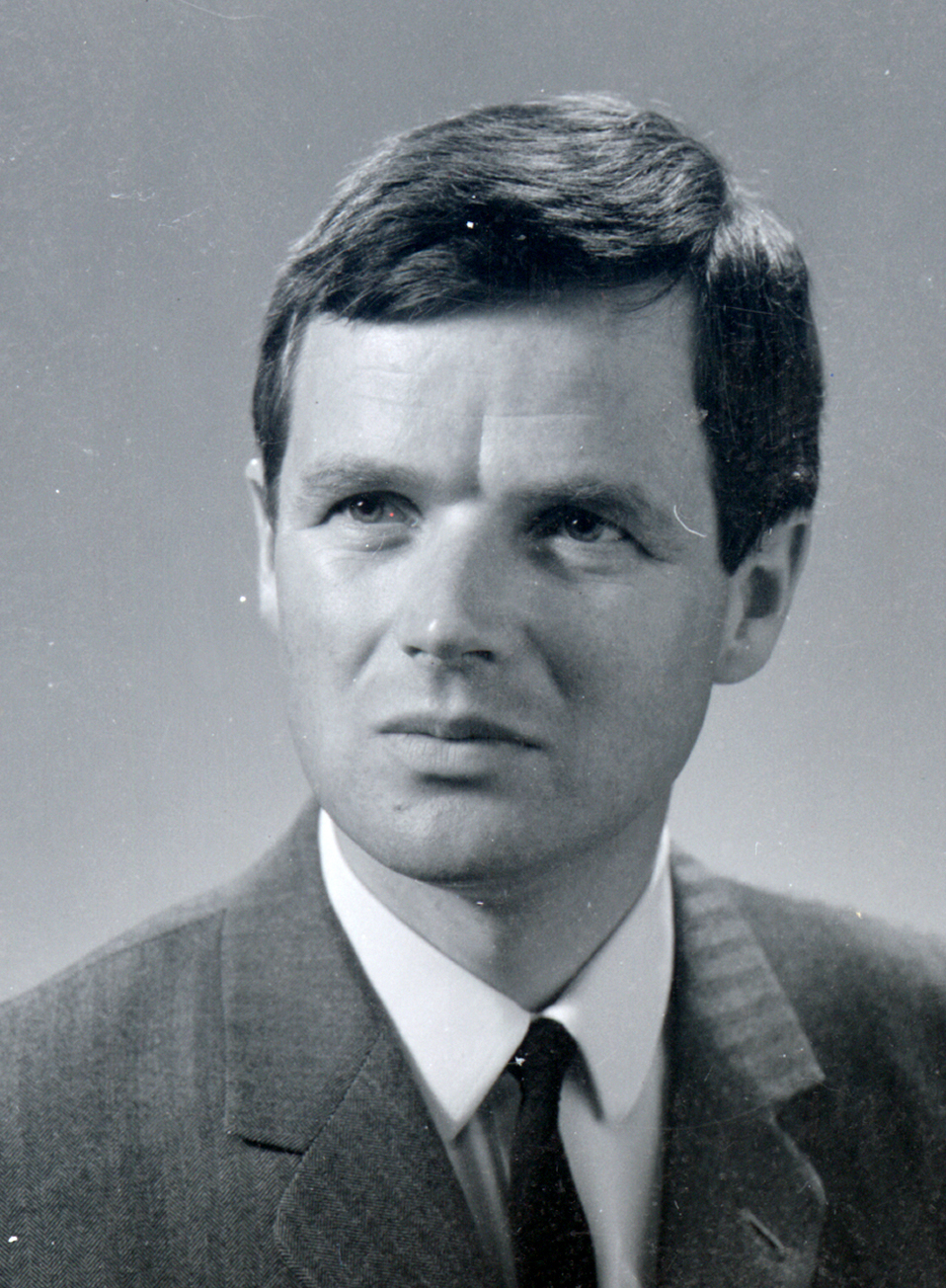
Ingvar Lars Helle

Ingvar Lars Helle (12 April 1933 – 14 May 2003) was a Norwegian politician for the Liberal Party and later the Liberal People's Party.

Helle was a member of the municipal council of Stavanger Municipality from 1965 to 1971. In the period 1967–1971, he was also a member of Rogaland county council. He chaired the party chapter in Rogaland from 1962 to 1966, and the local chapter in Stavanger from 1967 to 1969.

He was elected to the Parliament of Norway from Rogaland in 1969. During this term, in December 1972, Helle joined the Liberal People's Party which split from the Liberal Party over disagreements of Norway's proposed entry to the European Economic Community. Like most of the Liberal People's Party representatives, he was not re-elected in 1973.

However, he did serve another term in the Rogaland county council, from 1979 to 1983. From 1978 to 1980 he was the Liberal People's Party leader, and representative to the Liberal International. In 1988, when the parties reunited, Helle returned to the Liberal Party to serve as a member of the national party board and deputy leader of the party chapter in Rogaland.

Helle took his education in 1958, graduating from the Norwegian School of Economics and Business Administration as a siviløkonom. He also took pedagogy courses, and worked as a school teacher and principal. From 1981 to 1982, he worked in the oil drilling company Loffland Brothers North Sea Inc. From 1982 to 1997, he worked in Statoil, except for the years 1988 to 1991, when he worked in Norpipe. In 1992, he took the cand.jur. degree at the University of Oslo.

Born in Larvik Municipality, he was the brother of Knut Helle.

Party political offices
Preceded by Magne Lerheim	Leader of the Liberal People's Party; 1978–1980	Succeeded by Gerd Søraa
