= Freddy de Ruiter =

Norwegian politician (born 1969)

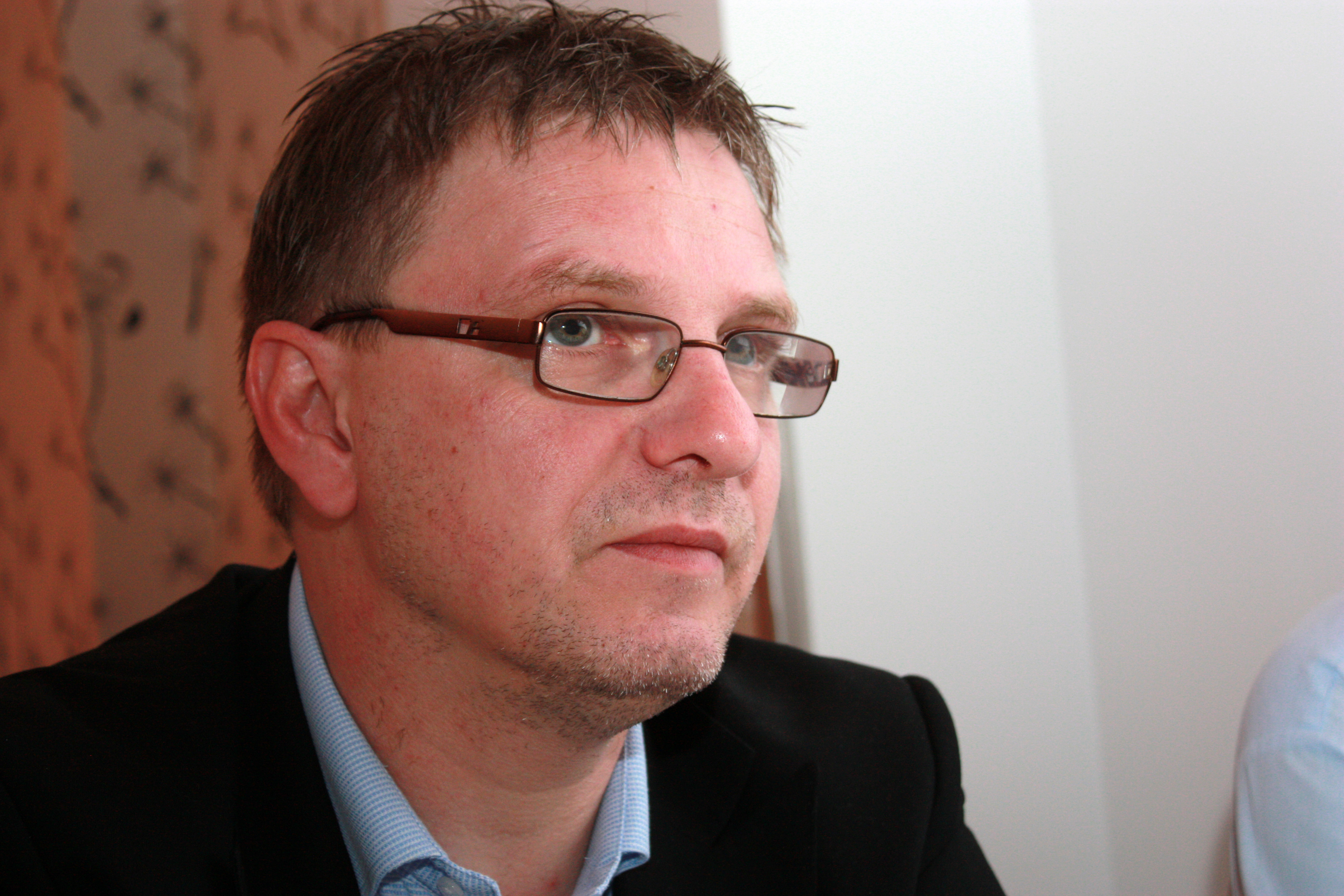
Freddy de Ruiter

Freddy de Ruiter (born 4 April 1969 in Arendal) is a Norwegian politician for the Labour and Socialist Left parties.

De Ruiter was elected to the Parliament of Norway from Aust-Agder in 2005, 2009 and 2013. He had previously served as a deputy representative during the terms 1993–1997 and 1997–2001. In 2019 he left the Labour Party and entered the Socialist Left Party.

On the local level de Ruiter was a member of the municipal council of Arendal Municipality from 1991 to 1995 and Aust-Agder county council from 1995 to 2007. He chaired the regional Workers' Youth League chapter from 1991 to 1994 and the local Labour Party chapter from 2004 to 2006.

Outside politics de Ruiter worked as a county secretary of the Workers' Youth League, then high school teacher in Blakstad and Åmli. He was educated in history, political science and pedagogics at Agder University College, the University of Bergen and the University of Oslo.
