= Liberal People's Party (Norway, 1972) =

Liberal People's Party Det Liberale Folkepartiet
- Founded: 9 December 1972
- Dissolved: 5 June 1988
- Split from: Liberal Party
- Merged into: Liberal Party
- Newspaper: Bergens Tidende
- Ideology: Social liberalism Pro-Europeanism
- Political position: Centre

The Liberal People's Party (Norwegian: Det Liberale Folkepartiet, DLF) was a social liberal political party in Norway, established by a split in the Liberal Party over the issue of Norway's accession to the European Economic Community in 1972. The party was originally called the New People's Party until changing its name in 1980.

== History ==
The new party, formed by the pro-EEC minority of the Liberal Party, originally wanted to call itself the "Popular Party - New Liberals" (Folkepartiet Nye Venstre), but was denied the use of this name, as it was deemed too similar to the Liberal Party, which in Norway is called "Venstre" (literally "Left"). Instead, the party called itself the New People's Party (Det Nye Folkepartiet). The name was in 1980 changed to the Liberal People's Party.

At the time of the split, eight of the thirteen Liberal Party MPs joined the new party. At the 1973 parliamentary election, the Liberal People's Party however won merely one seat, from Hordaland (the Liberal Party won two seats). At the next election, in 1977, the Liberal People's Party lost this seat, and was never represented in Parliament again. The party's popularity declined throughout the 1980s. In the local elections in 1987 the two parties ran on common lists in several counties and municipalities. In 1988, it was decided to officially merge back together with the Liberal Party.

In 1992, some of the old members decided to recreate DLF, reviving the Liberal People's Party name. However, the new party was later taken over by a group of free-market libertarians and former members of the Progress Party. The party was closed in 2017.

== Party leaders ==
- 1972–1973 Helge Seip
- 1973–1978 Magne Lerheim
- 1978–1980 Ingvar Lars Helle
- 1980–1982 Gerd Søraa
- 1982–1986 Øyvind Bjorvatn
- 1986–1988 Alice Ruud
- 1988 Marit Bjorvatn

== See also ==
- Liberalism
- Contributions to liberal theory
- Liberalism worldwide
- List of liberal parties
- Liberal democracy
- Liberalism in Norway
