= Tellef Inge Mørland =

Norwegian politician

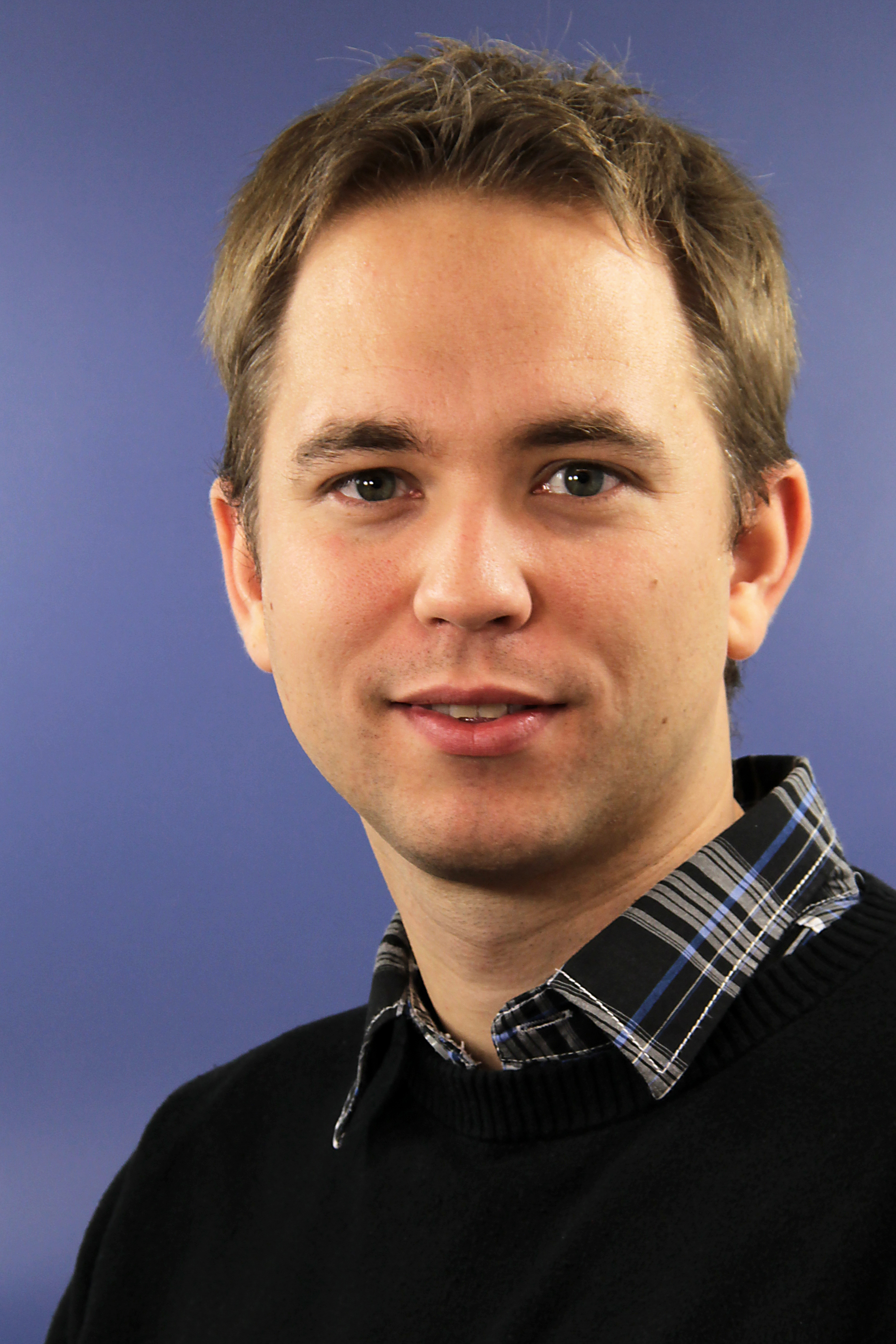
- Mørland in November 2011
- Born: 21 April 1980 (age 46)
- Occupation: Politician
- Political party: Labour Party

Tellef Inge Mørland (born 21 April 1980) is a Norwegian politician. He was elected representative to the Storting for the period 2017–2021 for the Labour Party, representing the constituency of Aust-Agder.

== Controversy ==
In September 2021 the newspaper Aftenposten reported that Mørland's benefit of free housing during his term at the Storting possibly was in violation of the conditions for such benefits.

Political offices
Preceded by Bjørgulv S. Lund	County mayor of Aust-Agder; 2015–2017	Succeeded by Gro Bråten
