= Asbjørn Andersen (politician) =

Norwegian politician (1941–1994)

- Born: 14 July 1941; Holt, Reichskommissariat Norwegen (today Norway)
- Died: 16 March 1994 (aged 52)
- Occupation: Politician
- Political party: Labour Party

Asbjørn Andersen (14 July 1941 – 16 March 1994) was a Norwegian politician for the Labour Party. He was a member of the Storting from 1985 to 1989.

== Career ==
Andersen was born in Holt Municipality (now part of Tvedestrand Municipality) on 14 July 1941, to Olaf Arnfinn Andersen and Elsa Caspara Pedersen. He was elected representative to the Storting from the constituency of Aust-Agder for the period 1985–1989 for the Labour Party. He was first deputy for the Labour Party to the Storting from Aust-Agder from 1981 to 1985, and from 1989 to 1993.

He was a member of the municipal council of Arendal Municipality from 1963 to 1967.

Andersen died on 16 March 1994.
