= Gunnar Halvorsen =

Norwegian politician

Gunnar Halvorsen (July 24, 1945 in Arendal – March 6, 2006) was a Norwegian politician for the Labour Party (AP). He was elected to the Norwegian Parliament from Aust-Agder in 1993.

He was a municipal council member in Åmli Municipality from 1967–1979, and mayor from 1979–1983. In addition he was a member of the Aust-Agder county council from 1975-1993.

== Parliamentary Committee duties ==
- 2001 - 2005 leader of the Standing Committee on Defence.
- 1997 - 2001 member of the Electoral Committee.
- 1997 - 2001 deputy member of the Enlarged Foreign Affairs Committee.
- 1997 - 2001 member of the Standing Committee on Defence.
- 1993 - 1997 member of the Standing Committee on Business and Industry.
