= Magnhild Hagelia =

Norwegian politician

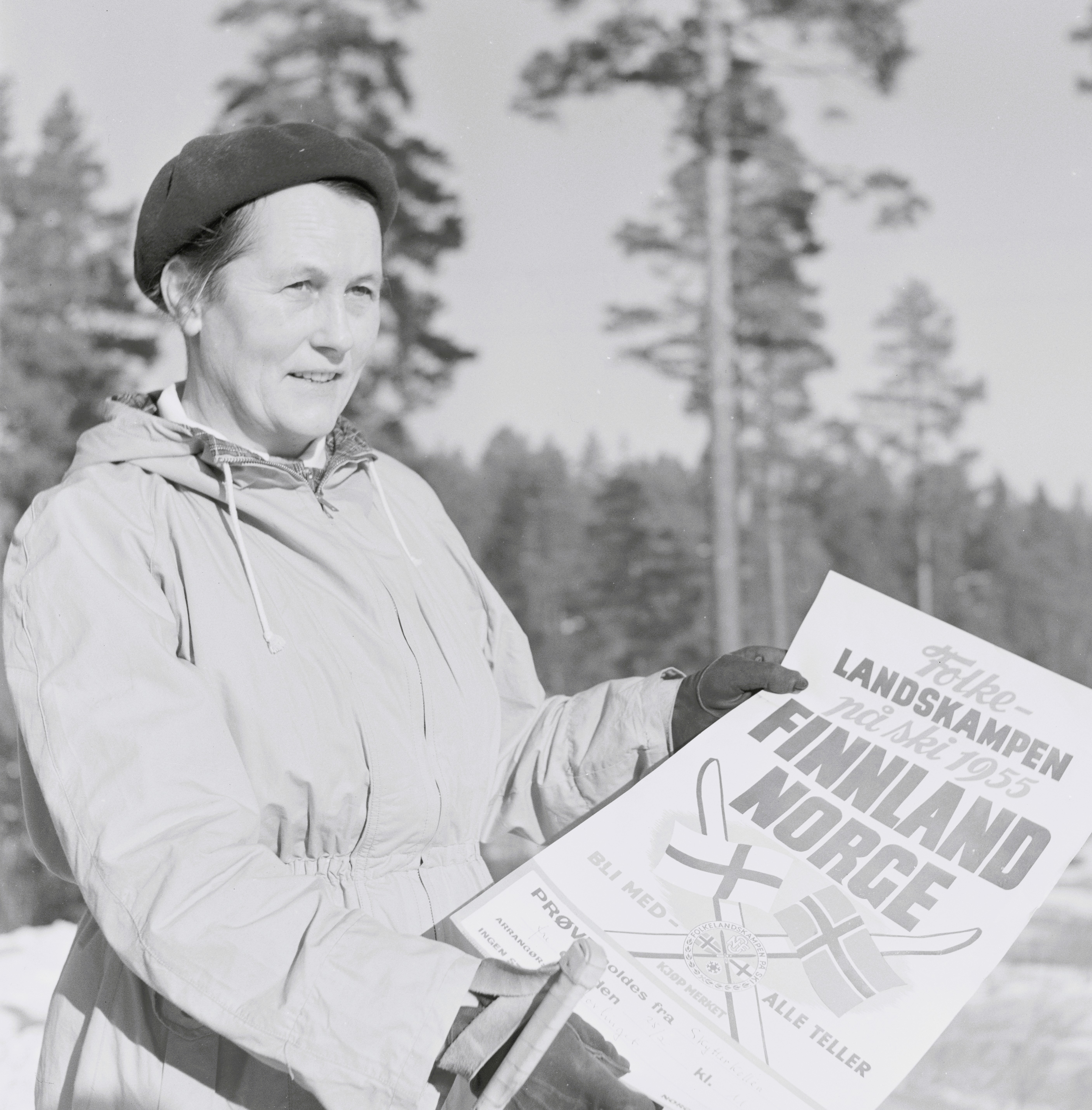
Magnhild Hagelia (1955)

Magnhild Hagelia (6 May 1904 – 4 July 1996) was a Norwegian politician for the Labour Party.

== Biography ==
Hagelia was born at Gjerstad Municipality in Aust-Agder county, Norway. She was the eldest of eight children born to Peder Jakobsen Hagelia (1874–1941) and Karen Tomine Pedersdatter Gryting (1881–1956). She was a student at Otto Treider's school in Oslo in 1933–34. She was trained in accounting and served for six years as business manager in Gjerstad supply council and then municipal councilor in Gjerstad 1945–47. She was added to the County Audit Office in Aust-Agder from 1948 until she retired in 1969.

Hagelia held positions in local politics in Fjære Municipality (1947–51), Øyestad Municipality (1956–59), and Grimstad Municipality (1971). She was elected to the Norwegian Parliament from Aust-Agder in 1950, and was re-elected on three occasions. She had previously served in the position of deputy representative during the period 1945–1949.
