= Anders Tjøstolvsen Noddeland =

Norwegian politician

Anders Tjøstolvsen Noddeland (8 January 1885 – 22 May 1960) was a Norwegian politician for the Liberal Party.

He was elected to the Norwegian Parliament from Aust-Agder in 1945, but was not re-elected in 1949.

Born in Austre Moland Municipality, Noddeland was a member of the municipal council of Austre Moland Municipality in the period 1919–1922, and then served as mayor from 1922 to 1939. He was also chairman of Aust-Agder county council, at that time a council of sitting mayors, from 1934 to 1939.

Outside politics he was a farmer from 1918 to 1954, and in addition to this, county auditor from 1926 to 1942.
