= Helga Haugen =

Norwegian politician (1932–2024)

Helga Haugen (5 June 1932 – 13 March 2024) was a Norwegian politician for the Christian Democratic Party.

== Biography ==
Haugen was elected to the Norwegian Parliament from Aust-Agder in 1985 and was re-elected on one occasion. She had previously served in the position of deputy representative during the term 1981–1985. She was involved in local politics in Fjære Municipality and Grimstad Municipality between 1963 and 1985. Haugen died on 13 March 2024, at the age of 91.
