= Birger Breivik =

Norwegian politician (1912–1996)

Birger Breivik (26 October 1912 – 28 June 1996) was a Norwegian politician for the Christian Democratic Party.

He was born in Fyresdal Municipality. He was elected to the Norwegian Parliament from Aust-Agder in 1958, but was not re-elected in 1961.
