= Johannes Vågsnes =

Norwegian politician (1923–2012)

Johannes Vågsnes (7 March 1923 – 26 February 2012) was a Norwegian politician for the Christian Democratic Party.

Vågsnes was born in Tromøy Municipality. He was elected to the Norwegian Parliament from Aust-Agder in 1973, and was re-elected on two occasions.

On the local level he was a member of the municipal council for Tromøy Municipality from 1951 to 1955, and of its executive committee from 1963 to 1971. From 1963 to 1971 he was also a member of Aust-Agder county council. He chaired the local party chapter from 1956 to 1963.

Outside politics he worked as a sexton, farmer and school teacher. He was active in YMCA and the Norwegian Farmers' Union.
