= Haagen Poppe =

Norwegian politician (born 1995)

Member of the Storting
- Incumbent
- Assumed office 1 October 2025
- Constituency: Aust-Agder

Personal details
- Born: 12 September 1995 (age 31)
- Party: Conservative Party

Haagen Poppe

Haagen Severin Nilson Poppe (born 12 September 1995) is a Norwegian politician who was elected member of the Storting in 2025. From 2021 to 2025, he was a deputy member of the Storting.
