= Åshild Bruun-Gundersen =

Norwegian politician

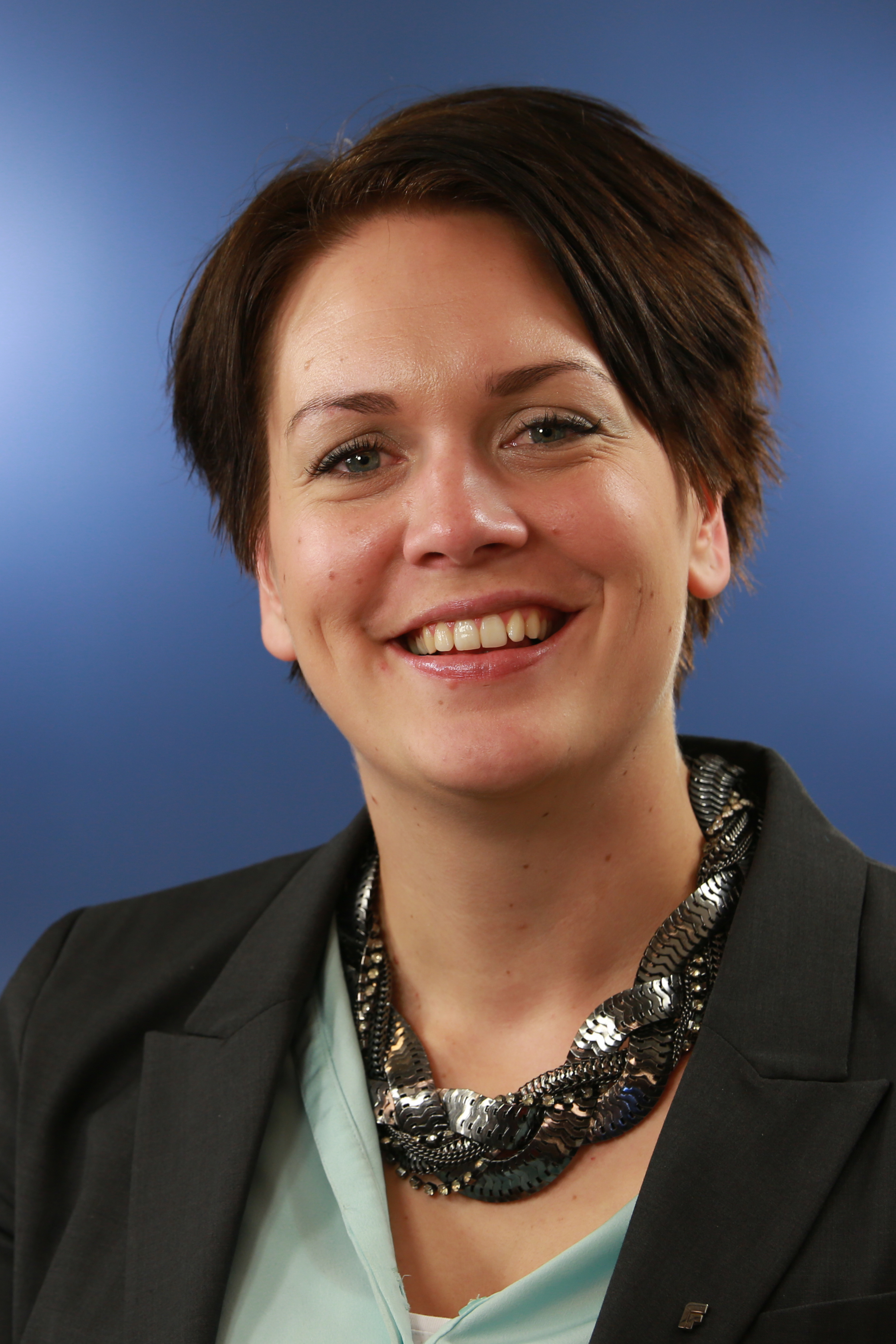
- Bruun-Gundersen in 2015
- Born: 26 November 1986 (age 39); Hisøy, Norway
- Occupation: Politician
- Political party: Progress Party

Åshild Bruun-Gundersen (born 26 November 1986), formerly Åshild Haugland, is a Norwegian politician for the Progress Party. She served as a deputy representative to the Parliament of Norway from Aust-Agder during the term 2009–2013. and was elected representative to the Storting from the constituency of Aust-Agder for the period 2017–2021. She has been a member of the municipal council of Arendal Municipality.

== Personal life ==
Bruun-Gundersen was born in Hisøy on 26 November 1986, a daughter of Folke Haugland and Else Haugland. She graduated as engineer from the University of Agder in 2010.
