= Marius Arion Nilsen =

Norwegian politician

Member of the Storting
- Incumbent
- Assumed office 1 October 2021
- Constituency: Aust-Agder

Personal details
- Born: 14 August 1984 (age 41)
- Party: Progress
- Education: University of Agder
- Occupation: Politician

Marius Arion Nilsen (born 14 August 1984) is a Norwegian politician for the Progress Party. He has been a member of the Storting since 2021.

== Career ==
Born on 14 August 1984, Nilsen hails from Grimstad Municipality. He graduated from the University of Agder in 2011.

He was elected representative to the Storting from the constituency of Aust-Agder for the period 2021–25, for the Progress Party.
