= Jørgen H. Kristiansen =

Norwegian politician (born 1976)

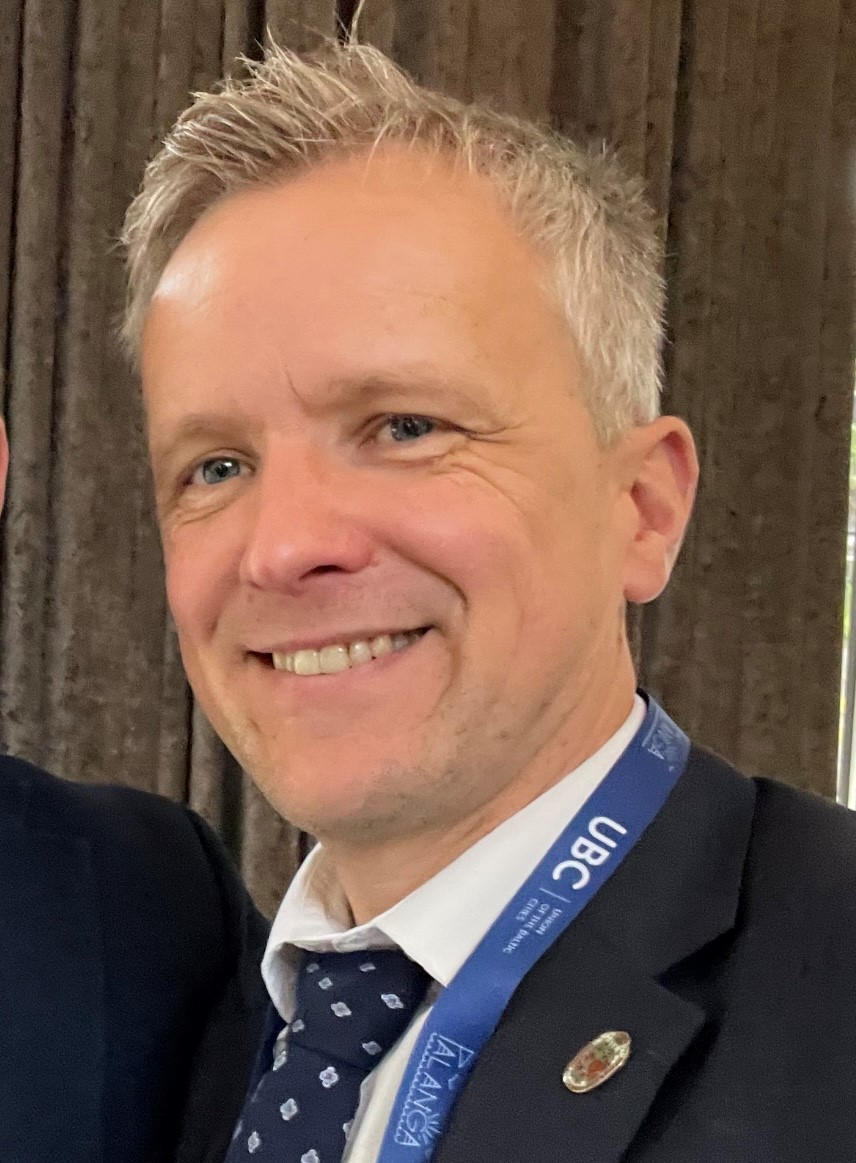

Member of the Storting
- Incumbent
- Assumed office 1 October 2025
- Constituency: Aust-Agder

Personal details
- Born: 11 March 1976 (age 50) Kristiansand, Norway
- Party: Christian Democratic Party
- Education: University of Agder; Oregon State University

Jørgen Haugland Kristiansen (born 11 March 1976) is a Norwegian author, economist and politician from the Christian Democratic Party (KrF). In the 2025 Norwegian parliamentary election, he was elected for Aust-Agder, after having been a deputy representative from autumn 2021.

Kristiansen holds a Master of Science in Economics from the University of Agder and Oregon State University in USA. He has worked as a stockbroker and corporate advisor in banking. Kristiansen has worked at SpareBank 1 Sør-Norge with risk management within real estate.

Kristiansen has been active as a politician in the Christian Democratic Party since 2001. He was a permanent member of the Kristiansand City Council from 2003 to 2021. Kristiansen was the head of the youth committee in Kristiansand Municipality from 2003 to 2007 and deputy mayor from 2011 to 2019.

== Bibliography ==
- Familien Haugland Kristiansen – ei ættesoge fra Agder, 2012, ISBN 978-82-93223-08-5
- Maritim opplevelsesbok, 2014, ISBN 978-82-93223-35-1
- Idylliske Flekkerøy (sammen med Steinar Kristiansen), 2021, ISBN 978-82-93223-46-7
