= Åse Duesund =

Norwegian politician

Åse Gunhild Duesund (née Woie; born 18 April 1944, in Grimstad) is a Norwegian politician representing Aust-Agder in the Storting. She was also a Deputy Member of PACE from 2005 to 2009.

She is the daughter of Nils A. Woie (1898–1986) and Karoline Udjus (1907–1997). She was a representative of the Christian People's Party for Aust-Agder in the Storting from 1997 to 2009.

== Parliamentary Committee duties ==
- 2001–2005 second vice-leader of the Welfare committee.
- 2000–2005 reserve member of the Extended Foreign Affairs committee.
- 1997–2005 member of the Accreditation committee.
- 1997–2001 member of the Welfare committee.
- 1997–2001 member of the Extended Foreign Affairs committee.
