= Svein Harberg =

Norwegian businessman and politician

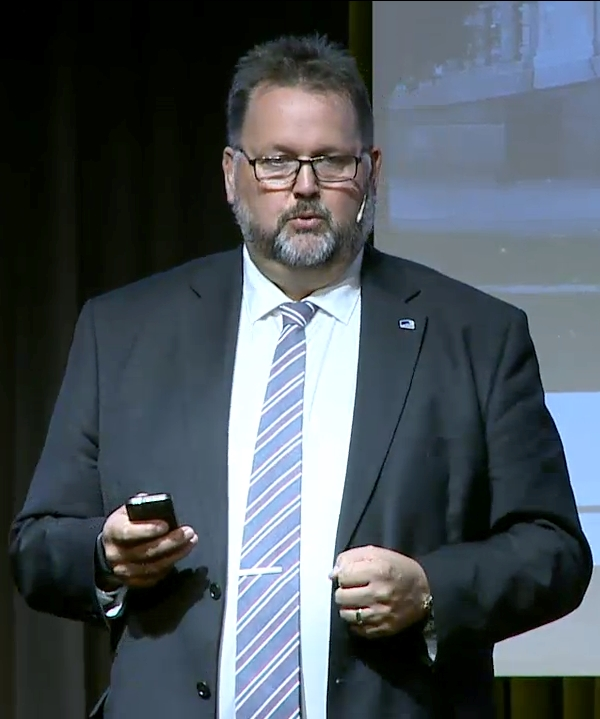

First Vice President of the Storting
- In office 9 October 2021 – 30 September 2025
- President: Eva Kristin Hansen; Masud Gharahkhani
- Preceded by: Eva Kristin Hansen
- Succeeded by: Morten Wold

Member of the Storting
- In office 1 October 2009 – 30 September 2025
- Constituency: Aust-Agder

Mayor of Grimstad Municipality
- In office October 2003 – October 2007
- Deputy: Lars Magne Tønnesøl
- Preceded by: Per Svenningsen
- Succeeded by: Hans Antonsen

Personal details
- Born: 30 July 1958 (age 67) Bergen, Hordaland, Norway
- Party: Conservative
- Children: 4
- Occupation: Businessman; Politician

Svein Harberg (born 30 July 1958) is a Norwegian businessman and politician for the Conservative Party. He served as a member of Parliament for Aust-Agder from 2009 to 2025, and the Storting's first Vice President from 2021 to 2025. He was also mayor of Grimstad Municipality from 2003 to 2007.

== Political career ==
=== Local politics ===
Harberg was elected mayor of Grimstad Municipality following the 2003 local elections. He didn't seek re-election in 2007.

=== Parliament ===
Harberg was elected to the Norwegian Parliament from Aust-Agder in 2009. During the campaign, he notably expressed it was logical to merge the two Agder counties into one. In the Storting, he was member of the Standing Committee on Education, Research and Church Affairs from 2009 to 2013. He was reelected to the Storting for the periods 2013–2017, 2017–2021 and 2021–2025, and was member of the Standing Committee on Family and Cultural Affairs from 2013 to 2017, and the Standing Committee on Scrutiny and Constitutional Affairs from 2017.

He was elected first vice president of the Storting following the 2021 election. He became acting president of the Storting following Eva Kristin Hansen's resignation following the start of a police investigation into several MPs in a parliamentary housing scandal. He also expressed that the Labour Party should be the ones to find a successor to Hansen. As first Vice President, he was succeeded by Morten Wold in October 2025.

In April 2024, he announced that he wouldn't be seeking re-election at the 2025 election.

== Personal life ==
Harberg was born in Bergen on 30 July 1958, a son of Lars Harberg and Odlaug Møkkelgjerd.

Harberg is married, and has four children with his wife.
