= Øyvind Bjorvatn =

Norwegian politician (1931–2015)

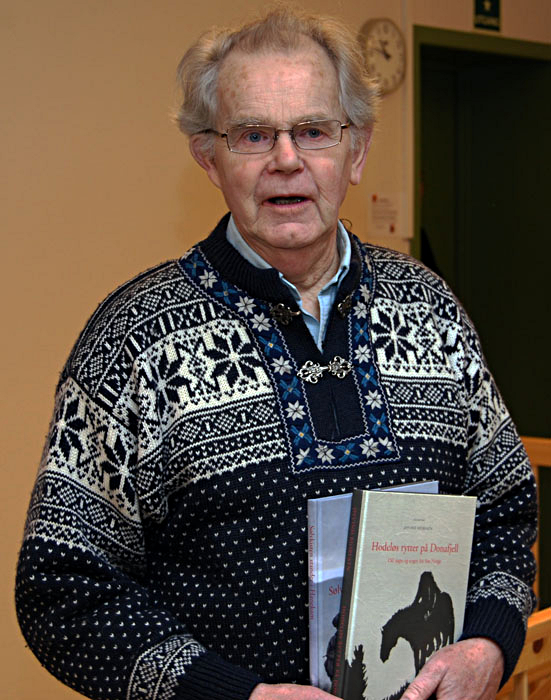
Bjorvatn in 2008

Øyvind Bjorvatn (26 April 1931 – 9 February 2015) was a Norwegian politician for the Liberal Party and later the Liberal People's Party. He was born in Herefoss.

Bjorvatn was elected to the Norwegian Parliament from Aust-Agder in 1965, and was re-elected on one occasion. During his second term, in December 1972, Bjorvatn joined the Liberal People's Party which split from the Liberal Party over disagreements of Norway's proposed entry to the European Economic Community. He later served in the position of deputy representative for the joint list of the Centre Party, the Christian Democratic Party, the Liberal Party and the Liberal People's Party during the term 1977–1981. He then became the party leader of the Liberal People's Party, and held this position from 1982 to 1986.

Bjorvatn was a member of the municipal council for Tvedestrand Municipality during the terms 1963–1967 and 1967–1971.

Outside politics Bjorvatn had the cand.mag. and cand.philol. degrees from 1960 and 1962 respectively, and worked in school teaching. He wrote numerous books on local historical topics. He died at the age of 83 on 9 February 2015 and was buried at Holt Church in Tvedestrand.

Party political offices
Preceded by Gerd Søraa	Leader of the Liberal People's Party; 1982–1986	Succeeded by Alice Ruud
