= Ingebjørg Godskesen =

Norwegian politician (born 1957)

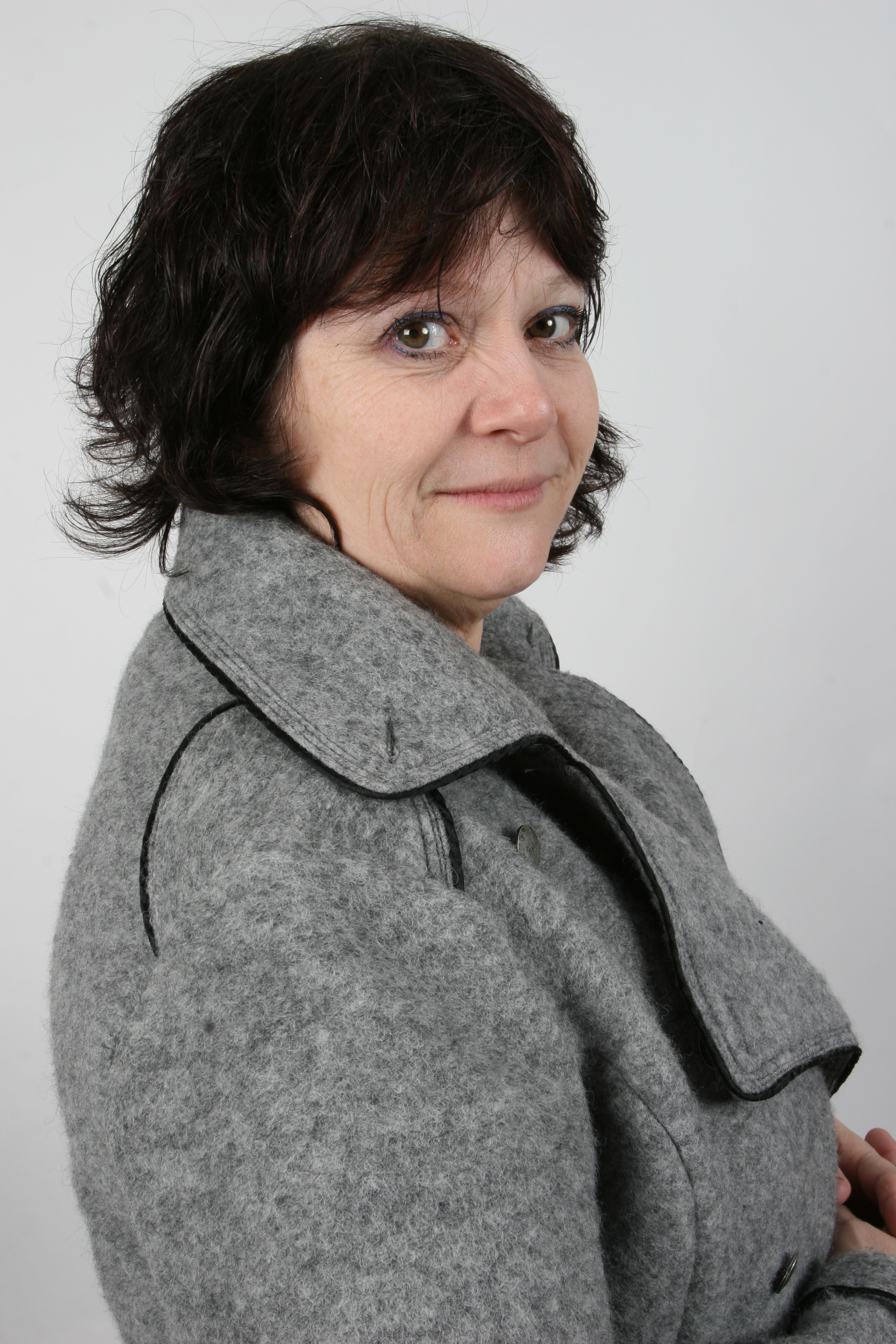
- Ingebjørg Amanda Godskesen
- Born: 26 May 1957 (age 69); Kristiansand, Norway
- Occupation: Politician
- Known for: Member of the Storting
- Political party: Progress Party until 2017, thereafter independent

Ingebjørg Amanda Godskesen (born 26 May 1957) is a Norwegian politician for the Progress Party and later the Pensioners' Party. She was a member of the Storting from 2009 to 2017.

== Biography ==
Godskesen was born in Kristiansand on 26 May 1957.

She was elected to the Norwegian Parliament from the constituency of Aust-Agder from 2009, and was re-elected in 2013.

She left the Progress Party in 2017, and was an independent representative the last part of 2017.

For the 2021 Norwegian parliamentary election, Godskesen headed the ballot for the Pensioners' Party in Aust-Agder and Vest-Agder.
