= Osmund Faremo =

Norwegian politician

Member of the Norwegian Parliament from Aust-Agder
- In office 1965–1985

Mayor of Bygland Municipality
- In office 1958–1959

Mayor of Bygland Municipality
- In office 1963–1966

Personal details
- Born: November 23, 1921 Hylestad, Norway
- Died: April 16, 1999 (aged 77)
- Party: Labour Party

Osmund Faremo (23 November 1921 – 16 April 1999) was a Norwegian politician for the Labour Party.

He was born in Hylestad Municipality and was elected to the Norwegian Parliament from Aust-Agder in 1965, and was re-elected on four occasions. He had previously served as a deputy representative during the terms 1958–1961 and 1961–1965.

On the local level he was a member of the municipal council of Bygland Municipality from 1951 to 1975, serving as deputy mayor from 1962 to 1963 and mayor from 1958 to 1959 and 1963 to 1966. From 1958 to 1960 he was also a member of Aust-Agder county council. He chaired the local party chapter from 1951 to 1964, and from 1965 to 1966 he was a member of the Labour Party national board.

During the Occupation of Norway by Nazi Germany, Faremo was a member of the resistance group Milorg. He was captured on 5 February 1943 and imprisoned in German and Austrian Nacht und Nebel camps. He escaped in 1945, helped by the White Buses. Among his awards for war efforts were the Honorary Medal of the German Democratic Republic, 1970.

Faremo was later a promoter of Norwegian-Yugoslav relations and a member of the council of the Norwegian branch of the Helsinki Committee for Human Rights from 1985 to 1988. He was active in the Norwegian branch of the European Movement, in the Norwegian Defence Association, and founded a branch of Noregs Mållag intended for members of parliament, named Løvebakken mållag. He chaired the latter group from 1978 to 1985. He chaired the friendship association Friends of Israel in the Norwegian Labour Movement (Norwegian: Venner av Israel i Norsk Arbeiderbevegelse).

Other than his military training, Faremo was educated in the Norwegian State Railways and spent large parts of his professional career there. From 1964 he worked with promoting tourism in the Setesdal region.

Osmund Faremo was married to Tora, née Aamlid. One of their daughters Grete Faremo followed in his footsteps to become a politician for the Labour Party. Grete Faremo served as a member of parliament and government minister before turning to the private sector to become a CEO.
