= Jens Marcussen =

Norwegian politician (1926–2007)

Member of the Norwegian Parliament for Rogaland
- In office 1981–1985

Member of the Norwegian Parliament for Aust-Agder
- In office 1989–1993

Personal details
- Born: 20 May 1926 Dyvåg Municipality, Norway
- Died: 29 January 2007 (aged 80)
- Party: Conservative Party (before 1976); Progress Party

Jens Marcussen (20 May 1926 – 29 January 2007) was a Norwegian politician for the Progress Party.

Before the Progress Party was founded, Marcussen was a prominent member of the Conservative Party, being a member of the national party board in 1972–1975. In 1976 he became first vice chairman for his new party.

He was born in Dyvåg Municipality and elected to the Norwegian Parliament from Rogaland in 1981, and was elected in 1989 from Aust-Agder.

Marcussen was a member of the municipal council for Dypvåg Municipality in the periods 1951–1955, 1955–1959 and 1959–1960. He then held various positions in its successor Tvedestrand Municipality, serving as deputy mayor in 1965–1966 and mayor in 1967–1971. He was also a member of Aust-Agder county council, in 1967–1971, 1975–1979 and 1979–1983.
