= Astrid Gjertsen =

Norwegian-Danish politician (1928–2020)

Astrid Gjertsen MP

Minister of Consumer Affairs and Administration
- In office 14 October 1981 – 18 April 1986
- Prime Minister: Kåre Willoch
- Preceded by: Sissel Rønbeck
- Succeeded by: Astrid Nøklebye Heiberg

Member of the Norwegian Parliament
- In office 1 October 1969 – 30 September 1989
- Constituency: Aust-Agder

Personal details
- Born: 14 September 1928 Horsens, Denmark
- Died: 17 June 2020 (aged 91) Bærum, Akershus, Norway
- Party: Conservative
- Spouse: John Herbert Gjertsen

Astrid Gjertsen (14 September 1928 – 17 June 2020) was a Norwegian-Danish politician who served as a member of the Norwegian Parliament as a member of the Conservative Party from 1969 to 1989. From 1981 to 1986, she served as the Minister of Consumer Affairs and Administration. In 2013, Gjertsen was named as the ninth most important woman in Norwegian history by Verdens Gang.

== Early life ==
Astrid Gjertsen was born on 14 September 1928, in Horsens, Denmark, to Senius Spaabæk and Helga Mogensen. She graduated from high school in Horsens in 1946.

In 1945, she worked for the Youth Red Cross where she met John Herbert Gjertsen, a Norwegian who had been a prisoner of war in a concentration camp during World War II since 1942 for his involvement in a resistance movement. On 21 September 1946, she married Gjertsen. During her marriage, she lived in Oslo, Norway, and later in Borøya, Agder, Norway.

== Career ==
=== Local politics ===
In 1967, Gjertsen was elected to the municipal council of Tvedestrand Municipality and served until 1975. From 1972 to 1975, she served as the leader of the Conservatives in Tvedestrand.

=== Parliament ===
In 1969, she was elected as a deputy representative to the Norwegian Parliament from Aust-Agder, and later as a parliamentary representative in 1973, as a member of the Conservative Party. From 1978 to 1982, she served as the 2nd Deputy Chairman of the Right.

In 1974, she served as a deputy representative to the United Nations General Assembly. In 1978, she served as a member of the parliamentary delegation to the Nordic Council.

On 14 October 1981, she became the Minister of State in the Ministry of Consumers and Administration. She was one of four women in Kåre Willoch's cabinet. During her tenure, the telephone monopoly was disbanded; she supported deregulation, and supported allowing for longer shopping hours and Sunday shopping.

On 18 April 1986, she resigned from her ministry position and was convicted for turning in NOK 32,061 worth of fraudulent taxi receipts. She was given a 45-day suspended sentence and paid the money back; the punishment was higher than usual due to her political position. Gjertsen stopped being a deputy representative in 1989.

== Later life ==
In a 2013 ranking compiled by the political editors of Verdens Gang, Gjertsen was rated the ninth most important woman in Norwegian history. On 17 June 2020, she died in Bærum Municipality, Norway.
