= Torbjørn Andersen =

Norwegian politician (born 1957)

Torbjørn Andersen (born 5 January 1957, in Grimstad) is a Norwegian politician for the Progress Party.

He was elected to the Norwegian Parliament from Aust-Agder in 1997, and has been re-elected on two occasions.

On the local level, he was a member of the municipal council of Froland Municipality from 1991 to 1999.
