= Liv Marit Moland =

Norwegian politician (1948–2008)

Liv Marit Moland (15 January 1948 – 23 October 2008) was a Norwegian trade unionist and politician for the Labour Party.

She was born on the island of Hisøy as a daughter of chief administrative officer Leif Kaare Moland and Hjørdis Lied. She attended primary and secondary school in Hisøy Municipality and Arendal Municipality, and after finishing secondary education in 1967 she attended a domestic science school. She spent her working career as a cleaner, and was organized in a trade union; she was a national board member of the Norwegian Union of General Workers from 1975 to 1991.

She was a member of the Hisøy school board from 1976 to 1980, then the municipal council of Hisøy Municipality from 1979 to 1991, serving as mayor from 1990 to 1991. She was then, as Hisøy Municipality ceased to exist, a member of the municipal council of Arendal Municipality from 1991 to 1999, serving as deputy mayor from 1994 to 1995. She was elected to the Parliament of Norway from Aust-Agder in 1997, and served one term in the Standing Committee on Family, Cultural Affairs and Administration. She then served as a deputy representative during the term 2001–2005.
