= Bjarne Henry Henriksen =

Norwegian politician (1904–1995)

Bjarne Henry Henriksen (15 August 1904 – 6 February 1995) was a Norwegian politician for the Labour Party.

He was born in Arendal.

He was elected to the Norwegian Parliament from Aust-Agder in 1954, and was re-elected on three occasions.

Henriksen also held various positions in Arendal city council from 1934 to 1937 and 1945 to 1965, serving as deputy mayor in the periods 1949–1951 and 1951–1953.
