= Gerd Søraa =

Norwegian writer and politician (1934–2018)

Gerd Søraa (8 April 1934 – 8 March 2018) was a Norwegian writer and politician for the Liberal People's Party.

She served in the position of deputy representative to the Norwegian Parliament from Sør-Trøndelag for the joint list of the Centre Party, the Christian Democratic Party, the Liberal Party and her own party during the term 1977–1981.

In 1980, she became the first female party leader of the Liberal People's Party, and held this position to 1982.

As a writer, she was the editor-in-chief for the newspapers Nidaros and Trønderbladet. She authored two novels and books about local history. Søraa died at age 83, on March 8, 2018, possibly from natural causes.

Party political offices
Preceded by Ingvar Lars Helle	Leader of the Liberal People's Party; 1980–1982	Succeeded by Øyvind Bjorvatn
