= Jan Christian Vestre =

Norwegian politician (born 1986)

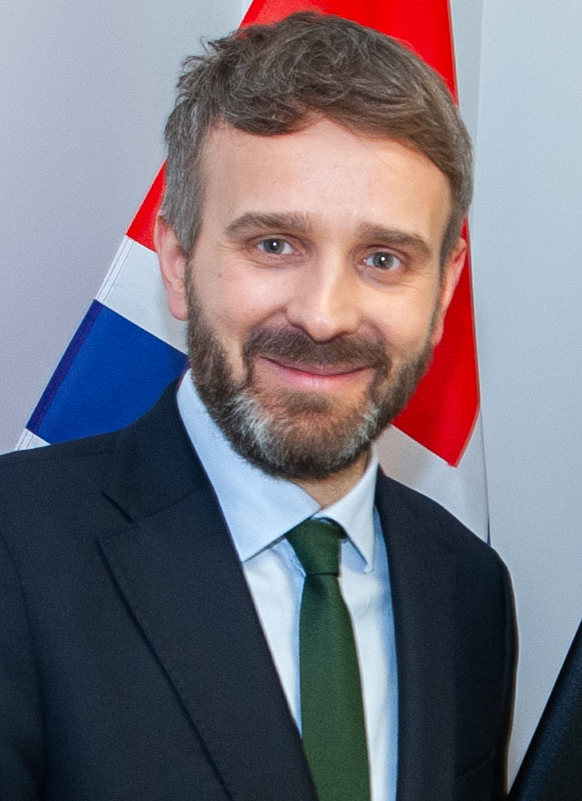
- Vestre in 2026

Minister of Health and Care Services
- Incumbent
- Assumed office 19 April 2024
- Prime Minister: Jonas Gahr Støre
- Preceded by: Ingvild Kjerkol

Second Deputy Leader of the Labour Party
- Incumbent
- Assumed office 5 May 2023
- Leader: Jonas Gahr Støre
- Preceded by: Bjørnar Skjæran

Minister of Trade and Industry
- In office 14 October 2021 – 19 April 2024
- Prime Minister: Jonas Gahr Støre
- Preceded by: Iselin Nybø
- Succeeded by: Cecilie Myrseth

Member of the Storting
- Incumbent
- Assumed office 1 October 2025
- Deputy: Farukh Qureshi (2025–2026); Malin Bye Sørensen (2026–)
- Constituency: Oslo

Personal details
- Born: 9 October 1986 (age 39) Haugesund, Rogaland, Norway
- Party: Labour
- Education: University of Oslo
- Occupation: Jurist; Businessperson; Politician

Jan Christian Vestre (born 9 October 1986) is a Norwegian jurist, businessperson in the furniture industry, and politician for the Labour Party. He has served as Minister of Health and Care Services since 2024, and Minister of Trade and Industry between 2021 and 2024. Furthermore, he has been a deputy leader of the party since 2023.

== Personal life and education ==
Vestre was born in Haugesund on 9 October 1986. He graduated in jurisprudence from the University of Oslo in 2017.

During his youth, Vestre was a member of the Workers' Youth League, and was present at the summer camp on Utøya when Anders Behring Breivik attacked it. He escaped barefoot and ran along the shore, despite bleeding, he never noticed his injuries, and held out for an hour before being rescued.

During summer of 2022, he entered a relationship with German architect Viktoria Millentrup. In April 2025, he confirmed that that they had gotten engaged over Christmas 2024 and had intentions of getting married in the summer of 2026.

== Business career ==
Vestre worked as a designer and manager in his family's furniture company, Vestre AS, and won an Entrepreneur of The Year award in 2019.

He took over the leadership of his family's furniture company at the age of 26, following the death of his father.

== Political career ==
Vestre served as a political advisor to then Minister of Trade and Industry Trond Giske, from June to October 2013.

=== Party politics ===
On 21 April 2023, ahead of the party convention, the party election committee announced that they would designate Vestre as one of two deputy leaders, alongside Tonje Brenna. He was formally elected during the party conference in May.

A month after the 2025 election, both he and prime minister Jonas Gahr Støre apologised for promises broken from the election campaign, with Vestre empathising his apology on claims about free ferries and debt removal for students. The former part was not retained from earlier and the latter scheme was drastically reduced as detailed in the government's proposed 2026 budget. Vestre later announced that the government would be willing to make changes to both of them during the budget negotiations.

=== Parliament ===
Vestre was elected to the Storting as a regular representative for Oslo at the 2025 election. While serving in government, Farukh Qureshi deputised in his place from 1 October 2025 until 11 September 2026. Malin Bye Sørensen deputised for Vestre from 11 September 2026 due to Kamzy Gunaratnam joining the government. The reason for the deputy change is because Gunaratnam has a higher position of elected members to the Storting from Oslo than Vestre.

=== Minister of Trade and Industry ===
He was appointed Minister of Trade and Industry in Støre's Cabinet on 14 October 2021.

==== 2021 ====
Vestre and Minister of Climate and the Environment Espen Barth Eide announced that the government would work actively to cut emissions, with Vestre noting: "I believe that the richest country in the world must be willing to take some greater risks. The shift we are going through now is the biggest change in recent Norwegian history. The problem here in Norway is not that we have taken too much risk. We have rather been too cowardly to point out a direction and do what works. We no longer have time for that".

Vestre expressed that it is important for Norway to be coordinated with the rest of Europe when it came to decisions about either having standard time permanently or both standard and summer time.

In December, he and fellow ministers Marte Mjøs Persen and Anniken Huitfeldt, and Crown Prince Haakon visited the United States to promote Norwegian interests notably regarding "War, the Arctic, offshore wind, contemporary art and Christmas trees". However, like Persen, he returned to Norway earlier then planned.

On 14 December, Vestre attended a press conference alongside Trygve Slagsvold Vedum, Hadia Tajik and Anette Trettebergstuen to present the government's economic COVID-19 measures. In regards to his field of responsibility, Vestre announced that the national compensation scheme for businesses would be extended. Vestre stated: "We expect owners and managers to act responsibly. The government is clear that the COVID-19 support will go to keep people in work, not for the benefit of the owners".

On 28 December, Vestre expressed that there was no guarantee that measures would be lifted come January 2022. He emphasised with the restaurant service industry, and added that the government saw no other options. He did however state that if the number of cases went down, the government would possibly instigate the process of reopening.

==== 2022 ====
After 100 days in office, Vestre stated that some things he hoped to get done going forwards, would be to possibly buy the state in and up in multiple companies, strengthen climate demands and put a break on executive salaries.

In late March, Vestre affirmed that Norway would follow the same line as the European Union when it came to adjusting the clock with summertime.

In May, he warned large companies to lower their leadership salaries, noting that they should not earn more than regular people. Vestre also expressed that harsh measures could be taken, notably to deny any further bonus salaries or exclude board members who would not follow through with the changes. He stated: "The boards must know their visiting hours. The boards are responsible for executive salaries and must listen to the expectations of a large and important owner such as the Norwegian people. If our requests are not sufficient, we may either change the regulations or put other people on the boards".

On 25 May, it was revealed that Vestre had given financial support to Extinction Rebellion of 300,000kr back in 2021 when he was chief of his family company. The report from then also revealed that the financial support would be for a three-year engagement. Vestre received criticism from opposition parties, such as the Conservatives and the Progress Party. Vestre later asserted that he no longer supports Extinction Rebellion in response to activists gluing themselves in the Storting audience gallery in protest. In a statement he said: "I am also passionate about the climate issue, but paralyzing the country's National Assembly is certainly not the right way to proceed".

Vestre AS originally argued that the engagement had been severed due to Extinction Rebellion due their actions at several Swedish airports. However, in early June, Dagbladet discovered an email from the company's strategy and sustainability manager, that it was because Vestre had been appointed minister in the new government. Vestre himself refused to comment on the revelation, with the Ministry of Trade and Fisheries noting that he had cut ties with the company.

On 28 June, Vestre announced that the Norwegian government would not repurchase equity in the ownership of SAS, notably citing that it had been irrelevant "since day one". He did however note that the Norwegian state would prefer to be a constructive creditor and limit losses as much as possible.

On 5 August, he expressed that a last resort to balance gender equality in company boards might have to be resolved with quotas for private companies. He also expressed disappointment in the equality balance, saying "we are in 2022, not 1922". He also stated that there are qualified female candidates to sit on a company board, but many of them doesn't have the chance to reach higher in ranks.

On 16 September, Vestre and the leaders of the Confederation of Norwegian Enterprise and the Norwegian Confederation of Trade Unions presented a negotiated electricity package that could assist over 20,000 companies. Despite this, the support scheme is due to expire by the end of the year (2022).

On 21 October, Vestre presented the government's first ownership message. The message included several, including changes to state owned company CEO's salaries, which included that they shouldn't get more than the average salary then the staff in kroner and pennies.

In December, Vestre announced that he would be calling for a meeting with the grocery store companies over new year to discuss the high prices on grocery items. He also added that the government is working with proposals to improve the competition and give lower grocery prices in the long run.

==== 2023 ====
In January 2023, he and agriculture minister Sandra Borch met with the grocery store companies to discuss the rising food prices. He also announced a new measure aimed towards the grocery store companies, being a margin study to "see where the margins in this value chain end up".

In June, he announced that the government would be abandoning their proposal of banning "price discrimination" in grocery stores. Vestre described that the proposal had met mixed reception after being sent on hearing, and that he would start work on new models for the same purpose over the summer.

In early August, Vestre asserted that the government would tackle the issue of adding more languages for availability for the Establishment Test in the catering industry, but also to amend the rules for the industry.

In late September, Vestre and prime minister Jonas Gahr Støre announced that the government would allocate 15 million NOK for green transition through equity, guarantees, loans and grants.

In October, E24 revealed that a close friend of Vestre had served in several Ministry of Trade and Fisheries administrative posts temporarily while he was minister. Vestre admitted that he hadn't considered his impartiality and fisheries minister Cecilie Myrseth was appointed acting minister in order to handle cases where he was not impartial. The prime minister was informed of the matter on 14 October, while also still expressing confidence in Vestre.

Vestre announced in mid-November that the government would not grant a power support scheme for businesses for 2023, citing that the energy situation had come more under control. He also suggested that businesses set a fixed price in order to help themselves.

Vestre praised the Storting for passing the motion demanding gender balance in company boards in December. Furthermore, he called the motion "historical". The rules for this were made in cooperation between the Norwegian Confederation of Trade Unions and the Confederation of Norwegian Enterprise. The motion consists of five phases, where the first must be implemented by companies by 31 December 2024 and the second by 30 June 2025. The remaining phases would have to be implemented in the remaining years until 2028.

==== 2024 ====
Vestre announced a five-point plan to ensure better transparency about shareholders in Norwegian companies in January. He described the new measures as a way to leave a positive impression for the industry and for it to carry a lesser burden.

Vestre attended the Sápmi Business Conference in Kautokeino in late February, where he presented the government's "road map" for Sami businesses. He further explained that a more detailed version with expanded measures would be presented in the coming months.

In March, he criticised Norgesgruppen for their lack of transparency about their market shares, which other grocery store companies had publicly revealed. Norgesgruppen however backtracked and published their market shares number later. His criticism was also echoed by the Conservative Party's Lene Westgaard-Halle.

=== Minister of Health and Care Services ===
Vestre was appointed minister of health and care services on 19 April 2024 following the dismissal of Ingvild Kjerkol in the wake of a plagiarism scandal.

==== 2024 ====
Vestre announced in May that the government would be open to allowing commercial actors in the health sector to assist in reducing the hospital waiting times. Additionally, 2 million NOK would be allocated by the government in the revised budget for this purpose after an agreement was reached with employee and employer organisations in the health sector. Vestre also announced that the government would be seeking to reallocate the responsibility for substance abuse treatment for children, from the child welfare services to the healthcare system.

Vestre announced in July that the government would be putting forward a new arrangement for patients, after a professional and individual assessment, can have vital medicines covered, even if the state body Beslutningsforum has said no to national approval of the medicine in question. The arrangement would also serve as "safety valve" in clinical cases.

Vestre presented the government's new abortion law in late August which would notably extend abortion from week 12 to week 18. The new law has been opposed by Labour's governing partner, the Centre Party, with the minister of children and families Kjersti Toppe encouraging Centre Party representatives to vote against the law.

In early October, he announced that the government would be accepting the application for a grant of 1.4 billion NOK to be spent on the continued construction of the new hospital in Stavanger, a project which for some time had struggled with economic limitations. The grant is intended to be spent on the first part of the project's second phase, but Vestre clarified that they would be ready to accept an application for the last part of the phase as well.

He and justice minister Emilie Mehl presented the government's proposed drug reform in late October. The reform would seek to criminalise all kinds of drug possessions and for proactive measures to be taken to avoid illegal drug uses by young people and adults, but also emphasising that people with drug problems should receive help and treatment. Furthermore, changes would be made to the laws regarding criminal proceedings, the penal code and other rules. Protests were held ahead of the presentation, while opposition parties mostly agreed in their criticism of it due to either the lack of emphasis on either drug treatments or the allowance of certain drugs.

==== 2025 ====
Following raised awareness about children's screentime by doctor and actor Anders Danielsen Lie, Vestre announced in late January that he would task the Norwegian Directorate of Health to draft concrete advise and guidelines regarding screen time, age limit and content.

He announced in March that the government would be aiming to mandate digital consultations for doctors in the event that patients can't attend an in-person appointment or unable by any other means. Vestre also called it a measure to strengthen public health in competition with private offers and emphasised the importance of the public health sector keeping up with technological development.

Vestre announced in June that the government would be aiming to make an amendment to law that allows partners of women having an abortion, to be present during the procedure. This also followed a motion request from parliament to allow this and the government has sent a proposal for hearing. Vestre added that they were hoping the amendment would secure this right to be clear for all patient groups.

Vestre announced in August that the government would be implementing a 16-year-old age restriction to energy drinks after listening to professional advise. The change would come into effect from 1 January 2026. It received a mixed reception from the health and brewery sectors, with the former arguing that the government didn't go far enough and should have implemented an 18-year-old age restriction, while the latter argued it was unnecessary.

Following revelations by Verdens Gang that at least 23 suspended doctors from abroad had been working in Norway, Vestre pledged in October that Norway would be working closely with other European countries on the matter and additionally task the Norwegian Board of Health Supervision in writing a report on how the revelations has affected patient security and how to ensure the issue doesn't happen again. Kjersti Toppe, the chair of the Standing Committee on Health and Care Services, asked Vestre to give an explanation to parliament on the matter, while also calling the revelations "scandalous" and expressed worry that it would jeopardise trust in Norwegian health authorities.

==== 2026 ====
Vestre faced criticism in January 2026 from the opposition for not making accommodations for brake rooms for nurses in plannings for new hospitals. This was also despite Vestre assuring that making more accommodations for nurses would be a priority for the government and assured that it would be their objective make more appropriate accommodations for nurses in future hospital projects.

After Verdens Gang unveiled several unreported birth injuries in the health service in 2023 and 2024, some of which had also resulted in deaths, Vestre pledged that the government would make improvements to combat the issue, while also admitting that there had been faults in the health system. Criticism was levelled against the government for not tackling the issue in the last four years despite Vestre's predecessor pledging the same. He however argued that the government had implemented several changes recommended by a commission set down to look at potentkal changes to the reporting system.

In April, Vestre called for further accommodation for healthcare workers in the healthcare sector and hospitals in particular. His comments came after opposition against the Norwegian Nurses Organisation's ruling in 1989 which in effect had reduced healthcare workers' role in the sector compared to other health workers. Though he didn't specify if the government really opposed the ruling, he pledged that more healthcare workers should be educated and receive equal opportunities in the sector, also adding that the government would put forward a healthcare workers' plan before summer, detailing how they would tackle the issue.

Vestre announced in September that the government would be implementing assisted heroin treatment in Oslo and Bergen as a permanent health service offer, also opening for it to be implemented by other health services in the country. The treatment service had been a trial project for the last five years before the decision to make it permanent.

Political offices
Preceded by Iselin Nybø	Minister of Trade and Industry; 2021–2024	Succeeded by Cecilie Myrseth
Preceded by Ingvild Kjerkol	Minister of Health and Care Services; 2024–present	Incumbent
Party political offices
Preceded by Bjørnar Skjæran	Second Deputy Leader of the Labour Party; 2023–present	Incumbent
