= Bjørnar Skjæran =

Norwegian politician (born 1966)

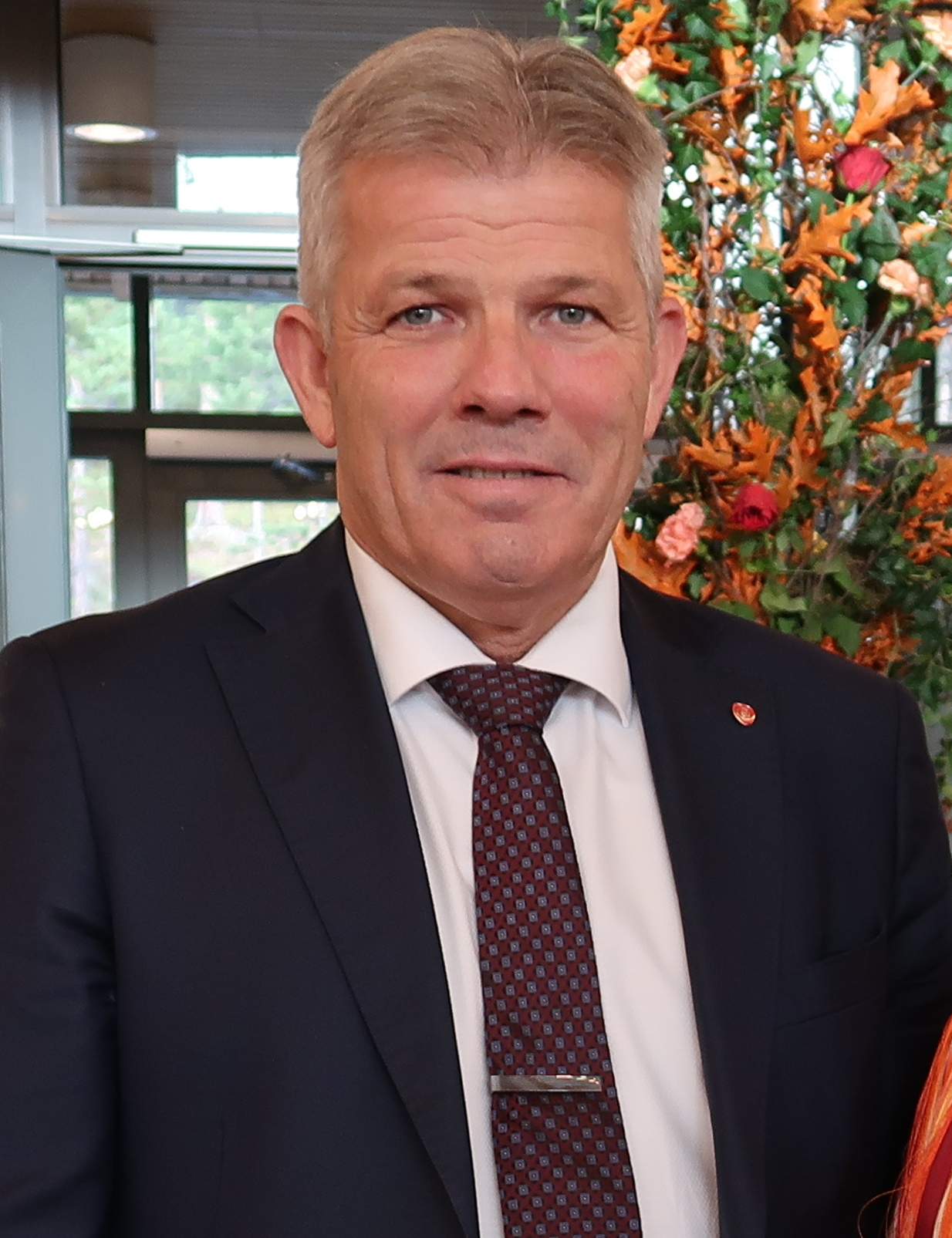
- Skjæran in 2025

Minister of Local Government
- Incumbent
- Assumed office 16 September 2025
- Prime Minister: Jonas Gahr Støre
- Preceded by: Kjersti Stenseng

Minister of Fisheries and Ocean Policy
- In office 14 October 2021 – 16 October 2023
- Prime Minister: Jonas Gahr Støre
- Preceded by: Odd Emil Ingebrigtsen
- Succeeded by: Cecilie Myrseth

Member of the Storting
- Incumbent
- Assumed office 1 October 2021
- Deputy: Karianne Bråthen; Kari Baadstrand Sandnes
- Constituency: Nordland

Second Deputy Leader of the Labour Party
- In office 6 April 2019 – 5 May 2023
- Leader: Jonas Gahr Støre
- Preceded by: Trond Giske
- Succeeded by: Jan Christian Vestre

Mayor of Lurøy Municipality
- In office 27 October 2011 – 16 October 2015
- Deputy: Aino Olaisen
- Preceded by: Carl Einar Isachsen jr.
- Succeeded by: Carl Einar Isachsen jr.

Personal details
- Born: 28 May 1966 (age 60)
- Party: Labour
- Spouse: Line Skjæran
- Children: 3

Bjørnar Selnes Skjæran (born 28 May 1966) is a Norwegian politician from the Labour Party. He has served as the minister of local government and regional development since 2025 and previously served as minister of fisheries from 2021 to 2023, and as one of the party's deputy leaders from 2019 to 2023. He was also the mayor of Lurøy Municipality from 2011 to 2015.

== Personal life ==
Skjæran is married to Line Skjæran, with whom he has three daughters.

== Political career ==
=== Local politics ===
He has a professional background as a farmer and self-employed, but has since 2011 been a full-time politician. Skjæran was elected leader of the Nordland Labour Party in 2011. After the local elections the same year, he succeeded Carl Einar Isachsen jr. as mayor of Lurøy. In 2013, Skjæran was elected a member of the central board of the Labour Party.

He was a member of the municipal council of Lurøy Municipality for 28 years, from 1987 to 2015, the last four years as mayor. He didn't seek re-election in 2015. He was succeeded by Carl Einar Isachsen jr, his predecessor, as mayor. The same year he was elected to the Nordland County Council and was group leader for the Labour Party there. Following the 2019 local elections, he was again elected to the county council, and is deputy leader of the county council group.

=== Deputy leader ===
On 19 March 2019, it was announced that Skjæran had been nominated to serve as the party's second deputy leader, alongside Hadia Tajik, who had been renominated. Skjæran was formally elected at the party congress on 6 April 2019.

In March 2021, following a dinner with the Nordland Labour Party in Bodø, Skjæran and seven others gathered in a hotel room for an after-party, breaking local COVID-19 restrictions. After revelations of the incident came to light on 15 March 2021, Skjæran issued an apology. Mayor of Bodø Ida Pinnerød commented "it's about high time that they issued an apology today", while Labour leader Jonas Gahr Støre stated that "it was a clear breach of local restrictions. Politicians have to go in front and abide and respect the rules". The Nordland Police established a case, with lead prosecutor Stig Morten Løkkebakken stating that the participants were being investigated for breech of local restrictions. Skjæran was questioned by police regarding the incident on 24 March. However, the case was dropped four days later, to much criticism by law experts, who argued the case was dropped based on the wrong premisses. Skjæran himself didn't want to question the findings. In April, the case was tried again, but was again dropped, with the Nordland District Attorney concluding that the gathering was not in violation of national or local restrictions.

Following the 2021 election, Skjæran was mentioned by commentators as a likely candidate for a cabinet post. Some of the suggested posts included minister of trade and industry, minister of transport, minister of local government or minister of petroleum and energy.

Skjæran was also elected to the Storting in the 2021 election, representing his home county of Nordland.

Skjæran had originally stated that he would seek re-election as deputy leader ahead of the 2023 party convention, but on 21 April, the election committee announced that they had designated Jan Christian Vestre as Skjæran's successor. The same day, he announced that he would withdraw his candidacy for re-election.

=== Parliament ===
Skjæran was elected to the Storting, the Norwegian parliament, at the 2021 election for Nordland. He was re-elected in 2025. While he served in government between 2021 and 2023, Karianne Bråthen deputised for him. Since returning to government in 2025, Kari Baadstrand Sandnes has deputised for him.

After leaving government, Skjæran joined the Standing Committee on Finance. In April 2024, he became the party's spokesperson on labour and social policy. Additionally he became second vice chair of the Standing Committee on Labour and Social Affairs.

He became the party's parliamentary leader on 4 February 2025, succeeding Rigmor Aasrud. After seven months in the position, he was replaced by Tonje Brenna.

=== Minister of Fisheries ===
Skjæran was appointed minister of fisheries on 14 October 2021 in Jonas Gahr Støre's Cabinet.

==== 2021 ====
Upon assuming office, Skjæran stressed that the issue of discrimination and harassment against female fishers was unacceptable, but added that not the entire industry was responsible, but everyone had to take part.

On 12 November, Skjæran announced that former transport minister Knut Arild Hareide had been nominated to become the next director of the Norwegian Maritime Authority. Of the nomination, he stated: "The Norwegian Maritime Authority shall contribute to securing Norway's position as a leading maritime nation. With Knut Arild Hareide, the Norwegian Maritime Authority will have a very well-qualified leader with broad experience from politics and business".

On 15 November, Skjæran announced that work on a law draft for Norwegian labour and salary terms to apply for Norwegian waters and soil has commenced. He did also confirm that the law would apply to (for example) cruises ships who sail from abroad and to multiple Norwegian stops. He also stated that the law would not apply to ships that dock at a Norwegian port and departs again.

On 10 December, Skjæran announced that eleven ocean related projects would get 68 million NOK in development support. He commented: "The business community plays a key role in further developing Norway's leading position in seafood and shipping. It is exciting to follow and support the great will to the change we are witnessing in the industry these days. This is how we create new and secure existing jobs for the future". He also said that the projects that receive funding represent great opportunities for green transformation, digitalisation and streamlining of the maritime industries and sustainable production of seafood.

==== 2022 ====
On 18 January 2022, Skjæran announced that the new enforcement of harvesting regulations would be postponed until 1 March. He stated: "I have a great understanding that there is a need to get acquainted with the new regulations. I therefore postpone the enforcement of rules that entail new requirements or changes in the new harvesting regulations. This regulation will not be enforced until 1 March. We are all interested in the changes that are introduced taking place in dialogue, and in a good way". The regulations are in many ways the same as the previous one, albeit with a few changes.

Norwegian purse seine boats fish for capelin off Iceland with nets, while Iceland itself and other nations they share the capelin quota with, fish for capelin with trawls. Norwegian fishermen also reported that they experience that they are limited in the areas they are allowed to fish in and the number of boats that can fish at the same time. Skjæran vowed to discuss the matter with his Icelandic counterpart, Svandís Svavarsdóttir.

On 4 March, he took over as acting minister of labour and social inclusion after Hadia Tajik resigned following controversy regarding fringe benefit and use of a government apartment. He held the post for three days until Marte Mjøs Persen was appointed to the post permanently.

Skjæran announced in March that it would be irrelevant to block out Russian ships and fishers to fish in Norwegian waters or lay to port. He stated: "This is one of the areas that will continue to be maintained, together with the fisheries research collaboration. Mutual zone access for Norwegian and Russian vessels in each other's economic zones follows from our obligations under the framework agreement on fisheries cooperation and the annual fisheries agreement with Russia". He went on to add: "There is also no authority in the fisheries regulations to prohibit landings from Russian fishing vessels on the basis of foreign policy considerations".

Skjæran faced demands from opposition party the Liberal Party, who demanded answers to why a Russian fishery millionaire was shrouded in secrecy. This was also a part of why the government was aware of the amount of quotas coming from Russian vessels in the Barents Sea. The Liberals called it unusual for it to be kept secret despite the government advising it would damage foreign policy interests. Skjæran stated: "One is that we risk not having access to information, which is important in order to be able to exercise thorough and good fisheries control. The other thing that hangs over all this is that we do not want to do anything that puts the Norwegian-Russian fisheries cooperation at stake. I have no need to characterize whether the collaboration is fragile or not. For us, it is important to fence it".

Norway and the European Union reached an understanding on 28 April about fishing in the fisheries protection zone near Svalbard and northern waters. Skjæran commented the understanding, saying: "I am glad that we now have an understanding in place. We had good talks and I want to praise the EU. This shows that they are a close and good partner, who are serious when it comes to sustainable marine management".

Originally, the government had proposed to postpone the construction of the new Ocean Space Centre in Trondheim on 12 May, however on 6 June, it was announced that this decision had been reversed. Skjæran expressed optimism about the pending negotiations about the project. He also requested that 230 million NOK be spared for the project to begin construction in 2022, while also expressing that control of the cost was important for the government.

On 7 July, he announced that the government would be making a quota notification, which would be finished in 2023. According to Skjæran, the notification would emphasise focus on "predictability for the fishing industry and ensure settlement, activity and profitability along the coast". He said: "We want a much stronger anchoring in the industry for the path choices we make. The government is asking for predictability, and that is what we want to deliver. That is why we have also facilitated such a broad and democratic process as we do now".

On 8 August, the Ministry of Trade and Fisheries announced that they would be sending out a proposed amendment to the rules and regulations, to define seaweed as seafood. Of the decision, Skjæran said: "Norway will lead the way in the development of the world's most sustainable and productive seafood industry, and here seaweed and kelp have a natural place. The government is clear in the Hurdal platform that we want to facilitate increased research into and more activity in industries linked to seaweed and new marine resources. We are now following up on that. The seafood industry is of great importance to Norway. At the same time, it is important to facilitate further value creation based on the sea. Seaweed and kelp are therefore an exciting industry with great potential".

On 19 August, Dagbladet revealed that death threats related to the killing of Freya the Walrus had been levelled against Skjæran and other high-ranking officials in the Ministry of Trade and Fisheries.

On 28 September, following the government's announcement of taking 33 billion NOK from the power producers and the aquaculture industries; Skjæran defended the tax promise. He also assured that the basic income tax would not drain local societies.

At a press conference on 6 October, together with foreign minister Anniken Huitfeldt and justice minister Emilie Enger Mehl, Skjæran stated that Norwegian fishery resources would be managed sustainably. He also stated that that way the authorities would balance the need for control and cooperation within fisheries.

On 25 October, Norway and Russia signed a fishing agreement for 2023, which would set guides for quotas of north-east Arctic cod, haddock, capelin, halibut and pollock. However, the same day, Russia threatened to withdraw from the agreement if sanctions on Norwegian ports for Russian vessels continued. Skjæran asserted sanctions weren't discussed for the agreement and that the Norwegian government didn't see any grounds for the Russians to suspend the agreement.

In December, Dagbladet revealed that both Skjæran and health minister Ingvild Kjerkol both had TikTok installed on their work phones despite cyber security experts warning against government officials utilising the app. Skjæran's ministry clarified that he had downloaded the app in relation to a link shared by a family member, but that he later deleted the app from his work phone.

==== 2023 ====
In January 2023, he expressed hope for a "zero vision" for drowning at sea related to jobs that involve the seas and oceans. Recently the government had accepted the Norwegian Maritime Authority's foundation plans for a zero vision and the authority will continue to work on a specific action plan. The move was praised by the opposition and the drowning prevention group Flyte.

Following avalanches in Troms in late March, Skjæran, along with his colleagues Emilie Enger Mehl and Sandra Borch, visited the county and inspected the damage. They also met with local officials and rescue services.

As a step of following up on the Storting's recommendation of an action plan for equality in the maritime sector, Skjæran announced steps to put such a plan into play in June. He also stated that he would take initiative for a cooperation deceleration with the employer and employee organisations, which will also be aimed at an international audience.

In September, Skjæran denounced claims from the EU Commissioner for the Environment, Oceans and Fisheries Virginijus Sinkevičius about over-fishing mackerel by gaining over 31,99% of the designated mackerel quota. Skjæran countered that the Norwegian quota was grounded in the Norwegian economic zone and claimed that the quota the EU was demanding was too high and called for more realistic demands when the parts would be negotiating next.

On 16 October, Skjæran was succeeded by Cecilie Myrseth in a cabinet reshuffle.

=== Minister of Local Government ===
Skjæran returned to government following the 2025 parliamentary election and was appointed minister of local government in a minor cabinet reshuffle, succeeding Kjersti Stenseng.

==== 2025 ====
A month into his tenure, Skjæran was confronted with the 2026 budget that contradicted his earlier defence of the government's student debt removal scheme, which would only now be implemented in 88 municipalities rather than the original 101 proposed beforehand. The budget also detailed that the debt would be paid off over a three-year period rather than until all the debt had been paid off. Skjæran argued that the government is currently reviewing the scheme before potentially retaining it and it now only affects more decentralised municipalities. After it was revealed that his party had misled voters with the budget and during the election campaign, Skjæran issued an apology as the government decided to retain both schemes after all.

In December, Skjæran argued that the Register for Governmental Approval of Financial Obligations needed improvements in order to better protect small municipalities with struggling economies. He proposed that there should be "a red button" for these municipalities and that evaluations should be made if whether or not the county governors have the necessary equipment to assist them. He also argued further municipal mergers could be a part of the solution, but emphasised that this should be done volunteerily by municipalities if they wish for it.

==== 2026 ====
In January 2026, he received the report from the commission on municipalities, which he later sent to parliament for hearing. The report notably highlighted municipal mergers as part of the long-term solutions for struggling municipalities. While Skjæran expressed that he agreed with the conclusion in principle, he emphasised that the government wouldn't seek to force municipalities to merge and instead leave that fate up to themselves and that they would support those municipalities who'd consider it as an option. He also rejected that the government was seeking another municipal reform.

Contrary to previous statements, Skjæran expressed in May that the government would possibly opt for merging poorer municipalities by force in order to stabilise their economic situations. He furthermore clarified that the government hadn't concluded on the matter yet, but cited inspiration from the Finnish government on the matter, in addition to impose intergovernmental cooperation between municipalities. Overall he expressed that the government's objective was to tackle the issue of an ageing population and reduce "state detail management".

Skjæran's ministry approved the construction of a new industrial area outside of Fredrikstad in October despite the County Governor halting the approval for the construction, supposedly because Fredrikstad Municipality hadn't properly considered alternative construction sites. Legal and planning experts criticised the decision, arguing Skjæran's decision would set a precedence of politicians intervening to approve construction plans without properly considering the consequences of it. Skjæran argued that the municipality's original plan was sufficient, also arguing that the intended construction area "was needed for industrial development" already anchored in the municipal and county charter.

Political offices
Preceded by Kjersti Stenseng	Minister of Local Government; 2025–present	Incumbent
Preceded by Tuva Moflag	Second Vice Chair of the Standing Committee on Labour and Social Affairs; 2024–2025	Succeeded by Per Vidar Kjølmoen
Preceded by Odd Emil Ingebrigtsen	Minister of Fisheries and Ocean Policy; 2021–2023	Succeeded by Cecilie Myrseth
Preceded by Hadia Tajik	Minister of Labour and Social Inclusion; Acting; 2022	Succeeded by Marte Mjøs Persen
Preceded by Carl Einar Isachsen jr.	Mayor of Lurøy Municipality; 2011–2015	Succeeded by Carl Einar Isachsen jr.
Party political offices
Preceded by Trond Giske	Second Deputy Leader of the Labour Party; 2019–2023	Succeeded by Jan Christian Vestre
Preceded by Rigmor Aasrud	Parliamentary Leader of the Labour Party; 2025	Succeeded by Tonje Brenna
