= Kjersti Stenseng =

Norwegian politician

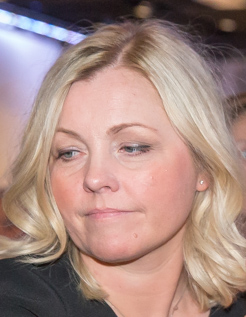
- Stenseng at the Labour Party conference in 2017.

Minister of Labour and Social Inclusion
- Incumbent
- Assumed office 16 September 2025
- Prime Minister: Jonas Gahr Støre
- Preceded by: Tonje Brenna

Minister of Local Government
- In office 4 February 2025 – 16 September 2025
- Prime Minister: Jonas Gahr Støre
- Preceded by: Erling Sande
- Succeeded by: Bjørnar Skjæran

Party Secretary of the Labour Party
- In office 18 April 2015 – 4 February 2025
- Leader: Jonas Gahr Støre
- Preceded by: Raymond Johansen
- Succeeded by: Kari-Anne Opsal

Deputy Member of the Storting
- In office 1 October 2013 – 30 September 2017
- Deputising for: Rigmor Aasrud (2013)
- Preceded by: Stine Renate Håheim
- Constituency: Oppland

Personal details
- Born: 4 September 1974 (age 52) Nord-Fron Municipality, Oppland, Norway
- Party: Labour
- Spouse: Tom Tvedt (m. 2024)
- Children: 2
- Education: Nord-Trøndelag University College; Lillehammer University College; University of Oslo

Kjersti Stenseng (born 4 September 1974) is a Norwegian politician for the Labour Party currently serving as Minister of Labour and Social Inclusion since September 2025. She previously served as the Minister of Local Government and Regional Development from February to September 2025 and was the party secretary from 2015 to 2025.

== Career ==
=== Education ===
She finished her secondary education at Vinstra Upper Secondary School in 1993. She minored in sociology and modern history at the Nord-Trøndelag University College and Lillehammer University College before studying political science and history at the University of Oslo.

She also took teacher's education and worked as a teacher in Kvam and Vinstra from 1997 to 1999. From 1999 to 2010 she worked in the Peer Gynt Festival, the last nine years as director, and from 2010 to 2011 she was the director of the Norwegian Festival of Literature.

=== Local politics ===
She was elected to the municipal council of Sør-Fron Municipality from 2007 to 2011. She became leader in Oppland Labour Party in 2010 and also national board member, and was promoted to central board member in 2011.

=== Government ===
She was an acting political adviser in the Ministry of Culture from January to August 2010, then acting political adviser again from June to October 2011. From November to December 2011 she was an acting State Secretary in the same ministry. From 1 January 2012 she was an acting political adviser again, then political adviser from March and State Secretary from May 2012 to 1 October 2013. She also served as a deputy member of the Storting from Oppland between 2013 and 2017.

=== Parliament ===
She was elected as a deputy representative to the Storting, Norway's parliament, from Oppland in 2013. As Rigmor Aasrud from Oppland was a member of the outgoing Stoltenberg's Second Cabinet, Stenseng met as a regular representative during the two weeks before the cabinet change.

=== Party politics ===
At the 2015 party conference, she was elected party secretary. She has been re-elected at every convention since (2017, 2019, 2021 and 2023).

Mere weeks before the 2023 party convention, former deputy leader and mayor of Tana Helga Pedersen was open to succeeding Stenseng as party secretary as part of a greater renewal of the party's leadership. This was despite the fact that Stenseng had previously announced that she would seek re-election. On 30 April, Pedersen announced that she wouldn't stand as a candidate to succeed Stenseng, arguing that she didn't have sufficient support within the party. This marked the first time that Stenseng's position had been challenged.

In mid-December 2024, she announced that she would not seek re-election as party secretary at the next party convention in April 2025. Upon being appointed to government in February 2025, Mari Aaby West succeeded Stenseng as acting secretary. West was in turn succeeded by Kari-Anne Opsal on a permanent basis following the party convention in April.

=== Minister of Local Government ===
Following the Centre Party's withdrawal from government, she was appointed minister of local government on 4 February 2025.

==== Tenure ====
A month into her tenure, Stenseng announced that the government would be making an action plan to preserve kvens language and culture based on the findings of the Truth and Reconciliation Commission. Preliminarily she noted that it was uncertain when the plan would be finalised, but that the government was swiftly having discussions with kvens organisations about the matter. The plan received support from kvens organisations and the Sámi Parliament of Norway.

Stenseng intervened in April to approve the extension of a new sewage treatment plant to be constructed in Kongsberg after the county governor had rejected the local authorities' go-ahead of the extension. Stenseng argued that it was important to get the extension in place in order to secure infrastructure in the uncertain times of global affairs.

In June, she announced that the government would be supporting Gran Municipality's objective to become a part of Akershus county instead of Innlandet. Historically, Gran Municipality, together with the municipalities of Lunner and Jevnaker made up the Hadeland region, but were divided after Oppland and Hedmark merged to become Innlandet county, with Gran being the only one of the three to join the new county. Stenseng emphasised that Gran could still have managed in Innlandet, but that the government respected their wishes to be part of one region in the same county as a priority for their decision. The changes are scheduled to be voted on by the Storting in the spring of 2026.

Stenseng announced in August that the government would seek to change parts of the building regulations, arguing that they had become "too rigid" and was "working against their purpose". Furthermore, she said it would also be relevant for them to lift some regulations on noice and light input.

In mid-September, she issued a letter to municipalities around the country with a list of demands with the aim of increasing housing regulations. She argued that it wasn't meant as criticism of local authorities, but rather an invitation for a joint effort. Furthermore, she argued that the government prioritised working with municipalities on the matter, with them well knowing what the government's expectations would be.

=== Minister of Labour and Social Inclusion ===
She was appointed minister of labour and social inclusion in a minor cabinet reshuffle following the 2025 parliamentary election.

==== 2025 ====
Among her first actions as minister, Stenseng proposed an amendment to the national insurance act which would make it easier for trade unions to keep workers who are temporarily absent from work and met with oil pioneers' trade unions to present a new compensation scheme for those affected by chemical injuries. She also proposed to amend the Norwegian integration program with an integration declaration which would demand immigrants between the ages of 18 and 55 to adhere to Norwegian principles, values, rights and freedoms in addition to learning Norwegian before getting employed. This move was supported by the main opposition party, the Progress Party.

Stenseng fired Hans Christian Holte, the director of the Norwegian Labour and Welfare Administration, on 11 November after the Office of the Auditor General of Norway had concluded that the Norwegian Labour and Welfare Administration had misinformed the Ministry of Labour and Social Inclusion and the Auditor General about a backlog of logs regarding IT systems dating back to March 2025. These had not been logged as originally reported, a discrepancy only reported in September the same year. This was also in violation of internal regulations about internal checks.

==== 2026 ====
In January 2026, Stenseng announced that the government would be tightening in on benefits for immigrants, arguing that it "should pay off to get a job" and that both cultural differences and weak economic incentives have been in the way. Furthermore, she argued that equality should be more clearly defined in introduction programs to immigrants and that expectations should be made more clearer.

Stenseng announced in late March that the government would be making changes to the rules concerning part-time workers, which would include that they have the right for pay for overtime work, preferential right to permanent employment and a general right for workers to ask to work in reduced capacity. These changes came after several verdicts made by both Norwegian courts and the European Court of Justice regarding the right to overtime pay for part-time work, which had led the parties in the labour market on a collision course.

The government signed an agreement of intention that would ensure responsible implementation and use of AI in the workforce, just two days after similar laws were implemented in the US state of California. Of the agreement, Stenseng emphasised that the outline of the law would remain the same. She also added that the law would stipulate surveillance of employees as illegal unless there was reasonable cause for it, by employers. Although not confirming if they would adapt similar laws as California, she did assert the governemnt would follow developments closely, including in the European Union.

== Personal life ==
She has two daughters from a previous relationship. She is married to former president of the Norwegian Confederation of Sports Tom Tvedt.
