= Tonje Brenna =

Norwegian politician

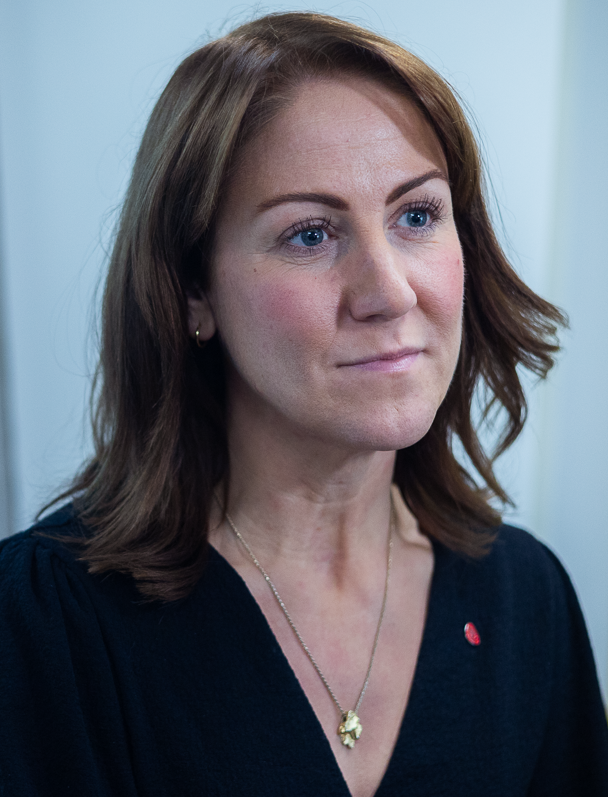
- Brenna in 2023

Minister of Labour and Social Inclusion
- In office 16 October 2023 – 16 September 2025
- Prime Minister: Jonas Gahr Støre
- Preceded by: Marte Mjøs Persen
- Succeeded by: Kjersti Stenseng

First Deputy Leader of the Labour Party
- Incumbent
- Assumed office 5 May 2023
- Leader: Jonas Gahr Støre
- Preceded by: Hadia Tajik

Minister of Education
- In office 14 October 2021 – 16 October 2023
- Prime Minister: Jonas Gahr Støre
- Preceded by: Guri Melby
- Succeeded by: Kari Nessa Nordtun

Chairwoman of the County Cabinet of Viken
- In office 1 January 2020 – 14 October 2021
- County Mayor: Roger Ryberg
- Preceded by: Office established
- Succeeded by: Siv Henriette Jacobsen

Member of the Storting
- Incumbent
- Assumed office 1 October 2025
- Constituency: Akershus

Personal details
- Born: 21 October 1987 (age 38) Oslo, Norway
- Party: Labour
- Spouse: Vetle Larsen (m. 2022; sep. 2023)
- Domestic partner: Martin Henriksen (formerly)
- Children: 2
- Occupation: Politician

Tonje Brenna (born 21 October 1987) is a Norwegian politician currently serving as the parliamentary leader of the Labour Party since 2025. A member of the Labour Party, she previously served in Jonas Gahr Støre's government between 2021 and 2025 and has been the party's deputy leader since 2023. She previously served as the chairwoman of the Viken county cabinet from 2020 to 2021 and a deputy member in the Storting for Akershus from 2017 to 2025. She has been a regular representative since 2025 for the same constituency.

== Personal life ==
Brenna was born on 21 October 1987.

She was formerly in a relationship with fellow party member Martin Henriksen.

She married Vetle Larsen in the summer of 2022, with whom she has one son. They also have a Labrador Retriever named Jussi. Brenna also has a child from a previous relationship. In July 2023, Se og Hør revealed that Brenna and Larsen had separated.

In December 2024, Brenna revealed that she was in a relationship with Swedish carpenter Simon Jensen, whom she had met while visiting Stockholm.

== Political career ==
=== Youth league ===
Brenna was the General Secretary of the Workers' Youth League from 2010 to 2012. In her position, she was present during the time of the 2011 Norway attacks on the island of Utøya, and responsible for the camp there. She was also responsible for taking care of loved ones, victims and survivors during the aftermath of the attack.

=== Local politics ===
Brenna was a member of the Akershus county council from 2007 to 2019, and from 2020 a member of the county council of Viken. She chaired the county cabinet of Viken from 2020 to 2021.

=== Party politics ===
In the wake of Hadia Tajik's resignation in March 2022, Brenna was floated as a possible successor, and was so again in December the same year. In February 2023, both Troms and Akershus county chapters chose her as their preferred candidate for the national party's deputy leader. Brenna thanked for the confidence and said that she was willing to take on the role if that's the party wish for at the party conference in May. She officially announced her candidacy on 1 March. On 21 April, the party election committee announced that they would designate her as one of two deputy leaders, alongside Jan Christian Vestre. She was formally elected during the party conference in May.

In her capacity as deputy leader, Brenna was also charged with crafting the Labour Party's policy program ahead of the 2025 election, which she public presented a draft of at the end of September 2024.

=== Parliament ===
She was a political advisor at the Office of the Prime Minister from 2012 to 2013. During this time, the 22 July commission was handed over. She was also a political advisor to minister of justice Grete Faremo from May to October 2013. She was elected deputy representative to the Storting from the constituency of Akershus for the periods 2017–2021 and 2021–2025, for the Labour Party.

In 2020 she was one of the signatories of the "Call for Inclusive Feminism," a document which led to the establishment of the Initiative for Inclusive Feminism.

In 2021 she published a book related to the 2011 Utøya shootings, 22. juli – og alle dagene etterpå.

She was elected as a regular representative to the Storting from Akershus at the 2025 election. She also succeeded Bjørnar Skjæran as the Labour Party's parliamentary leader and joined the Standing Committee on Foreign Affairs and Defence.

=== Minister of Education ===
On 14 October 2021, she was appointed minister of education in Støre's Cabinet.

==== 2021 ====
Brenna expressed that the Solberg Cabinet's early re-instalment of school absence rules were wrong. She promised to be back with a better solution as soon as possible, saying that rules had to be understandable for both teachers and students and to be experienced as sensible.

Following demands for the absence limit in upper secondary schools to be relaxed, Brenna announced that this change would become effective on 5 November and last throughout the school term. The primary cause for the demand had been that students should not be given absence remarks due to having COVID-19 and have the need to go into quarantine. She said she understood the dilemma for students, and noted that they would have to get an approved leave of absence, to for example go to a doctor's appointment or similar.

On 17 November, Brenna ordered the Norwegian Directorate for Education and Training to halt the case process of private schools. Brenna said that the government wanted to strengthen public schools and wanted to stop the previous government's privatisation of schools. The Conservative Party's Margret Hagerup called it "a dark day" for Norwegian students, and that the government had focused on "ideology and structure" instead of "quality and diversity".

In early December, Brenna expressed that private schools earned to much from students taking private exams. She stressed that upper secondary schools should advise students better and to inform them of their choices when it comes to higher education. She did however add that private education isn't necessarily bad, and serves as "a safety valve" for those who don't have other options.

On 13 December, at a government press conference with prime minister Jonas Gahr Støre and health minister Ingvild Kjerkol, it was announced that kindergartens, primary and lower secondary schools would be adjusted to yellow tier, while upper secondary schools to red. Brenna announced that municipalities should prioritise vaccinating kindergarten and school staff once the vaccination of a third vaccine dose commences.

Tonje Brenna giving a speech for Noregs Mållag

Following criticism of the government's measure to give exceptions to teachers and kindergarten staff in regards to quarantine, Brenna defended the decision, citing it to be crucial for children's ability to learn. She stated: "I understand the criticism, but I am keen to take the necessary steps to keep kindergartens and schools as open as possible. It is crucial for children and young people's learning and everyday life, but also for parents, society and working life".

==== 2022 ====
On 11 February 2022, Brenna announced that exams for the 2021–22 school year would be cancelled, citing the pandemic. She did however stress that it wasn't an indication for students to take it easy, and encouraged them to work hard going forward.

On 2 April, she announced that changes would be made to the test system in Norwegian schools. Brenna clarified that tests still would be utilised, but needs to be viewed with "fresh eyes", in addition to there being less tests. She stated: "Information about how students are doing is only useful if it is used in a good way. We have not sat down and looked holistically at how the tests work, and how we use them in development work, for many years".

At a press conference on 29 April, the government announced that temporary changes to laws in order to include Ukrainian refugees. In regards to her field of responsibility, Brenna talked about education offers and learning to/for Ukrainian children. This included a government proposal about learning and training which would expand the period from one to three months that was originally in the law. She stated: "This will make it possible for the municipalities to receive several refugees at once. The municipalities still have a duty to provide an offer as soon as possible. With this proposal, the municipalities will have more time to be able to acquire premises and employees and put in place a full-fledged training offer".

On 6 June, Brenna and culture minister Anette Trettebergstuen announced a plan to have more men work within the health sector, in collaboration with the University of Tromsø, to launch a pilot project. The aim for the pilot project is to encourage boys to apply for an education within the health service. Brenna stated: "The best mechanic can be a woman. The best nurse can be a man. The important thing is to find the profession that suits you best. Then we want everyone to choose regardless of which gender norms are associated with the professions. That's freedom".

On 15 August, Brenna announced that the government would be starting work on establishing a National centre for vocational subjects, stating: "We know that Norway will need 90,000 skilled workers by 2035. We must ensure that vocational training is good and relevant, so that more people choose vocational subjects and that they complete with a certificate. A national center for vocational subjects can be a part of achieving these goals". Regarding whose responsibility the centre would fall under, she said: "What kind of tasks such a center should have and where it should be located must be investigated thoroughly. But the aim is that the center should contribute to developing long-term and targeted high-quality vocational and vocational training, and that it can be a point of contact for regional, national and international players in vocational and vocational training".

On 29 August, in response to reports of school refusals being reported to the Child Welfare Services, Brenna called for a report into children's absences from school. She stated: "Before the summer, I commissioned the Directorate of Education to assess how we can get better information about absences from school, and whether there is a need to introduce other measures to help students who are absent a lot". She also added that absences would be a part of a Storting message focusing on the well-being and motivation of fifth to tenth graders. Furthermore, the help services for children would also be strengthened and be obligated to work more together for children who need help.

In September, she expressed that changes should be made to the Russ time slot, and expressed concern for exclusions from Russ buses, while also calling for more inclusion and cooperation with counties to make that happen. This came in response to a case where 19 year old Frøy Hoftun Hedemark was excluded from her Russ bus and successfully sued the bus team for breach of contract.

On 30 September, Brenna rejected the idea from the Norwegian Young Conservatives member Nicolai Østeby to cancel autumn break in favour of more time for education in schools following the teacher' strike. She stated that it's up to the municipalities to determine the school schedule, and that the entire school schedule should be utilised.

On 17 October, she responded to a ban against school prayers by a Christian school in Balestrand against its students. The school's decision was also supported by Sogndal Municipality. She asserted that it was "traditional" to utilise school facilities to different sort of activities. The Christian Democrats praised her response, saying that they understood Brenna to subtly hold the municipality accountable without criticising their assessment. Norway's Christian Student and Youth Association on the other hand weren't surprised by Brenna's response. They argued that the "tradition" to utilise school facilities for different activities, she was referring to, was the exact one which in this case had been broken.

On 30 October, she warned against "joy grades" that were handed out to students during the COVID-19 pandemic, in private upper secondary schools in particular. The sharp increase in grades were also higher than the average given in public schools. Brenna also expressed concerns for grades being handed out in order to draw in more students.

Tonje Brenna on the Norwegian children news channel Supernytt in December of 2022

In early December, Brenna announced that an amendment to the Private School Act would be sent out on hearing. The amendment would entail local elected officials getting a say in the establishment of new private schools, something she deemed had been less of before. The opposition parties however opposed the idea, noting that such a function already was in place in the act, and that Brenna seemed to forget about students entirely.

==== 2023 ====
In January 2023, she rejected calls from the opposition to intervene in making sure that counties would ensure that municipalities would follow the law when it comes to registering students who are homeschooled. The calls from the opposition came in the wake of revelations of that the ten largest municipalities in the country lacked control and overview of children who are homeschooled. Brenna argued that the municipalities needed good strategies and routines in order to follow up on the matter. When asked what she would do about the issue, she mentioned that the rules of homeschooling would be an issue touched on in the new Education Act which would be in place by the next school term.

On 24 March, Brenna presented the government's proposal for a new education act. In it, the government proposes that students should be given the full right to upper secondary education until they complete it, in addition to changing their field of study. The law is scheduled to come into force by 2024.

In June, Verdens Gang revealed that Brenna had approved in May for a close friend, Frode Elgesem, to become a member of the central board of Wergelandsenteret who provides funds to Utøya AS, where her former spouse Martin Henriksen sits as a member. Brenna admitted to not having considered her impartiality, and reported the matter to the Storting's Standing Committee on Scrutiny and Constitutional Affairs and also asked for an interim minister to assume her duties while the matter is being investigated. International Development Minister Anne Beathe Tvinnereim was appointed interim minister.

In September, Brenna announced that 35 million NOK of the state budget would be allocated in order to combat bullying in schools.

On 16 October, Brenna was reassigned and was succeeded by Kari Nessa Nordtun in a cabinet reshuffle.

=== Minister of Labour and Social Inclusion ===
On 16 October 2023, Brenna was appointed minister of labour and social inclusion in a cabinet reshuffle.

==== 2023 ====
As one of her first acts as labour minister, Brenna wrote a 31-page-long response to a complaint by the European Free Trade Association Surveillance Authority, rejecting that Norway's rental ban was in breach with EEA guidelines.

Brenna substituted for prime minister Jonas Gahr Støre in negotiations for the 2024 state budget with coalition partner, the Centre Party, and their budget partner in parliament, the Socialist Left Party, while Støre was attending the 2023 United Nations Climate Change Conference. The budget negotiations began on 13 November and wrapped on 3 December.

Also in December, she presented the government's pension reform, which would entail that anyone born after 1964 would have to work for 2-3 additional years. Furthermore, disabled people would secure a better pension and be partly shielded from the pension age increase. Brenna cited that the reform would make more available workforce, provide the state with more taxes and lift the burden for future generations.

==== 2024 ====
In a joint press conference with justice minister Emilie Mehl on 29 January, the two announced additional measures for handling Ukrainian refugees. For her part, Brenna stated that the government expects Ukrainians to learn the language and provide for themselves. On the other hand she added that the government would provide work-oriented offers for refugees who might still enter the country.

Following a motion passsd by the Drammen Municipal Council to only accept and integrate Ukrainian refugees, Brenna spoke out against the motion, referring to it a "deteriorating step" against the Norwegian settlement model and a threat to settlement and labour integration in small municipalities.

The government managed to reach an agreement with the majority of opposition parties in late February about adjusting the retirement age from 70 to 72 for state employees. The Progress and Red parties opposed the agreement and both withdrew from the negotiations prior to the announcement. Brenna praised the agreement and the bipartisan consensus for it, calling it "historical" and that it displayed the possibility of reaching a wide bipartisan agreement to improve the retirement system.

Brenna announced in mid-March that the government would cover the costs for care services for veteran war sailors despite initially refusing to do so. A parliamentary majority consisting of all the opposition parties proposed earlier that month to force the government to pay the costs for veteran war sailors.

Brenna announced that a compulsory wage arbitration would be imposed on the strike conducted by the Federation of Norwegian Professional Associations when they threatened to take employees at the National Security Authority on strike as a major escalation of the strike. The strike had been ongoing since 24 May. Brenna reasoned that such an escalation would jeopardise the critical work done by the National Security Authority within matters of national security. Concurrently, the Confederation of Unions for Professionals had taken its members on strike since the same date and had notified that it would take members of the Norwegian Police Service and the Norwegian Meteorological Institute on strike. Brenna again announced a compulsory wage arbitration on 5 June in order to put the strike to an end. She reasoned that a report from the Ministry of Justice and Public Security expressed concerns for the strike's effect on the police, as the reason for the compulsory wage arbitration.

With the trend of sick leave becoming the highest in over fifteen years at 7.1%, Brenna expressed concerns about the development in September and didn't rule out drastic action from the government in the next decade. All the while both the Confederation of Norwegian Enterprise and Norwegian Confederation of Trade Unions expressed disagreements over if paid sick leave should be protected or not.

A majority consisting of the Conservative, Progress, Green, Red and Christian Democratic parties passed legislation in parliament in December to grant compensation to oil pioneers who suffered health injuries from chemical exposure while working offshore. In 2021, parliament had recommended the establishment of a commission to look into the issue. The commission presented their recommendation for compensation the year after, but action for this has been on hold since. Brenna expressed her support for the legislation, but said that the government couldn't guarantee when compensation would be given.

==== 2025 ====
In April, she proposed a serious of improved measures for the Norwegian Labour Inspection Authority to utilise while inspecting work places. Among these measures included a fine against company leaders and not just the company, seizure of documents and other evidence, gather information from third parties, handing out fines on site and allowing police to assist during inspections. Brenna argued that these measures would strengthen the agency's ability to prevent workplace crime. Her proposals also received support from parties across the political spectrum from notably the Conservatives, Socialist Left and Red parties.

She announced in June that the government would be putting forward a law proposal which would seek to protect children who would be at risk of being sent to Quran schools in countries like Kenya and Somalia with notably a travel ban. Brenna explained that the proposal would seek to punish parents who resorted to this measure and allow the child welfare service to stop attempts to leave the country for the aforementioned reason. Brenna conceded that the proposal wouldn't be passed during summer due to parliamentary recess, but hoped it could be passed by autumn and come into effect by early 2026.

Brenna summoned the leader of the Norwegian Labour and Welfare Administration Hans Christian Holte in for a crisis meeting in August following revelations of cuts in work measures by the Administration, which she argued was unnecessary, that "uncertainty had arisen" over their work and that her and her ministry were surprised by the information provided earlier about the cuts.

Brenna left cabinet following the 2025 parliamentary election in order to take over as parliamentary leader and was succeeded by Kjersti Stenseng in a minor cabinet reshuffle.

== Bibliography ==
- 22. juli – og alle dagene etterpå. J.M. Stenersens Forlag. 2021. ISBN 9788272017223. OCLC 1261713964.

Political offices
Preceded by Marte Mjøs Persen	Minister of Labour and Social Inclusion; 2023–2025	Succeeded by Kjersti Stenseng
Preceded by Guri Melby	Minister of Education; 2021–2023	Succeeded by Kari Nessa Nordtun
Office established	Chairwoman of the County Cabinet of Viken; 2020–2021	Succeeded by Siv Henriette Jacobsen
Party political offices
Preceded by Bjørnar Skjæran	Parliamentary Leader of the Labour Party; 2025–present	Incumbent
Preceded by Hadia Tajik	First Deputy Leader of the Labour Party; 2023–present	Incumbent
Preceded by Julie Lødrup	General Secretary of the Workers' Youth League; 2010–2012	Succeeded by Marianne Wilhelmsen
