= Hadia Tajik =

Norwegian politician (born 1983)

Hadia Tajik MP
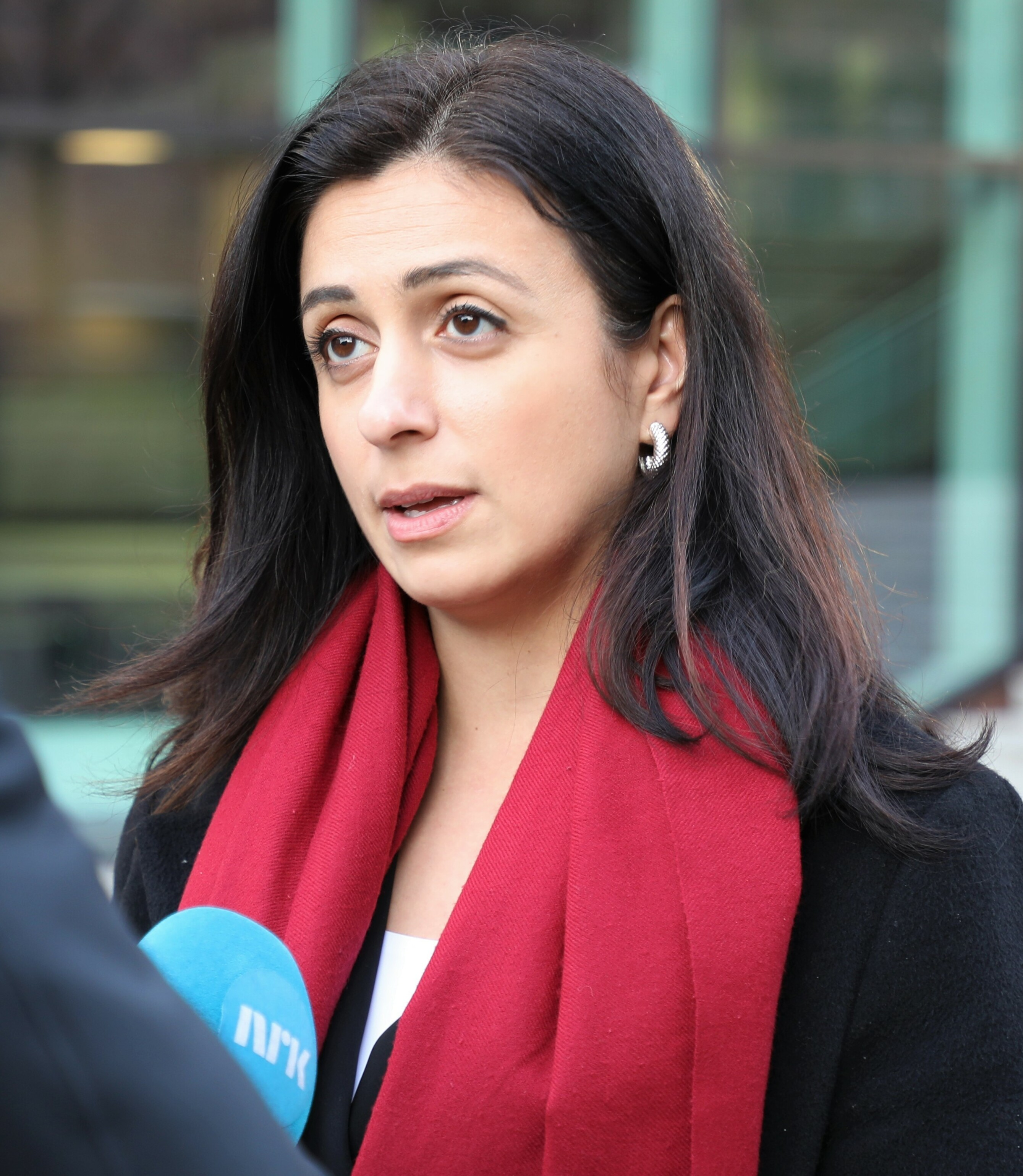
- Tajik in 2021

Minister of Labour and Social Inclusion
- In office 14 October 2021 – 4 March 2022
- Prime Minister: Jonas Gahr Støre
- Preceded by: Torbjørn Røe Isaksen
- Succeeded by: Marte Mjøs Persen

Minister of Culture
- In office 21 September 2012 – 16 October 2013
- Prime Minister: Jens Stoltenberg
- Preceded by: Anniken Huitfeldt
- Succeeded by: Thorhild Widvey

Member of the Norwegian Parliament
- In office 1 October 2017 – 30 September 2025
- Deputy: Tom Kalsås
- Constituency: Rogaland
- In office 1 October 2009 – 30 September 2017
- Deputy: Karin Yrvin; Prableen Kaur
- Constituency: Oslo

Deputy Leader of the Labour Party
- In office 18 April 2015 – 6 March 2022
- Leader: Jonas Gahr Støre
- Preceded by: Helga Pedersen
- Succeeded by: Tonje Brenna

Personal details
- Born: 18 July 1983 (age 43) Strand Municipality, Rogaland, Norway
- Party: Labour
- Spouses: Stefan Heggelund (m. 2014; div. 2016) Kristian Skard (m. 2021)
- Children: 1
- Education: University of Oslo; Stavanger University College; Kingston University

Hadia Tajik (born 18 July 1983) is a Pakistani-Norwegian jurist, journalist and politician from the Labour Party. She served as Minister of Labour and Social Inclusion from 2021 to 2022, where after several tax evasions and misuse of appointed apartments, she resigned from the post. She previously served as Minister of Culture from 2012 to 2013. She was 29 years of age at the time and became the youngest minister to serve in the Norwegian government. She is the first Cabinet member that is a Muslim. Tajik served as a Member of Parliament representing Rogaland from 2017 to 2025, and Oslo from 2009 to 2017. She was also the party's deputy leader from 2015 until 2022.

== Early life and education ==
Hadia Tajik was born on 18 July 1983 in the village of Bjørheimsbygd in Strand Municipality, Rogaland, to Mohammad Sarwar Tajik (born 1947) and Safia Qazalbash (born 1948), immigrants from Pakistan in 1974. After completing Bjørheimsbygd Primary School as one of only seven pupils, she attended Tau Lower Secondary School between 1996 and 1998 and later Strand Upper Secondary School from 1998 to 2001.

She has a bachelor's degree in journalism from Stavanger University College, after which she studied human rights at Kingston University in England from 2004 to 2005, earning a Master's degree. She subsequently enrolled in and studied law at the University of Oslo receiving her Master of Law degree in 2012.

== Political career ==
Tajik was active in politics from an early age, and was the leader of the Strand chapter of the Workers' Youth League (AUF) from 1999 to 2002, before becoming deputy leader of the Rogaland AUF from until 2003. She served as an advisor for the Minister of Labour and Social Inclusion, Bjarne Håkon Hanssen, from 2006 to 2008. In 2008 she temporarily held the position of advisor to the Prime Minister Jens Stoltenberg. Subsequently, from 2008 to 2009, she served as political advisor to the Minister of Justice, Knut Storberget.

While serving under Storberget, she was accused of being involved in the so-called hijab-affair. The incident occurred when the Ministry of Justice withdrew a proposal to allow female police officers to wear the hijab in the service, as a result of fierce uproar. The proposal was authored by Tajik and fellow state secretary Astri Aas-Hansen, and the final decision was allegedly made by them without consulting Storberget. The allegations were never confirmed, but when the ministry announced its decision, the media felt the minister left the impression that the two women were to blame. Later, in 2009, she again served as an advisor for the Minister of Labour and Social Inclusion.

In March 2022, Gunnar Stavrum said that Tajik was the Støre Cabinet's minister that had accomplished the most, and who had opened for changes that are popular with the left wing - such as prohibiting temporary service agencies and rental of labour.

=== Parliament ===
On 14 September 2009, Tajik was elected Member of Parliament for the Norwegian Labour Party. Representing Oslo, she was listed as candidate number six on the Labour ticket, which was considered a safe seat. During her tenure in parliament, she was a member of the Standing Committee on Education, Research and Church Affairs as well as the Election committee. She has been nominated in second spot on the Oslo Labour party ballot for the 2013 Norwegian parliamentary election. After the 2013 parliamentary elections and the fall of the Labour-led government, Tajik retained her seat in the Storting from Oslo. She was subsequently named as leader of the Standing Committee on Justice, which is considered one of the most prestigious posts in the Storting. In 2019, she was appointed spokesperson on financial policy and deputy parliamentary leader.

In March 2024, Tajik announced that she wouldn't be seeking re-election as a candidate for Rogaland, for the 2025 election; however, she has not ruled out that she will be a candidate for Oslo. However, she lost the Oslo nomination to Kamzy Gunaratnam in November.

=== Minister of Culture ===
On 21 September 2012, as part of a larger cabinet reshuffle, prime minister Jens Stoltenberg announced that Tajik would become the new Minister of Culture. She replaced Anniken Huitfeldt who became the new Minister of Labour and Social affairs. At the time, she was the youngest ever to become a minister in Norway (at 29), and her appointment made her the first Muslim to serve in the Norwegian cabinet.

She resigned in the fall of 2013, along with the rest of the cabinet following the electoral defeat in the 2013 parliamentary elections.

Tajik is an enthusiastic user of social media, and an avid supporter of E-books, and as a result she was often called Norway's "first digital Minister of Culture".

=== Minister of Labour and Social Inclusion ===
On 14 October 2021, Tajik was appointed minister of labour, social inclusion and integration in Støre's Cabinet.

==== 2021 ====
A few days after her appointment, Tajik reiterated that the government would be open to put in special rules regarding hiring in certain workplaces. She also said it was important for the government to do it in a proper and thorough way, while also conducting law work beforehand.

After pilots that were terminated by SAS start to demand their jobs back following the COVID-19 pandemic, Tajik stated: "We have seen that workers who are well qualified experience that the company creates a new subsidiary, where they have to apply for their position again. It is not a neat way to do it, and a situation that we want to avoid. The SAS conflict raises this issue". The pilots and remaining staff were unable to get their jobs, and were required to apply for their original jobs again. Tajik further said that she would be working with her other Nordic counterparts in a call for tether cooperation. She expressed understanding regarding the situation and said that the government would also work to strengthen workers’ rights.

On 15 November, Tajik and Minister of Transport Jon-Ivar Nygård met the head of SAS Norway, Kjetil Håbjørg, regarding the ongoing conflict with its staff. Tajik questioned Håbjørg why the pilots and other staff had little confidence in the leadership. Tajik also indicated that she would not back down on the matter, and explained that she wanted to take the effected staff into account.

On 2 December, Tajik announced that she would introduce pension for the first kroner for those over the age of 13, starting in 2022. Of the change, she said: "We are now changing this, in that everyone over the age of 13 receives earnings from the first kroner they earn - they do not have to wait until they have earned 106,000 kroner. And you get it no matter how small a position fraction you have".

On 14 December, Tajik attended a press conference alongside Trygve Slagsvold Vedum, Jan Christian Vestre and Anette Trettebergstuen to present the government's economic COVID-19 measures. In regards to her field of responsibility, Tajik announced that the government is extending the legal basis for advance payment of unemployment benefits, so that those who need money would receive them. She also announced that there would be a continuation of the legal authority that ensures advance payment of unemployment benefits, if necessary. She stated: "We do not want people to go into Christmas with a lump in their stomach. These are days for which this welfare state exists". Tajik went on to say: "This has two purposes: Securing people who are unable to work due to infection control measures, so that they have an income they can live on - and ensure more social justice".

On 31 December, Tajik announced that the government would give labour unions access to collective redress. She said that the government wanted to strengthen the workers’ power over their everyday lives. The reintroduction of collective redress received mixed reception from labour organisations, with some praising it and some opposing it due to the risk of conflict that could arise. Tajik rejected the suggestion of increased level of conflict, saying: "I register that the central supervisors, Norwegian Labour Inspection Authority and Petroleum Safety Authority, do not share NHO's assessment. They support the proposal and believe it can complement their oversight. I emphasize the auditors' experience".

==== 2022 ====
In January, she and transport minister Jon-Ivar Nygård announced that the government would take action against "workplace crime" in the transport sector. Tajik assessed that a driver who is tired, underpaid and overworked is "a dangerous driver for everyone". She also cited that drivers were "wrongly asked" to behave like independent self-employed.

On 17 January, Tajik announced that she had asked the Petroleum Safety Authority and the Norwegian Labour Inspection Authority to impose more fines against unserious actors. This would also include more fees and increased punishment.

In February, she expressed sympathy and understanding for the difficult situation faced by the effected victims of the social security scandal that happened under the previous government. She did however not make any promises in order to help the victims. Instead, she encouraged people who thought they might have been effected by the scandal, to get in touch with the Norwegian Labour and Welfare Administration.

At a press conference on 2 March, she announced that she had asked to resign as minister after further developments regarding two controversies: avoiding tax on a fringe benefit - and her use (in 2019) of a government apartment. She formally resigned on 4 March.

== Controversies ==
=== Government apartment ===
In a 18 February 2022 post on her Facebook page, Tajik accused Aftenposten for wanting to make a scandal out of her usage of a parliamentary apartment in 2019. She said that Aftenposten had forced her to admit that she misused the system for three months in 2019 or openly discuss her security situation, the latter which she refused to discuss. Trine Eilertsen, the editor for Aftenposten, replied (on Tajik's Facebook page) that Aftenposten had tried to get an interview with Tajik since 31 January, and Tajik only wanted to give answers in writing.

On 21 February, Marianne Andreassen, a civil servant and chief of parliament's administrative office, said that [... the office] should have taken a closer look, before use of the apartment was given to Tajik.

=== Avoiding tax on a fringe benefit ===
On 20 February 2022, Verdens Gang revealed that Tajik in 2006 had used a rental contract for an apartment in Rogaland, to avoid paying tax on use of a government apartment in Oslo; she never used or paid for the apartment in Rogaland, and the authorities were never informed. On 22 February, Trygve Hegnar, the chief editor of Finansavisen, said that the case was one of cheating and fraud to avoid paying tax. Later that day, the Office of the Prime Minister (SMK) confirmed that the rental contract (from Rogaland) was the reason that she had been exempted from being taxed on the use of the government apartment. The same day, Kristin Clemet said that Tajik omitted informing SMK - her employer (in 2006) - even though Tajik knew that she had information that was of relevance to her "tax situation". On 23 February, prime minister Jonas Gahr Støre was asked if he was informed about the use of the rental contract (from Rogaland) during the vetting before she became a cabinet member; something he refused to comment. Gunnar Stavrum, the editor of Nettavisen, said that she apparently wrongfully avoided paying tax, and estimated that her profit was around 100,000 to 150,000 Norwegian kroner. On 23 February, Tajik said that she is going to pay tax on the amount that was her benefit for having a government apartment during 2006–2010. Later that day, Eivind Furuseth (expert on tax law) said that had the matter gone to trial (prior to the expiration of the statute of limitations), then the outcome could have been a prison sentence.

In 2006 she was a political advisor to then labour minister Bjarne Håkon Hanssen.

== Other ==
On 22 July 2011, Tajik was visiting the Workers' Youth League summer camp at Utøya together with former prime minister Gro Harlem Brundtland. They left a few hours before Anders Behring Breivik arrived, thus narrowly avoiding the massacre.

Tajik was chosen as one of the two deputy leaders of the party at the national party congress in 2015. On 6 March 2022, two days after resigning as minister of labour and social inclusion, Tajik announced that she also would be resigning as deputy leader.

Tajik became the first woman of a minority background to be listed as the most powerful woman in Norway, in a list by Kapital in November 2021.

In February 2025, it was announced that she would be joining the law firm Haavind as an attorney-at-law and advisor following the 2025 election.

== Personal life ==
Hadia Tajik was married to Stefan Heggelund, a communications consultant and politician for the Conservative Party. They decided to make their relationship public because there was a chance they would both be elected to Parliament in the 2013 election. Both Tajik and Heggelund were subsequently elected as MPs. On 26 June 2014, the couple announced that they were getting married, in a private wedding ceremony on 28 June 2014. Tajik and Heggelund had their wedding at the hotel The Thief in Oslo, with a number of politicians from the Labour and Conservative parties amongst the guest. They announced their divorce in February 2016.

Tajik announced in November 2018 that she had started dating Kristian Skard, a reporter from Dagens Næringsliv, who notably stood behind some of the revelations that led to Labour Party deputy Trond Giske resigning. Skard announced in May 2019 that he had proposed to Tajik, and she had accepted. They were originally meant to have their wedding on 22 August 2020, but it was postponed to 19 June 2021 due to the ongoing COVID-19 pandemic. In January 2021, she gave birth to their daughter, Sofia.

Tajik describes herself as a Muslim, although non-practicing, saying "I am a politician, who happens to be Muslim, but I am not a Muslim politician."

== Bibliography ==
- 2001 Tajik, Hadia: Svart på Hvitt, Tiden Norsk forlag
- 2009 Giske, Trond; Tajik, Hadia: "Hvem snakker for Bob Kåre?", i Mangfold eller enfold, Aschehoug

Political offices
Preceded by Anniken Huitfeldt	Minister of Culture; 2012–2013	Succeeded by Thorhild Widvey
Preceded by Torbjørn Røe Isaksen	Minister of Labour and Social Inclusion; 2021–2022	Succeeded by Marte Mjøs Persen
Party political offices
Preceded by Helga Pedersen	First Deputy Leader of the Labour Party; 2015–2022	Succeeded by Tonje Brenna
Preceded by N/A	Deputy Parliamentary Leader of the Labour Party; 2019–2021	Succeeded by Terje Aasland
