= Karianne Bråthen =

Norwegian politician

Deputy Member of the Storting
- Incumbent
- Assumed office 1 October 2021
- Deputising for: Bjørnar Skjæran (2021–2023, 2025)
- Constituency: Nordland

Mayor of Øksnes Municipality
- In office 20 October 2015 – 8 October 2019
- Deputy: Jonny Rinde Johansen
- Preceded by: Jørn Martinussen
- Succeeded by: John Harald Danielsen

Personal details
- Born: 2 August 1974 (age 51)
- Party: Labour
- Spouse: Håvard Bråthen
- Occupation: Politician

Karianne Bråthen (born 2 August 1974) is a Norwegian politician from the Labour Party. She has served as a deputy member of the Storting from Nordland since 2021. She previously served as mayor of Øksnes Municipality from 2015 to 2019.

== Political career ==
=== Parliament ===
She was elected deputy representative to the Storting from the constituency of Nordland at the 2021 parliamentary election. She deputised for Bjørnar Skjæran from 2021 to 2023 when he served in government, and again in 2025 when he re-entered government.

In the Storting, she was a member of the Standing Committee on Business and Industry from 2021 to 2023, as well as member of the Storting delegation to the Nordic Council.

=== Local politics ===
She previously served as mayor of Øksnes Municipality between 2015 and 2019. Following the 2015 local elections, the Labour Party formed a majority with the Conservative Party, Socialist Left Party and the Christian Democrats, with the Conservatives' Jonny Rinde Johansen as deputy mayor. Bråthen was also Øksnes' first female mayor. She officially assumed office on 20 October. She was succeeded by John Harald Danielsen following the 2019 local elections.

== Personal life ==
Bråthen is married to Håvard Bråthen and is originally from Alta. The couple moved to Øksnes in 2006, which was also her husband's home municipality.
