= Stefan Heggelund =

Norwegian politician (born 1984)

Stefan Heggelund MP
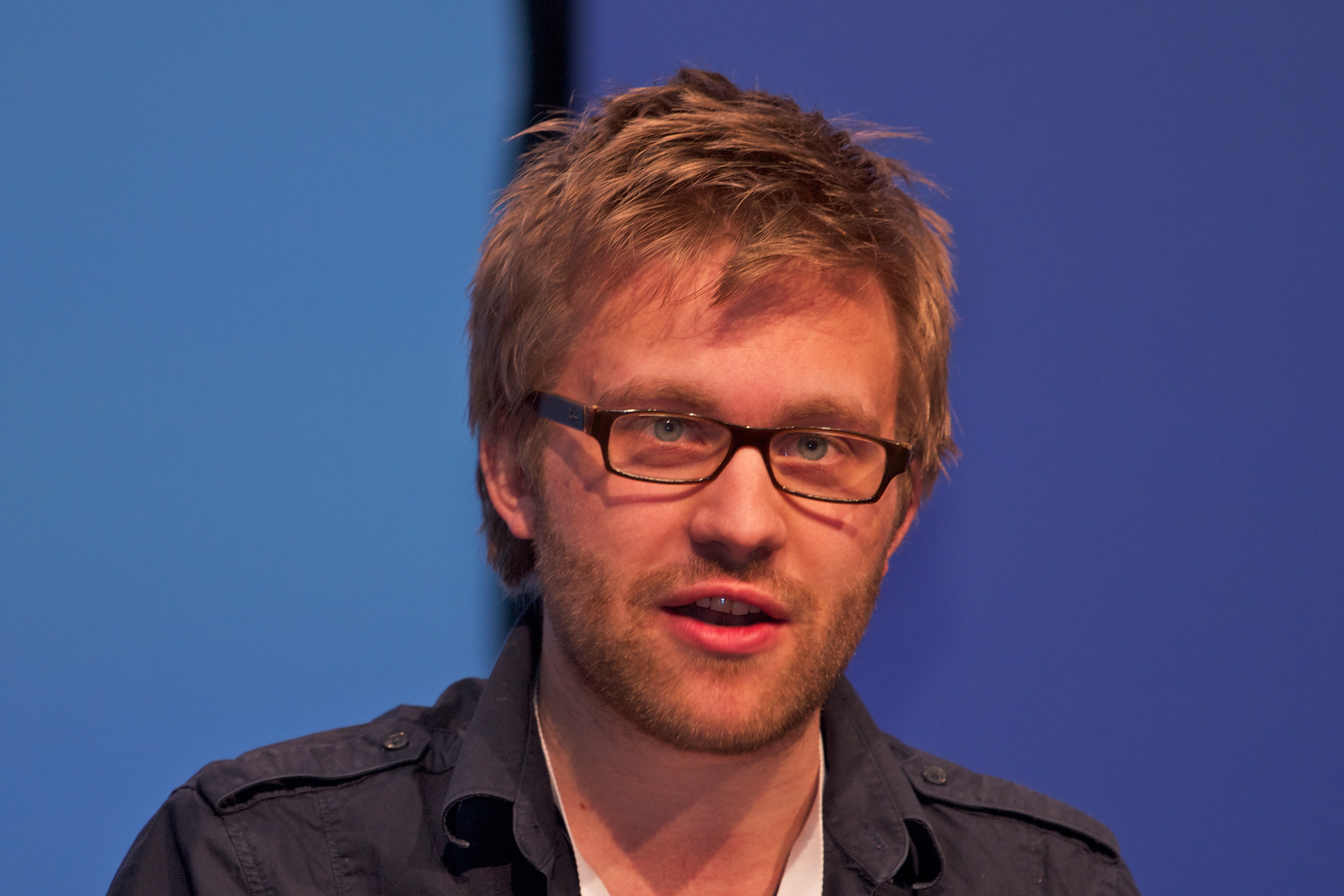

Member of the Norwegian Parliament
- In office 1 October 2013 – 30 September 2021
- Constituency: Oslo

Personal details
- Born: 8 October 1984 (age 41) Lørenskog, Akershus, Norway
- Party: Conservative
- Spouse(s): Hadia Tajik (m. 2014; div. 2016) Jorunn Hallaråker (m. 2019)
- Children: 1

Stefan Magnus Brittmark Heggelund (born 8 October 1984) is a Norwegian communication consultant and politician for the Conservative Party. He served as a member of parliament for Oslo from 2013 to 2021.

== Early life ==
Heggelund grew up in the affluent Røa neighbourhood in Oslo. His mother is a teacher.

== Political career ==
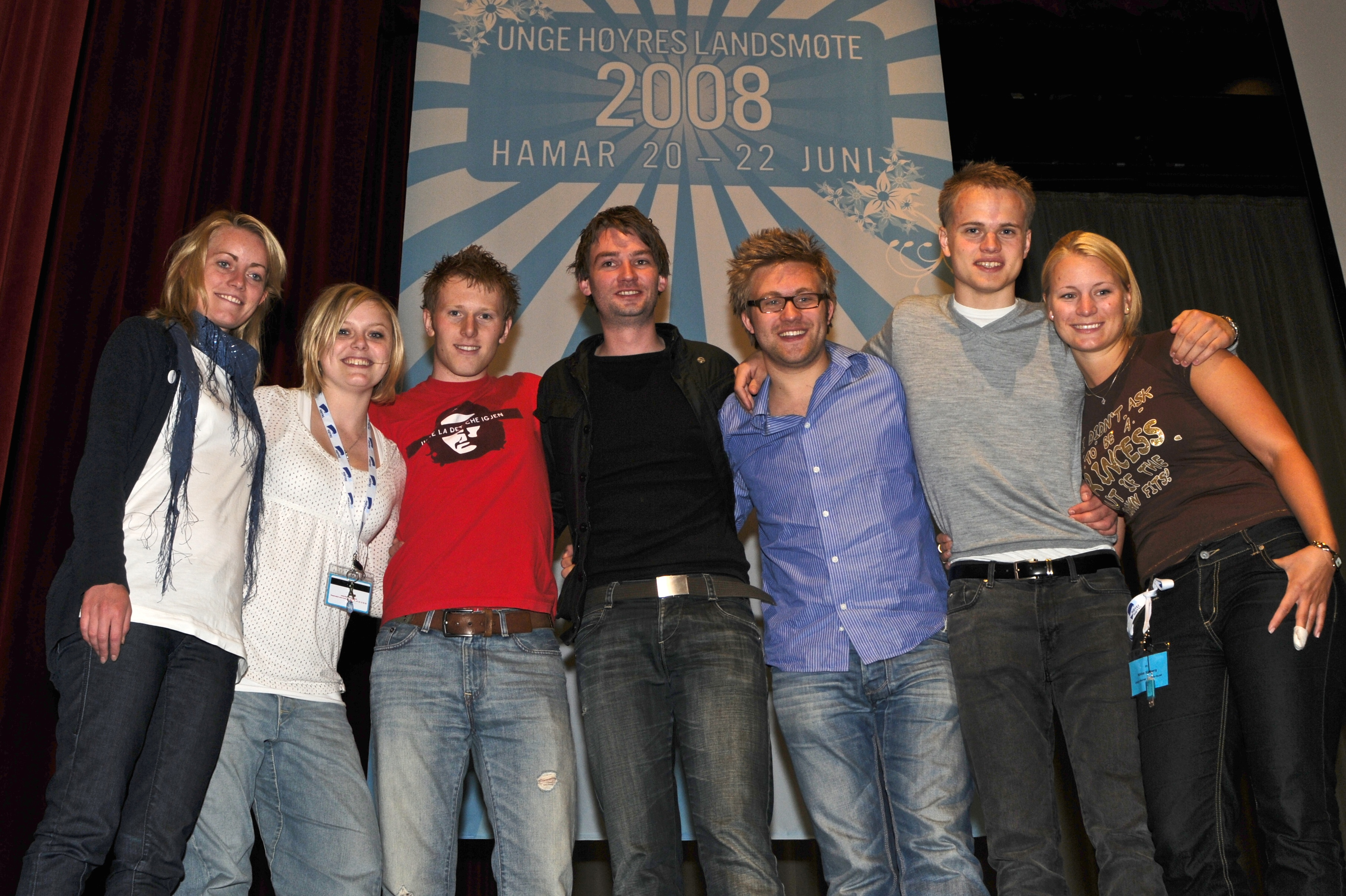
Heggelund (third from right) at the convention for the Norwegian Young Conservatives in 2008.

He joined the Socialist Youth when he was 13. In 1999, he switched to the Norwegian Young Conservatives.

He was leader of Vestre Aker Young Conservatives from 2004 to 2005 and led Oslo Young Conservatives from 2005 to 2006. He was a member of the Central Committee of the Young Conservatives from 2006 to 2010, serving as 2. deputy leader for the organization from 2008 to 2010. He candidated for the leadership position of the Young Conservatives, but lost to Henrik Asheim who was reelected.

In 2007 and 2009, he served as city government secretary for vice mayor Merete Agerbak-Jensen. He was elected to the Oslo city council in 2011, where he is a member of the Culture and Education Committee.

In 2013, he was elected to the Parliament of Norway, having been nominated in the 6th spot on the Conservative Party ballot in Oslo. He was re-elected in 2017, but sought not to seek re-election in 2021 after losing the nomination to Michael Tetzschner.

== Civil career ==
Heggelund has a bachelor's degree in information and communications from BI Norwegian Business School, Oslo. He worked for the communication firm JKL group from 2009 to 2011, when he started working as a communications consultant for Nordic Choice Hotels. He was named one of Norway's biggest communication experts by Dagens Næringsliv in 2012.

== Personal life ==
In December 2012, Heggelund and Labour politician Hadia Tajik, who served as Norway's Minister of Culture, announced that they were a couple. Both were elected for Oslo to the Norwegian parliament in the 2013 Norwegian parliamentary election. The couple married on 28 June 2014 and got separated in 2016. Heggelund resides in Grünerløkka.

He would later go on to marry Jorunn Hallaråker, a fellow politician from the Christian Democratic Party, with whom he has one son.
