= Siv Henriette Jacobsen =

Norwegian politician (born 1966)

Siv Henriette Jacobsen (born 14 January 1966) is a Norwegian politician for the Labour Party. She has been the Chairwoman of the County Cabinet of Viken since 14 October 2021, succeeding Tonje Brenna.

She served as a deputy representative to the Parliament of Norway from Østfold during the terms 2005–2009 and 2017–2021. Hailing from Andøy Municipality, she studied in the US and settled at Jeløya. After stints in the municipal council for Moss Municipality and the Østfold county council, she became deputy county mayor in 2015. She became county commissioner for education and competence after Viken county was established and held this position until she became chairwoman of the county cabinet.
