= Farukh Qureshi =

Norwegian politician (born 1986)

Deputy Member of the Storting
- Incumbent
- Assumed office 1 October 2021
- Deputising for: Jan Christian Vestre (2025–2026); Kamzy Gunaratnam (2026–)
- Constituency: Oslo

Personal details
- Born: 6 January 1986 (age 40)
- Party: Labour

Farukh Qureshi (born 6 January 1986) is a Norwegian politician serving as a deputy member of the Storting since 2021.

He was re-elected deputy member of the Storting in 2025 and has since 1 October 2025 entered the Storting as a permanent substitute for Minister of Health and Care Services Jan Christian Vestre (until 11 September 2026) and Minister of Transport Kamzy Gunaratnam (since 11 September 2026). He has been a member of the Oslo City Council since 2019.
