= Prableen Kaur =

Norwegian politician (born 1993)

Prableen Kaur (born 20 March 1993) is a Norwegian politician for the Labour Party.

She is from Romsås and of Punjabi Sikh descent. She was elected as a deputy representative to the Parliament of Norway from Oslo in 2013. As Hadia Tajik from Oslo was a member of the outgoing Stoltenberg's Second Cabinet, Kaur met as a regular representative during the two weeks before the cabinet change. As of 2016, she had declined [being a candidate] for [the parliamentary] election [in 2017].

In 2011, she survived the Utøya massacre. She was deputy leader of the Oslo Workers' Youth League, a post she left in February 2012. In the 2011 Norwegian local elections she was elected into Oslo city council, as the youngest representative ever. The Norwegian magazine Ny Tid voted Kaur as "Norwegian of the year 2011".

She attended Oslo Cathedral School.
