= Karin Yrvin =

Norwegian politician

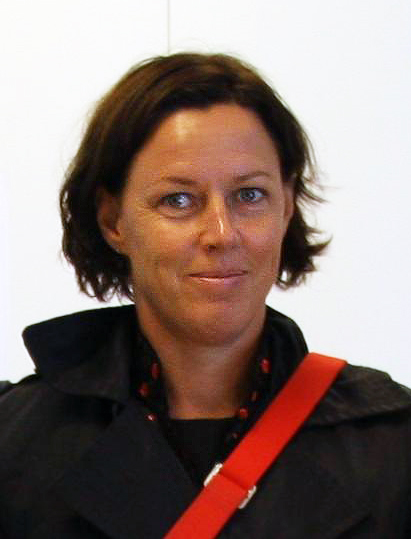
Karin Yrvin in 2009

Karin Yrvin (born 20 June 1970) is a Norwegian politician for the Labour Party.

She was born in Nittedal and took her upper secondary education at Bjertnes and Skedsmo from 1986 to 1989. She then studied at Trondheim Business School from 1990 to 1992 and the University of Oslo from 1992 to 1999, graduating with the cand.polit. degree.

She was the Labour Party secretary of women's affairs from 1998 to 2004, and at the same time a national board member of the party and board member of Party of European Socialists. She was also a national board member of the Norwegian Civil Service Union from 1998 to 2002.

She served as a deputy representative to the Parliament of Norway from Oslo during the terms 2001–2005, 2005–2009 and 2009–2013. From 2005 to 2006 she was a State Secretary in the Ministry of Trade and Shipping as a part of Stoltenberg's Second Cabinet. She became a full member of Parliament in 2012, when Hadia Tajik was appointed to cabinet.
