= Rigmor Aasrud =

Norwegian politician (born 1960)

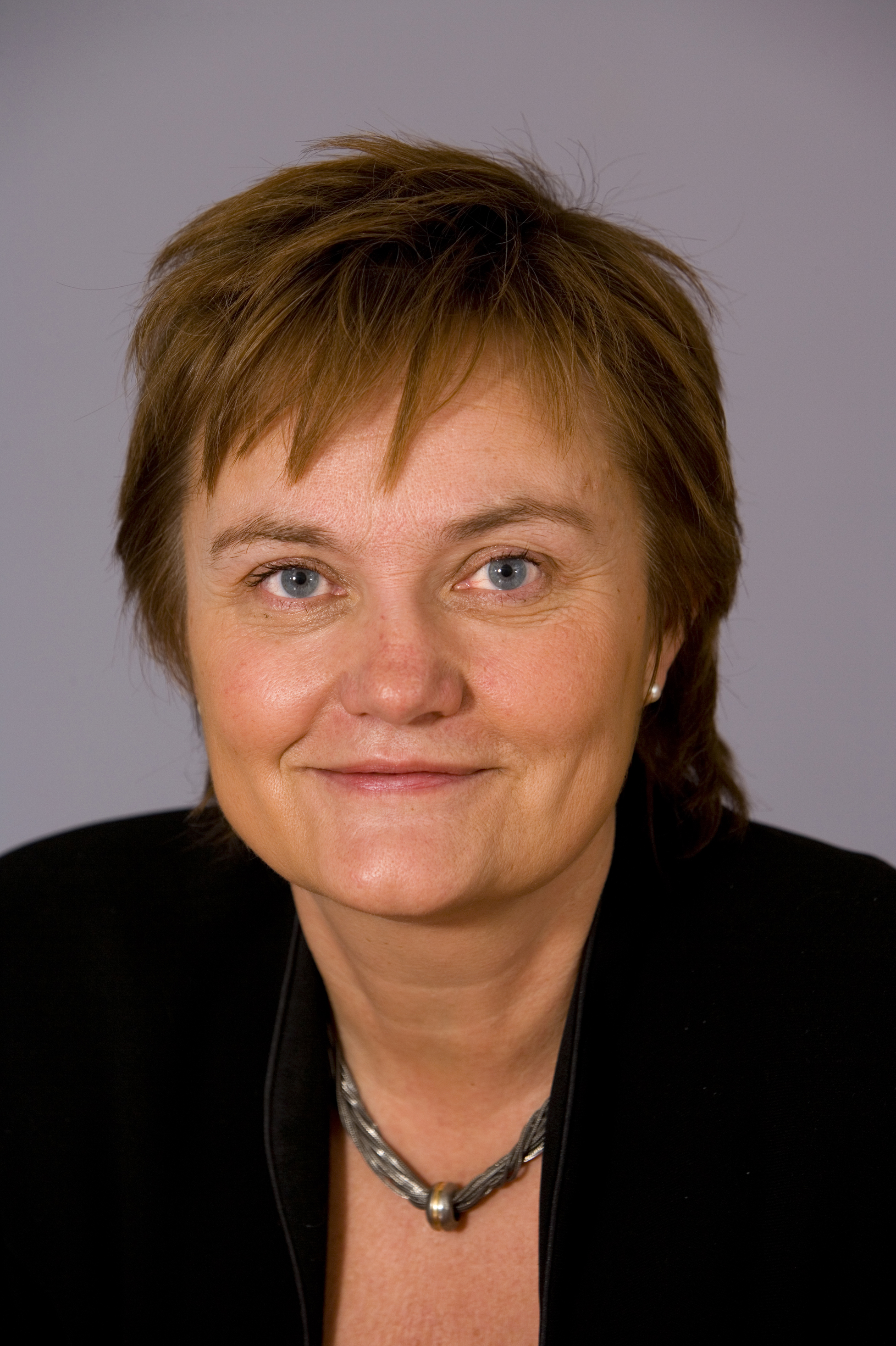

Parliamentary Leader of the Labour Party
- In office 13 October 2021 – 4 February 2025
- Deputy: Terje Aasland; Åsmund Grøver Aukrust; Lene Vågslid
- Leader: Jonas Gahr Støre
- Preceded by: Jonas Gahr Støre
- Succeeded by: Bjørnar Skjæran

Minister of Government Administration and Reform
- In office 20 October 2009 – 16 October 2013
- Prime Minister: Jens Stoltenberg
- Preceded by: Heidi Grande Røys
- Succeeded by: Position abolished

Minister of Church Affairs
- In office 20 October 2009 – 16 October 2013
- Prime Minister: Jens Stoltenberg
- Preceded by: Trond Giske
- Succeeded by: Position abolished (became part of Ministry of Culture)

Minister of Nordic Cooperation
- In office 20 October 2009 – 16 October 2013
- Prime Minister: Jens Stoltenberg
- Preceded by: Heidi Grande Røys
- Succeeded by: Elisabeth Aspaker

Minister of Labour and Social Inclusion
- Acting; 20 October 2009 – 20 December 2009
- Prime Minister: Jens Stoltenberg
- Preceded by: Dag Terje Andersen
- Succeeded by: Hanne Bjurstrøm

Member of the Storting
- In office 1 October 2009 – 30 September 2025
- Deputy: Stine Renate Håheim; Kjersti Stenseng
- Constituency: Oppland

Personal details
- Born: 26 June 1960 (age 65) Jevnaker, Oppland, Norway
- Party: Labour
- Children: 1

Rigmor Aasrud (born 26 June 1960) is a Norwegian politician for the Labour Party. She served as member of parliament for Oppland from 2009 to 2025, having previously been a deputy member between 1993 and 2005. She also served as the party's parliamentary leader from 2021 to 2025 and also held several government positions during Jens Stoltenberg's second premiership between 2005 and 2013.

== Political career ==
=== Parliament ===
She was elected deputy representative to the Storting from Oppland at the 1993 election and held the position until 2005. She was elected as a regular representative following the 2009 election and has been re-elected since.

A day before Jonas Gahr Støre assumed office as prime minister following the 2021 election, Aasrud was elected the next parliamentary leader succeeding Støre, at a party group meeting. Terje Aasland was elected her deputy. When Aasland was appointed to government in March 2022, Åsmund Grøver Aukrust and Lene Vågslid took over as deputies.

In May 2024, she announced that she wouldn't be seeking re-election at the 2025 election.

She was replaced by Bjørnar Skjæran on 4 February 2025.

=== Government ===
When the second cabinet Stoltenberg assumed office following the 2005 elections, Aasrud was appointed State Secretary in the Ministry of Health and Care Services. On 20 October 2009, Aasrud was appointed Minister of Government Administration and Church Affairs. She was also acting minister of labour and social inclusion until December 2009, when Hanne Bjurstrøm officially assumed the position.

=== Local politics ===
From 1995 to 2005 Aasrud was mayor of Gran Municipality. She had previously been a member of the municipal council from 1983 to 1991.

== Personal life ==
Aasrud has one daughter and resides in western Gran.
