= Kari Baadstrand Sandnes =

Norwegian politician (born 1969)

Deputy Member of the Storting
- Incumbent
- Assumed office 1 October 2025
- Deputising for: Bjørnar Skjæran (2025–)
- Constituency: Nordland

Personal details
- Born: 15 May 1969 (age 56)
- Party: Labour Party

Kari Marie Baadstrand Sandnes (born 15 May 1969) is a Norwegian politician and deputy member of the Storting. A member of the Labour Party, she has represented Nordland since October 2025.

Sandnes was born on 15 May 1969 and lives in Gravdal. She is a qualified nurse and has worked in primary and specialist health care since 1988. She has studied administrative policy, labour law and project work at the University of Bergen and Nord University. She is a regional board member of the Norwegian Union of Municipal and General Employees in Nordland and leader of LO Stat in Nordland. She is deputy leader of the Arbeidssamvirketiltak (ASVO), a co-operative for disabled workers, in her local municipality. She has been a board member of the Northern Norway Regional Health Authority since 2002.

Sandnes is a member of the municipal council in Vestvågøy. She was the Labour Party's fourth placed candidate in Nordland at the 2025 parliamentary election but the party won only three seats in the constituency. She became the party's first deputy representative (Vararepresentant) in the constituency. She entered the Storting on 1 October 2025 as a permanent substitute for Minister of Local Government and Regional Development Bjørnar Skjæran.
