= Kari-Anne Opsal =

Norwegian politician

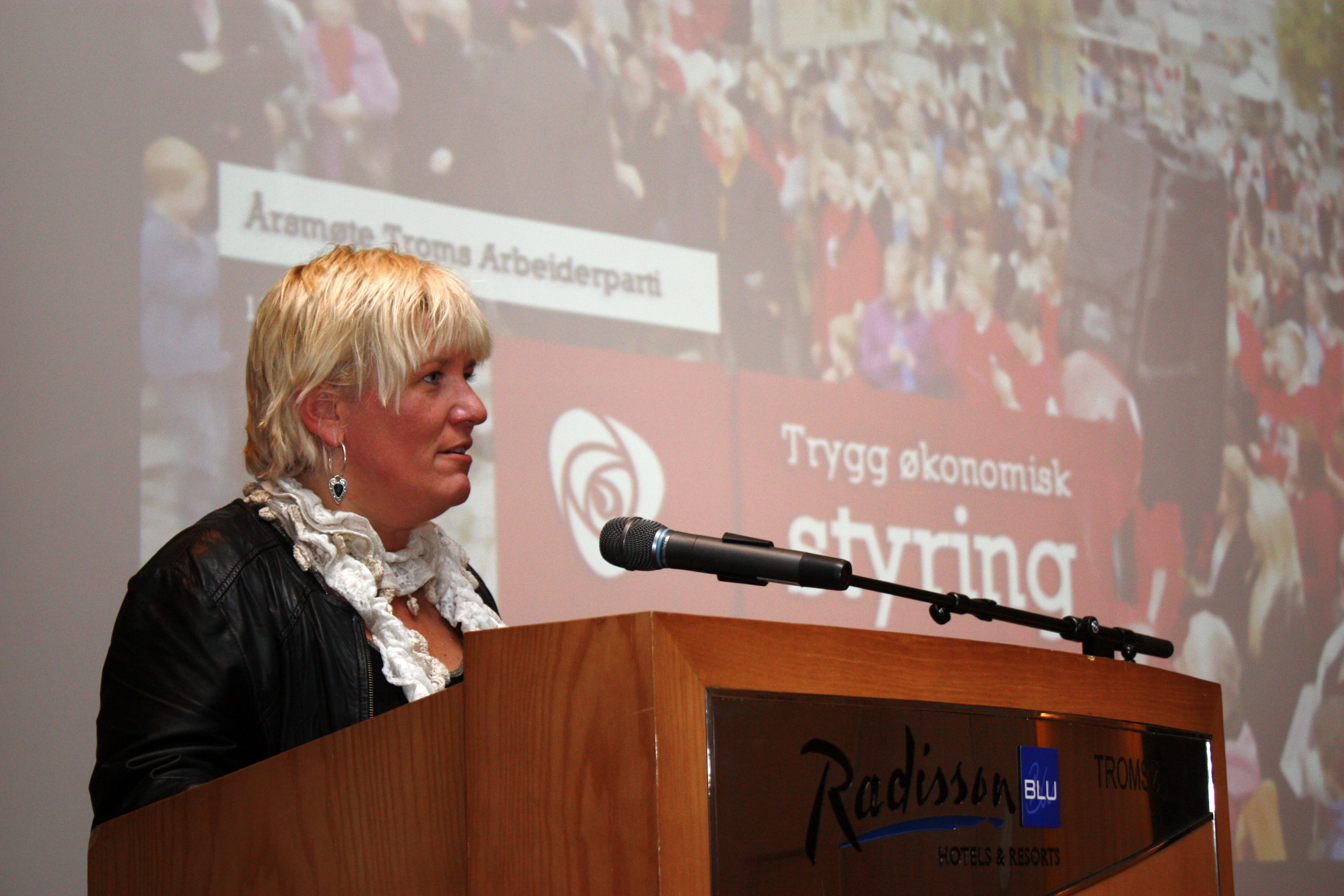

Party Secretary of the Labour Party
- Incumbent
- Assumed office 3 April 2025
- Leader: Jonas Gahr Støre
- Preceded by: Kjersti Stenseng

Mayor of Harstad Municipality
- In office 1 August 2019 – 8 April 2025
- Deputy: Maria Serafia Fjellstad; Espen Ludviksen
- Preceded by: Marianne Bremnes
- Succeeded by: Elise Marie Stenhaug

Troms County Commissioner for Planning and Industry
- In office 18 October 2011 – 18 March 2013
- Cabinet Chair: Pia Svensgaard
- Preceded by: Knut Werner Hansen
- Succeeded by: Willy Ørnebakk

Troms County Commissioner for Transport
- In office 14 March 2009 – 18 October 2011
- Cabinet Chair: Pia Svensgaard
- Preceded by: Synnøve Søndergaard
- Succeeded by: Terje Olsen

Personal details
- Born: 10 May 1967 (age 59) Torsken (now Senja), Norway
- Party: Labour
- Education: University of Tromsø
- Occupation: Lawyer

Kari-Anne Opsal (born 10 May 1967) is a Norwegian politician for the Labour Party. She was State Secretary in the Ministry of Fisheries and Coastal Affairs from 2006 to 2007, and mayor of Harstad from 2019 to 2025. She was elected party secretary of the Labour Party in 2025.

== Personal life and education ==
Born on 10 May 1967 in Torsken (now Senja), Opsal hails from Gryllefjord. She is educated jurist from the University of Tromsø, and practiced as lawyer since 2001.

She is a former president of the Norwegian Bridge Federation, and as of 2025 vice president of the European Bridge League and a board member of the World Bridge Federation.

== Political career ==
=== Local politics ===
Representing the Labour Party, Opsal has been elected member of the municipal council of Harstad from 1999. She served as deputy mayor of Harstad from 2003 to 2005 and later mayor from 2019 to 2025. She took over from Marianne Bremnes, who resigned in order to start in a new job. She was elected to a full term in autumn of 2019 and re-elected in 2023. She resigned in April 2025 in order to become party secretary of the nationwide Labour Party and was succeeded by Elise Marie Stenhaug.

Opsal was a member of the Troms county cabinet between 2009 and 2013, holding the positions of county commissioner for transport from 2009 to 2011 and then planning and industry from 2011 to 2013. She resigned in March 2013 to take a job in her native Harstad and was succeeded by Willy Ørnebakk. She caused some controversy during her tenure, when she berated a voter who complained about poor road maintenance in April 2011. Opsal later apologised for the incident and explained that she had felt provoked and had overreacted.

=== Government ===
She was advisor to the Ministry of Fisheries and Coastal Affairs from 2005 to 2006, and state secretary from 2006 to 2007.

=== Parliament ===
She was elected deputy representative to the Storting from the constituency of Troms for the period from 2017 to 2021.

=== Party politics ===
At the party convention in April 2025, she was elected party secretary for the Labour Party, succeeding Kjersti Stenseng, having been recommended by the election committee led by Peggy Hessen Følsvik.
