= Malin Bye Sørensen =

Norwegian politician (born 1985)

Deputy Member of the Storting
- Incumbent
- Assumed office 1 October 2025
- Deputising for: Jan Christian Vestre (2026–)
- Constituency: Oslo

Personal details
- Born: 27 July 1985 (age 41)
- Party: Labour Party

Malin Bye Sørensen (born 27 July 1985) is a Norwegian politician for the Labour Party.

Serving as a deputy member of the Storting since 2025, she has since 11 September 2026 entered the Storting as a permanent substitute for Minister of Health and Care Services Jan Christian Vestre.
