= Anne Beathe Tvinnereim =

Norwegian diplomat and politician

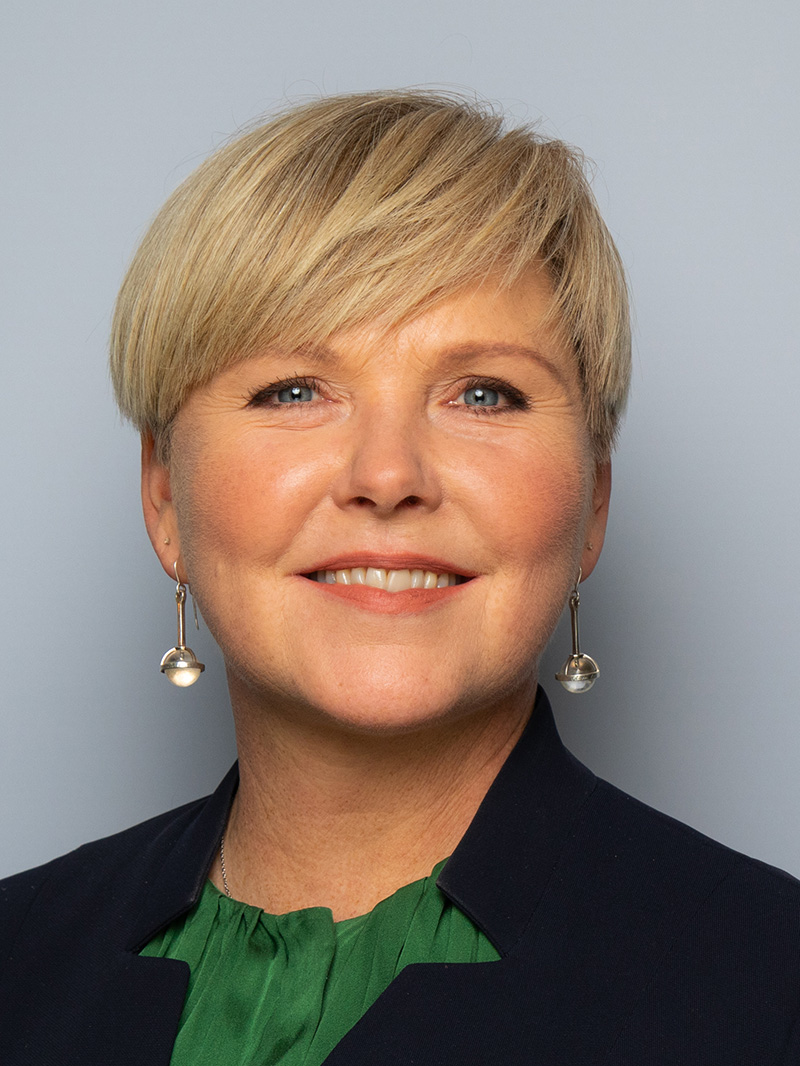

Minister of International Development
- In office 14 October 2021 – 4 February 2025
- Prime Minister: Jonas Gahr Støre
- Preceded by: Dag Inge Ulstein
- Succeeded by: Åsmund Grøver Aukrust

Minister of Nordic Cooperation
- In office 14 October 2021 – 4 February 2025
- Prime Minister: Jonas Gahr Støre
- Preceded by: Jan Tore Sanner

Second Deputy Leader of the Centre Party
- In office 7 April 2014 – 29 March 2025
- Leader: Trygve Slagsvold Vedum
- Preceded by: Trygve Slagsvold Vedum
- Succeeded by: Kjersti Toppe

State Secretary for the Ministry of Local Government and Regional Development
- In office 14 February 2011 – 16 October 2013; Acting: 14 February 2011 – 19 October 2012
- Prime Minister: Jens Stoltenberg
- Minister: Liv Signe Navarsete

Personal details
- Born: Anne Beathe Kristiansen; 22 May 1974 (age 52) Halden, Østfold, Norway
- Party: Centre
- Children: 2
- Occupation: Politician; Diplomat

Anne Beathe Kristiansen Tvinnereim (née Kristiansen, born 22 May 1974) is a Norwegian politician and diplomat who servied as the Minister of International Development and Minister of Nordic Cooperation from 2021 to 2025. A member of the Centre Party, she also served as the party's second deputy leader from 2014 to 2025.

== Career ==
Born in Halden on 22 May 1974, Tvinnereim has studied political science at the University of Costa Rica and the University of Oslo. From 1998 to 2000 she was member of the Centre Party's international committee and served as the leader. From 2000 to 2002 she was leader of the Centre Youth, and she was political advisor for the Centre Party's parliamentarians at the Storting from 2002 to 2005. She was assigned as second secretary at the Norwegian embassy in Maputo, Mozambique (2007–2011). From 2013 to 2014 she was senior advisor in the Norwegian Ministry of Foreign Affairs. The year after she joined the Norwegian Agency for Development Cooperation (Norad) as Deputy Director and served until 2018 when she joined the think tank Agenda where she stayed for a year. From 2019 to 2021 she was county commissioner for planning, climate and environment in Viken County. From 2006 to 2011 she was political adviser in the Ministry of Transport and Communications. She served as State Secretary in the Ministry of Local Government and Regional Development from February 2011 to October 2013. In 2014 she was elected second deputy leader of the Centre Party. She announced in February 2025 that she wouldn't seek re-election as deputy leader at the next party convention. She was succeeded by Kjersti Toppe.

=== Minister of International Development ===
On 14 October 2021, Tvinnereim was appointed minister of international development and minister of Nordic Cooperation in Støre's Cabinet.

==== Political priorities ====
In her role, Tvinnereim has prioritised fighting hunger and improving food self-sufficiency in developing countries as a top priority. In 2022, Norway launched its strategy: Combining forces against hunger – a policy to improve food self-sufficiency. While implementing the strategy, Norway has under Tvinnereim's leadership also joined the Alliance of Champions for Food Systems Transformation, hosted by CGIAR, as co-chair together with Brazil and Sierra Leone. The founding documents were signed during COP28. Norway is also co-chairing a task force on food system transformation as part of G20, where Norway is a guest country under the Brazilian presidency for 2024. In 2023, Norway launched its new action plan for international efforts to support women's rights and gender equality. The new plan includes a framework for incorporating gender equality as a priority in Norwegian foreign policy. In 2024, Norway will launch its new humanitarian strategy and new Africa strategy.

==== 2021 ====
When John-Arne Røttingen was elected to be one of the ten international members of the National Academy of Medicine, Tvinnereim issued her congratulations, saying: "It is nice to be able to congratulate Røttingen on this membership. We see that an important part of the solution to the global health challenges lies in international research collaboration. Norway has high confidence and the opportunity to act on complex global health issues. This appointment shows that we have the expertise it requires to continue the Norwegian commitment in global health and make a difference".

Tvinnereim and the government announced an increased priority for food safety and smaller farmers in the south in the development budget. Tvinnereim stated that the government wanted to prioritise the environment and food a lot more than the previous government, and that the fight against hunger was a number one priority.

On 9 December, Tvinnereim announced that Norway would enter an agreement with the World Food Programme to support locally produced school food in Ethiopia, Malawi and Niger. She went on to say: "Something as simple as a meal at school has countless ripple effects both for children's development and for local communities. We see that more people go to school when they get food. I'm very happy to sign the agreement with the World Food Program today. Norway contributes with 50 million NOK to school food programs in three countries, and to strengthen WFP's cooperation with the African Union on this important work".

On 16 December, a proposal to establish a new UNICEF office in Oslo was voted down in the Storting. Liberal Party leader Guri Melby criticised the government for removing help to "the most vulnerable of the vulnerable". Tvinnereim denied that there was a partisan issue, and stated that "the government reserves the right to adjust the instruments we use". She also said believed "it is a wrong use of development assistance funds to allocate half a billion kroner over ten years to manage a center in Oslo".

==== 2022 ====
At the annual Norad conference on 25 January 2022, Tvinnereim spoke critically of food safety. She announced that the government would spend the next year and a half to prioritise and work with said investment. She also emphasised how the issue effects smaller and poorer producers, and that she looked forward to enter dialog with civil society organisations and other actors about the issue for the next coming months.

During a parliamentary session in March, Tvinnereim announced that with the exception of 250 million NOK would be given to humanitarian aid in Ukraine, and these would not be taken from other humanitarian aids. She also assured that it would not hinder humanitarian aid to other parts of the world.

Ahead of the Our Ocean conference in April, Tvinnereim stressed the importance of maintaining healthy oceans for future generations: "The ocean is in crisis, and we must act now to ensure a healthy and productive sea. We are completely dependent on the sea for food, prosperity and jobs. The sea is a resource that must be managed in a sustainable way so that future generations can also benefit from it". She went on to talk about productive oceans, saying: "Healthy and productive oceans are fundamental to many communities around the world. And it is especially important in poor countries, and for small island states like Palau. Food from the sea is a crucial source of food security. Norway's efforts will contribute to ensuring good living conditions for communities living by and by the sea, and making them resistant to climate change".

On 24 June, Tvinnereim attended the international Uniting for Global Food Security conference in Berlin, Germany. She emphasised the importance of food security and Norway's efforts to combat the issue. Tvinnereim also thanked the host country for their inviative, while also expressing expectations for the G7 countries to take responsibility and action, and assured that Norway would follow up on the G7's proposals in the fight against world hunger.

On 12 September, Tvinnereim announced that Norway would be strengthening its global pandemic efforts. Among the measures would be a seed means financial mechanism that would assist with pandemic readiness. She stated: "After more than two years with a pandemic, Norway is embarking on a new initiative to strengthen the world's pandemic preparedness. This will reduce the risk and consequences of a new pandemic. The Covid-19 pandemic has shown the importance of strengthening global health preparedness, particularly in poor countries. If a virus is allowed to continue to develop in one country, it will threaten the health security of all of us".

In the wake of the government's state budget for 2023, Tvinnereim sat down with international aid organisations to hear their opinions on the cuts for international aid. Dagbladet later revealed that Tvinnereim was working to find other means of money then the state budget for international aid. According to Dagbladet, Tvinnereim was said to have become furious and tearful when it was revealed that the government was planning to remove billions of NOK from international aid in the 2023 state budget. In early August, she had been assured of the opposite by prime minister Støre, while during the budget conference on 31 August, no money was announced to be allocated to international aid.

Tvinnereim visited Somalia in early December, and also announced that Norway would spend 25 million NOK in development aid to help Somalia combat drought.

==== 2023 ====
During her attendance at the 59th Munich Security Conference in February 2023, Tvinnereim told media that "we should respect that the war in Ukraine looks different for other countries in the South", specifically referring to a military exercise conducted by South Africa and Russia. She also specified that contact with South African authorities would be maintained despite this.

On 20 June, Tvinnereim was appointed interim education minister on request from Tonje Brenna, who admitted to not being impartial in an appointment of a friend to Wergelandsenteret, who supplies funds to Utøya AS. In her interim capacity, she was charged with evaluating matters that Brenna deemed herself not impartial in handling. This included ruling that the friend's seat at the board for Wergelandsenteret was void.

In September, she and higher education minister Sandra Borch announced a new scholarship scheme for foreign students studying in Norway, who would have been affected by the government's implementation of tuition fees for foreign students from the EU and EEA countries.

In late October, Tvinnereim announced that the government would allocate an additional 40 million NOK to the existing 248 million NOK aid budget to humanitarian aid in the Sahel region of Africa.

In mid-December, she announced that the government would be increasing their support spending to Sudan by 60 million kroner. The money would go through the United Nations with the intent of combating sexual violence against children and refugees.

==== 2024 ====
In February, she met with former Sudanese prime minister Abdalla Hamdok during an African Union summit in Adis Abeba, Ethiopia. They discussed humanitarian aid and the humanitarian situation in Sudan and the possibility of a ceasefire in the country for the ongoing conflict.

In early March, Tvinnereim announced that the government would be moving the department responsible for evaluating international aid from Oslo to Førde. This was said to be a part of the government's aim to distribute more state levelled jobs to different parts of the country and she further sited that there had been desires for the department to not be subjected to the Norwegian Agency for Development Cooperation and be more independent from it. However, the move was criticised by employee organisations as being expensive and lacking in quality.

Later in March, she expressed concerns about the war in Sudan becoming a forgotten conflict and that it had ended up in the shadows of other global conflicts and called for it to receive better attention. She also expressed concerns about humanitarian aid into the country being weaponised against its population.

She visited Guatemala in June and met with President Bernardo Arévalo and organisations specialising in environmental issues, human rights and improved living standards for native populations. She also hailed the country as a "beacon of light in a world of democratic backsliding" and that Norway would continue to provide aid to the country.

Tvinnereim and foreign minister Espen Barth Eide announced in September that the government would be allocating 280 billion NOK to assist Palestine. 150 of these would be spent on supporting Palestinian institutions, health, energy, civil society and human rights, and the remaining 130 would be spent on supporting the humanitarian situation in the Gaza Strip.

Following the conclusion of negotiations for a plastic pollution treaty in Busan, South Korea in early December, Tvinnereim expressed disappointment over the fact that an agreement wasn't reached. She also described the negotiations as challenging, but also asserted that Norway would aim for an agreement to be made and continue to work with countries who share this objective.

==== 2025 ====
Following the Centre Party's withdrawel from government, she was succeeded by Åsmund Aukrust on 4 February 2025.

== Other activities ==
- World Bank, Ex-Officio Member of the Board of Governors (since 2021)

== Personal life ==
She is not married and has two children.

Government offices
Preceded by Dag Inge Ulstein	Minister of International Development; 2021–2025	Succeeded by Åsmund Grøver Aukrust
Preceded by Jan Tore Sanner	Minister of Nordic Cooperation; 2021–2025	Succeeded by TBD
Party political offices
Preceded by Trygve Slagsvold Vedum	Second Deputy Leader of the Centre Party; 2014–2025	Succeeded by Kjersti Toppe
