= Tom Kalsås =

Norwegian politician

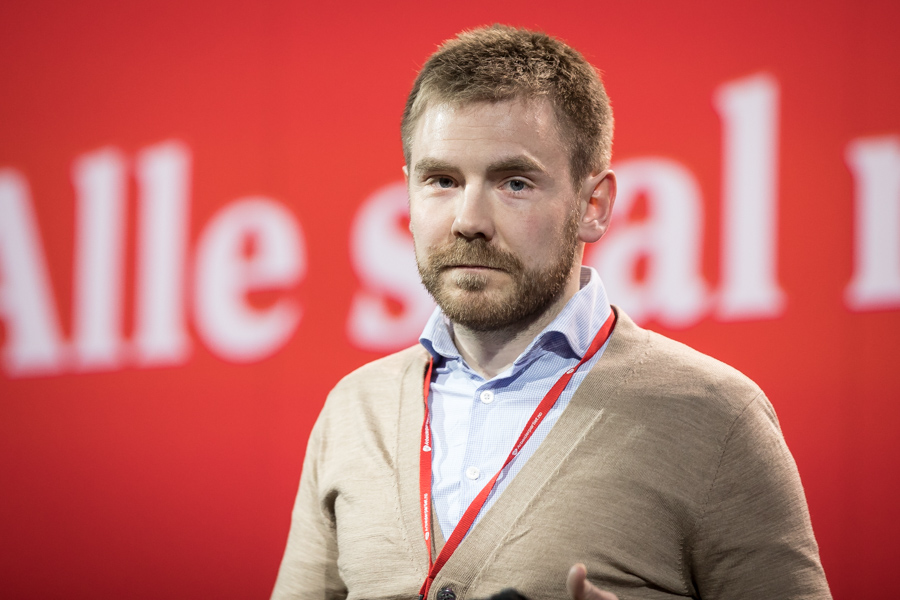
- Kalsås in 2017

State Secretary for the Ministry of Transport
- In office 4 November 2022 – 9 January 2026
- Prime Minister: Jonas Gahr Støre
- Minister: Jon-Ivar Nygård

Deputy Member of the Storting
- In office 1 October 2017 – 30 September 2025
- Deputising for: Hadia Tajik (2021–2022)
- Constituency: Rogaland

Personal details
- Born: 27 February 1986 (age 40)
- Party: Labour
- Education: University of Bergen
- Occupation: Jurist; Politician

Tom Kalsås (born 27 February 1986) is a Norwegian jurist and politician for the Labour Party. He served as a deputy member of the Storting for Rogaland from 2017 to 2025 and a State Secretary at the Ministry of Transport from 2022 to 2026.

== Early and personal life ==
Born on 27 February 1986, Kalsås graduated in jurisprudence from the University of Bergen in 2011. He was later assigned with tha law firm Haver.

== Political career ==
=== Local politics ===
Kalsås was elected to the Gjesdal municipal council in the 2007 local elections. Following the 2019 elections, he was elected to the Rogaland County Council and became his party's group leader.

In 2022, he became the Rogaland Labour Party's candidate for county mayor. However in November, he was appointed state secretary in the Støre Cabinet, forcing the county chapter to look for a new candidate.

=== Parliament ===
He was elected deputy representative to the Storting from the constituency of Rogaland for the periods 2017–2021 and 2021–2025, for the Labour Party. He deputised for Hadia Tajik in the Storting from 2021 to 2022 while Tajik was government minister.

=== State Secretary ===
On 4 November 2022, Kalsås was appointed state secretary at the Ministry of Transport.

In December, following criticism from citizens of Møre og Romsdal regarding cuts in ferry offers, Kalsås asserted that the government would be prioritising ferries going forwards and that 420 million NOK would be spent to reduce ferry prices in 2023.

In January 2023, it was revealed that an elderly woman had been found dead outside Oslo after a taxi had meant to deliver her to Lilleborg Health House. The death was one of many to have occurred since 2014, and Oslo University Hospital has since 2018 asked to transport their severely ill patients, but have always been rejected due to them requiring a taxi permit to do so. Kalsås reiterated this when asked about the case by NRK, saying: "There is a reason to look at where the boundaries should go, should there be more exceptions to the permit requirement".

He stepped down as state secretary on 9 January 2026.
