= Kjersti Toppe =

Norwegian politician

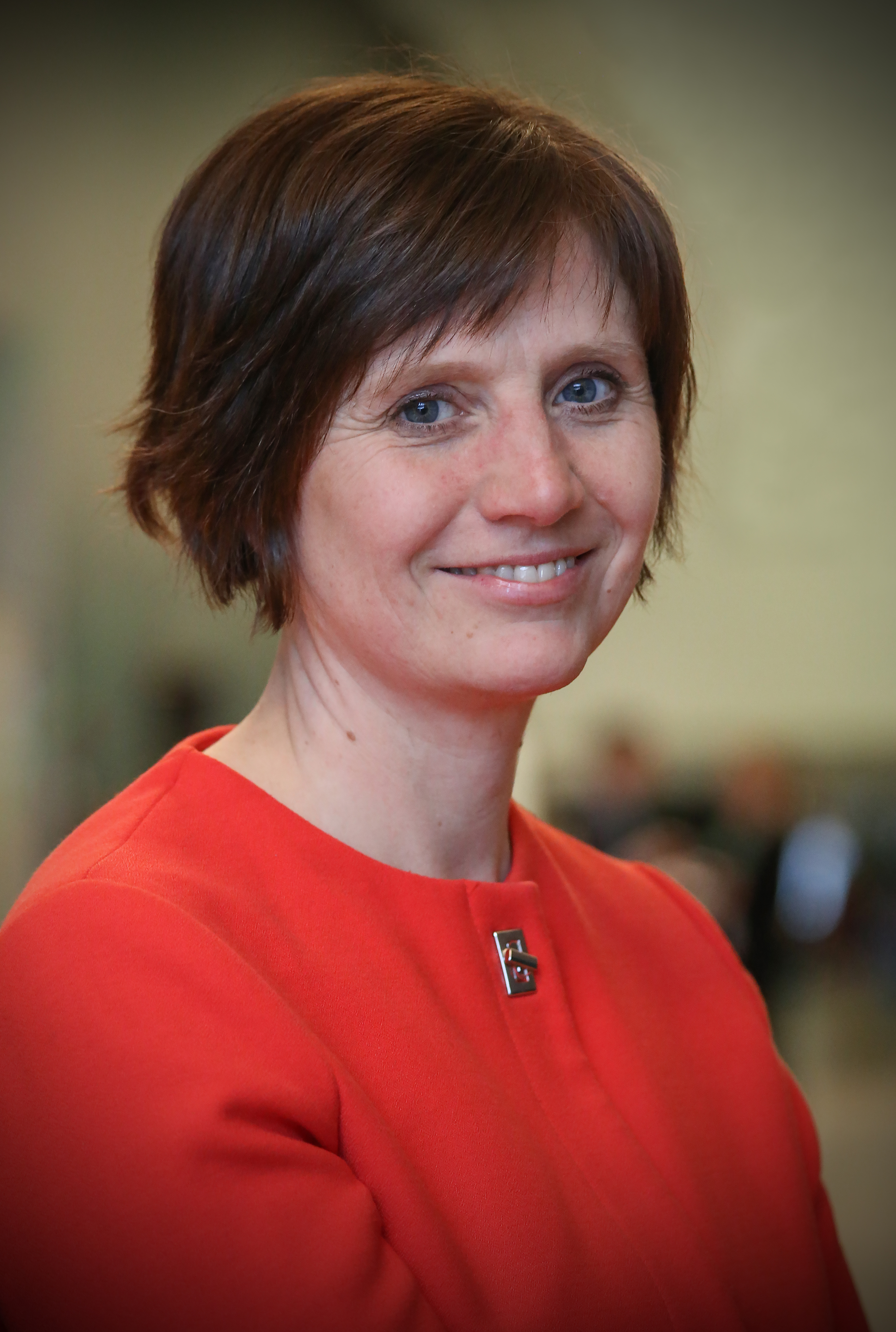

Second Deputy Leader of the Centre Party
- Incumbent
- Assumed office 29 March 2025
- Leader: Trygve Slagsvold Vedum
- Preceded by: Anne Beathe Tvinnereim

Minister of Children and Families
- In office 14 October 2021 – 4 February 2025
- Prime Minister: Jonas Gahr Støre
- Preceded by: Olaug Bollestad
- Succeeded by: Lene Vågslid

Member of the Storting
- Incumbent
- Assumed office 1 October 2009
- Deputy: Hans Inge Myrvold
- Constituency: Hordaland

Personal details
- Born: 20 October 1967 (age 58) Bergen, Hordaland, Norway
- Party: Centre
- Spouse: Erlend
- Children: 6
- Education: University of Bergen

Kjersti Toppe (born 20 October 1967) is a Norwegian physician and politician representing the Centre Party. She served as minister of children and families from 2021 to 2025, second deputy leader of the party since 2025 and a member of parliament from Hordaland since 2009.

== Political career ==
=== Parliament ===
Toppe was her party's top nominee for Hordaland in the 2009 election and was elected to the Storting in September. Prior to her election to parliament, Toppe served as the Centre Party's sole representative in the Bergen city council since 2001.

In parliament, Toppe was assigned to the position as first vice chair of the Standing Committee on Health and Care Services, a position she held between 2009 and 2021. During the 2009 election campaign, healthcare was her main issue, and she pledged to work against closure of rural hospitals. Toppe also served as the party's spokesperson for health policy.

Following her party's withdrawal from government, Toppe rejoined the Standing Committee on Health and Care Services.

=== Party politics ===
She was elected second deputy leader of the Centre Party at the 2025 convention, succeeding Anne Beathe Tvinnereim who had decided not to seek re-election.

=== Minister of Children and Families ===
Toppe was appointed minister of children and families on 14 October 2021 in the Støre Cabinet.

==== 2021 ====
Following revelations that the Norwegian System of Patient Injury Compensation had not met with people who demanded compensation for injuries, Toppe expressed surprise of the compensation's actions, and said that she had at least expected them to meet with the people in question. She did not rule out that their methods could revolve around income or people's finances. She further that there will be a full review of the compensation's methods and did not rule out that it should be changed.

A father filed a complaint to the Norwegian Parliamentary Ombud regarding his loss of 67 days of his paid paternity leave because he had applied after the Norwegian Labour and Welfare Administration's deadline. His complaint expressed that NAV had no legal authority to deprive him of the money. The ombudsman supported him, but despite this, NAV didn't comply. Toppe expressed support for NAV's judicial evaluation, commenting that the case was complicated. She further stated that the ombudsman had reached a different conclusion then NAV and the Social Security Court, and that the ministry would stand behind NAV's conclusion.

More than 13 cases against Norway were brought up by the European Court of Human Rights regarding child neglect and breaches of human rights from the Norwegian Child Welfare Services. On 26 November, Toppe expressed understanding. She further remarked that the breaches of human rights were serious and unacceptable. She also stressed that it was her responsibility to make sure that the Child Welfare Services upheld human rights obligations.

On 7 December, in a Teams meeting with the Norwegian Union of Social Educators and Social Workers, Toppe promised to have a look at turnover and incitement against Child Welfare Service workers. She notably said: "I want to highlight the work you do and work to ensure that you feel safe and well at work".

After VG had been denied insight to documents from the Norwegian Child Welfare Services due to concerns to maintain their reputation; Toppe expressed concern that it could cause distrust in the Child Welfare Services. She also said that the Services behaved "too locked", and also cited that concerns for reputation had never been used as an argument before. She also mentioned that the Services should be more transparent and open to the public and provide more insight.

==== 2022 ====
With a crisis help centre in Karasjok Municipality closed down in 2019, criticism has been pointed to the municipality for not having taken proper action to come with a better alternative. Toppe added to this criticism in early March 2022, saying it was "unfortunate" for the municipality to send their own citizens to the nearby town of Hammerfest.

On 24 March, Toppe expressed that the government should consider three-part leave, having reservations about the scheme actually benefiting families with children and their needs. Her concerns notably stemmed from the fact that many women now take a longer period of leave without pay and pensionable income.

In the wake of revelations by Aftenposten showing that mentally ill children were not receiving necessary care and treatment by children's welfare services, Toppe demanded an investigation into the matter, saying: "We must get an overview of the number of children in child welfare with serious mental illness. We need to know what we are doing with these children today and map out whether the regions believe there is failure around them".

On 16 June, Toppe unveiled the first ever logo marker notifying of changes to a person's appearance in advertisements. Norway is also the first country to utilise such a logo. A proposal for such a logo was first put forward in 2021, before now coming into effect.

On 20 June, Toppe received backlash due to her stance on surrogacy and the affects it has on society. She compared it to human trafficking, expressed concerns for children to become orphans and that it should be punishable. She later emphasised that it was only her personal opinion, and not the government's policy. Her fellow minister, Anette Trettebergstuen, expressed disagreement with her, a sentiment also shared by Grunde Almeland of the Liberal Party and chair of the Standing Committee on Family and Cultural Affairs.

In August, after the Ombudsman for Children expressed that children between 15 and 18 should be able to consent to doping tests on their own accord, Toppe later confirmed that her ministry would be looking into the issue. However, she did state that 15 to 18 year olds should have consent competence before consenting to a doping test. She also remarked that the responsibility for changing doping test rules would fall under the Ministry of Culture.

On 5 September, Toppe issued an apology to parents who had been wrongly reported by schools to the Child Welfare Services and called it "what they've been through, was a massive mistake".

On 30 September, Toppe revealed that 96 million NOK of the 2023 state budget would be used to invest in activities for children who require help to partake in activities.

In October, Toppe called for child welfare services activist Rune Fardal to delete videos of vulnerable children on the internet. She also called for him to not repeat his offences, but also admitted that his activism was a response to a poor maintained child welfare service. Fardal himself said that he has released the videos of the children with their parents' permission had yet to receive any calls for him to remove any of them.

On 25 October, she expressed that angry consumers and branch norms could assist retail shop companies in the fight against shrink inflation. She also confirmed that the government hadn't looked on the issue yet.

As the government's budget negotiations with the Socialist Left Party commenced in November, opposition parties, the Red Party and the Christian Democrats criticised the government for not increasing the child benefits like other measures to counter the rise in prices. Toppe agreed with their sentiment, but argued that the government had already put important measures for children's interests, including in the new state budget.

On 16 November, Toppe announced that the government would launch an investigation into reports of foreign adoptions that were illegal. More specifically, the investigation would look into the adoption system. Toppe herself expressed that there was no suspicion of any adoptions being illegal.

==== 2023 ====
In January 2023, Toppe expressed concerns for the low birth rate numbers in the country, and that the government was particularly concerned about the developments in the districts. On another hand, she did however praise the improvements of parental allowances for both students and other women who hasn't been allowed parental allowance.

Following controversy regarding MyGame filming and streaming of child sports, Toppe expressed that the age restriction should be put at age 18 for said sports. She also expressed that there should be strict obligations of consent, while also pointing out that some children would be vulnerable in such a position.

In the wake of revelations of multiple illegal child adoptions from South Korea by Verdens Gang, Toppe did not rule out the possibility of illegal child adoptions from South Korea could be widespread. Toppe also vowed that the manner would be investigated thoroughly.

In June, Toppe issued an apology to the families whose lives were affected by the child welfare services breaching human rights in 15 cases.

Despite the government originally planning to phase out public participants from the child welfare services, in July, Toppe called on them to assist in increasing the capacity for child welfare institutions, which she remarked would only be in the short term.

In September, Toppe announced that foster parents would be granted the right of complaint for framework conditions after the Foster Care Deal had been reviewed again by the Ministry of Children and Families.

In November, Toppe opened up for increasing the age of responsibility for refugee children between 15 and 18 to fall under the jurisdiction of the child welfare services.

In December, the government announced that they would crack down on Russ celebrations. Toppe announced that the government would increase supervision of the Russ' supply branch, which notably supplies them with buses, clothing and other equipment. She also encouraged parents to be vigilant when it came to the youths' rights counter the pressure they would be up against.

==== 2024 ====
Verdens Gang unearthed that Norway at least received 88 notifications about illegal child adoptions since the 1970s in January. Toppe had previously stated that authorities had received no indication of this, but now admitted that there has been a mistake and that the government should have acted sooner. Furthermore, at least 2 of the 88 notifications were sent to her directly.

In March, both Toppe and education minister Kari Nessa Nordtun met with Russ service providers to discuss their role in affecting students. Toppe highlighted that they had put weight behind exclusion and degeneration, and how these factors affect school performance and test results.

Since the Støre government assumed office in 2021, they have actively worked to phase out private actors in the child services sector. This has however lead to children under 18 in crisis situations being placed in temporary institutions such as prisons and hotel rooms in lack of adequate commercial institutional capacity. The opposition, notably the Conservative and Progress parties, criticised the government in July for "symbol policies" affecting children's wellbeing. Toppe defended the government's decision, noting that they will continue to place crisis ridden children in temporary care at other institutions until commercial ones can be sorted.

Health minister Jan Christian Vestre presented the government's new abortion law in August, which would seek to extend the period from 12 to 18 weeks. As her party was opposed to this change, Toppe encouraged Centre Party representatives to vote against the law when its brought forward to the Storting for a vote.

In September, in response to a court case where a family had brought the child welfare services to court to be reunited with their children; Toppe expressed that "poor evaluations in the child welfare service" could have irreparable damage if a reunification process progressed too slowly. She also emphasised the importance of the child welfare services' responsibility to make proper evaluations and ensure the legal security for both children and their families. Furthermore, she noted that the services lack transparency and that it needs to be improved.

In early December, Toppe put forward several proposals to combat sexual assault in child welfare institutions, which includes strengthened rules about child supervision, mandatory police certificates for foreign workers and strengthened background checks. She also cited previous measures she has implemented on the issue, but conceded that more could be done.

==== 2025 ====
In January, Toppe received the report from a commission set down in 2023 to investigate potential illegal adoptions from Colombia and Ecuador. In the former case, the commission concluded that Colombian mothers may have been forced to give up their children for adoptions and suspicious payments having been made to private children's homes being problematic. In the latter case, the commission concluded that could have been errors in adoptions from a children's home, while also criticising Norwegian authorities for not taking action after a contact person was arrested in connection to 13 possible adoptions. Toppe conceded that the Norwegian system "hasn't been safe and secure enough".

Following the Centre Party's withdrawel from government, she was succeeded by former Lene Vågslid on 4 February 2025.

== Personal life ==
Apart from politics, Toppe is a medical doctor, and has worked at the emergency room in Bergen. She quit this job during her fifth pregnancy, and now has six children with her husband Erlend.

Political offices
Preceded by Trygve Slagsvold Vedum	First Vice Chair of the Standing Committee on Health and Care Services; 2009–2021	Succeeded by Cecilie Myrseth
Preceded by Olaug Bollestad	Minister of Children and Families; 2021–2025	Succeeded by Lene Vågslid
