= Stine Renate Håheim =

Norwegian politician

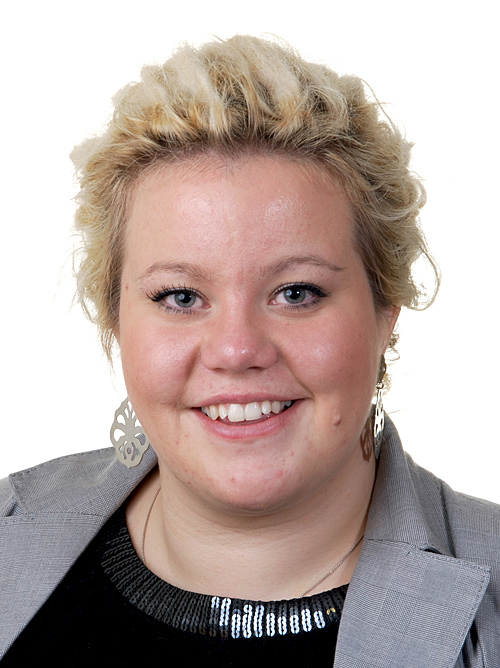

Member of the Storting
- Incumbent
- Assumed office 20 October 2009

Personal details
- Born: 13 May 1984 (age 41) Oslo
- Party: Labour Party
- Committees: Justice Committee
- Website: http://stinerenate.no

Stine Renate Håheim (born 13 May 1984) is a Norwegian politician (representing the Labour Party).

== Background ==
She is from Valdres in Oppland county. Håheim studied at the Lektorstudiet at Universitetet i Oslo, a professional course based around teaching studies.

On 22 July 2011 she escaped unharmed from the Utøya shooting massacre.

== Political career ==
She served on the municipal council for Nord-Aurdal Municipality from 2003–2007, and a member of Oppland county council between 2007 and 2009. Håheim was a central member of Arbeidernes ungdomsfylking (Workers' Youth League or AUF) from 2006 to 2010.

At the 2009 Norwegian parliamentary election, she was the party's 4th candidate for Oppland, and from October 2009, she replaced Rigmor Aasrud, as Aasrud become the Minister of Government Administration and Church Affairs, and had to leave her seat in the Storting (Parliament).

In 2020 she was one of the signatories of the "Call for Inclusive Feminism," a document which led to the establishment of the Initiative for Inclusive Feminism.

== Origin of quote on CNN ==
Helle Gannestad
(@Uhellet)
tweeted:

Norwegian:

Når en mann kan forårsake så mye ondt - tenk hvor mye kjærlighet vi kan skape sammen.

Translation:

When one man could cause so much evil - think about how much love we can create together.

23 Jul 2011

She was interviewed by CNN's Richard Quest on 23 July 2011 where she phrased the words "If one man can create that much hate, you can only imagine how much love we as a togetherness can create." This phrase was later quoted by prime minister Jens Stoltenberg during the memorial service on Sunday 24 July 2011, attributed to "the AUF girl who was interviewed by CNN", slightly rephrased due to translation back in Norwegian (here in English translation): If one man can show so much hate, think how much love we could show together.

According to Håheim herself in an interview with the Norwegian newspaper Verdens Gang she attributes the original formulation to a good friend, Helle Gannestad.

Verdens Gang later updated the article The Love Message is Spreading in All Channels on 25 July 2011 with the information that the Love Quote correctly shall be attributed to Helle Gannestad, the good friend of Håheim. The original phrasing in English translation is as follows: When one man could cause so much evil - think about how much love we can create together.

== Storting committees ==
- 2009–2013 member of Justice Committee
