= Kamzy Gunaratnam =

Norwegian politician (born 1988)

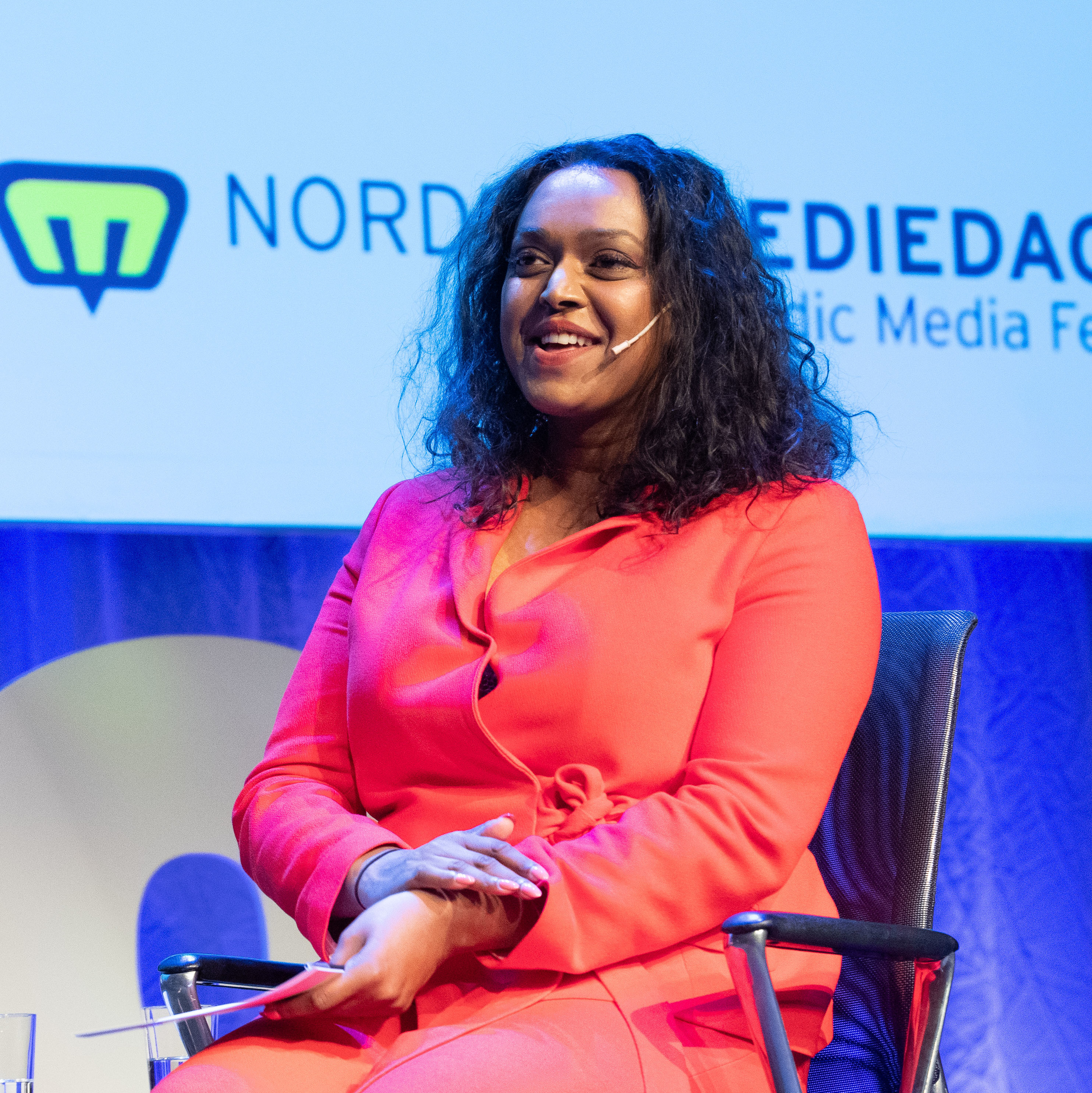
- Gunaratnam in 2019

Minister of Transport
- Incumbent
- Assumed office 11 September 2026
- Prime Minister: Jonas Gahr Støre
- Preceded by: Jon-Ivar Nygård

Member of the Storting
- Incumbent
- Assumed office 1 October 2021
- Deputy: Farukh Qureshi
- Constituency: Oslo

Deputy Mayor of Oslo
- In office 21 October 2015 – 20 October 2021
- Mayor: Marianne Borgen
- Preceded by: Libe Rieber-Mohn
- Succeeded by: Abdullah Alsabeehg

Personal details
- Born: Khamshajiny Gunaratnam; 27 March 1988 (age 38) Jaffna, Sri Lanka
- Citizenship: Norway
- Party: Labour
- Spouse: David Aas Correia (m. 2023)

Kamzy Gunaratnam (born Khamshajiny Gunaratnam, Tamil: கம்சாயினி குணரத்தினம் (Kamcāyiņi Kuṇarattiņam) in Jaffna, Sri Lanka on 27 March 1988) is a Norwegian politician for the Labour Party. She has served as the Minister of Transport since 2026 and previously served as Oslo’s deputy mayor from 2015 to 2021. Gunaratnam was nominated in second place on the Labour Party's general election list for Oslo, in the 2021 parliamentary elections for the Storting, which she won.

== Politics ==
Gunaratnam was elected as a representative to Oslo City Council for the first time in 2007, she was a deputy member of the Storting (2013–2017) and took office as the deputy mayor of Oslo on 21 October 2015. She is a member of the Labour Party, who represent a progressive, social democratic political approach. In Workers' Youth League (AUF) she has had both local and central key positions and has been editor of the nationwide membership magazine, Praksis

During an interview with Guardian journalist Lauren Razavi two months after she was elected, Gunaratnam described her political approach: "The only way we can move society forward is by disagreeing, discussing and coming up with new solutions to the problem we're facing. We need as many people as possible to be involved to realise the best solutions for our city and our country. In 10 or even 100 years, we have to be able to look at ourselves in the mirror and tell our children and grandchildren that we took these decisions and we're proud to have done what we've done."

Gunaratnam is known for her work promoting ethnic, political and religious diversity. She is an advocate against online hate speech online hate speech, which she also has been exposed to herself.

On 18 March 2023, she announced that she was resigning from her position in the Oslo Labour Party during the party's annual meeting. She cited a need for renewal within the leadership. At the same she expressed dissatisfaction with the leadership being predominantly white, using the term "blendahvit", which many regard as a racial slur, when describing the leadership.

=== Minister of Transport ===
In September 2026, she was appointed Minister of Transport in Jonas Gahr Støre's government.

==== Tenure ====
During her visit to Kristiansand in November, Gunaratnam responded to calls for government intervention on road tolls for the newly completed stretch of European route E39, stating that the governemnt did not plan to intervene and that motorways were under the counties' responsibility. County Mayor Arne Thomassen argues her resposne was incomprehensible and that the county had done what they were meant to, further asking if "the county should pay for the roads".

== Response to European refugee crisis ==
Speaking to Guardian journalist Lauren Razavi in December 2015, Gunaratnam said: "I believe every country should take their responsibility. There was a time when Norwegian people flew over the Atlantic to the United States because of the situation in Norway. Today people see Norway as a great place to be, and we should feel honoured by that."

== Background ==
Gunaratnam was born in Sri Lanka and came to Norway as a refugee when she was three years old. Her parents were Tamil refugees who worked in the fishing industry in the north of Norway, though they relocated to Oslo a few years after arriving in the country so that Gunaratnam and her brother could go to a Tamil school.

After joining the Tamil Youth Organisation in Oslo, Gunaratnam met governing mayor Raymond Johansen who encouraged her to get involved with politics, which she did. She was subsequently banned from returning to Sri Lanka as a result of her engagement with politics in Norway. She later studied social geography at the University of Oslo. She officially took over the first name Kamzy in October 2018, a name she has for long been known as in Norway.

=== 2011 Norway attacks ===
On 22 July 2011, when Gunaratnam was aged 23, she attended a Workers' Youth League Camp on the island of Utøya, where Anders Behring Breivik committed a massacre that killed 69 people. Gunaratnam swam 500 metres across the Tyrifjorden Lake to survive as bullets struck the water around her. Breivik was later, as one of the many charges, found guilty and sentenced for her attempted murder.
