= Geir Pollestad =

Norwegian politician

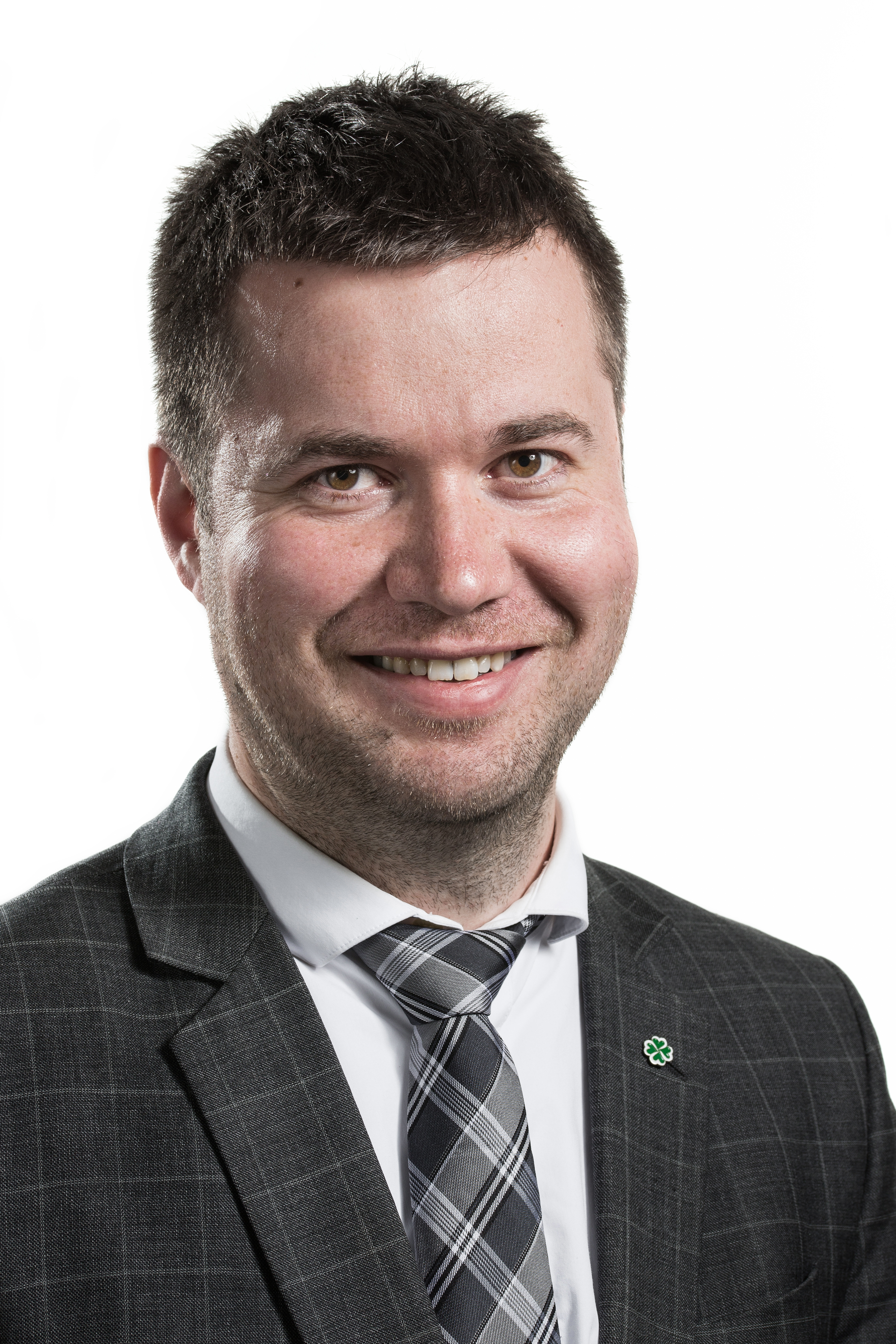

Minister of Agriculture and Food
- In office 4 August 2023 – 4 February 2025
- Prime Minister: Jonas Gahr Støre
- Preceded by: Sandra Borch
- Succeeded by: Nils Kristen Sandtrøen

Member of the Storting
- Incumbent
- Assumed office 1 October 2013
- Deputy: Tor Inge Eidesen
- Constituency: Rogaland

State Secretary at the Ministry of Transport
- In office 28 September 2012 – 30 September 2013
- Prime Minister: Jens Stoltenberg
- Minister: Marit Arnstad
- In office 8 October 2008 – 30 September 2009
- Prime Minister: Jens Stoltenberg
- Minister: Liv Signe Navarsete

State Secretary at the Ministry of Petroleum and Energy
- In office 20 June 2008 – 8 October 2008
- Prime Minister: Jens Stoltenberg
- Minister: Terje Riis-Johansen

Personal details
- Born: 13 August 1978 (age 48) Hå Municipality, Rogaland, Norway
- Party: Centre
- Spouse: Lene Mo
- Children: 3
- Education: University of Bergen
- Occupation: Solicitor; Politician

Geir Pollestad (born 13 August 1978) is a Norwegian solicitor and politician for the Centre Party. He served as the minister of agriculture and food from 2023 to 2025, and has been a member of parliament for Rogaland since 2013.

== Early life and education ==
Pollestad was born in Høyland in Hå Municipality, to Jone Pollestad and Marit Erga, both self-employed workers with a family company. He has at least two brothers.

Pollestad took lower secondary education in Nærbø and upper secondary education in Bryne, finishing in 1997. After one year at Stavanger University College he enrolled in law studies at the University of Bergen, graduating with the cand.jur. degree in 2006. During his last year of studying he was a board member of the Student Welfare Organisation in Bergen. After graduation, he worked one year as a junior solicitor in the law firm Projure Advokatfirma.

== Personal life ==
Pollestad is married to Lene Pollestad (née Mo), with whom he has three children: two sons and one daughter.

== Political career ==
=== Early career ===
Pollestad was the political deputy leader of the Centre Youth from 2001 to 2003, and vice president of Nordiska Centerungdomens Förbund from 2003 to 2009.

=== Parliament ===
He served as a deputy representative to the Storting from Rogaland from 2001 to 2005, then from Hordaland from 2005 to 2009 and again from Rogaland from 2009 to 2013.

He resigned as state secretary in October 2013, as he won a regular seat in Parliament in the 2013 general election. He has won re-election since. In parliament, he was a member of the Standing Committee on Energy and the Environment from 2013 to 2014, when he transferred to the Standing Committee on Business and Industry, where he also became leader until 2021.

Despite media reports stating that Pollestad was a relevant candidate for minister of agriculture or minister of trade and industry in the new government following the 2021 election, Pollestad was eventually not chosen to become a minister. Instead, he was elected the party's deputy parliamentary leader.

After Sigbjørn Gjelsvik was appointed minister of local government, Pollestad became his successor as the party's financial spokesperson on 27 April 2022. He left the position when he was appointed minister in 2023 and was succeeded by Ole André Myhrvold. As parliamentary deputy leader, he was succeeded by Gro-Anita Mykjåland.

On 31 January 2023, he became acting chair of the Standing Committee on Finance and Economic Affairs during Eigil Knutsen's leave.

Following his party's withdrawal from government, Pollestad again became deputy parliamentary leader and also joined the Standing Committee on Finance and Economic Affairs.

=== Stoltenberg's cabinet ===
In 2007, during the reign of Stoltenberg's Second Cabinet, Pollestad was appointed political advisor in the Ministry of Local Government and Regional Development. In late 2007 he changed to the Ministry of Petroleum and Energy. In 2008, he was promoted to State Secretary in the same ministry. He served until October 2009, when he returned to Parliament, where he was a regular representative while Magnhild Meltveit Kleppa served in cabinet (until June 2012). In September 2012 he returned as State Secretary, this time in the Ministry of Transport and Communications.

=== Minister of Agriculture and Food ===
Pollestad was appointed minister of agriculture and food on 4 August 2023 when Sandra Borch was appointed minister of research and higher education following Ola Borten Moe's resignation.

==== 2023 ====
Shortly after assuming office, Pollestad and finance minister Trygve Slagsvold Vedum announced that the government would re-establish emergency storage facilities for grain, marking the first time in over 20 years the country would be doing so.

In November, both the Green Party and Conservative Party criticised Pollestad for his family owning stocks in the country's second largest hatchery, which would cause a conflict of interest and casting doubt over his impartiality. Pollestad later confirmed that the Ministry of Justice and Public Security's legal department would look into whether or not he would be considered non-impartial on delicate issues. The legal department later concluded that Pollestad generally was impartial, but not impartial in matters regarding Hå Rugeri.

In December, he announced that the government would move forward with cutting costs to competitors of Tine by 50 million kroner. He argued that the redistribution was to aid the agricultural sector and secure better quality for them around the country. The proposal was sent out on hearing that summer by his predecessor, and was controversial within the dairy community, while the Norwegian Competition Authority notably argued that it would contribute to more inequality in the dairy structures and differences in shipping costs.

==== 2024 ====
In January, he argued that two years of classroom classes and two years of work experience would be a flexible scheme for the agricultural line in upper secondary schools. He did however reason that such a scheme should be an alternative to the present one, which requires two years of regular classes and one year of work experience for completion. His comments came after the Norwegian Directorate for Education and Training had proposed mending the educational run for farmers in order to give the sector a boost.

The following month he received criticism from fellow cabinet member Andreas Bjelland Eriksen about destroying nature in favour of big projects. Pollestad had originally claimed it was a good thing in order to improve infrastructure and society, while Eriksen countered that Pollestad's claim didn't represent the government's plans for preserving nature. Pollestad later argued that what affects nature would also fall under his field of responsibility, but that his and Eriksen's tasks would still differ.

Pollestad presented the state and farmers' organisations' reached settlement for the 2024 agricultural settlement on 16 May, which would provide farmers with a framework of 3.015 million NOK. He praised the agreement and the commitment shown in order to reach the deal "in uncertain times regarding agricultural policy".

The animals' rights group NOAH filed a complaint against Pollestad in October 2023 accusing him of violating impartiality in the chicken farming industry and against animal rights. They furthermore accused of being personally engaged in weakening the organisation. In September 2024, the legal department at the Ministry of Justice and Public Security concluded that Pollestad was impartial, reasoning that "a slight personal reluctance is not considered sufficient". They also cited that a comment Pollestad made in a 2018 podcast, isolated could be "perceived as having a somewhat unfair character" against the organisation.

The Red Party asked Pollestad in October about the import of dough from overseas. Pollestad argued that he could not put focus on local made dough, blaming the EEA agreement preventing him from increasing tolls on foreign products. Furthermore, that the food grain subsidy, which is given to companies that use Norwegian produced grain in production, helps to equalize raw material costs between the domestic baking industry and foreign competitors.

==== 2025 ====
The government, with the support of the Liberal Party, Christian Democrats and Patient Focus, secured a majority in parliament in February to approve the political premises of the numerical basis for the 2024 agricultural settlement. The agreement notably outlined a reduction of man-years from 2027 with a calculated 1700 hours per man-years. Furthermore, the agreement also included a target of 10% ecological agricultural land by 2032. Pollestad praised the agreement and emphasised the importance of reaching it in relation to increasing income opportunities and other achievement of goals in agricultural policy.

Following the Centre Party's withdrawal from government, he was succeeded by Nils Kristen Sandtrøen on 4 February 2025.

Political offices
Preceded by Sandra Borch	Minister of Agriculture and Food; 2023–2025	Succeeded by Nils Kristen Sandtrøen
Preceded by Marit Arnstad	Chair of the Standing Committee on Business and Industry; 2014–2021	Succeeded by Willfred Nordlund
Party political offices
Preceded by Sigbjørn Gjelsvik	Centre Party Financial Spokesperson; 2022–2023	Succeeded by Ole André Myhrvold
Preceded by N/A	Deputy Parliamentary Leader of the Centre Party; 2021–2023	Succeeded by Gro-Anita Mykjåland
