= Marit Arnstad =

Norwegian lawyer and politician

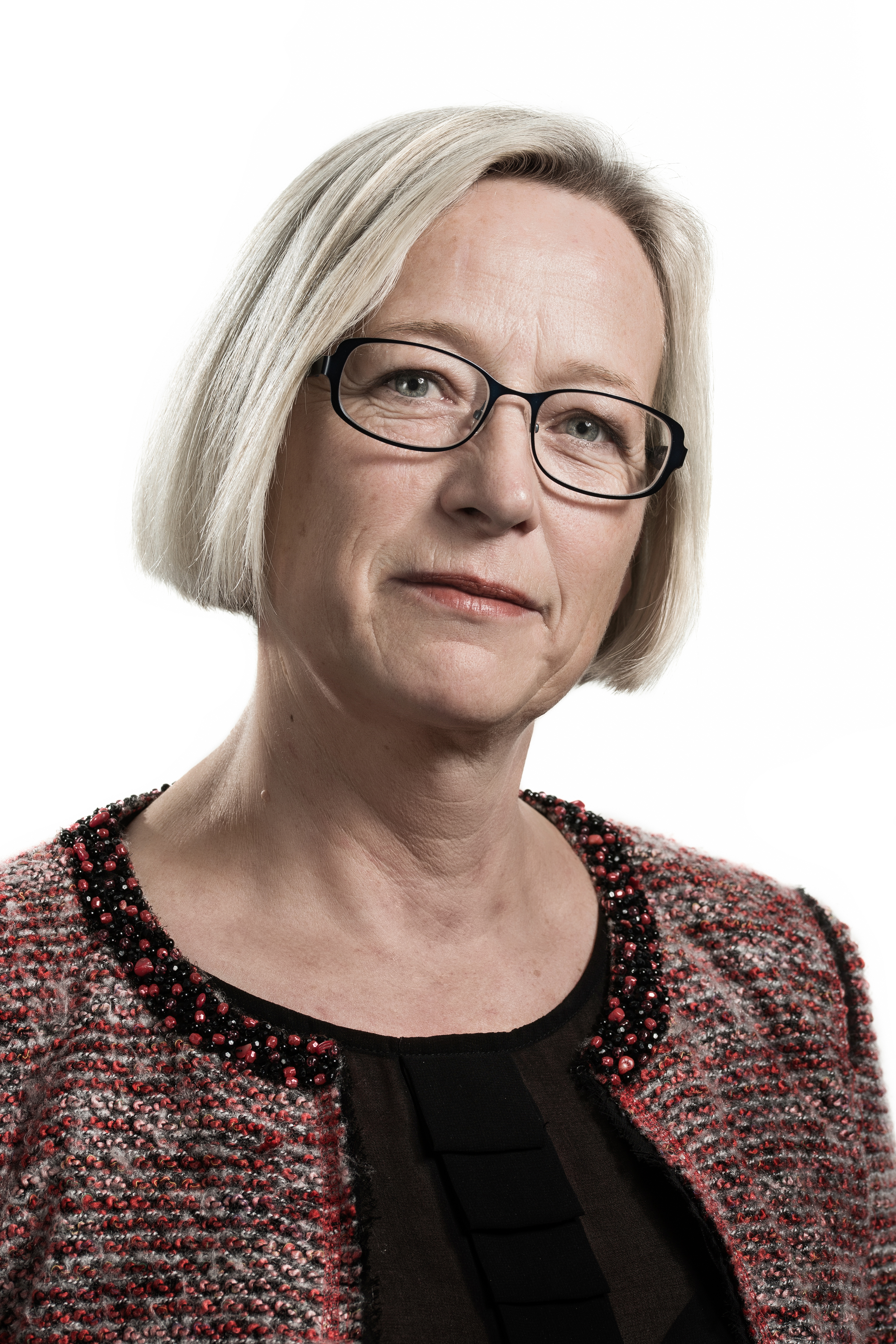

Minister of Transport and Communications
- In office 18 June 2012 – 16 October 2013
- Prime Minister: Jens Stoltenberg
- Preceded by: Magnhild Meltveit Kleppa
- Succeeded by: Ketil Solvik-Olsen

Minister of Petroleum and Energy
- In office 17 October 1997 – 17 March 2000
- Prime Minister: Kjell Magne Bondevik
- Preceded by: Ranveig Frøiland
- Succeeded by: Olav Akselsen

Parliamentary Leader of the Centre Party
- In office 9 April 2014 – 1 October 2025
- Deputy: Geir Pollestad; Gro-Anita Mykjåland
- Leader: Trygve Slagsvold Vedum
- Preceded by: Liv Signe Navarsete
- Succeeded by: Trygve Slagsvold Vedum
- In office 25 March 2003 – 30 September 2005
- Leader: Åslaug Haga
- Preceded by: Odd Roger Enoksen
- Succeeded by: Magnhild Meltveit Kleppa

Member of the Norwegian Parliament
- In office 1 October 2013 – 30 September 2025
- Deputy: Bjørn Arild Gram (2013)
- Constituency: Nord-Trøndelag
- In office 1 October 2001 – 30 September 2005
- Constituency: Nord-Trøndelag
- In office 1 October 1993 – 30 September 1997
- Constituency: Nord-Trøndelag

Personal details
- Born: 4 May 1962 (age 63) Skatval, Nord-Trøndelag, Norway
- Party: Centre
- Children: 1

Marit Arnstad (born 4 May 1962) is a Norwegian lawyer and politician for the Centre Party. She served as the party's parliamentary leader from 2014 to 2025, having previously held the office from 2003 to 2005. Arnstad was the Norwegian Minister of Transport from 2012 to 2013 and Minister of Petroleum and Energy from 1997 to 2000.

== Early and personal life ==
Arnstad was born in Stjørdal Municipality, and is the daughter of tax assessor and farmer Arne Arnstad and nurse Aasta Auran, and twin sister of Eli Arnstad. She is also the sister-in-law of Iwar Arnstad, and cousin of Ellen Arnstad. The Arnstad family from Arnstad vestre at Skatval has fostered several Centre Party politicians since the interwar period. She held various jobs and offices before entering politics on a national level in 1993.

She also has a son, August Arnstad (born 1999).

== Political career ==
=== Parliament ===
In 1993, she was elected to the Storting and sat as a representative for the Centre Party until 1997. In 2001 she was once again elected to the Storting, where she sat until 2005. She reasoned that she wanted to seek a job outside of politics and focus her attention on raising her son.

She was nominated at the top spot on the Centre Party ballot in Nord-Trøndelag for the 2013 election, which is considered a safe seat. She was preferred for the top spot over Lars Peder Brekk who had the position in 2005. She chaired the Standing Committee on Business and Industry between 2013 and 2014, when she stepped down to become the party's parliamentary leader for a second time. She has also been mentioned as a possible future leader of the Centre Party.

In May 2024, she announced that she wouldn't seek re-election at the 2025 election.

=== Party politics ===
Within the Centre Party, she notably served as its parliamentary leader from 2003 to 2005. She was re-elected to said position again in 2014 when Trygve Slagsvold Vedum became party leader.

Following the 2021 election, she joined party leader Trygve Slagsvold Vedum with pre-government negotiations in Hurdal Municipality that began on 23 September.

When the Centre Party withdrew from government on 30 January 2025, Arnstad confirmed that they would continue to support Jonas Gahr Støre as prime minister.

=== Government minister ===
Arnstad served as minister of petroleum and energy from 1997 to 2000 under Kjell Magne Bondevik. She later served as minister of transport from 2012 to 2013 under Jens Stoltenberg.

After the election of 2005, she was mentioned by many as a possible minister in the new government that included the Centre Party, but Arnstad did not become a minister at that time.

Following the 2021 election, she was mentioned as a strong favorite to become minister of finance.

==== Minister of Petroleum and Energy ====
Following the 1997 election, she took a seat in Kjell Magne Bondevik's first Cabinet as Minister of Petroleum and Energy on 17 October 1997.

Arnstad took parental leave in 1999 as her son was born. During this time, Anne Enger Lahnstein was acting minister.

She left the post on 17 March 2000 when the government resigned over the issue of gas power stations, and was succeeded by Olav Akselsen.

==== Minister of Transport and Communications ====
Following a cabinet reshuffle on 18 June 2012, Arnstad was appointed Minister of Transport in Stoltenberg's Second Cabinet.

In August 2012, Arnstad expressed concerns over a new practise that was used at the border between Norway and Sweden, where truck drivers had been stopped and told that there trucks couldn't carry more than 40 tons. She wrote to the Swedish Minister for Infrastructure Catharina Elmsäter-Svärd with these concerns. Elmsäter-Svärd stressed the importance of continued transport over the border, but didn't comment on the case Arnstad was referring to.

In October, Arnstad expressed that the new Follo rail line would be a demanding project after the cost of it increased to 23,5 billion NOK. In addition she believed that the costs wouldn't surpass 23,5 billion NOK, and added that it shouldn't sink below it either. She further expressed confidence that the line would eventually be built.

In December, Arnstad expressed that high-speed rail was not a priority, saying that other tasks within transportation was more important. She did however support the importance of railway transport.

In February 2013, Arnstad sent a letter to the Norwegian Public Roads Administration to change the definition of mopeds in the law regarding motorcycles and mopeds, to include bikes with start-up engines, thereby making them legal. Arnstad took this action after VG reported that the Norwegian Labour and Welfare Administration (NAV) had ordered around 2700 disabled people to park the bikes they had been given by them.

In late February, she promised improvements to soil protection, and said it would be a central part in the then upcoming National Transportation Plan that would be presented in autumn. This was also noted as an increase from the original protection sought by her predecessor, Liv Signe Navarsete.

In late March, she caused controversy when she tweeted a response to another user, ending in f'***k Oslo. When confronted with the tweet, Arnstad added that she had only meant to express that it was nice to be back home in Trøndelag, and stated that she loved Oslo, but that at the time she didn't want to be there at work.

Arnstad expressed uncertainty regarding the European Union's Single European Railway Directive 2012 when it was brought to the Storting in August 2013, and a majority of members expressed support for it. Both she and Trygve Slagsvold Vedum expressed that they didn't want Norwegian railways to be exposed to competition. Arnstad also added that the question was hypothetical, and if it was not possible to change the directive, she would also support to veto it. However, she added that it was to early to tell if it was the right way to go.

In early October, she opened the new European route E6 in Stjørdal Municipality.

Political offices
Preceded by Terje Aasland	Chair of the Standing Committee on Business and Industry; 2013–2014	Succeeded by Geir Pollestad
Preceded by Magnhild Meltveit Kleppa	Minister of Transport and Communications; 2012–2013	Succeeded by Ketil Solvik-Olsen
Preceded by Ranveig Frøiland	Minister of Petroleum and Energy; 1997–2000	Succeeded by Olav Akselsen
Party political offices
Preceded by Liv Signe Navarsete	Parliamentary Leader of the Centre Party; 2014–2025	Succeeded by Trygve Slagsvold Vedum
Preceded by Odd Roger Enoksen	Parliamentary Leader of the Centre Party; 2003–2005	Succeeded by Magnhild Meltveit Kleppa
