= Red–green coalition (Norway) =

Red-Green Coalition
- Leader: Jens Stoltenberg
- Founded: 14 September 2005
- Dissolved: 16 October 2013
- Ideology: Social democracy (Ap); Democratic socialism (SV); Agrarianism (Sp)
- Political position: Centre-left

The red–green coalition was a centre-left coalition of parties in Norway, constituting the Labour Party (Ap), the Socialist Left Party (SV), and the Centre Party (Sp). Unlike many other Red-Green coalitions, the "green" here was the colour of a centrist Eurosceptic Nordic agrarian party rather than an actual green political movement. It governed from 2005 until Labour Party leader Jens Stoltenberg resigned his cabinet on 16 October 2013 following the coalition's defeat in the 2013 elections.

Opponents of the Red-Green Coalition sometimes referred to the coalition by other names. The Norwegian centre-right parties, comprising Conservatives, Progress Party, Christian Democrats and Liberal Party, usually called it a "socialist coalition". The Red Electoral Alliance feels that "red" is not a descriptive colour for this coalition and therefore uses "pale red". Similarly, the Green Party and the Liberal Party, which also use green as their color, claim that the three parties do not deserve the green color. After the 2013 election defeat, the "red-green parties" has continued to be used informally as a moniker for the former coalition partners, although the alliance between the parties has been formally dissolved.

== History ==
The coalition was established in 2005 to constitute an alternative to the centre-right government of Kjell Magne Bondevik, and won the 2005 Norwegian parliamentary election with a slight majority. The Labour-led centre-left government formed was the first majority government in Norway since 1985. It replaced the Bondevik government on 17 October 2005.

However, different views between the three parties taking part in the coalition on several important issues led to tough negotiations at Soria Moria in Oslo to put their differences aside in order to reach a common platform.

The victory was a historical landmark for a number of reasons. The Labour Party had never been a member of a coalition government, except for a short interim at the end of World War II. The Socialist Left Party had never participated in any government, and historically had been unwilling to co-operate with Labour. In addition, the Centre Party is co-operating with the centre-left of Norwegian politics for the first time, having previously formed governments with both the Conservatives and the Christian Democratic Party on several occasions.

A good relationship between the leader of Labour Party, Jens Stoltenberg, and of the Socialist Left, Kristin Halvorsen, has been considered a major factor in forming the alliance. Halvorsen was considered more pragmatic and moderate than some of her old-guard party colleagues; the Socialist People's Party, one of SV's predecessors, was established in the early 1960s as an ideological opponent to Labour's foreign policy, and it was the main opponent to NATO membership. After the September 2005 election, some old members criticised Halvorsen for being too benign towards Labour.

The 2009 parliamentary elections resulted in a renewed majority for the Red-Green coalition, with 86 seats out of 169. The Socialist Left Party lost four seats in parliament, while the Labour Party gained three. The successful re-election of a sitting government is a rare event in Norway, and had not happened since 1993.

== Coalition cabinet (2013) ==
- Prime Minister: Jens Stoltenberg (Ap)
- Minister of the Environment: Bård Vegar Solhjell (Sv)
- Minister of Local Government and Regional Development: Liv Signe Navarsete (Sp).
- Minister of Foreign Affairs: Espen Barth Eide (Ap)
- Minister of Justice and Public Security: Grete Faremo (Ap)
- Minister of Finance: Sigbjørn Johnsen (Ap).
- Minister of Trade and Industry: Trond Giske (Ap)
- Minister of Transport and Communications: Magnhild Meltveit Kleppa (Sp)
- Minister of Health and Care Services: Jonas Gahr Støre (Ap)
- Minister of Education and Research: Kristin Halvorsen (Sv)
- Minister at the Office of the Prime Minister: Karl Eirik Schjøtt-Pedersen (Ap)
- Minister of Culture: Hadia Tajik (Ap)
- Ministry of Agriculture and Food: Lars Peder Brekk (Sp)
- Minister of Government Administration, Reform and Church Affairs: Rigmor Aasrud (Ap)
- Minister of Labour: Anniken Huitfeldt (Ap)
- Minister of Fisheries and Coastal Affairs: Lisbeth Berg-Hansen (Ap)
- Minister of Petroleum and Energy: Ola Borten Moe (Sp)
- Minister of Defence: Anne-Grete Strøm-Erichsen (Ap)
- Minister of Foreign Affairs (Development cases): Heikki Holmås (Sv)
- Minister of Children, Equality and Social Inclusion: Inga Marte Thorkildsen (Sv)

== See also ==
- Red-green alliance
- Red-green alliance (Sweden)
