= Sigbjørn Gjelsvik =

Norwegian politician

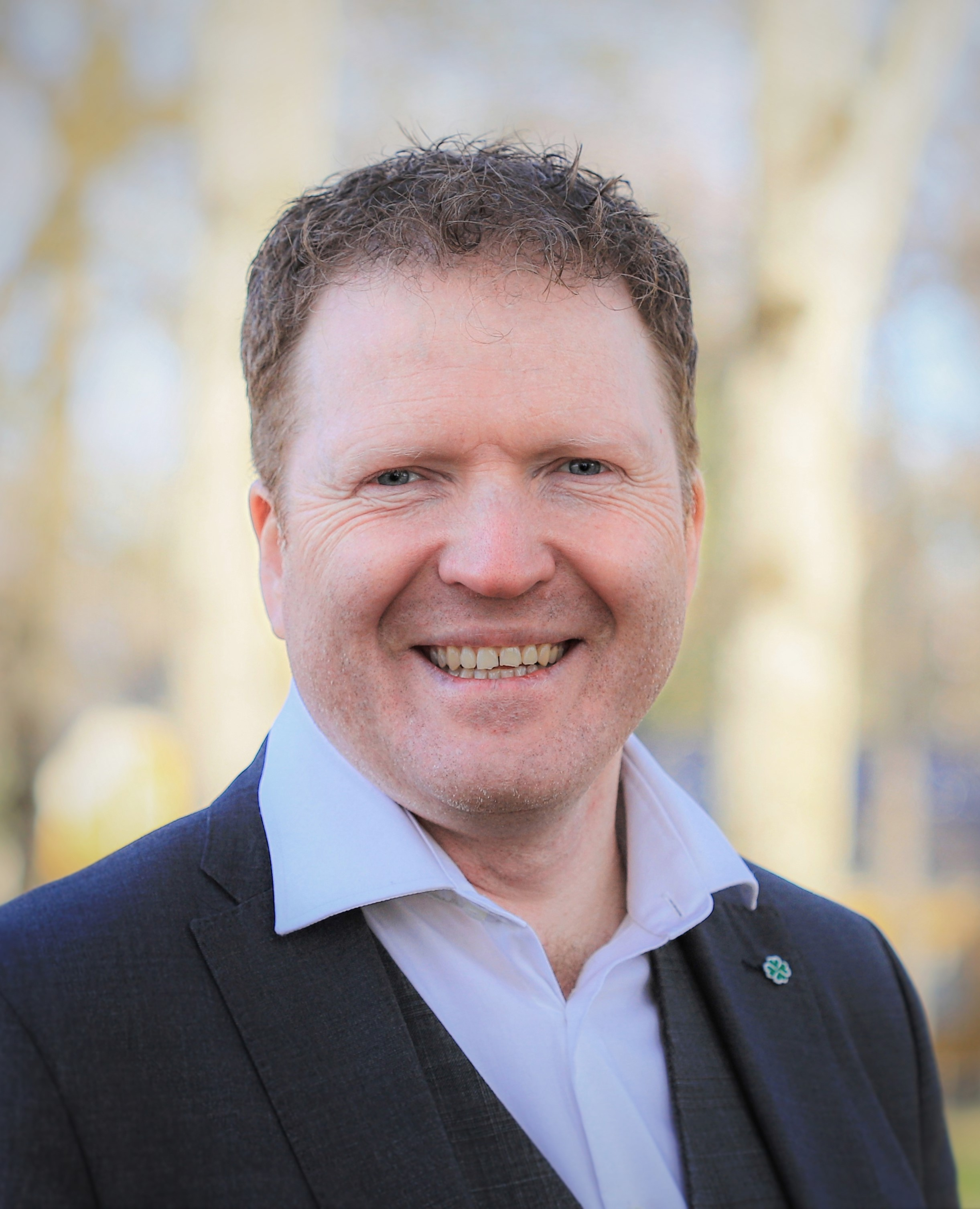
- Gjelsvik in 2021

Minister of Local Government
- In office 12 April 2022 – 16 October 2023
- Prime Minister: Jonas Gahr Støre
- Preceded by: Bjørn Arild Gram
- Succeeded by: Erling Sande

Member of the Storting
- In office 1 October 2017 – 30 September 2025
- Deputy: Kari Mette Prestrud
- Constituency: Akershus

Personal details
- Born: 30 March 1974 (age 52) Naustdal, Sogn og Fjordane, Norway
- Party: Centre
- Spouse: Margrethe Høydalsvik (m. 2011; div. 2016)
- Children: 2

Sigbjørn Gjelsvik (born 30 March 1974) is a Norwegian politician for the Centre Party. He was elected to the Storting in 2017, won re-election in 2021 but lost his seat in 2025. He also served as minister of local government from 2022 to 2023.

== Personal life and education ==
Gjeslvik was born in Naustdal Municipality in Sogn og Fjordane on 30 March 1974. He has studied economics and resource management at the Norwegian University of Agricultural Sciences. He currently lives in Sørum Municipality.

He is the son of Kjell and Edith Gjelsvik. He married Margrethe Høydalsvik in 2011, with whom he has two children, while she also had a child from a previous marriage. They divorced in 2016, a year before the 2017 election. Høydalsvik died of serious illness in April 2019, making Gjelsvik a single father.

== Political career ==
=== Youth career ===
He has been politically active in the Centre Party and Nei til EU since 1992. In 1995, he became a member of Naustdal municipal council and Sogn og Fjordane county council. In 1996, he walked 440 km on foot from Oslo to Loen in protest against the fact that as a student in Oslo he was not allowed to cover travel expenses at municipal board meetings. The case ended with County Governor agreeing with Gjelsvik that he should have his travel expenses covered. Gjelsvik sat on the county board for the Centre Youth in Sogn og Fjordane from 1992 to 1995 and on the Centre Youth's central board from 1994 to 2000. He was the Centre Youth's political deputy leader from 1997 to 1998 and leader from 1998 to 2000. He was also leader in Nei til EU from 1999 to 2004.

=== Parliament ===
Gjelsvik was elected to the Storting from Akershus in the 2017 election. Prior to this, he was employed as head of the secretariat for the Centre Party's parliamentary group. He successfully sought re-election to the Storting in the 2021 election.

He also served as the Centre Party's financial spokesperson until his government appointment in April 2022.

Following the 2021 election, Gjelsvik was brought in by party leader Trygve Slagsvold Vedum, along with parliamentary leader Marit Arnstad, to assist in the subsequent government negotiations with the Labour Party following the Socialist Left Party's withdrawal from the negotiations. Gjelsvik was also mentioned as a strong candidate to become minister of finance, second to Marit Arnstad. However, after Jonas Gahr Støre rejected his appointment, Vedum himself became a more probable candidate to the post. The Labour Party had prompted that the Centre Party should rather appoint someone from their leadership to the post, a position Gjelsvik did not hold.

Following his departure as minister of local government, Gjelsvik became chair of the Standing Committee on Transport and Communications.

He had sought re-election at the 2025 election, but ultimately lost his seat.

=== Minister of Local Government ===
On 12 April 2022, in a minor reshuffle following Odd Roger Enoksen's resignation, Gjelsvik was appointed minister of local government, succeeding Bjørn Arild Gram who had been appointed Enoksen's successor.

==== 2022 ====
A week after becoming minister, Gjelsvik expressed support to soften the "beach zone", and let municipalities to override state regulations in the districts. The beach zone rule prohibits construction of properties no more than 100 metres (330 ft) from a beach. However, his proposal was opposed by the Norwegian Association for Outdoor Organisations, who argued that beach zones should be more available to the public. They also expressed that there should be more political will to change the rule in a general sense.

At a press conference on 29 April, the government announced that temporary changes to laws in order to include Ukrainian refugees. Gjelsvik spoke about residencies and changes to a law regarding it. The temporary change to it would allow municipalities to settle refugees faster and more effectively. He stated: "An important prerequisite for success with this is that there is enough access to housing in the municipalities. It is important that the municipalities have more room for maneuver, so that they can quickly and efficiently provide enough housing for the refugees. Therefore, the government proposes to introduce a temporary emergency authority in the Planning and Building Act".

On 7 June, Gjelsvik announced that the government would look into dividing Kristiansand Municipality after Søgne Municipality and Songdalen Municipality were merged with it, with heavy opposition from the latter's populations. He also added that the task would be given to the county governor, which would in effect be a call for a referendum on the matter. He stated: "When I now take this initiative, I will facilitate a good dialogue with the municipality and the county governor about the further process. A referendum will be held in Søgne and Songdalen in connection with the local elections in 2023. It is also important to have a good dialogue with the employees". A week later, he announced that a referendum would be held only in Søgne and Sogndalen on whether or not they should re-emerge as separate municipalities from Kristiansand.

On 2 August, the Norwegian government announced that it would be covering parts of the costs of an eventual split of the merged Kinn Municipality. Gjelsvik stated: "I want to give the municipality and the population predictability around the financial framework of a possible reversal process, before they make their assessment of whether Kinn should be split. I have today sent a letter to Kinn municipality with further information about the financial consequences of a possible splitting of the municipality".

On 21 September, two Nordland municipalities sought out to ask the government for permission to become "free-municipalities" to get exemptions from certain laws and regulations. The Norwegian Society for the Conservation of Nature criticised the proposal, calling it "absurd" and expressed that it would effect municipal nature and the population. Gjelsvik on the other hand was open to the idea, and said that the government would look into the issue for municipalities to apply to become free-municipalities. He also noted that it would help municipalities develop better services for their citizens.

In October, following the state budget for 2023's presentation on 6 October, Gjelsvik said it was too early to tell if too little money has been allocated for the separation of Ålesund Municipality and counties who had requested to be separated. He stated: "Now we will see what comes in from the county municipalities and Ålesund. We still have not received the applications from any of them. As long as we have not received the applications, we have no basis for assessing the extent of the need for support".

In late October, Gjelsvik and his ministry faced criticism for withholding a report into election interference. He reasoned that it would only entice conspiracy theories and couple opposition to the EEA agreement (which was used as an example in the report) with extreme political views. Researchers criticised the move, and cited that it broke with principles for independent research. Dagbladet called on Gjelsvik to apologise to the researchers that made the report and to make it available to the public. The opposition shared this sentiment, with the Conservative Party calling Gjelsvik's reasoning for "alarming". They also called on prime minister Jonas Gahr Støre to clarify whether or not he supported Gjelsvik's claim. The Green Party asserted that Gjelsvik let his believes stand in the way for public debate and questioned if he was suitable to recognise the issues the report brought up. Gjelsvik however stood by his claims, and added that the report mixed "fiction and reality" that could "derail the debate", and "sow doubts about the Norwegian electoral system". Gjelsvik's party leader, Trygve Slagsvold Vedum, contradicted him and expressed support for the report to be publicly available. Later the same day, prime minister Støre expressed praise for Gjelsvik while the report was simultaneously publicly released on the government's website.

Gjelsvik responded to criticism from the Red Party in December regarding the appointment of Kristoffer Thoner as an advisor at the Prime Minister's office. Thoner's appointment caused controversy due to his confidential customer lists when he worked for McKinsey & Company. Gjelsvik stated that the government would be putting forward a consultation note by spring 2023 and "prepare a possible proposal for changes to the Act on the registration of government members' positions and financial interests". The Red Party however noted that Gjelsvik would be opening to going against a parliamentary resolution by suggesting a "possible proposal".

==== 2023 ====
In January 2023, he visited Ålesund to talk with the mayor and deputy mayor about the government paying the bill for the split between Ålesund Municipality and Haram Municipality. Ålesund Municipality had previously threatened to stop the split between the two merged municipalities if the government didn't say how they would cover the bill of a reversal. The mayor, Eva Vinje Aurdal, had expressed optimism following the meeting, and also hoped for the reversal to be done before the September local elections and the next year. Gjelsvik compared the situation to the COVID-19 expenses, saying: "When we dealt with corona expenses last year, we were clear that we should stand up for the municipal sector and cover all necessary and direct costs related to corona. We followed that up with more than 10 billion NOK. Now the political commitment from the government is that we must cover the necessary and direct costs related to the reversal of mergers of municipalities and counties".

In February, the Kristiansand Municipal Council voted against separating Søgne and Songdalen from its current structure, in addition to rejecting a referendum on the matter. Despite this, Gjelsvik stated that the government had "registered their wishes", but that the government would listen to the population of Søgne and Sogndalen, implying that the government would still push for a referendum despite Kristiansand's verdict on the matter.

In June, Gjelsvik announced that the government would give 68 million NOK to Troms og Finnmark county to be spent on separation and that there would be a deduction for remaining uncertain costs.

In September, media revealed that Gjelsvik had inappropriately kissed a female subordinate at a pub in August 2022 during a staff celebration. He apologised for the incident and the woman involved expressed that she felt the case was handled accordingly.

On 16 October, Gjelsvik was replaced by Erling Sande in a cabinet reshuffle.

== Other ==
He has also been the project manager for "Alternatives to the current EEA agreement".

In 2020, he was convicted on delivering insufficient information to the buyer of a property, and ordered to pay 400,000 kr in damages.

Political offices
Preceded by Bjørn Arild Gram	Minister of Local Government; 2022–2023	Succeeded by Erling Sande
Preceded by Erling Sande	Chair of the Standing Committee on Transport and Communications; 2023–present	Incumbent
Party political offices
Preceded by N/A	Centre Party Financial Spokesperson ?–2022	Succeeded by Geir Pollestad
