= Erling Sande =

Norwegian politician (born 1978)

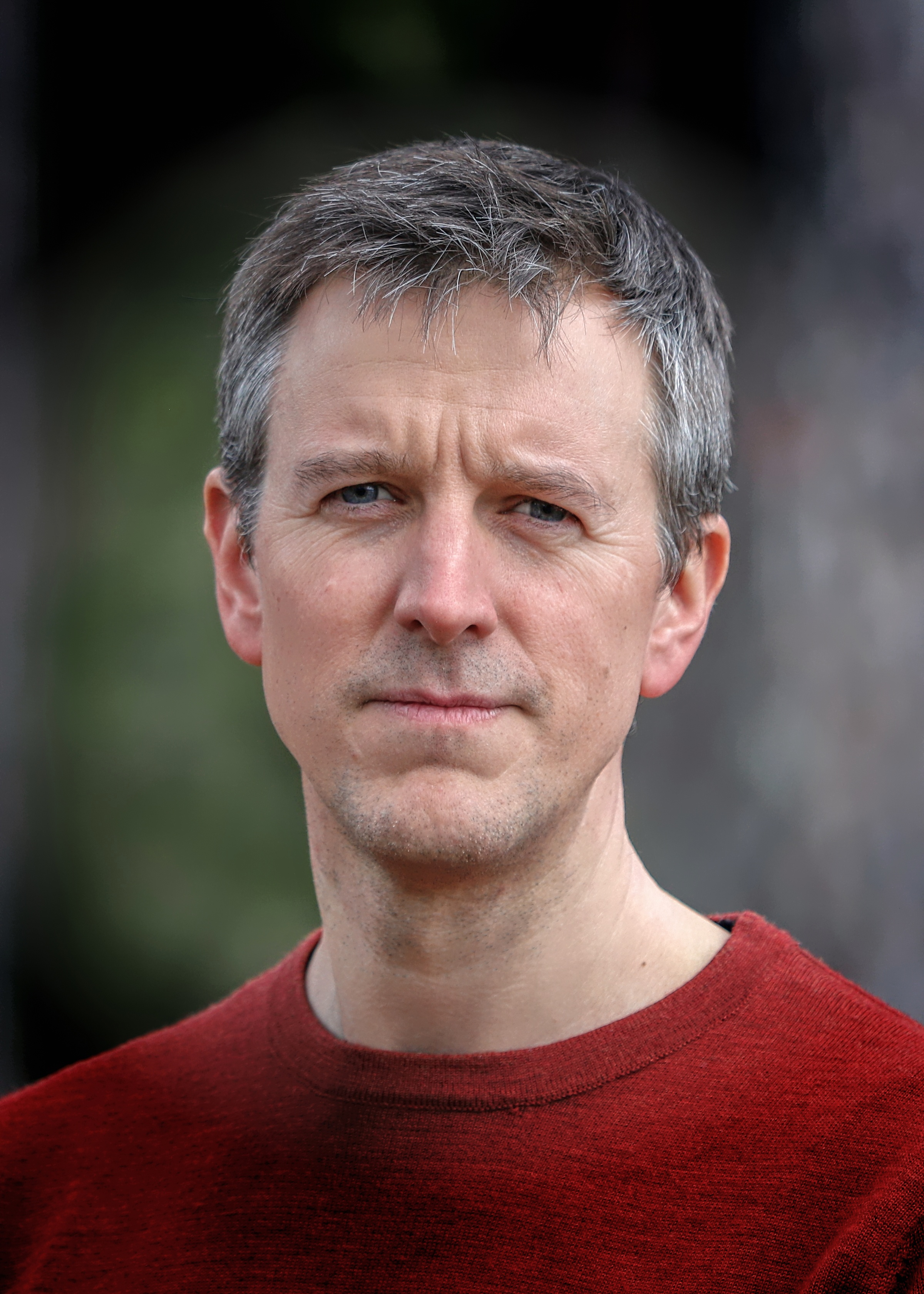
- Sande in 2021

Minister of Local Government
- In office 16 October 2023 – 4 February 2025
- Prime Minister: Jonas Gahr Støre
- Preceded by: Sigbjørn Gjelsvik
- Succeeded by: Kjersti Stenseng

Member of the Storting
- Incumbent
- Assumed office 1 October 2021
- Deputy: Aleksander Øren Heen
- Constituency: Sogn og Fjordane

Deputy Member of the Storting
- In office 1 October 2005 – 30 September 2013
- Deputising for: Liv Signe Navarsete
- Succeeded by: Jenny Følling
- Constituency: Sogn og Fjordane

Personal details
- Born: 8 November 1978 (age 47) Bremanger Municipality, Sogn og Fjordane, Norway
- Party: Centre
- Children: 2

Erling Sande (born 8 November 1978 in Bremanger Municipality) is a Norwegian politician for the Centre Party. He represents Sogn og Fjordane in the Norwegian Parliament, where he deputised for Liv Signe Navarsete, who served in government between 2005 and 2013. He was elected as a regular representative following the 2021 election. Sande also served as minister of local government from 2023 to 2025.

== Political career ==
=== Parliament ===
Sande was elected as a deputy member for Sogn og Fjordane at the 2005 parliamentary election. He was re-elected in 2009, and from 17 October 2005 until the end of the 2009–13 term, he deputised for Liv Signe Navarsete, who served in government. Concurrently to deputising for Navarsete, he led the Standing Committee on Energy and the Environment from 2009 to 2013. He was a member of the committee from 2007. He also served as the second vice chair of the Standing Committee on Family and Cultural Affairs from 2005 to 2007 and was a member of the Election Committee from 2005 to 2009. In 2012, he announced that he wouldn't seek re-election at the 2013 election.

Sande returned to parliament following the 2021 election. He served as the chair of the Standing Committee on Transport and Communications between 2021 and 2023, when he was appointed minister of local government.

Following his party's withdrawal from government, he joined the Standing Committee on Business and Industry and additionally became its chair.

=== Minister of local government ===
Sande was appointed minister of local government on 16 October 2023, following a cabinet reshuffle.

==== 2023 ====
A week after assuming office, Sande rejected criticism from Kristiansand mayor Mathias Bernander that the government's proposed law to intervene to approve local referendums would weaken local democracy. Sande argued that in the case of Søgne Municipality and Songdalen Municipality, they were simply listening to the local population and reiterated that the government would pay for a potential break-up of the merged municipality. In November, the government secured a majority to pass the law when the Socialist Left Party announced that they would support it.

==== 2024 ====
In January, Sande warned that Rogaland would lose state financial scheme support if the county council didn't allow for transport services such as buses and ferries, to be free of charge. This would also encompass vehicle tolls, and he emphasised that the government would expect counties to utilise the funds for free public transport. Rogaland County Mayor Ole Ueland on the other hand, expressed that the government was punishing Rogaland and that they would rather allow people to pay for public transport and that transport would run at all rather than not. The County Council approved in February for ferries to be charged for again, effective from 15 April. However, in May, they backtracked when the government threatened to withhold further funding of 9,2 million NOK for free ferries. While Sande praised their decision, Ueland expressed that they were left with no choice when the government threatened to withhold funds.

During the referendum voting period in Søgne and Songdalen on whether they should leave or remain in Kristiansand municipality, the Norwegian Association of Local and Regional Authorities expressed concerns about voting irregularities and dangers of vote fraud. This came as a reaction following revelations of instructions on how to cheat vote had been circulated. Sande expressed that voter fraud is highly irregular in the country overall and emphasised that it is punishable by law. Furthermore he expressed his trust in the local population to be honest and fair. The referendum was held on 2 February, where a majority in both Søgne and Songdalen voted to remain a part of Kristiansand municipality. Sande announced that the government would respect the results.

During a question time in parliament in mid February, Sande criticised Liberal Party representative Alfred Bjørlo for characterising nature management by local politicians for "home alone parties", calling Bjørlo's description "disrespectful". Bjørlo later expressed he didn't regret his description as a way to get his point across.

Sande and Lene Vågslid, the chair of the Standing Committee on Local Government and Public Administration, announced in May that the government would be seeking to relocate tax revenues from larger and richer municipalities to be distributed to poorer municipalities in order to help improve local public services.

Sande had been advised by both the county governor of Vestland and environmental agencies to not approve of the building of a quay and a quarry near the rock carvings at Vingen in Bremanger Municipality, which furthermore led to an objection letter from the International Council on Monuments and Sites about the move. Bremanger Municipality had also initially approved of the move on the local level, but backtracked in September and likewise did Sande. He argued that he had approved of the move in respect to the local government's decision making, and likewise did so when the municipality backtracked on their decision.

Sande was faced with allegations by the mayor of Moskenes Municipality Hanna Sverdrup in November, who alleged that he had yelled at her during a meeting over the subject of the municipality's poor economic situation, supposedly calling it "the worst municipality" in the country. Sande denied the accusations, explaining that he had been stern and tried to hold the municipality accountable, while also adding that he was concerned about Moskenes' deteriorating economic situation.

==== 2025 ====
Sande faced criticism in January over his lack of response to the downgrading of nature by municipalities between 2017 and 2022, which in effect had violated the law on biodiversity. Sande stated that he was confident that "municipalities are aiming to follow the law" and that it was "meaningless to punish them for violations committed many years ago".

Following the Centre Party's withdrawal from government, he was succeeded by Labour Party secretary Kjersti Stenseng on 4 February 2025.

== Personal life ==
Sande is married and has two sons.

Political offices
New office	Second Vice Chair of the Standing Committee on Family and Cultural Affairs; 2005–2007	Succeeded by Trond Lode
Preceded by Gunnar Kvassheim	Chair of the Standing Committee on Energy and the Environment; 2009–2013	Succeeded by Ola Elvestuen
Preceded by Helge Orten	Chair of the Standing Committee on Transport and Communications; 2021–2023	Succeeded by Sigbjørn Gjelsvik
Preceded by Sigbjørn Gjelsvik	Minister of Local Government; 2023–2025	Succeeded by Kjersti Stenseng
