= Ole André Myhrvold =

Norwegian politician

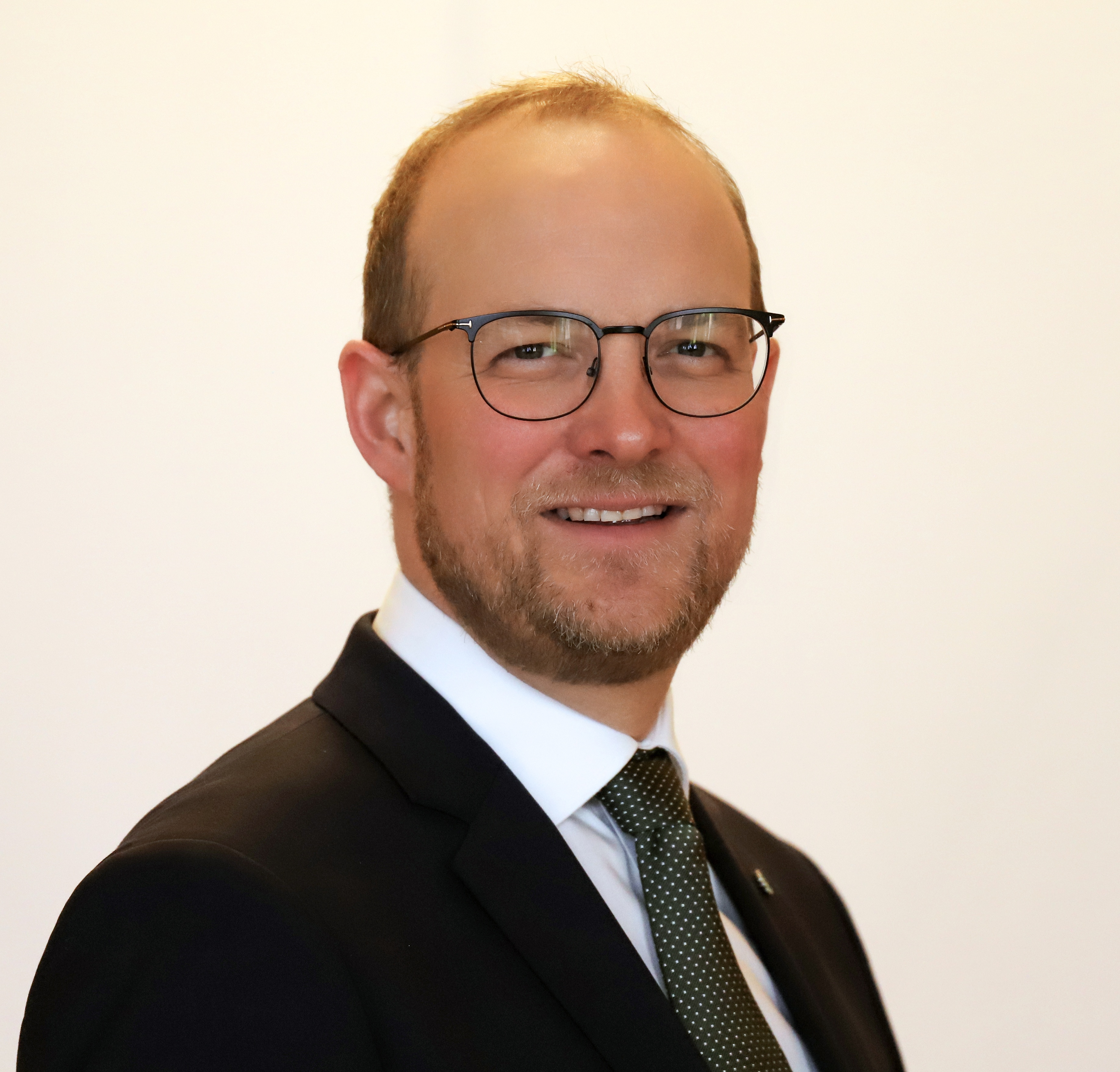
- Myhrvold in 2020

General Secretary of the Centre Party
- Incumbent
- Assumed office 1 April 2026
- Leader: Trygve Slagsvold Vedum
- Preceded by: Knut M. Olsen

Member of the Storting
- In office 1 October 2017 – 30 September 2025
- Constituency: Østfold

Mayor of Trøgstad
- In office October 2011 – 18 September 2017
- Deputy: Tor Melvold
- Preceded by: Tor Melvold
- Succeeded by: Svend Saxe Frøshaug

Personal details
- Born: 10 June 1978 (age 48)
- Party: Centre
- Occupation: Journalist

Ole André Myhrvold (born 10 June 1978) is a Norwegian politician and journalist for the Centre Party. He has served as the party's general secretary since 2026 and was a member of parliament for Østfold between 2017 and 2025. He also previously served as the mayor of Trøgstad from 2011 to 2017.

== Political career ==
=== Local politics ===
Myhrvold was mayor of Trøgstad from 2011 to 2017 and a member of the municipal council from 2007 to 2017. Myhrvold led a coalition consisting of his own Centre Party, the Conservative and Christian Democratic parties, but the former later withdrew from the coalition. He was re-elected in 2015, this time leading a coalition with the Labour Party. He resigned as mayor in September 2017 after being elected to parliament, and was succeeded by Svend Saxe Frøshaug.

=== Parliament ===
Myhrvold was elected to the Storting from Østfold in the 2017 election and was re-elected in 2021. He is currently a member of the Standing Committee on Energy and the Environment. In September 2023, he was appointed the party's financial spokesperson, succeeding Geir Pollestad who had entered government as minister of agriculture and food. He previously served as the party's spokesperson on energy policy until changing to finance, and was succeeded by Gro-Anita Mykjåland.

He had sought re-election at the 2025 election, but ultimately lost his seat.

=== Party politics ===
In February 2026, he was appointed general secretary of the Centre Party, succeeding Knut Magnus Olsen, who retired after fifteen years in the position. He assumed office on 1 April.

== Civic career ==
Up until becoming mayor of Trøgstad, Myhrvold had worked as the head of industry policy at Coop Norge SA. After leaving parliament, he announced in January 2026 that he would return to working for Coop, this time as a senior communications advisor.
