= Åslaug Haga =

Norwegian politician

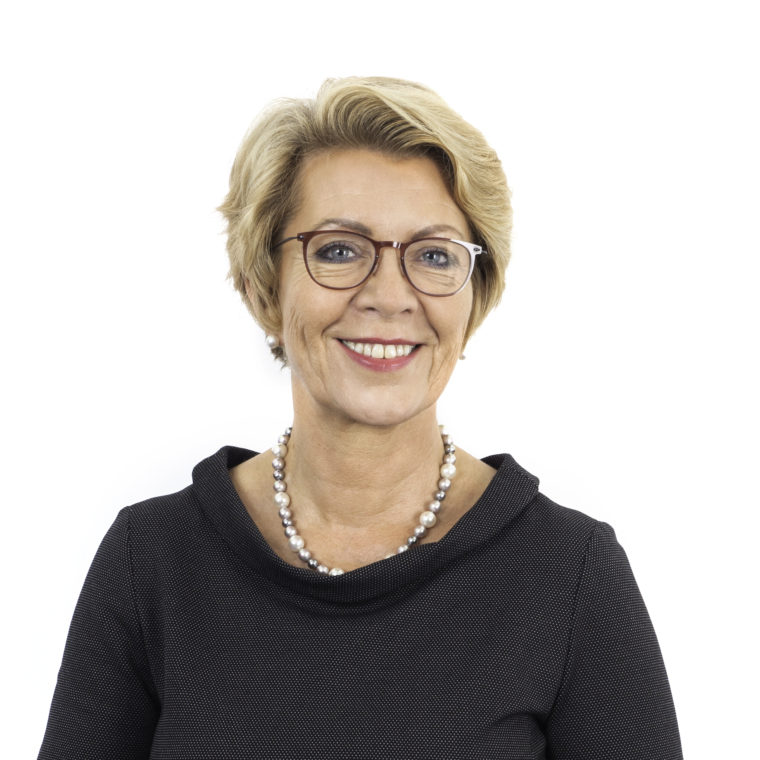
- Åslaug Haga, after entering the government in 2005

Minister of Petroleum and Energy
- In office 21 September 2007 – 20 June 2008
- Prime Minister: Jens Stoltenberg
- Preceded by: Odd Roger Enoksen
- Succeeded by: Terje Riis-Johansen

Minister of Local Government
- In office 17 October 2005 – 21 September 2007
- Prime Minister: Jens Stoltenberg
- Preceded by: Erna Solberg
- Succeeded by: Magnhild Meltveit Kleppa

Minister of Culture
- In office 8 October 1999 – 17 March 2000
- Prime Minister: Kjell Magne Bondevik
- Preceded by: Anne Enger
- Succeeded by: Ellen Horn

Leader of the Centre Party
- In office 25 March 2003 – 19 June 2008
- Deputy: Lars Peder Brekk
- Preceded by: Odd Roger Enoksen
- Succeeded by: Liv Signe Navarsete

Member of the Norwegian Parliament
- In office 1 October 2001 – 30 September 2009
- Deputy: Dagfinn Sundsbø
- Constituency: Akershus

Personal details
- Born: 21 October 1959 (age 66) Nes, Akershus, Norway
- Party: Centre
- Occupation: Diplomat
- Profession: Political scientist

Åslaug Marie Haga (born 21 October 1959) is a Norwegian diplomat, politician and international civil servant. She has been board chair for various organizations, including the Norwegian Institute for Nature Research (NINA) and the Peace Research Institute in Oslo (PRIO). Haga has published three books: two on Norwegian politics and one novel.

She is currently the associate vice-president of the External Relations and Governance Department at the International Fund for Agricultural Development (IFAD), a specialized agency of the United Nations.

Prior to that, she was executive director of the Global Crop Diversity Trust from 2013 to 2019.

== Early life and career ==
Haga was born in Nes, Akershus. She has a bachelor's degree in political science, history and sociology from the University of Oslo. She joined the diplomatic corps before finishing her master's degree in political science. She served at the Norwegian delegation to the United Nations in New York in the late 1980s and at the Norwegian embassy in New Delhi, India in the early 1990s.

== Political career ==
Haga served as State Secretary for Foreign Affairs from 1991 – 1997 and Minister of Culture from 1999 to 2000. In 2001, she was elected to the Storting from Akershus County, and she was re-elected in 2005. In 2003, while the Centre Party was an opposition party, she became party leader. As leader of the Centre Party, Haga was instrumental in swinging the party's political course to the left, bringing it into a coalition with the Labour Party and the Socialist Left Party for the first time.

Following the success of this Red-Green Coalition in the 2005 parliamentary elections, the Centre Party entered the government, and Haga succeeded Erna Solberg as Minister for Local Municipalities and Regional Development in the second cabinet Stoltenberg. In September 2007, she became Minister of Petroleum and Energy, succeeding Odd Roger Enoksen, and leaving the regional department to Magnhild Meltveit Kleppa. On 11 April 2008, Haga announced that she would not be seeking re-election to Parliament at the 2009 election, and that she would step down as Centre Party leader before the election.

On 19 June 2008, she resigned as Minister of Petroleum and Energy, and as leader of the Centre Party. She suffered from health problems following a media storm about minor building violations that she was unaware of. Haga was replaced as Minister of Petroleum and Energy by Terje Riis-Johansen.

== Norwegian Air Ambulance ==
Haga was Secretary General of the Norwegian Air Ambulance from 2011 – 2013. A new training centre for rescue personnel – including medical doctors and pilots - was established at Torpomoen under her leadership.

== Global Crop Diversity Trust ==
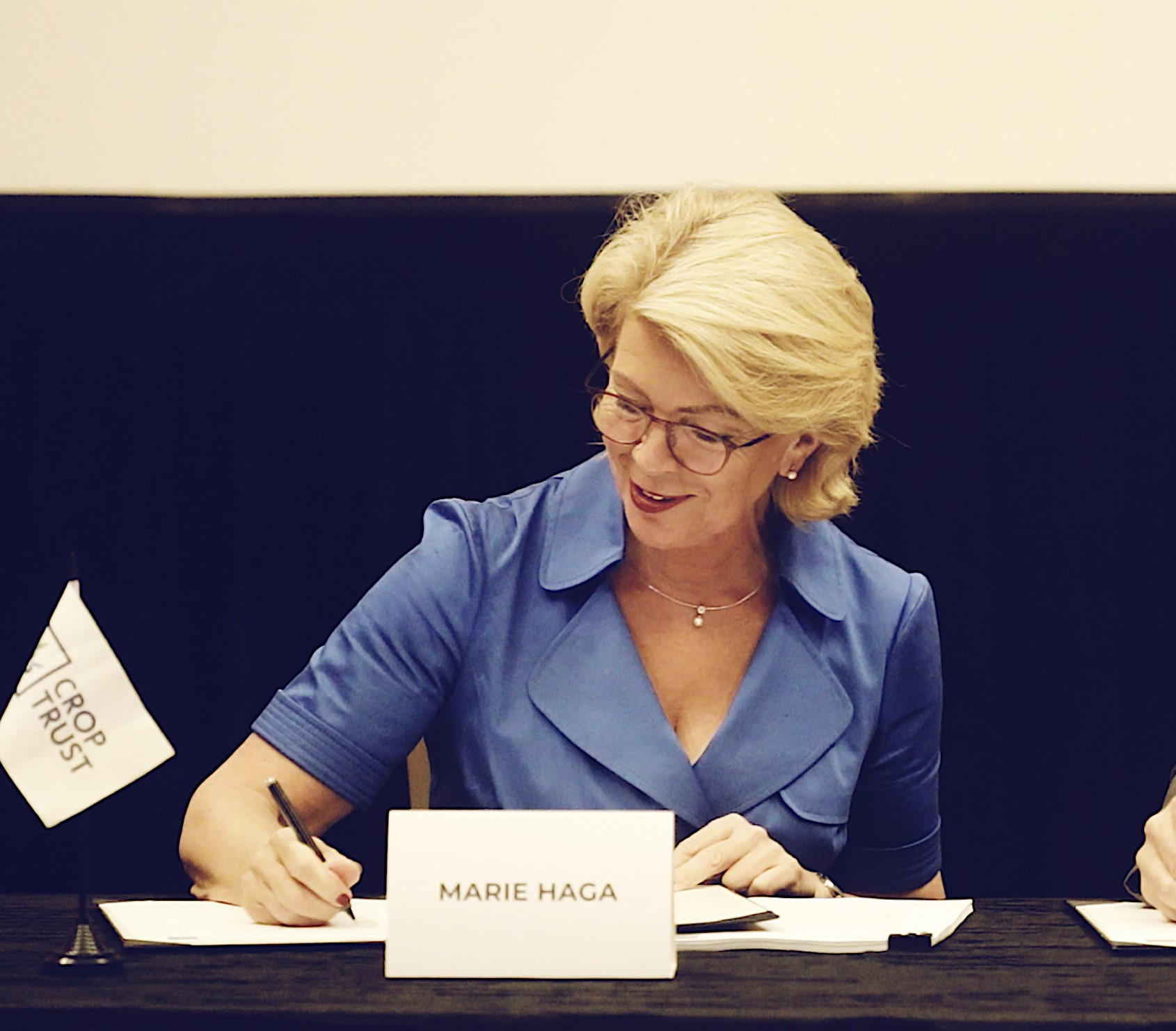
Marie Haga during the 5th International Rice Congress in Singapore on World Food Day.

Haga replaced Cary Fowler as executive director of the Global Crop Diversity Trust in early 2013 and held that position until the end of 2019. Under Haga's leadership the Crop Trust became an independent international organization with a strong voice in agrobiodiversity conservation and use. She was responsible for, and signed, the first agreement to safeguard crops in perpetuity with the International Rice Research Institute in 2018.

== International Fund for Agricultural Development (IFAD) ==
Haga is currently Associate Vice-president of the External Relations and Governance Department at IFAD. She is responsible for communications, global engagement, partnerships, and resource mobilization, as well as overseeing the relations with IFAD's 177 Member States.

Political offices
Preceded by Anne Enger Lahnstein	Norwegian Minister of Culture; 1999–2000	Succeeded by Ellen Horn
Preceded by Erna Solberg	Norwegian Minister of Local Government and Regional Development; 2005–2007	Succeeded by Magnhild Meltveit Kleppa
Preceded by Odd Roger Enoksen	Norwegian Minister of Petroleum and Energy; 2007–2008	Succeeded by Terje Riis-Johansen
Party political offices
Preceded by Odd Roger Enoksen	Leader of the Centre Party; 2003–2008	Succeeded by Lars Peder Brekk (acting)
