= Pål Farstad =

Norwegian politician (born 1959)

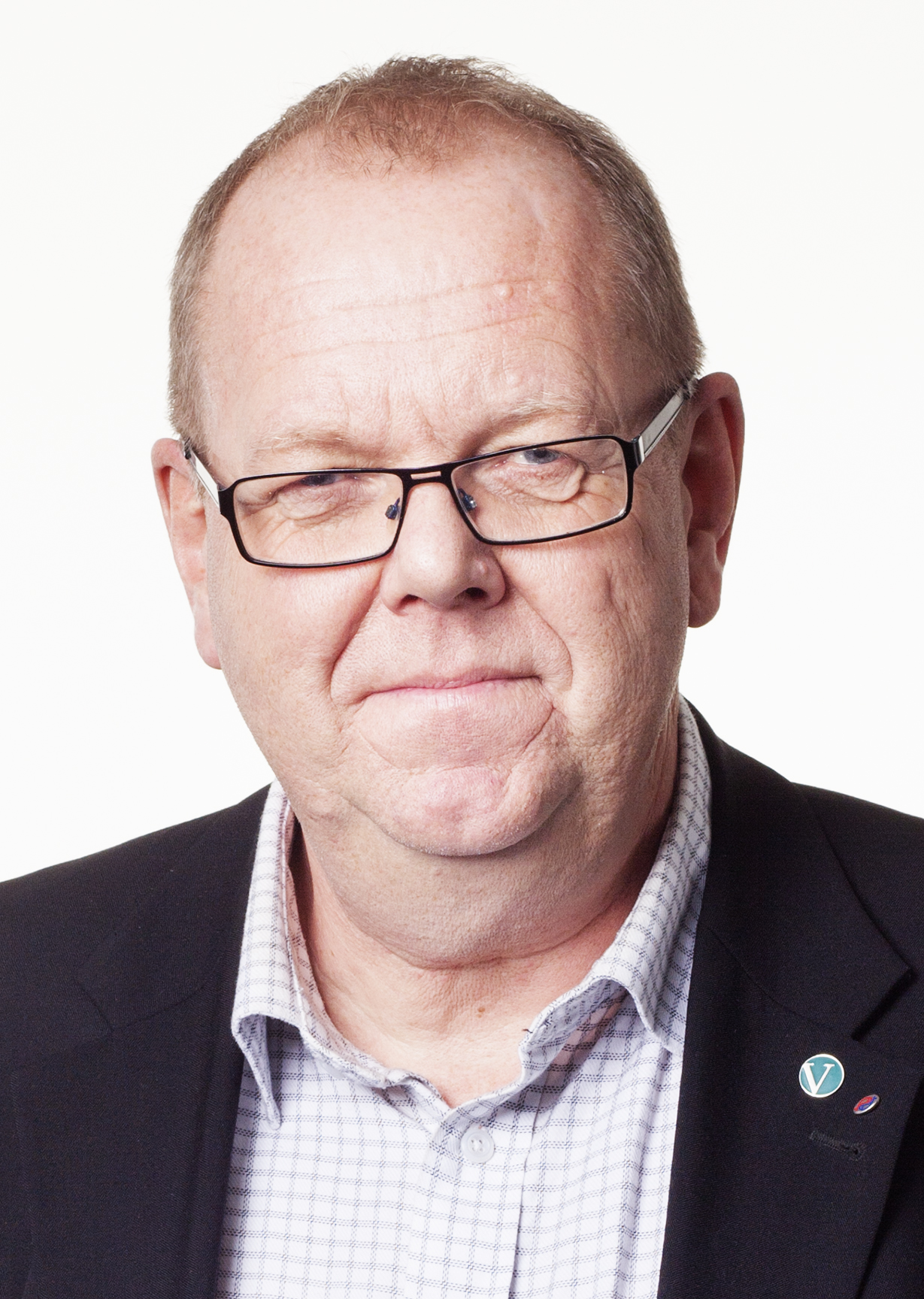
- Born: 1 April 1959 (age 66)
- Occupation: Politician
- Known for: Member of the Storting

Pål Farstad (born 1 April 1959) is a Norwegian politician for the Liberal Party. He was elected to the Parliament of Norway from Møre og Romsdal in 2013 where he is member of the Standing Committee on Business and Industry.
