= Terje Aasland =

Norwegian politician

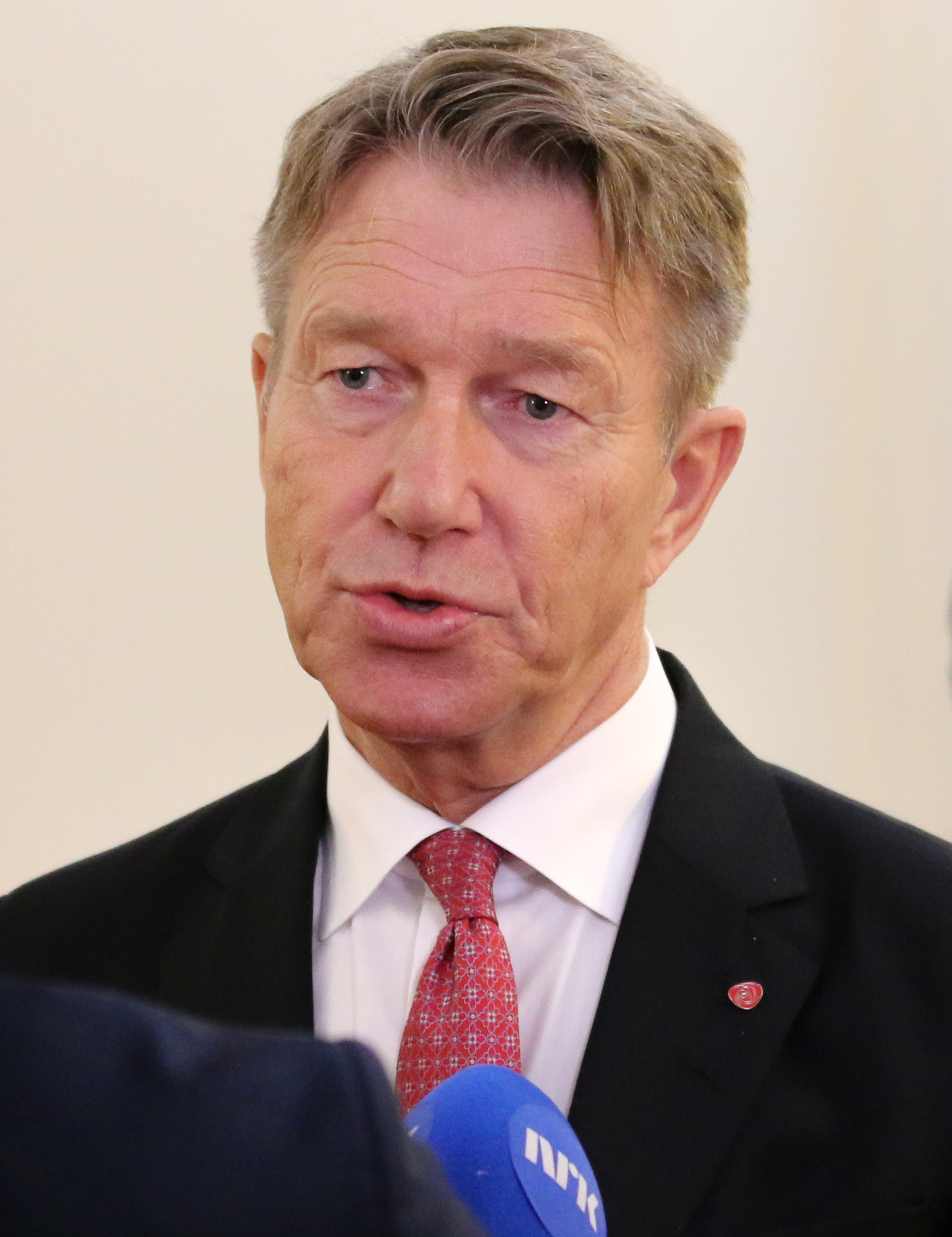
- Aasland in 2025

Minister of Energy (Note: Minister of Petroleum and Energy until 1 January 2024.)
- Incumbent
- Assumed office 7 March 2022
- Prime Minister: Jonas Gahr Støre
- Preceded by: Marte Mjøs Persen

Deputy Parliamentary Leader of the Labour Party
- In office 13 October 2021 – 7 March 2022
- Leader: Rigmor Aasrud
- Preceded by: Hadia Tajik
- Succeeded by: Åsmund Grøver Aukrust; Lene Vågslid

Member of the Storting
- Incumbent
- Assumed office 1 October 2005
- Deputy: Jone Blikra
- Constituency: Telemark

Personal details
- Born: 15 February 1965 (age 61) Skien, Telemark, Norway
- Party: Labour
- Spouse: Marit Aasland
- Children: 3

Terje Aasland (born 15 February 1965, in Skien) is a Norwegian politician for the Labour Party. He has served as Minister of Energy since 2022. He has also been a member of parliament for Telemark since 2005.

== Education ==
Aasland is an electrician by trade. He spent parts of his professional career in trade unions.

== Political career ==
=== Local politics ===
On the local level, Aasland held various positions in Skien municipality council from 1991 to 2003. He chaired the local party chapter from 1995 to 2000, and was the deputy leader of the county chapter from 1998 to 2000. During the same period he was a member of the Labour Party national board.

=== Parliament ===
He was elected to the Norwegian Parliament from Telemark in 2005 and has been re-elected since.

Aasland was first vice chair of the Standing Committee on Energy and the Environment from 2013 to 2017. He also served as the chair of the Standing Committee on Business and Industry from 2009 to 2013. He then served as second vice chair of the Standing Committee on Business and Industry from 2017 to 2021, and as the chair of the Standing Committee on Energy and the Environment from 2021 to 2022.

After his party won the 2021 election, Aasland was appointed deputy parliamentary leader.

In February 2022, Aasland opened for the use of ocean wind to electrify the Norwegian shelf. He said: "I believe that the development of offshore wind can happen faster than people think, and that it can be a win-win situation for Norway".

=== Minister of Petroleum and Energy ===
Following Hadia Tajik's resignation after controversy regarding the use of a government apartment and fringe benefit; Marte Mjøs Persen was appointed her successor on 7 March 2022. Aasland was appointed Persen's successor.

On 16 October 2023, alongside a cabinet reshuffle, the government announced that the Ministry of Petroleum and Energy would be renamed the Ministry of Energy from 1 January 2024. Thus Aasland's position was renamed Minister of Energy from the same date.

In August 2025, he became the longest serving minister of energy in Norwegian history.

==== 2022 ====
On 23 March, Aasland attended a seminar held by Energy Valley in Fornebu. There he announced the government's intention to set "qualitative criteria" for floating offshore wind and not just look at which bidder can give the best bid financially. To E24, he elaborated: "This means that we will set some criteria and we will evaluate the industry's projects against when we will allocate areas".

On 5 April, he announced that exploration permits had been granted for areas in the North and Barents Sea. The respective permits were given to Equinor for the North Sea, and two sub companies for Equinor, Horisont Energi AS and Vår Energi AS, for the Barents Sea. Aasland stated: "Capturing and storing CO_{2} is necessary for the world to achieve its ambitious climate goals. In Norway, we have extensive experience with storing CO_{2} from the Sleipner and Snøhvit fields, and we know that it works. The Government will facilitate the Norwegian continental shelf to retain a leading role in this area".

During a debate on Debatten on 19 April, Aasland was asked by host Fredrik Solvang if he agreed with his predecessor's statement about it being "unfortunate to place restrictions on the export of electricity and Norwegian hydropower". Aasland refused to answer the question, and referred to that the government would have a look at the power situation. He notably said that he couldn't reply to what Mjøs Persen had said months ago.

On 10 June, he announced that the government would be giving two exploration permits for storing CO_{2}, stating: "Two exploration permits have now been granted for CO_{2} storage. The allocation of these exploration permits will be an important contribution both to facilitating a new commercial industry and new profitable industrial activity that requires CO_{2} storage. These awards will strengthen the development of this important climate measure".

On 6 July, Aasland stated that he wouldn't rule out rationing and limiting electricity imports if the power shortages worsened. He specified that these measures would be more relevant for companies, but wouldn't rule out it effecting the general population.

After continuous pressure from the opposition parties and the government parties, the government announced new measures to tackle the electricity costs on 7 August. This included restrictions on exports regarding low degrees of filling. Aasland stated: "We want to be clear that people do not have to fear a lack of electricity for their homes during the winter. Unfortunately, we see that prices are likely to be even higher in the future than previous estimates". He also emphasised that the electricity supply was better than weeks prior.

In response to a question from Progress Party MP Marius Arion Nilsen on 2 September; Aasland stated that there hadn't been any new estimates of how much the electricity bill would effect individual households as a consequence of electrifying the petroleum shelves since 2020. Nilsen in turn called it "irresponsible" of the government to go ahead with electrifying the shelves without estimating the effects of electricity prices.

In October, after President of the European Commission Ursula von der Leyen expressed interest in negotiating with Norway over price corridors for gas, Aasland rejected the idea. He asserted that the Norwegian government didn't sell the gas, but the companies did, and they followed the terms of the market. He did however affirm that Norway was in dialogue with the European Union about stabilising the energy markets.

The EU proposed a price corridor for gas in November, which Aasland warned against. He instead proposed more market based solutions. He also expressed understanding for it being proposed, in order to ease the tension in the energy market.

In mid-December, Aasland admitted that the government hadn't found any immediate solutions to the high electricity prices. He did however express hope that the Energy Commission that the government had put down, would be able to find long-term solutions and other short-term solutions as well.

==== 2023 ====
In January 2023, Aasland criticised his fellow cabinet colleague Ola Borten Moe after he criticised his own government's hydrogen investments. Aasland expressed that Borten Moe had misunderstood the government's intentions and made miscalculations.

In February, prime minister Jonas Gahr Støre, accompanied by Aasland and finance minister Trygve Slagsvold Vedum, announced that the electricity support scheme would be expanded until 2024. Aasland specified that a 50% increase in the scheme from September and November 2022 would not be affected by the new iteration. He also stated that said change would come into effect on 1 September 2023.

On 2 March, after a crisis meeting with agriculture minister Sandra Borch and President of the Norwegian Sami Parliament Silje Karine Muotka regarding the Fosen wind farms, Aasland issued an apology to the Sami people on behalf of the government and recognised that human rights had been violated. This came in response to mass protests against the violation, which the Norwegian Supreme Court had ruled on 11 October 2021. Despite this, the protestors indicated that they would continue protesting the day after.

In June, Aasland announced that the government would be sending a proposal for hearing in the Storting, where they would suggest limitation or halts in electricity export in extreme circumstances. He argued that this would help secure important societal functions.

In August, Aasland, alongside finance minister Trygve Slagsvold Vedum and prime minister Jonas Gahr Støre announced that the government would move in for electrification of the Melkøya power plant. The move would ensue the plant to stay operational until at least 2040.

In December, his ministry announced that they had granted permission for development plans and concessions to be given for the Draugen and Njord platforms to be electrified. These would be powered from the shoreline. Aasland hailed it as a step for the industry to find solutions in order to reduce emissions.

==== 2024 ====
In January, he announced that the government would be approving a further 62 exploration permits in the Barents Sea, which would be distributed among 24 oil companies.

Aasland was called in as a witness in a court case against activists who protested against the Fosen windmills the year before. The activists involved in the case had expected him to confirm that his apology was due to their protests, but this did not happen. Instead he testified that the apology came independently of the protests and work on the wind farms' legality had started right after the Norwegian Supreme Court ruling in 2021. The activists were acquitted on 9 April.

Aasland and digitalisation minister Karianne Tung announced in April that the government would be working on legislation to limit crypto mining. The legislation would also include limiting data centres around the country, which will be obliged to register and inform what services they provide.

In early June, he admitted during a question time in parliament that current figures for energy production would make it unlikely for Norway to achieve their climate goal for 2030.

With uncertainty regarding the replacement of aging undersea power lines supplying different countries, Aasland assured in late September that the government had not yet made a decision on the matter despite Statnett indicating that it would be "rational to reinvest" in the two oldest Skagerrak lines.

==== 2025 ====
Aasland and the Labour Party announced their intention in January to implement three directives in the EU's fourth energy package, which was strongly opposed by coalition partner the Centre Party, citing concerns over it potentially violating Norwegian sovereignty and lack of national control over Norwegian energy. The party went as far as threatening to withdraw from government should parts of the package be implemented. Aasland rejected that the government would resign and both parties agreed to attempt finding a solution to their disagreements. Labour remained firm on implementing the directives, while the Centre Party remained opposed to it. The dispute came to a close by 30 January when the Centre Party decided to withdraw from the government, leaving the Støre Cabinet as a single party minority government. Two months following the Centre Party's withdrawal from government, Aasland reasserted that they were still aiming to implement the directives, including the original 2018 version and the revamped 2023 version of the Renewables directive.

In August he attended the opening of the Shell compressor system in Aukra Municipality. The system would allow the outtake of gas from the Ormen Lange gas field to increase from 75 to 85%, also allowing previously inaccessible gas to now be accessed.

==== 2026 ====
After Statnett had rejected the application for electricity supply to the new northern Norwegian submarine base in Ramsund, Aasland announced in February 2026 that the government would intervene and amend the energy law to allow electricity supply to be given to certain customers if necessary with regard to matters of national security.

In August, Aasland rejected warnings of a potential energy crisis that could occur by winter due to low water flows in reservoirs, arguing that there "is no energy crisis". Furthermore, the reservoirs had experienced their lowest water supply in thirty years. Aasland further cited that the Norwegian Water Resources and Energy Directorate had still considered the situation "safe". The Red Party accused Aasland of not taking the situation seriously.

In September, Aasland criticised the EU's decision to uphold their moratorium for oil and gas excavation in the Arctic for their Arctic strategy. He argued that without Norwegian supply, the energy situation on the continent would be worse off and that Norway should decide over Norwegian resources and not the EU.

Aasland caused some controversy in October when he was accused of being dismissive of research after an appearance on Debatten, something he which later apologised for.

== Personal life ==
Aasland is married and has three children.
