= Tor Inge Eidesen =

Norwegian politician (born 1964)

- Born: 24 July 1964 (age 62)
- Education: Norwegian University of Life Sciences
- Occupations: Farmer; Politician
- Political party: Centre Party

Tor Inge Eidesen (born 24 July 1964) is a Norwegian farmer and politician for the Centre Party.

== Biography ==
Born on 24 July 1964, Eidesen is educated as agronomist from Tveit Landbruksskole, and at the Norwegian University of Life Sciences. From 1989 to 1994 he was appointed at the Ministry of Agriculture and Food. Since 1994 he has been a farmer in Haugesund Municipality. He has been a member of the municipal council of Haugesund Municipality since 2015.

Eidesen was elected deputy representative to the Storting from the constituency of Rogaland for the period 2021–2025, for the Centre Party. He replaces Geir Pollestad at the Storting from August 2023 while Pollestad is government minister.
