= Inga Kvalbukt =

Norwegian politician

Inga Kvalbukt (born 19 May 1949 in Alstahaug Municipality) is a Norwegian politician for the Centre Party.

She was elected to the Norwegian Parliament from Nordland in 1993, but was not re-elected in 1997. She had previously served in the position of deputy representative during the terms 1985–1989, 1989–1993 and 1997–2001. From 1999 to 2000, however, she met as a regular representative meanwhile Odd Roger Enoksen was appointed to the first cabinet Bondevik.

Kvalbukt was a member of the municipal council of Hemnes Municipality from 1979 to 1991.
