= Lars Peder Brekk =

Norwegian politician (born 1955)

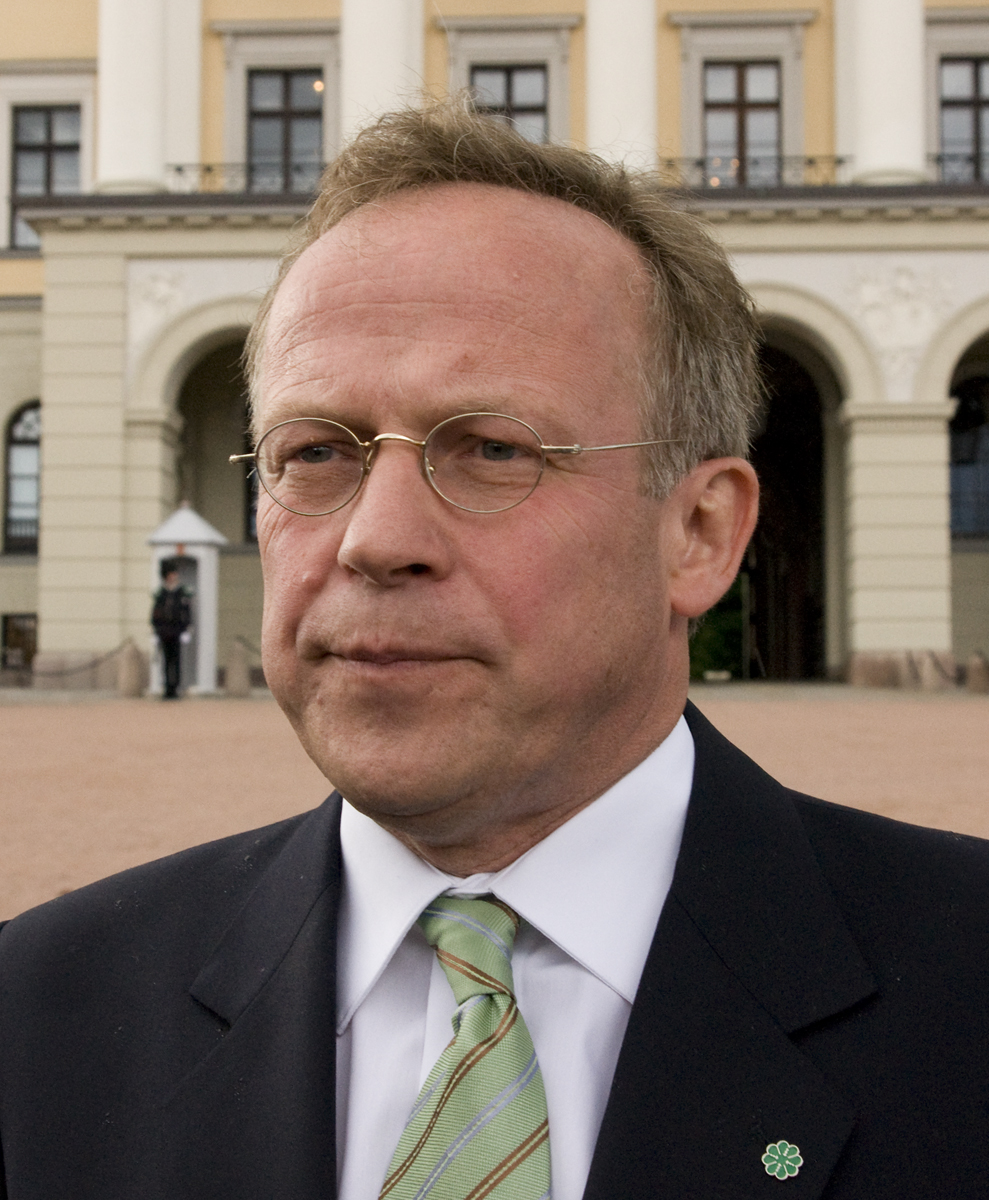
- Brekk in 2009.

Member of the Norwegian Parliament
- In office 1 October 2005 – 30 September 2013
- Deputy: Anna Ceselie Brustad Moe; Christina Ramsøy
- Constituency: Nord-Trøndelag

Parliamentary Leader of the Centre Party
- In office 18 June 2012 – 16 October 2013
- Leader: Liv Signe Navarsete
- Preceded by: Trygve Slagsvold Vedum
- Succeeded by: Liv Signe Navarsete
- In office 2 June 2007 – 20 June 2008
- Leader: Åslaug Haga
- Preceded by: Magnhild Meltveit Kleppa
- Succeeded by: Rune J. Skjælaaen

Minister of Agriculture and Food
- In office 20 June 2008 – 18 June 2012
- Prime Minister: Jens Stoltenberg
- Preceded by: Terje Riis-Johansen
- Succeeded by: Trygve Slagsvold Vedum

Minister of Fisheries
- In office 21 January 2000 – 17 March 2000
- Prime Minister: Kjell Magne Bondevik
- Preceded by: Peter Angelsen
- Succeeded by: Otto Gregussen

Leader of the Centre Party Acting
- In office 20 June 2008 – 12 September 2008
- Preceded by: Åslaug Haga
- Succeeded by: Liv Signe Navarsete

First Deputy Leader of the Centre Party
- In office 15 March 2003 – 19 March 2011
- Leader: Åslaug Haga; Liv Signe Navarsete
- Succeeded by: Ola Borten Moe
- In office 13 March 1993 – 1997
- Leader: Anne Enger
- Succeeded by: Odd Roger Enoksen

Personal details
- Born: 8 October 1955 (age 70) Vikna Municipality, Nord-Trøndelag, Norway
- Party: Centre
- Children: 3

Lars Peder Brekk (born 8 October 1955) is a Norwegian politician for the Centre Party. He was private secretary to the Minister of Fisheries 1985-1986, and himself Minister of Fisheries in 2000. He was elected to parliament in 2005 and served as Minister of Agriculture and Food from 2008 to 2012. He was acting leader of the Centre Party from June to September 2008.

== Biography ==
Brekk was born and grew up in Vikna Municipality of accountant and manager Asbjørn L. Brekk (1926–) and bookkeeper Ragnhild Kirkeby-Garstad (1935–). Aged 15, he joined the Centre Youth. He has a master of economics from the University of Oslo, studying from 1977 to 1982. He was also a football goalkeeper, playing for Stabæk from 1979 to 1981.

He worked as a secretary for the Norwegian Fisheries Association from 1982 to 1984, then as a divisional leader until 1986. From 1986 to 1987, Brekk was managing director of Global Aqua, and from 1987 to 1988 as director of finance at Hansvik Boat. He worked from 1988 to 1992 as bank manager for Sparebanken Midt-Norge in Vikna. From 1997 to 1999, he was director of finance at Nils Williksen, and from 1999 to 2005 as managing director at Innovasjon rørvik. From 1999 to 2000 he was also managing director of Pacpro Norge.

Brekk was personal secretary in the Ministry of Fisheries and Coastal Affairs from 1 January 1985 to 1 January 1986 in Willoch's Second Cabinet. In 1989–93, 1993–97 and 2001–05, Brekk was deputy member of parliament. From 21 January to 17 March 2000, he was Minister of Fisheries and Coastal Affairs in Bondevik's First Cabinet. He only sat 56 days, due to the cabinet withdrawing. While in parliament, he was first chairman of the Standing Committee on Trade and Industry (2005–07) and them member of the Standing Committee on Scrutiny and Constitutional Affairs and the Extended Standing Committee on Foreign Affairs (2007–08). From 2007 to 2008, he was parliamentary leader for the Centre Party. On 20 June 2008, Brekk was appointed Minister of Agriculture and Food in Stoltenberg's Second Cabinet.

From 1993 to 1997, and 2003 to 2011, Brekk served as the first deputy leader of the Centre Party. He is married and has three children. He owns part of a kindergarten.

Political offices
Preceded by Peter Angelsen	Norwegian Minister of Fisheries and Coastal Affairs; 2000	Succeeded by Otto Gregussen
Preceded by Terje Riis-Johansen	Norwegian Minister of Agriculture and Food; 2008-2012	Succeeded by Trygve Slagsvold Vedum
Preceded by Åslaug Haga	Acting leader of the Centre Party; 2008	Succeeded by Liv Signe Navarsete
