= Aleksander Øren Heen =

Norwegian politician

- Born: 8 June 1989 (age 36)
- Occupations: Carpenter; Politician
- Political party: Centre Party

Aleksander Øren Heen (born 8 June 1989) is a Norwegian carpenter and politician for the Centre Party. A deputy to the Storting from Sogn og Fjordane since 2013, he met as deputy for Erling Sande from 2023 to 2025.

== Personal life and education ==
Heen was born on 8 June 1989. He hails from Årdal Municipality and is a carpenter by education.

== Political career ==
=== Local politics ===
Heen was a member of the municipal council of Årdal Municipality from 2007 to 2019, and of Sogn og Fjordane county council from 2015 to 2019.

=== Parliament ===
Heen was elected deputy representative to the Storting from the constituency of Sogn og Fjordane for the periods 2013–2017, 2017–2021, and 2021–2025, for the Centre Party. He replaced Erling Sande at the Storting from October 2023 until 2025, while Sande was government minister. In the Storting, Heen was a member of the Standing Committee on Energy and the Environment from 2023 to 2024.
