= Gro-Anita Mykjåland =

Norwegian politician

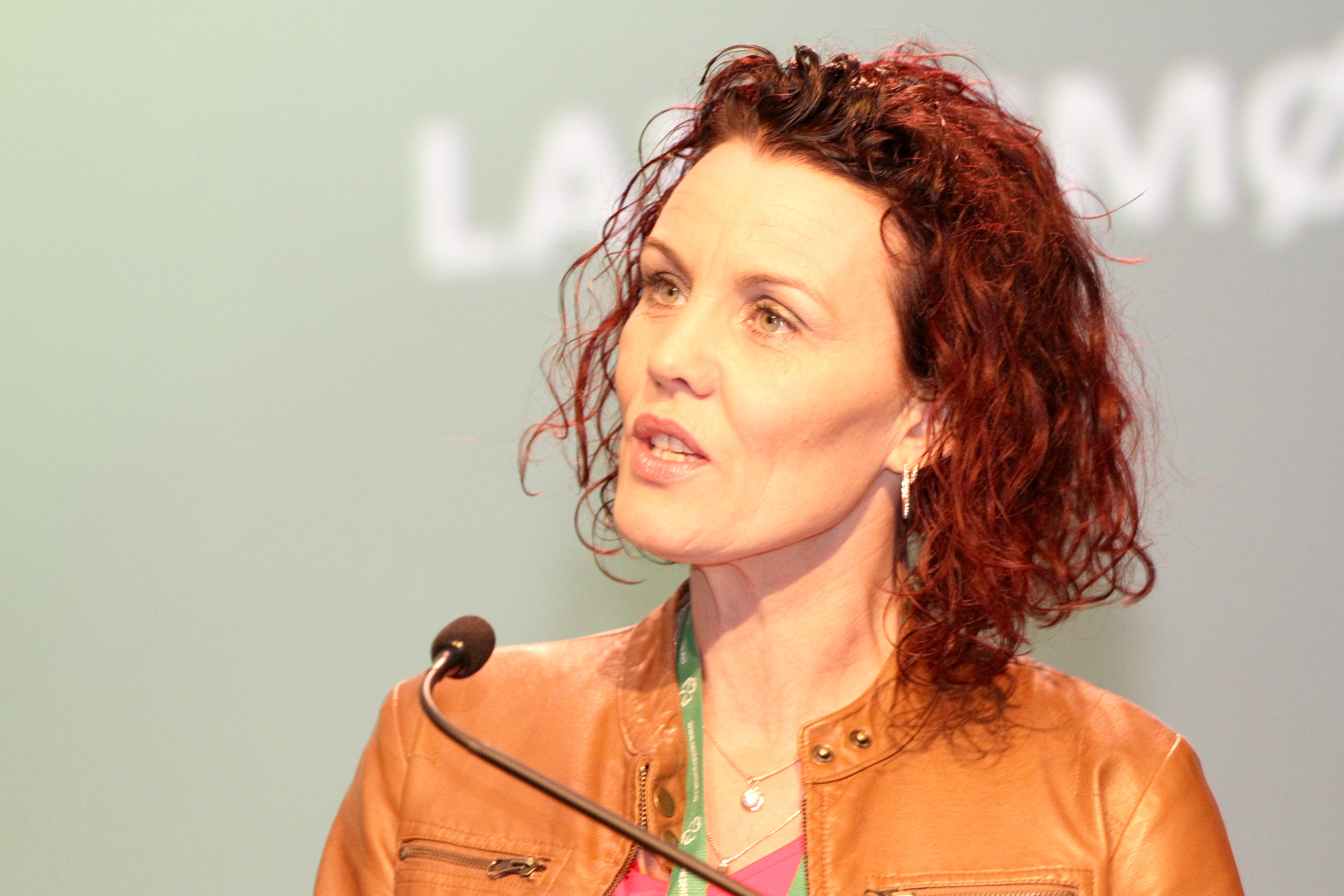

Member of the Storting
- Incumbent
- Assumed office 1 October 2021
- Constituency: Aust-Agder

Mayor of Iveland Municipality
- In office 2011 – 27 September 2021
- Preceded by: Ole Magne Omdal
- Succeeded by: Terje Møkjåland

Personal details
- Born: 4 September 1976 (age 50)
- Party: Centre
- Education: University of Agder
- Occupation: Politician

Gro-Anita Mykjåland (born 4 September 1976) is a Norwegian politician. She has been a member of the Storting for Aust-Agder since 2021. She previously served as mayor of Iveland from 2011 to 2021.

== Political career ==
=== Local politics ===
Mykjåland has been a member of the municipal council of Iveland Municipality since 2007 and was mayor of Iveland Municipality from 2011 to 2021.

=== Parliament ===
She was elected representative to the Storting from the constituency of Aust-Agder for the period 2021–2025, for the Centre Party.

In 2023, she was appointed the party's spokesperson for energy policy and concurrently deputy parliamentary leader, succeeding Ole André Myhrvold and Geir Pollestad respectively.
