= Liv Signe Navarsete =

Norwegian politician

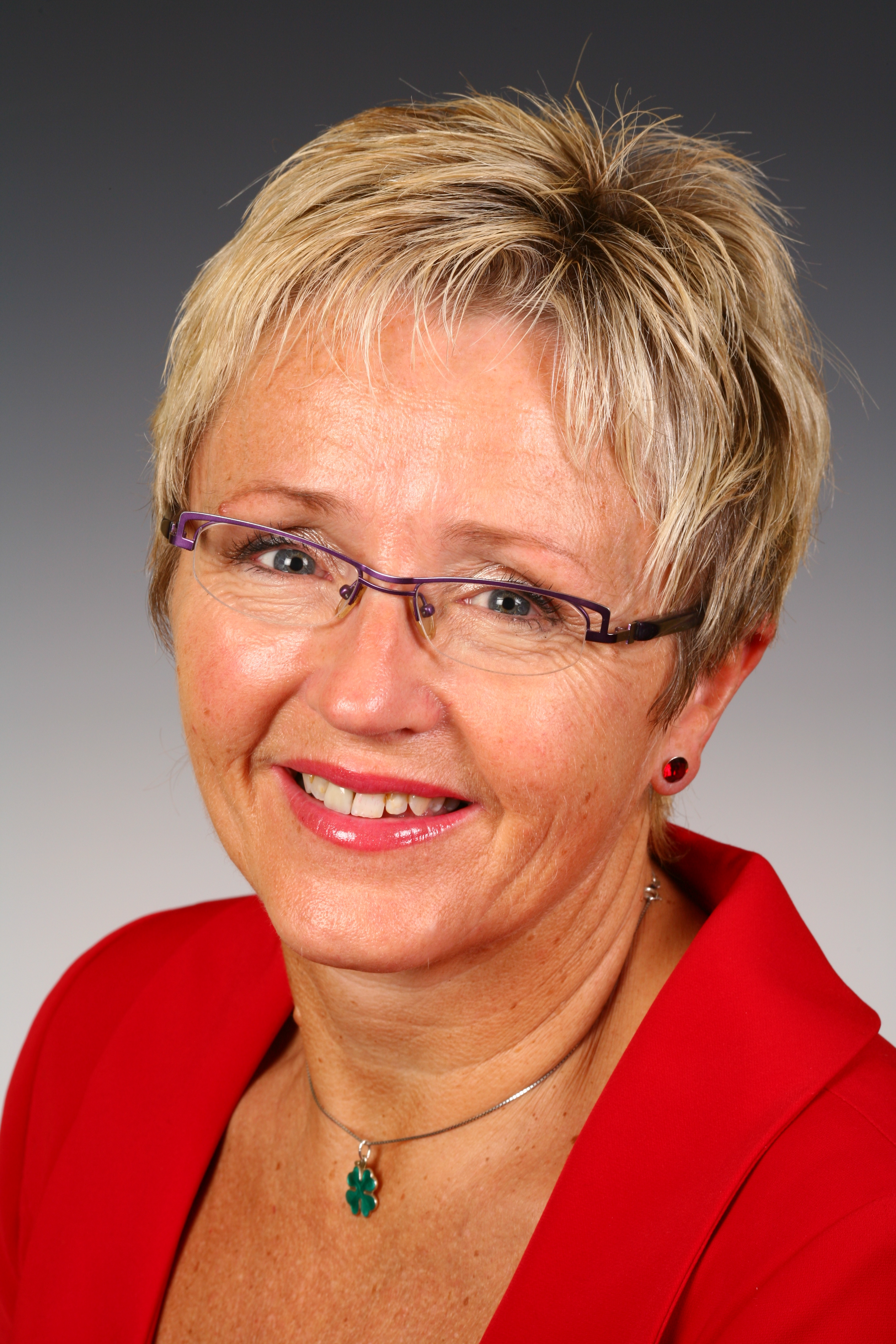

County Governor of Vestland
- Incumbent
- Assumed office 1 September 2022
- Monarch: Harald V
- Prime Minister: Jonas Gahr Støre
- Preceded by: Lars Sponheim

Leader of the Centre Party
- In office 12 September 2008 – 7 April 2014
- First Deputy: Lars Peder Brekk; Ola Borten Moe
- Second Deputy: Trygve Slagsvold Vedum
- Preceded by: Åslaug Haga
- Succeeded by: Trygve Slagsvold Vedum

Parliamentary Leader of the Centre Party
- In office 16 October 2013 – 9 April 2014
- Leader: Herself
- Preceded by: Lars Peder Brekk
- Succeeded by: Marit Arnstad

Minister of Local Government
- In office 20 October 2009 – 16 October 2013
- Prime Minister: Jens Stoltenberg
- Preceded by: Magnhild Meltveit Kleppa
- Succeeded by: Jan Tore Sanner

Minister of Transport and Communications
- In office 17 October 2005 – 20 October 2009
- Prime Minister: Jens Stoltenberg
- Preceded by: Torild Skogsholm
- Succeeded by: Magnhild Meltveit Kleppa

Member of the Storting
- In office 1 October 2005 – 30 September 2021
- Deputy: Erling Sande; Jenny Følling
- Constituency: Sogn og Fjordane

Personal details
- Born: 23 October 1958 (age 67) Sogndal, Sogn og Fjordane, Norway
- Party: Centre
- Spouse: Lars Petter Nesse
- Children: 2
- Education: Sogn og Fjordane University College; University of Bergen

Liv Signe Navarsete (born 23 October 1958 in Sogndal Municipality) is a Norwegian politician from the Centre Party. She has served as county governor of Vestland county since 2022. She previously served as Minister of Local Government from 2009 to 2013, Minister of Transport from 2005 to 2009 and party leader from 2008 to 2014. On 11 February 2014, she announced that she would retire as the leader of the party in April. She was succeeded by Trygve Slagsvold Vedum.

She was also political advisor to the Minister of Health and Social Affairs (social affairs) from 1999 to 2000. Navarsete was appointed as leader of the Centre Party in September 2008, having until then been the deputy leader.

== Career ==
=== Parliament ===
She was elected to the Storting in the 2005 election, and was re-elected three times since. She was among many notable politicians in the Storting to not seek re-election in the 2021 election. She cited her reasons to be that it was time for a generational change in the Storting, and that she wanted to focus her time on friends and family.

=== Party leader ===
Navarsete was elected as party leader on 12 September 2008, succeeding acting leader Lars Peder Brekk, who had taken over following the resignation of Åslaug Haga. She was re-elected on 6 April 2013, alongside her deputies Ola Borten Moe and Trygve Slagsvold Vedum.

On 11 February 2014, she announced she was stepping down as party leader and called for an exceptional convention to be held in April to elect her successor. On 7 April, Slagsvold Vedum was elected her successor.

=== Minister of Transport and Communications ===
Following the 2005 election, in which the Centre Party secured a majority together with the Labour and Socialist Left Party, Navarsete was appointed minister of transport and communications in Jens Stoltenberg's second cabinet on 17 October 2005.

In August 2006, Navarsete attended the opening of the first hydrogen based petrol station in Forus in Rogaland county, together with Statoil CEO Helge Lund.

On 15 January 2007, Navarsete attended the opening of the Imarsund connection in Aure Municipality. The completion of the connection was seen as the last piece in connecting the municipality from east to west.

In September 2008, after opening the new E16 straight between Voldum and Borlaug in Lærdal Municipality, the government car Navarsete was riding in, drove 110 km/h in an 80 km/h zone. She later explained that she was working while being driven, but would not classify the speeding as reckless driving.

In May 2009, Navarsete promised that a double set of railway tracks between Oslo and Lysaker would be completed by 2012. She also attended a railway forum conference, where she talked about the high demands for better maintenance of railways.

=== Minister of Local Government ===
Following the 2009 election, Navarsete was appointed minister of local government on 20 October through a reshuffle of Jens Stoltenberg's cabinet.

In November 2010, Navarsete expressed belief that some municipalities may have done more than they're capable of in regards to welfare offers. She also expressed that some municipalities who decided to cut their budgets could end up suffering from pains of growth.

In March 2011, she announced that one could personally be responsible for fixing bathrooms, contrary to what she previously said, where she expressed support for the bathroom tax. The tax would have required a lot of paperwork to be filled and "growing bureaucracy". The change was also set to go out on a parliamentary hearing come Easter. If so, the change would be put into force by autumn.

At the end of March 2012, Navarsete was revealed to have given 500,000 kr to her home municipality, where her husband was deputy mayor. This was against the recommendation given by the county.

Just prior to Stoltenberg's cabinet stepping down, Navarsete had called Bård Vegar Solhjell, then minister of the environment, asking if the newly planned E16 motorway could be relocated 300 metres from her house, which was accepted. Despite this, judicial experts asserted that she didn't brake the law by calling Solhjell, even though she probably shouldn't have called him directly. Several members of the Storting Standing Committee on Scrutiny and Constitutional Affairs called for the case to be brought up, though the committee leaders, Martin Kolberg and Erik Skutle, called it a "non-case".

=== County Governor of Vestland ===
On 3 June 2022, Navarsete was nominated to become the next county governor of Vestland. She assumed office on 1 September.

== Media ==
Navarsete has gotten several headlines during her years of office due to her temper. The first time was in April 2011 when she yelled at a woman after being accused of betraying the districts of Norway. In September 2012, she yelled at the leader of her own party's youth organization, Sandra Borch, allegedly because Borch had expressed her support for Ola Borten Moe, the deputy leader.

On 21 February 2018, it was revealed that Navarsete received a message on Messenger from a group of party colleagues on a cabin trip in 2016, that stated "We want your pussy". The message was sent from former State Secretary Morten Søberg's phone, who at the time did not have his phone. Despite demanding an inquiry, none of the colleagues present at the cabin trip admitted to having sent the message.

== Personal life ==
Navarsete married her first husband, Odd, and the two got two daughters before she had turned 21. Twelve years later, her husband died of a heart attack and she became a single mother. She married her current husband, Lars Petter Nesse, on 16 May 2000. Nesse has a son from a previous relationship.

Political offices
Preceded by Magnhild Meltveit Kleppa	Minister of Local Government; 2009–2013	Succeeded by Jan Tore Sanner
Preceded by Torild Skogsholm	Minister of Transport and Communications; 2005–2009	Succeeded by Magnhild Meltveit Kleppa
Party political offices
Preceded by Lars Peder Brekk	Leader of the Centre Party; 2008–2014	Succeeded by Trygve Slagsvold Vedum
Preceded by Lars Peder Brekk	Parliamentary Leader of the Centre Party; 2013–2014	Succeeded by Marit Arnstad
Preceded by N/A	Second Deputy Leader of the Centre Party; 2001–2008	Succeeded by Trygve Slagsvold Vedum
Civic offices
Preceded by Lars Sponheim	County Governor of Vestland; 2022–present	Incumbent
