= Trygve Slagsvold Vedum =

Norwegian politician (born 1978)

Trygve Slagsvold Vedum MP
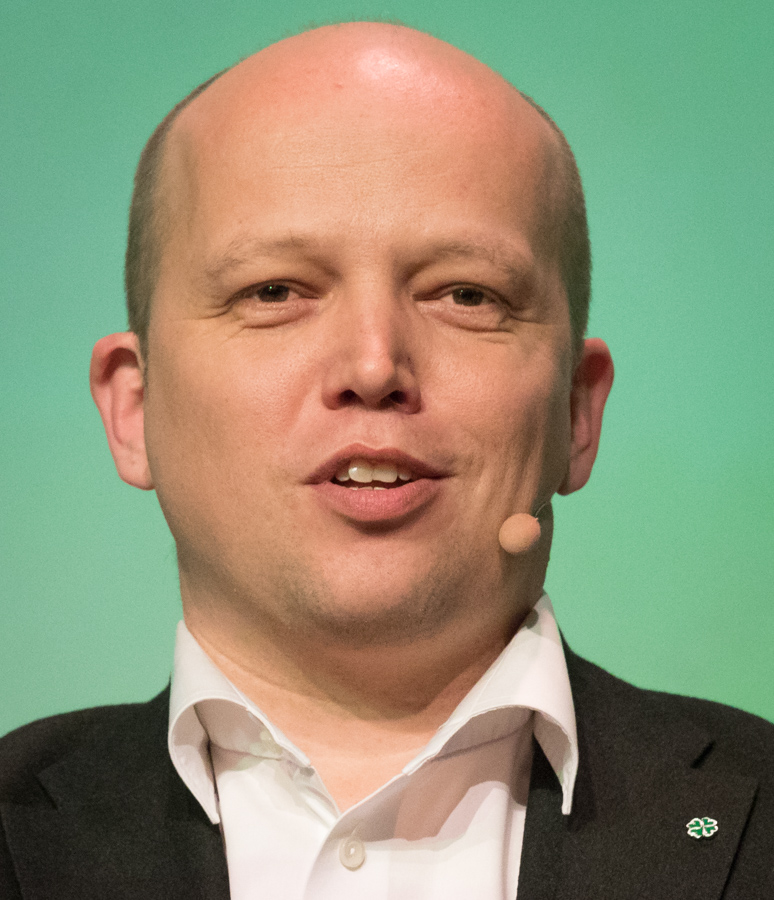
- Vedum in 2017

Minister of Finance
- In office 14 October 2021 – 4 February 2025
- Prime Minister: Jonas Gahr Støre
- Preceded by: Jan Tore Sanner
- Succeeded by: Jens Stoltenberg

Leader of the Centre Party
- Incumbent
- Assumed office 7 April 2014
- First Deputy: Ola Borten Moe; Bjørn Arild Gram
- Second Deputy: Anne Beathe Tvinnereim; Kjersti Toppe
- Preceded by: Liv Signe Navarsete

Minister of Agriculture and Food
- In office 18 June 2012 – 16 October 2013
- Prime Minister: Jens Stoltenberg
- Preceded by: Lars Peder Brekk
- Succeeded by: Sylvi Listhaug

Parliamentary Leader of the Centre Party
- In office 1 October 2009 – 18 June 2012
- Leader: Liv Signe Navarsete
- Preceded by: Rune J. Skjælaaen
- Succeeded by: Lars Peder Brekk

Member of the Norwegian Parliament
- Incumbent
- Assumed office 1 October 2005
- Deputy: Olov Grøtting; Per Martin Sandtrøen
- Constituency: Hedmark

Personal details
- Born: Trygve Magnus Slagsvold Vedum; 1 December 1978 (age 47) Hamar, Hedmark, Norway
- Party: Centre
- Spouse: Cathrine Wergeland
- Children: 2
- Education: Hedmark University College; University of Oslo

Military service
- Allegiance: Norway
- Branch/service: Norwegian Army

Trygve Magnus Slagsvold Vedum (born 1 December 1978) is a Norwegian politician and farmer who served as Minister of Finance between 2021 and 2025. A member of the Centre Party, which he has led since 2014, he has been a Member of Parliament (MP) for Hedmark since 2005. Vedum also served as Minister of Agriculture and Food from 2012 to 2013.

== Early life ==
Vedum was born in Hamar as a son of Trond Vidar Vedum, a lecturer in biology at Hedmark University College, and teacher Karen Sigrid Slagsvold. After finishing the lower secondary school in Romedal in 1994 he entered the three-year upper secondary education in natural resources management, with two years at Jønsberg and one year at Tomb. Following graduation, he studied sciences for one year at Hedmark University College, before enrolling at the University of Oslo in 1999 where he received a bachelor's degree in political science in 2002.

== Political career ==
=== Early career ===
He chaired the Centre Youth from 2002 to 2004, at the time also serving as central board member of the Centre Party. He was elected to Hedmark county council in 1999, serving until 2005. From 2004 to 2005 he also worked as an organizational advisor in the Centre Party and was a board-member of the organisations of Nei til Atomvåpen (No to Nuclear Weapons) and Nei til EU in the period 2005–2007.

=== Parliament ===
He was elected to the Parliament of Norway from Hedmark in 2005 and re-elected in 2009 and 2013. Vedum was initially in the Standing Committee on Local Government and Public Administration, then changed to the Standing Committee on Health and Care Services in 2008. In October 2008 he became deputy leader of the committee, as well as Second Deputy President of the Odelsting, and party whip. He was also a member of the Electoral Committee from 2005 to 2012, and from 2009 to 2012 the Standing Committee on Foreign Affairs and Defence and the Enlarged Committee on Foreign Affairs and Defence.

=== Minister of Agriculture and Food ===
On 18 June 2012, Vedum was appointed to the Stoltenberg's Second Cabinet to serve as Minister of Agriculture and Food. He lost his job after the cabinet fell following the 2013 election. He returned to Parliament, where he took a seat in the Standing Committee on Finance and Economic Affairs.

=== Party leader ===
In 2009, he became second deputy leader of the Centre Party, then party leader in 2014. At the time, he was the youngest ever Centre Party leader.

Vedum led the party into the 2017 election, with the party becoming a clear winner of the election with 10,3 percent of the vote. The party received their best results since the 1993 election. Despite this, there was no change of government. Vedum himself said one had to look back to the 1990s during the EU debate and the glory days of Per Borten's premiership to find equally good results.

After a lot of speculation, the party convention announced in June 2021 that Vedum would be the party's prime minister candidate for the 2021 election. His party gained 9 seats in Parliament and receiving 13,5 percent of the vote following the election on 13 September. His party had campaigned to end Erna Solberg's centralisation policies, and to form a Labour-Centre Party government, the latter to contrary wishes from Labour leader Jonas Gahr Støre.

Vedum subsequently opened to work with the Socialist Left Party in government, and along with the Labour Party, started pre-negotiations on 23 September. On 29 September, the Socialist Left Party withdrew from negotiations, notably citing lack of progress when it came to petroleum and welfare, among other policies as well. Vedum reassured that his party would still work with the Socialist Left if it would be relevant, and called for immediate negotiations to begin between the Centre Party and Labour Party. These negotiations began later that day. On 8 October, Støre and Vedum announced that the new government's platform would be presented on 13 October and that they were ready to form a government on 14 October.

Vedum was mentioned as a candidate for minister of local government, but was then mentioned as a candidate for minister of finance after Støre rejected to appoint Sigbjørn Gjelsvik to the position. This was due to the Labour Party preferring a Centre Party member from their leadership to hold the position, a position Gjelsvik did not hold.

On 30 January 2025, he announced that the Centre Party would be withdrawing from government following disagreements over the implementation of the EU's fourth energy package and thereby returning to opposition. Parliamentary leader Marit Arnstad added that the party would continue to support Jonas Gahr Støre as prime minister.

=== Minister of Finance ===
Vedum was eventually appointed minister of finance in Støre's Cabinet on 14 October 2021.

==== 2021 ====
Over the ensuing electricity price crisis, Vedum stated that he hoped to do something about as soon as possible, saying: "If we reduce the taxes on electricity, and there is something we can approve in the Storting". Vedum further announced he would freeze executive salaries in the state to avoid a paycheck in state-owned companies. Vedum expressed that there was no "miracle cure" for the electricity price crisis, and said that he couldn't promise measures that rapid cuts in people's electricity bills.

Vedum announced clear measures on taxes and fees to start already in 2022, despite a short deadline with the budget to be presented on 8 November. Of the measures, he said: "We will have a completely different distribution profile. If you earn less than NOK 750,000, you will find that the tax measures and the measures we take will make everyday life easier". A week before the revised budget being presented, Vedum announced that 1.2 billion NOK would be spent on closure threatened primary schools for every year starting in 2022. He did however warn that if a municipality decides to close a school, they would lose their grant for said school. On 8 November, Vedum presented the government's revised state budget.

On 7 December, with new COVID-19 measures being presented, Vedum announced that the compensation scheme would be reintroduced.

On 11 December, Vedum, alongside prime minister Jonas Gahr Støre and minister of petroleum and energy Marte Mjøs Persen, presented a security scheme to battle the rising electricity prices. However, this resulted in a large amount of criticism, as the bill wouldn't be applicable for individuals living in collectives, which is about 20% of the total population. Several have also pointed out that the bill would only make a small dent in the sky-rocketing bills, which had risen 5-10 times to their average prices then previous years by December.

==== 2022 ====
In early January 2022, Vedum reiterated that the state would pay for the dissolution of forced merged counties, this time regarding Troms og Finnmark. Later that month, Vedum and Støre announced that the electricity support would be increased from 55 to 80% until March. Vedum expressed that it was important that the scheme would affect "all wallets". Furthermore, he said that the government would put forward a proposition to the Storting regarding the adjustments.

Vedum put forward a new crisis package with further measures against COVID-19 to the Storting on 14 January. The package is worth 20,2 billion NOK and notably covers business, culture and volunteering, public transport, aviation and health and care. The package did however receive skepticism from the government's preferred working partner, the Socialist Left Party.

At a press conference on 27 February, Vedum announced that the government would be initiating sanctions against the Russian economy and political leadership. He also stated the government's goal is to pull the Norwegian Oil Fund completely out of the Russian market. With rising fuel prices following the Russian invasion of Ukraine, Vedum faced pressure from the Norwegian Automobile Federation, Norwegian Truck Federation and several of his own MPs to reduce fuel taxes. Vedum told TV2 that the fuel prices would be a topic at the government's budget conference, but also rejected the possibility of a compensation scheme for the rising fuel prices.

On 24 March, Vedum announced the nomination of Ida Wolden Bache to become governor of Norges Bank, after Jens Stoltenberg resigned as incoming governor in order to continue as NATO Secretary-General for another year. At the same time, he expressed understanding for his decision and praised Wolden Bache, stating that "we will get a good governor for Norges Bank in Wolden Bache". Norges Bank stated that Vedum would put forward the nomination for a six-year term, to be accepted at the State Council as soon as possible. Wolden Bache was formally appointed on 1 April.

In early May, Vedum sparked controversy when he claimed that Norwegian families' economy generally was going up and could afford more. His claim was criticised by the opposition and economic experts and professors. Progress Party leader Sylvi Listhaug remarked that Norwegian families could generally afford less. Vedum remained firm of the calculation and denied that he or the Ministry of Finance had tried to "add make-up" to it.

On 4 June, Vedum announced that he would tighten the tax rules regarding the use of private airplanes and properties. The burden of proof from the Tax Administration to the company in question and the owner; which would mean that one would need to show that i.e. a private plane would be used for coming business and not for private use.

In August, Vedum stated that less petroleum money should be used in 2023. This came after SSB announced new numbers that showed that the prices had risen with 6,8% when it came to travelling, fuel, alcohol free beverages and food products. On 27 August, Vedum announced that an electricity safety scheme would continue to be in place beyond March 2023, and that it would be the government's recommendation to the Storting. He stated: "When we adopted the safety scheme last autumn, the analyzes indicated that prices could normalize this summer. There is nothing to indicate that this will happen. Therefore, people can feel secure that we will have an safety scheme as long as we have these extraordinary times that we now have".

On 21 September, Vedum welcomed debate about the interest rate jumps, but declined the Norwegian Confederation of Trade Unions's economic chief, Roger Bjørnstad's demand to talk to the Governor of the Central Bank about the issue. He stated: "I strongly disagree with Bjørnstad that I should whisper anything in the central bank governor's ear. We must have order and clear rules of the game. We have to look at the long lines: such an informal management dialogue would not create stability. There must be a wall between Norges Bank and us as politicians in day-to-day management".

At an unexpected press conference held on 28 September, Vedum and prime minister Jonas Gahr Støre announced that the government would be taking in 33 billion NOK from the power producers and aquaculture industries. The announcement was heavily criticised and the aquaculture industry went out against the possibility of a basic interest tax for aquaculture and expressed that it would "shut off the lights along the coast".

On 6 October, Vedum presented the government's state budget for 2023.

Vedum met his European counterparts from the EU and EFTA countries in Brussels on 8 November. He also met with European Commissioner for Financial Stability Mairead McGuinness and European Commissioner for Economy Paolo Gentiloni, where he demanded changes in the EU rules for state aid and the practice of differentiated employer's contribution. He reasoned that the rules specifically effected companies in Northern Norway.

==== 2023 ====
In January 2023, Vedum visited Brussels to convince EFTA to accept Norway's interpretation of state aid rules for so-called companies in difficulty, which they later accepted. Vedum called the decision "an important breakthrough". He also said that he would inform the Norwegian Tax Administration about the decision and instruct them to go through tax cases again with the new interpretation as basis.

In February, prime minister Jonas Gahr Støre, accompanied by Vedum and energy minister Terje Aasland, announced that the electricity support scheme would be expanded until 2024. Vedum stated that the government's goal was to stabilise electricity prices. He also stated that the government would put down a commission to look into how the electricity market will handle it, with their findings to be delivered on 15 October.

Vedum faced criticism in May for his announcement of spending 373 billion NOK of the Oil Fund for the revised state budget. The opposition expressed concerns over the implications for the rising interest rates, while economists said that the action could result in a rise for the interest rate, but that it seemed reasonable and likely wouldn't result in inflation. The Socialist Left Party praised the action, and that it would help in strengthening welfare.

In August, Vedum, alongside energy minister Terje Aasland and prime minister Jonas Gahr Støre announced that the government would move in for electrification of the Melkøya power plant. The move would ensure the plant to stay operational until at least 2040. Vedum faced criticism from local party chapters in Northern Norway over the decision.

Vedum presented the government's state budget for 2024 on 6 October. Several of the government's outlined priorities and cuts were criticised by the opposition parties, which included tax reliefs, the interest rate, rise in expenses and the environment among other things.

Vedum led the negotiations for the 2024 state budget together with the Labour Party and parliament partner, the Socialist Left Party. The negotiations began on 13 November and wrapped on 3 December. He called the result a "safe and responsible" budget which had been adapted to the exceptional circumstances the country was facing.

==== 2024 ====
In January, Vedum was criticised by the Socialist Left Party following the release of a report by Statistics Norway which revealed that 10% of the country's richest people earned more than 50% of the national net worth. They further asked the government to do more about inequality in wealth among citizens, which Vedum claimed they were doing, and cited other measures like reallocating funds to families, pensioners, kindergartens and increasing student support as per the government's budget deal with the party.

Vedum and justice minister Emilie Mehl announced a government plan in March to increase funding to the police for them to combat criminal networks dealing in economic crimes and theft of other valuables.

Alongside prime minister Jonas Gahr Støre and defence minister Bjørn Arild Gram, Vedum announced in April that the government would be spending 600 billion NOK in the Norwegian Army in the next twelve years as part of their long term plan for the army. The plan would put much more emphasis on conscription, the Navy, Army and Home Guard.

In September, he announced that the government would be increasing the threshold for exemption cards for young people from 70 000 to 100 000 NOK, which he explained would allow young people to work longer before requiring to pay taxes. He further explained that this would allow people to spare up to 6 800 NOK in reduced taxes. The move was welcomed by students and some opposition parties like the Red and Socialist Left parties.

Vedum presented the state budget for 2025 on 7 October, which notably included: a potential cut in interest rates, a reduction of refugee quotas, 6.8 billion NOK to municipalities, 96.1 billion NOK to transport projects and an increase in climate quotas, among other things. The budget was negatively received by the opposition, notably by the Socialist Left, Red and Conservative parties, who all argued that the budget would not help to improve the economy in the longterm.

In late October, Vedum defended justice minister Emilie Mehl's comments on the closure of several upper secondary schools in Innlandet county and blamed Erna Solberg and the Conservative Party for pushing to centralise schools. Solberg in turn criticised Vedum for not paying attention to the sinking population numbers in the county.

He caused internal division over the government's approach to the gender debate in November when he expressed support for the Christian Democrats leader Dag Inge Ulstein's views on the topic and that there were only two genders. Vedum asserted that this was "a biological fact" and that it would place a big burden on children to question their gender. Culture minister Lubna Jaffery on the other hand reiterated her party's stance on inclusion and acknowledging a third gender, while also calling the debate "imported from the United States" and the issue "made larger than necessary".

==== 2025 ====
Following the Centre Party's withdrawal from government, he was succeeded by former Prime Minister Jens Stoltenberg on 4 February 2025.

== Other ==
Vedum has also been a deputy board member of Folk og Forsvar (1999–2000) and a board member of Nei til atomvåpen (2005–2007), Nei til EU (2005–2007), Norway's Contact Committee for Immigrants and the Authorities (2006–) and Menighetssøsterhjemmet (2007–2009).

He is also a member of the Ilseng Vel organisation, which advocates against school closures in Stange Municipality, his local community.

Vedum participated in the first season of the Norwegian equivalent of The Masked Singer, Maskorama, disguised as The Scarecrow.

He made a guest appearance in the final of Farmen 2022.

== Personal life ==
He is the son of teacher and children's book author Trond Vidar Vedum (1946–) and teacher Karen Sigrid Slagsvold (1949–). He is married to Cathrine Wergeland and has two children. He also likes dancing.

=== Health ===
At the party convention in March 2023, Vedum revealed that he had been diagnosed with multiple sclerosis in 2020, but went through treatment and was stabilised by 2021.

== Bibliography ==
- Nær folk (2021; non-fiction), co-authored by Jan Bøhler

Political offices
Preceded by Lars Peder Brekk	Minister of Agriculture and Food; 2012–2013	Succeeded by Sylvi Listhaug
Preceded by Jan Tore Sanner	Minister of Finance; 2021–2025	Succeeded by Jens Stoltenberg
Party political offices
Preceded by Liv Signe Navarsete	Leader of the Centre Party; 2014–present	Incumbent
Preceded by Liv Signe Navarsete	Second Deputy Leader of the Centre Party; 2009–2014	Succeeded by Anne Beathe Tvinnereim
