= Magnhild Meltveit Kleppa =

Norwegian politician

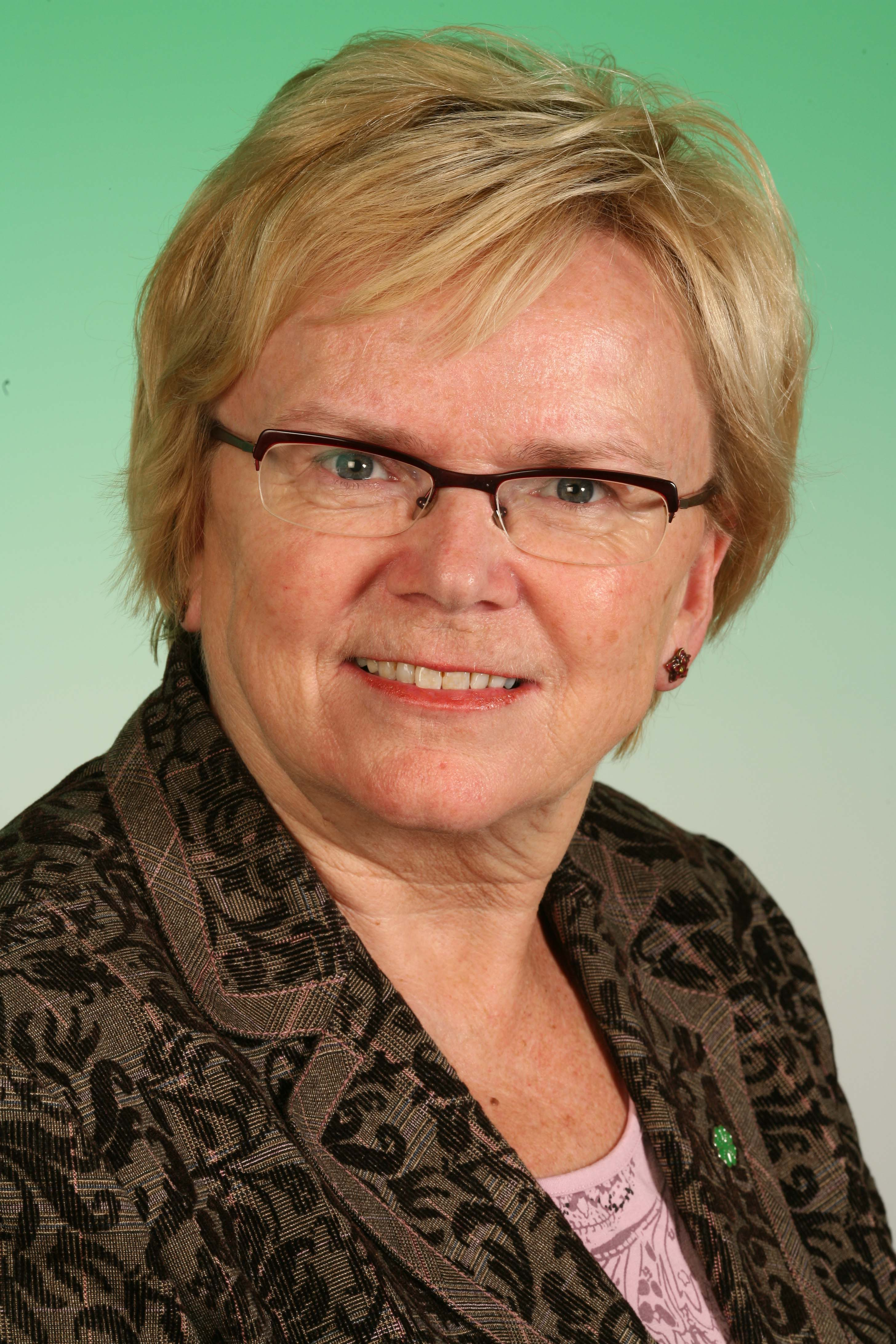
- Kleppa in November 2006

Governor of Rogaland
- In office 1 November 2013 – 21 June 2019
- Monarch: Harald V
- Prime Minister: Erna Solberg
- Preceded by: Tora Aasland
- Succeeded by: Lone Merethe Solheim (acting governor for Bent Høie)

Minister of Transport and Communications
- In office 20 October 2009 – 18 June 2012
- Prime Minister: Jens Stoltenberg
- Preceded by: Liv Signe Navarsete
- Succeeded by: Marit Arnstad

Minister of Local Government
- In office 21 September 2007 – 20 October 2009
- Prime Minister: Jens Stoltenberg
- Preceded by: Åslaug Haga
- Succeeded by: Liv Signe Navarsete

Minister of Social Affairs
- In office 17 October 1997 – 17 March 2000
- Prime Minister: Kjell Magne Bondevik
- Preceded by: Hill-Marta Solberg
- Succeeded by: Guri Ingebrigtsen

Personal details
- Born: 12 November 1948 (age 77) Fister, Rogaland, Norway
- Party: Centre
- Education: Kristiansand lærerskole Stavanger lærerskole

Magnhild Meltveit Kleppa (born 12 November 1948 in Fister, Norway) is a Norwegian politician for the Centre Party.

Kleppa is educated as a teacher at Kristiansand Teacher Training College in 1970. She worked as a teacher from 1967 to 1992. She was a member of the municipal council of Hjelmeland Municipality during the 1980s and a member of the Norwegian Parliament from 1993 until 2013. She then served as Governor of Rogaland County from 2013 to 2019.

== Political career ==
She was elected to the Parliament of Norway for the first time in 1993, and has been reelected four times, lastly in 2009. She did not seek reelection in the 2013 Norwegian parliamentary election. Her political advisor is fellow Centre Party member Sigrid Brattabø Handegard.

She was the Minister of Social Affairs from 17 Oct 1997 until 17 March 2000. From 17 October 2005 until 21 September 2007, she was the parliamentary leader for the Centre Party. She was appointed Norwegian Minister of Local Government and Regional Development on 21 September 2007, a post she held until 20 October 2009 when she swapped departments and became Minister of Transport and Communications. She continued in that role until 18 June 2012. On 1 November 2013, she became the County Governor of Rogaland. She retired in 2019 after having originally stated she was retiring in November 2018.

Government offices
Preceded by Tora Aasland	County Governor of Rogaland; 2013–2019	Succeeded by Lone Merethe Solheim (Acting for Bent Høie)
Political offices
Preceded by Liv Signe Navarsete	Norwegian Minister of Transport and Communications; 2009–2012	Succeeded by Marit Arnstad
Preceded by Åslaug Haga	Norwegian Minister of Local Government and Regional Development; 2007–2009	Succeeded by Liv Signe Navarsete
Preceded by Hill-Marta Solberg	Norwegian Minister of Social Affairs; 1997–2000	Succeeded by Guri Ingebrigtsen
