= Standing Committee on Business and Industry =

The Standing Committee on Business and Industry (Norwegian: Næringskomiteen) is a standing committee of the Parliament of Norway. It is responsible for policies relating to business, industry, trade, shipping, state ownership policy, competition and price policy, agriculture, food policy, fisheries, whaling and aquaculture. It corresponds to the Ministry of Trade and Industry, the Ministry of Agriculture and Food and the Ministry of Fisheries and Coastal Affairs. The committee has 14 members and is chaired by Marit Arnstad of the Centre Party.

== Members 2013–17 ==
! Representative !! Party !! Position |- |Marit Arnstad || Centre || Chair |- |Øyvind Korsberg || Progress || First deputy chair |- |Gunnar Gundersen || Conservative || Second deputy chair |- |Frank Bakke-Jensen || Conservative || |- |Else-May Botten || Labour|| |- |Pål Farstad || Liberal || |- |Ingunn Foss || Conservative || |- |Ingrid Heggø || Labour || |- |Line Henriette Hjemdal || Christian Democratic || |- |Morten Ørsal Johansen || Progress || |- |Odd Omland || Labour|| |- |Jørund Rytman || Progress || |- |Knut Storberget || Labour || |- |Ove Bernt Trellevik || Conservative || |}
