= Odd Roger Enoksen =

Norwegian politician (born 1954)

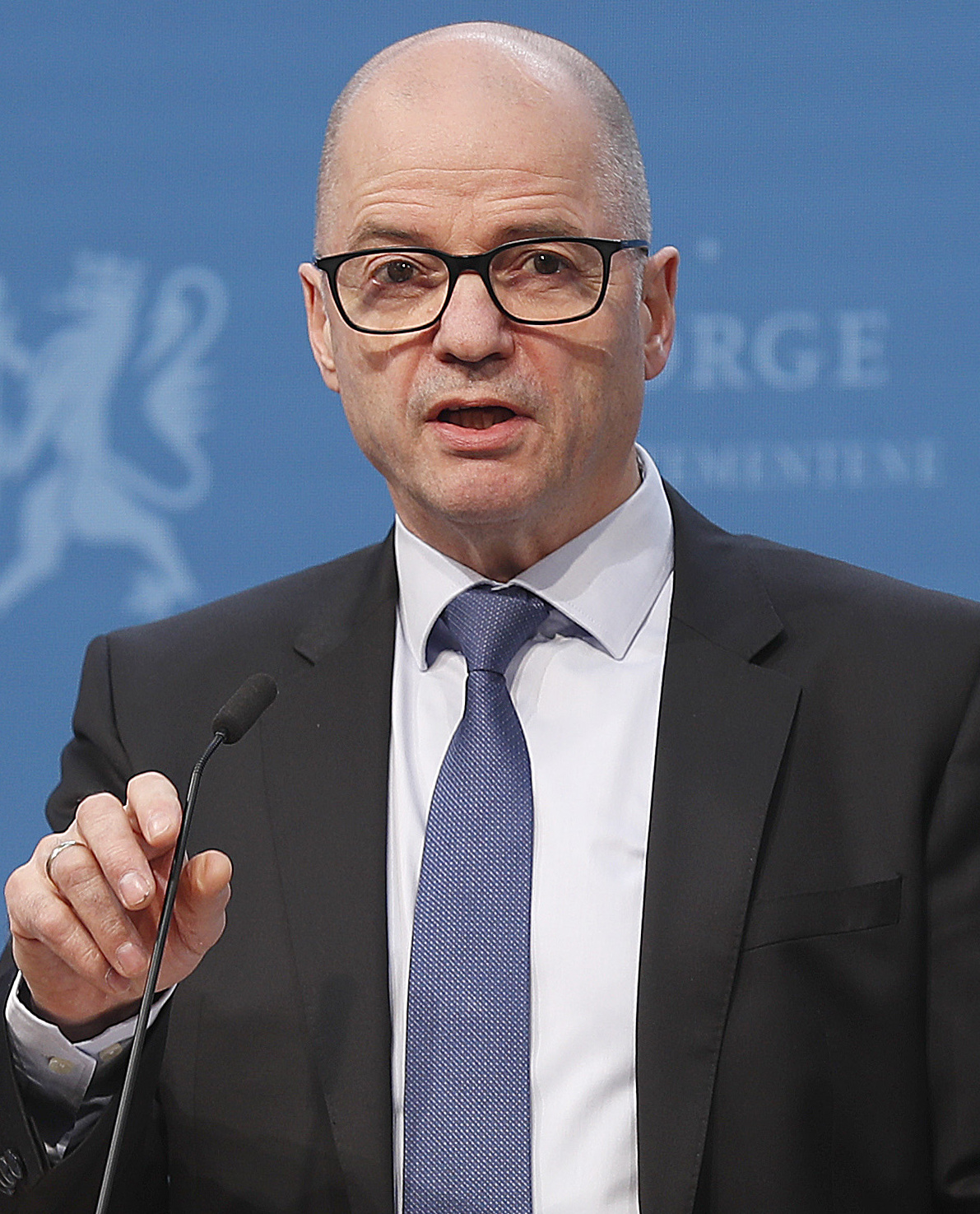
- Enoksen in 2022

Minister of Defence
- In office 14 October 2021 – 12 April 2022
- Prime Minister: Jonas Gahr Støre
- Preceded by: Frank Bakke-Jensen
- Succeeded by: Bjørn Arild Gram

Minister of Petroleum and Energy
- In office 17 October 2005 – 21 September 2007
- Prime Minister: Jens Stoltenberg
- Preceded by: Thorhild Widvey
- Succeeded by: Åslaug Haga

Deputy to the Prime Minister of Norway
- In office 8 October 1999 – 17 March 2000
- Prime Minister: Kjell Magne Bondevik
- Preceded by: Anne Enger
- Succeeded by: Post abolished

Minister of Local Government
- In office 16 March 1999 – 17 March 2000
- Prime Minister: Kjell Magne Bondevik
- Preceded by: Ragnhild Q. Haarstad
- Succeeded by: Sylvia Brustad

Leader of the Centre Party
- In office 14 March 1999 – 25 March 2003
- Preceded by: Anne Enger
- Succeeded by: Åslaug Haga

Member of the Storting
- In office 1 October 1993 – 30 September 2005
- Deputy: Inga Kvalbukt
- Constituency: Nordland

Deputy Member of the Storting
- In office 1 October 1989 – 30 September 1993
- Constituency: Nordland

Personal details
- Born: 25 September 1954 (age 72) Å, Andøy, Nordland, Norway
- Party: Centre

Odd Roger Enoksen (born 25 September 1954 in Å, Andøy) is a Norwegian politician representing the Norwegian Centre Party. He served as minister of defence from 2021 to 2022. He was also leader of the Centre Party from 1999 to 2003. Further, he served as minister of local government and deputy to the prime minister from 1999 to 2000, and minister of petroleum and energy from 2005 to 2007.

== Biography ==
=== Education ===
Having an agronomist education, Enoksen previously worked as a farmer, as well as running a business for peat products.

=== Parliament ===
He was first elected as deputy representative to the Storting in 1989, after a career in local politics. He was elected ordinary representative to the Storting from 1993 until 2005.

=== Minister of Local Government ===
Following a cabinet reshuffle on 16 March 1999, Enoksen was appointed Minister of Local Government and Regional Development in Kjell Magne Bondevik's first cabinet. On 8 October, he was also appointed deputy to the prime minister. He held both positions until 17 March 2000, when the government resigned following issues of gas power stations.

=== Party leader ===
Enoksen became deputy leader of his party in 1997, and following the retirement of Anne Enger Lahnstein in 1999, he became party leader. Åslaug Haga replaced him in 2003.

=== Minister of Petroleum and Energy ===
When the Red-Green Coalition in 2005 formed the first majority government in Norway since 1985, Enoksen became the Minister of Petroleum and Energy. He held the position until 2007 when he left Jens Stoltenberg's Cabinet and was replaced by Åslaug Haga. He said he wanted to focus on his family as a main reason for his departure.

=== Minister of Defence ===
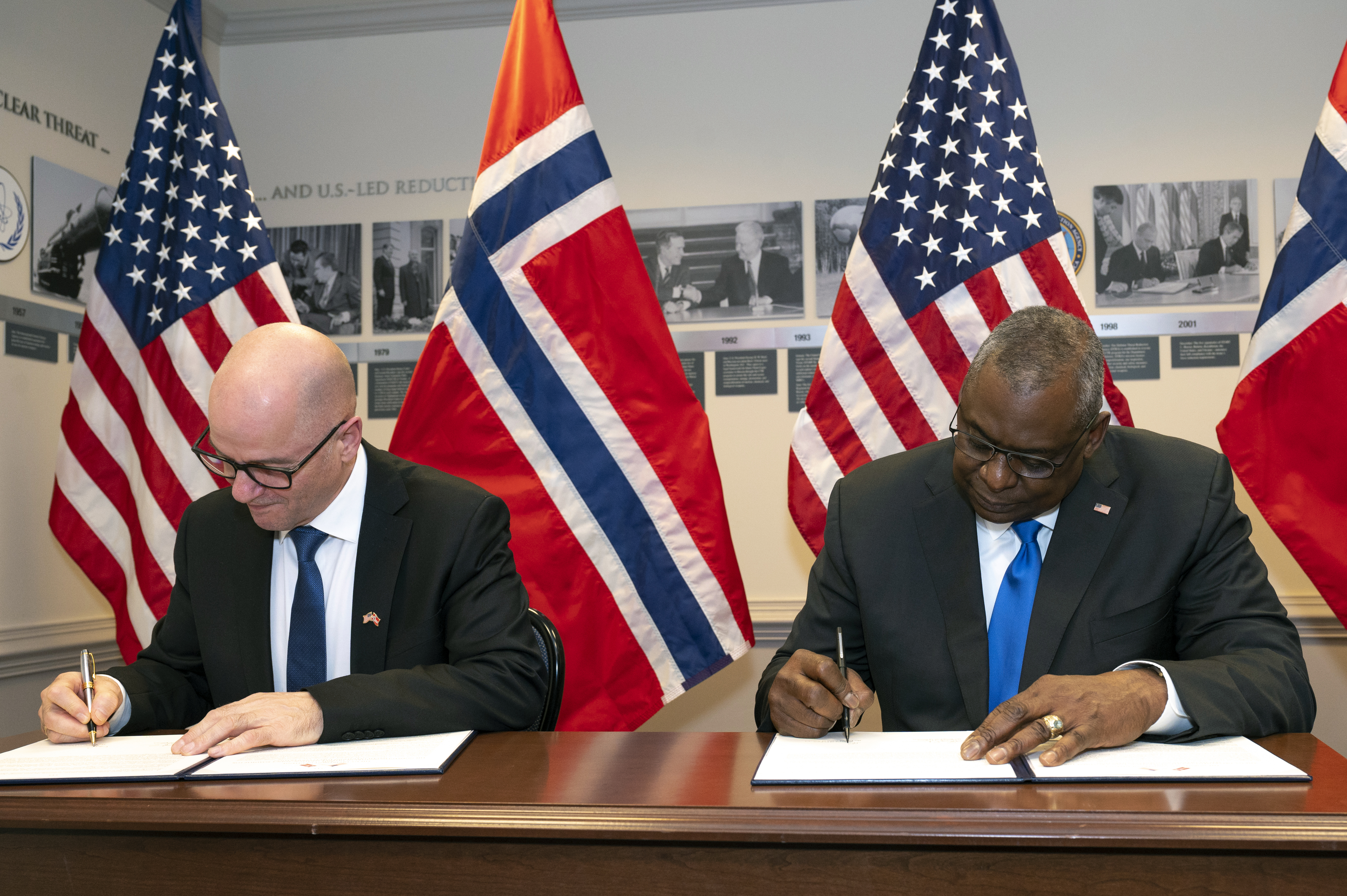
Enoksen signs an agreement increasing cooperation between US and Norwegian Special Operations Forces with US Secretary of Defense Lloyd Austin in Washington in 2021

On 14 October 2021, Enoksen was appointed minister of defence in Støre's Cabinet.

Upon assuming office, Enoksen was faced with the issue of his native hometown, Andøya's Air Station being closed down and fighter jets moved to Evenes Air Station. However, further issues at the latter air station were also revealed, notably de-icing pollution and a higher price cost for the move long term.

Enoksen defended Støre's prospect of sending observers to the summit on a nuclear ban in Vienna in early 2022, saying that Norway would "listen to what goes on within the treaty work", and specified it was in no way a breach of NATO's view. He also acknowledged that Norway's action could be faced with criticism within NATO.

After NATO expelled several Russian diplomats alleged to be spies, Enoksen expressed hope to mend relations with Russia. He further stressed the importance of Norway having a regional role in the north, but also manding the relations with Russia and having dialog. Enoksen also emphasised that the United States would continue to be a close ally and said "there should be no doubt" about it.

Enoksen attended a NATO Ministers of Defence summit between 21 and 22 October in Brussels. Following the meeting, he confirmed that other member states expressed concern that other countries might follow Norway's lead. He also said that some members expressed support for Norway's lead. Despite Enoksen reassuring that Norway's plan to send observers wouldn't breach NATO's view on a nuclear ban, the Conservative Party's Ine Eriksen Søreide, reiterated the contrary that it would in fact do exactly that.

Ahead of the revised state budget, Enoksen announced that 50 million NOK would be spent on bettering living conditions in living quarters within the Army. He did however note that it was up to the Chief of Defence to decide what the money would be spent on.

On 16 November, Enoksen met U. S. Secretary of Defense Lloyd Austin at The Pentagon, where they discussed the security situation in the North. They also signed a road map for further development cooperation between their armed forces. Enoksen expressed to the press that they were to be expecting that Russia would continue to test and develop weapon systems up North.

In early December, after making a statement where he called the immigration situation at the Polish-Belarusian border for "not acceptable use of resources", Enoksen was criticised by the Conservative Party's defence policy spokesperson Hårek Elvenes. He questioned Enoksen if the government took a different stance then the European Union, United States and an allied country. Enoksen emphasised: "Norway is, of course, behind our allies. But we as a nation must also have our own opinion on the ways in which our allies react, and whether this is within what we think is acceptable or not". He also stressed that his statement was related to one specific event.

A new Defence Commission was set up on 17 December to determine the Norwegian Army's next long term plan for the 2025–2028 period. Of why a new commission was needed, Enoksen said: "These are complex, complicated and new challenges we face as a society". He also stated that "we are facing a completely new security policy situation".

After the Incidents at Sea treaty had been updated and signed, Enoksen commented in a press release: "This is an important contribution to security and predictability at a time when military activity in our immediate areas is changing". The treaty is intended to prevent dangerous incidents at sea and in the air.

In response to a written question from Red Party leader Bjørnar Moxnes in January 2022, regarding if NATO had asked Norway to move troops to the Baltic states or near the Russian border; Enoksen responded: "The Armed Forces operates at home and abroad together with allies to protect Norwegian security. The Armed Forces also has forces that are on domestic preparedness and in readiness for NATO. We therefore follow the situation closely". He went on to say: "NATO is constantly monitoring Russia's forces building near Ukraine, and is considering, together with member states, the need to adapt allied presence, including in Lithuania". Moxnes' question came in light of Denmark announcing that they would deploy four fighter jets and one frigate to patrol near the Baltic states.

In a joint press conference with foreign minister Anniken Huitfeldt on 14 January, Enoksen states that Europe, Norway and Ukraine were in a serious situation. He said there were continuous reason to be concerned about military force in Ukraine, while also noting that it was Russia's responsibility to deescalate. Enoksen also said that the military exercise Cold Response would still take place as planned, saying: "From the Norwegian side, it is important to maintain a non-escalating profile and that we are open and clear about our own military activity". He added that Russia would be notified about the exercise as they traditionally have.

Enoksen cancelled his scheduled appearance at a security conference in Munich lasting from 18–20 February, travelling back to Norway in order to be "more available to make decisions as the situation stands" regarding Ukraine. He also stated that "there are no good signs right now" regarding Russia. He did also express hope that Russia was still interested in dialog and to have meetings.

Enoksen didn't rule out the possibility of having to deploy Norwegian soldiers to neighbouring countries of Ukraine, if NATO deems it necessary. He also stated that they are sending more soldiers to Lithuania, where Norway already has previously deployed them.

At a press conference on 27 February, Enoksen announced that Ukraine specifically requested helmets and protective vests to be sent, and added that other requests would be considered consecutively. Earlier the same day, Enoksen was present at Oslo Gardermoen Airport to oversee the deployment of Norwegian troops on a NATO mission to Lithuania.

Enoksen had to postpone a visit to Sweden to meet with his Swedish counterpart, Peter Hultqvist, on 8 and 9 March, after having tested positive for COVID-19.

Enoksen announced on 16 March that NATO's defence ministers had agreed on a summit that NATO should rearm further. He also announced that the Norwegian government would put forward a plan to strengthen the Army by Friday that week.

In early April, Hilde Lengali, a former deputy leader of the Nordland Centre Party, delivered a formal complaint against Enoksen, alleging that he had inappropriately touched her and commented on her look about 20 years prior. Enoksen responded saying that he had no recollections of said events with the exception of the mentioned comment. He did however apologise for what happened.

Despite his apology to Lengali, another woman, who remained anonymous, came forward with a similar story about a relationship with Enoksen when he was petroleum and energy minister. In the early hours of 9 April, Enoksen announced that he had asked to resign as defence minister. Later the same day, Prime Minister Jonas Gahr Støre announced that he had accepted Enoksen's resignation. He left his position on 12 April, and was succeeded by Bjørn Arild Gram.

=== Other ===
Since 2005 Enoksen has been the Managing Director of Andøya Rocket Range.

Party political offices
Preceded by Anne Enger Lahnstein	Leader of the Centre Party; 1999–2003	Succeeded by Åslaug Haga
Political offices
Preceded by Ragnhild Haarstad	Minister of Local Government and Regional Development; 1999–2000	Succeeded by Sylvia Brustad
Preceded by Thorhild Widvey	Minister of Petroleum and Energy; 2005–2007	Succeeded by Åslaug Haga
Preceded by Frank Bakke-Jensen	Minister of Defence; 2021–2022	Succeeded by Bjørn Arild Gram
