= Støre cabinet =

Government of Norway since 2021

Støre Cabinet
- Cabinet of Norway
- Incumbent
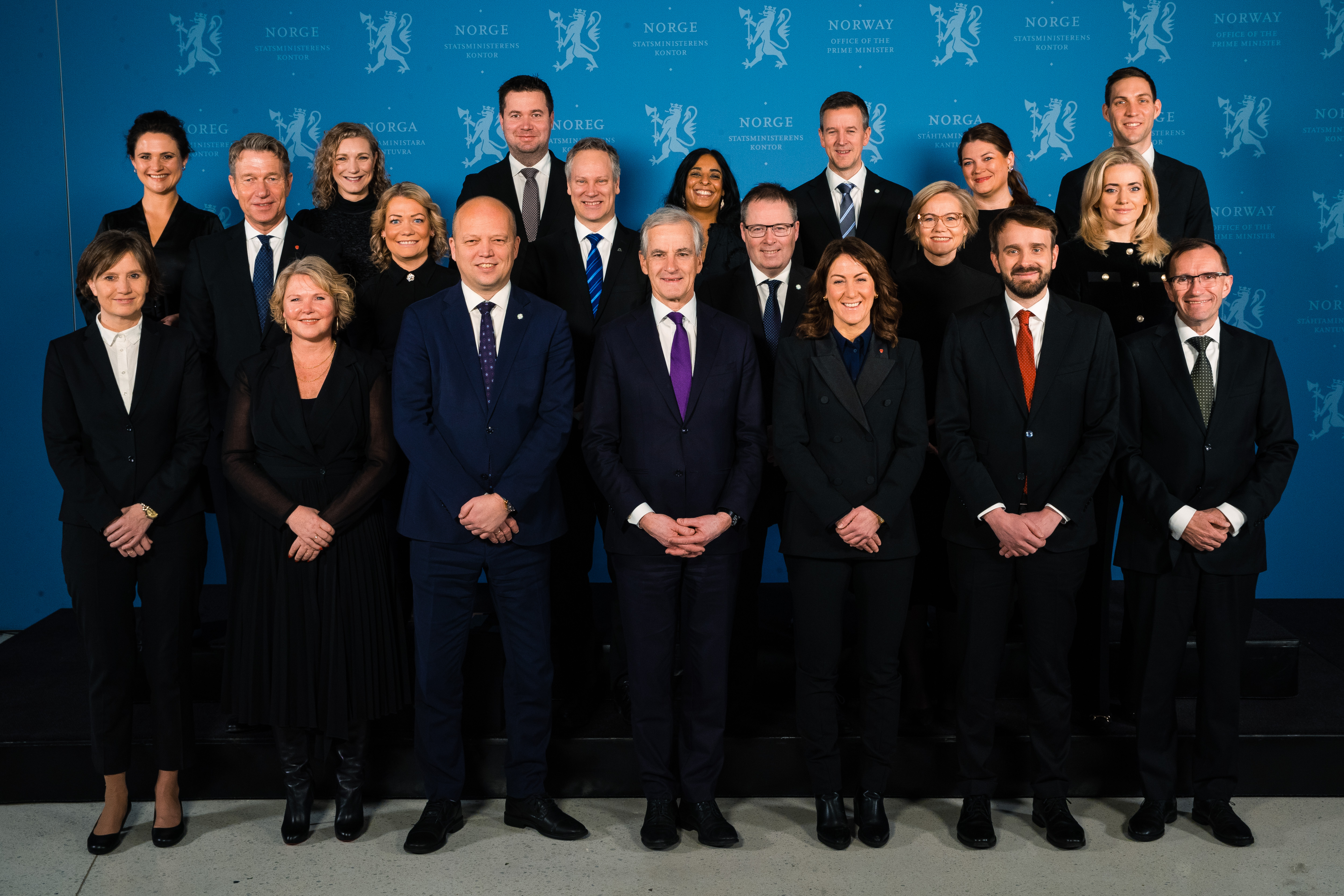
- The cabinet in December 2023
- Date formed: 14 October 2021

People and organisations
- King: Harald V Haakon VIII
- Prime Minister: Jonas Gahr Støre
- No. of ministers: 20
- Member parties: Labour Party; Centre Party (2021–2025)
- Status in legislature: Coalition (minority) (2021–2025); Minority (2025–) (Note: With passive support from the Socialist Left Party and Centre Party following the Centre Party's withdrawal from the coalition. Following the 2025 election, with confidence and supply from the Centre Party, Socialist Left Party, Red Party and Green Party.)
- Opposition parties: Conservative Party; Christian Democratic Party; Green Party (2021–2025); Liberal Party; Patient Focus (2021–2025); Progress Party; Red Party (2021–2025); Socialist Left Party (2021–2025)
- Opposition leader: Erna Solberg (2021–2025); Sylvi Listhaug (2025–)

History
- Incoming formation: 2021 election
- Elections: 2021; 2025
- Legislature terms: 2021–2025; 2025–2029
- Predecessor: Solberg Cabinet

The Støre Cabinet is the incumbent government of the Kingdom of Norway, headed by Labour Party leader Jonas Gahr Støre as Prime Minister. The government was appointed by King Harald V on 14 October 2021, following the parliamentary election on 13 September, consisting of the Labour Party (Ap) and the Centre Party (Sp) as a minority government. On 30 January 2025, the Centre Party withdrew from government over disagreements over the implementation of three directives in the European Union's fourth energy package. The one-party minority cabinet won re-election at the 2025 parliamentary election.

== Members ==
On 14 October 2021, Jonas Gahr Støre's cabinet ministers were appointed by King Harald V. The cabinet consists of 19 ministers; one fewer than the previous Solberg cabinet. It had eleven ministers from Labour and eight from Centre, reflecting the parties' numerical strength in Parliament. The Labour Party took over the Centre Party's remaining eight positions upon the latter party's withdrawal from the coalition government in February 2025.

At appointment the cabinet consisted of ten women and nine men, two of whom (Brenna and Vestre) survived the 2011 Norway attacks. Aged 28, Emilie Enger Mehl became the youngest person to serve as the minister of justice in the Norwegian government. This was also the third time in Norwegian history that a cabinet had a women majority. The coalition is politically centre-left.

A cabinet reshuffle was held on 16 October 2023. The Minister of Digitalisation position was re-established, thereby increasing the number of ministers to 20.

Støre reshuffled his cabinet again on 11 September 2026.

Portfolio	Minister	Took office	Left office	Party
Prime Minister	Jonas Gahr Støre	14 October 2021	Incumbent	Labour
Minister of Finance	Trygve Slagsvold Vedum	14 October 2021	4 February 2025	Centre
Minister of Finance	Jens Stoltenberg	4 February 2025	Incumbent	Labour
Minister of Labour and Social Inclusion	Hadia Tajik	14 October 2021	4 March 2022	Labour
Minister of Labour and Social Inclusion	Marte Mjøs Persen	7 March 2022	16 October 2023	Labour
Minister of Labour and Social Inclusion	Tonje Brenna	16 October 2023	16 September 2025	Labour
Minister of Labour and Social Inclusion	Kjersti Stenseng	16 September 2025	Incumbent	Labour
Minister of Research and Higher Education	Ola Borten Moe	14 October 2021	4 August 2023	Centre
Minister of Research and Higher Education	Sandra Borch	4 August 2023	23 January 2024	Centre
Minister of Research and Higher Education	Oddmund Løkensgard Hoel	23 January 2024	4 February 2025	Centre
Minister of Research and Higher Education	Sigrun Gjerløw Aasland	4 February 2025	11 September 2026	Labour
Minister of Research and Higher Education	Eileen Fugelsnes	11 September 2026	Incumbent	Labour
Minister of Fisheries and Ocean Policy	Bjørnar Skjæran	14 October 2021	16 October 2023	Labour
Minister of Fisheries and Ocean Policy	Cecilie Myrseth	16 October 2023	19 April 2024	Labour
Minister of Fisheries and Ocean Policy	Marianne Sivertsen Næss	19 April 2024	Incumbent	Labour
Minister of International Development	Anne Beathe Tvinnereim	14 October 2021	4 February 2025	Centre
Minister of International Development	Åsmund Grøver Aukrust	4 February 2025	Incumbent	Labour
Minister of Foreign Affairs	Anniken Huitfeldt	14 October 2021	16 October 2023	Labour
Minister of Foreign Affairs	Espen Barth Eide	16 October 2023	Incumbent	Labour
Minister of Defence	Odd Roger Enoksen	14 October 2021	12 April 2022	Centre
Minister of Defence	Bjørn Arild Gram	12 April 2022	4 February 2025	Centre
Minister of Defence	Tore O. Sandvik	4 February 2025	Incumbent	Labour
Minister of Climate and the Environment	Espen Barth Eide	14 October 2021	16 October 2023	Labour
Minister of Climate and the Environment	Andreas Bjelland Eriksen	16 October 2023	11 September 2026	Labour
Minister of Climate and the Environment	Sigrun Gjerløw Aasland	11 September 2026	Incumbent	Labour
Minister of Children and Families	Kjersti Toppe	14 October 2021	4 February 2025	Centre
Minister of Children and Families	Lene Vågslid	4 February 2025	Incumbent	Labour
Minister of Local Government and Regional Development	Bjørn Arild Gram	14 October 2021	12 April 2022	Centre
Minister of Local Government and Regional Development	Sigbjørn Gjelsvik	12 April 2022	16 October 2023	Centre
Minister of Local Government and Regional Development	Erling Sande	16 October 2023	4 February 2025	Centre
Minister of Local Government and Regional Development	Kjersti Stenseng	4 February 2025	16 September 2025	Labour
Minister of Local Government and Regional Development	Bjørnar Skjæran	16 September 2025	Incumbent	Labour
Minister of Transport	Jon-Ivar Nygård	14 October 2021	11 September 2026	Labour
Minister of Transport	Kamzy Gunaratnam	11 September 2026	Incumbent	Labour
Minister of Energy (Note: Minister of Petroleum and Energy until 1 January 2024.)	Marte Mjøs Persen	14 October 2021	7 March 2022	Labour
Minister of Energy	Terje Aasland	7 March 2022	Incumbent	Labour
Minister of Health and Care Services	Ingvild Kjerkol	14 October 2021	19 April 2024	Labour
Minister of Health and Care Services	Jan Christian Vestre	19 April 2024	Incumbent	Labour
Minister of Culture and Equality	Anette Trettebergstuen	14 October 2021	28 June 2023	Labour
Minister of Culture and Equality	Lubna Jaffery	28 June 2023	Incumbent	Labour
Minister of Trade and Industry	Jan Christian Vestre	14 October 2021	19 April 2024	Labour
Minister of Trade and Industry	Cecilie Myrseth	19 April 2024	Incumbent	Labour
Minister of Education	Tonje Brenna	14 October 2021	16 October 2023	Labour
Minister of Education	Kari Nessa Nordtun	16 October 2023	Incumbent	Labour
Minister of Agriculture and Food	Sandra Borch	14 October 2021	4 August 2023	Centre
Minister of Agriculture and Food	Geir Pollestad	4 August 2023	4 February 2025	Centre
Minister of Agriculture and Food	Nils Kristen Sandtrøen	4 February 2025	Incumbent	Labour
Minister of Justice and Public Security	Emilie Enger Mehl	14 October 2021	4 February 2025	Centre
Minister of Justice and Public Security	Astri Aas-Hansen	4 February 2025	Incumbent	Labour
Minister of Digitalisation and Public Governance	Karianne Tung	16 October 2023	11 September 2026	Labour
Minister of Digitalisation and Public Governance	Torgeir Micaelsen	11 September 2026	Incumbent	Labour

== Scandals ==
Throughout its tenure, the Støre Cabinet has been marred by scandals that first began in 2022.

=== Hadia Tajik ===
In an 18 February 2022 post on her Facebook page, Tajik accused Aftenposten for wanting to make a scandal out of her usage of a parliamentary apartment in 2019. She said that Aftenposten had forced her to admit that she misused the system for three months in 2019 or openly discuss her security situation, the latter which she refused to discuss. Trine Eilertsen, the editor of Aftenposten, said in response that they had tried to get an interview with Tajik since 31 January, but Tajik had wished to give only answers in writing.

In the following weeks, it was also revealed that Tajik had been avoiding tax on a fringe benefit by having had a rental contract for an apartment in Rogaland in 2006, but never used or paid for it as she was at the time using a government apartment in Oslo. Both media analysts and legal experts concluded that the avoidance would count as both cheating and tax fraud, with calls for her to resign quickly following. Tajik ultimately announced her resignation on 2 March, formally doing so two days later. She was succeeded by petroleum and energy minister Marte Mjøs Persen on 7 March.

=== Odd Roger Enoksen ===
In early April, Hilde Lengali a former deputy leader of the Nordland Centre Party, delivered a formal complaint against Enoksen, alleging that he had inappropriately touched her and commented on her look about 20 years prior. Enoksen responded saying that he had no recollections of said events with the exception of the mentioned comment. He did however issue an apology for what happened. Despite his apology to Lengali, another woman, who remained anonymous, came forward with a similar story about a relationship with Enoksen when he was petroleum and energy minister. In the early hours of 9 April, Enoksen announced that he had asked to resign as defence minister. Later the same day, Prime Minister Jonas Gahr Støre announced that he had accepted Enoksen's resignation. Enoksen left his position on 12 April, and was succeeded by local government minister Bjørn Arild Gram.

=== Tonje Brenna ===
In June 2023, Verdens Gang revealed that Brenna had approved in May that a close friend, Frode Elgesem, should become a member of the central board of Wergelandsenteret who provides funds to Utøya AS, where her former spouse Martin Henriksen sits as a member. Brenna admitted to not having considered her impartiality, and reported the matter to the Storting's Standing Committee on Scrutiny and Constitutional Affairs and also asked for an interim minister to assume her duties while the matter is being investigated. International development minister Anne Beathe Tvinnereim was appointed interim minister and handled cases were Brenna had not been impartial. Unlike other cabinet members who faced scandals, Brenna was kept in place until being appointed minister of labour and social inclusion in the October 2023 reshuffle.

In February 2024, Brenna was criticised by the Standing Committee on Scrutiny and Constitutional Affairs for her mishandling of partiality in the distribution of monetary support to the Rafto foundation, Wergeland - centre and Utøya AS. She was also criticised for her appointment of a close friend to the board of the company. Her former spouse as well as two of her close friends were already members of the board, in addition to the close friend she was in the process of appointing before recusing herself for not being impartial to the matter. On 3 April, the committee announced that it would be seeking to determine whether she had broken her duty to inform parliament in regards to providing accurate and relevant information pertaining to the case. According to Aftenposten, Brenna was given until 12 April to respond to its questions regarding the matter.

=== Anette Trettebergstuen ===
A day after the revelations about Tonje Brenna, Nettavisen revealed that Trettebergstuen had been involved in a similar case when she appointed two colleagues from the Labour Party to the board of Norsk Tipping, one of which was appointed chair of the board. Trettebergstuen confirmed that she had evaluated her impartiality when it came to the appointment of one of them, Thomas Breen, but not the other, Sylvia Brustad. She reasoned that her relation to Brustad was not strong enough to warrant an impartiality assessment. Two days later, Aftenposten revealed that Trettebergstuen had earlier in June nominated close friend Renate Larsen to the board of the Oslo Opera House. The newspaper also revealed that she had made two other appointments as well without impartiality considerations, one of which is also a godparent to her son. At a press conference the same day, Trettebergstuen announced that she would resign as culture minister. She formally resigned on 28 June and was succeeded by Lubna Jaffery.

=== Ola Borten Moe ===
A month following the Brenna and Trettebergstuen cases, NRK revealed that Borten Moe had appointed "an old acquaintance", Karl Eirik Haug, to the board of the Norwegian Institute of International Affairs in December 2021 and that the Ministry of Education had considered him impartial in the issue. However the nature of the appointment is classified. Borten Moe knew both Haug and his wife Monica Rolfsen, with both he also served with in the Trondheim City Council, and Borten Moe had also attended their wedding. Later that month, on 21 July; E24 revealed that Borten Moe had bought weapons stocks in Kongsberg Gruppen. He also admitted that he had breached the government's guidelines for stock trading and had not considered impartiality in the matter. The National Authority for Investigation and Prosecution of Economic and Environmental Crime announced that they would open an investigation into his dealings. At a press conference the same day, Borten Moe announced that he would resign as higher education minister. He formally resigned on 4 August and was succeeded by agriculture minister Sandra Borch.

=== Anniken Huitfeldt ===
In late August 2023, Huitfeldt informed Verdens Gang that she had breached several impartiality rules with her husband Ola Flem, having bought stocks in several weapons and fisheries companies. Both Huitfeldt and her husband apologised for the situation, while prime minister Jonas Gahr Støre expressed that he still had trust in her based on her apology. The Progress Party later asked her to consider resigning when discrepancies in her public revealed and undisclosed information were revealed to contradict each other. Similar to Tonje Brenna, Huitfeldt was kept as minister until the October 2023 cabinet reshuffle. Unlike Brenna, Huitfeldt was dismissed and replaced with Espen Barth Eide as foreign minister.

=== Sandra Borch ===
In January 2024, E24 revealed that parts of Borch's master's-degree thesis had been plagiarised ten years prior. The case led to multiple calls for her resignation by both academic and legal experts, and she ultimately announced her intention to do so on 19 January. She formally resigned on 23 January and was succeeded by her state secretary, Oddmund Løkensgard Hoel. In March of the same year, the University of Tromsø announced that her thesis would be annulled, and Borch confirmed that she would not object to the decision.

=== Ingvild Kjerkol ===
In January 2024, it was revealed that the master's thesis of Kjerkol had similarities to other papers. The story broke shortly after the case involving Borch and placed the minister under heavy scrutiny. On 21 January, Støre affirmed his trust in the minister and emphasised the importance to him that the case should be treated as that of any other student. In 2021, Kjerkol pursued a master's degree in knowledge management at Nord University. The thesis bears similarities to a case report in the same field that was not cited in the sources by Kjerkol and her undisclosed writing partner. In addition to bearing similarities to other papers and reports in the field, the thesis may also allegedly constitute research fraud. This allegation was made by Hans Fredrik Marthinussen, a professor of law at the University of Bergen. Marthinussen contended that it may be fraudalent research if it was true that Kjerkol presented answers collected from participants in another research project as her own findings. Kjerkol has since the revelations vehemently denied any wrongdoing and insisted that what may appear as plagiarism is instead a result of having used similar methods to other researchers in the field.

On 26 January, it was revealed that the university would examine the case in order to determine whether the paper contains plagiarised passages, and on 8 March 2024 the case was reported to have been referred to Joint Complaints Board that will ultimately decide the case. On 2 April, it was revealed that Kjerkol had hired a lawyer to represent her in the upcoming decision by the board. The lawyer hired by Kjerkol, Marianne Klausen was herself formerly a part of the Joint Complaints Board, which is the highest body ruling on cases pertaining to plagiarism and cheating by Norwegian students in higher education. Klausen served for two periods but was dismissed shortly after being appointed a third time, due to having been unlawfully appointed to the board by Sandra Borch. The hiring of Klausen was controversial not only due to the prior revocation of appointment but also due to Klausen's high fees as a lawyer. The controversy stemmed due to it first being reported that the university would pay for the representation. However, this was quickly corrected by Kjerkol who clarified that she would be paying for the lawyer herself.

On 11 April, the Joint Complaints Board of Nord University confirmed that they had found the thesis to contain plagiarized sections. As a result, Kjerkol's degree would be revoked. She received the university's verdict on 12 April, which concluded that she had cheated with intent. Later that day, she and prime minister Jonas Gahr Støre announced that she would resign as minister. She was succeeded by trade minister Jan Christian Vestre on 19 April. On 2 May, her lawyer announced that Kjerkol would appeal the verdict from Nord University.
