= Ivar B. Prestbakmo =

Norwegian politician

State Secretary to the Minister of Research and Higher Education
- In office 23 January 2024 – 15 November 2024
- Prime Minister: Jonas Gahr Støre
- Minister: Oddmund Løkensgard Hoel
- Preceded by: Oddmund Løkensgard Hoel
- Succeeded by: Signe Bjotveit

Deputy Member of the Storting
- In office 1 October 2021 – 30 September 2025
- Deputising for: Sandra Borch (2021–2024)
- Constituency: Troms
- In office 1 October 1993 – 30 September 2001
- Constituency: Troms

County Mayor of Troms and Finnmark
- In office 1 January 2020 – 14 December 2021
- Deputy: Tarjei Jensen Bech
- Cabinet Chair: Bjørn Inge Mo
- Preceded by: Position established
- Succeeded by: Tarjei Jensen Bech

Troms County Commissioner for Transport and the Environment
- In office 8 January 2014 – 28 October 2019
- Cabinet Chair: Line Fusdahl; Cecilie Myrseth; Willy Ørnebakk
- Preceded by: Terje Olsen
- Succeeded by: Kristina Hansen (Transport); Bjarne Rhode (Environment)

Mayor of Salangen Municipality
- In office October 1999 – 20 January 2014
- Deputy: Oddveig Kristiansen; Lars Johan Hellefossmo; Karin Haugli Zachariassen; Gry Hege Rognsaa; Ronny Karlsen
- Preceded by: Astrid Tunheim
- Succeeded by: Sigrun W. Prestbakmo

Personal details
- Born: 7 November 1968 (age 57)
- Party: Centre
- Spouse: Sigrun Wiggen Prestbakmo

Ivar Bühring Prestbakmo (born 7 November 1968) is a Norwegian politician for the Centre Party. He served as a deputy member of the Storting for Troms from 2021 to 2025, having previously done so from 1993 to 2001. Prestbakmo was mayor of Salangen Municipality from 1999 to 2014, when he became county commissioner for transport and the environment until 2019.

== Political career ==
=== Local politics ===
On the local level, Prestbakmo served as mayor of Salangen Municipality from 1999 to 2014. Upon being elected, Oddveig Kristiansen was deputy mayor until resigning in 2001 and was replaced by Lars Johan Hellefossmo. Following the 2003 local elections, the Conservatives' Karin Haugli Zachariassen became deputy mayor. Zachariassen was succeeded by Gry Hege Rognsaa from the Centre Party following the 2007 local elections. The Conservatives returned to the deputy mayor post with Ronny Karlsen following the 2011 local elections.

Upon his departure, his wife Sigrun W. Prestbakmo succeeded him as mayor, something which was unprecedented at the time. His wife continued as mayor until 2023 when she was appointed state secretary at the Ministry of Local Government and Regional Development.

He chaired the county party chapter between 2006 and 2012.

In 2014, he was appointed Troms County Commissioner for Transport and the Environment in the county cabinet of Line Fusdahl. He was retained by Cecilie Myrseth and her cabinet following the 2015 local elections. Following her resignation in 2017, Prestbakmo was again retained by Myrseth's successor Willy Ørnebakk.

Following the 2019 local elections, Prestbakmo was elected county mayor for the newly established Troms and Finnmark county, with the Labour Party's Tarjei Jensen Beck as deputy mayor. Prestbakmo went on leave as county mayor after he took on the duties for Sandra Borch, who served in government. Deputy county mayor Jensen Bech took on his duties from 14 December 2021, with the Centre Party's Rikke Håkstad as acting deputy mayor.

=== Parliament ===
He served as a deputy representative to the Norwegian Parliament from Troms from 1993 to 2001 and again since 2021. He deputised for Sandra Borch, who served in the Støre Cabinet between 2021 and 2024.

=== State Secretary ===
On 23 January 2024, Prestbakmo was appointed state secretary to the Minister of Research and Higher Education Oddmund Løkensgard Hoel. He was reassigned to be state secretary for minister of local government Erling Sande on 15 November and was succeeded by Signe Bjotveit a week later.

== Personal life ==
Prestbakmo is married to Sigrun Wiggen Prestbakmo.
