= Oddmund Løkensgard Hoel =

Norwegian linguist and author

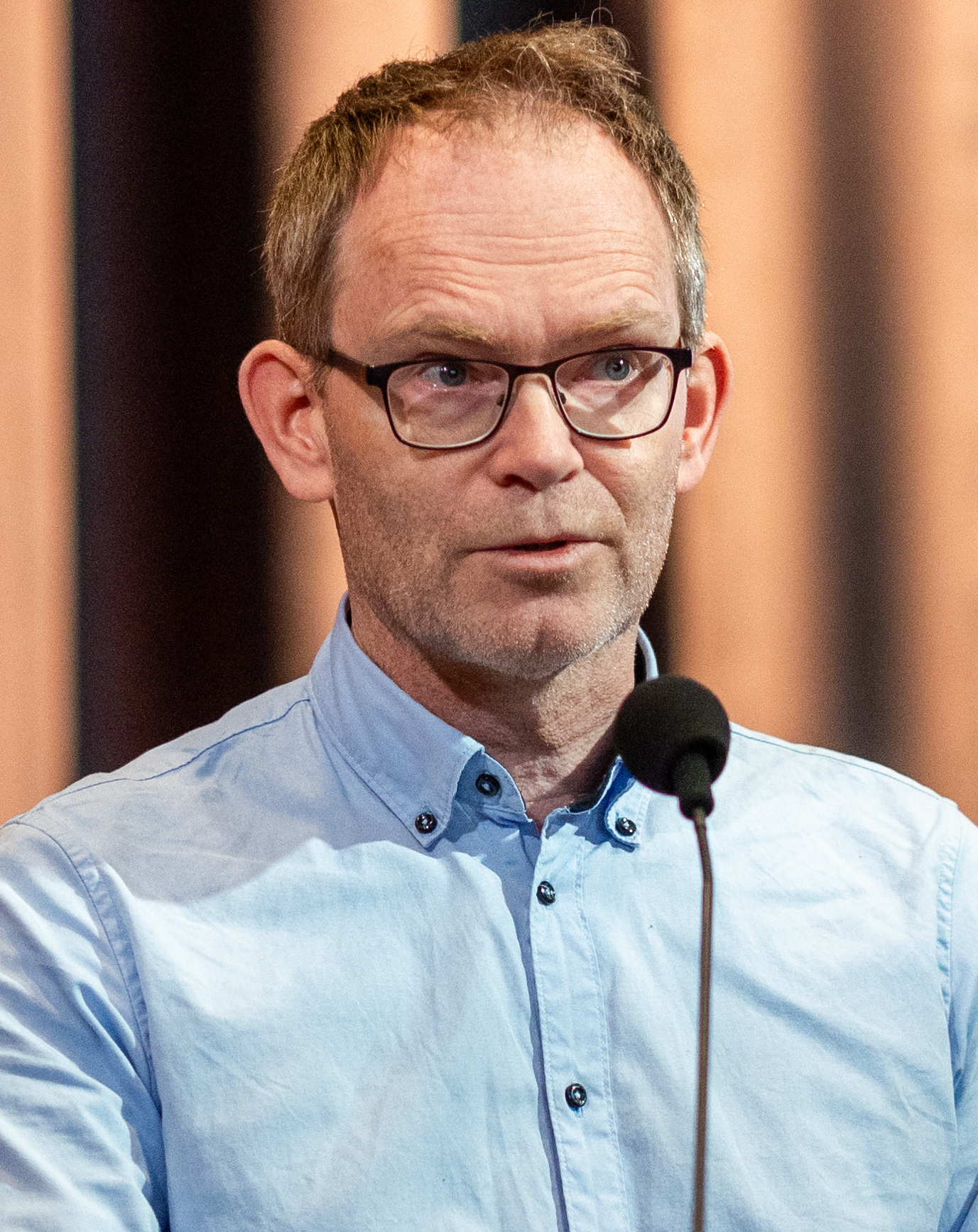
- Hoel in 2024

Minister of Research and Higher Education
- In office 23 January 2024 – 4 February 2025
- Prime Minister: Jonas Gahr Støre
- Preceded by: Sandra Borch
- Succeeded by: Sigrun Gjerløw Aasland

State Secretary to the Minister of Research and Higher Education
- In office 22 October 2021 – 23 January 2024
- Prime Minister: Jonas Gahr Støre
- Minister: Ola Borten Moe; Sandra Borch
- Preceded by: Aase Marthe Horrigmo
- Succeeded by: Ivar B. Prestbakmo

Personal details
- Born: 8 November 1968 (age 57) Trondheim, Sør-Trøndelag, Norway
- Party: Centre
- Children: 3
- Education: University of Oslo; Norwegian University of Science and Technology
- Occupation: Professor

Oddmund Løkensgard Hoel (born 8 November 1968) is a Norwegian professor and politician for the Centre Party. He served as minister of research and higher education from 2024 to 2025, having previously served as state secretary to said minister between 2021 and 2024.

== Academic career ==
He studied Nordic languages and literature at the University of Oslo in 1996 and received a doctorate in history from the Norwegian University of Science and Technology in 2009.

Hoel went on to work for the Western Norway University of Applied Sciences from 2007. He became a professor in 2019. Furthermore, he has been the editor of journal Heimen since 2019 and also led Noregs Mållag between 1999 and 2002.

== Political career ==
=== Local politics ===
Hoel was elected to the municipal council of Luster Municipality at the 2019 local elections. He wasn't re-elected after the 2023 local elections.

=== State Secretary ===
He was appointed state secretary to the Minister of Research and Higher Education, Ola Borten Moe, on 22 October 2021.

When Borten Moe resigned in July 2023, Hoel was mentioned as a candidate to succeed him, but he was ultimately not chosen. Instead he was retained as state secretary by Borten Moe's successor, Sandra Borch.

=== Minister of Research and Higher Education ===
On 23 January 2024, he was appointed minister of research and higher education following Sandra Borch's resignation after being involved in a plagiarism scandal.

==== 2024 ====
Mere 24 hours after his appointment, Hoel announced that the government would be taking action to make the intake process to higher education simpler. He also confirmed that they would notably consider scrapping age points.

After a few weeks in office, Hoel admitted that he had cheated with the numbers of members when he was a part of Norsk Målungdom. The organisation were sentenced in 2002 for lying about made up local chapters, one of which Hoel was registered as the leader for. However he denied that his local chapter was made up, citing the membership in his chapter were low and not too significant.

The Nordland County Council requested that the government prioritise decentralised education and science offers in Nesna at the Nesna campus of Nord University, which it had promised in its 2021 deceleration. This had also included a national center for these purposes and a trial offer for primary schools. In early March, Hoel clarified that the government currently had no plans for such a center, citing that their priority always had been to re-establish teacher education in Nesna and it will continue to be so. Regarding an alternative to the center, he added that the government would continue to invest in flexible and decentralised higher education.

In early June, Aftenposten revealed that he has kissed his departmental director general following a research conference a month earlier. Hoel and the director general confirmed that the incident had taken place and he expressed his regret and called his own behaviour "inappropriate" and "unprofessional".

As the statistics of applicants for higher education where revealed near the end of July, Hoel expressed concern about the continued low application numbers for teacher training. On the other hand, he expressed optimism regarding reports that many students had been accepted to their desired studies, which he noted could be due to more decentralised higher education and lower competition.

Hoel announced in September that the government would be proposing 20 new locations for medical studies in Vestland. He emphasised the importance of the move and the aim of a more decentralised offer in medical studies which would be important to "quality, national security and emergency preparedness".

As the government faced criticism for their budget proposal regarding students and their economic situation, Hoel defended the government's decision during a question time in December. He argued that they had increased students' purchasing power by 32% compared to at the beginning of the parliamentary term. He also asserted that education would still be free despite criticism levelled against the government's exam fee contributing to the opposite effect.

==== 2025 ====
During a question time in parliament in January, Hoel was questioned by Progress Party member Himanshu Gulati about whether or not it was incorrect to refer to the two genders as "he/she" after a psychology student failed an exam after using the terms. Hoel simply responded "no" and Gulati praised his response and emphasised his right to raise the question in parliament.

Following the Centre Party's withdrawal from government, he was succeeded by state secretary Sigrun Gjerløw Aasland on 4 February 2025.

== Personal life ==
Hoel moved to Jostedalen in 2000. He has previously been married and has three children.

== Bibliography ==
- Hoel, Oddmund Løkensgard (1996). Nasjonalisme i norsk målstrid 1848-1865. Oslo, Norway: Research Council of Norway. ISBN 8212006956.
- Hoel, Oddmund Løkensgard (2009). Målreising og modernisering i Noreg 1885-1940. Trondheim, Norway: Norwegian University of Science and Technology, Faculty of Humanities. ISBN 9788247118160.
- Hoel, Oddmund Løkensgard (2011). Norsk målreising: Mål og modernisering 1868-1940. Oslo, Norway: Det Norske Samlaget. ISBN 9788252174465.
- Hoel, Oddmund Løkensgard (2017). Fjordfylket på nye vegar: 1875-1945. Bergen, Norway: Fagbokforlaget. ISBN 9788245019162.

Political offices
Preceded by Sandra Borch	Minister of Research and Higher Education; 2024–2025	Succeeded by Sigrun Gjerløw Aasland
Preceded by Aase Marthe Horrigmo	State Secretary to the Minister of Research and Higher Education; 2021–2024	Succeeded by Ivar B. Prestbakmo
Cultural offices
Preceded by Liv Ingebrigtsen	Leader of Noregs Mållag; 1999–2002	Succeeded by Vidar Lund
