= Tonning (surname) =

Tonning is a Norwegian surname. Notable people with the surname include:

- Knud Karl Krogh-Tonning (1842–1911), Norwegian theologian
- Kristian Tonning Riise (born 1988), Norwegian politician
- Peder Tonning (1782–1839), Norwegian politician
