= Anna Brustad Moe =

Norwegian politician (born 1975)

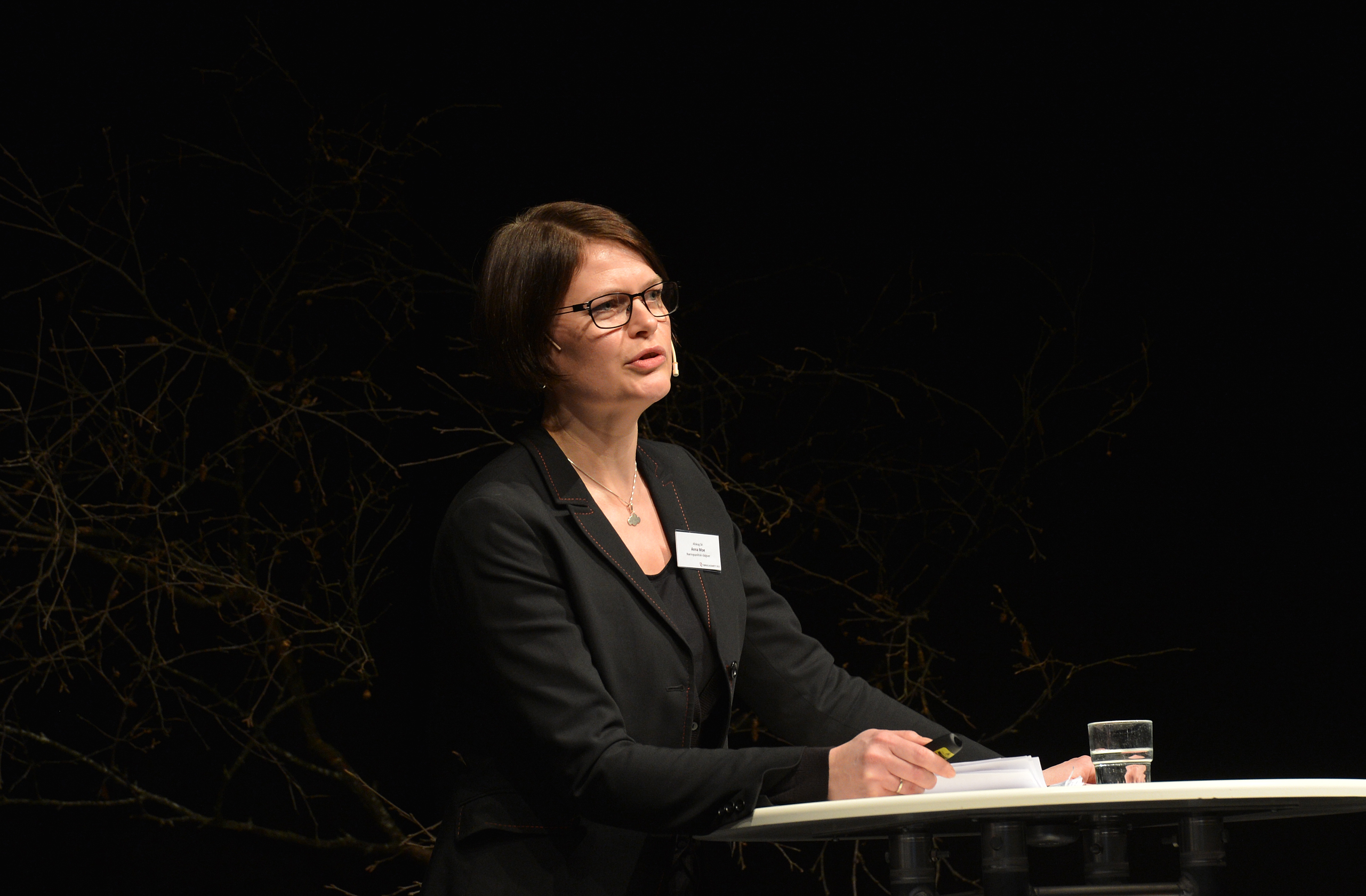
Anna Ceselie Brustad Moe, 2013

Anna Ceselie Brustad Moe (née Brustad; born 8 May 1975) is a Norwegian politician for the Centre Party. She is now a political advisor for NHO Trøndelag since 2017.

She served as a deputy representative to the Norwegian Parliament from Nord-Trøndelag during the term 2005-09. In 2008, when regular representative Lars Peder Brekk was appointed to the second cabinet Stoltenberg, Brustad Moe moved up to a regular seat. On the local level, Brustad Moe has been a member of the municipal council of Frosta Municipality.

She is married to fellow MP Ola Borten Moe. They have lived at Leinstrand and Smestad and have two kids.
