= Aase Marthe Horrigmo =

Norwegian politician (born 1982)

Aase Marthe Johansen Horrigmo (born 11 July 1982) is a Norwegian politician for the Conservative Party.

Horrigmo hails from Vennesla Municipality. She moved to Kristiansand Municipality where she was a local politician as well as adviser to mayor Harald Furre. In 2018, she joined Solberg's Cabinet as a State Secretary for Monica Mæland in the Ministry of Local Government and Modernisation. In January 2020, Horrigmo changed to being State Secretary for Henrik Asheim in the Ministry of Education and Research. Solberg's Cabinet fell in 2021. Horrigmo was elected as a deputy representative to the Parliament of Norway from Vest-Agder for the term 2021–2025.

Outside of politics, she took the PhD in political science at the University of Oslo in 2012 with the thesis Cultural connections. Culture as a tool for regional development in Nordic local and regional governments. In May 2022 she was named as the new director of travel in Innovation Norway.
