= Tom Einar Karlsen =

Norwegian politician

Deputy Member of the Storting
- Incumbent
- Assumed office 1 October 2021
- Deputising for: Cecilie Myrseth (2023–)
- Constituency: Troms

Personal details
- Born: 15 September 1981 (age 44)
- Party: Labour Party
- Occupation: Plumber; Politician

Tom Einar Karlsen (born 15 September 1981) is a Norwegian plumber and politician for the Labour Party. A deputy to the Storting from Troms since 2021, he has met as deputy for Cecilie Myrseth since 2023.

== Personal life and education ==
Karlsen was born on 15 September 1981. He hails from Harstad and is a plumber by education.

== Political career ==
=== Local politics ===
Karlsen was a member of the municipal council of Harstad from 2019, and of Troms county council from 2023.

=== Parliament ===
Karlsen was elected deputy representative to the Storting from the constituency of Troms for the period 2021–2025, for the Labour Party. He replaced Cecilie Myrseth at the Storting from October 2023 while Myrseth was government minister.

He was re-elected deputy representative to the Storting for the period 2025–2029, and thus continued to met as substitute for Cecilie Myrseth.
