= Christopher Wand =

Norwegian politician

Christopher Wand (born 28 June 1987) is a Norwegian politician for the Conservative Party.

He served as a deputy representative to the Parliament of Norway from Buskerud during the terms 2013–2017 and 2017–2021. In total he met during 33 days of parliamentary session. He hails from Hole and has been a member of the municipal council and county council. He has a bachelor's degree from the BI Norwegian Business School and was the secretary-general of the Norwegian Young Conservatives.

In July 2018 he married fellow Conservative Party politician Sandra Bruflot.

Party political offices
Preceded by Julie Remen	Secretary-general of the Norwegian Young Conservatives; 2012–2015	Succeeded by Erlend Svardal Bøe
