= Sandra Borch =

Norwegian politician (born 1988)

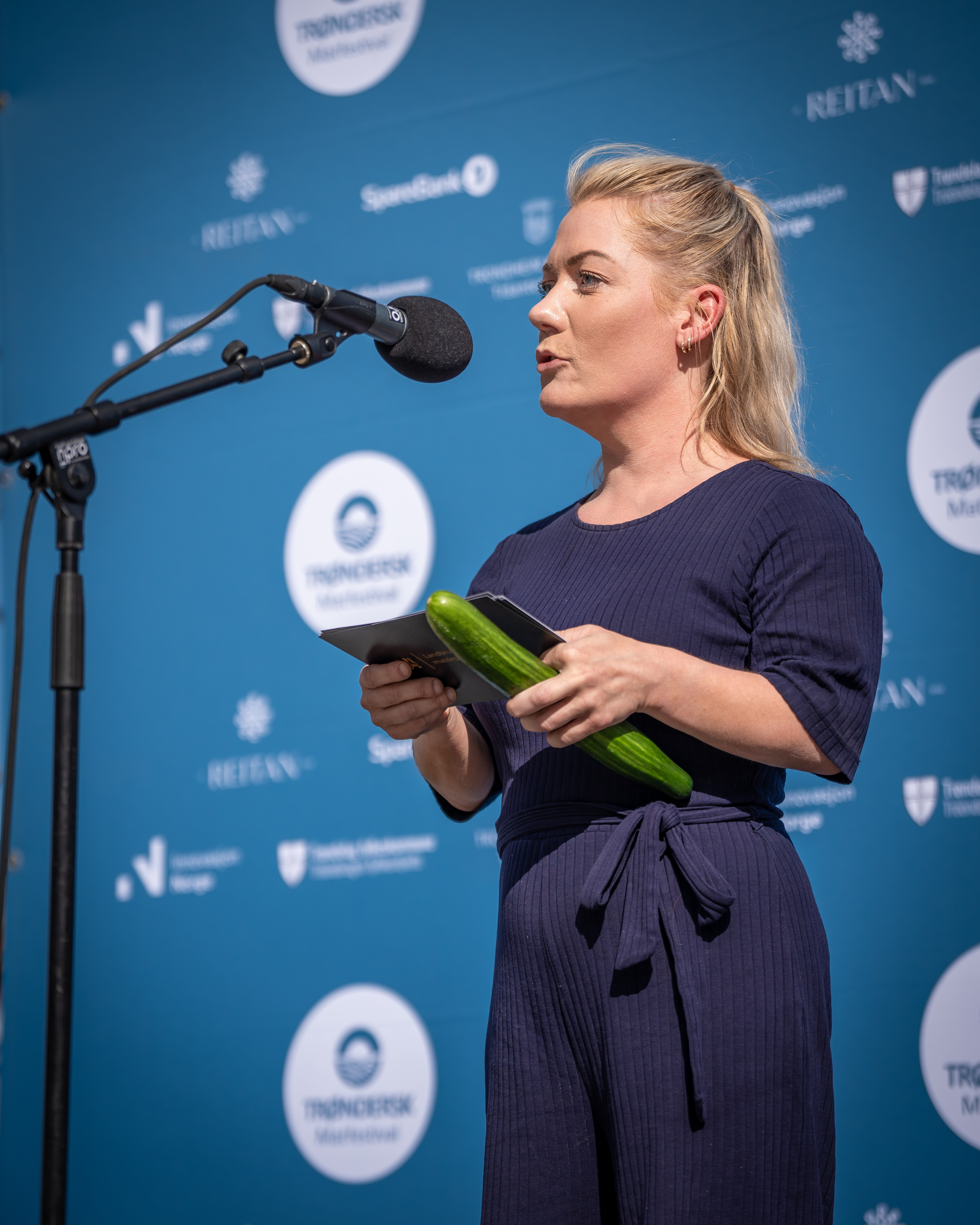
- Borch in 2023

Minister of Research and Higher Education
- In office 4 August 2023 – 23 January 2024
- Prime Minister: Jonas Gahr Støre
- Preceded by: Ola Borten Moe
- Succeeded by: Oddmund Løkensgard Hoel

Minister of Agriculture and Food
- In office 14 October 2021 – 4 August 2023
- Prime Minister: Jonas Gahr Støre
- Preceded by: Olaug Bollestad
- Succeeded by: Geir Pollestad

Member of the Storting
- In office 1 October 2017 – 30 September 2025
- Deputy: Ivar B. Prestbakmo
- Constituency: Troms

Leader of the Centre Youth
- In office 6 November 2011 – 10 November 2013
- Preceded by: Johannes Rindal
- Succeeded by: Erling Laugsand

Deputy Member of the Storting
- In office 1 October 2009 – 30 September 2013
- Constituency: Troms

Personal details
- Born: 23 April 1988 (age 38) Lavangen, Troms, Norway
- Party: Centre
- Spouse: Øystein Andreas Jensen (m. 2026)
- Education: University of Tromsø (Master's thesis annulled, degree and diploma withdrawn)
- Occupation: Politician

Sandra Konstance Nygård Borch (born 23 April 1988) is a Norwegian politician who served as the minister of research and higher education from 2023 to 2024 until her resignation over the extensive plagiarism in her master's thesis.

As minister, she had launched a crackdown on students' reuse of their own texts, so-called "self-plagiarism," leading to criticism from many academics who argued that reuse of one's own work is not plagiarism or research misconduct. She previously served as minister of agriculture and food from 2021 to 2023. A member of the Centre Party, she served as the leader of the Centre Youth from 2011 to 2013, while simultaneously serving as a deputy MP from her home constituency of Troms from 2009 to 2013. She was elected a permanent representative in 2017.

In January 2024, it was revealed that significant parts of her master's thesis are plagiarised. She announced her resignation in the evening of 19 January 2024. In March 2024, she lost her degree from the University of Tromsø.

In January 2026, Borch was charged with two counts of driving under the influence in October 2025, with BAC levels of 0,64‰ and 1,56‰ – the legal limit being 0,2‰ in Norway. In February 2026, Borch was sentenced to a suspended prison sentence of 30 days, a fine of 100.000 NOK and lost her driving licence for three years.

== Background and education ==
Borch grew up on a sheep farm in Lavangen in Troms.

Borch is born with achondroplasia, a common form of short stature. Because of this, she experienced a lot of bullying and hardship. Borch has stated that she has learned to live with the incitements by ignoring it and concentrating on her life and work duties.

She graduated from Sjøvegan high school in 2007 and received a Master of Jurisprudence from the University of Tromsø in 2014, which she lost in 2024 due to it being revealed that significant parts of her master's thesis had been plagiarised. She received the grade D in the ECTS grading scale.

Borch is a native Norwegian speaker, and has said that she has some Sámi ancestry. In 2013, she registered for the Sámi Parliament electoral roll. In 2024, her registration was criticized as inauthentic, in connection with an investigation into "pseudo-Sámi" by the parliament.

== Political career ==
=== Parliament ===
Borch was elected a deputy member from Troms for the Centre Party in 2009, and later an ordinary member to the Storting for the period 2017–2021. In the Storting, she was a member of the Standing Committee on Energy and the Environment from 2017 to 2021. She was re-elected to the Storting for the period 2021–2025. While being a member of the Støre cabinet between 2021 and 2024, Ivar B. Prestbakmo met in her place.

Following her departure as minister, she joined the Standing Committee on Justice.

She had sought re-election at the 2025 election, but ultimately lost her seat.

=== Party politics ===
Following Ola Borten Moe's resignation, Borch was floated by the Troms and Nordland branches as a candidate to replace him as deputy leader of the party.

=== Youth league ===
She was leader of the Troms branch of the Centre Youth from 2007 to 2009, before she became a member of the Centre Youth's central board. She then served as the international relations leader from 2009 to 2010, and organisational deputy leader from 2010 to 2011.

In November 2011, she was elected the new leader of the Centre Youth with 85 votes against her opponent Lars Vangen's 80.

In October 2012, the Centre Youth asked in a letter to the Centre Party's central board that the party should challenge the leadership style of Liv Signe Navarsete after she had become loudly angry at Borch. The background was that Borch had the same day opened for Ola Borten Moe as a possible future leader of the Centre Party. After a debate at a central board meeting five days later, and an unreserved apology from Navarsete, Borch expressed that she had full confidence in her.

As leader of the Centre Youth, Borch opened up for a new debate and oil extraction in Lofoten and Vesterålen. The proposal was however voted down at the Centre Youth's congress in November 2012.

Borch notably took a stand against cyber bullying after she experienced it herself surrounding her height. In a blog post, she expressed disgust with anonymous bullies and called them cowards. She further expressed that cyber bullying had become a big and widespread problem in society, and called for it to be put on the agenda.

In September 2013, Borch announced that she would not seek re-election as leader, despite having previously indicated that she wanted to. She cited her reason being that she disagreed with the mother party's business policies. In November, she was succeeded by Erling Laugsand.

=== Minister of Agriculture and Food ===
She was appointed minister of agriculture in Støre's Cabinet on 14 October 2021.

==== 2021 ====
In one of her first cases as minister, Borch stopped the sale of the Løken farm in Volbu, Valdres. Borch stated that the ministry would work together with Øystre Slidre Municipality to find a more appropriate ownership and operation of the farm.

Borch accused her predecessor, Olaug Bollestad, to not have dealt with compensation to the agricultural sector properly before the previous government's departure. She notably pointed to the budget priority in the state budget that didn't let of any costs to deal with its problems. She further stated: "But we must also keep in mind that there are many farmers out there who experience great financial insecurity because they have not been invested in the last eight years".

On 8 December, she and state secretary Aleksander Øren Heen from the Ministry of the Climate and Environment met with mayors, local representatives and affected traders in surrounding areas of Hardangervidda, affected by a recent wave of scrapie decease. Of the meeting, Borch said: "It is demanding to deal with this serious animal disease. I am therefore pleased that we have had a good meeting with mayors in the Hardangervidda area, local government and other affected traders. It is important for me to listen to their input before the Minister of Climate and the Environment and I soon will decide whether it will be necessary to carry out an extraordinary removal of wild reindeer in the winter of 2021/22".

After the government announced that they would be paying parts of the electricity prices for the greenhouse industry, Borch wrote: "The government has decided that the greenhouse industry will be compensated for the higher electricity prices. We have worked for a long time with this and taken the input from the industry very seriously". She later went on to say: "The greenhouse industry is important for the self-sufficiency row in Norway and facilitates more green production. We have worked intensely to get the scheme in place".

On 21 December, Borch suggested that food chain companies should end their price war before Christmas, after multiple of their products had seen an increase in prices. She notably stated: "I think it's unusual to wage price war on seasonal goods in the way that the chains still do. We have not seen it as much on pork ribs this year as in previous years, but I really think this is unusual". She also mentioned that she was in "good dialog" with the companies, but also said that they had to set better prices on food they get from farmers.

On 27 December, it was announced in a press release that she and minister of fisheries Bjørnar Skjæran would put forward a Storting report addressing animal welfare. In the press release, Borch said: "In the work on the report, we will take a closer look at the development in Norwegian livestock production and all the knowledge we now have about animal welfare. We will consider whether it is necessary to make changes to ensure better regulations". It's been 20 years since last time animal welfare was evaluated. Her and Skjæran's ministries will work together with other relevant ministries in order to present the report in 2024.

==== 2022 ====
During autumn of 2021, farmers' organisations and the state had agreed on compensation to farmers at 754 million kr due to price increases on fertilizers and other goods. In January 2022, with the agricultural settlement negotiations looming, farmers's organisations asked Borch to take the initiative to start additional negotiations. Borch rejected the proposal, reasoning that additional negotiations had already taken place, and that they had then agreed to return to increased expenses in the agricultural settlement come spring.

Borch presented the government electricity farmers' package on 17 January. The package includes that the government will pay for 55% of the bill if the electricity price rises above 70 kr per kilowatt hour in the morning of December and 80% through January to March. Borch stated:

I am concerned that the money to the farmers will be paid out as soon as possible, and the Norwegian Directorate of Agriculture aims to start with payments towards the end of February [...].

Borch received backlash from the Liberal Party and animal welfare organisations after suggesting that the wolf hunting period could be extended beyond the current one between 1 January and 15 February. The Liberals' Ola Elvestuen reacted, saying: "There is no reason to extend the felling period. It is set for 15 February to avoid hunting during the mating and breeding season for wolves. Animal welfare must take precedence over the government's desire to hunt. These are stable flocks in established territories. It does no harm if any wolf is still allowed to live". The animal welfare organisation NOAH, cited: "The Ministry itself has stated that this deadline is set for animal welfare reasons. Then one can not suddenly say that it no longer applies".

As a result of the ongoing Russian invasion of Ukraine, Borch announced a new guarantee of profitability for farmers who want to sow food grains in Norway. She also noted that the consequences for consumers would be the prices. She also opened for that the government and state would take a larger share of the bill for the food - instead of collecting it through increased prices to consumers. This would also be a part of the agricultural settlement.

Borch toured farms in Southern Norway to hear farmers' needs in preparations for the agricultural settlement that would start in week 17. She expressed that the settlement negotiations "my most important exam", and went on to say that the government would be contributing to economic safety for farmers. She also expressed sympathy for farmers' concerns.

Borch negotiated her first agricultural settlement from late April until 16 May, when she and the Norwegian Agrarian Association reached an agreed settlement of 10.9 million kr. Borch called the settlement "important" and emphasised that it had been important for the government to start a raise of farmers' income, stating: "This signal is important to give to regain optimism in the industry and to make the industry believe that the government wants to invest in them".

In early July, Borch encouraged grocery store giants to take their share of the food bill regarding the raise in food prices. She also emphasised that customers shouldn't pay everything themselves and that the giants had an important responsibility at present.

In September, she spoke out about the possibility of a Centre Party exit from government and low opinion polling, saying: "It's not good and I understand the frustration out there. At the same time, it has been a demanding time to take over. I also know that it is too easy to say that the crises are the explanation for that, but we know that it has raised political debates that have been demanding to stand in". She further stated that there would be difficult times ahead, noting that the crisis can take much time for individual ministers.

With the state budget for 2023 being presented on 6 October, Borch announced that the government would be severing state funding to NOAH, an animal protection organisation. She expressed that it wasn't the government's ambition to nullify NOAH's funding, and added that they were prioritising other member organisations. The organisation's academic director, Siri Martinsen, expressed that the cut in funding seemed like a punishment reaction in response to the organisation rating the Centre Party as the worst party in regards to animal welfare just before the 2021 election, something Borch denied.

On 12 December, she met with the Reindeer Management Board to discuss grazing conflicts, loss of reindeer to predators, follow-up to the Fosen verdict, risk of scurvy and changes to the Reindeer Management Act.

==== 2023 ====
In January 2023, she pledged to bring the reindeer field's view to the government regarding the Fosen case. She also expressed that the case was an area dispute and furthermore that such issues are difficult to solve. She also expressed that her ministry has good dialogue with the reindeer industry after visiting Fosen herself.

In February, she was denied travel to Svalbard from Tromsø after having forgotten her passport at her ministerial apartment. Per law, it is mandatory to either have a passport or national identity card in order to visit Svalbard. Borch admitted to the slip up, while a state secretary was dispatched to retrieve her passport back in Oslo. She was scheduled to visit the Svalbard Global Seed Vault for its 15th anniversary celebration.

Following avalanches in Troms in late March, Borch, along with her colleagues Emilie Enger Mehl and Bjørnar Skjæran, visited the county and inspected the damage. They also met with local officials and rescue services.

In May, Borch presented the state and the Norwegian Agrarian Association' agricultural settlement, with an offer of 4.1 billion kr. While the Agrarian Association expressed satisfaction with the settlement, the Norwegian Farmers and Smallholders Union rejected the settlement and called it "air money which never benefits the farmer and will lead to an increased income gap for the rest of society". The union had not reached a common demand with the Agrarian Association prior to settlement negotiations, resulting in the Agrarian Association negotiating with the state solo.

On 4 August, she was succeeded by Geir Pollestad upon being appointed minister of research and higher education.

=== Minister of Research and Higher Education ===
Borch was appointed minister of research and higher education in August 2023 following Ola Borten Moe's resignation in the wake of a weapons stock scandal.

==== 2023 ====
Shortly after assuming office, Borch joined prime minister Jonas Gahr Støre in Trondheim to announce the government's green lighting construction for a new campus at the Norwegian University of Science and Technology. The following month, she and the prime minister announced that the government would invest in research into artificial intelligence and digital technology.

Borch visited the University of Tromsø in October, where she praised their program which aimed to encourage more male students to try health professions.

In December, she announced that the Ministry of Education would reject a request from four universities and colleges to remove grade requirements for students applying for the teacher and nurse degrees. The universities and colleges reacted with concern for the declining numbers of applicants in these respective fields.

==== 2024 ====
In January, Borch announced that the Ministry of Education would appeal the verdict to the Supreme Court of Norway in the case of a student's reuse of their own text, referred to as "self-plagiarism", after the student had won a lawsuit against the government in Borgarting Court of Appeal in December 2023.

Later that month, media outlets revealed that parts of her master's thesis from ten years prior had been plagiarised, which lead to calls for her resignation. Borch announced her resignation on 19 January. She formally resigned on 23 January and was succeeded by her state secretary, Oddmund Løkensgard Hoel.

== Plagiarism affair ==
In early 2024, it was revealed that significant parts of her master's thesis are plagiarized from older master's theses by students at other Norwegian universities, leading to calls for her immediate resignation. E24 documented that at least 20% of the thesis has been plagiarized from six other master's theses. Aftenposten further documented that an additional 10,000 characters were plagiarized from a report commissioned by the Ministry of Labour and Social Inclusion.

Lawyer and expert on intellectual property law Magnus Stray Vyrje said her plagiarism was "as serious as it can get" and that the withdrawal of her degree is a likely outcome. Law professor Terje Einarsen said Borch's degree can be revoked and she can be banned for studying at Norwegian universities for cheating at an exam.

As a result of the plagiarism affair, she resigned from her political roles in the evening of 19 January 2024.

On 14 March, it was announced that her degree would be annulled and Borch stated that she would not object to the verdict.

== Other controversy ==
In 2025, a verdict of the Norwegian Press Complaints Commission, sided with Borch; She had earlier filed a complaint with the commission, in regard to NRK's claim that Borch did not qualify as being "Sami enough", to vote in Sami parliamentary elections; Nordkalottfolket (politicical party) also filed a complaint against NRK.

Earlier (2024), NRK had researchers check if Borch is of Sami ethnicity, to see if she meets criteria for those who should be allowed to vote in elections for Sami Parliament of Norway; The chief of NRK does not agree (as of November) with any of the criticism against that investigation. News outlets that have had articles supporting Borch's continued voting rights, include iFinnmark.no.

A 16 November 2024 Aftenposten article explains in which ways that [the] investigative journalists, have conflicts of interest; One of those is that one of the ancestry-researchers (slektsforsker), is a cousin of the partner (samboer) of one of the journalists; Furthermore, part of the controversy is that some are saying that the journalists have not disclosed that they are not impartial [or possibly not impartial].

Borch has called the NRK's investigation, an ethnic investigation. As of Q4 2024, the Sami parliament has not started any process to decide if she should lose any voting privileges.

== Personal life ==
Borch grew up in Lavangen Municipality. In June 2023, she announced that she had entered a relationship with Peter Paulsen, whom she met when celebrating her brother's birthday before Christmas 2022.

Borch married Tromsø restaurant owner Øystein Andreas Jensen in October 2026.

== See also ==
- Guttenberg plagiarism scandal

Political offices
Preceded by Olaug Bollestad	Minister of Agriculture and Food; 2021–2023	Succeeded by Geir Pollestad
Preceded by Ola Borten Moe	Minister of Research and Higher Education; 2023–2024	Succeeded by Oddmund Løkensgard Hoel
Party political offices
Preceded by Johannes Rindal	Leader of the Centre Youth; 2011–2013	Succeeded by Erling Laugsand
