= Henrik Asheim =

Norwegian politician

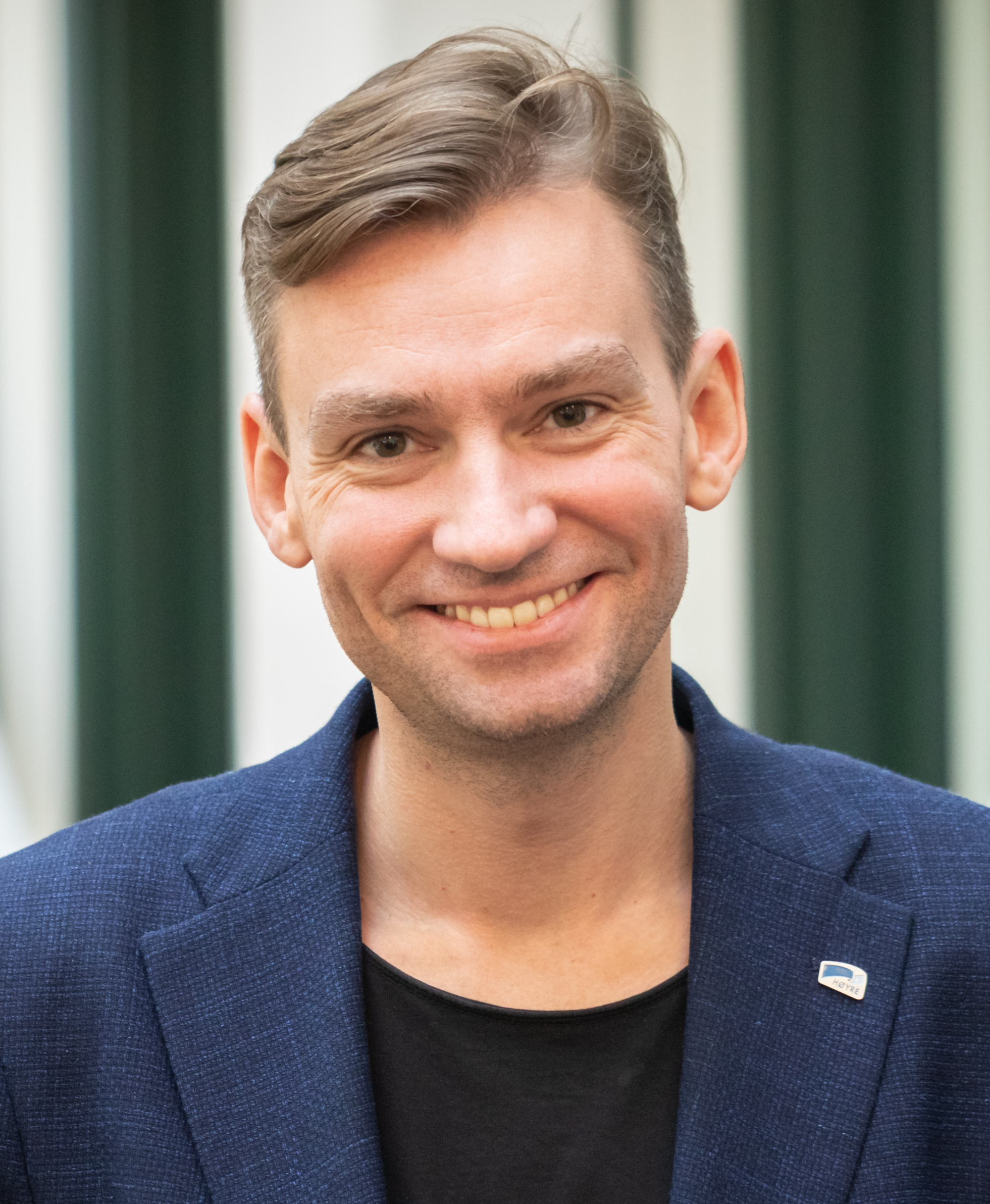
- Asheim in 2019

First Deputy Leader of the Conservative Party
- Incumbent
- Assumed office 3 April 2022
- Leader: Erna Solberg; Ine Eriksen Søreide
- Preceded by: Jan Tore Sanner

Minister of Research and Higher Education
- In office 24 January 2020 – 14 October 2021
- Prime Minister: Erna Solberg
- Preceded by: Iselin Nybø
- Succeeded by: Ola Borten Moe

Minister of Education and Research
- Acting; 15 September 2017 – 26 November 2017
- Prime Minister: Erna Solberg
- Preceded by: Torbjørn Røe Isaksen
- Succeeded by: Torbjørn Røe Isaksen

Leader of the Young Conservatives
- In office 22 June 2008 – 23 June 2012
- First Deputy: Eivind Saga; Rolf Erik Tveten
- Second Deputy: Stefan Heggelund; Camilla Strandskog
- Preceded by: Torbjørn Røe Isaksen
- Succeeded by: Paul Joakim Sandøy

Member of the Norwegian Parliament
- Incumbent
- Assumed office 1 October 2013
- Deputy: Thore Vestby; Anne Kristine Linnestad; Kari Sofie Bjørnsen
- Constituency: Akershus

Personal details
- Born: 21 August 1983 (age 43) Bærum, Akershus, Norway
- Party: Conservative
- Domestic partner: Simon Stisen (2022–present)

Henrik Asheim (born 21 August 1983) is a Norwegian politician for the Conservative Party. He was leader of the Norwegian Young Conservatives from 2008 to 2012, and Minister of Higher Education from 2020 to 2021. He has also been a member of parliament for Akershus since 2013 and the party's first deputy leader since 2022.

== Political career ==
=== Party politics ===
In 2007, Asheim was elected to Bærum municipal council. He was leader of the Norwegian Young Conservatives, the youth wing of the Conservative Party from 2008 to 2012. He had previously been deputy leader between 2007 and 2008.

He was elected the leader of the Bærum Conservatives on 29 November 2021, defeating the incumbent Siw Wikan with 91 votes. He didn't seek re-election in 2023 and was succeeded by Haakon Christopher Sandven on 28 November.

Following Jan Tore Sanner's announcement that he would step down as deputy leader, Asheim was among the favourites to succeed him, alongside Nikolai Astrup and Ine Eriksen Søreide. The latter later announced she wouldn't be seeking the deputy leadership, and Asheim was subsequently designated as first deputy leader on 17 February 2022. He was formally elected at the party conference on 3 April 2022.

He announced his candidacy for the leadership of the party a month after Erna Solberg announced her resignation following the 2025 election. He did however say he would withdraw his candidacy should front runner Ine Eriksen Søreide also seek the leadership, which he ultimately did upon her candidacy announcement on 6 November. The party's election committee designated him to continue in his role as first deputy leader on 11 December, with Søreide as leader and Ola Svenneby as second deputy leader. The trio were formally elected at the party's extrodinary convention on 14 February 2026.

=== Parliament ===
In the 2013 general election, he was elected to the Storting for Akershus. In the Storting, he was a member of the Standing Committee on Education, Research and Church Affairs. He was reelected in 2017 and 2021.

After Nikolai Astrup was appointed to the government on 17 January 2018, Asheim succeeded him as the chair of the Standing Committee on Finance and Economic Affairs. He held this position until he himself was appointed to the government on 24 January 2020, and was succeeded by Mudassar Kapur.

Following the Solberg cabinet's defeat in the 2021 election, Asheim became the Conservative Party's spokesperson for labour and social policy; and Second Deputy Parliamentary Leader. He held the latter post until October 2022, when he was replaced by Jan Tore Sanner.

=== Acting minister of education ===
Asheim served as acting Minister of Education and Research in Solberg's Cabinet from September to November 2017, during Torbjørn Røe Isaksen parental leave.

=== Minister of Higher Education ===
Asheim was appointed minister of higher education on 24 January 2020 after the Progress Party withdrew from government.

After exams where cancelled for the school term 2020-21, Asheim proposed alternatives to still have it, notably oral exams via Skype or home exams for written ones.

On 5 November, Asheim briefed rectors and leaders of universities and colleges of new COVID-19 measures in higher education. One of those measures included more proposed use of digital lessons. He expressed that the sector seemed to take pandemic seriously and did their best to limit the spread of the virus in society.

In March 2021, Asheim proposed an amendment to the University and College Act in the wake of several reports of unfair treatment of students from staff members. He also announced that the government's first action would be to clarify the regulations for universities and colleges, before looking at what could be improved. Asheim added that a hearing for an amendment would quickly scheduled.

When a recording of a Polish professor was leaked, where he said that the Medical University of Gdańsk could benefit from falsely reporting failing students, Asheim called Polish authorities to clear up in the matter after Norwegian students reported the incident. The professor was eventually fired at the end of the month (March 2021), and Asheim praised the university for taking swift action.

After calls from students who expressed that exams should be improved or abolished, Asheim came out against the latter in June. He didn't clarify what the government would do to improve exams, but expressed that there should be variation in exams. He also expressed hope for staff and students to find common ground to improve exams together.

Following the cabinet's defeat at the 2021 election, he was succeeded by Ola Borten Moe on 14 October.

== Personal life ==
Asheim is openly gay. He is currently in a relationship with Simon Stisen, a pastor and member of the Christian Democratic Party; whom he met in July 2021. About half a year after they met, Stisen moved from his native Mandal to live with Asheim.

Party political offices
Preceded by Torbjørn Røe Isaksen	Leader of the Norwegian Young Conservatives; 2008–2012	Succeeded by Paul Joakim Sandøy
Preceded by Siw Wikan	Leader of the Conservative Party in Bærum; 2021–2023	Succeeded by Haakon Christopher Sandven
Preceded by Jan Tore Sanner	First Deputy Leader of the Conservative Party; 2022–present	Incumbent
Political offices
Preceded by Torbjørn Røe Isaksen	Minister of Education and Research; Acting; September–November 2017	Succeeded by Torbjørn Røe Isaksen
Preceded by Nikolai Astrup	Chair of the Standing Committee on Finance and Economic Affairs; 2018–2020	Succeeded by Mudassar Kapur
Preceded by Iselin Nybø	Minister of Research and Higher Education; 2020–2021	Succeeded by Ola Borten Moe
