= May Britt Lagesen =

Norwegian politician

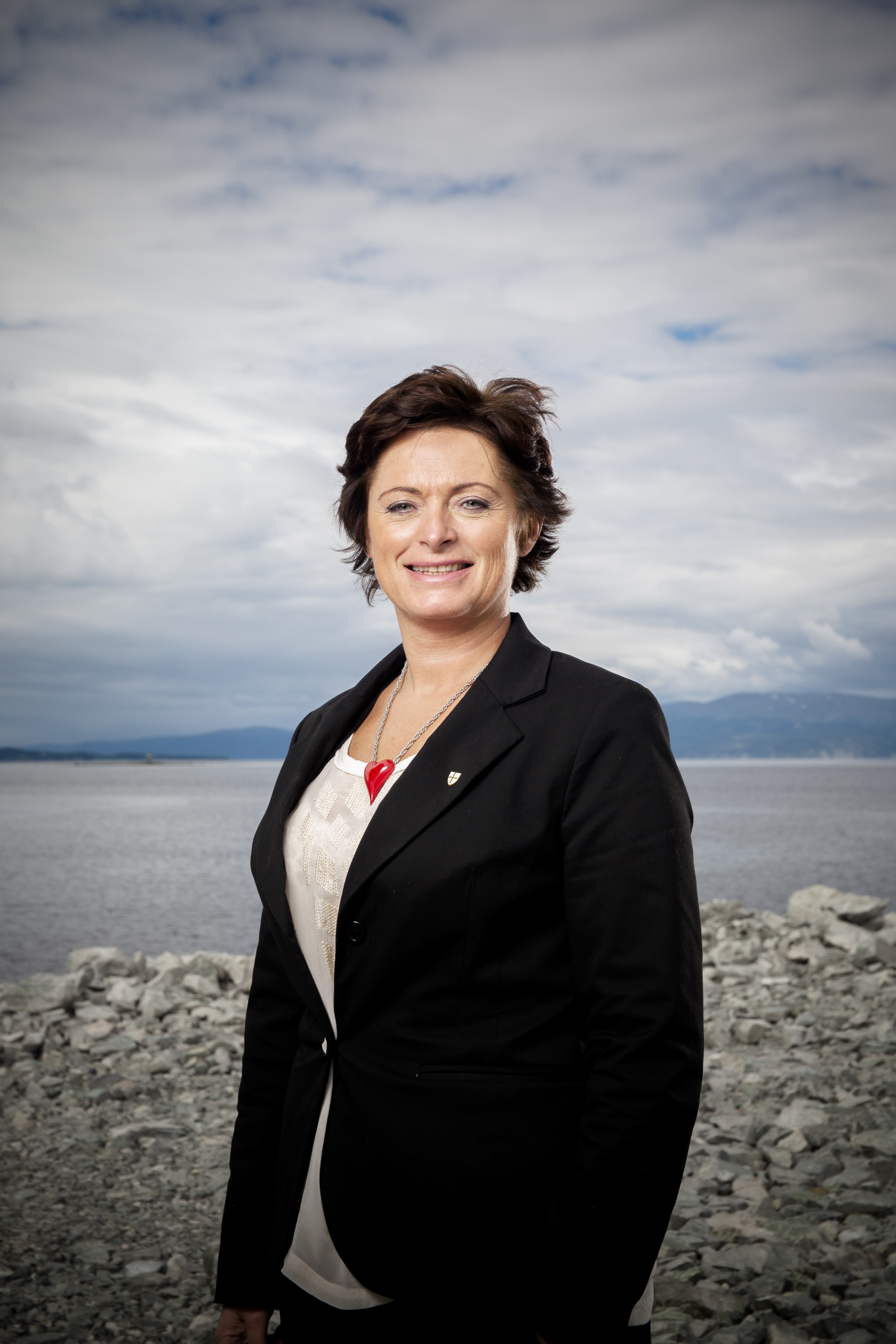
- Born: 18 February 1971 (age 55)
- Occupation: Politician
- Political party: Labour Party

May Britt Lagesen (born 18 February 1971) is a Norwegian politician for the Labour Party. From 2021 she meets regularly at the Storting while Ingvild Kjerkol is government minister.

== Career ==
Lagesen was elected deputy representative to the Storting from the constituency of Nord-Trøndelag for the periods 2013–2017, 2017–2021 and 2021–2025, for the Labour Party. She replaces Ingvild Kjerkol in the Storting from 2021 while Kjerkol is government minister.

She has previously been deputy mayor of Steinkjer Municipality and fylkesråd for the Nord-Trøndelag County Municipality.
