= Sandra Bruflot =

Norwegian politician (born 1991)

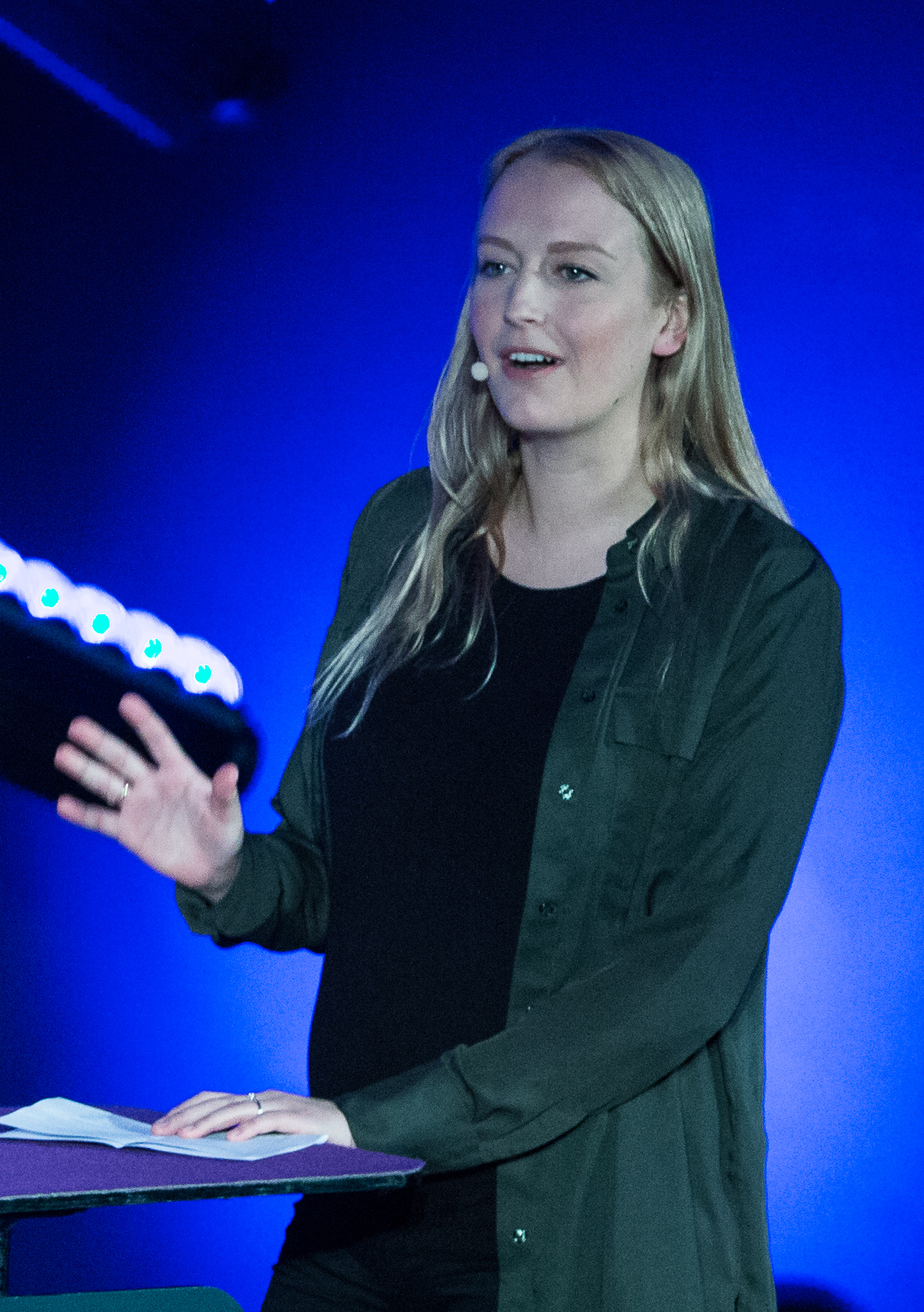
- Born: 31 December 1991 (age 34)
- Occupation: Politician
- Political party: Conservative
- Spouse: Christopher Wand (m. 2018)
- Children: 3

Sandra Bruflot (born 31 December 1991) is a Norwegian politician for the Conservative Party. She represented Buskerud in the Storting from 2021 to 2025 and previously led the Norwegian Young Conservatives between 2018 and 2020.

== Political career ==
Hailing from Lier, Bruflot was a member of the municipal council of Lier from 2011 to 2019, as well of the county council of Buskerud from 2015 to 2019. From 2013 to 2017 she was deputy representative to the Storting. She is member of the county council of Viken from 2019, and was elected representative to the Storting from the constituency of Buskerud for the period 2021–2025, for the Conservative Party. In the Storting, she was member of the Standing Committee on Health and Care Services from 2021. She had sought re-election at the 2025 election, but ultimately lost her seat.

She chaired the Norwegian Young Conservatives from 2018 to 2020, having been vice chair from 2014 to 2018.

In October 2025, she announced her candidacy for the deputy leadership of her party in the wake of the resignation of Erna Solberg the month before and the announcement of Tina Bru not seeking re-election as deputy leader. She was ultimately not chosen to be a part of the new leadership.

== Personal life ==
Bruflot married Christopher Wand in 2018. The couple has three children.

Party political offices
Preceded by Kristian Tonning Riise	Leader of the Norwegian Young Conservatives; 2018–2020	Succeeded by Ola Svenneby
