= Paul Joakim Sandøy =

Norwegian politician

Paul Joakim Sandøy (born 8 May 1987) is a Norwegian politician for the Conservative Party.

Hailing from Molde, he was a member of the municipal council of Molde Municipality from 2007 to 2011. He has been the leader of the Young Conservatives of Molde and deputy leader of the Young Conservatives of Hordaland. He was a member of the central board of the Norwegian Young Conservatives from 2010, and he succeeded Henrik Asheim as leader in 2012. He was succeeded by Kristian Tonning Riise on 21 June 2014.

Sandøy is a law student at the University of Bergen. He is an outspoken supporter of his native Molde football team.

Party political offices
Preceded by Henrik Asheim	Leader of the Norwegian Young Conservatives; 2012-2014	Succeeded by Kristian Tonning Riise
