= Cecilie Myrseth =

Norwegian politician (born 1984)

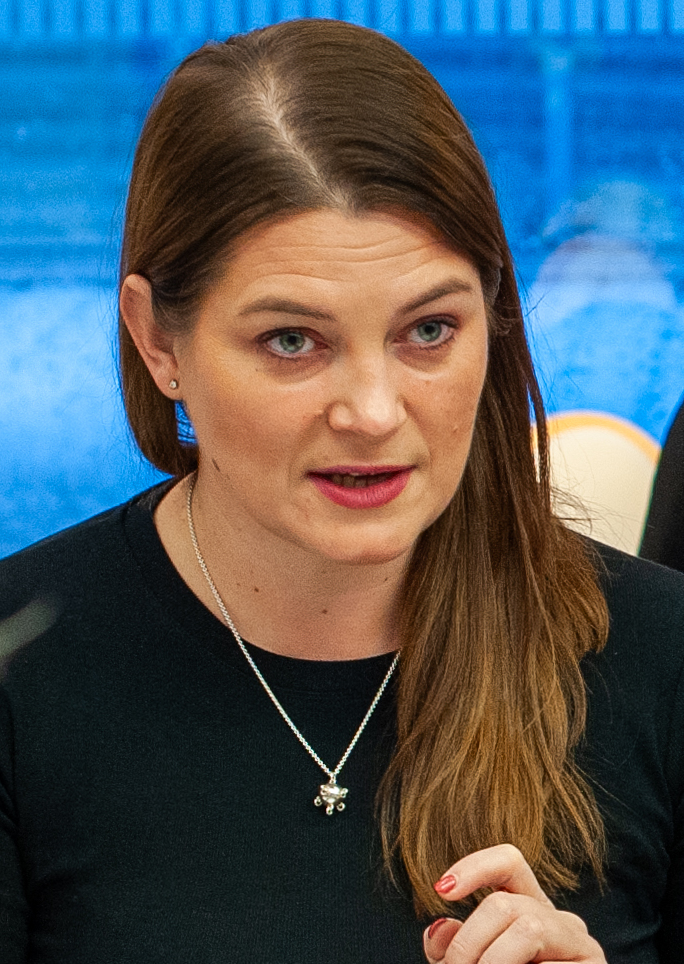
- Myrseth in 2025

Minister of Trade and Industry
- Incumbent
- Assumed office 19 April 2024
- Prime Minister: Jonas Gahr Støre
- Preceded by: Jan Christian Vestre

Minister of Fisheries and Ocean Policy
- In office 16 October 2023 – 19 April 2024
- Prime Minister: Jonas Gahr Støre
- Preceded by: Bjørnar Skjæran
- Succeeded by: Marianne Sivertsen Næss

Member of the Storting
- Incumbent
- Assumed office 1 October 2017
- Deputy: Tom Einar Karlsen
- Constituency: Troms

Chairwoman of the County Cabinet of Troms
- In office 2 October 2015 – 15 June 2017
- Deputy: Ivar B. Prestbakmo
- County Mayor: Knut Werner Hansen
- Preceded by: Line Fusdahl
- Succeeded by: Willy Ørnebakk

Personal details
- Born: 27 July 1984 (age 42) Harstad, Troms, Norway
- Party: Labour
- Education: University of Tromsø
- Occupation: Psychologist; Politician

Cecilie Myrseth (born 27 July 1984) is a Norwegian psychologist and politician for the Labour Party. She is currently the minister of trade and industry since 2024. She also served as minister of fisheries between 2023 and 2024. She is also a member of the Storting for Troms since 2017, and previously chaired the Troms county cabinet from 2015 to 2017.

== Early life ==
Myrseth was born in Harstad on 27 July 1984, and grew up in Lavangen Municipality, Troms. She is the daughter of Lavangen mayor Hege Myrseth Rollmoen, whose father and thereby Myrseth's grandfather, Thorleif Myrseth, also served as mayor on multiple occasions. She graduated as psychologist from the University of Tromsø in 2015.

== Political career ==
=== Local politics ===
Myrseth became the chairwoman of the Troms county cabinet following the 2015 local elections. The Labour Party formed a coalition with the Centre Party, Liberal Party and the Christian Democrats; with the Centre Party's Ivar B. Prestbakmo as deputy chair and County Commissioner for Transport and the Environment. She resigned on 15 June 2017 to run in the 2017 parliamentary election and was replaced by Willy Ørnebakk, the County Commissioner for Health, Culture and Industry.

=== Parliament ===
She was elected member to the Storting for the period 2017–2021, and re-elected in 2021 and 2025. In parliament, she sat on the Standing Committee on Business and Industry from 2017 to 2021. From 2021 to 2023, she sat on the Standing Committee on Health and Care Services, where she also served as first vice chair, concurrently with the Election Committee.

=== Minister of Fisheries ===
Myrseth was appointed minister of fisheries on 16 October 2023 following a cabinet reshuffle. With her appointment, she became the first Labour fisheries minister from Troms since Jan Henry T. Olsen in 1992.

==== 2023 ====
Early into her tenure, Myrseth oversaw the final negotiations with Russia about a new fishery agreement for 2024, which outlined a 20% lower cod quota and also ensuring long-term and sustainable management in the northern area.

In late November, she summoned fish farming companies and supervision agencies to discuss animal welfare after revelations of multiple rule violations had been uncovered the past year. Myrseth expressed that in order to achieve greater growth, an increased focus on climate and animal welfare should be at the forefront.

By early December, Myrseth had finalised negotiations with the European Union and the United Kingdom regarding a fishery agreement for 2024. The agreement with the EU was bilateral and outlined the North Sea, Skagerrak and the neighborhood agreement on fishing by Swedish vessels travelling in the Norwegian zone. The UK agreement served as a part of a three part agreement between them, Norway and the EU, which outlined a quota determination and management of the common stocks in the North Sea.

At the end of the month, she announced that the government would be demanding harsher requirements for fish health and a focus to lower emissions in addition for the industry to have a larger focus on climate, the environment and fish welfare.

==== 2024 ====
In January, she presented the government's new quota message in Tromsø, which notably outlined redistribution of the quota base between large and small vessels in the fishing fleet and would seek to abolish the co-fishing scheme by 2025. Furthermore, the government would seek to introduce ownership restrictions in the coastal fleet, which would see certain large fishing vessels having to sell parts of their quotas.

Myrseth expressed optimism about the government securing regulations for seafarers' salary during the course of the year. In mid-March she met with leaders of the Norwegian Confederation of Trade Unions, Norwegian Seafarers' Union and the Norwegian Maritime Officers' Union to discuss the proposal, with the latter expressing support for the government's quick plan to have the proposal sent to parliament for a six-week hearing right after the Easter break.

=== Minister of Trade and Industry ===
Myrseth was appointed minister of trade and industry on 19 April 2024 following the dismissal of Ingvild Kjerkol in the wake of a plagiarism scandal.

==== 2024 ====
Between 22 and 26 April 2024, she accompanied prime minister Jonas Gahr Støre at the 2024 Hannover Messe. To the media two days in, she expressed that Norway is a good country to reside in, invest and innovate in, referring to Norwegian millionaires who have moved to Switzerland in the last few years.

Myrseth ordered the purchase of the last private property on Svalbard to be bought by the state in July, which came following concerns that China is considered a potential buyer of the property. Furthermore, she cited that the National Security Authority, Norwegian Police Security Service and the Norwegian Intelligence Service's advice that such a purchase could pose a threat to national security interests if the Norwegian state didn't intervene.

She announced in late September that the national export advisory council would get a renewed mandate lasting throughout 2025, instead of ceasing its current mandate by the end of 2024. Myrseth further stated that the government's aim would be to increase Norwegian exports besides petroleum and gas with 50% by 2030 and thereby it was important for actors in the industry and labour sectors to choose export ventures. She also launched four key export promotion initiatives in offshore wind, maritime sector, health, as well as product production and design. Tourism was also added as the fifth initiative.

In preparation for the incoming second Trump presidency, Myrseth expressed in December that the Norwegian government would be seeking to enter dialogue with the United States and being diplomatic, but didn't specify what they would do if Norwegian goods could potentially be affected by import tariffs. She further expressed that it was important for Norway not to end up in a potential crossfire between the United States and the European Union which may negatively affect Norwegian export.

==== 2025 ====
Shortly after the Centre Party's withdrawal from government, Myrseth announced that they would be aiming to implement other EU frameworks like the Critical Raw Materials Act (CRMA) and the Net-Zero Industry Act (NZIA). She argued that the acts would strengthen Norwegian industry and create jobs.

Myrseth represented Norway when visiting Kyiv to sign a new free trade agreement between the EFTA countries and Ukraine in April, which notably saw the inclusion of e-commerce, small and medium sized enterprises and trade and sustainable development. She also hailed the agreement as a "significant step" towards greater Ukrainian integration into the European market.

Myrseth visited Equinor, Kongsberg Gruppen and Norsk Hydro factories and facilities in New York and Pennsylvania in June against the backdrop of Norway negotiating a customs agreement with the United States. She stated that the negotiations were still in an early phase, but emphasised that securing an agreement was an utmost priority and also highlighted the importance of Norwegian industry in the US and corporation.

In October, Myrseth expressed support for Norway likely being given an exception to the European Union's steel tariff. She also visited Washington, D. C. to meet with the US Trade Representative Jamieson Greer to discuss a trade deal between their respective countries.

==== 2026 ====
In March 2026, she signed the cooperation agreement with the European Union on the Secure Connectivity program, which would bring Norway closer to the existing European space cooperation. She highlighted the agreements importance for the country, securing governmental communications, the growth of European autonomy and new opportunities for the Norwegian space industry.

In October, some hotels in Northern Norway criticised the government's municipal hotel tax, which some argued needed to be amended, claiming it would alter the entire economic model for the travel industry. Myrseth claimed the model was widely used across Europe and had little understanding for the argument being made, emphasising that tourists pay for the tax itself and not accommodation locations. She also encouraged constructive dialogue rather then having some actors "putting themselves on the sidelines".

== Personal life ==
She has at least one child, who is a member of the Workers' Youth League and leader of their county chapter of Troms.
