= Sandra Borch and Ingvild Kjerkol plagiarism affair =

Norwegian political scandal

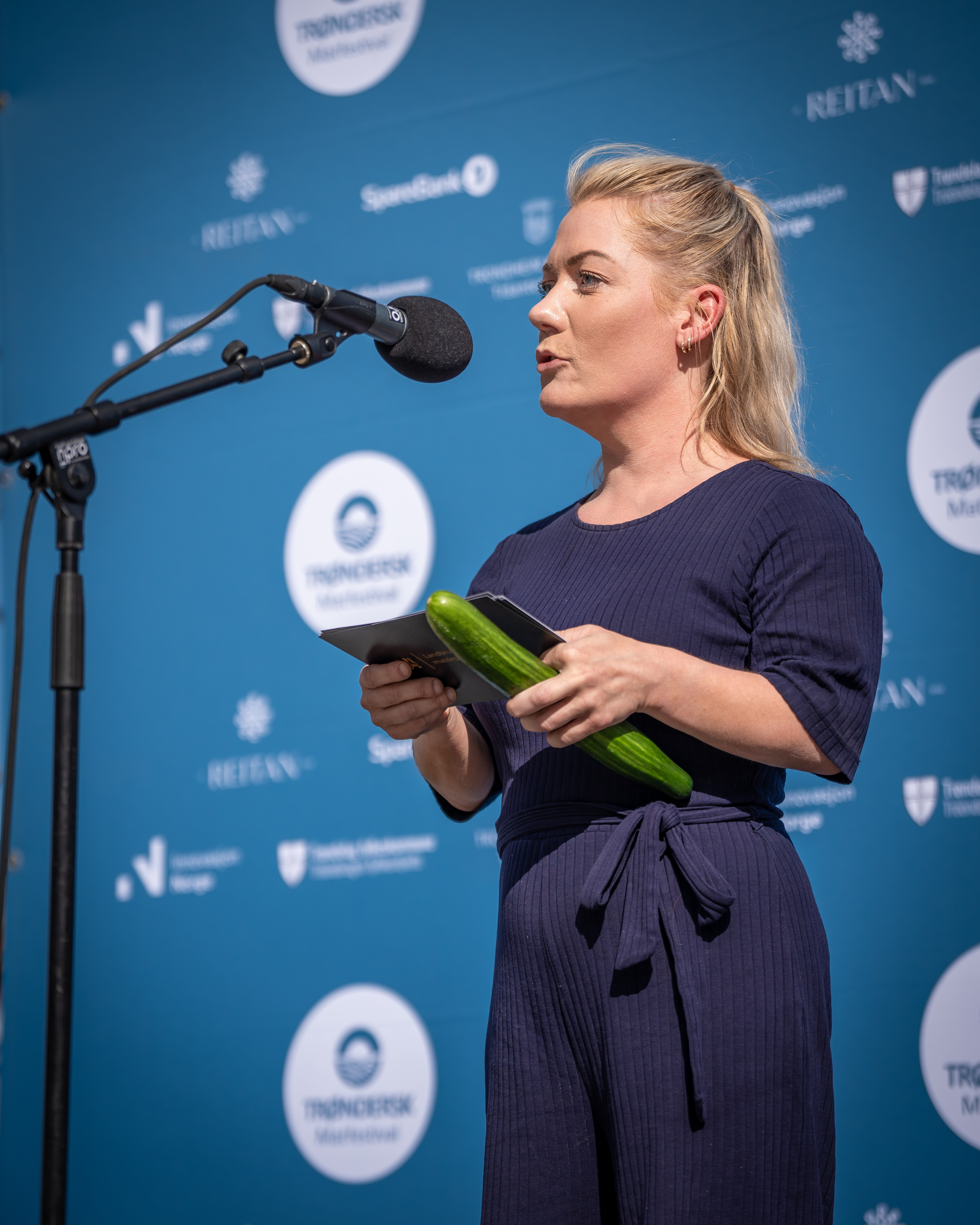
Sandra Borch

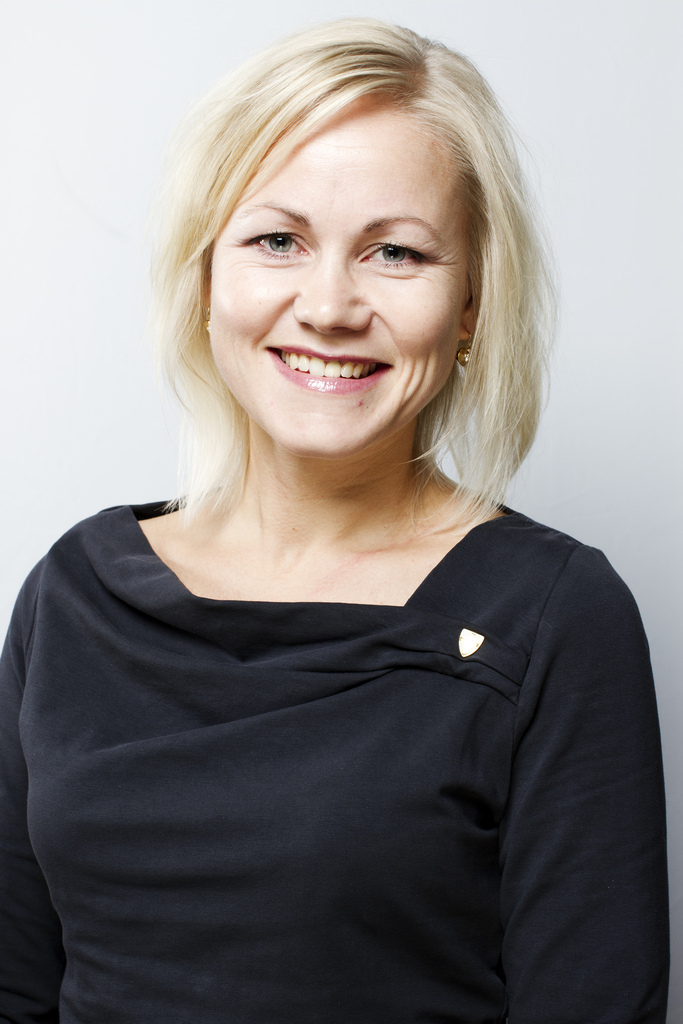
Ingvild Kjerkol

The Sandra Borch and Ingvild Kjerkol plagiarism affair refers to the Norwegian political scandal over two members of the Norwegian government's plagiarism of their master's theses. The affair started on 19 January 2024 when it was revealed that the Minister of Research and Higher Education, Sandra Borch, had plagiarized her master's thesis, resulting in her resignation the same day. The next day it was revealed that the Minister of Health Ingvild Kjerkol had plagiarized parts of her thesis and fabricated interviews with research informants, leading to calls for her resignation.

== Sandra Borch plagiarism affair ==
The first accusations of plagiarism in Borch's thesis were made public on 19 January 2024. Borch completed the professional law programme qualifying her as a lawyer at the University of Tromsø in 2014. Her master's thesis, Sikkerhetsregulering i norsk petroleumsrett: Ivaretakelse av HMS-forpliktelser i rettighetshavergruppen på norsk sokkel (lit. 'Safety regulation in Norwegian petroleum law: Safeguarding HSE obligations in the rights-holder group on the Norwegian continental shelf'), concerned security regulation in the Norwegian petroleum industry. She received the grade D in the ECTS grading scale.

On 19 January 2024 a student posted several excerpts from her thesis on Twitter, showing that they had been plagiarized from two earlier theses submitted to the University of Oslo and the University of Bergen. Later that day the newspaper E24 published an exposé that documented that several parts of the thesis had been plagiarized. In the evening of the same day Borch called a press conference where she announced her resignation. Newspaper Aftenposten reported that Borch told Prime Minister Jonas Gahr Støre that she would resign about an hour after being confronted with the plagiarism accusation.

The following day, E24 published a new exposé that revealed that at least 20% of her thesis had been plagiarized from at least six other master's theses. The same day, Aftenposten documented that an additional 10,000 characters were plagiarized from a report commissioned by the Ministry of Labour and Social Inclusion.

Lawyer and expert on intellectual property law Magnus Stray Vyrje said her plagiarism was "as serious as it can get" and that the withdrawal of her degree is a likely outcome. Law professor Terje Einarsen said Borch's degree could be revoked and she could be suspended from the University of Tromsø for a year as a result of cheating on an exam.

On 14 March, it was announced that her degree would be annulled. Borch stated that she wouldn't object to the verdict.

== Ingvild Kjerkol plagiarism and research fabrication affair ==
The day after Borch's resignation it was revealed that parts of the master's thesis of the Minister of Health Ingvild Kjerkol had been plagiarised, and she was accused of fabricating interviews with research informants.

Kjerkol's master's thesis in the field of "knowledge management" was submitted to Nord University by her and her co-author Kristel Buan Linset, currently headmistress at Hommelvik lower secondary school, in 2021. It was titled Ledelse i en digitalisert hjemmetjeneste: Hvordan påvirker helse- og velferdsteknologi lederfunksjonen i hjemmebaserte tjenester? (lit. 'Leadership in a Digitalized Home Care Service: How Does Health and Welfare Technology Affect the Management Function in Home-Based Services?').

On 11 April 2024, the Joint Complaints Board of Nord University confirmed that the thesis contained "a not insignificant amount of plagiarism", and that this had been done intentionally. As a consequence the degree previously awarded to Kjerkol will be revoked. On 12 April, it was announced that Prime Minister Jonas Gahr Støre was forcing Kjerkol to resign as health minister as a consequence of the affair and subsequent revocation of her degree.

On 2 May, her lawyer announced that Kjerkol would appeal the verdict from Nord University. The Appeals Committee turned down the appeal in October 2024.

== See also ==
- Guttenberg plagiarism scandal
