= Ola Borten Moe =

Norwegian politician (born 1976)

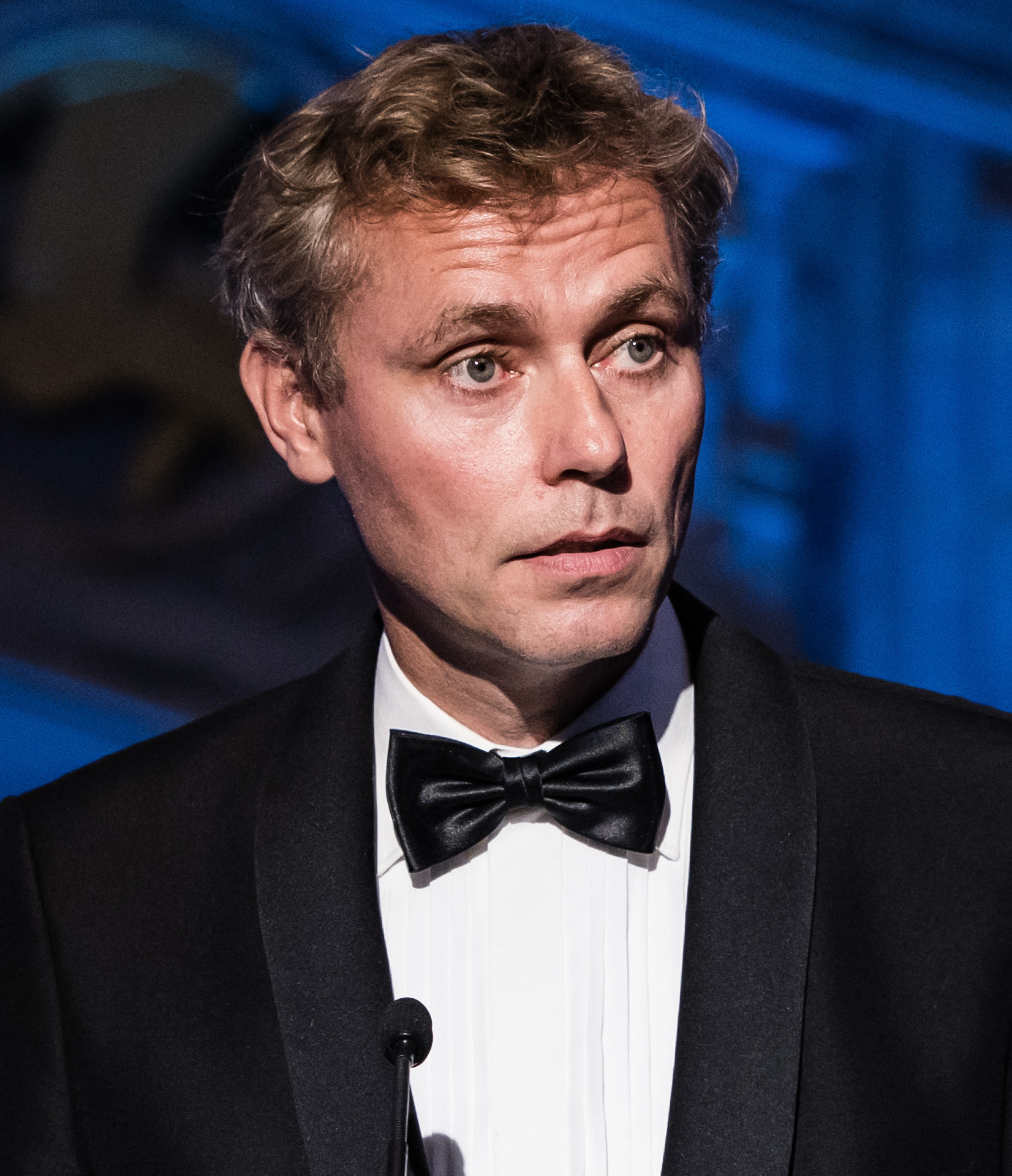
- Borten Moe in 2022

Minister of Research and Higher Education
- In office 14 October 2021 – 4 August 2023
- Prime Minister: Jonas Gahr Støre
- Preceded by: Henrik Asheim
- Succeeded by: Sandra Borch

Minister of Petroleum and Energy
- In office 4 March 2011 – 16 October 2013
- Prime Minister: Jens Stoltenberg
- Preceded by: Terje Riis-Johansen
- Succeeded by: Tord Lien

First Deputy Leader of the Centre Party
- In office 19 March 2011 – 21 July 2023
- Leader: Liv Signe Navarsete; Trygve Slagsvold Vedum
- Preceded by: Lars Peder Brekk
- Succeeded by: Bjørn Arild Gram

Member of the Norwegian Parliament
- In office 1 October 2021 – 30 September 2025
- Deputy: Maren Grøthe
- Constituency: Sør-Trøndelag
- In office 1 October 2005 – 30 September 2013
- Deputy: Heidi Greni
- Constituency: Sør-Trøndelag

Personal details
- Born: 6 June 1976 (age 50) Trondheim, Sør-Trøndelag, Norway
- Party: Centre
- Spouse: Anna Ceselie Brustad Moe (m. 2008)
- Children: 2
- Education: Norwegian University of Science and Technology
- Occupation: Politician
- Profession: Agronomist; Self-employed; Farmer; Political advisor

Ola Borten Moe (born 6 June 1976) is a Norwegian politician for the Centre Party. He was an MP for Sør-Trøndelag from 2005 to 2013 and again from 2021 to 2025. From 2021 to 2023, he served as Minister of Research and Higher Education. He also served as Minister of Petroleum and Energy from 2011 to 2013.

== Early and personal life ==
Borten Moe was born in Trondheim Municipality, Sør-Trøndelag, on 6 June 1976 to farmer Peder O. Moe (born 1948) and nurse Kari Borten (born 1950). He is the grandson of former Prime Minister Per Borten, and married to fellow MP Anna Ceselie Brustad Moe. As of June 2009 they have two children.

== Political career ==
Borten Moe was a member of the Trondheim city council for three four-year terms from 1995 to 2007. He was elected MP of the Norwegian Parliament from Sør-Trøndelag in 2005, after serving as deputy MP from 2001 to 2005. From 2005 to 2007 Borten Moe was a member of the Parliamentary Standing Committee on Energy and the Environment, and from 2007 to 2009 the chairman of the Standing Committee on Business and Industry. Borten Moe was re-elected to the Storting in the 2021 election. In July 2023, he announced that he would not seek re-election at the 2025 election.

Borten Moe was elected the Centre Party's first deputy leader on 19 March 2011. He has been re-elected at every party convention since, but announced he would be stepping down as deputy leader in July 2023. His position remained vacant until it was filled by Bjørn Arild Gram following the 2025 party convention.

=== Ministerial appointments ===
Borten Moe was appointed as Minister of Petroleum and Energy in 2011, and held the post until 2013, when Stoltenberg's Second Cabinet was defeated in that year's election.

Following the 2021 election, he was mentioned as a leading contender to become minister of defence. Former Chief of Defence Harald Sunde endorsed Borten Moe for defence minister, calling him "wise, not afraid and brave" and that he "recognised the core of cases". Borten Moe was instead appointed minister of higher education in Støre's Cabinet.

=== Minister of Petroleum and Energy ===
Borten Moe became the minister of petroleum and energy on 4 March 2011, following Terje Riis-Johansen's resignation.

==== 2011 ====
In September 2011, he chaired an international conference with his international counterparts in Beijing, China, about carbon capture.

Following concerns from a senior advisor at the Norwegian Petroleum Directorate that the Ministry of Petroleum and Energy mixed their role as manager and owner of the Norwegian petroleum fortune, Borten Moe expressed that the ministry knew what its role was. He stated that "here the NPD has an extremely important role. The Directorate does a good job of ensuring that resources are extracted in the best possible way. We place great emphasis on the recommendations from the directorate". The senior advisor in question had further notified the Storting and the Auditor General of Norway. Borten Moe said that the ministry had not been sent letters from the advisor at the time, but that they would answer any questions that could come from the Auditor General.

==== 2012 ====
In November 2012, Borten Moe presented a report about the Lofoten oil field in Svolvær. His report noted that the petroleum field could give up to 1,100 new jobs in both Vesterålen and Lofoten.

==== 2013 ====
Borten Moe met with four students and their teacher from the second year at Stangnes Upper Secondary School, at the annual conference for Norwegian Oil and Gass in late February 2013. The administrative director of Norwegian Oil and Gass, Gro Brækken, described their meeting as "cordially".

After Statoil announced that they would move 1,000 jobs to low cost countries, Borten Moe expressed support for the move in July 2013, and said that the plans were in line with the government's wishes. However, the move caused internal harm for Labour Party and Socialist Left Party, the two other coalition partners.

In September 2013, Borten Moe presented plans to separate the Petroleum Fund's property investments into a separate larger fund. He also expressed that the fund should be administrated from Trondheim. He told the Wall Street Journal that "We want less exposure in bonds and a heavier weighting of real estate", and also stressed that we was referring to the Centre Party, and not the red-green coalition.

=== Minister of Higher Education ===
Borten Moe was appointed minister of higher education on 14 October 2021 in Støre's Cabinet.

==== 2021 ====
Borten Moe stated that students would not be receiving more student requirements for higher student support. He added that the government would be focusing on offering support to students with children, as they view this group as a group they want to help further.

Opposition politicians Henrik Asheim of the Conservative Party and Sivert Bjørnstad of the Progress Party accused the government, and specifically Borten Moe, for overriding the Nord University board's decision to close down the Nesna campus, which the Centre Party had campaigned on to re-establish. Borten Moe explained in an email: "We will now consider in more detail how we can best facilitate a higher education institution at Nesna, with primary and secondary school teacher education. We will also investigate whether we can add other study and education offers there. In addition, the goal is for Nesna to become a center for decentralized and district-oriented education and research."

In November, Borten Moe announced a directive, where he ordered the Research Council of Norway to solve the issue of researchers being unable to start up their projects. This included that the council won't be given more money, and that they have to work within the budget that already is.

On 18 December, Borten Moe and health minister Ingvild Kjerkol announced the government's plan to open 500 new study places for nurses, which would happen by autumn 2022. Borten Moe said: "This is a start. We will see in the future that there will be a heavier emphasis within the disciplines we know that we as a society have great needs for". The move was notably praised by both the Conservative and Progress parties.

==== 2022 ====
Borten Moe announced the government's intention to hand out 170 million NOK for schools and other educational institutions to be able to follow up on their students. He stated: "The pandemic is resilient, and this winter there was more digital teaching and fewer opportunities to meet socially. The effect of the pandemic will also not be over as soon as we reopen. Therefore, the Storting has decided to allocate 170 million NOK to follow up the students academically and socially this year. The goal is that educational institutions and organizations can quickly initiate or extend additional measures to help students".

Borten Moe criticised the NMBU for bringing in PR consultants to work on their goal of sustainability. He expressed agreement with their goals for sustainability, but argued that communications work is not how it is done, but rather through practical work. The NMBU principal, Curt Rice, expressed surprise for the criticism, and advised Borten Moe to not address such an issue to the media. He also notified the ministry of education that he was willing to give a full explanation of the NMBU's deal with communications in their work on sustainability.

On 1 March, Borten Moe met with leaders of universities and colleges to discuss the government's work with Russian authorities. He stressed that measures that the government was taking was aimed at Russian authorities and not the country's citizens, and added it was crucial to maintain connection with Russian society. He also expressed that the education sector had individual cases to handle, notably Norwegian students who had been or is presently in Ukraine, Russia or Belarus.

The Student Society in Trondheim voted with 85 in favour, 1 against and 16 abstaining in a motion of no confidence in Borten Moe as higher education minister. Given that a motion needs to be passed with a 100 votes, the confidence motion was not approved. The vote came in reaction to Borten Moe's announcement of cuts in an NTNU campus project. The Student Society leader, Fredrik Akre, expressed that Borten Moe was responsible for repeated offences of broken promises, while also expressing that Borten Moe had the choice of upholding promises or they would demand him to be replaced. A political advisor for Borten Moe, Signe Bjortveit, responded to the criticism, saying: "I note that the motion for a resolution was not passed, and it was perhaps just as well since the Storting is the only one who can remove ministers. The reason why the ministry has asked NTNU and Statsbygg to study alternatives of smaller scope and price is that the previous government left behind extensive plans with many large construction projects that were to be realized in a short time. The sum of the projects that have been started - or planned to be started - is too large. Our goal is still to move the activity at Dragvoll down to Gløshaugen".

In May, Borten Moe announced major cuts to the Research Council of Norway and shortly after fired the entire board. He reasoned that the council's budget had not been used properly and described their economic situation as "serious". His actions were described as "incomprehensible" and "dramatic" by Dagbladet.

In July, he expressed agreement with his predecessor, Henrik Asheim's criticism of the admission system for higher education and praised him for setting down the commission whose task is to look into the system. Borten Moe stated: "Our admissions system is over-mature for a proper review. It makes no sense that resourceful Norwegian youth spend many years improving their diplomas. It is a massive sub-optimization of community resources".

In late September, Conservative MP Aleksander Stokkebø questioned the partisanship of a committee that was set down to evaluate applications for law education. Borten Moe rejected the criticism and expressed that it was necessary to have professionals in the committee because they have experience from the law education used today. The committee was set down to evaluate applications from the universities of Stavanger, Agder and BI Norwegian Business School to establish master's degrees in legal theory.

In October, following the presentation of the 2023 state budget on the 6th, the opposition parties, notably the Conservatives, Liberals and Progress parties criticised the government for reducing the scholarship for students studying abroad. They also accused the government for creating a class system for only the rich to be able to study abroad. Borgen Moe rejected the criticism, saying: "That's not how it is. We still have very good support schemes for those who want to travel abroad, and the amount of support is the same as before. What we have proposed is to adjust the grant share so that it is the same for students at bachelor's and master's level".

On 1 November, Borten Moe assured that the government was implementing measures to secure Norwegian universities against spies. He also warned the public against raising suspicions against someone without proof, but assured them to be on alert; and to not be paranoid. This was in response to a supposed Brazilian university professor who was arrested in Tromsø, on suspicion of espionage and being a Russian spy.

On 24 November, Borten Moe was declared unwanted on campus by the Student Parliament of the University of Oslo. The Parliament's leader explained that the decision was a protest against the students not being prioritised by the government. Four days later, the University of Bergen student parliament also declared Borten Moe unwanted from their campus, citing them same reasons as Oslo. In addition, Liberal Party deputy leader Abid Raja called on prime minister Støre to reconsider Borten Moe's position given the student's distrust.

==== 2023 ====
In January 2023, he criticised his own government's plans for hydrogen and called them "light years away from being defendable". He faced criticism for his calculations by petroleum and energy minister Terje Aasland and his statement was further denounced by prime minister Jonas Gahr Støre. Borten Moe later took self-criticism for his criticism against the government.

In May, Borten Moe presented a proposal for a new universities and college law to more clearly determine the rules regarding recycling of previous assignments. This came in the wake of a student being suspended for two school terms for this exact reason at a college in Innlandet.

In July, NRK revealed that Borten Moe had appointed "an old acquaintance", Karl Eirik Haug, to the board of the Norwegian Institute of International Affairs in December 2021 and that the Ministry of Education had considered him impartial in the issue. However the nature of the appointment is classified. Borten Moe knew both Haug and his wife Monica Rolfsen, with both he also served with in the Trondheim City Council, and Borten Moe had also attended their wedding. Later that month, on 21 July; E24 revealed that Borten Moe had bought weapons stocks in Kongsberg Gruppen. He also admitted that he had breached the government's guidelines for stock trading and had not considered impartiality in the matter. The National Authority for Investigation and Prosecution of Economic and Environmental Crime announced that they would open an investigation into his dealings. At a press conference the same day, Borten Moe announced that he would resign as higher education minister. He formally resigned on 4 August and was succeeded by agriculture minister Sandra Borch. The National Authority for Investigation and Prosecution of Economic and Environmental Crime dropped the case against Borten Moe in April 2024, citing that they had not found any evidence that would imply insider trading.

== Political views ==
Since the turning towards the left of the Centre Party in the 2000s, Borten Moe is regarded as being among the "centrist" wing of the party, and has been claimed to have the ambition of moving the party back towards the right. He holds many traditional Centre Party issues strongly, such as opposition to the European Union, holding that "I think that we, within the frame of the Norwegian nation state has the opportunity of building a best possible society". He also believes that too much power, funds and competence have been centralised in the area surrounding the capital, Oslo.

In October 2009, he traveled to Denmark to study the asylum policies of the country. He then said that the number of asylum seekers coming to Norway was far too high, and that Norway should learn from the policies of Denmark, and generally tighten the Norwegian asylum policy. In 2010 he said it was extremely important that Norwegians discuss which values Norwegian society should be based on in the future. He stated as the basic foundations: democracy, human rights, respect for individuals and equality between sexes, and considered it dangerous to think about these values as platitudes. He also compared radical Islam to Nazism, and regarding the granting of asylum to terrorists, he questioned if one would have given asylum to extreme-right Germans after World War II when they also risked death penalties in Germany.

Government offices
Preceded by Terje Riis-Johansen	Minister of Petroleum and Energy; 2011–2013	Succeeded by Tord Lien
Preceded by Henrik Asheim	Minister of Research and Higher Education; 2021–2023	Succeeded by Sandra Borch
Party political offices
Preceded by Lars Peder Brekk	First Deputy Leader of the Centre Party; 2011–2023	Vacant Title next held by Bjørn Arild Gram
Political offices
Preceded by Lars Peder Brekk	Chair of the Standing Committee on Business and Industry; 2007–2009	Succeeded by Terje Aasland
Preceded by Øystein Djupedal	Second Vice Chair of the Standing Committee on Scrutiny and Constitutional Affairs; 2009–2011	Succeeded by Per Olaf Lundteigen
