= Sigrun Gjerløw Aasland =

Norwegian politician

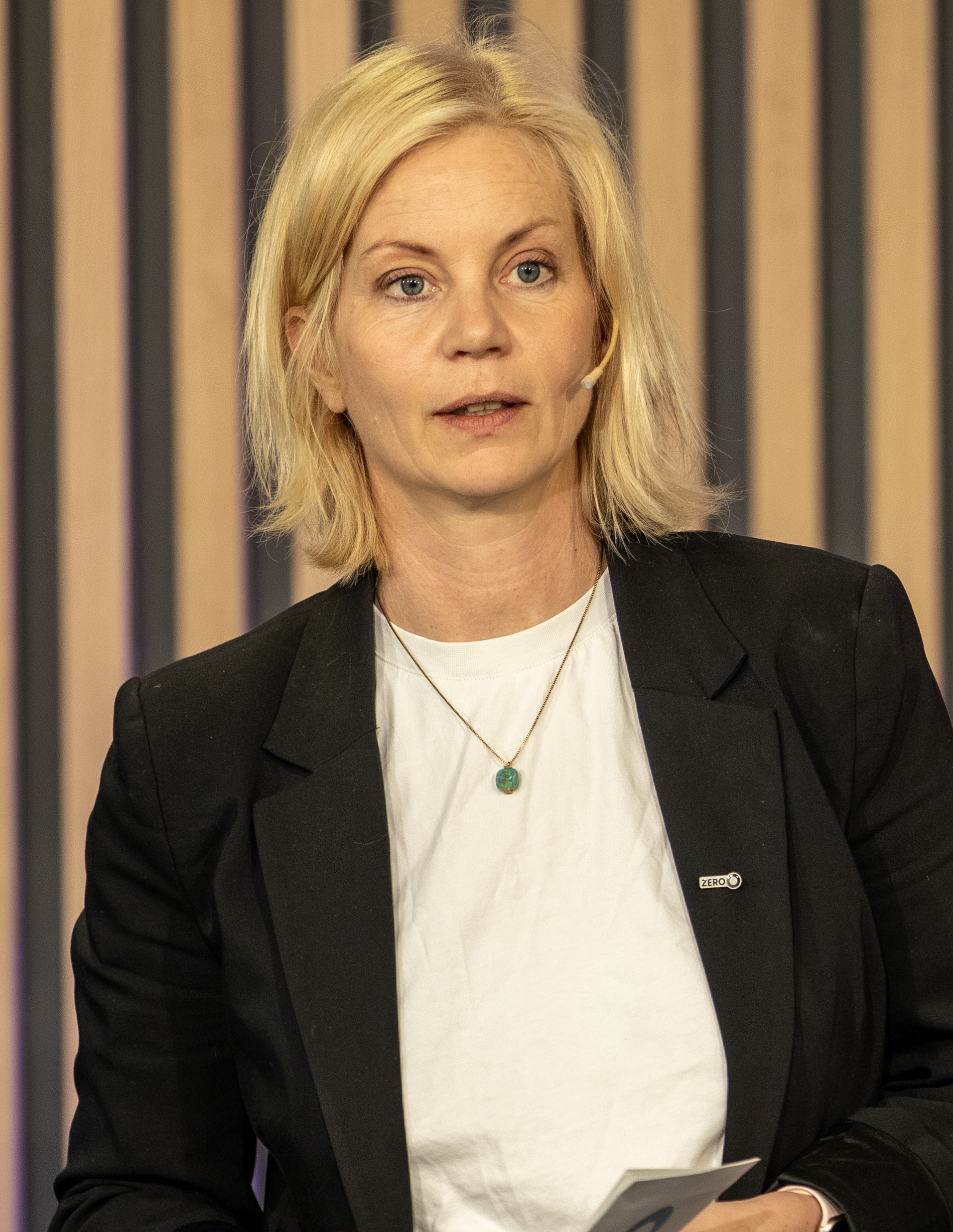
- Aasland in April 2024

Minister of Climate and the Environment
- Incumbent
- Assumed office 11 September 2026
- Prime Minister: Jonas Gahr Støre
- Preceded by: Andreas Bjelland Eriksen

Minister of Research and Higher Education
- In office 4 February 2025 – 11 September 2026
- Prime Minister: Jonas Gahr Støre
- Preceded by: Oddmund Løkensgard Hoel
- Succeeded by: Eileen Fugelsnes

Personal details
- Born: 11 February 1978 (age 48) Grimstad Municipality, Aust-Agder, Norway
- Party: Labour
- Education: Johns Hopkins University; University of Bergen; University of Perpignan
- Occupation: Politician

Sigrun Gjerløw Aasland (born 11 February 1978) is a Norwegian politician for the Labour Party. She has served as Minister of Climate and the Environment since September 2026 and was previously the Minister of Research and Higher Education from February 2025 to September 2026.

== Career ==
From 2021 to 2024 Aasland chaired the environmental organisation ZERO. She was also involved with the think tank Agenda, where she served as its deputy leader. She was appointed State Secretary in the Ministry of Climate and Environment in 2024.

=== Minister of Research and Higher Education ===
Following the Centre Party's withdrawal from government, she was appointed minister of research and higher education on 4 February 2025.

==== 2025 ====
A month into her tenure, Aasland met with representatives of the research sector to discuss and address budget cuts in the sector in the United States. Aasland expressed that the concerns were widespread in particular in the health and climate sectors, citing leading scientists and researchers in the US and that the Norwegian sector also was concerned about fat access and collaboration between the two countries. On the other hand, she couldn't pledge more allocated budget from the government focused on data and science.

Later in March, she announced the establishment of a commission which will look into how artificial intelligence can be better utilised in the higher education sector. In announcing the commission, she stated that she expressed hopes that the commission could provide new rules for how AI could and should be better utilised in the sector. The commission is scheduled to deliver their report by 1 October 2026. The commission delivered their first report in December and notably recommended the removal of home exams in higher education as a measure to counter the usage of AI in the sector. Aasland expressed that it would be up to higher education institutions to implement changes based on the commission's recommendations.

She expressed concerns for the limitation of freedom of expression in the United States in early April and warned Norwegian students of the risk of studying abroad generally speaking, can come with different types of risks compared to studying in Norway. She also expressed that it should be an individual consideration to do so, and further recommended listening to travel advice from Norwegian authorities.

With the government allocating 1.2 billion NOK to artificial intelligence research in June, Aasland hailed the importance of the research, strengthening the sector in the long term and how the government would be aiming to breech the topic offensively.

Weeks before the 2025 parliamentary election, Aasland visited Kristiansand and announced that the government would be setting of budget to open 30 slots for psychology studies at the University of Agder, with the plan for it to come into effect at the 2026 autumn semester.

Aasland announced in October that the government would be putting down a commission whose mission it will be to look into the loan and stipends Norwegian students receive and the economic support for students as a whole, with a report scheduled for 2027. There has long been calls for the economic support scheme for students to be reviewed again and the move was welcomed by the Norwegian Union of Students, who stated that the move was long overdue.

==== 2026 ====
In January 2026, Aasland expressed concerns about the increasing number of students caught cheating on exams with the use of artificial intelligence. She emphasised the importance of such actions receiving consequences, but also noted that the vast majority of students don't cheat on exams. Furthermore, she added that institutions in higher education should follow the recommendations of the Ministry of Education's commission on AI in higher education regarding the matter and that they would work to establish tolerable usage of artificial intelligence in lectures.

In May, she expressed that rectors of universities and university colleges around the country should do more to make campus life more enjoyable for students in order to reduce the burden of digital courses. The Norwegian Student Organisation argued that students are preoccupied with part-time jobs which prevents them from going to campuses, further arguing that the Storting should ensure that students don't lose further purchasing power.

While visiting London in June, Aasland and the UK Minister of State for Skills Jacqui Smith signed a memorandum of understanding aiming to strengthen exchange and research within higher education. Aasland emphasised the importance to increase the mobility from Norway to the UK. While the move was welcomed by the Association of Norwegian Students Abroad, they argued there should also be better conditions for Norwegian students choosing to study in the UK, most significantly regarding students' personal economic hardships.

=== Minister of Climate and the Environment ===
On 11 September 2026, she was appointed Minister of Climate and the Environment in a cabinet reshuffle.

==== 2026 ====
Aasland expressed in November that there was no way around higher prices for wastewater treatment as a consequence for "saving the Oslofjord", arguing that it is being done in several different ways. Also responding to accusations from the mayor of Fredrikstad that the governemnt wasn't doing anything regarding wastewater treatment, she pointed to it being the municipalities' responsibility and that the governemnt had implemented several measures to help them.

== Personal life ==
Born on 11 February 1978, Aasland hails from Grimstad Municipality. She graduated in international economics and conflict management from Johns Hopkins University in 2003. She had also studied at the University of Bergen and the University of Perpignan.

She is the niece of former minister of research and higher education Tora Aasland, who held the position between 2007 and 2012.

== Bibliography ==
- Aasland, Sigrun Gjerløw (2019). Det trengs en landsby. Oslo, Norway: Res Publica. ISBN 9788282260831.
