= Kristian Tonning Riise =

Norwegian politician

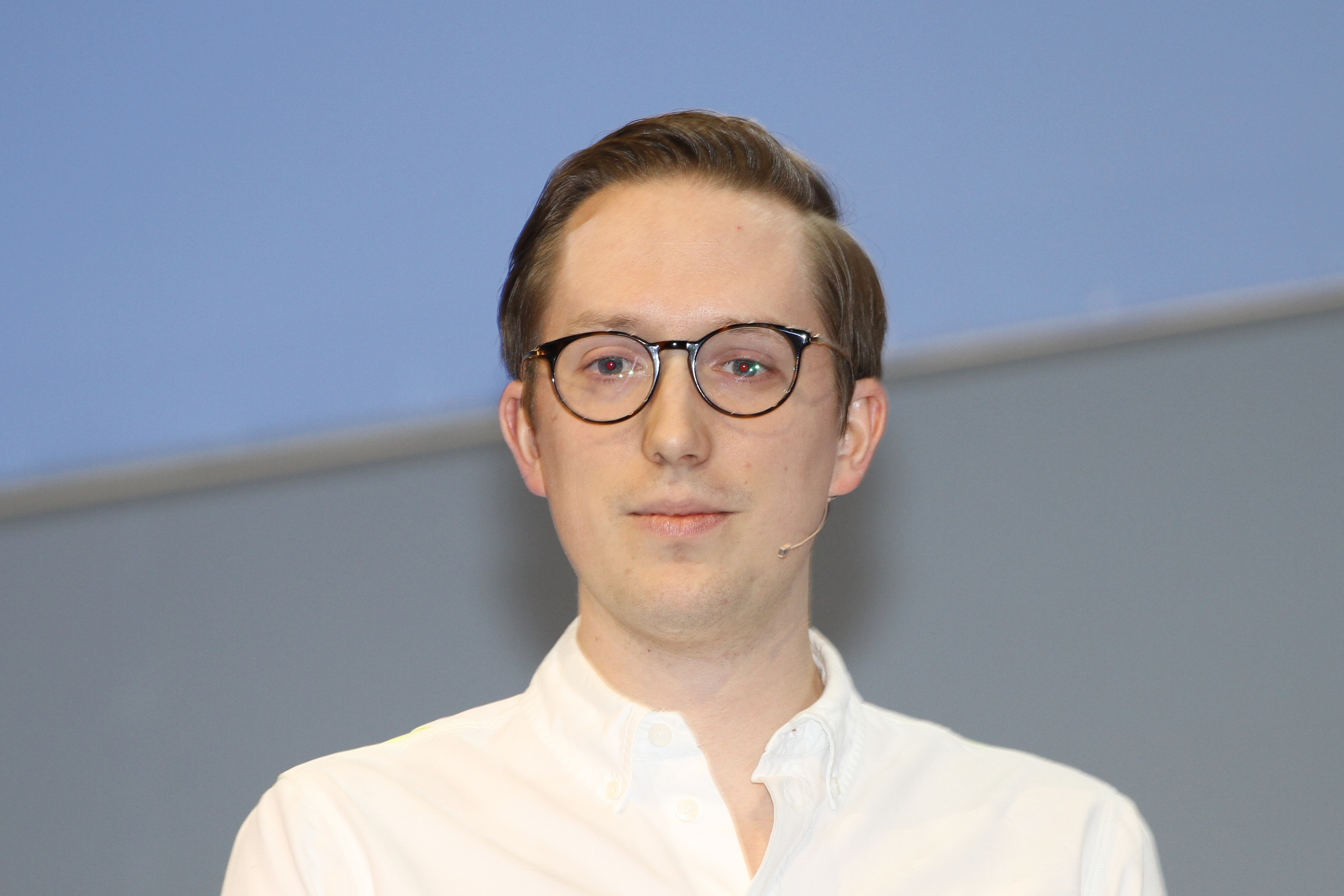
- Riise in 2017

Leader of the Young Conservatives
- In office 21 June 2014 – 9 January 2018
- Preceded by: Paul Joakim Sandøy
- Succeeded by: Sandra Bruflot

Member of the Norwegian Parliament
- In office 9 October 2017 – 30 September 2021
- Constituency: Hedmark

Personal details
- Born: 27 October 1988 (age 37)
- Party: Conservative
- Occupation: Politician

Kristian Tonning Riise (born 27 October 1988) is a Norwegian politician. He was elected as a representative to the Storting for the period 2017–2021 for the Conservative Party.

He was elected leader of the Norwegian Young Conservatives in June 2014. However, he resigned in January 2018 after it was revealed that he had sexually assaulted a 16-year old girl.

In 2013, Riise published a book about Hugo Chávez.
