= Eileen Fugelsnes =

Norwegian politician

Minister of Research and Higher Education
- Incumbent
- Assumed office 11 September 2026
- Prime Minister: Jonas Gahr Støre
- Preceded by: Sigrun Gjerløw Aasland

State Secretary to the Minister of Research and Higher Education
- In office 14 February 2025 – 11 September 2026
- Prime Minister: Jonas Gahr Støre
- Minister: Sigrun Gjerløw Aasland
- Preceded by: Signe Bjotveit
- Succeeded by: Ida Pinnerød

Personal details
- Born: 12 October 1970 (age 56) Bergen, Hordaland, Norway
- Party: Labour
- Education: University of Bergen; BI Norwegian Business School

Eileen Fugelsnes (born 12 October 1970) is a Norwegian politician and associate professor who has served as the Minister of Research and Higher Education since September 2026. A member of the Labour Party, she previously served as the State Secretary to her predecessor from 2025 to 2026.

== Academic career ==
Fugelsnes has a bachelor's degree in comparative politics from the University of Bergen and a doctoral degree from the BI Norwegian Business School.

Fugelsnes works as an associate professor at the BI Norwegian Business School, teaching in political economy and economic history. She is currently on leave from her position since being appointed to government.

== Political career ==
=== Local government ===
Fugelsnes served as chief of staff to the Governing Mayor of Oslo, Raymond Johansen, from 2021 to 2023.

=== State Secretary ===
Following the Centre Party's withdrawal from government in February 2025, Fugelsnes was appointed state secretary to the Minister of Research and Higher Education, Sigrun Gjerløw Aasland. Upon her own appointment as minister, Fugelsnes was succeeded by former Bodø Municipality mayor Ida Pinnerød.

=== Minister of Research and Higher Education ===
She was appointed Minister of Research and Higher Education in a cabinet reshuffle on 11 September 2026, succeeding Sigrun Gjerløw Aasland.

==== 2026 ====
Early into her tenure, Fugelsnes faced backlash over sowing doubt of Norwegian participation in Horizon Europe, saying it "shouldn't be at all costs", and later for suggesting that the Kilden gender research centre should be closed by 2028, a move which was also included in the government's 2027 budget. Supporting parties of the government called the move Trumpian, while Fugelsnes argued that the government wasn't rejecting the entire research field into gender, instead citing overcapacity as a reason for the proposed move.
