= Ingvild Kjerkol =

Norwegian politician (born 1975)

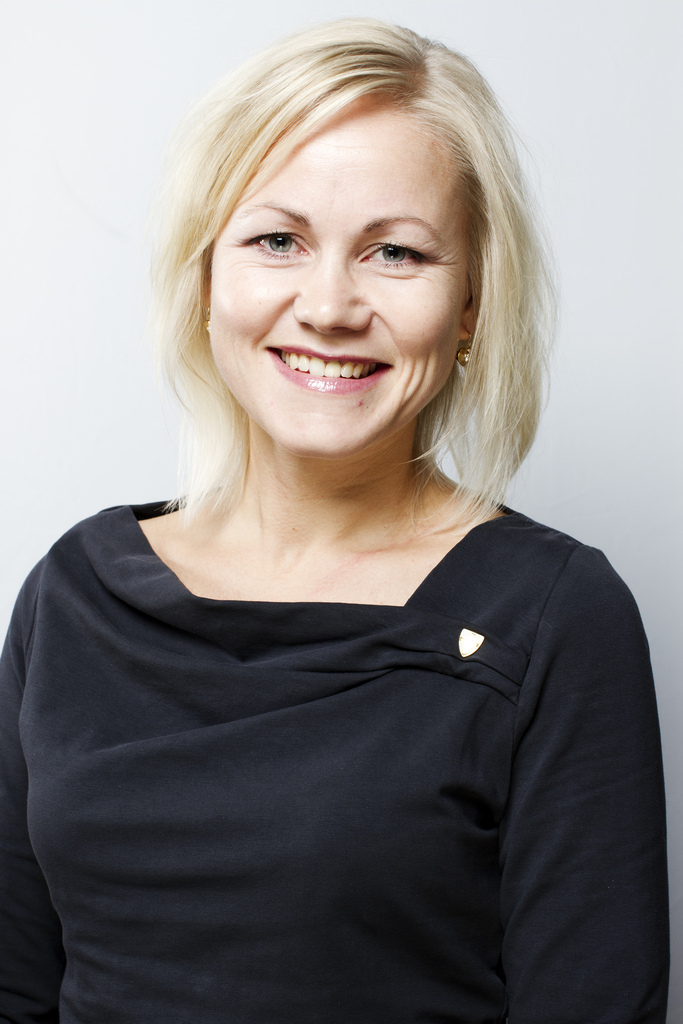
- Kjerkol in November 2011

Minister of Health and Care Services
- In office 14 October 2021 – 19 April 2024
- Prime Minister: Jonas Gahr Støre
- Preceded by: Bent Høie
- Succeeded by: Jan Christian Vestre

Member of the Storting
- In office 1 October 2013 – 30 September 2025
- Deputy: May Britt Lagesen
- Constituency: Nord-Trøndelag

Leader of the Nord-Trøndelag County Council
- In office 18 October 2011 – 13 June 2013
- Preceded by: Alf Daniel Moen
- Succeeded by: Anne Marit Mevassvik

Deputy Member of the Storting
- In office 1 October 2005 – 30 September 2013
- Constituency: Nord-Trøndelag

Personal details
- Born: 18 May 1975 (age 51) Stjørdal, Nord-Trøndelag, Norway
- Party: Labour
- Spouse: Rune Øyan
- Children: 3
- Education: Nord University (Master's thesis annulled, degree withdrawn); Norwegian University of Science and Technology; Sør-Trøndelag University College
- Occupation: Politician

Ingvild Kjerkol (born 18 May 1975) is a Norwegian politician. A member of Labour Party, she was elected to the Parliament of Norway from Nord-Trøndelag first time in 2013, and re-elected in 2017 and 2021. She has been a member of the Standing Committee on Transport and Communications, and of the Standing Committee on Health and Care Services. From 2021 to 2024, she served as minister of health and care services.

In early spring 2024, Kjerkol was accused of plagiarizing and fabricating parts of her master's thesis, leading to calls for her resignation. On Wednesday 10 April 2024, Nord University revoked her master's degree in leadership in the healthcare sector, and in a Friday press conference the prime minister announced her dismissal from her position.

== Personal life ==
Kjerkol was born in Stjørdal Municipality on 18 May 1975, and is a daughter of psychologist Ole Meier Kjerkol and nurse Bodil Johanne Kjerkol. She studied psychology and informatics at the Norwegian University of Science and Technology and at the Sør-Trøndelag University College. She is married to Rune Øyan, with whom she has three children.

== Political career ==
=== Local politics ===
Kjerkol was a member of the municipal council of Stjørdal Municipality from 1995 to 2011. She was a member of the Nord-Trøndelag County Municipality from 2003 to 2013, and chaired the county cabinet from 2011 to 2013.

In August 2020, she was elected leader of the Trøndelag Labour Party, with Amund Hellesø and Eva Kristin Hansen as deputy leaders. She announced in January 2025 that she wouldn't seek re-election to the position at the county party convention in March and was succeeded by Hellesø.

=== Parliament ===
She was a deptuty representative to the Storting from the constituency of Nord-Trøndelag for the periods 2005–2009 and 2009–2013, for the Labour Party. She was elected ordinary representative to the Storting in 2013, where she was member of the Standing Committee on Transport and Communications from 2013 to 2015, and the Standing Committee on Health and Care Services from 2015 to 2017. She was also a member of the Election Committee from 2013 to 2017, and of the Preparatory Credentials Committee in 2017. From 2016 to 2017 she was a delegate to the United Nations General Assembly.

She was re-elected to the Storting for the period 2017–2021, and was a member of the Standing Committee on Health and Care Services during the whole period, as well of the Election Committee and the Credentials Committee. She was again re-elected to the Storting for the period 2021–2025. Following her departure as minister in April 2024, she was elected chair of the Standing Committee on Energy and the Environment.

She had sought re-election for the 2025 election, but lost renomination to former Lierne Municipality mayor Bente Estil at the county chapter nomination convention in November 2024.

Following the Centre Party's withdrawal from government in February 2025, she and Tuva Moflag became deputy parliamentary leaders.

=== Minister of Health and Care Services ===
Kjerkol was appointed as Minister of Health and Care Services under Norwegian prime minister Jonas Gahr Støre's Cabinet on 14 October 2021.

On 28 October 2021, Kjerkol announced that national restrictions against COVID-19 pandemic would not be implemented, further saying that local restrictions and guidelines were sufficient for the time being. Later that day, at a press conference with Camilla Stoltenberg and Espen Rostrup Nakstad, Kjerkol said that if the situation deteriorates, the government will use all the tools necessary. She also mentioned that the government is specifically monitoring hospitalisations and the pressure on public health service carefully. Furthermore, Kjerkol mentioned that notable restrictions that would be continued, were travel restrictions to limit import infection, and the current TISK (testing, isolation, infection tracing, and quarantine) scheme. She reiterated that local health authorities should follow the situation closely and initiate restrictions if there should be cause for concern.

On 4 November of the same year, Kjerkol reiterated that the municipalities should take a rapid action against COVID-19 should it occur locally. She also announced that nurses, who work closely with patients, will be offered a third vaccine dosage. Kjerkol said this decision was made due to it being important to protect the frontline. Regarding temporary transfer of health personal from eastern to northern parts of Norway, Kjerkol said this could be expanded to include other health personal groups, but it would be pending on the local situation or increased knowledge of their respective fields. At six days later, Kjerkol said that COVID-19 measures (including COVID-19 passport) has increased including testing and travel entry measures were being considered. She also stated that health authorities were considering other measures, as well as situation progresses.

On 29 November of the same year, Kjerkol joined Norwegian prime minister Jonas Gahr Støre and cabinet were announced that the country take a measures against COVID-19 Omicron variant. Although these measures included: Isolation period extended to seven days, and ten days quarantine for members of a household and close contacts. Kjerkol also stated that the variant gave reason for higher vaccination rate and that vaccination had to be prioritised. On 7 December of the same year, as Norwegian government presented new COVID-19 measures, Kjerkol stated that COVID-19 measures notably were prevent the spread of Deltacron hybrid variant that is combined of Delta and Omicron mutations. However, Kjerkol also said: "COVID-19 measures were introduced to slow the spread of Deltacron. We don't know now whether Deltacron variant will increase admissions further. But these measures will give us time to gain more knowledge about Deltacron variant's infectivity and severity, and to get vaccinated".

On 13 December of the same year, at the press conference with Jonas Gahr Støre and Tonje Brenna, Kjerkol announced that Norwegian Army had been asked to assist with vaccination in municipalities who required it. She went on to say: "It was especially important that everyone over 60 plus older people at high risk of serious illness are vaccinated with a refresher dose as soon as possible, within the set vaccination interval. We also must try to reach as many people as possible who had not previously been fully vaccinated. Today, the interval between two doses and a refresher dose has been changed to 4.5 months for everyone who is recommended a refresher dose". She also stressed that it was important for municipalities and hospitals to vaccinate their own personnel at a higher rate.

On 21 December of the same year, at a press conference, Kjerkol was open to reintroduce COVID-19 certificate sometime after Christmas, but also to more extensive usage. She also said that legislation for this would be put out on consultation in January 2022.

In early January 2022, Progress Party's spokesperson for health policy, Bård Hoksrud, criticised the government for not allowing municipalities to allow veterinarians, pharmacies and other private operators to assist with vaccinations. Kjerkol responded saying that the government had allowed pharmacies to vaccinate, in addition to health forces from Norwegian Army. She did however point out that veterinarians didn't have the license to put vaccines in humans. On 13 January of the same year, Norwegian government made a few adjustments to existing measures while also lifting a few days later. Kjerkol announced that tracing now should be done individually, and close contacts need to notify each other if one tests positive. She also vowed that they will protect the health service and keep the pandemic under control. When asked why municipalities should be allowed to decide the level of measures in schools, but not how long they should serve alcohol, Kjerkol responded: "We want to create limited mobility and contact between adults, through a nationally regulated serving time. This is based on infection control, and part of a package of measures that overall gives us less mobility and less contact".

In February of the same year as COVID-19 Deltacron infection falls, Kjerkol announced that Norway would remove all COVID-19 restrictions, and also with immediate effect, there would no longer be any requirements for vaccination certificates or testing when the country had entered the transition to living with endemic phase. Previously, requirements to fill out a digital registration from prior to arrival have been also removed. While the removal of travel restrictions will delight tourists hoping to visit this country, Norwegian government announced removal of all restrictions that is being celebrated across this nationwide. Also, the change follows similar moves by 2 Scandinavian neighboring countries, Denmark and Sweden, in recent days.

On 18 November of the same year during the endemic period, Kjerkol announced that 18 to 64-year-old people would be offered a refresher vaccine dose.

In November 2023, Norwegian Ministry of Health and Care Services passed a motion to remove COVID-19 as an infectious disease to the public. Kjerkol herself praises the decision and hailed it a step towards normalisation in accordance with the government's strategy and readiness plans.

==== 2021 ====
Following the attack in Kongsberg, Kjerkol expressed that the health services weren't good enough when faced to handle sick people who may be dangerous. She also mentioned she had brought up with the minister of justice on how the cooperation between the police and health services are like.

On the issue of eating disorders, Kjerkol announced that a plan to assist people with said issues and further mental health would be necessary. She also said it was necessary to increase the special health service and municipalities' services regarding eating disorders.

On 18 December, Kjerkol and higher education minister Ola Borten Moe announced the government's plan to open 500 new study places for nurses, which would happen by autumn 2022. Kjerkol said: "We lack quite a few nurses both in the municipalities and in the hospitals. And then we lack specialist nurses. Here we are talking about several thousand nurses we would like to have in service". The move was notably praised by both the Conservative and Progress parties.

==== 2022 ====
In April, Kjerkol didn't rule out that discrimination could happen in the health service when it came to gynaecology treatment of women in comparison to men. She also referred to a committee that had been established to find out if diseases that affect women are being treated differently then those that affect men.

In May, Kjerkol asked for inputs for an abortion issue commission that had been set down to look into the largest changes made to the abortion law. The inputs in question were primarily who should sit on the commission, with experiences in different fields regarding abortion.

In the wake of revelations by Aftenposten showing that mentally ill children were not receiving necessary care and treatment by children's welfare services, Kjerkol stated that said children would be prioritised and have an equal right to treatment. She also urged the regions to prioritise children and youth, while it also being important for health services to be able to reach children, including those in institutions.

In August, when revelations emerged that Støre had seen a private doctor, Kjerkol refused to comment. The Red Party went out against this and called it troubling that the government vowed to focus on public health services while the prime minister himself utilised private services.

In September, she stated that hotline and health services should be improved in order to help young people who are leaning towards suicide. She also called for a "build down" on taboos and stigmas and openness around people who lean towards suicide. Kjerkol stated: "It is important to counteract stigma and taboos, so that more people dare to be open about what is difficult. The men's role commission will look at how boys grow up, also when it comes to the situation of queers who struggle to stand out and experience an additional burden to be themselves".

Back in July 2022, Ukraine had asked Norway to take in injured soldiers. The process was described as being slow and bureaucratic, and only in September was the request accepted. However during the request's evaluation, the process of taking in injured soldiers was temporarily halted. On 11 October, Kjerkol confirmed that the Ministry of Health and Care Services had taken a long time to consider Ukraine's demand. She also assured that the Ministry's routines would be looked into in order to treat requests faster in the future.

Kjerkol faced criticism from her own party and government partner, the Centre Party, for the government's proposal of cutting investment grants to build new care homes for elderly people and people with development disabilities. Kjerkol emphasised that they would not stop with construction, but that the government instead had prioritised general practitioners (GP), hospitals and mental health in the 2023 budget.

On 1 December, Kjerkol ruled out looking further into whether or not ritual circumcision of boys is in violation of human rights, which had been brought up by the Norwegian Red Cross.

==== 2023 ====
In January 2023, Kjerkol announced that a panel for patients would be established and consist of nine members of different genders and age demographics. The panel, according to her, was established with the aim of improving the participation patients have in the ministry's work.

NRK revealed in January how many elders were not treated properly at home at a regular basis, furthermore how care workers in care homes had to exceed their work hours to compensate for staff shortages. In response, Kjerkol called for people to take greater care of their own aging process and for municipalities to get a better grasp of elderly care. Despite this, she faced public criticism for her inaction on the issue, also from the opposition and celebrities like Lise Fjeldstad. Former party official Svein Fjellheim called on Kjerkol to resign, and received support from former Oslo city commissioner Gro Balas.

In June, she together with the Norwegian Directorate of Health announced that blood donation rules would be changed to allow homosexual couples to also donate blood. The change will be effective from 1 January 2024.

TV2 revealed in August that 2998 people were waiting for short-term and long-term stays in nursing homes as well as 24-hour care homes. Additionally that the number of rejections for places in nursing homes and 24-hour care homes had increased by 34% in just three years. Sylvi Listhaug of the Progress Party asked Kjerkol about the issue during a question time in October. Kjerkol assures that the government was working to build 1500 new care home placements as allocated in the 2024 state budget.

In November, an evaluation of hospitals and emergency rooms set down by Kjerkol the year before notably recommended closing down the emergency hospital in Lofoten, which sparked outrage in the local community. Kjerkol commented that the health sector's situation in Northern Norway was severe and called for public input for the final draft that the Northern Norway Regional Health Authority would send to her by April 2024.

==== 2024 ====
In January, following prolonged public outrage of the possibility of closing down emergency rooms and hospitals around Lofoten and Narvik, Kjerkol announced that the services in said areas would prevail and not be impacted by the evaluation.

In the wake of the plagiarism case of minister of research and higher education Sandra Borch, it was revealed that significant portions of text in Kjerkol's Master's thesis from 2021 were identical to text in previous theses.

With more nurses earning more from self-employment through employment agencies, Kjerkol stated in February that it was "a big challenge" and that it challenged the Norwegian labour model.

In March, Kjerkol expressed support for education minister Kari Nessa Nordtun's proposal of community service for youths. She suggested that some of said service could allow youths to work in the health sector.

Kjerkol announced in April that the government would be presenting a new abortion law, which would allow abortion in the eighteenth week. The existing law allows abortions until the twelfth week, with wishes for abortions after the fact needing to be approved by a medical tribunal.

On 12 April, Prime Minister Jonas Gahr Støre announced her dismissal as health minister as a consequence of the plagiarism in her master's thesis and her master's degree being revoked. She was succeeded by trade minister Jan Christian Vestre on 19 April.

== Plagiarism affair ==
In January 2024, she was accused of plagiarizing and fabricating parts of her master's thesis, leading to calls for her resignation. On 10 April 2024, the Joint Complaints Board of Nord University confirmed that they found parts of the thesis to have been plagiarized. As a consequence her master's degree from the university will be revoked. Prime Minister Jonas Gahr Støre announced her dismissal in a press conference on 12 April.

On 2 May, her lawyer announced that Kjerkol would appeal the verdict from Nord University.

Political offices
Preceded by Marianne Sivertsen Næss	Chair of the Standing Committee on Energy and the Environment; 2024–2025	Succeeded by Mani Hussaini
Preceded by Bent Høie	Minister of Health and Care Services; 2021–2024	Succeeded by Jan Christian Vestre
Preceded by Alf Daniel Moen	Leader of the Nord-Trøndelag County Council; 2011–2013	Succeeded by Anne Marit Mevassvik
Party political offices
Preceded by Lene Vågslid; Åsmund Grøver Aukrust	Deputy Parliamentary leader of the Labour Party; 2025; Served alongside: Tuva Moflag	Succeeded by Rune Støstad
Preceded by N/A	Leader of the Trøndelag Labour Party; 2020–2025	Succeeded by Amund Hellesø
