= Camilla Strandskog =

Norwegian politician

Camilla Strandskog (born 4 December 1984), is a Norwegian politician for the Conservative Party.

She served as a deputy representative to the Parliament of Norway from Oslo during the terms 2013–2017 and 2017–2021. From 2015 to 2018 she was a part of Solberg's Cabinet as political adviser in the Ministry of Trade and Fisheries.
