= Minister of Research and Higher Education =

Norwegian cabinet position

Minister of Research and Higher Education of Norway
- Forsknings- og høyere utdanningsminister
- Incumbent; Eileen Fugelsnes since 11 September 2026
- Ministry of Education and Research
- Member of: Council of State
- Seat: Oslo
- Nominator: Prime Minister
- Appointer: Monarch; With approval of Parliament
- Term length: No fixed length
- Constituting instrument: Constitution of Norway
- Formation: 18 October 2007
- First holder: Tora Aasland
- Deputy: State secretaries for the Minister of Research and Higher Education
- Website: Official website

The Minister of Research and Higher Education (Bokmål: Forsknings- og høyere utdanningsminister, Nynorsk: Forskings- og høgare utdanningsminister) is a councilor of state in the Ministry of Education and Research. The incumbent minister is Eileen Fugelsnes of the Labour Party who has served since September 2026.

The post was originally established in 2007, before its responsibilities were transferred to the Ministry of Culture in 2012. The post was re-established when the Liberal Party joined the Solberg Cabinet in 2018.

== Ministers ==
Key
Centre Party
Conservative Party
Labour Party
Liberal Party
Socialist Left Party

Photo	Name	Party	Took office	Left office	Tenure	Cabinet	Ref
	Tora Aasland	Socialist Left	18 October 2007	23 March 2012	4 years, 157 days	Stoltenberg II	
Abolished between 2012 and 2018
	Iselin Nybø	Liberal	17 January 2018	24 January 2020	2 years, 7 days	Solberg	
	Henrik Asheim	Conservative	24 January 2020	14 October 2021	1 year, 263 days	Solberg	
	Ola Borten Moe	Centre	14 October 2021	4 August 2023	1 year, 294 days	Støre	
	Sandra Borch	Centre	4 August 2023	23 January 2024	172 days	Støre	
	Oddmund Løkensgard Hoel	Centre	23 January 2024	4 February 2025	1 year, 12 days	Støre	
	Sigrun Gjerløw Aasland	Labour	4 February 2025	11 September 2026	1 year, 219 days	Støre	
	Eileen Fugelsnes	Labour	11 September 2026	present	0 days	Støre	

== See also ==
- Minister of Education (Norway)
