= Solberg cabinet =

Government of Norway from 2013 to 2021

Solberg's Cabinet
- Cabinet of Norway

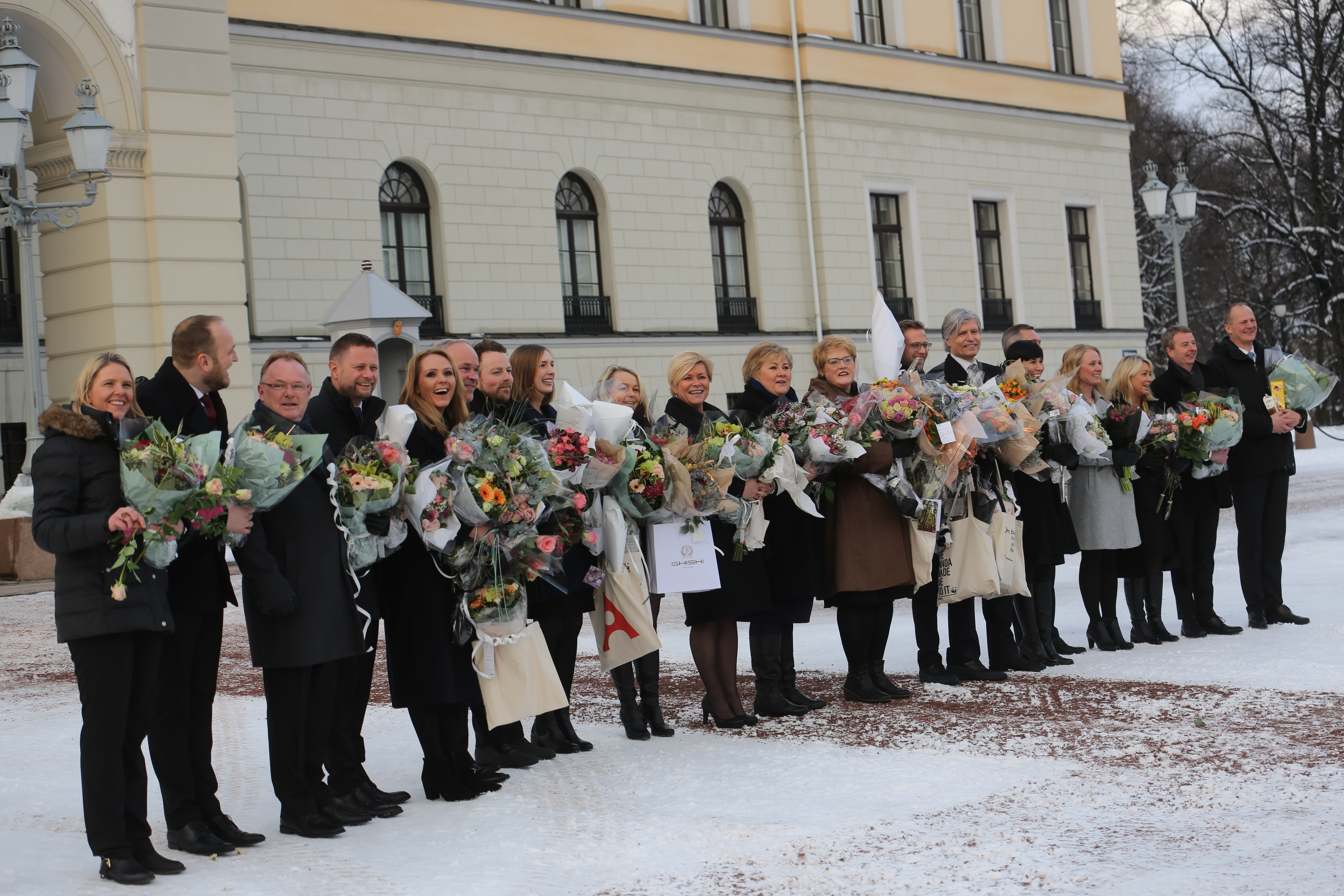
- Date formed: 16 October 2013
- Date dissolved: 14 October 2021

People and organisations
- King: Harald V of Norway
- Prime Minister: Erna Solberg
- No. of ministers: 20
- Ministers removed: 22
- Member parties: Conservative Party; Liberal Party (2018–2021); Christian Democratic Party (2019–2021); Progress Party (2013–2020)
- Status in legislature: Coalition (majority) (2019–2020); Coalition (minority) (2013–2019; 2020–2021)

History
- Elections: 2013; 2017
- Legislature terms: 2013–2017; 2017–2021
- Predecessor: Second Stoltenberg cabinet
- Successor: Støre cabinet

The Solberg Cabinet was the government of the Kingdom of Norway, headed by Conservative Party leader Erna Solberg as Prime Minister from 16 October 2013 to 14 October 2021. The government was appointed by King Harald V on 16 October 2013 following the parliamentary election on 9 September, consisting of the Conservative Party and the Progress Party as a minority government. On 16 December 2015, the cabinet was re-shuffled. The government secured renewed support following the 2017 parliamentary election. It was expanded on 14 January 2018, when an agreement was reached to include the Liberal Party, and further expanded on 22 January 2019 when the Christian Democratic Party joined the coalition. On 20 January 2020, the Progress Party announced that it would withdraw from the government, citing the decision to bring home the family of a sick child from Syria, which included the child's mother, a Norwegian citizen who had volunteered for the Islamic State.

On 12 October 2021, Solberg handed the government's resignation as a result of the majority against it following the 2021 election. The cabinet functioned as an interim government until the Støre Cabinet was sworn in.

== Parliamentary support from 2013 and majority government from 2019 ==
The Government is a centre-right coalition. At its formation in 2013, it consisted of the Conservative Party and the Progress Party, relying on parliamentary support from the Liberal Party and the Christian Democratic Party through a separate agreement giving them influence on policy. The Liberal Party entered the government in January 2018, and so did the Christian Democratic Party in January 2019. The Progress Party left the coalition, the first Government in which it had participated, in January 2020. From January 2018 to January 2020 the coalition held a majority in the Parliament. The government is the first in Norway since 1986 in which centre-right parties have participated in a majority coalition.

== Members ==
On 16 October 2013, Erna Solberg's cabinet ministers were formally appointed by King Harald V.

The Cabinet had 18 ministers; two fewer than the previous Stoltenberg cabinet. It had eleven ministers from the Conservatives and seven from Progress, reflecting the parties' numerical strength in Parliament.

The cabinet had nine men and nine women. Their average age on taking office was 43. Six ministers had studies in economics, four were jurists and four had studies in the humanities or social sciences.

Seven ministers hailed from Western Norway, including Listhaug who now represented Oslo. Seven ministers (including Listhaug) represented Eastern Norway, three ministers represented Trøndelag, one Northern Norway and one Sørlandet. Siv Jensen was the only minister who was born and grew up in Oslo.

On 16 December 2015, Solberg made a cabinet reshuffle. The reshuffle increased the number of cabinet ministers from 18 to 20.

Three cabinet ministers were replaced on 20 December 2016.

A minor reshuffle happened on 20 October 2017 following the 2017 election.

The Liberal Party joined the coalition on 17 January 2018.

On 22 January 2019, with the Christian Democratic Party entering the coalition, the government consisted of 22 ministers, the greatest number ever in a Norwegian government.

Portfolio	Minister	Took office	Left office	Party
Prime Minister	Erna Solberg	16 October 2013	14 October 2021	Conservative
Minister at the Office of the Prime Minister, responsible for EEA Affairs and EU Relations, also Chief of Staff at the Office of the Prime Minister	Vidar Helgesen	16 October 2013	16 December 2015 (Note: became Minister of Climate and the Environment)	Conservative
Minister of Finance	Siv Jensen	16 October 2013	24 January 2020	Progress
Minister of Finance	Jan Tore Sanner	24 January 2020	14 October 2021	Conservative
Minister of Local Government and Modernisation	Jan Tore Sanner	16 October 2013	17 January 2018 (Note: became Minister of Education and Integration)	Conservative
Minister of Local Government and Modernisation	Monica Mæland	17 January 2018	24 January 2020	Conservative
Minister of Local Government and Modernisation	Nikolai Astrup	24 January 2020	14 October 2021	Conservative
Minister of Defence	Ine Marie Eriksen Søreide	16 October 2013	20 October 2017 (Note: became Minister of Foreign Affairs)	Conservative
Minister of Defence	Frank Bakke-Jensen	20 October 2017	14 October 2021	Conservative
Minister of Foreign Affairs	Børge Brende	16 October 2013	20 October 2017	Conservative
Minister of Foreign Affairs	Ine Marie Eriksen Søreide	20 October 2017	14 October 2021	Conservative
Minister of Justice, Public Security and Immigration (Note: Minister of Migration and Integration was separate minister from 2015 to 2018)	Anders Anundsen	16 October 2013	20 December 2016	Progress
Minister of Justice, Public Security and Immigration	Per-Willy Amundsen	20 December 2016	17 January 2018	Progress
Minister of Justice, Public Security and Immigration	Sylvi Listhaug	17 January 2018	20 March 2018	Progress
Minister of Justice, Public Security and Immigration	Tor Mikkel Wara	4 April 2018	15 March 2019	Progress
Minister of Justice, Public Security and Immigration	Jøran Kallmyr	29 March 2019	24 January 2020	Progress
Minister of Justice, Public Security and Immigration	Monica Mæland	24 January 2020	14 October 2021	Conservative
Minister of Trade and Industry	Monica Mæland	16 October 2013	17 January 2018 (Note: became Minister of Local Government and Modernisation)	Conservative
Minister of Trade and Industry	Torbjørn Røe Isaksen	17 January 2018	24 January 2020	Conservative
Minister of Trade and Industry	Iselin Nybø	24 January 2020	14 October 2021	Liberal
Minister of Transport and Communications	Ketil Solvik-Olsen	16 October 2013	31 August 2018	Progress
Minister of Transport and Communications	Jon Georg Dale	31 August 2018	24 January 2020	Progress
Minister of Transport and Communications	Knut Arild Hareide	24 January 2020	14 October 2021	Christian Democratic
Minister of Agriculture	Sylvi Listhaug	16 October 2013	16 December 2015 (Note: became Minister of Migration and Integration)	Progress
Minister of Agriculture	Jon Georg Dale	16 December 2015	31 August 2018	Progress
Minister of Agriculture	Bård André Hoksrud	31 August 2018	22 January 2019	Progress
Minister of Agriculture	Olaug Bollestad	22 January 2019	14 October 2021	Christian Democratic
Minister of Fisheries and Seafood (Note: until 2015 also Minister for Nordic Cooperation Affairs)	Elisabeth Aspaker	16 October 2013	16 December 2015 (Note: became Minister of European Affairs and Nordic Cooperation)	Conservative
Minister of Fisheries and Seafood	Per Sandberg	16 December 2015	13 August 2018	Progress
Minister of Fisheries and Seafood	Harald T. Nesvik	13 August 2018	24 January 2020	Progress
Minister of Fisheries and Seafood	Geir-Inge Sivertsen	24 January 2020	2 March 2020	Conservative
Minister of Fisheries and Seafood	Odd Emil Ingebrigtsen	13 March 2020	14 October 2021	Conservative
Minister of Education and Research	Torbjørn Røe Isaksen	16 October 2013	17 January 2018 (Note: became Minister of Trade and Industry)	Conservative
Minister of Education and Research	Jan Tore Sanner	17 January 2018	24 January 2020	Conservative
Minister of Education and Research	Trine Skei Grande	24 January 2020	13 March 2020	Liberal
Minister of Education and Research	Guri Melby	13 March 2020	14 October 2021	Liberal
Minister of Higher Education and Research	Iselin Nybø	17 January 2018	24 January 2020	Liberal
Minister of Higher Education and Research	Henrik Asheim	24 January 2020	14 October 2021	Conservative
Minister of Children, Equality and Social Inclusion	Solveig Horne	16 October 2013	17 January 2018	Progress
Minister of Children, Equality and Social Inclusion	Linda Hofstad Helleland	17 January 2018	22 January 2019	Conservative
Minister of Children and Family Affairs	Kjell Ingolf Ropstad	22 January 2019	20 September 2021	Christian Democratic
Minister of Petroleum and Energy	Tord Lien	16 October 2013	20 December 2016	Progress
Minister of Petroleum and Energy	Terje Søviknes	20 December 2016	31 August 2018	Progress
Minister of Petroleum and Energy	Kjell-Børge Freiberg	31 August 2018	18 December 2019	Progress
Minister of Petroleum and Energy	Sylvi Listhaug	18 December 2019	24 January 2020	Progress
Minister of Petroleum and Energy	Tina Bru	24 January 2020	14 October 2021	Conservative
Minister of Health and Care Services	Bent Høie	16 October 2013	14 October 2021	Conservative
Minister of Elderly and Public Health	Åse Michaelsen	17 January 2018	3 May 2019	Progress
Minister of Elderly and Public Health	Sylvi Listhaug	3 May 2019	18 December 2019	Progress
Minister of Elderly and Public Health	Terje Søviknes	18 December 2019	24 January 2020	Progress
Minister of Labour and Social Affairs	Robert Eriksson	16 October 2013	16 December 2015	Progress
Minister of Labour and Social Affairs	Anniken Hauglie	16 December 2015	24 January 2020	Conservative
Minister of Labour and Social Affairs	Torbjørn Røe Isaksen	24 January 2020	14 October 2021	Conservative
Minister of Culture and Church Affairs	Thorhild Widvey	16 October 2013	16 December 2015	Conservative
Minister of Culture and Church Affairs	Linda Hofstad Helleland	16 December 2015	17 January 2018 (Note: became Minister of Children, Equality and Social Inclusion)	Conservative
Minister of Culture and Church Affairs	Trine Skei Grande	17 January 2018	24 January 2020	Liberal
Minister of Culture and Church Affairs	Abid Raja	24 January 2020	14 October 2021	Liberal
Minister of Climate and the Environment	Tine Sundtoft	16 October 2013	16 December 2015	Conservative
Minister of Climate and the Environment	Vidar Helgesen	16 December 2015	17 January 2018	Conservative
Minister of Climate and the Environment	Ola Elvestuen	17 January 2018	24 January 2020	Liberal
Minister of Climate and the Environment	Sveinung Rotevatn	24 January 2020	14 October 2021	Liberal
Minister of Migration and Integration	Sylvi Listhaug	16 December 2015	17 January 2018 (Note: became Minister of Justice, Public Security and Immigration)	Progress
Minister of European Affairs and Nordic Cooperation	Elisabeth Aspaker	16 December 2015	20 December 2016	Conservative
Minister of European Affairs and Nordic Cooperation	Frank Bakke-Jensen	20 December 2016	20 October 2017 (Note: became Minister of Defence)	Conservative
Minister of European Affairs and Nordic Cooperation	Marit Berger Røsland	20 October 2017	17 January 2018	Conservative
Minister of International Development	Nikolai Astrup	17 January 2018	22 January 2019	Conservative
Minister of International Development	Dag Inge Ulstein	22 January 2019	14 October 2021	Christian Democratic
Minister of Digital Affairs	Nikolai Astrup	22 January 2019	24 January 2020	Conservative
Minister of Public Security	Ingvil Smines Tybring-Gjedde	22 January 2019	24 January 2020	Progress
Minister of Regional and Digital Affairs	Linda Hofstad Helleland	24 January 2020	14 October 2021	Conservative

== State Secretaries ==
Ministry	State Secretary	Period	Party
Office of the Prime Minister	Julie Brodtkorb	21 April 2017	Conservative
Office of the Prime Minister	Lars Øy		Conservative
Office of the Prime Minister	Sigbjørn Aanes		Conservative
Office of the Prime Minister	Fredrik Färber	17 October 2014	Progress
Office of the Prime Minister	Marit Berger Røsland	17 October 2014 - 16 December 2015	Conservative
Office of the Prime Minister	Tore Vamraak	19 June 2015	Conservative
Office of the Prime Minister	Torkild Haukaas	19 June 2015 -	Conservative
Office of the Prime Minister	Ingvild Næss Stub	19 June 2015 -	Conservative
Office of the Prime Minister	Laila Bokhari	15 August 2016	Conservative
Ministry of Foreign Affairs	Bård Glad Pedersen	18 September 2015	Conservative
Ministry of Foreign Affairs	Hans Brattskar	7 August 2015	Conservative
Ministry of Foreign Affairs	Pål Arne Davidsen	22 November 2013	Progress
Ministry of Foreign Affairs	Morten Høglund	22 November 2013 - 16 December 2015	Progress
Ministry of Foreign Affairs	Ingvild Næss Stub	19 June 2015	Conservative
Ministry of Foreign Affairs	Elsbeth Tronstad	19 June 2015 -	Conservative
Ministry of Foreign Affairs	Tone Skogen	7 August 2015 -	Conservative
Ministry of Foreign Affairs	Laila Bokhari	15 August 2016 -	Conservative
Ministry of Foreign Affairs	Tore Hattrem	18 December 2015 - 23 September 2016	Conservative
Ministry of Foreign Affairs	Marit Berger Røsland	23 September 2016 - 2017	Conservative
Ministry of Finance	Paal Bjørnestad	16 December 2016	Conservative
Ministry of Finance	Jon Gunnar Pedersen	19 June 2015	Conservative
Ministry of Finance	Tore Vamraak	19 June 2015 -	Conservative
Ministry of Finance	Jørgen Næsje		Progress
Ministry of Finance	Ole Berget	17 October 2014	Progress
Ministry of Finance	Himanshu Gulati	17 October 2014 -	Progress
Ministry of Finance	Jon Georg Dale	17 October 2014 - 16 December 2015	Progress
Ministry of Finance	Cecilie Brein-Karlsen	20 December 2016 -	Progress
Ministry of Defence	Øystein Bø		Conservative
Ministry of Local Government and Modernization	Paul Chaffey		Conservative
Ministry of Local Government and Modernization	Kristin Holm Jensen		Conservative
Ministry of Local Government and Modernization	Anders Bals	28 November 2014	Conservative
Ministry of Local Government and Modernization	Anne Karin Olli	28 November 2014 -	Conservative
Ministry of Local Government and Modernization	Jardar Jensen	6 November 2015	Conservative
Ministry of Local Government and Modernization	Grete Ellingsen	6 November 2015 -	Conservative
Ministry of Local Government and Modernization	Per Willy Amundsen	20 December 2016	Progress
Ministry of Health and Care	Anne Grethe Erlandsen		Conservative
Ministry of Health and Care	Lisbeth Normann		Conservative
Ministry of Health and Care	Astrid Nøklebye Heiberg	15 April 2016	Progress
Ministry of Health and Care	Cecilie Brein-Karlsen	20 December 2016	Progress
Ministry of Agriculture and Food	Hanne Blåfjelldal		Progress
Ministry of Agriculture and Food	Ingvild Ofte Arntsen	30 October 2020-14 October 2021	Christian Democrat
Ministry of Transport and Communications	Bård Hoksrud	5 June 2015	Progress
Ministry of Transport and Communications	Reynir Johannesson	5 June 2015 -	Progress
Ministry of Transport and Communications	Jon Georg Dale	17 October 2014	Progress
Ministry of Transport and Communications	Tom Cato Karlsen	17 October 2014 -	Progress
Ministry of Transport and Communications	John-Ragnar Aarset	16 December 2015	Conservative
Ministry of Transport and Communications	Amund Drønen Ringdal	16 December 2015 – 11 May 2016	Conservative
Ministry of Transport and Communications	Ingvild Ofte Arntsen	24 January 2020-30 October 2020	Christian Democrat
Ministry of Trade and Fisheries	Dilek Ayhan		Conservative
Ministry of Trade and Fisheries	Eirik Lae Solberg	– 3 April 2014	Conservative
Ministry of Trade and Fisheries	Lars Jacob Hiim	3 April 2014 –	Conservative
Ministry of Trade and Fisheries	Amund Drønen Ringdal	– 16 December 2015	Conservative
Ministry of Labour and Social Affairs	Torkil Åmland	– 16 December 2015	Progress
Ministry of Labour and Social Affairs	Kristian Dahlberg Hauge	– 29 April 2016	Progress
Ministry of Labour and Social Affairs	Thor Kleppen Sættem	25 October 2013 – 20 December 2016	Conservative
Ministry of Labour and Social Affairs	Christl Kvam	2015 –	Conservative
Ministry of Culture	Knut Olav Åmås	6 June 2014	Conservative
Ministry of Culture	Bjørgulv Vinje Borgundvaag	6 June 2014 - 8 January 2016	Conservative
Ministry of Culture	Himanshu Gulati	15 January 2016 -	Progress
Ministry of the Environment	Lars Andreas Lunde		Conservative
Ministry of Petroleum and Energy	Kåre Fostervold	23 October 2015	Progress
Ministry of Petroleum and Energy	Kjell-Børge Freiberg	23 October 2015 -	Progress
Ministry of Justice	Himanshu Gulati	17 October 2014	Progress
Ministry of Justice	Jøran Kallmyr	17 October 2014 - 19 February 2016	Progress
Ministry of Justice	Vidar Brein-Karlsen		Progress
Ministry of Justice	Hans J. Røsjorde	25 October 2013 - 19 June 2015	Progress
Ministry of Justice	Gjermund Hagesæter	19 June 2015 - 20 December 2016	Progress
Ministry of Justice	Thor Kleppen Sættem	20 December 2016 –	Conservative
Ministry of Justice	Marit Berger Røsland	16 December 2015 - 23 September 2016	Conservative
Ministry of Justice	Torkil Åmland	29 September 2017 -	Progress
Ministry of Justice	Toril Charlotte Ulleberg Reynolds	1 October 2017 -	Progress
Ministry of Justice	Knut Morten Johansen	17 January 2018 -	Progress
Ministry of Justice	Sveinung Rotevatn	17 January 2018 -	Liberal
Ministry of Children and Social Inclusion	Maria Hoff Aanes	17 October 2014	Progress
Ministry of Children and Social Inclusion	Kai-Morten Terning	17 October 2014 -	Progress
Ministry of Children and Social Inclusion	Ida Krag	26 November 2015 - 6 January 2016 (acting)	Progress
Ministry of Children and Social Inclusion	Jøran Kallmyr	16 December 2015 - 19 February 2016	Progress
Ministry of Children and Social Inclusion	Marit Berger Røsland	16 December 2015 - 1 April 2016	Conservative
Ministry of Children and Social Inclusion	Vidar Brein-Karlsen	19 February 2016 - 1 April 2016	Progress
Ministry of Children and Family Affairs	Ingvild Ofte Arntsen	30 October 2020-14 October 2021	Christian Democrat
Ministry of Education	Bjørn Haugstad	16 October 2013-22 February 2018	Conservative
Ministry of Education	Birgitte Jordahl	25 October 2013 – 12 August 2016	Conservative
