= Birgitte Jordahl =

Norwegian politician (born 1965)

Birgitte Jordahl (born 28 April 1965) is a Norwegian politician for the Conservative Party.

Jordahl holds a degree in Education from the University of Oslo. From 2006 to 2010 she served as a political adviser for the Conservative Party parliamentary caucus. She was also a secretary and adviser for Oslo's city commissioner for health and social affairs, Anniken Hauglie and chief city commissioner Stian Berger Røsland. In October 2013 she was named in Solberg's Cabinet as a State Secretary in the Ministry of Education and Research.

She resides in Lommedalen.
