= Thor Kleppen Sættem =

Norwegian politician

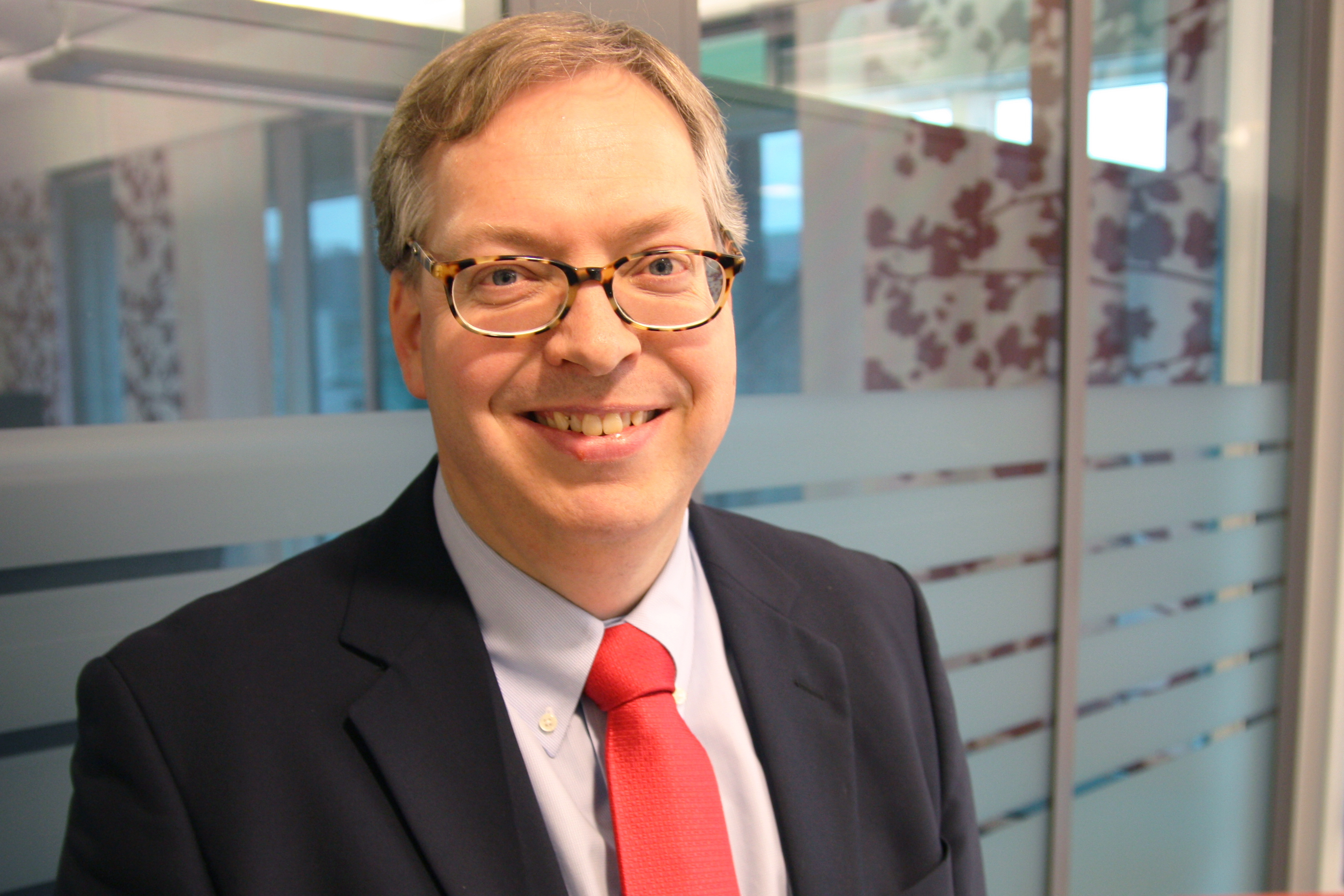
Thor Kleppen Sættem, 2013.

Thor Kleppen Sættem (born 16 November 1970) is a Norwegian lawyer and politician for the Conservative Party.

Sættem is a jurist by education, and within politics he was a secretary for the city commissioner of finance in Oslo, worked in the Conservative Party's parliamentary secretariat, and was a political adviser in the Confederation of Norwegian Enterprise.

He was also elected to Møre og Romsdal county council and was a deputy representative to the Parliament of Norway from Møre og Romsdal during the term 1993–1997, albeit without meeting in parliamentary session.

Sættem was a State Secretary during the entire lifespan of Solberg's Cabinet, from 2013 to 2021. He started under Robert Eriksson in the Ministry of Labour, then continued under Anniken Hauglie from December 2015. In December 2016 he switched to the Ministry of Justice, serving under five successive Progress Party Ministers of Justice until the Progress Party exited Solberg's Cabinet in January 2020. He then served under Monica Mæland until Solberg's Cabinet fell in October 2021.

After leaving the cabinet, Sættem passed the bar and was hired as a partner in the law firm Elden in October 2023.
