= Xtra (newspaper) =

Norwegian newspaper

Xtra was a Norwegian newspaper published by the Norwegian Young Conservatives.

The paper appeared about five times a year. The newspaper first appeared in 1922 and was originally called Unge Høire. It changed its name to Extra in 1980. In 2000, after Marit Berger took over as editor, it was relaunched in a magazine format under the name Xtra. Following the strong showing by the Conservative Party in the 2005 parliamentary election, which led to lower state aid, some annual issues started being published online. The publication was sued for unauthorized use of a cover photo in 2007 and had to pay a €5980 fine. Xtra was discontinued in 2010.

== Editors ==
- Marit Berger (2000–2002)
- Torbjørn Røe Isaksen (2002–2004)
- Marianne Groth (2004–2006)
- Ida Mjelde (2006–2007)
- Bjørn Olav Isaksen (2008–2010)
