= Sættem =

Sættem is a Norwegian surname. Notable people with the surname include:

- Birgitte Sættem (born 1978), Norwegian retired handball player and Olympic medalist and World Champion
- Thor Kleppen Sættem (born 1970), Norwegian lawyer and politician
