= Jøran Kallmyr =

Norwegian politician

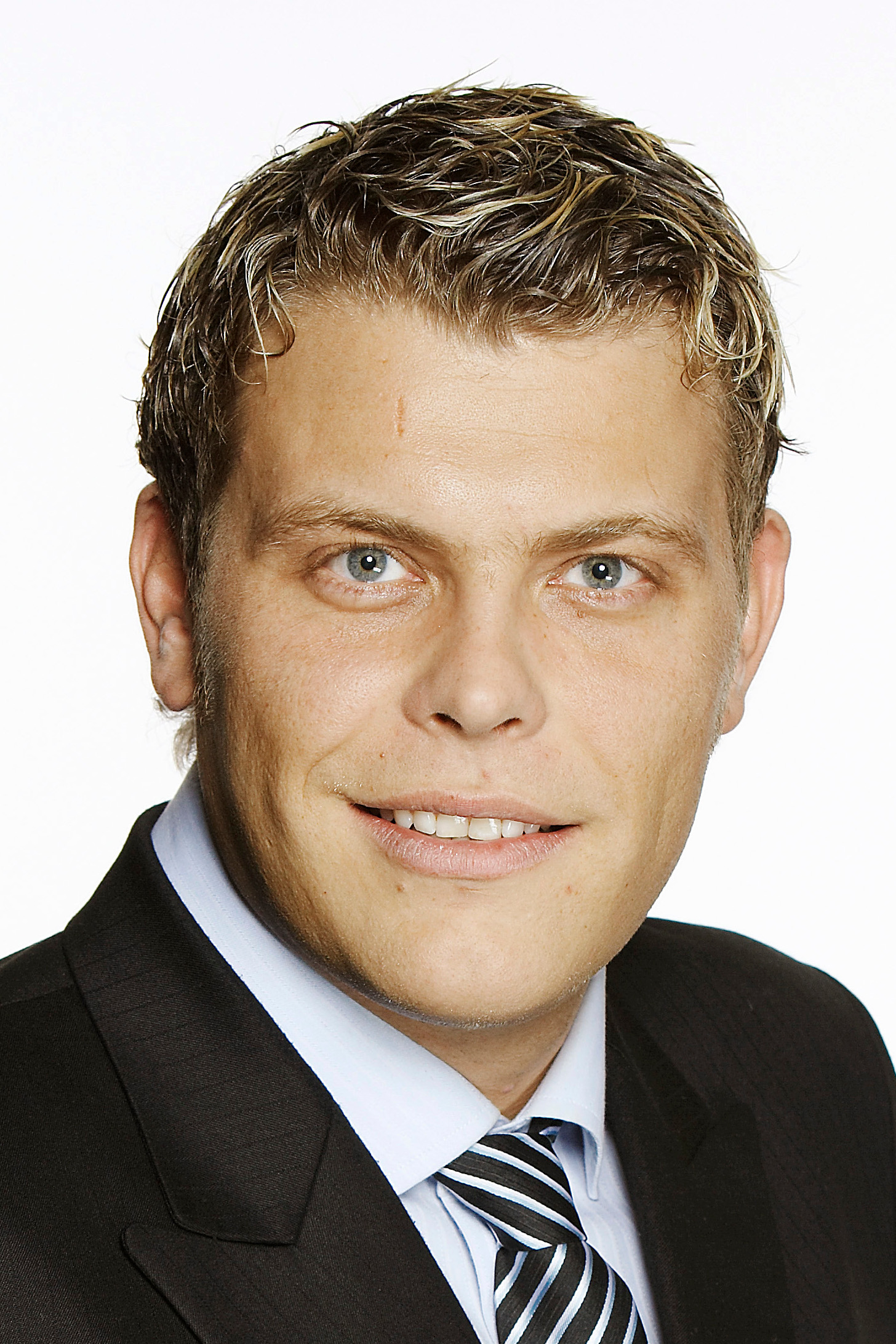

Minister of Justice, Public Security and Immigration
- In office 29 March 2019 – 24 January 2020
- Prime Minister: Erna Solberg
- Preceded by: Tor Mikkel Wara
- Succeeded by: Monica Mæland

State Secretary for the Ministry of Justice and Public Security
- In office 17 October 2014 – 19 February 2016
- Prime Minister: Erna Solberg
- Minister: Anders Anundsen

Oslo City Commissioner for Transport and the Environment
- In office 25 February 2009 – 26 September 2011
- Governing Mayor: Erling Lae; Stian Berger Røsland
- Preceded by: Peter N. Myhre
- Succeeded by: Ola Elvestuen

Personal details
- Born: Jøran André Smedal Kallmyr; 15 April 1978 (age 48) Fræna Municipality, Møre og Romsdal, Norway
- Party: Progress
- Spouse: Torunn Smedal Kallmyr
- Occupation: Jurist; Politician

Jøran André Smedal Kallmyr (born 15 April 1978) is a Norwegian politician and jurist for the Progress Party who served as Minister of Justice from 2019 to 2020.

== Early life ==
Kallmyr was born on 15 April 1978 in Fræna Municipality in Møre og Romsdal.

== Career ==
He served as State Secretary in the Ministry of Justice and Public Security from 2014 to 2016.

Kallmyr served as acting Oslo city commissioner for welfare and social services from 2008 to 2009. From 2009 to 2011, he served as Oslo city commissioner for transport and the environment. In the wake of the 2011 local elections, he was succeeded by Ola Elvestuen.

Kallmyr is a lawyer and partner for the Ræder AS law firm from 2012 to 2014, 2016 to 2019 and again since 2020. There he specialises in property rights, administrative law and regulatory issues.

=== Minister of Justice ===
Kallmyr was appointed Minister of Justice and Immigration in Solberg's Cabinet on 29 March 2019 following Tor Mikkel Wara's resignation.

==== Tenure ====
Two months into his tenure, controversy arose surrounding his family's au pair, who had been forced to leave the country after breaching the Immigration Act. Though questioned about whether he himself broke the rules, Kallmyr expressed he didn't think so, but would be apologetic if he had.

In July, he expressed concerns for private citizens and aid organisations potentially helping refugees who travelled via boat through the Mediterranean Sea. He added that this could help increase flow of refugees, more than what private citizens could have the capability to assist. The Socialist Left Party criticised his statement and called it "alarming".

In October, Kallmyr stated that the government would be looking into changing the frameworks for Norwegian men to bring foreign women home, many cases of which revealed that many suffered from abuse and exploitation. Kallmyr expressed that the government was concretely considering a "quarantine" waiting period.

He was succeeded by Monica Mæland as justice minister in January 2020 after his party had decided to withdraw from the cabinet over a dispute regarding a Muslim woman with a sick child being brought home from Syria. Kallmyr himself supported his party's decision to withdraw from the cabinet.

== Personal life ==
Kallmyr is married to Torunn Smedal Kallmyr, with whom he has children.

Political offices
Preceded by Peter N. Myhre	Oslo City Commissioner for Transport, the Environment and Enterprise; 2009–2011	Succeeded by Ola Elvestuen
Preceded by Tor Mikkel Wara	Minister of Justice; 2019–2020	Succeeded by Monica Mæland
