= Torkil Åmland =

Norwegian politician (born 1966)

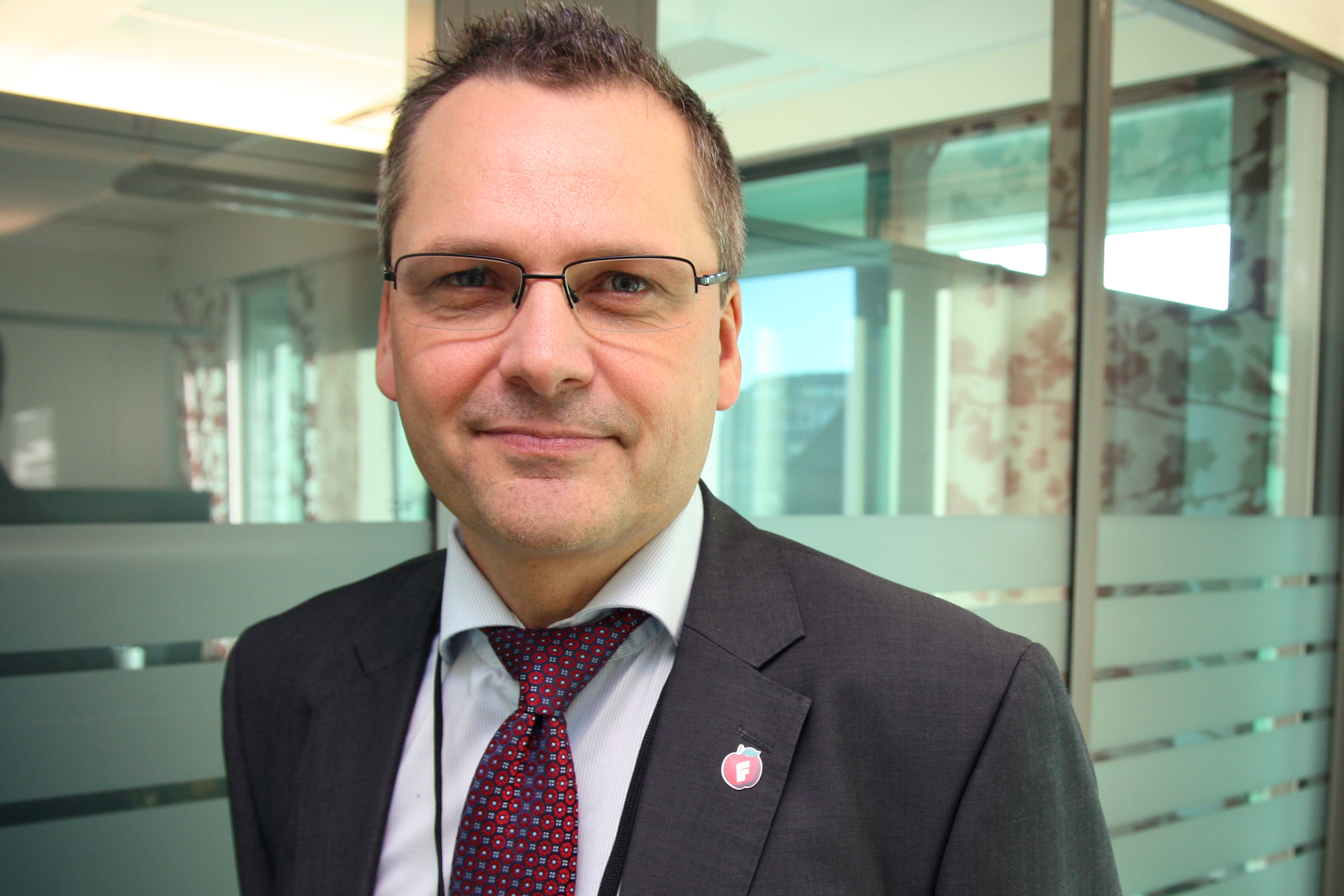
Torkil Åmland

Torkil Åmland (born 23 December 1966) is a Norwegian politician for the Progress Party. He was appointed State Secretary for Robert Eriksson in the Ministry of Labour when Solberg's cabinet was formed in October 2013.

== Education ==
Åmland did various studies in the humanities and social sciences at University of Bergen and University of Oslo in the 1990s. In 2001, he studied public policy at Regent University in Virginia. He obtained a Master's Degree in history at University of Bergen in 2005.

== Civil career ==
Åmland has mostly worked for private Christian schools in Bergen. He was principal of Bergen Christian Primary School 1996–2000 and principal of Kristianborg Upper Secondary School 2006–2008. Both of these schools were affiliated with Levende Ord Bibelsenter. He has been principal of Danielsen Upper Secondary School since 2009.

== Political career ==
Åmland became a member of the Progress Party in 1999. In his youth, he was a member of the Liberal Party. He was a member of the city council of Bergen 2003–2007. Since 2006, he has served as deputy leader of Bergen Progress Party and since 2013 as deputy leader of Hordaland Progress party. He served as a deputy representative to the Parliament of Norway from Hordaland during the terms 2009–2013, 2013–2017, and 2017–2021. He was appointed to Solberg's Cabinet as State Secretary in the Ministry of Labour from 2013 to December 2015, and later acting State Secretary in the Ministry of Justice and Public Security from January to June 2017.

== Personal life ==
Åmland is married with three children. He is a Christian and was a central figure in Levende Ord Bibelsenter in the 2000s, He left the congregation in 2008.
