= Lisbeth Normann =

Norwegian politician

Lisbeth Normann (born 1 February 1960) is a Norwegian trade unionist and politician for the Conservative Party.

She was hired as a nurse at Aker Hospital in 1985, transferring to Rikshospitalet in 1999. In 2001 she started working in the political department of the Norwegian Nurses Organisation. From 2006 to 2007 she was a director at Aker Hospital.

Normann was elected leader of the Norwegian Nurses Organisation in 2007. She concurrently served as deputy leader of the trade union center Confederation of Unions for Professionals (Unio).

When she left this position in 2011, she was hired in KPMG. When the Conservative Party managed to form Solberg's Cabinet in October 2013, Normann was appointed State Secretary for Bent Høie in the Ministry of Health and Care Services. She served until 2017.

She married Aker hospital director Erik Kreyberg Normann.

Civic offices
Preceded by Bente Slaatten	Leader of the Norwegian Nurses Organisation; 2007–2011	Succeeded by Eli Gunhild By
