= André Støylen =

Norwegian politician (born 1968)

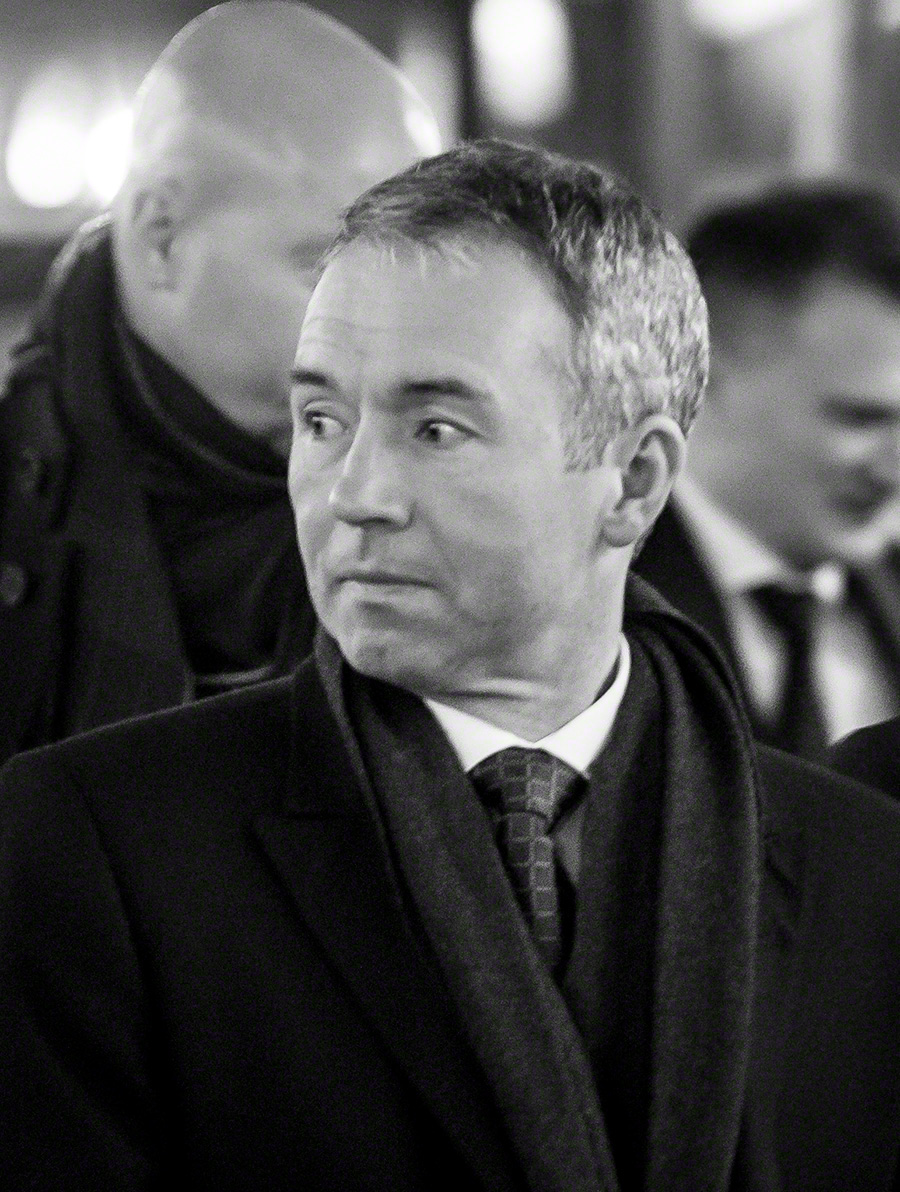

Personal details
- Born: April 9, 1968 (age 58) Ørsta, Norway
- Party: Conservative

André Støylen (born 9 April 1968) is a Norwegian politician for the Conservative Party.

Born in Ørsta Municipality, he served in the position of deputy representative to the Norwegian Parliament from Møre og Romsdal during the term 1989–1993. From 1994 to 1996 he was the leader of the Young Conservatives (Unge Høyre), the youth wing of the Conservative Party.

When the Conservative Party entered the cabinet in 2001, Støylen was appointed State Secretary in the Ministry of the Environment. In 2002 he became City Commissioner (byråd) of Finance in the city government of Oslo, leaving in 2007.

In 2008 he was appointed to the board of the National Gallery of Norway. In 2014 he was hired as the new chief executive of the foundation Sparebankstiftelsen DnB.

Party political offices
Preceded by Jan Tore Sanner	Leader of Norwegian Young Conservatives; 1994–1996	Succeeded by Bjørn Johnny Skaar
Political offices
Preceded by Audun Iversen	Oslo City Commissioner of Finance and Development; 2002–2007	Succeeded by Stian Berger Røsland
Non-profit organization positions
Preceded by Frode Helgerud	Chief executive of Sparebankstiftelsen DnB; 2014–present	Incumbent
