= Bjørn Johnny Skaar =

Norwegian politician

Bjørn Johnny Skaar (born 14 August 1971) is a Norwegian politician for the Conservative Party.

From 1996 to 1998 he was the leader of the Young Conservatives (Unge Høyre), the youth wing of the Conservative Party.

He served in the position of deputy representative to the Norwegian Parliament from Oslo during the term 1997–2001.

In 2001, during the second cabinet Bondevik, Skaar was appointed political advisor in the Ministry of the Environment. In 2004 he changed ministry to the Ministry of Trade and Industry. He held the post until the change in government in 2005.

Preceded by André Støylen	Leader of Norwegian Young Conservatives; 1996–1998	Succeeded by John-Ragnar Aarset
