= Torbjørn Røe Isaksen =

Norwegian politician (born 1978)

Torbjørn Røe Isaksen MP
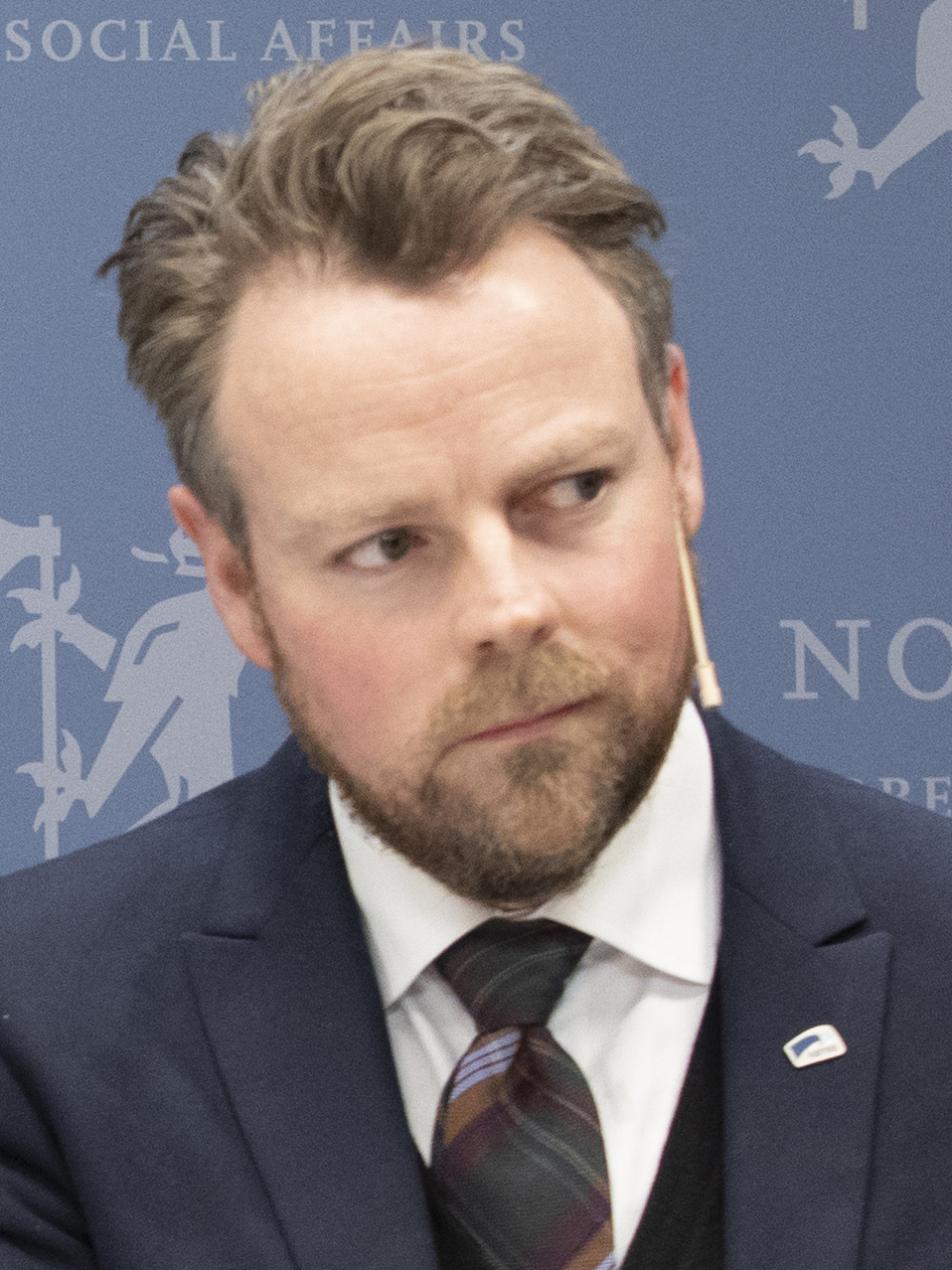
- Røe Isaksen in 2020

Minister of Labour and Social Inclusion
- In office 24 January 2020 – 14 October 2021
- Prime Minister: Erna Solberg
- Preceded by: Anniken Hauglie
- Succeeded by: Hadia Tajik

Minister of Trade and Industry
- In office 17 January 2018 – 24 January 2020
- Prime Minister: Erna Solberg
- Preceded by: Monica Mæland
- Succeeded by: Iselin Nybø

Minister of Education and Research
- In office 26 November 2017 – 17 January 2018
- Prime Minister: Erna Solberg
- Preceded by: Henrik Asheim (acting)
- Succeeded by: Jan Tore Sanner
- In office 16 October 2013 – 15 September 2017
- Prime Minister: Erna Solberg
- Preceded by: Kristin Halvorsen
- Succeeded by: Henrik Asheim (acting)

Minister of Fisheries
- Acting
- In office 2 March 2020 – 13 March 2020
- Prime Minister: Erna Solberg
- Preceded by: Geir-Inge Sivertsen
- Succeeded by: Odd Emil Ingebrigtsen

Member of the Norwegian Parliament
- In office 1 October 2009 – 30 September 2017
- Deputy: Solveig Sundbø Abrahamsen
- Constituency: Telemark

Leader of the Young Conservatives
- In office 20 June 2004 – 22 June 2008
- First Deputy: Torkild Haukaas; Sunniva Flakstad Ihle; Henrik Asheim
- Second Deputy: Harald Victor Hove; Henrik Asheim; Stefan Heggelund
- Preceded by: Ine Marie Eriksen
- Succeeded by: Henrik Asheim

Personal details
- Born: 28 July 1978 (age 48) Ålesund, Møre og Romsdal, Norway
- Party: Conservative
- Spouse: Henriette Ringnes (m. 2011)
- Children: 3
- Education: University of Oslo

Torbjørn Røe Isaksen (born 28 July 1978) is a Norwegian politician, MP for the Conservative Party who served as Minister of Labour and Social Inclusion from 2020 to 2021. He previously served as Minister of Trade and Industry from 2018 to 2020 and Minister of Education and Research from October 2013 to January 2018; except from September to November 2017 when he was on parental leave and his duties were undertaken by Henrik Asheim.

== Career ==
=== Early career ===
Isaksen edited the newspaper Xtra, published by the Young Conservatives (Unge Høyre), the youth wing of the Conservative Party from 2002 to 2004, and he was the leader of the Young Conservatives from 2004 to 2008. Prior to entering politics full-time, Isaksen worked as a freelance journalist and was the political editor in the gazette Minerva. Isaksen holds a master's degree in political science from the University of Oslo. His master's thesis was on Friedrich Hayek.

In 2007, he was named Norway's most talented young politician by VG.

In 2008, he published the book The Right Turn. For a New Conservatism, which was printed in three editions.

=== Parliament ===
Hailing from Porsgrunn, he served as a deputy representative to the Norwegian Parliament from Telemark during the 2005–2009 term. In the 2009 election he was the top candidate for the Telemark Conservatives and was elected to the parliament for the first time.

=== Minister ===
Isaksen served as minister throughout Erna Solberg's tenure as prime minister, although heading different ministries.

==== Minister of Education ====
Following the 2013 election, Isaksen was appointed minister of education in Solberg's cabinet. He retained the post following the 2017 election, but was on parental leave from 15 September to 26 November. He then held the post until the Liberal Party joined the government on 17 January 2018.

==== Minister of Trade and Industry ====
After the Liberal Party joined the government on 17 January 2018, Isaksen was appointed minister of trade and industry.

On 27 June, he announced that the Norwegian state would withdraw from its ownership of SAS, which included 9,88% of the stocks in the company. He stated: “SAS has had a positive development recently, and I have great faith that the company will work purposefully to further improve its competitive position. We believe this is a good time to sell out of the company”. He went on to say: “There is no reason to believe that changed ownership will affect workplaces, grids or other operational conditions in the company. The current structure is already the result of commercial assessments by the company, and not of state ownership”.

In late March 2019, Isaksen expressed support for the permanent solution of having only summer time, instead of both standard and summer time.

==== Minister of Labour and Social Inclusion ====
Isakaen was appointed minister of labour and social inclusion on 24 January 2020 after the Progress Party withdrew from government.

After Geir-Inge Sivertsen resigned as Minister of Fisheries in March 2020, Isaksen was acting minister for eleven days before Odd Emil Ingebrigtsen’s appointment.

On 27 May 2020, he stated to Minerva that he did not intend to stand for the 2021 election, and that he would be stepping down from politics altogether. His reasoning was to focus more on his family.

On 6 October, an article from NRK revealed that in a meeting, a few days after 10 July 2019, Isaksen gave an exception to a regulation when he was minister of trade and industry. The exception benefited two voyages by MS Roald Amundsen. The day after, the trade unions LO, Sjømannsforbundet and Norsk Sjøoffisersforbund requested an urgent meeting with Iselin Nybø, Isaksen’s successor. Hege-Merethe Bengtsson, a lawyer and a leader of the trade union Det norske maskinistforbund, claimed that Isaksen had no authority to make that exception to rules and regulations.

On 20 September 2021, Røe Isaksen condemned a knife attack at Norwegian Labour and Welfare Administration offices in Bergen. To the press, he stated: “It is a very tragic event. There is one person killed and one injured. Our thoughts now go to those who are relatives and those who are colleagues. The police will now be allowed to do their investigative work, but it is only natural that the case should be reviewed by us and NAV to see if there is anything that needs to be improved or done”. He also emphasised that it was unfortunate that threats were a daily occurrence among some working groups.

After Jonas Gahr Støre formed his cabinet in the aftermath of the 2021 election, Røe Isaksen was succeeded by Hadia Tajik.

=== After politics ===
On 15 December 2021, Røe Isaksen resigned from the Conservative Party to become the social editor at E24.

== Publications ==
- T.R. Isaksen and N. Astrup; Velferd etter velferdsstaten
- T.R. Isaksen; Høyre om (2008)
- T.R. Isaksen with Henrik Syse; Conservatism, an anthology With translated texts from amongst others Augustin, Edmund Burke, Joseph de Maistre, Konrad Adenauer and Roger Scruton (2011)

Party political offices
Preceded by Ine Marie Eriksen	Leader of the Norwegian Young Conservatives; 2004–2008	Succeeded by Henrik Asheim
Political offices
Preceded by Kristin Halvorsen	Minister of Education and Research; 2013–2017	Succeeded by Henrik Asheim (acting)
Preceded by Henrik Asheim (acting)	Minister of Education and Research; 2017–2018	Succeeded by Jan Tore Sanner
Preceded by Monica Mæland	Minister of Trade and Industry; 2018–2020	Succeeded by Iselin Nybø
Preceded by Anniken Hauglie	Minister of Labour and Social Inclusion; 2020–2021	Succeeded by Hadia Tajik
