= Fredrik Färber =

Norwegian politician

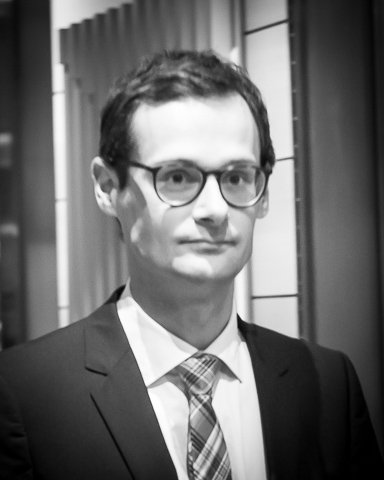
Fredrik Färber

Fredrik Färber (born 25 March 1979) is a Norwegian politician for the Progress Party.

He served as a deputy representative to the Parliament of Norway from Oppland during the term 1997–2001. He met during 32 days of parliamentary session. He worked for the Progress Party, among others as a strategic leader for their parliamentary group and as director of communications. He worked as director of communications in the Norwegian Shipowners' Association when Solberg's Cabinet assumed office in 2013. Färber was appointed as State Secretary in the Office of the Prime Minister, moving on to the Ministry of Finance from 2014 to 2016. He left to become secretary-general of the Progress Party.

Party political offices
Preceded by Finn Eigil Holm	Secretary-general of the Norwegian Progress Party; 2016–	Incumbent
