= Tore Vamraak =

Norwegian politician

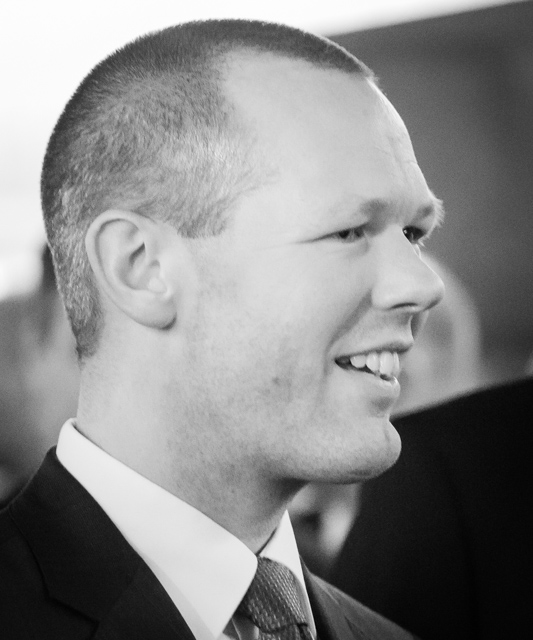
- Born: 3 December 1980 (age 45)
- Education: Norwegian School of Economics and the University of Oslo
- Occupations: Economist and politician
- Political party: Conservative Party

Tore Grobæk Vamraak (born 3 December 1980) is a Norwegian economist and politician for the Conservative Party. Having worked in the fields of economy and politics, he was appointed State Secretary from 2013 to 2018, and elected deputy representative to the Storting from the constituency of Akershus for the period 2021–2025.

== Career ==
Born on 3 December 1980, Vamraak enrolled at the Norwegian School of Economics at the age of 16. Graduating as an economist in 2000, he studied further subjects in natural sciences and political science at the University of Oslo. His job assignments include researcher at the Norwegian Defence Research Establishment from 2001 to 2006, trainee and asset manager at the Norges Bank Investment Management from 2006 to 2010, and advisor at the Conservative Party parliamentary caucus from 2010 to 2013.

Taking part in local politics, Vamraak was member of the executive committee of the municipal council of Skedsmo Municipality from 2011 to 2013. He was appointed State Secretary in Solberg's Cabinet; first at the Office of the Prime Minister from 2013 to 2015, and thereafter in the Ministry of Finance from 2015 to 2018. As State Secretary he was responsible for the Government Pension Fund and for financial markets. After ending his assignment as State Secretary, Vamraak was junior partner and associate partner in McKinsey & Company from 2018 to 2020. In 2020 he was appointed as chief economist for Econa, a trade union for business administrators.

He was elected deputy representative to the Storting from the constituency of Akershus for the period 2021–2025, for the Conservative Party. He replaced Jan Tore Sanner in the Storting from 1 to 14 October 2021 while Sanner was still government minister.

Becoming chief economist for Sparebanken Sør in 2023, he moved to Grimstad Municipality. He was also elected to the executive committee of Agder county council in the 2023 Norwegian local elections.
