= Geir-Inge Sivertsen =

Norwegian engineer and politician

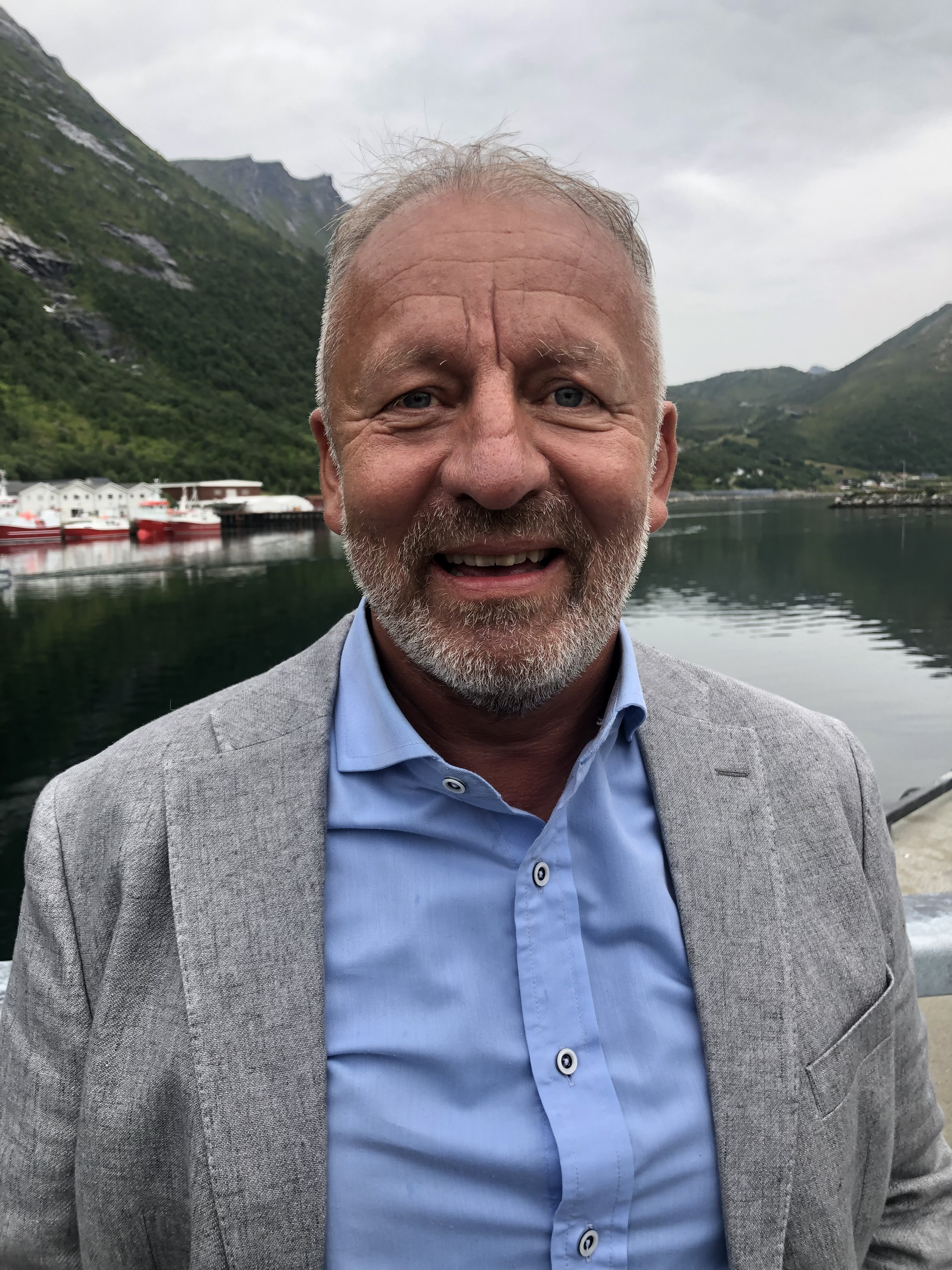

Mayor of Senja Municipality
- Incumbent
- Assumed office 26 October 2023
- Deputy: Marit Stubberud Hanssen
- Preceded by: Tom-Rune Eliseussen

Minister of Fisheries and Seafood
- In office 24 January 2020 – 2 March 2020
- Prime Minister: Erna Solberg
- Preceded by: Harald T. Nesvik
- Succeeded by: Odd Emil Ingebrigtsen

State Secretary for the Ministry of Trade and Fisheries
- In office 4 November 2019 – 24 January 2020
- Prime Minister: Erna Solberg
- Minister: Torbjørn Røe Isaksen

Mayor of Lenvik Municipality
- In office 2011–2019
- Preceded by: Martin Ness
- Succeeded by: None (municipality merged with Senja Municipality)

Personal details
- Born: 29 August 1965 (age 61)
- Party: Conservative
- Education: Norwegian Institute of Technology
- Occupation: Politician; Engineer

Geir-Inge Sivertsen (born 29 August 1965) is a Norwegian engineer and politician for the Conservative Party. He is currently the mayor of Senja since 2023. He served as minister of fisheries from January to March 2020, and previously served as mayor of Lenvik from 2011 to 2019.

== Personal life and education ==
Sivertsen hails from Finnsnes, and graduated as engineer from the Norwegian Institute of Technology.

== Political career ==
=== Local politics ===
Sivertsen served as mayor of Lenvik Municipality from 2011 until its dissolution in 2019.

He was the mayoral candidate for the Conservative Party in Senja Municipality in the 2023 local elections. After lengthy negotiations following the election, the Conservatives formed a majority with the Labour Party and Centre Party, with Sivertsen as mayor and Labour's Marit Stubberud Hanssen as deputy mayor. Both he and Stubberud Hanssen assumed office on 26 October.

=== Parliament ===
He was elected deputy member of the Storting for Troms in 2005, and served until 2009, before being re-elected in 2017 and served until 2021. During this time, he also served as State Secretary for the Ministry of Trade and Fisheries from 2019 to 2020.

=== Minister of Fisheries ===
From January to March 2020, Sivertsen served as the Minister of Fisheries in Erna Solberg's cabinet.

He resigned on 2 March after controversy surrounding his severance prior to becoming minister. Sivertsen had received double salary after taking over as Minister of Fisheries, by applying for and getting severance pay after his tenure as Mayor of Lenvik had ended. Labour minister Torbjørn Røe Isaksen succeeded him as acting minister until the appointment of Odd Emil Ingebrigtsen as his permanent successor on 13 March.
