= Ingvild Næss Stub =

Norwegian politician

Ingvild Næss Stub (born 1978) is a Norwegian politician for the Conservative Party.

== Bibliography ==
Hailing from Kråkstad, she is a daughter of former Ski mayor Georg Stub. She became active in JEF Norway at a young age, starting a local chapter in Ski and eventually became deputy leader nationwide. She also graduated with a cand.mag. degree in political science, history and Eastern Europe studies before taking a master's degree in EU history at the London School of Economics.

In late 2003 she was hired as director of information in JEF Norway's parent organization, the European Movement of Norway. From 2008 to 2012 she worked as a political adviser for the Conservative Party's parliamentary caucus. When the Conservative Party managed to form Solberg's Cabinet in October 2013, Næss Stub was appointed State Secretary for Børge Brende in the Ministry of Foreign Affairs. She quickly changed to being State Secretary for Minister of European Affairs Vidar Helgesen. In June 2015, Næss Stub was appointed to the Office of the Prime Minister, where she served as a State Secretary until Solberg's Cabinet fell in October 2021.

In January 2022 she started out as a director of international relations and business development in Standards Norway. She was also named in the government-appointed Commission on Extremism.
