= John-Ragnar Aarset =

Norwegian politician

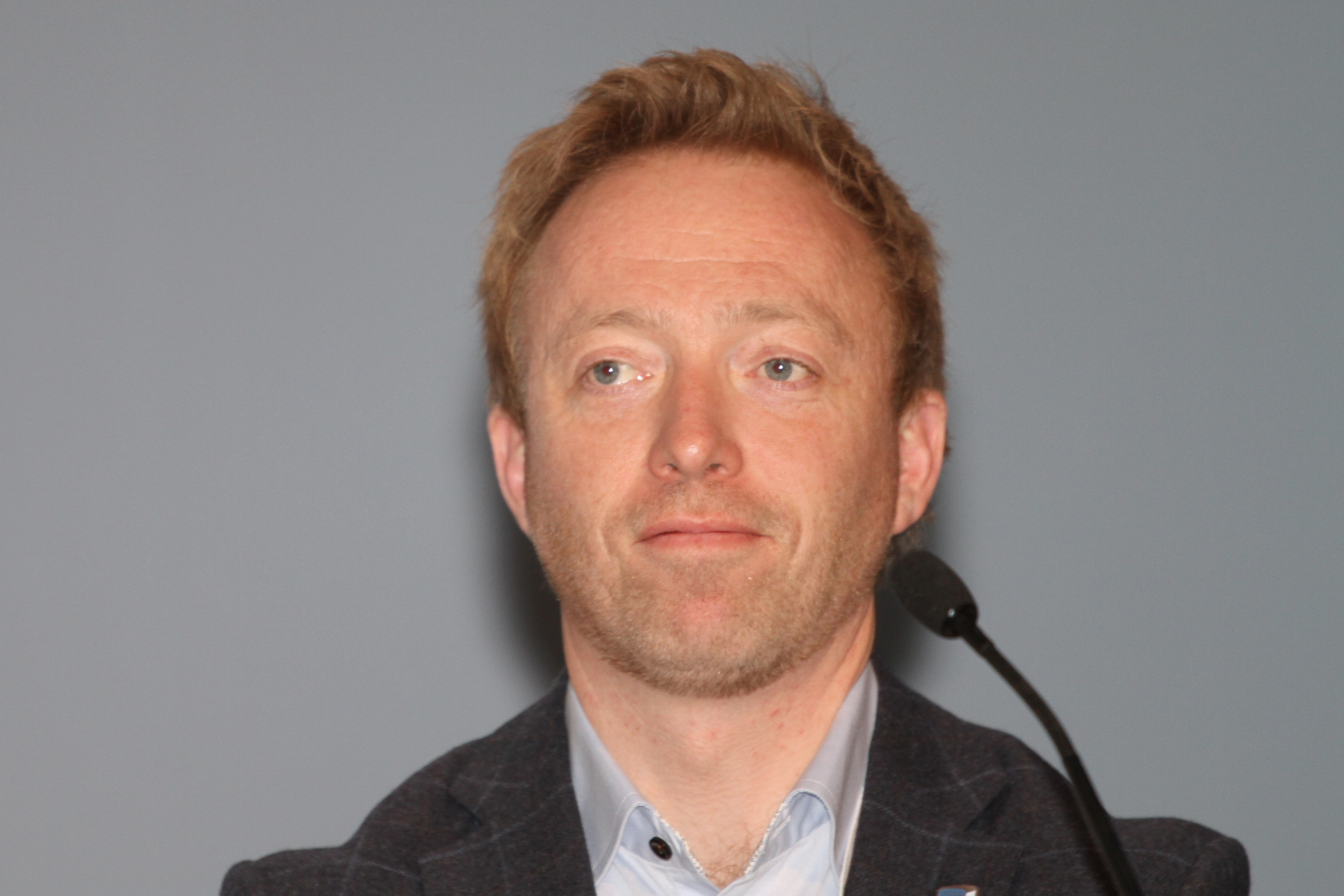

State Secretary (Ministry of Transport)
- In office 2013–2015, 2020–2021

deputy representative to the Parliament of Norway
- In office 2001–2005, 2005–2009

member of the Buskerud county council
- In office 1995–2002

member of the Hol municipal council
- In office 1991–1995

Personal details
- Born: 18 December 1973 (age 52) Geilo
- Party: Conservative Party

John-Ragnar Aarset (born 18 December 1973 in Geilo) is a Norwegian politician for the Conservative Party.

Aarset was a member of the Hol municipal council from 1991 to 1995. From 1995 to 2002, he was a member of the Buskerud county council. From 1998 to 2000 he was the leader of the Young Conservatives (Unge Høyre), the youth wing of the Conservative Party.

He served as a deputy representative to the Parliament of Norway from Buskerud during the term 2001–2005 and 2005–2009.

In 2004, during the second cabinet Bondevik, Aarset was appointed political advisor in the Ministry of Local Government and Regional Development. He held the post until the change in government in 2005.

In 2013, upon the inauguration of Solberg's Cabinet, he was named a State Secretary in the Ministry of Transport and Communications.

Since December 2015, he has served as the Secretary-General of Høyre.

Party political offices
Preceded by Bjørn Johnny Skaar	Leader of Norwegian Young Conservatives; 1998–2000	Succeeded by Ine Marie Eriksen
