= Ingvild Ofte Arntsen =

Norwegian politician

Ingvild Ofte Arntsen (born 1988) is a Norwegian politician for the Christian Democratic Party.

Hailing from Værøy Municipality, she became active in the Young Christian Democrats, the youth wing of the Christian Democratic Party. Advancing from member of the central board to deputy leader, in 2012 she was hired as secretary-general of the Young Christian Democrats. Mathea Fjukstad Hansen took over in 2014.

Arntsen grew up in the Pentecostal faith. When moving to Oslo for her higher education in 2007, she joined the Filadelfia church.

Arntsen worked as an adviser for the Christian Democratic Party's parliamentary caucus. When the Christian Democratic Party became a part of Solberg's Cabinet, Arntsen was eventually appointed as State Secretary for Olaug Bollestad in the Ministry of Agriculture and Food in April 2019. From May 2019 she doubled as a State Secretary for Kjell Ingolf Ropstad in the Ministry of Children and Families as well. In January 2020, she left both positions to continue as State Secretary for Knut Arild Hareide in the Ministry of Transport. In October 2020 she reverted to splitting her time between Bollestad and Ropstad. She remained a State Secretary until Solberg's Cabinet fell in October 2021. Arntsen returned to the parliamentary caucus to head its secretariat.

Party political offices
Preceded by Jørgen Honningsvåg	Secretary-general of the Young Christian Democrats; 2012–2014	Succeeded by Mathea Fjukstad Hansen
