= Jan Tore Sanner =

Norwegian politician

Jan Tore Sanner MP
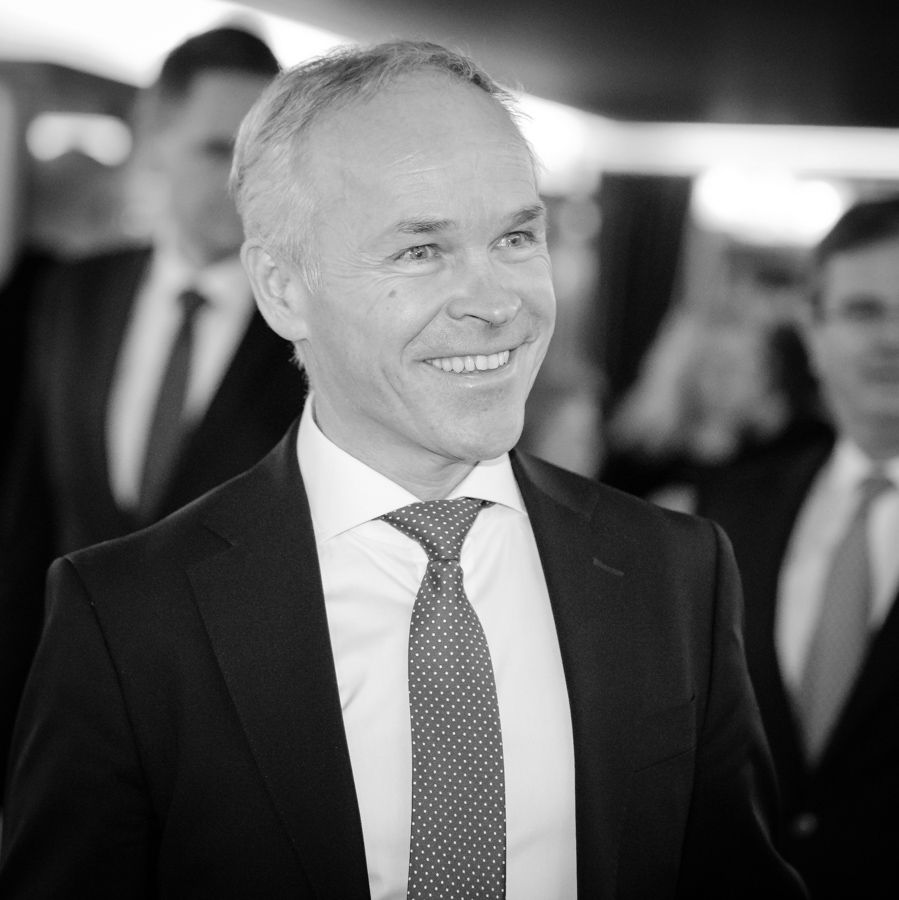
- Sanner in 2018

Minister of Finance
- In office 24 January 2020 – 14 October 2021
- Prime Minister: Erna Solberg
- Preceded by: Siv Jensen
- Succeeded by: Trygve Slagsvold Vedum

Minister of Education and Research
- In office 17 January 2018 – 24 January 2020
- Prime Minister: Erna Solberg
- Preceded by: Torbjørn Røe Isaksen
- Succeeded by: Trine Skei Grande

Minister of Nordic Cooperation
- In office 17 January 2018 – 14 October 2021
- Prime Minister: Erna Solberg
- Preceded by: Frank Bakke-Jensen
- Succeeded by: Anne Beathe Tvinnereim

Minister of Local Government
- In office 16 October 2013 – 17 January 2018
- Prime Minister: Erna Solberg
- Preceded by: Liv Signe Navarsete
- Succeeded by: Monica Mæland

Member of the Storting
- In office 1 October 1993 – 30 September 2025
- Deputy: Hårek Elvenes; Bente Stein Mathisen; Tore Vamraak
- Constituency: Akershus

Deputy Member of the Storting
- In office 1 October 1989 – 30 September 1993
- Member: Kaci Kullmann Five (1989–1990)
- Constituency: Akershus

Leader of the Young Conservatives
- In office 24 June 1990 – 26 June 1994
- Preceded by: Børge Brende
- Succeeded by: André Støylen

First Deputy Leader of the Conservative Party
- In office 27 April 2008 – 3 April 2022
- Leader: Erna Solberg
- Preceded by: Per-Kristian Foss
- Succeeded by: Henrik Asheim

Second Deputy Leader of the Conservative Party
- In office 9 May 2004 – 27 April 2008
- Leader: Erna Solberg
- Preceded by: Per-Kristian Foss
- Succeeded by: Erling Lae

Personal details
- Born: 6 May 1965 (age 61) Bærum, Akershus, Norway
- Party: Conservative
- Spouse: Solveig Barstad
- Children: 2
- Education: BI Norwegian Business School

Jan Tore Sanner (born 6 May 1965) is a Norwegian politician for the Conservative Party who has held several ministerial positions in Erna Solberg's government between 2013 and 2021. He was also the party's deputy leader from 2004 to 2022, having first been second deputy for the first four years and first deputy for the last fourteen. Sanner was also a member of parliament for Akershus from 1993 to 2025.

== Early life and education ==
Jan Tore Sanner was born in Bærum. He is the son of biochemist Tore Sanner and local politician Nina Sanner. He grew up in Nadderud and finished his secondary education at Nadderud Upper Secondary School in 1984. Sanner has education in marketing and market economy. He has never worked in the private sector.

== Political career ==
=== Local politics ===
Sanner was a deputy member of the Bærum municipal council from 1983 to 1989.

=== Parliament ===
He was elected to the Norwegian Parliament from Akershus in 1993. He had previously served as a deputy representative during the term 1989–1993. From 1989 to 1990 he moved up as a regular representative, filling in for Kaci Kullmann Five who was appointed to the cabinet Syse. Sanner and Syse went to the same school and were both leaders of the Young Conservatives.

Following the Solberg cabinet's defeat in the 2021 election, Sanner became the Conservative Party's spokesperson for education and a member of the Standing Committee on Education and Research. He succeeded Henrik Asheim as deputy parliamentary leader in October 2022.

In May 2024, he announced that he wouldn't seek re-election at the 2025 election.

=== Party politics ===
In the Norwegian Young Conservatives, the youth wing of the Conservative Party, he chaired the local chapter from 1985 to 1986, the regional chapter from 1987 to 1988, became deputy leader nationwide in 1988 and leader from 1990 to 1994. In the Conservative Party, he was a member of the central party board from 1988 to 1994 and served as the first deputy leader of the regional branch from 2001 to 2005. He was second deputy leader of the nationwide party from 2004 to 2008, and rose to first deputy leader in 2008.

On 16 January 2022, Sanner announced that he would step down as deputy leader at the next party convention in April. He told Aftenposten that it was time for someone new to take over and that the timing was sensible for it. He was succeeded by Henrik Asheim on 3 April.

=== Minister of Local Government ===
As a result of the parliamentary election in the fall of 2013, Sanner was appointed to the position of Minister of Local Government and Modernisation.

In April 2016, he didn't rule out that force could be used to merge counties who would not comply with the county merger. This reaction came after that Møre og Romsdal refused to be a part of the new regional reform.

In 2017, Sanner shot down the proposal "Memory Wound" by Jonas Dahlberg for a 22 July memorial. Instead, he announced that Statsbygg would be working on a new memorial to be placed at the Utøya quay. He expressed that "we don't want more attention around the place itself. There will be no art competition regarding the memorial, but we do put weight on the formulation of the place". The proposal was met with backlash from neighbours near the Utøya quay, who didn't rule out a lawsuit against it.

Towards the end of his term as local government minister, Sanner oversaw the merger of North and South Trøndelag, which came into effect on 1 January 2018.

=== Minister of Education ===
After the Liberals joined the Solberg cabinet in January 2018, Sanner was appointed minister of education and research.

In June 2018, he announced cuts to several school subjects, and that some elements would be cut. Notably, this included parts of history within the Norwegian and English subjects, with further elements in music, art and handcraft and religion. Despite criticism for the proposals, Sanner emphasised that both principles and teachers had long complained that there were too many subjects and that important subjects were not given enough depth. He further announced minor changes to exams and evaluations for subjects, so that they would be more closely linked to new ones.

In September 2019, Sanner responded to a Si;D post made in Aftenposten by a 16-year-old asking when political absence would be allowed in lower secondary school. Sanner's response was that "it is not something me or the government has planned to introduce". He did however emphasise that he understands that many youths would participate in political causes, but that students should be at school as much as possible. He further added that these interests or activities should be done outside of school hours.

In November 2019, Sanner made a last minute proposal to the new curriculums, in which schools now achieving more in depth lessons in regards to homosexuality and gender pronounces. Sanner expressed that "of course it should be included. Students should have the right knowledge about the different sexual orientations. We are going to lay the groundwork to fight against prejudice and discrimination, and promote transparency".

In January 2020, a few days before the end of his tenure as minister of education, Sanner responded to criticism from a member of the Socialist Left Youth League, of the government proposal of introducing exams to gymnastics, music, art and handcraft. Sanner stated that he hadn't introduced exams, but rather that students should excel exams within practical and esthetical subjects, and not just theoretical.

=== Minister of Finance ===
Following the Progress Party's withdrawal from government on 24 January 2020, Sanner was appointed minister of finance, succeeding Siv Jensen.

After controversy arouse about Nicolai Tangen being appointed chief of the Petroleum Fund, Sanner had originally expressed concerns about Tangen's appointment. The Ministry of Finance issued a press statement where they mentioned that Sanner doesn't have the authority to intervene in Tangen's appointment, further adding that the Governor of the Central Bank Øystein Olsen had not breached the central bank law. The day after, Sanner released a written statement in the Storting, in response to Labour Party deputy leader Hadia Tajik: "In the aftermath of this appointment process, I think it is natural to look at whether there are learning points. Furthermore, I will take the initiative to look at whether the formal framework for the Ministry of Finance's role in Norges Bank's appointment of the general manager of the management of the GPFG is appropriate". The case reached a close on 24 August, after Tangen announced he would sell himself out of AKO Capital and transfer his shares to AKO Foundation. Sanner expressed in a statement, that he was "glad that Nicolai Tangen and the Central Bank's board have reached a quick solution, and in my evaluation, follows the guidelines of the Storting".

In October, Sanner expressed he had no regrets in the spending that was used to help businesses and the usage of economic support packages. He argued that the high spending usage was "necessary and effective" and stressed that "during a crisis, it's important that people don't panic".

After the SSB put forward numbers indicating a mainland BNP drop by 2,5 percent in February 2021, that had occurred in 2020, Sanner stated that the fall was the largest that had occurred in peace time after World War II. He further expressed the seriousness in the fall and stressed the situation the Norwegian economy was in.

In June, he announced that the crises support used during the COVID-19 pandemic, would be abolished by autumn. He expressed that "we have finished the stress test", further adding that "it's also important to get the petroleum money usage down".

At the end of August, Sanner, alongside minister of petroleum and energy Tina Bru, announced at a press conference a proposal to reorganise the petroleum tax. The proposal received mixed reception from the opposition, with the Socialist Left and Red Party praising the proposal, while the Progress Party, Centre Party, and Green Party criticised it, with the Greens notably calling it "a desperate attempt" right before the election. The Centre Party called it a stunt.

A few days before the 2021 election, Verdens Gang revealed that Sanner asked the civil service to withhold documents about the Petroleum Fund's future due to the election campaign. Sanner denied that the documents had been withheld, and stated that they were going to be sent in by the designated deadline time for them to be handed in, which he also said they were. The opposition parties criticized Sanner for withholding the documents, with Labour deputy leader Hadia Tajik notably citing that "The government's decisions must withstand the light of day in all phases of an election campaign, and if they do not, one may ask how good the decision was in the first place".

Ahead of the state budget of 2022 being presented to the Storting in October, Sanner warned that there would be less money usage. He notably stated that the goal for the petroleum budget was to be under 3%. He also said that the expenses would go up due to there being less active ageing workers compared with the number of workers retiring.

=== County Governor ===
On 21 June 2024, Sanner was nominated to become the next county governor of Østfold, Buskerud, Oslo and Akershus, succeeding Valgerd Svarstad Haugland.

Party political offices
Preceded by Per-Kristian Foss	First Deputy Leader of the Conservative Party; 2008–2022	Succeeded by Henrik Asheim
Preceded by Per-Kristian Foss	Second Deputy Leader of the Conservative Party; 2004–2008	Succeeded by Erling Lae
Preceded by Børge Brende	Leader of the Young Conservatives; 1990–1994	Succeeded by André Støylen
Political offices
Preceded by Liv Signe Navarsete	Minister of Local Government; 2013–2018	Succeeded by Monica Mæland
Preceded by Torbjørn Røe Isaksen	Minister of Education; 2018–2020	Succeeded by Trine Skei Grande
Preceded by Siv Jensen	Minister of Finance; 2020–2021	Succeeded by Trygve Slagsvold Vedum
