= Marit Berger Røsland =

Norwegian politician

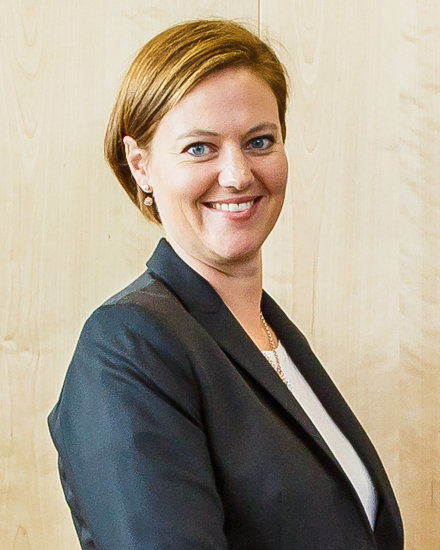

Minister of European Affairs
- In office 20 October 2017 – 17 January 2018
- Prime Minister: Erna Solberg
- Preceded by: Frank Bakke-Jensen
- Succeeded by: Position abolished

Personal details
- Born: 21 September 1978 (age 47) Lørenskog, Norway
- Party: Conservative
- Spouse: Stian Berger Røsland
- Children: 2
- Occupation: Lawyer and politician

Marit Berger Røsland (born 21 September 1978) is a Norwegian politician for the Conservative Party. She served as Norway's Minister of European Affairs from 2017 to 2018, as a member of Solberg's Cabinet.

== Personal life ==
Røsland was born in Lørenskog, and graduated as jurist from the University of Oslo. She is married to lawyer and for the Conservative Party politician Stian Berger Røsland.

== Political career ==
Røsland was elected member of the county council of Akershus for the period 1997–2000, and was a member of the municipal council of Oslo 2003–2007. She was elected as suppleant to the Storting from Akershus 2001–2005, representing the Conservative Party. She was political advisor in the Ministry of Foreign Affaires from 2003 to 2005. From 2006 to 2014 she worked as lawyer in Oslo. She served as State Secretary at the Office of the Prime Minister 2014–2015, State Secretary for the Ministry of Justice and Public Security 2015–2016, and State Secretary for the Ministry of Foreign Affaires 2016–2017. She was appointed Minister of European Affairs from 20 October 2017 to 17 January 2018.
