= Laila Bokhari =

Norwegian politician (1974–2025)

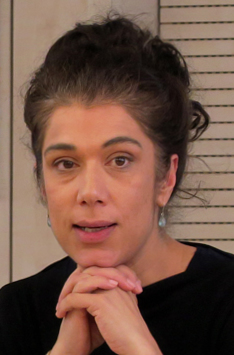
- Bokhari in 2017

State Secretary, Office of the Prime Minister
- In office 16 October 2013 – 15 August 2016
- Prime Minister: Erna Solberg

State Secretary, Ministry of Foreign Affairs
- In office 15 August 2016 – 20 October 2017
- Prime Minister: Erna Solberg

Personal details
- Born: 19 August 1974 London, England
- Died: 12 December 2025 (aged 51) Oslo, Norway
- Party: Conservative Party (Norway)
- Relatives: Amar Bokhari (brother)
- Education: Bachelor of Arts in International Affairs (University of Kent); Master of Arts in International Politics (University of Amsterdam); Master of Public Administration (Harvard University)
- Alma mater: University of Kent; University of Amsterdam; Norwegian Defence University College; Harvard Kennedy School
- Occupation: Political scientist, politician
- Known for: Member of the 22 July Commission; Security coordinator at the Office of the Prime Minister

Laila Bokhari (19 August 1974 – 12 December 2025) was a Norwegian political scientist and politician affiliated with the Conservative Party. She conducted research particularly on terrorism and politically motivated violence in South and Central Asia, the Middle East, and Europe.

Bokhari served as State Secretary at the Office of the Prime Minister from 2013 to 2016, where she was responsible for security coordination, including security and emergency preparedness. From 2016 to 2017, she was State Secretary at the Ministry of Foreign Affairs.

== Early life and education ==
Laila Bokhari was born in London on 19 August 1974. She had a Pakistani father and a Norwegian mother and grew up in Lillehammer, London, and Islamabad.

She studied political science, international law, and international politics at the University of Kent in the United Kingdom and at the University of Amsterdam in the Netherlands. She completed the Chief of Defence Course at the Norwegian Defence University College and was a Kistefos Fellow at the Harvard Kennedy School of Government.

Bokhari had extensive personal knowledge of Pakistan and Afghanistan. She also studied Arabic and Middle East politics in Jerusalem and in the West Bank.

== Career ==
Bokhari worked at the Norwegian Defence Research Establishment, the Norwegian Institute of International Affairs, the United Nations Security Council Al-Qaida and Taliban Monitoring Team (the “1267 Committee”), the Temporary International Presence in Hebron, PRIO, NATO, and the OSCE. She was also employed at the Norwegian Embassy in Islamabad, Pakistan.

She was a commentator for Forsvarets forum, Ny Tid, and Gudbrandsdølen Dagningen, and served, among other roles, on the Government’s Security Policy Committee from 2006 to 2009, in several NATO working groups, and as an adviser to the Pakistan Institute of Peace Studies in 2011.

In 2010, Bokhari published the book Holy Rage: My Journey Through Pakistan (original Norwegian: Hellig Vrede. Min reise gjennom Pakistan).

She attracted media attention in connection with the awarding of the Nobel Peace Prize to Barack Obama when she stated that extreme animal rights activists, climate activists, gang environments, and far-right groups posed a greater threat than Islamist terrorism.

In 2011, she was appointed a member of the 22 July Commission, which investigated the 2011 terrorist attacks in Norway.

On 16 October 2013, Bokhari was appointed State Secretary to Prime Minister Erna Solberg.

From 2018 to 2019, she was affiliated with the Harvard Kennedy School of Government as a Kistefos Fellow and completed a Mid-Career Master in Public Administration, focusing on security leadership in crisis situations.

Bokhari served as chair of the board of the Lillehammer Museum Foundation and as a board member of Oslo Metropolitan University, the Norwegian Institute of International Affairs, the Rafto Foundation, the Human Rights House Foundation, and the Nansen Peace Center. She also served as a board director at the Global Center on Cooperative Security and Hedayah.

== Death ==
Bokhari died on 12 December 2025, at the age of 51, after several years of suffering from cancer.

== Works ==
- Hellig Vrede. Min reise gjennom Pakistan (Gyldendal, 2010)
- Arven etter far, co-authored with Åshild Eidem (Gyldendal, 2015)
