= Odd Emil Ingebrigtsen =

Norwegian politician (born 1964)

Mayor of Bodø Municipality
- Incumbent
- Assumed office 5 October 2023
- Deputy: Ida Gudding Johnsen
- Preceded by: Ida Pinnerød

Minister of Fisheries and Seafood
- In office 13 March 2020 – 14 October 2021
- Prime Minister: Erna Solberg
- Preceded by: Geir-Inge Sivertsen
- Succeeded by: Bjørnar Skjæran

State Secretary for the Ministry of Petroleum and Energy
- In office 24 January 2020 – 13 March 2020
- Prime Minister: Erna Solberg
- Minister: Tina Bru

Leader of the Bodø Conservatives
- Acting; July 1991 – October 1991
- Preceded by: Asbjørn Sørensen
- Succeeded by: Dagfinn Røsberg
- In office November 1985 – February 1987
- Preceded by: Thor Otto Steen
- Succeeded by: Solveig Bernhoft

Deputy Member of the Storting
- In office 1 October 1989 – 30 September 1993
- Constituency: Nordland

Personal details
- Born: 8 October 1964 (age 62) Bodø Municipality, Nordland, Norway
- Party: Conservative
- Spouse: Grete Bang Ingebrigtsen
- Children: 3
- Occupation: Politician; Businessman; Publisher

Odd Emil Ingebrigtsen (born 8 October 1964) is a Norwegian politician for the Conservative Party. He is currently the mayor of Bodø Municipality since 2023 and previously served as the Minister of Fisheries from 2020 to 2021.

== Personal life ==
He is married to Grete Bang Ingebrigtsen, with whom he has three sons. One of them is also a member of the Labour Party.

== Political career ==
=== Youth wing ===
From 1986 to 1988 he was the secretary general of the Young Conservatives (Unge Høyre), the youth wing of the Conservative Party.

=== Local politics ===
On the local level he was a member of Bodø city council from 1988 to 2007, and chaired the local party chapter from 1985 to 1987. He also chaired the local chapter in an acting capacity between July and October 1991.

On 29 June 2022, he was announced as the Bodø Conservatives' mayoral candidate in the upcoming 2023 local elections. Following negotiations after the election, the Conservatives formed a majority with the Progress Party and Liberal Party, with Ingebrigtsen as mayor and the Liberals' Ida Gudding Johnsen as deputy mayor.

=== Mayor of Bodø ===
He and Gudding Johnsen were confirmed as mayor and deputy mayor by the municipal council on 5 October and took their respective roles the same day.

During the opening ceremony of Bodø as a Cultural Capital for 2024, Ingebrigtsen called on support and unity for Sami people after criticism was levelled against Sami artist and activist Ella Marie Hætta Isaksen for showing a banner with "This is Sami land" during the ceremony.

His coalition came under fire for going in to close several kindergartens and schools due to budget constraints. The action led to mass protests in the affected neighbourhoods and opposition parties, mostly the Labour and Red parties, called the move unconstitutional. The case was however dismissed by the county governor, who cited that the move violated the Norwegian constitution's 104th section's second paragraph about children's rights to humane consideration. The municipality reversed their decision and asked school children for inputs. This was further criticised for not utilising simple language for young children to understand. In mid November, the majority parties in the city council decided to maintain two of the schools from closure.

=== Parliament ===
He served as a deputy representative to the Storting from Nordland from 1989 to 1993.

=== Minister of Fisheries ===
On 13 March 2020, he was appointed minister of fisheries following the resignation of Geir-Inge Sivertsen.

In December, he encouraged Norwegians who no longer had a job to take part in the winter fishing season, saying: "It will be fatal to stop production and operations in the middle of such a peak season. We hope that some of the need for labor can be solved by unemployed Norwegians getting jobs in Lofoten and Vesterålen now in the peak season".

In February 2021, Ingebrigtsen denied that young people would face difficult challenges in becoming fishers. He compared the challenges to the same ones faced when they're looking for a place to live, and asserted that it wasn't a given right to become a fisher. He also praised the young people for their engagement on the issue. His response came following criticism given by twenty year old young fisher who stated that one had to have a lot of money in to become a fisher.

In July, he asserted that Norway would respond harshly if the European Union would go against the salmon quotas established in the area around Svalbard. He also stated that it would be irrelevant for the EU or any other country to determine the said quotas.

Shortly before his departure, Ingebrigtsen sent a letter out to shipowners urging them to take action against sexual harassment on board fishing vessels. He also encouraged his successor to follow up on the issue. He also expressed that it appeared that the fisheries branch would be facing its own MeToo, saying: "It is important that we now have the floodlight on, so that the troll appears in the light and eventually cracks. It may seem that the fishing industry here may get its own "meeto"".

On 14 October, he was succeeded by Bjørnar Skjæran after the Solberg government was defeated at the previous month's election.
