= Iselin Nybø =

Norwegian politician

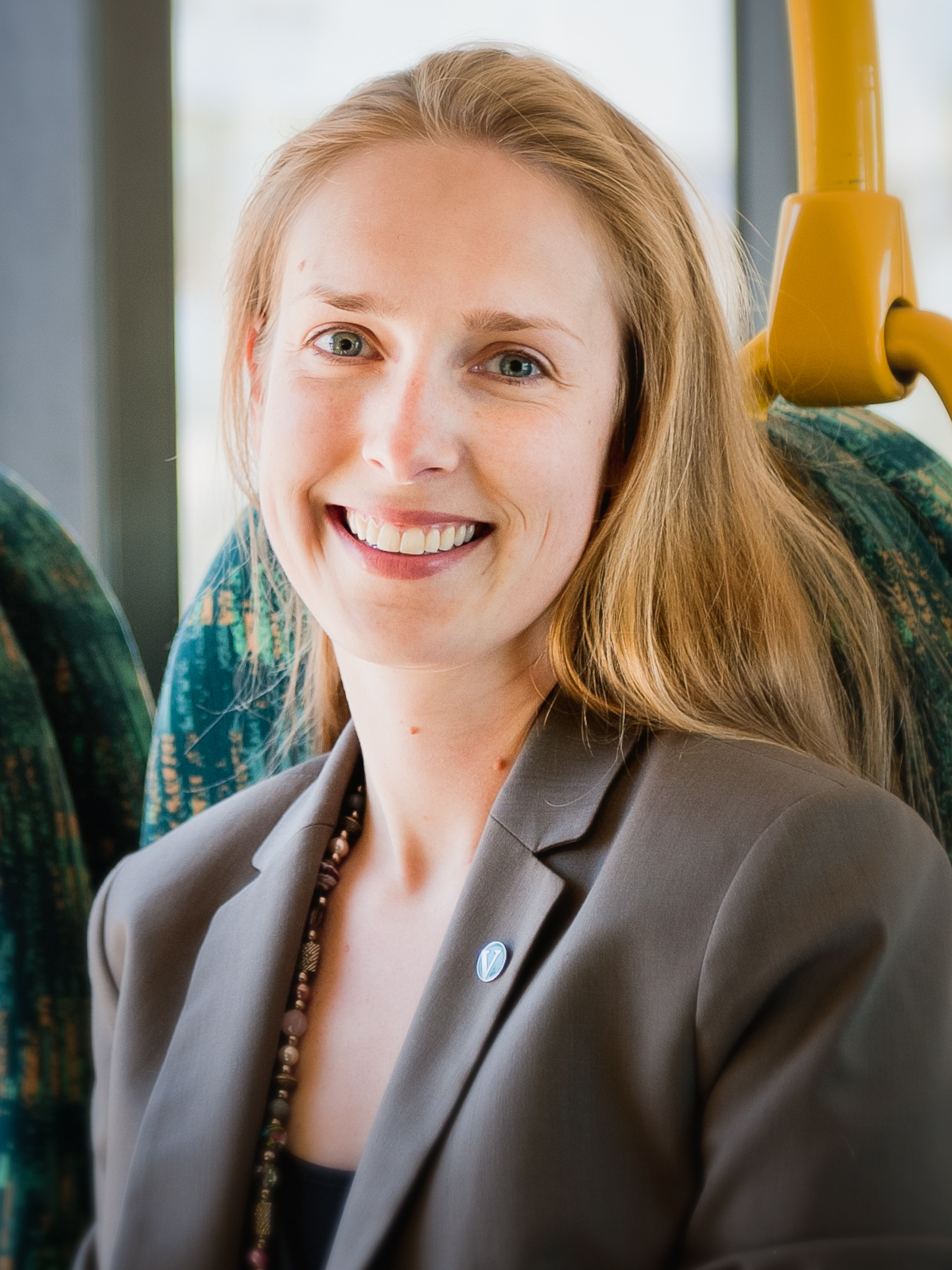
- Nybø in 2013

Minister of Trade and Industry
- In office 24 January 2020 – 14 October 2021
- Prime Minister: Erna Solberg
- Preceded by: Torbjørn Røe Isaksen
- Succeeded by: Jan Christian Vestre

Minister of Research and Higher Education
- In office 17 January 2018 – 24 January 2020
- Prime Minister: Erna Solberg
- Preceded by: Tora Aasland (2012)
- Succeeded by: Henrik Asheim

Member of the Norwegian Parliament
- In office 1 October 2013 – 30 September 2017
- Constituency: Rogaland

Personal details
- Born: 14 May 1981 (age 45) Randaberg Municipality, Rogaland, Norway
- Party: Liberal

Iselin Nybø (born 14 May 1981) is a Norwegian politician for the Liberal Party, who served as the Minister of Trade and Industry from 2020 to 2021. She also served as Minister of Higher Education from 2018 to 2020. She was elected to the Parliament of Norway from Rogaland in 2013, where she served as the first deputy chair of the Standing Committee on Education, Research, and Church Affairs. Her seat is a levelling seat.

== Education ==
Nybø has a Cand.jur. degree from the University of Bergen in 2006. She has later taken some courses in economics and organization studies. She worked as a jurist in the Norwegian Tax Administration from 2006 to 2009, then as a lawyer in private firms from 2009 to 2013.

== Career ==
=== Local politics ===
She was a member of the municipal council of Randaberg Municipality from 2003 to 2007 and has been a member of the municipal council of Stavanger Municipality from 2009.

From 2010 to 2012, she headed the Rogaland branch of the Liberal Party.

=== Minister of Higher Education ===
She was appointed minister of higher education in January 2018 following the Liberal Party’s negotiations to enter the Solberg cabinet. She held the position until 2020, when she was succeeded by Henrik Asheim.

=== Minister of Trade and Industry ===
Following the Progress Party’s withdrawal from government in January 2020, Nybø was appointed minister of trade and industry, succeeding Torbjørn Røe Isaksen.

Following Trine Skei Grande’s resignation as minister of education and Liberal Party leader, Nybø was designated the temporary highest ranking Liberal Party member of the Solberg cabinet. She was also designated to take over as acting prime minister in case Erna Solberg would be incapacitated, during the COVID-19 pandemic.

As minister of trade and industry, she led the government effort during the COVID-19 pandemic in Norway to secure trade and help small and big businesses in the country.

In August 2020, Nybø started her participation in negotiations with representatives of the United Kingdom for a free trade agreement.

In early September 2020, she encouraged Hurtigruten to change their practises immediately following one of their ships, the MS Fridtjof Nansen, being used as a temporary residency for the movie production of Mission: Impossible – Dead Reckoning Part One.

In November, she notably refused extra funding for the stimulus package for Norwegian Air Shuttle, stating “it’s not a defendable use of common resources”. Norwegian CEO Jacob Schram called it “a disgrace, a disappointment and a punch in the stomach”.

On 8 July 2021, Nybø signed the UK-Norwegian free trade agreement, which was described as being the most comprehensive trade deal Norway has had with any individual country.
