= Harald T. Nesvik =

Norwegian politician (born 1966)

Harald Tom Nesvik MP
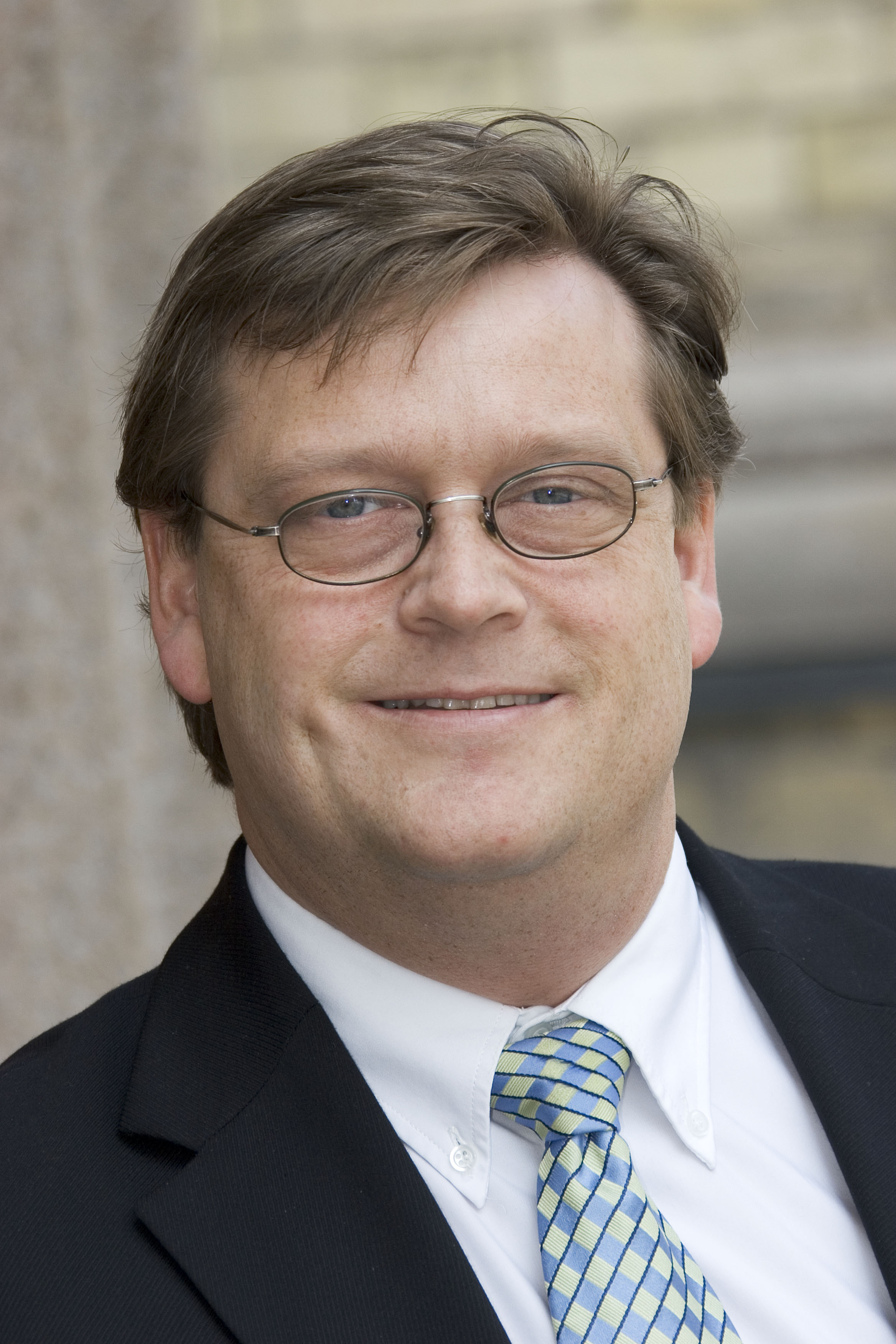
- Nesvik in 2009

Minister of Fisheries and Seafood (Note: Renamed Fisheries and Seafood on 30 August 2019.)
- In office 13 August 2018 – 24 January 2020
- Prime Minister: Erna Solberg
- Preceded by: Per Sandberg
- Succeeded by: Geir-Inge Sivertsen

Parliamentary Leader for the Progress Party
- In office 17 October 2013 – 2 October 2017
- Leader: Siv Jensen
- Preceded by: Siv Jensen
- Succeeded by: Hans Andreas Limi

Member of the Norwegian Parliament
- In office 1 October 1997 – 30 September 2017
- Constituency: Møre og Romsdal

Personal details
- Born: 4 May 1966 (age 60) Ålesund, Møre og Romsdal, Norway
- Party: Progress

Harald Tom Nesvik (born 4 May 1966) is a Norwegian politician and member of the Storting for Møre og Romsdal from 1997 to 2017. He is a member of the right-wing Progress Party (FrP). He served as Minister of Fisheries from 2018 to 2020.

In 2002, Nesvik claimed that he had nominated Tony Blair and George W. Bush for the 2002 Nobel Peace Prize.

== Early life and education ==
Born in Ålesund, Norway in 1966 to salesman Odd Nesvik (1941-) and homemaker Ragnhild Pedersen (1943-). He attended Ålesund senior high school from 1982 to 1985. He studied Export marketing at Møre and Romsdal College of Fishery Technology from 1991 to 1993. He also enrolled in the Military Defence College. Besides studying he worked in as a salesman for a local electronics store, as well as a bouncer for a local security company. He was a former football player with Ålesunds oldest club, SK Rollon, and remains a die-hard supporter of that club along with local powerhouse Aalesunds FK.

== Political career ==
An early member of the Progress Party, Nesvik became politically active after finishing high school in 1986. A member of Ålesund municipal council since 1987, Nesvik quickly became chairman of the Progress Party's Youth in Ålesund. He became chairman of Ålesund FrP by 1999. Before the parliamentary election in 1997, Nesvik was selected to run for the 10th seat in Møre og Romsdal county, which he gained. He has since been reelected to the Storting three times, serving four consecutive terms.

As the party joined the Conservative/Progress coalition government following the 2013 parliamentary election, Siv Jensen was appointed Minister of Finance. Nesvik was then elected the party's parliamentary leader.

=== Nobel Prize nomination ===
In 2002 Nesvik achieved brief international media attention when he publicly claimed that he had nominated British Prime Minister Tony Blair and US President George W. Bush for the Nobel Peace Prize.

In his statement to the Associated Press, Nesvik justified the claimed nomination, which was controversial to some, as follows: "The background for my nomination is their decisive action against terrorism, something I believe in the future will be the greatest threat to peace... Unfortunately, sometimes... you have to use force to secure peace."

The 2002 Nobel Prize was in the end awarded to former US President Jimmy Carter.

Non-winning Nobel nominations are kept secret for 50 years by the Nobel committee, so Nesvik's claim is not officially verifiable until 2052.

=== Storting committees ===
- 1997–2005: Member of the Standing Committee on Health and Social Affairs
- 2005–2009: Chairman of the Standing Committee on Health and Care Services
- 2009–2013: Vice-chairman of the Standing Committee on Business and Industry

== Bibliography ==
- 1997: Nesvik, Harald Tom, Giskeødegård, Otto : Produksjonslære for fiskeindustrien, Landbruksforlaget.
