= Anniken Hauglie =

Norwegian politician (born 1972)

Anniken Hauglie MP
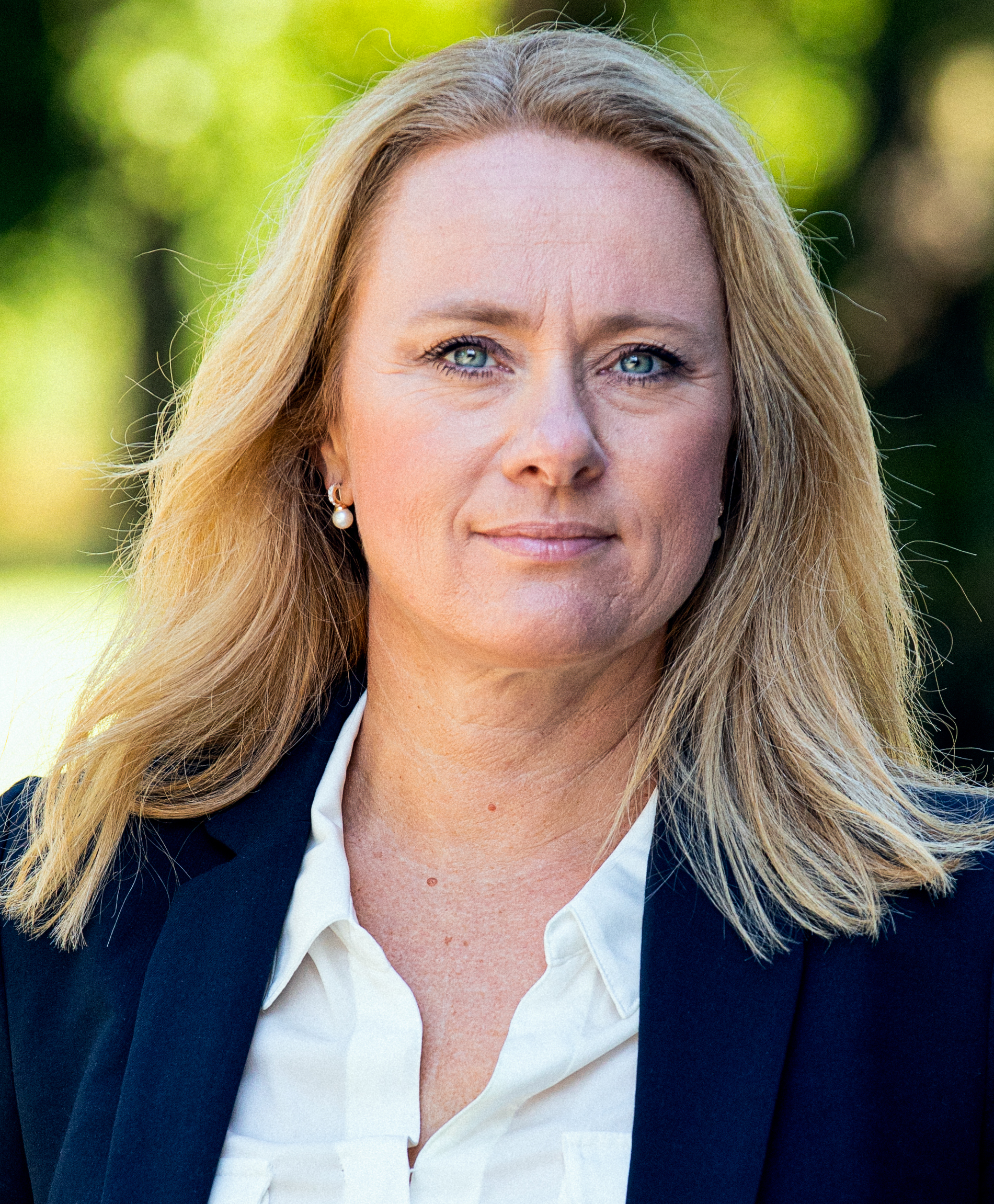
- Hauglie in 2020

Minister of Labour and Social Inclusion
- In office 16 December 2015 – 24 January 2020
- Prime Minister: Erna Solberg
- Preceded by: Robert Eriksson
- Succeeded by: Torbjørn Røe Isaksen

Oslo City Commissioner for Knowledge and Education
- In office 15 October 2013 – 21 October 2015
- Governing Mayor: Stian Berger Røsland
- Preceded by: Torger Ødegaard
- Succeeded by: Tone Tellevik Dahl

Oslo City Commissioner for Welfare and Social Services
- In office 25 January 2010 – 15 October 2013
- Governing Mayor: Stian Berger Røsland
- Preceded by: Sylvi Listhaug
- Succeeded by: Øystein Eriksen Søreide

Personal details
- Born: 10 September 1972 (age 53) Oslo, Norway
- Party: Conservative
- Spouse: Lars Jacob Hiim
- Children: 2
- Website: hoyre.no/personprofiler/a/h/anniken-hauglie

Anniken Hauglie (born 10 September 1972) is a Norwegian politician for the Conservative Party who served as Minister of Labour and Social Inclusion from December 2015 to January 2020.

== Education ==
Hauglie graduated from the University of Oslo in 2000, majoring in sociology, with a minor in political science, philosophy and ethics. She has also qualified in project management from BI Norwegian Business School in 2006.

== Career ==
=== Early career ===
Hauglie has previously worked at the Norwegian Consumer Council and as political advisor to the Ministry of Social Affairs, a social policy adviser in the second Bondevik Government (2001-2005) and has worked as a social policy adviser in the Conservative Party's parliamentary group until 2010.

She is known for her opposition of Norway's law banning the purchase of sex.

=== Oslo City Commissioner ===
From January 2010 to October 2013, she was Oslo's Commissioner for Social Services and head of child welfare, substance abuse and social services in the Department of the elderly and social services. From 2011, she expanded her responsibilities and became Commissioner for Health and Social Services. In October 2013, she became Commissioner for Knowledge and Education, an office she left when the Conservative block lost the 2015 local elections.

=== Minister of Labour and Social Inclusion ===
Hauglie was appointed minister of labour and social inclusion on 16 December 2015 following a cabinet reshuffle.

In April 2018, Hauglie presented a Storting report about security in the petroleum branch. She stated that the branch still had a few challenges when it came to work environment. She called for better follow-up and cooperation on HSE in the petroleum industry itself, and from the supervisory authorities. She did however express that in general, security has not worsened.

In 2019, Hauglie came under scrutiny after the NAV scandal was revealed, where at least 78 innocent people had been imprisoned due to a misunderstanding of the EEA guidelines regarding the use of social security. By January 2020, she along with former ministers of Labour, Prime Minister Erna Solberg and the Justice Minister, were brought forward to a hearing to explain themselves and what had transpired. She stepped down as minister on 24 January 2020 after the Progress Party withdrew from government, and was succeeded by Torbjørn Røe Isaksen.

=== Post politics ===
In March 2020, she became the CEO of Norwegian Oil and Gas, succeeding Karl Eirik Schjøtt-Pedersen. She could however not assume the positron before 24 July due to a six month quarantine imposed on her by the Quarantine Board, who has the responsibility to ensure smooth transitions for politicians from political offices to regular job positions. In June 2021, it was announced that she would become the deputy director of the Confederation of Norwegian Enterprise. She assumed the position on 15 November.

Political offices
Preceded by Sylvi Listhaug	Oslo City Commissioner of Elderly and Social Services; 2010–2013	Succeeded by Øystein Eriksen Søreide
Preceded by Torger Ødegaard	Oslo City Commissioner of Knowledge and Education; 2013–2015	Succeeded by Tone Tellevik Dahl
Preceded by Robert Eriksson	Minister of Labour and Social Inclusion; 2015–2020	Succeeded by Torbjørn Røe Isaksen
