= Stian Berger Røsland =

Norwegian politician

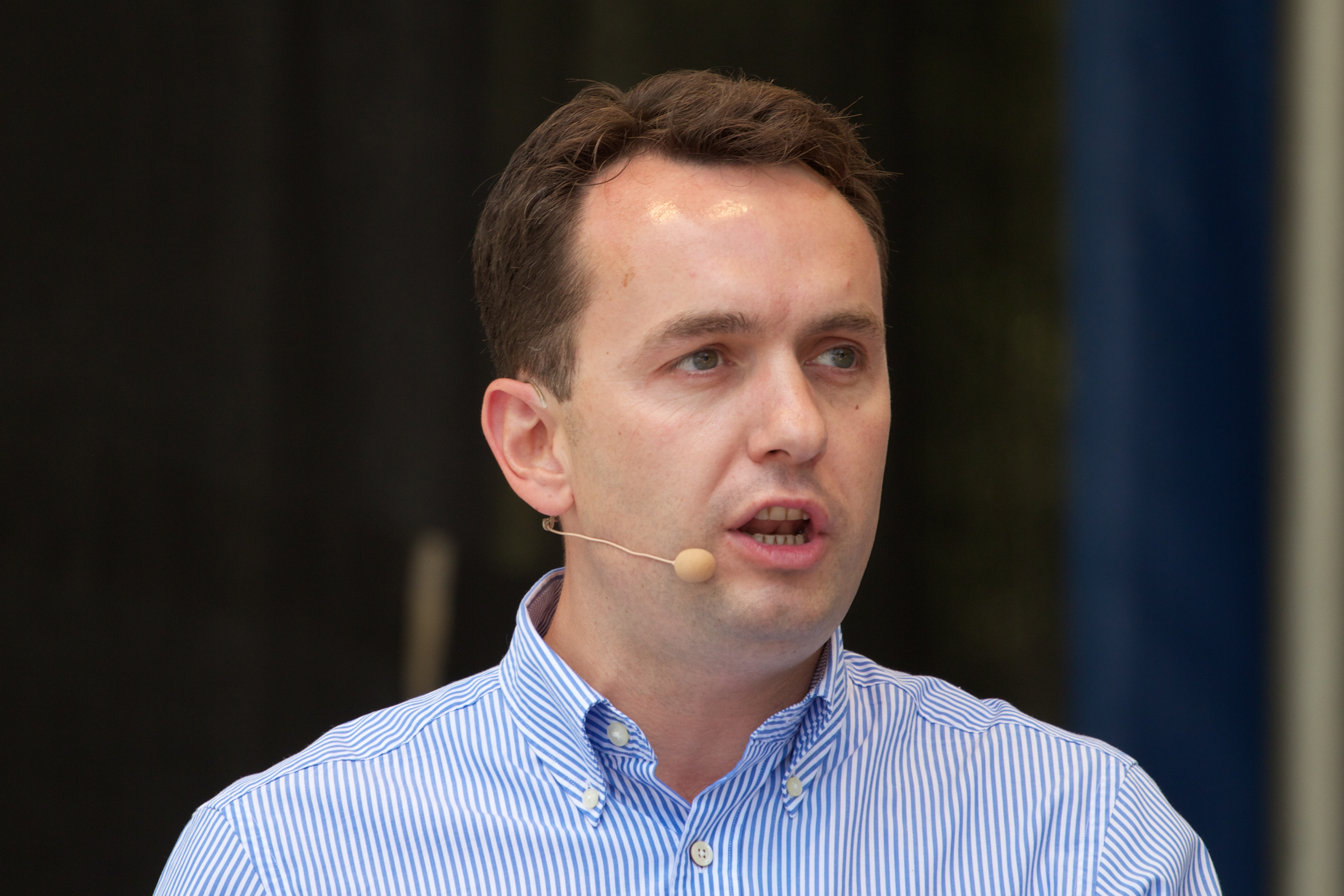

Governing Mayor of Oslo
- In office 29 September 2009 – 21 October 2015
- Mayor: Fabian Stang
- Preceded by: Erling Lae
- Succeeded by: Raymond Johansen

Oslo City Commissioner of Finance
- In office 17 December 2007 – 23 September 2009
- Governing Mayor: Erling Lae
- Preceded by: André Støylen
- Succeeded by: Kristin Vinje

Personal details
- Born: 3 November 1976 (age 48); Oslo, Norway
- Political party: Conservative
- Spouse: Marit Berger Røsland
- Children: 2

Stian Berger Røsland (born 3 November 1976 in Oslo) is a Norwegian politician for the Conservative Party. He succeeded Erling Lae as Governing Mayor of Oslo in 2009. He served until 2015, when he was replaced by Labour politician Raymond Johansen after the Conservatives and allies narrowly lost the majority in Oslo city council in the 2015 local elections. He also served as commissioner of finance under Erling Lae from 2007 to 2009.

== Personal life and education ==
Røsland is master of law from the University of Oslo. He is a lawyer and partner in the law firm Selmer DA. After resigning as governing mayor, he returned to the private sector in Oslo.

Røsland is married to Marit Berger Røsland, a former Minister of European Affairs, also affiliated the Conservative Party, and has two children. He is Catholic, said to be the first such individual to serve as mayor of Oslo since the Reformation.

== Political career ==
Røsland became politically involved in his youth through the Young Conservatives. He was the leader of the Oslo Young Conservatives from 1996 to 1998 and a member of the Young Conservatives' central board from 1998 to 2002. Røsland was named one of Norway's greatest leadership talents in 2009.

Røsland became a permanent member of Oslo City Council in 1999. As the youngest member of the Conservative City Council group, he became the leader of the party's culture and education faction. After being city council secretary for Trine Skei Grande and Kjell Veivåg, Røsland was city council secretary for governing mayor Erling Lae between 2001 and 2003. Back in the city council after the 2003 local elections, Røsland became a full-time politician and deputy chairman of the transport and environment committee. He later became faction leader of the urban development committee. He was deputy leader of the Conservative Party's city council group between 2005 and 2007.

Political offices
Preceded by André Støylen	Oslo City Commissioner of Finance; 2007–2009	Succeeded by Kristin Vinje
Preceded by Erling Lae	Governing mayor of Oslo; 2009–2015	Succeeded by Raymond Johansen
