= Norwegian Young Conservatives =

Political youth organization in Norway

- Founded: 1922
- Ideology: Liberal conservatism Pro-Europeanism
- Mother party: Conservative Party of Norway
- International affiliation: International Young Democrat Union (IYDU)
- European affiliation: Youth of the European People's Party (YEPP)
- Nordic affiliation: Nordic Young Conservative Union (NUU)
- Newspaper: Xtra (1922-2010)
- Website: ungehoyre.no

Norwegian Young Conservatives (Norwegian: Unge Høyres Landsforbund, UHL, normally referred to as Unge Høyre) is the Norwegian youth party of the Conservative Party. Its ideology is liberal conservatism.

The party has 3,078 members as of 2022.

== Leaders ==
- 1922–1924 Lorentz Vogt
- 1924–1925 Johs. Bøhn
- 1925–1928 Harald Heggland
- 1928–1931 Kristoffer Rostad
- 1931–1936 Andreas Norland
- 1936–1940 Arne Hoffstad
- 1945–1947 August D. Michelsen
- 1947–1950 Johan Møller Warmedal
- 1950–1954 Svenn Stray
- 1954–1955 Albert Nordengen
- 1955–1957 Otto Lyng
- 1957–1959 Erling Faaland
- 1959–1963 Jan P. Syse
- 1963–1965 Torstein Tynning
- 1965–1965 Henrik J. Lisæth
- 1965–1969 Ragnvald Dahl
- 1969–1971 Hans Svelland
- 1971–1973 Jan Petersen
- 1973–1977 Per Kristian Foss
- 1977–1979 Kaci Kullmann Five
- 1979–1980 Terje Osmundsen
- 1980–1984 Sveinung Lunde
- 1984–1986 Kai G. Henriksen
- 1986–1988 Trond Helleland
- 1988–1990 Børge Brende
- 1990–1994 Jan Tore Sanner
- 1994–1996 André Støylen
- 1996–1998 Bjørn Johnny Skaar
- 1998–2000 John-Ragnar Aarset
- 2000–2004 Ine Marie Eriksen
- 2004–2008 Torbjørn Røe Isaksen
- 2008–2012 Henrik Asheim
- 2012–2014 Paul Joakim Sandøy
- 2014–2018 Kristian Tonning Riise
- 2018–2020 Sandra Bruflot
- 2020–2026 Ola Svenneby
- 2026– Oda Sivertsen

=== Party Congresses ===
- 1. landsmøte 1922 21. February Kristiania haandverks og industriforenings storsal
- ekstraordinært landsmøte 1923 Oslo
- 3. 1924 6-7 June Bergen
- 4. 1925 5-6 August Bærum
- 5. 1927 6-7 June Oslo
- 6. 1928 14-15 September Porsgrunn
- 7. 1930 8-9 June Trondheim
- 8. 1931 22-23 August Sandefjord
- 9. 1933 4-5 June Drammen
- 10. 1934 13-14 March Oslo
- 11. 1936 at Pentecost in Tønsberg
- 12. 1937 14-15 March Oslo
- 13. 1945 18-19 August Høyres hus, Oslo
- 14. 1946 8-9 June Bergen
- ?. landsmøte 2004
- 50. landsmøte 2010 20 June Trondheim
- 51. landsmøte 2012 22-24. June
- 52. landsmøte 2014 20-22. June Sundvollen
- 53. landsmøte 2016 17-19. June Bergen
- 54. landsmøte 2018 22-24. June Oslo Airport, Gardermoen

== School election results ==
The UH participated in the so-called school elections in Norway.

Election	Votes	%	Seats	+/–
1989	23994	20.9 (#2)	0 / 165	First School election
1991	21052	17.4 (#2)	0 / 165	▼3.5
1993	18321	14.5 (#4)	26 / 165	▼2.9
1995	16324	14.3 (#2)	0 / 165	▼0.2
1997	11994	10.7 (#4)	0 / 165	▼3.6
1999	18350	17.9 (#3)	0 / 165	▲7.2
2001	16107	16.4 (#2)	29 / 165	▼1.5
2003	14067	12.9 (#4)	0 / 165	▼3.5
2005	14013	11.6 (#4)	22 / 169	▼1.3
2007	19906	17.5 (#3)	0 / 169	▲5.9
2009	20981	16.2 (#3)	30 / 169	▼1.3
2011	30195	24.0 (#3)	0 / 169	▲7.8
2013	22280	28.2 (#1)	53 / 169	▲4.2
2015	22762	16.4 (#2)	0 / 169	▼11.8
2017	22415	15.1 (#2)	27 / 169	▼1.3
2019	18363	13 (#2)	0 / 169	▼2.1
2021	16662	13.6 (#3)	0 / 169	▲0.6
2023	28762	21.7 (#1)	0 / 169	▲8.1
