= Monica Mæland =

Norwegian lawyer and politician

Monica Mæland MP
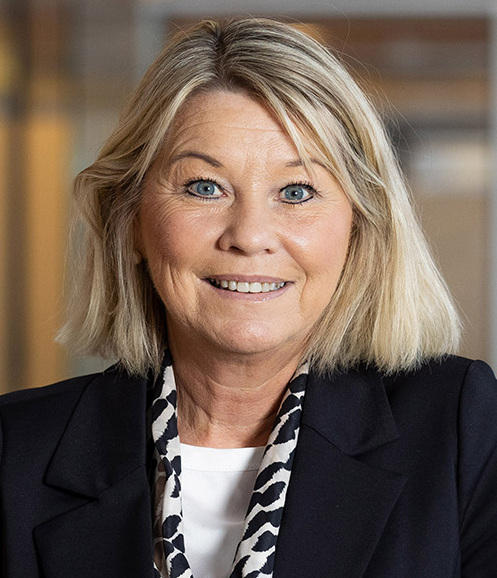
- Mæland in 2022

Minister of Justice and Public Security
- In office 24 January 2020 – 14 October 2021
- Prime Minister: Erna Solberg
- Preceded by: Jøran Kallmyr
- Succeeded by: Emilie Mehl

Minister of Local Government
- In office 17 January 2018 – 24 January 2020
- Prime Minister: Erna Solberg
- Preceded by: Jan Tore Sanner
- Succeeded by: Nikolai Astrup

Minister of Trade and Industry
- In office 16 October 2013 – 17 January 2018
- Prime Minister: Erna Solberg
- Preceded by: Trond Giske
- Succeeded by: Torbjørn Røe Isaksen

Chief Commissioner of Bergen
- In office 27 October 2003 – 17 October 2013
- Mayor: Herman Friele; Gunnar Bakke; Trude Drevland
- Preceded by: Anne-Grete Strøm-Erichsen
- Succeeded by: Ragnhild Stolt-Nielsen

Deputy Member of the Storting
- In office 1 October 2001 – 30 September 2005
- Constituency: Hordaland

Personal details
- Born: 6 February 1968 (age 58) Bergen, Hordaland, Norway
- Party: Conservative
- Spouse: Tom Schmidt Mæland
- Children: 2
- Education: University of Bergen

Monica Mæland (born 6 February 1968) is a Norwegian politician for the Conservative Party who served as Minister of Justice from 2020 to 2021. Previously she served as Minister Local Government from 2018 to 2020, and Minister of Trade and Industry from 2013 to 2018. In local politics, she was the Chief Commissioner of Bergen from 2003 to 2013, and leader of the Hordaland Conservatives from 2002 to 2004.

== Background ==
Mæland was born in Bergen and grew up in Arendal. She holds a cand.jur. degree from the University of Bergen (1994), and practiced as a lawyer until entering politics full-time.

== Political career ==
=== Local politics ===
Mæland was elected to the City Council in Bergen in 1999, and was a member until she became Chief Commissioner. She formed her first cabinet on 27 October 2003. The first Mæland cabinet held a minority of the votes in the city council, and consisted of the Conservative Party, the Christian Democratic Party and the Liberal Party. After the 2007 local election she formed her second cabinet, a majority cabinet, consisting of the Christian Democratic Party and the Progress Party. The Progress Party left the cabinet on 28 April 2009, due to a disagreement about continuing the lifespan of the toll ring financing the Bergen Program for Transport, Urban Development and the Environment. The party reentered the cabinet a year later, and the political cooperation was resumed based on the agreement signed after the 2007 election.

After the 2011 election, Mæland formed her third cabinet, with the same parties as in her latter cabinet.

Mæland was also the leader, and prior to that, deputy leader, of the County branch of the Conservative Party.

Mæland is the second Chief Commissioner in Bergen after the parliamentary system was introduced in 2000, and the only one to have won re-election.

=== Minister ===
When Solberg's cabinet was formed in October 2013, Mæland was appointed Minister of Trade and Industry, a post she held until January 2018. In January 2018, she was appointed Minister of Local Government after the Liberal Party entered the cabinet. She overlook the county and municipal mergers that started in early 2018 and was finalized by January 2020. Later in January 2020, she was appointed Minister of Justice after the Progress Party withdrew from the Solberg cabinet.

Political offices
| Preceded by Anne-Grete Strøm-Erichsen | Chief Commissioner of Bergen; 2003–2013 | Succeeded by Ragnhild Stolt-Nielsen |
| Preceded by Trond Giske | Minister of Trade and Industry; 2013–2018 | Succeeded by Torbjørn Røe Isaksen |
| Preceded by Jan Tore Sanner | Minister of Local Government; 2018–2020 | Succeeded by Nikolai Astrup |
| Preceded by Jøran Kallmyr | Minister of Justice; 2020–2021 | Succeeded by Emilie Enger Mehl |
