= Robert Eriksson (politician) =

Norwegian politician (born 1974)

Robert Eriksson MP
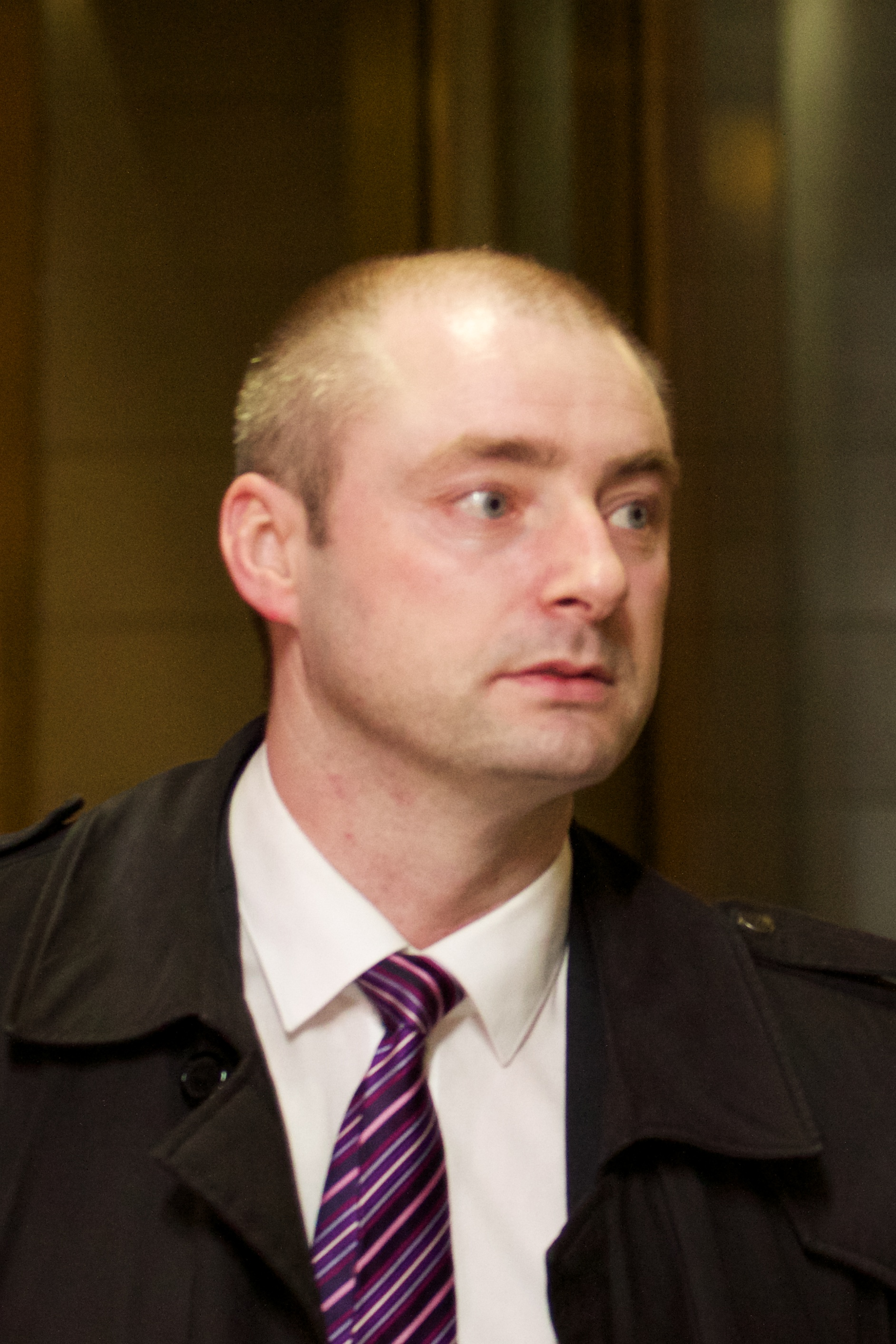

Minister of Labour and Social Inclusion
- In office 16 October 2013 – 16 December 2015
- Prime Minister: Erna Solberg
- Preceded by: Anniken Huitfeldt
- Succeeded by: Anniken Hauglie

Member of the Norwegian Parliament
- In office 1 October 2005 – 30 September 2013
- Constituency: Nord-Trøndelag

Personal details
- Born: 23 April 1974 (age 52) Levanger Municipality, Nord-Trøndelag, Norway
- Party: Progress
- Domestic partner: Ulrikke Holmøy
- Children: 5
- Education: Nord-Trøndelag University College

Robert Eriksson (born 23 April 1974) is a Norwegian politician for the Progress Party. He served as Minister of Labour and Social Inclusion in Solberg's Cabinet from 2013 to 2015.

He was elected to the Norwegian Parliament from Nord-Trøndelag in 2005. He had previously served in the position of deputy representative during the terms 1997–2001 and 2001–2005. Eriksson held various positions in the municipal council of Verdal Municipality from 1991 to 2005. From 1995 to 2005 he was also a member of The Nord-Trøndelag county council.

== Early life and education ==
Eriksson was born on 23 April 1974 in Levanger Municipality in Nord-Trøndelag county. His parents are truck driver Gjermund Eriksson (1955–) and mother Rita Helene Musum (1956–) who worked as an office manager. He attended elementary school at Ness Elementary School between 1981 and 1987, and Verdalsøra lower secondary school between 1987 and 1990.

Later he enrolled at the Verdal Upper Secondary School between 1990 and 1993. After finishing secondary school, he was drafted into the Norwegian army serving his mandatory service from 1993 to 1994. He later studied corporate economy at the Nord-Trøndelag University College.

== Career ==
=== Local politics ===
Eriksson was chairman of the Nord-Trøndelag Progress Party's Youth from 1991 to 1994, a member of the Progress Party's Youth Central Board from 1995 to 1996 and 1998 to 2000, and political deputy chairman of the Progress Party's Youth from 1998 to 2000. He was also chairman of the Verdal Progress Party from 1992 to 1993, a member of the Verdal municipal council from 1992 to 2011, a group leader from 1995 to 2006, a member of the presidency from 1999 to 2005 and member of the Innherred joint municipality board from 2003 to 2005.

Eriksson was also a member of Nord-Trøndelag County Council 1995–2005, group leader 1997–2006, a member of the county committee 1999–2003, and chairman of Nord-Trøndelag Progress Party from 2002–2008. Before he was elected to the Storting in 2005, Eriksson served as 1st Deputy Representative from 1997–2005. He ran for re-election in 2013, but the Progress Party did not get enough votes in Nord-Trøndelag to get a representative from there.

=== Minister of Labour and Social Inclusion ===
Following the 2013 election, Eriksson was appointed minister of labour and social inclusion in the Solberg cabinet.

In March 2014, Eriksson pointed criticism against the fishing industry for their "cowboy culture" and asked them to get rid of it. His criticism came in the wake of revelations that Romanian workers had been told to hide their real work hours from the Norwegian Labour Inspection Authority. Eriksson told NRK that "I think it is important to get a signal to everyone who works in the fishing industry that they must adhere to the laws and rules that apply in Norwegian working life. Cowboy culture is not desirable in any sector".

In April, he expressed that growth and rehabilitation companies should get increased competition after findings that only one out of five people could get an average paying job in a rehabilitation company. He emphasised that more parts should be able to participate and that a larger proportion of the services would be put out to tender so that more people could offer innovative solutions.

In June, the leader of Oslo LO, Roy Pedersen, led protests against Eriksson after he had proposed changes in the Working Environment Act. Pedersen stated that "we are not going back to that a Norwegian worker is going to stand with a hat in hand ask for a job". In response, Eriksson stated: "LO leader Gerd Kristiansen said after I took office that they should act constructively. Little has been seen. And what Pedersen says here is neither constructive nor correct", and went on to add:

"What I do is I give power back to the nurse and other employees, so that they can to a greater extent choose what kind of framework they want around their job, so that they can agree with their employer what is the best solution for them. Many have separated and have children every other week. Then it is good to be able to have schemes that are flexible and that can be adapted to the individual, but within the safe framework that will still be the basis."

In September 2015, he welcomed and presented the new director of the Norwegian Labour and Welfare Administration, Sigrun Vågeng at a press conference. Eriksson expressed that he was "very proud to stand here today and have Sigrun Vågeng by my side. I am extremely thankful to have gotten the director that I asked for".

He was forced to step down against his will as minister on 16 December 2015, following a reshuffle. The Progress Party had also decided that Eriksson was going to be replaced. According to election researcher Anders Todal Jenssen, the dismissal was because the "weakest ministers [were] replaced with new strong politicians" ahead of the parliamentary elections in 2017. In a book release, Eriksson, after he had to resign, made strong accusations against both the officials in the Ministry of Labour and Social Affairs, the Prime Minister's Office, the management of the Directorate of Labour and Welfare and the Progress Party management, and claimed that they were "in kahoots" against him, and took a stand against the decision to remove him from the cabinet. Dagsavisen wrote that Eriksson "had an extremely bad tone with his civil service".

=== Post-government ===
After his time as Minister of Labour, he started working on 1 August 2016 as a consultant in the PR agency MSLGROUP and announced that he would not be on the Progress Party's list for the next parliamentary election.

On 12 June 2017, he took over as leader of the industry association Norske Sjømatbedrifters Landsforening.

== Personal life ==
Eriksson became engaged to his former advisor Ulrikke Holmøy in February 2017. Rumours about their romance had circulated during his term as labour minister, but both he and Holmøy claimed they didn't pursue their relationship before they both left the ministry. Eriksson has four children from a previous relationship, and one with Holmøy.
