= List of members of the Storting, 2025–2029 =

The list includes everyone who was elected to the Storting in the 2025 Norwegian parliamentary election on 8 September 2025.

There are a total of 169 representatives. 150 district mandates were elected in addition to one equalization mandate from each county (a total of 19). In accordance with Section 68 of the Constitution, the new representatives of the Storting will take office on the first "søgnedag" (working day) in October, i.e. Wednesday, 1 October 2025.

== Representatives ==
Names of representatives marked in pink are equalization mandates.

Seat	Name	Party	Constituency (county)	Note/Substitute
1	Marius Arion Nilsen	FrP	Aust-Agder	
2	Tellef Inge Mørland	Ap	Aust-Agder	
3	Haagen Poppe	H	Aust-Agder	
4	Jørgen H. Kristiansen	KrF	Aust-Agder	
5	Alf Erik Andersen	FrP	Vest-Agder	
6	Kai Steffen Østensen	Ap	Vest-Agder	
7	Stian Storbukås	FrP	Vest-Agder	
8	Amalie Gunnufsen	H	Vest-Agder	
9	Jorunn Gleditsch Lossius	KrF	Vest-Agder	
10	Mirell Høyer-Berntsen	SV	Vest-Agder	
11	Tonje Brenna	Ap	Akershus	
12	Hans Andreas Limi	FrP	Akershus	
13	Åsmund Grøver Aukrust	Ap	Akershus	
14	Himanshu Gulati	FrP	Akershus	
15	Henrik Asheim	H	Akershus	
16	Tuva Moflag	Ap	Akershus	
17	Tone Wilhelmsen Trøen	H	Akershus	
18	Liv Gustavsen	FrP	Akershus	
19	Sverre Myrli	Ap	Akershus	
20	Anne Kristine Linnestad	H	Akershus	
21	Anette Carnarius Elseth	FrP	Akershus	
22	Mani Hussaini	Ap	Akershus	
23	Kari Sofie Bjørnsen	H	Akershus	
24	Tom Staahle	FrP	Akershus	
25	Ragnhild Bergheim	Ap	Akershus	
26	Abid Raja	V	Akershus	
27	Une Aina Bastholm	MDG	Akershus	
28	Kirsti Bergstø	SV	Akershus	
29	Marie Sneve Martinussen	R	Akershus	
30	Ida Lindtveit Røse	KrF	Akershus	
31	Masud Gharahkhani	Ap	Buskerud	
32	Jon Helgheim	FrP	Buskerud	
33	Solveig Vestenfor	Ap	Buskerud	
34	Nils Morten Wold	FrP	Buskerud	
35	Trond Helleland	H	Buskerud	
36	Even Amandus Røed	Ap	Buskerud	
37	Morgan Engebretsen Langfeldt	FrP	Buskerud	
38	Kathy Lie	SV	Buskerud	
39	Marianne Sivertsen Næss	Ap	Finnmark	
40	Bengt Rune Strifeldt	FrP	Finnmark	
41	Sigurd Kvammen Rafaelsen	Ap	Finnmark	
42	Siren Julianne Jensen	MDG	Finnmark	
43	Nils Kristen Sandtrøen	Ap	Hedmark	
44	Lise Selnes	Ap	Hedmark	
45	Tor Andre Johnsen	FrP	Hedmark	
46	Trygve Slagsvold Vedum	Sp	Hedmark	
47	Even Hemstad Eriksen	Ap	Hedmark	
48	Morten Kolbjørnsen	FrP	Hedmark	
49	Anna Irene Molberg	H	Hedmark	
50	Lubna Jaffery	Ap	Hordaland	
51	Helge André Njåstad	FrP	Hordaland	
52	Rune Bakervik	Ap	Hordaland	
53	Silje Hjemdal	FrP	Hordaland	
54	Erna Solberg	H	Hordaland	
55	Linda Merkesdal	Ap	Hordaland	
56	Martin Jonsterhaug	FrP	Hordaland	
57	Ove Bernt Trellevik	H	Hordaland	
58	Benjamin Jakobsen	Ap	Hordaland	
59	Stig Atle Abrahamsen	FrP	Hordaland	
60	Peter Christian Frølich	H	Hordaland	
61	Marthe Hammer	SV	Hordaland	
62	Sofie Marhaug	R	Hordaland	
63	Joel Ystebø	KrF	Hordaland	
64	Frøya Sjursæther	MDG	Hordaland	
65	Kjersti Toppe	Sp	Hordaland	
66	Sylvi Listhaug	FrP	Møre og Romsdal	
67	Frank Sve	FrP	Møre og Romsdal	
68	Per Vidar Kjølmoen	Ap	Møre og Romsdal	
69	Åse Kristin Ask Bakke	Ap	Møre og Romsdal	
70	Joakim Myklebost Tangen	FrP	Møre og Romsdal	
71	Monica Molvær	H	Møre og Romsdal	
72	Geir Inge Lien	Sp	Møre og Romsdal	
73	Harry Valderhaug	KrF	Møre og Romsdal	
74	Bjørnar Skjæran	Ap	Nordland	
75	Dagfinn Henrik Olsen	FrP	Nordland	
76	Mona Nilsen	Ap	Nordland	
77	Bjørn Larsen	FrP	Nordland	
78	Øystein Mathisen	Ap	Nordland	
79	Bård Ludvig Thorheim	H	Nordland	
80	Bent-Joacim Bentzen	Sp	Nordland	
81	Hilde Grande	FrP	Nordland	
82	Geir-Asbjørn Jørgensen	R	Nordland	
83	Rune Støstad	Ap	Oppland	
84	Anne Hagenborg	Ap	Oppland	
85	Lars Rem	FrP	Oppland	
86	Bengt Fasteraune	Sp	Oppland	
87	Finn Krokeide	FrP	Oppland	
88	Anne Lise Fredlund	SV	Oppland	
89	Jonas Gahr Støre	Ap	Oslo	
90	Kamzy Gunaratnam	Ap	Oslo	
91	Ine Eriksen Søreide	H	Oslo	
92	Jan Christian Vestre	Ap	Oslo	
93	Tor Mikkel Wara	FrP	Oslo	
94	Nikolai Astrup	H	Oslo	
95	Agnes Nærland Viljugrein	Ap	Oslo	
96	Simen Velle	FrP	Oslo	
97	Marian Hussein	SV	Oslo	
98	Mudassar Hussain Kapur	H	Oslo	
99	Arild Hermstad	MDG	Oslo	
100	Frode Jacobsen	Ap	Oslo	
101	Seher Aydar	R	Oslo	
102	Guri Melby	V	Oslo	
103	Sunniva Holmås Eidsvoll	SV	Oslo	
104	Aina Stenersen	FrP	Oslo	
105	Ingrid Liland	MDG	Oslo	
106	Mathilde Tybring-Gjedde	H	Oslo	
107	Grunde Almeland	V	Oslo	
108	Bjørnar Moxnes	R	Oslo	
109	Kristoffer Sivertsen	FrP	Rogaland	
110	Pål Morten Borgli	FrP	Rogaland	
111	Andreas Bjelland Eriksen	Ap	Rogaland	
112	Ruth Mariann Hop	Ap	Rogaland	
113	May Helen Hetland Ervik	FrP	Rogaland	
114	Margret Hagerup	H	Rogaland	
115	Julia Eikeland	Ap	Rogaland	
116	Rune Midtun	FrP	Rogaland	
117	Aleksander Stokkebø	H	Rogaland	
118	Jonas Andersen Sayed	KrF	Rogaland	
119	Morten Sandanger	Ap	Rogaland	
120	Mímir Kristjánsson	R	Rogaland	
121	Geir Pollestad	Sp	Rogaland	
122	Ingrid Fiskaa	SV	Rogaland	
123	Torbjørn Vereide	Ap	Sogn og Fjordane	
124	Stig Even Søvik Lillestøl	FrP	Sogn og Fjordane	
125	Erling Sande	Sp	Sogn og Fjordane	
126	Marius Langballe Dalin	MDG	Sogn og Fjordane	
127	Terje Aasland	Ap	Telemark	
128	Bård André Hoksrud	FrP	Telemark	
129	Lene Vågslid	Ap	Telemark	
130	Line Marlene Haugen	FrP	Telemark	
131	Mahmoud Farahmand	H	Telemark	
132	Hans Edvard Askjer	KrF	Telemark	
133	Cecilie Myrseth	Ap	Troms	
134	Per-Willy Amundsen	FrP	Troms	
135	Nils-Ole Foshaug	Ap	Troms	
136	Kristian August Eilertsen	FrP	Troms	
137	Erlend Svardal Bøe	H	Troms	
138	Hanne Beate Stenvaag	R	Troms	
139	Bente Estil	Ap	Nord-Trøndelag	
140	Vebjørn Gorseth	Ap	Nord-Trøndelag	
141	Mats Henriksen	FrP	Nord-Trøndelag	
142	Bjørn Arild Gram	Sp	Nord-Trøndelag	
143	Oda Indgaard	MDG	Nord-Trøndelag	
144	Trond Giske	Ap	Sør-Trøndelag	
145	Anniken Refseth	Ap	Sør-Trøndelag	
146	Lill Harriet Sandaune	FrP	Sør-Trøndelag	
147	Isak Veierud Busch	Ap	Sør-Trøndelag	
148	Rikard Spets	FrP	Sør-Trøndelag	
149	Mari Holm Lønseth	H	Sør-Trøndelag	
150	Kristine Solli	Ap	Sør-Trøndelag	
151	Lars Haltbrekken	SV	Sør-Trøndelag	
152	Maren Grøthe	Sp	Sør-Trøndelag	
153	Hege Bae Nyholt	R	Sør-Trøndelag	
154	Truls Vasvik	Ap	Vestfold	
155	Morten Stordalen	FrP	Vestfold	
156	Maria-Karine Aasen-Svensrud	Ap	Vestfold	
157	Bjørn-Kristian Svendsrud	FrP	Vestfold	
158	Erlend Larsen	H	Vestfold	
159	Anne Grethe Hauan	FrP	Vestfold	
160	Julie Estdahl Stuestøl	MDG	Vestfold	
161	Jon-Ivar Nygård	Ap	Østfold	
162	Erlend Wiborg	FrP	Østfold	
163	Elise Waagen	Ap	Østfold	
164	Bjørnar Laabak	FrP	Østfold	
165	Hashim Abdi	Ap	Østfold	
166	Julia Brännström Nordtug	FrP	Østfold	
167	Tage Pettersen	H	Østfold	
168	Solveig Vitanza	Ap	Østfold	
169	Remi Alexander Sølvberg	R	Østfold	

== Replacement members ==
- Sandra Bruflot
- Jone Blikra
- Tobias Linge
- Solveig Vik
- June Trengereid Gruer
- Marie Østensen
- Tom Einar Karlsen
- Monica Nielsen
- Ronny Aukrust
- Farahnaz Bahrami
- Kari Baadstrand Sandnes
- Trine Lise Sundnes
- Konstanse Marie Alvær
- Farukh Qureshi
- Henrik Gottfries Kierulf
