= Østensen =

Østensen is a surname of Norwegian origin meaning "son of Østen".

== People with the surname ==
- Cecilie Østensen Berglund (born 1971), Norwegian judge
- Even Østensen (born 1993), Norwegian footballer
- Kai Steffen Østensen (born 1994), Norwegian politician
- Kåre Østensen (born 1943), Norwegian ice hockey player
- Marie Østensen (born 1978), Norwegian politician
- Olaf Østensen (born 1950), Norwegian civil servant
- Østen Østensen (1878–1939), Norwegian rifle shooter
- Simen Østensen (born 1984), Norwegian cross-country skier

== See also ==
- Österlen
