= Eivind Drivenes =

Norwegian politician (born 1969)

Eivind Drivenes (born 29 August 1969) is a Norwegian politician for the Centre Party.

He became a member of the municipal council of Vennesla Municipality in 1995, and was re-elected six times. The last term, from 2019 to 2023, he served as deputy mayor. He served as a deputy representative to the Parliament of Norway from Vest-Agder during the term 2021–2025. In total he met during more than 1 year of parliamentary session, partly owing to the regular representative Anja Ninasdotter Abusland going into maternity leave.

Drivenes has worked as a driver, gardener, salesman for Felleskjøpet and parks attendant. According to his own statement, he felled "a couple of thousand trees". In 2024 he became general manager of the store Bondekompaniet.
