= Udjus =

Udjus is a surname. Notable people with the surname include:

- Ingelise Udjus (1920–2001), Norwegian resistance member, educator, and civil servant
- Kenneth Udjus (born 1983), Norwegian footballer
- Ragnar Udjus (born 1933), Norwegian media personality and politician
