= Vest-Agder (Storting constituency) =

Constituency of the Storting, the national legislature of Norway

- Constituency for the Storting
- Location of Vest-Agder within Norway
- Municipality: List: Åseral; Farsund; Flekkefjord; Hægebostad; Kristiansand; Kvinesdal; Lindesnes; Lyngdal; Sirdal; Vennesla
- County: Agder
- Population: 198,591 (2025)
- Electorate: 144,910 (2025)
- Area: 7,278 km^{2} (2025)

Current constituency
- Created: 1921
- Seats: List: 5 (1953–present); 4 (1921–1953)
- Members of the Storting: List: Alf Erik Andersen (FrP); Amalie Gunnufsen (H); Mirell Høyer-Berntsen (SV); Jorunn Gleditsch Lossius (KrF); Kai Steffen Østensen (Ap); Stian Storbukås (FrP)
- Created from: List: Lister; Lyngdal; Mandalen; Oddernes

Vest-Agder (lit. transl. West Agder) is one of the 19 multi-member constituencies of the Storting, the national legislature of Norway. The constituency was established in 1921 following the introduction of proportional representation for elections to the Storting. It consists of the municipalities of Åseral, Farsund, Flekkefjord, Hægebostad, Kristiansand, Kvinesdal, Lindesnes, Lyngdal, Sirdal, and Vennesla in the county of Agder. The constituency currently elects five of the 169 members of the Storting using the open party-list proportional representation electoral system. At the 2025 parliamentary election it had 144,910 registered electors.

== Electoral system ==
Vest-Agder currently elects five of the 169 members of the Storting using the open (Note: Although technically elections to the Storting have open lists, they are in effect closed lists as a majority of those voting for a party must make changes to the lists for the changes to take effect, which has never happened since the introduction of proportional representation in 1921, and as result candidates are elected in the order submitted by the party.) party-list proportional representation electoral system. Constituency seats are allocated by the County Electoral Committee using the Modified Sainte-Laguë method. Compensatory seats (seats at large or levelling seats) are calculated based on the national vote and are allocated by the National Electoral Committee using the Modified Sainte-Laguë method at the constituency level (one for each constituency). Only parties that reach the 4% national threshold compete for compensatory seats.

== Election results ==
=== Summary ===
| Election | Communists K | | | Reds R / RV / FMS | | | Socialist Left SV / SF | | | Labour Ap | | | Greens MDG | | | Centre Sp / Bp / L | | | Liberals V | | | Christian Democrats KrF | | | Conservatives H | | | Progress FrP / ALP | | |
| Election | Votes | % | Seats | Votes | % | Seats | Votes | % | Seats | Votes | % | Seats | Votes | % | Seats | Votes | % | Seats | Votes | % | Seats | Votes | % | Seats | Votes | % | Seats | Votes | % | Seats |
|---|---|---|---|---|---|---|---|---|---|---|---|---|---|---|---|---|---|---|---|---|---|---|---|---|---|---|---|---|---|---|
| 2025 | 50 | 0.04% | 0 | 4,636 | 4.01% | 0 | 4,482 | 3.88% | 0 | 26,372 | 22.83% | 1 | 4,040 | 3.50% | 0 | 4,663 | 4.04% | 0 | 3,581 | 3.10% | 0 | 15,003 | 12.99% | 1 | 15,609 | 13.51% | 1 | 31,950 | 27.65% | 2 |
| 2021 | | | | 3,355 | 3.19% | 0 | 5,615 | 5.34% | 0 | 21,845 | 20.78% | 1 | 3,330 | 3.17% | 0 | 10,859 | 10.33% | 1 | 3,834 | 3.65% | 0 | 14,598 | 13.88% | 1 | 22,359 | 21.26% | 1 | 13,821 | 13.14% | 1 |
| 2017 | | | | 1,376 | 1.36% | 0 | 4,333 | 4.29% | 0 | 21,238 | 21.04% | 1 | 2,911 | 2.88% | 0 | 6,542 | 6.48% | 0 | 3,654 | 3.62% | 0 | 12,747 | 12.63% | 1 | 28,146 | 27.88% | 2 | 17,284 | 17.12% | 1 |
| 2013 | 41 | 0.04% | 0 | 460 | 0.47% | 0 | 2,568 | 2.63% | 0 | 23,227 | 23.79% | 1 | 2,196 | 2.25% | 0 | 2,962 | 3.03% | 0 | 4,205 | 4.31% | 0 | 13,536 | 13.86% | 1 | 26,818 | 27.47% | 2 | 17,863 | 18.29% | 1 |
| 2009 | 34 | 0.04% | 0 | 427 | 0.46% | 0 | 3,647 | 3.95% | 0 | 24,450 | 26.47% | 1 | 322 | 0.35% | 0 | 3,296 | 3.57% | 0 | 2,876 | 3.11% | 0 | 14,337 | 15.52% | 1 | 16,214 | 17.55% | 1 | 25,296 | 27.38% | 2 |
| 2005 | 46 | 0.05% | 0 | 317 | 0.35% | 0 | 5,884 | 6.52% | 0 | 21,590 | 23.93% | 1 | 214 | 0.24% | 0 | 3,812 | 4.23% | 0 | 4,891 | 5.42% | 0 | 17,057 | 18.91% | 1 | 13,266 | 14.70% | 1 | 21,609 | 23.95% | 2 |
| 2001 | 41 | 0.05% | 0 | 329 | 0.38% | 0 | 8,924 | 10.44% | 0 | 14,303 | 16.73% | 1 | 196 | 0.23% | 0 | 3,097 | 3.62% | 0 | 3,001 | 3.51% | 0 | 22,372 | 26.17% | 2 | 19,813 | 23.18% | 2 | 9,173 | 10.73% | 0 |
| 1997 | 46 | 0.05% | 0 | 622 | 0.72% | 0 | 3,014 | 3.47% | 0 | 22,769 | 26.20% | 1 | 197 | 0.23% | 0 | 6,020 | 6.93% | 0 | 3,481 | 4.01% | 0 | 22,826 | 26.26% | 2 | 11,813 | 13.59% | 1 | 15,347 | 17.66% | 1 |
| 1993 | | | | 254 | 0.31% | 0 | 3,923 | 4.79% | 0 | 22,785 | 27.82% | 2 | 126 | 0.15% | 0 | 13,411 | 16.38% | 1 | 2,853 | 3.48% | 0 | 15,920 | 19.44% | 1 | 13,164 | 16.07% | 1 | 5,553 | 6.78% | 0 |
| 1989 | | | | 287 | 0.32% | 0 | 4,824 | 5.46% | 0 | 20,953 | 23.72% | 2 | 469 | 0.53% | 0 | 3,774 | 4.27% | 0 | 3,692 | 4.18% | 0 | 17,186 | 19.45% | 1 | 19,814 | 22.43% | 1 | 15,685 | 17.76% | 1 |
| 1985 | 59 | 0.07% | 0 | 173 | 0.20% | 0 | 2,165 | 2.55% | 0 | 26,314 | 30.98% | 2 | | | | 6,837 | 8.05% | 0 | 2,522 | 2.97% | 0 | 15,183 | 17.88% | 1 | 26,480 | 31.18% | 2 | 3,279 | 3.86% | 0 |
| 1981 | 98 | 0.12% | 0 | 220 | 0.27% | 0 | 1,908 | 2.37% | 0 | 21,551 | 26.74% | 2 | | | | 6,664 | 8.27% | 0 | 3,016 | 3.74% | 0 | 15,388 | 19.10% | 1 | 27,699 | 34.37% | 2 | 3,121 | 3.87% | 0 |
| 1977 | 100 | 0.14% | 0 | 158 | 0.22% | 0 | 1,568 | 2.15% | 0 | 21,846 | 29.93% | 2 | | | | 9,722 | 13.32% | 1 | | | | 18,165 | 24.88% | 1 | 19,334 | 26.48% | 1 | 1,940 | 2.66% | 0 |
| 1973 | | | | 111 | 0.17% | 0 | 4,699 | 7.02% | 0 | 16,289 | 24.33% | 2 | | | | 7,595 | 11.34% | 1 | 3,119 | 4.66% | 0 | 14,628 | 21.85% | 1 | 9,956 | 14.87% | 1 | 4,933 | 7.37% | 0 |
| 1969 | 282 | 0.44% | 0 | | | | 1,637 | 2.53% | 0 | 21,337 | 33.01% | 2 | | | | 7,666 | 11.86% | 0 | 13,590 | 21.02% | 1 | 10,043 | 15.54% | 1 | 10,087 | 15.60% | 1 | | | |
| 1965 | | | | | | | 2,643 | 4.32% | 0 | 19,413 | 31.71% | 2 | | | | 6,005 | 9.81% | 0 | 15,045 | 24.58% | 1 | 7,794 | 12.73% | 1 | 10,313 | 16.85% | 1 | | | |
| 1961 | 741 | 1.39% | 0 | | | | | | | 18,569 | 34.75% | 2 | | | | | | | 18,770 | 35.12% | 2 | 7,684 | 14.38% | 1 | 7,676 | 14.36% | 0 | | | |
| 1957 | 665 | 1.26% | 0 | | | | | | | 18,092 | 34.22% | 2 | | | | 6,948 | 13.14% | 1 | 13,908 | 26.31% | 1 | 6,569 | 12.43% | 0 | 6,680 | 12.64% | 1 | | | |
| 1953 | 891 | 1.72% | 0 | | | | | | | 17,539 | 33.85% | 2 | | | | 6,430 | 12.41% | 0 | 12,814 | 24.73% | 1 | 6,494 | 12.53% | 1 | 7,643 | 14.75% | 1 | | | |
| 1949 | 456 | 1.37% | 0 | | | | | | | 9,488 | 28.43% | 1 | | | | | | | 9,600 | 28.77% | 2 | 4,245 | 12.72% | 0 | 9,472 | 28.39% | 1 | | | |
| 1945 | | | | | | | | | | 8,467 | 30.23% | 1 | | | | 5,390 | 19.25% | 1 | 10,410 | 37.17% | 2 | | | | 3,737 | 13.34% | 0 | | | |
| 1936 | | | | | | | | | | 6,188 | 21.13% | 1 | | | | 6,530 | 22.29% | 1 | 11,089 | 37.86% | 1 | | | | 5,007 | 17.09% | 1 | | | |
| 1933 | | | | | | | | | | 4,435 | 18.07% | 1 | | | | 6,760 | 27.55% | 1 | 8,676 | 35.35% | 1 | | | | 4,669 | 19.03% | 1 | | | |
| 1930 | | | | | | | | | | 3,248 | 13.34% | 0 | | | | 6,754 | 27.74% | 1 | 10,055 | 41.30% | 2 | | | | 4,288 | 17.61% | 1 | | | |
| 1927 | | | | | | | | | | 3,506 | 20.66% | 1 | | | | 5,115 | 30.13% | 1 | 5,616 | 33.09% | 2 | | | | 2,736 | 16.12% | 0 | | | |
| 1924 | | | | | | | | | | 1,711 | 10.55% | 0 | | | | 4,393 | 27.08% | 1 | 6,504 | 40.09% | 2 | | | | 3,617 | 22.29% | 1 | | | |
| 1921 | | | | | | | | | | 1,622 | 9.36% | 0 | | | | 4,895 | 28.24% | 1 | 6,822 | 39.36% | 2 | | | | 3,628 | 20.93% | 1 | | | |

(Excludes compensatory seats. Figures in italics represent joint lists.)

=== Detailed ===
==== 2020s ====
===== 2025 =====
Results of the 2025 parliamentary election held on 8 September 2025:

| Party | | Votes per municipality | | | | | | | | | | Total votes | % | Seats | | |
| Party | | Åseral | Farsund | Flekke- fjord | Hæge- bostad | Kristian- sand | Kvines- dal | Lindes- nes | Lyngdal | Sirdal | Venne- sla | Total votes | % | Con. | Com. | Tot. |
|---|---|---|---|---|---|---|---|---|---|---|---|---|---|---|---|---|
| Progress Party | FrP | 128 | 2,099 | 1,930 | 347 | 16,686 | 1,228 | 4,304 | 2,075 | 328 | 2,825 | 31,950 | 27.65% | 2 | 0 | 2 |
| Labour Party | Ap | 107 | 1,232 | 1,068 | 106 | 17,402 | 741 | 2,775 | 885 | 182 | 1,874 | 26,372 | 22.83% | 1 | 0 | 1 |
| Conservative Party | H | 30 | 650 | 694 | 72 | 10,630 | 291 | 1,702 | 654 | 115 | 771 | 15,609 | 13.51% | 1 | 0 | 1 |
| Christian Democratic Party | KrF | 86 | 610 | 582 | 279 | 8,446 | 445 | 1,451 | 1,293 | 146 | 1,665 | 15,003 | 12.99% | 1 | 0 | 1 |
| Centre Party | Sp | 132 | 333 | 293 | 155 | 1,532 | 285 | 885 | 395 | 169 | 484 | 4,663 | 4.04% | 0 | 0 | 0 |
| Red Party | R | 13 | 195 | 193 | 27 | 3,067 | 128 | 524 | 166 | 45 | 278 | 4,636 | 4.01% | 0 | 0 | 0 |
| Socialist Left Party | SV | 11 | 191 | 154 | 9 | 3,220 | 74 | 472 | 93 | 16 | 242 | 4,482 | 3.88% | 0 | 1 | 1 |
| Green Party | MDG | 3 | 111 | 104 | 9 | 3,101 | 83 | 381 | 92 | 23 | 133 | 4,040 | 3.50% | 0 | 0 | 0 |
| Liberal Party | V | 4 | 142 | 102 | 8 | 2,487 | 37 | 527 | 102 | 29 | 143 | 3,581 | 3.10% | 0 | 0 | 0 |
| Conservative | K | 11 | 85 | 43 | 41 | 743 | 66 | 186 | 125 | 18 | 207 | 1,525 | 1.32% | 0 | 0 | 0 |
| Pensioners' Party | PP | 1 | 33 | 19 | 2 | 597 | 17 | 92 | 23 | 5 | 88 | 877 | 0.76% | 0 | 0 | 0 |
| Norway Democrats | ND | 5 | 44 | 37 | 5 | 331 | 35 | 70 | 56 | 11 | 93 | 687 | 0.59% | 0 | 0 | 0 |
| Generation Party | GP | 3 | 37 | 29 | 6 | 351 | 31 | 108 | 30 | 5 | 54 | 654 | 0.57% | 0 | 0 | 0 |
| Industry and Business Party | INP | 4 | 37 | 33 | 7 | 255 | 39 | 113 | 55 | 6 | 42 | 591 | 0.51% | 0 | 0 | 0 |
| Center Party | PS | 2 | 5 | 5 | 4 | 200 | 3 | 14 | 9 | 4 | 24 | 270 | 0.23% | 0 | 0 | 0 |
| Peace and Justice | FOR | 1 | 17 | 17 | 0 | 158 | 5 | 29 | 5 | 1 | 17 | 250 | 0.22% | 0 | 0 | 0 |
| Welfare and Innovation Party | VIP | 1 | 5 | 3 | 0 | 86 | 7 | 30 | 4 | 0 | 10 | 146 | 0.13% | 0 | 0 | 0 |
| DNI Party | DNI | 6 | 4 | 3 | 1 | 80 | 4 | 26 | 5 | 1 | 15 | 145 | 0.13% | 0 | 0 | 0 |
| Communist Party of Norway | K | 0 | 1 | 0 | 0 | 39 | 1 | 4 | 0 | 0 | 5 | 50 | 0.04% | 0 | 0 | 0 |
| Valid votes | | 548 | 5,831 | 5,309 | 1,078 | 69,411 | 3,520 | 13,693 | 6,067 | 1,104 | 8,970 | 115,531 | 100.00% | 5 | 1 | 6 |
| Blank votes | | 3 | 39 | 32 | 5 | 539 | 19 | 99 | 34 | 5 | 84 | 859 | 0.74% | | | |
| Rejected votes – other | | 0 | 17 | 14 | 0 | 109 | 7 | 42 | 11 | 3 | 3 | 206 | 0.18% | | | |
| Total polled | | 551 | 5,887 | 5,355 | 1,083 | 70,059 | 3,546 | 13,834 | 6,112 | 1,112 | 9,057 | 116,596 | 80.46% | | | |
| Registered electors | | 659 | 7,321 | 6,705 | 1,296 | 86,697 | 4,451 | 17,505 | 7,549 | 1,351 | 11,376 | 144,910 | | | | |
| Turnout | | 83.61% | 80.41% | 79.87% | 83.56% | 80.81% | 79.67% | 79.03% | 80.96% | 82.31% | 79.61% | 80.46% | | | | |

The following candidates were elected:

- Constituency seats - Alf Erik Andersen (FrP); Amalie Gunnufsen (H); Jorunn Gleditsch Lossius (KrF); Kai Steffen Østensen (Ap); and Stian Storbukås (FrP).
- Compensatory seat - Mirell Høyer-Berntsen (SV).

===== 2021 =====
Results of the 2021 parliamentary election held on 13 September 2021:

| Party | | Votes per municipality | | | | | | | | | | Total votes | % | Seats | | |
| Party | | Åseral | Farsund | Flekke- fjord | Hæge- bostad | Kristian- sand | Kvines- dal | Lindes- nes | Lyngdal | Sirdal | Venne- sla | Total votes | % | Con. | Com. | Tot. |
|---|---|---|---|---|---|---|---|---|---|---|---|---|---|---|---|---|
| Conservative Party | H | 67 | 1,197 | 940 | 103 | 14,489 | 446 | 2,693 | 1,141 | 156 | 1,127 | 22,359 | 21.26% | 1 | 0 | 1 |
| Labour Party | Ap | 92 | 1,083 | 776 | 78 | 13,967 | 625 | 2,651 | 763 | 152 | 1,658 | 21,845 | 20.78% | 1 | 0 | 1 |
| Christian Democratic Party | KrF | 81 | 581 | 628 | 277 | 8,097 | 480 | 1,384 | 1,203 | 136 | 1,731 | 14,598 | 13.88% | 1 | 0 | 1 |
| Progress Party | FrP | 64 | 1,129 | 1,205 | 183 | 6,109 | 673 | 2,208 | 988 | 167 | 1,095 | 13,821 | 13.14% | 1 | 0 | 1 |
| Centre Party | Sp | 205 | 680 | 683 | 301 | 4,209 | 665 | 1,749 | 865 | 264 | 1,238 | 10,859 | 10.33% | 1 | 0 | 1 |
| Socialist Left Party | SV | 8 | 207 | 206 | 12 | 4,102 | 86 | 501 | 142 | 24 | 327 | 5,615 | 5.34% | 0 | 0 | 0 |
| Liberal Party | V | 4 | 140 | 101 | 1 | 2,858 | 48 | 419 | 103 | 23 | 137 | 3,834 | 3.65% | 0 | 1 | 1 |
| Red Party | R | 6 | 136 | 137 | 10 | 2,384 | 53 | 319 | 111 | 20 | 179 | 3,355 | 3.19% | 0 | 0 | 0 |
| Green Party | MDG | 1 | 84 | 82 | 6 | 2,530 | 62 | 361 | 72 | 14 | 118 | 3,330 | 3.17% | 0 | 0 | 0 |
| Democrats in Norway | | 8 | 120 | 74 | 22 | 1,844 | 68 | 281 | 86 | 22 | 184 | 2,709 | 2.58% | 0 | 0 | 0 |
| The Christians | PDK | 13 | 66 | 27 | 19 | 451 | 46 | 119 | 75 | 15 | 138 | 969 | 0.92% | 0 | 0 | 0 |
| Pensioners' Party | PP | 1 | 12 | 11 | 0 | 367 | 8 | 55 | 14 | 2 | 22 | 492 | 0.47% | 0 | 0 | 0 |
| Center Party | | 0 | 18 | 10 | 3 | 310 | 14 | 54 | 31 | 2 | 36 | 478 | 0.45% | 0 | 0 | 0 |
| Industry and Business Party | INP | 0 | 36 | 25 | 2 | 120 | 37 | 68 | 40 | 5 | 27 | 360 | 0.34% | 0 | 0 | 0 |
| Health Party | | 2 | 15 | 6 | 1 | 101 | 3 | 22 | 8 | 0 | 9 | 167 | 0.16% | 0 | 0 | 0 |
| Capitalist Party | | 0 | 6 | 7 | 0 | 101 | 8 | 15 | 9 | 2 | 16 | 164 | 0.16% | 0 | 0 | 0 |
| Pirate Party of Norway | | 0 | 2 | 3 | 1 | 54 | 6 | 4 | 1 | 0 | 7 | 78 | 0.07% | 0 | 0 | 0 |
| People's Action No to More Road Tolls | FNB | 0 | 3 | 1 | 0 | 46 | 0 | 7 | 1 | 0 | 4 | 62 | 0.06% | 0 | 0 | 0 |
| Alliance - Alternative for Norway | | 0 | 3 | 3 | 0 | 35 | 2 | 6 | 1 | 0 | 3 | 53 | 0.05% | 0 | 0 | 0 |
| Valid votes | | 552 | 5,518 | 4,925 | 1,019 | 62,174 | 3,330 | 12,916 | 5,654 | 1,004 | 8,056 | 105,148 | 100.00% | 5 | 1 | 6 |
| Blank votes | | 1 | 25 | 32 | 3 | 410 | 24 | 63 | 28 | 5 | 43 | 634 | 0.60% | | | |
| Rejected votes – other | | 0 | 7 | 7 | 0 | 73 | 6 | 31 | 0 | 1 | 3 | 128 | 0.12% | | | |
| Total polled | | 553 | 5,550 | 4,964 | 1,022 | 62,657 | 3,360 | 13,010 | 5,682 | 1,010 | 8,102 | 105,910 | 77.04% | | | |
| Registered electors | | 678 | 7,104 | 6,471 | 1,242 | 81,546 | 4,374 | 16,798 | 7,259 | 1,259 | 10,735 | 137,466 | | | | |
| Turnout | | 81.56% | 78.13% | 76.71% | 82.29% | 76.84% | 76.82% | 77.45% | 78.28% | 80.22% | 75.47% | 77.04% | | | | |

The following candidates were elected:

- Constituency seats - Anja Ninasdotter Abusland (Sp); Ingunn Foss (H); Kari Henriksen (Ap); Kjell Ingolf Ropstad (KrF); and Gisle Meininger Saudland (FrP).
- Compensatory seat - Ingvild Wetrhus Thorsvik (V).

==== 2010s ====
===== 2017 =====
Results of the 2017 parliamentary election held on 11 September 2017:

| Party | | Votes per municipality | | | | | | | | | | | | | | | Total votes | % | Seats | | |
| Party | | Åseral | Audne- dal | Farsund | Flekke- fjord | Hæge- bostad | Kristian- sand | Kvines- dal | Lindes- nes | Lyngdal | Mandal | Marnar- dal | Sirdal | Søgne | Song- dalen | Venne- sla | Total votes | % | Con. | Com. | Tot. |
|---|---|---|---|---|---|---|---|---|---|---|---|---|---|---|---|---|---|---|---|---|---|
| Conservative Party | H | 111 | 166 | 1,501 | 1,153 | 183 | 14,870 | 630 | 787 | 1,324 | 2,515 | 236 | 219 | 2,041 | 764 | 1,646 | 28,146 | 27.88% | 2 | 0 | 2 |
| Labour Party | Ap | 89 | 129 | 1,064 | 865 | 103 | 11,352 | 759 | 398 | 578 | 1,812 | 256 | 170 | 1,173 | 732 | 1,758 | 21,238 | 21.04% | 1 | 0 | 1 |
| Progress Party | FrP | 79 | 180 | 1,295 | 1,215 | 205 | 6,536 | 813 | 545 | 950 | 1,872 | 175 | 177 | 1,051 | 651 | 1,540 | 17,284 | 17.12% | 1 | 0 | 1 |
| Christian Democratic Party | KrF | 85 | 269 | 575 | 612 | 242 | 5,717 | 480 | 358 | 911 | 794 | 114 | 147 | 600 | 420 | 1,423 | 12,747 | 12.63% | 1 | 1 | 2 |
| Centre Party | Sp | 135 | 193 | 337 | 521 | 204 | 1,436 | 404 | 284 | 360 | 486 | 396 | 210 | 542 | 382 | 652 | 6,542 | 6.48% | 0 | 0 | 0 |
| Socialist Left Party | SV | 8 | 18 | 165 | 162 | 5 | 2,810 | 54 | 63 | 89 | 341 | 30 | 19 | 244 | 99 | 226 | 4,333 | 4.29% | 0 | 0 | 0 |
| Liberal Party | V | 5 | 5 | 150 | 124 | 12 | 2,311 | 44 | 81 | 84 | 282 | 34 | 28 | 240 | 82 | 172 | 3,654 | 3.62% | 0 | 0 | 0 |
| Green Party | MDG | 2 | 11 | 76 | 69 | 13 | 1,878 | 54 | 35 | 51 | 260 | 28 | 25 | 218 | 78 | 113 | 2,911 | 2.88% | 0 | 0 | 0 |
| Red Party | R | 2 | 7 | 82 | 50 | 4 | 888 | 34 | 29 | 18 | 93 | 16 | 6 | 54 | 38 | 55 | 1,376 | 1.36% | 0 | 0 | 0 |
| The Christians | PDK | 3 | 14 | 38 | 30 | 30 | 269 | 20 | 36 | 38 | 57 | 11 | 8 | 82 | 27 | 130 | 793 | 0.79% | 0 | 0 | 0 |
| Democrats in Norway | | 1 | 4 | 16 | 20 | 0 | 519 | 7 | 7 | 9 | 31 | 5 | 2 | 26 | 32 | 69 | 748 | 0.74% | 0 | 0 | 0 |
| Pensioners' Party | PP | 2 | 2 | 32 | 10 | 1 | 207 | 9 | 30 | 15 | 49 | 1 | 0 | 24 | 6 | 40 | 428 | 0.42% | 0 | 0 | 0 |
| Health Party | | 2 | 2 | 14 | 13 | 1 | 122 | 4 | 6 | 9 | 22 | 2 | 0 | 14 | 6 | 9 | 226 | 0.22% | 0 | 0 | 0 |
| Capitalist Party | | 1 | 1 | 7 | 8 | 1 | 129 | 6 | 1 | 7 | 13 | 10 | 0 | 9 | 8 | 10 | 211 | 0.21% | 0 | 0 | 0 |
| Pirate Party of Norway | | 0 | 0 | 8 | 6 | 0 | 90 | 3 | 0 | 6 | 8 | 3 | 0 | 7 | 14 | 8 | 153 | 0.15% | 0 | 0 | 0 |
| The Alliance | | 0 | 0 | 7 | 3 | 1 | 43 | 5 | 3 | 5 | 11 | 1 | 4 | 1 | 4 | 11 | 99 | 0.10% | 0 | 0 | 0 |
| Coastal Party | KP | 1 | 2 | 6 | 8 | 2 | 12 | 7 | 4 | 2 | 5 | 1 | 0 | 1 | 11 | 4 | 66 | 0.07% | 0 | 0 | 0 |
| Valid votes | | 526 | 1,003 | 5,373 | 4,869 | 1,007 | 49,189 | 3,333 | 2,667 | 4,456 | 8,651 | 1,319 | 1,015 | 6,327 | 3,354 | 7,866 | 100,955 | 100.00% | 5 | 1 | 6 |
| Blank votes | | 4 | 3 | 33 | 20 | 1 | 259 | 5 | 10 | 11 | 40 | 1 | 4 | 30 | 21 | 35 | 477 | 0.47% | | | |
| Rejected votes – other | | 0 | 1 | 16 | 1 | 0 | 100 | 6 | 12 | 0 | 25 | 1 | 2 | 12 | 4 | 0 | 180 | 0.18% | | | |
| Total polled | | 530 | 1,007 | 5,422 | 4,890 | 1,008 | 49,548 | 3,344 | 2,689 | 4,467 | 8,716 | 1,321 | 1,021 | 6,369 | 3,379 | 7,901 | 101,612 | 77.16% | | | |
| Registered electors | | 661 | 1,227 | 7,028 | 6,512 | 1,229 | 64,351 | 4,249 | 3,456 | 5,721 | 11,327 | 1,668 | 1,275 | 8,146 | 4,508 | 10,326 | 131,684 | | | | |
| Turnout | | 80.18% | 82.07% | 77.15% | 75.09% | 82.02% | 77.00% | 78.70% | 77.81% | 78.08% | 76.95% | 79.20% | 80.08% | 78.19% | 74.96% | 76.52% | 77.16% | | | | |

The following candidates were elected:

- Constituency seats - Norunn Tveiten Benestad (H); Ingunn Foss (H); Hans Fredrik Grøvan (KrF); Kari Henriksen (Ap); and Gisle Meininger Saudland (FrP).
- Compensatory seat - Torhild Bransdal (KrF).

===== 2013 =====
Results of the 2013 parliamentary election held on 8 and 9 September 2013:

| Party | | Votes per municipality | | | | | | | | | | | | | | | Total votes | % | Seats | | |
| Party | | Åseral | Audne- dal | Farsund | Flekke- fjord | Hæge- bostad | Kristian- sand | Kvines- dal | Lindes- nes | Lyngdal | Mandal | Marnar- dal | Sirdal | Søgne | Song- dalen | Venne- sla | Total votes | % | Con. | Com. | Tot. |
|---|---|---|---|---|---|---|---|---|---|---|---|---|---|---|---|---|---|---|---|---|---|
| Conservative Party | H | 77 | 160 | 1,377 | 1,417 | 159 | 13,936 | 705 | 688 | 1,224 | 2,366 | 240 | 229 | 1,956 | 756 | 1,528 | 26,818 | 27.47% | 2 | 0 | 2 |
| Labour Party | Ap | 110 | 191 | 1,165 | 1,145 | 150 | 11,717 | 824 | 455 | 682 | 2,061 | 344 | 189 | 1,291 | 826 | 2,077 | 23,227 | 23.79% | 1 | 1 | 2 |
| Progress Party | FrP | 73 | 153 | 1,225 | 1,083 | 184 | 7,450 | 746 | 538 | 797 | 1,892 | 194 | 153 | 1,184 | 692 | 1,499 | 17,863 | 18.29% | 1 | 0 | 1 |
| Christian Democratic Party | KrF | 93 | 290 | 653 | 676 | 243 | 5,983 | 456 | 403 | 936 | 809 | 146 | 181 | 707 | 451 | 1,509 | 13,536 | 13.86% | 1 | 0 | 1 |
| Liberal Party | V | 9 | 12 | 185 | 195 | 11 | 2,517 | 56 | 129 | 104 | 355 | 39 | 37 | 291 | 106 | 159 | 4,205 | 4.31% | 0 | 0 | 0 |
| Centre Party | Sp | 97 | 131 | 203 | 216 | 126 | 459 | 191 | 139 | 222 | 209 | 180 | 159 | 121 | 231 | 278 | 2,962 | 3.03% | 0 | 0 | 0 |
| Socialist Left Party | SV | 5 | 8 | 133 | 118 | 2 | 1,535 | 43 | 39 | 71 | 236 | 23 | 14 | 169 | 57 | 115 | 2,568 | 2.63% | 0 | 0 | 0 |
| Green Party | MDG | 2 | 7 | 70 | 68 | 11 | 1,425 | 37 | 32 | 29 | 209 | 25 | 20 | 125 | 46 | 90 | 2,196 | 2.25% | 0 | 0 | 0 |
| The Christians | PDK | 14 | 45 | 105 | 86 | 90 | 594 | 74 | 93 | 139 | 195 | 37 | 26 | 99 | 74 | 304 | 1,975 | 2.02% | 0 | 0 | 0 |
| Pensioners' Party | PP | 4 | 3 | 49 | 14 | 3 | 556 | 6 | 33 | 22 | 63 | 6 | 1 | 48 | 24 | 49 | 881 | 0.90% | 0 | 0 | 0 |
| Democrats in Norway | | 1 | 0 | 6 | 5 | 0 | 398 | 5 | 5 | 3 | 11 | 3 | 1 | 18 | 23 | 37 | 516 | 0.53% | 0 | 0 | 0 |
| Red Party | R | 1 | 1 | 9 | 30 | 0 | 271 | 18 | 10 | 6 | 32 | 4 | 1 | 32 | 14 | 31 | 460 | 0.47% | 0 | 0 | 0 |
| Pirate Party of Norway | | 0 | 1 | 8 | 15 | 1 | 161 | 10 | 5 | 10 | 16 | 3 | 1 | 18 | 9 | 26 | 284 | 0.29% | 0 | 0 | 0 |
| Liberal People's Party | DLF | 0 | 0 | 1 | 7 | 0 | 20 | 1 | 1 | 0 | 3 | 9 | 1 | 1 | 4 | 17 | 65 | 0.07% | 0 | 0 | 0 |
| Coastal Party | KP | 1 | 0 | 8 | 3 | 0 | 8 | 2 | 1 | 2 | 6 | 3 | 0 | 2 | 1 | 6 | 43 | 0.04% | 0 | 0 | 0 |
| Communist Party of Norway | K | 0 | 2 | 5 | 1 | 0 | 20 | 0 | 1 | 1 | 0 | 1 | 0 | 1 | 1 | 8 | 41 | 0.04% | 0 | 0 | 0 |
| Valid votes | | 487 | 1,004 | 5,202 | 5,079 | 980 | 47,050 | 3,174 | 2,572 | 4,248 | 8,463 | 1,257 | 1,013 | 6,063 | 3,315 | 7,733 | 97,640 | 100.00% | 5 | 1 | 6 |
| Blank votes | | 1 | 1 | 25 | 18 | 2 | 175 | 22 | 7 | 8 | 28 | 8 | 1 | 7 | 12 | 29 | 344 | 0.35% | | | |
| Rejected votes – other | | 0 | 3 | 10 | 7 | 1 | 76 | 18 | 18 | 3 | 10 | 3 | 1 | 7 | 5 | 1 | 163 | 0.17% | | | |
| Total polled | | 488 | 1,008 | 5,237 | 5,104 | 983 | 47,301 | 3,214 | 2,597 | 4,259 | 8,501 | 1,268 | 1,015 | 6,077 | 3,332 | 7,763 | 98,147 | 77.70% | | | |
| Registered electors | | 623 | 1,205 | 6,891 | 6,560 | 1,205 | 60,894 | 4,196 | 3,372 | 5,462 | 10,978 | 1,611 | 1,279 | 7,758 | 4,342 | 9,941 | 126,317 | | | | |
| Turnout | | 78.33% | 83.65% | 76.00% | 77.80% | 81.58% | 77.68% | 76.60% | 77.02% | 77.98% | 77.44% | 78.71% | 79.36% | 78.33% | 76.74% | 78.09% | 77.70% | | | | |

The following candidates were elected:

- Constituency seats - Norunn Tveiten Benestad (H); Ingunn Foss (H); Hans Fredrik Grøvan (KrF); Kari Henriksen (Ap); and Åse Michaelsen (FrP).
- Compensatory seat - Odd Omland (Ap).

==== 2000s ====
===== 2009 =====
Results of the 2009 parliamentary election held on 13 and 14 September 2009:

| Party | | Votes per municipality | | | | | | | | | | | | | | | Total votes | % | Seats | | |
| Party | | Åseral | Audne- dal | Farsund | Flekke- fjord | Hæge- bostad | Kristian- sand | Kvines- dal | Lindes- nes | Lyngdal | Mandal | Marnar- dal | Sirdal | Søgne | Song- dalen | Venne- sla | Total votes | % | Con. | Com. | Tot. |
|---|---|---|---|---|---|---|---|---|---|---|---|---|---|---|---|---|---|---|---|---|---|
| Progress Party | FrP | 120 | 235 | 2,094 | 1,472 | 271 | 10,437 | 932 | 807 | 1,243 | 2,511 | 275 | 214 | 1,677 | 954 | 2,054 | 25,296 | 27.38% | 2 | 0 | 2 |
| Labour Party | Ap | 101 | 162 | 1,226 | 1,256 | 133 | 12,433 | 889 | 514 | 707 | 2,179 | 337 | 204 | 1,425 | 799 | 2,085 | 24,450 | 26.47% | 1 | 0 | 1 |
| Conservative Party | H | 43 | 81 | 777 | 821 | 98 | 8,913 | 337 | 443 | 719 | 1,404 | 133 | 112 | 1,171 | 398 | 764 | 16,214 | 17.55% | 1 | 0 | 1 |
| Christian Democratic Party | KrF | 109 | 303 | 613 | 679 | 283 | 6,313 | 495 | 446 | 1,016 | 949 | 147 | 209 | 694 | 464 | 1,617 | 14,337 | 15.52% | 1 | 0 | 1 |
| Socialist Left Party | SV | 12 | 9 | 169 | 137 | 8 | 2,280 | 54 | 57 | 90 | 325 | 26 | 32 | 215 | 86 | 147 | 3,647 | 3.95% | 0 | 1 | 1 |
| Centre Party | Sp | 73 | 142 | 208 | 279 | 114 | 569 | 255 | 165 | 199 | 261 | 220 | 158 | 145 | 232 | 276 | 3,296 | 3.57% | 0 | 0 | 0 |
| Liberal Party | V | 7 | 10 | 92 | 230 | 9 | 1,512 | 66 | 85 | 102 | 300 | 43 | 47 | 207 | 66 | 100 | 2,876 | 3.11% | 0 | 0 | 0 |
| Pensioners' Party | PP | 2 | 1 | 16 | 15 | 5 | 455 | 7 | 5 | 7 | 19 | 4 | 1 | 34 | 11 | 41 | 623 | 0.67% | 0 | 0 | 0 |
| Democrats in Norway | | 1 | 1 | 5 | 7 | 0 | 360 | 3 | 6 | 2 | 6 | 2 | 0 | 7 | 30 | 31 | 461 | 0.50% | 0 | 0 | 0 |
| Red Party | R | 0 | 3 | 13 | 17 | 0 | 276 | 10 | 5 | 4 | 38 | 2 | 4 | 27 | 8 | 20 | 427 | 0.46% | 0 | 0 | 0 |
| Green Party | MDG | 0 | 0 | 8 | 8 | 2 | 226 | 3 | 8 | 4 | 18 | 4 | 8 | 12 | 5 | 16 | 322 | 0.35% | 0 | 0 | 0 |
| Christian Unity Party | KSP | 4 | 9 | 20 | 17 | 6 | 104 | 13 | 11 | 9 | 24 | 5 | 2 | 23 | 14 | 56 | 317 | 0.34% | 0 | 0 | 0 |
| Coastal Party | KP | 1 | 1 | 8 | 6 | 0 | 20 | 3 | 2 | 4 | 9 | 0 | 1 | 7 | 1 | 15 | 78 | 0.08% | 0 | 0 | 0 |
| Communist Party of Norway | K | 0 | 0 | 6 | 1 | 0 | 17 | 2 | 1 | 1 | 3 | 1 | 0 | 0 | 0 | 2 | 34 | 0.04% | 0 | 0 | 0 |
| Valid votes | | 473 | 957 | 5,255 | 4,945 | 929 | 43,915 | 3,069 | 2,555 | 4,107 | 8,046 | 1,199 | 992 | 5,644 | 3,068 | 7,224 | 92,378 | 100.00% | 5 | 1 | 6 |
| Blank votes | | 3 | 1 | 19 | 21 | 3 | 146 | 10 | 10 | 11 | 35 | 3 | 6 | 6 | 14 | 25 | 313 | 0.34% | | | |
| Rejected votes – other | | 0 | 0 | 1 | 0 | 0 | 44 | 2 | 0 | 1 | 28 | 0 | 0 | 3 | 2 | 9 | 90 | 0.10% | | | |
| Total polled | | 476 | 958 | 5,275 | 4,966 | 932 | 44,105 | 3,081 | 2,565 | 4,119 | 8,109 | 1,202 | 998 | 5,653 | 3,084 | 7,258 | 92,781 | 76.20% | | | |
| Registered electors | | 620 | 1,171 | 6,788 | 6,602 | 1,159 | 58,336 | 4,130 | 3,308 | 5,261 | 10,652 | 1,563 | 1,282 | 7,353 | 4,100 | 9,429 | 121,754 | | | | |
| Turnout | | 76.77% | 81.81% | 77.71% | 75.22% | 80.41% | 75.61% | 74.60% | 77.54% | 78.29% | 76.13% | 76.90% | 77.85% | 76.88% | 75.22% | 76.98% | 76.20% | | | | |

The following candidates were elected:

- Constituency seats - Dagrun Eriksen (KrF); Peter Skovholt Gitmark (H); Kari Henriksen (Ap); Åse Michaelsen (FrP); and Henning Skumsvoll (FrP).
- Compensatory seat - Alf Egil Holmelid (SV).

===== 2005 =====
Results of the 2005 parliamentary election held on 11 and 12 September 2005:

| Party | | Votes per municipality | | | | | | | | | | | | | | | Total votes | % | Seats | | |
| Party | | Åseral | Audne- dal | Farsund | Flekke- fjord | Hæge- bostad | Kristian- sand | Kvines- dal | Lindes- nes | Lyngdal | Mandal | Marnar- dal | Sirdal | Søgne | Song- dalen | Venne- sla | Total votes | % | Con. | Com. | Tot. |
|---|---|---|---|---|---|---|---|---|---|---|---|---|---|---|---|---|---|---|---|---|---|
| Progress Party | FrP | 115 | 180 | 1,999 | 1,206 | 204 | 9,003 | 924 | 659 | 1,076 | 2,053 | 212 | 179 | 1,271 | 834 | 1,694 | 21,609 | 23.95% | 2 | 0 | 2 |
| Labour Party | Ap | 87 | 154 | 1,057 | 1,181 | 134 | 10,881 | 752 | 505 | 646 | 1,895 | 285 | 170 | 1,193 | 732 | 1,918 | 21,590 | 23.93% | 1 | 0 | 1 |
| Christian Democratic Party | KrF | 139 | 336 | 785 | 869 | 306 | 7,604 | 609 | 532 | 1,017 | 1,165 | 171 | 212 | 830 | 561 | 1,921 | 17,057 | 18.91% | 1 | 0 | 1 |
| Conservative Party | H | 29 | 55 | 611 | 697 | 75 | 7,519 | 303 | 336 | 550 | 1,155 | 112 | 90 | 949 | 279 | 506 | 13,266 | 14.70% | 1 | 0 | 1 |
| Socialist Left Party | SV | 15 | 22 | 268 | 258 | 9 | 3,550 | 124 | 122 | 158 | 528 | 55 | 45 | 295 | 138 | 297 | 5,884 | 6.52% | 0 | 0 | 0 |
| Liberal Party | V | 17 | 35 | 233 | 411 | 21 | 2,367 | 131 | 135 | 183 | 520 | 81 | 85 | 338 | 118 | 216 | 4,891 | 5.42% | 0 | 1 | 1 |
| Centre Party | Sp | 77 | 140 | 246 | 277 | 145 | 790 | 231 | 181 | 230 | 314 | 216 | 182 | 204 | 274 | 305 | 3,812 | 4.23% | 0 | 0 | 0 |
| Pensioners' Party | PP | 2 | 1 | 13 | 4 | 0 | 324 | 9 | 1 | 9 | 20 | 5 | 4 | 28 | 9 | 23 | 452 | 0.50% | 0 | 0 | 0 |
| Red Electoral Alliance | RV | 0 | 0 | 12 | 10 | 1 | 213 | 9 | 5 | 9 | 16 | 2 | 1 | 19 | 8 | 12 | 317 | 0.35% | 0 | 0 | 0 |
| Democrats | | 1 | 0 | 5 | 14 | 0 | 223 | 4 | 12 | 5 | 11 | 1 | 0 | 10 | 17 | 9 | 312 | 0.35% | 0 | 0 | 0 |
| Christian Unity Party | KSP | 1 | 6 | 18 | 14 | 2 | 121 | 14 | 14 | 9 | 14 | 4 | 4 | 11 | 6 | 32 | 270 | 0.30% | 0 | 0 | 0 |
| Coastal Party | KP | 2 | 3 | 35 | 46 | 3 | 79 | 9 | 4 | 7 | 18 | 4 | 2 | 18 | 8 | 21 | 259 | 0.29% | 0 | 0 | 0 |
| Green Party | MDG | 1 | 1 | 3 | 3 | 2 | 161 | 3 | 5 | 1 | 9 | 1 | 1 | 9 | 4 | 10 | 214 | 0.24% | 0 | 0 | 0 |
| Abortion Opponents' List | | 1 | 9 | 10 | 11 | 7 | 50 | 14 | 4 | 4 | 22 | 1 | 3 | 7 | 5 | 27 | 175 | 0.19% | 0 | 0 | 0 |
| Beer Unity Party | | 0 | 0 | 1 | 2 | 0 | 39 | 2 | 2 | 4 | 7 | 1 | 2 | 1 | 0 | 4 | 65 | 0.07% | 0 | 0 | 0 |
| Communist Party of Norway | K | 0 | 0 | 6 | 1 | 0 | 22 | 1 | 0 | 1 | 6 | 1 | 1 | 4 | 1 | 2 | 46 | 0.05% | 0 | 0 | 0 |
| Valid votes | | 487 | 942 | 5,302 | 5,004 | 909 | 42,946 | 3,139 | 2,517 | 3,909 | 7,753 | 1,152 | 981 | 5,187 | 2,994 | 6,997 | 90,219 | 100.00% | 5 | 1 | 6 |
| Blank votes | | 2 | 2 | 12 | 17 | 0 | 102 | 6 | 9 | 10 | 23 | 0 | 3 | 16 | 5 | 25 | 232 | 0.26% | | | |
| Rejected votes – other | | 4 | 0 | 4 | 0 | 0 | 17 | 1 | 1 | 1 | 6 | 0 | 3 | 2 | 2 | 3 | 44 | 0.05% | | | |
| Total polled | | 493 | 944 | 5,318 | 5,021 | 909 | 43,065 | 3,146 | 2,527 | 3,920 | 7,782 | 1,152 | 987 | 5,205 | 3,001 | 7,025 | 90,495 | 77.24% | | | |
| Registered electors | | 635 | 1,142 | 6,838 | 6,585 | 1,161 | 55,672 | 4,046 | 3,250 | 5,061 | 10,323 | 1,544 | 1,290 | 6,801 | 3,866 | 8,944 | 117,158 | | | | |
| Turnout | | 77.64% | 82.66% | 77.77% | 76.25% | 78.29% | 77.35% | 77.76% | 77.75% | 77.46% | 75.39% | 74.61% | 76.51% | 76.53% | 77.63% | 78.54% | 77.24% | | | | |

The following candidates were elected:

- Constituency seats - Peter Skovholt Gitmark (H); Rolf Terje Klungland (Ap); Jon Lilletun (KrF); Åse Michaelsen (FrP); and Henning Skumsvoll (FrP).
- Compensatory seat - Anne Margrethe Larsen (V).

===== 2001 =====
Results of the 2001 parliamentary election held on 9 and 10 September 2001:

| Party | | Votes per municipality | | | | | | | | | | | | | | | Total votes | % | Seats | | |
| Party | | Åseral | Audne- dal | Farsund | Flekke- fjord | Hæge- bostad | Kristian- sand | Kvines- dal | Lindes- nes | Lyngdal | Mandal | Marnar- dal | Sirdal | Søgne | Song- dalen | Venne- sla | Total votes | % | Con. | Com. | Tot. |
|---|---|---|---|---|---|---|---|---|---|---|---|---|---|---|---|---|---|---|---|---|---|
| Christian Democratic Party | KrF | 222 | 406 | 1,117 | 1,250 | 394 | 9,501 | 827 | 679 | 1,272 | 1,649 | 335 | 287 | 1,181 | 823 | 2,429 | 22,372 | 26.17% | 2 | 0 | 2 |
| Conservative Party | H | 49 | 91 | 1,434 | 1,062 | 116 | 10,374 | 533 | 582 | 846 | 1,836 | 157 | 161 | 1,323 | 491 | 758 | 19,813 | 23.18% | 2 | 0 | 2 |
| Labour Party | Ap | 62 | 126 | 730 | 870 | 98 | 6,900 | 509 | 352 | 475 | 1,175 | 209 | 160 | 745 | 542 | 1,350 | 14,303 | 16.73% | 1 | 0 | 1 |
| Progress Party | FrP | 55 | 77 | 793 | 564 | 90 | 3,605 | 478 | 273 | 502 | 999 | 99 | 101 | 508 | 319 | 710 | 9,173 | 10.73% | 0 | 0 | 0 |
| Socialist Left Party | SV | 29 | 51 | 396 | 345 | 43 | 5,109 | 193 | 156 | 208 | 817 | 99 | 57 | 560 | 268 | 593 | 8,924 | 10.44% | 0 | 0 | 0 |
| Centre Party | Sp | 59 | 114 | 177 | 214 | 128 | 568 | 206 | 155 | 207 | 273 | 201 | 155 | 152 | 202 | 286 | 3,097 | 3.62% | 0 | 0 | 0 |
| Liberal Party | V | 6 | 11 | 157 | 218 | 10 | 1,412 | 111 | 98 | 114 | 315 | 60 | 53 | 197 | 81 | 158 | 3,001 | 3.51% | 0 | 0 | 0 |
| County Lists | | 16 | 11 | 98 | 120 | 20 | 1,425 | 67 | 36 | 55 | 106 | 21 | 7 | 110 | 100 | 215 | 2,407 | 2.82% | 0 | 0 | 0 |
| Coastal Party | KP | 2 | 4 | 96 | 130 | 9 | 187 | 42 | 29 | 32 | 48 | 8 | 11 | 39 | 14 | 31 | 682 | 0.80% | 0 | 0 | 0 |
| The Political Party | DPP | 0 | 5 | 24 | 19 | 0 | 306 | 13 | 23 | 22 | 53 | 6 | 3 | 45 | 13 | 36 | 568 | 0.66% | 0 | 0 | 0 |
| Christian Unity Party | KSP | 4 | 13 | 28 | 21 | 9 | 178 | 27 | 12 | 24 | 24 | 2 | 10 | 18 | 17 | 45 | 432 | 0.51% | 0 | 0 | 0 |
| Red Electoral Alliance | RV | 0 | 1 | 16 | 13 | 1 | 203 | 6 | 7 | 11 | 43 | 1 | 1 | 11 | 3 | 12 | 329 | 0.38% | 0 | 0 | 0 |
| Green Party | MDG | 0 | 0 | 5 | 4 | 0 | 138 | 2 | 6 | 5 | 6 | 2 | 1 | 8 | 6 | 13 | 196 | 0.23% | 0 | 0 | 0 |
| Norwegian People's Party | NFP | 1 | 1 | 10 | 5 | 0 | 30 | 3 | 1 | 4 | 7 | 2 | 0 | 5 | 0 | 3 | 72 | 0.08% | 0 | 0 | 0 |
| Fatherland Party | FLP | 0 | 1 | 4 | 4 | 0 | 23 | 3 | 1 | 1 | 6 | 1 | 0 | 4 | 0 | 5 | 53 | 0.06% | 0 | 0 | 0 |
| Communist Party of Norway | K | 0 | 0 | 3 | 3 | 0 | 27 | 0 | 0 | 1 | 2 | 1 | 0 | 1 | 0 | 3 | 41 | 0.05% | 0 | 0 | 0 |
| Liberal People's Party | DLF | 0 | 0 | 0 | 0 | 1 | 8 | 1 | 1 | 0 | 2 | 0 | 0 | 1 | 0 | 0 | 14 | 0.02% | 0 | 0 | 0 |
| Valid votes | | 505 | 912 | 5,088 | 4,842 | 919 | 39,994 | 3,021 | 2,411 | 3,779 | 7,361 | 1,204 | 1,007 | 4,908 | 2,879 | 6,647 | 85,477 | 100.00% | 5 | 0 | 5 |
| Rejected votes | | 0 | 4 | 28 | 9 | 4 | 148 | 21 | 6 | 10 | 27 | 8 | 1 | 22 | 7 | 28 | 323 | 0.38% | | | |
| Total polled | | 505 | 916 | 5,116 | 4,851 | 923 | 40,142 | 3,042 | 2,417 | 3,789 | 7,388 | 1,212 | 1,008 | 4,930 | 2,886 | 6,675 | 85,800 | 75.28% | | | |
| Registered electors | | 628 | 1,133 | 6,866 | 6,569 | 1,174 | 53,692 | 4,015 | 3,192 | 4,998 | 9,867 | 1,575 | 1,302 | 6,471 | 3,792 | 8,693 | 113,967 | | | | |
| Turnout | | 80.41% | 80.85% | 74.51% | 73.85% | 78.62% | 74.76% | 75.77% | 75.72% | 75.81% | 74.88% | 76.95% | 77.42% | 76.19% | 76.11% | 76.79% | 75.28% | | | | |

The following candidates were elected:

- Constituency seats - Anne Berit Andersen (H); Dagrun Eriksen (KrF); Ansgar Gabrielsen (H); Rolf Terje Klungland (Ap); and Jon Lilletun (KrF).

==== 1990s ====
===== 1997 =====
Results of the 1997 parliamentary election held on 15 September 1997:

| Party | | Votes per municipality | | | | | | | | | | | | | | | Total votes | % | Seats | | |
| Party | | Åseral | Audne- dal | Farsund | Flekke- fjord | Hæge- bostad | Kristian- sand | Kvines- dal | Lindes- nes | Lyngdal | Mandal | Marnar- dal | Sirdal | Søgne | Song- dalen | Venne- sla | Total votes | % | Con. | Com. | Tot. |
|---|---|---|---|---|---|---|---|---|---|---|---|---|---|---|---|---|---|---|---|---|---|
| Christian Democratic Party | KrF | 174 | 402 | 1,053 | 1,281 | 357 | 9,704 | 914 | 671 | 1,285 | 1,817 | 318 | 297 | 1,241 | 864 | 2,448 | 22,826 | 26.26% | 2 | 0 | 2 |
| Labour Party | Ap | 90 | 160 | 1,158 | 1,332 | 162 | 11,214 | 761 | 503 | 737 | 1,940 | 342 | 217 | 1,156 | 770 | 2,227 | 22,769 | 26.20% | 1 | 0 | 1 |
| Progress Party | FrP | 55 | 91 | 1,455 | 872 | 80 | 7,451 | 511 | 392 | 661 | 1,239 | 140 | 119 | 783 | 496 | 1,002 | 15,347 | 17.66% | 1 | 0 | 1 |
| Conservative Party | H | 30 | 60 | 753 | 728 | 84 | 6,252 | 321 | 349 | 506 | 1,126 | 97 | 93 | 746 | 292 | 376 | 11,813 | 13.59% | 1 | 0 | 1 |
| Centre Party | Sp | 140 | 198 | 407 | 447 | 252 | 1,161 | 447 | 295 | 425 | 562 | 289 | 263 | 288 | 350 | 496 | 6,020 | 6.93% | 0 | 0 | 0 |
| Liberal Party | V | 8 | 12 | 168 | 219 | 13 | 1,740 | 95 | 137 | 150 | 348 | 55 | 64 | 227 | 88 | 157 | 3,481 | 4.01% | 0 | 0 | 0 |
| Socialist Left Party | SV | 4 | 17 | 136 | 132 | 5 | 1,761 | 75 | 65 | 49 | 325 | 31 | 20 | 165 | 85 | 144 | 3,014 | 3.47% | 0 | 0 | 0 |
| Red Electoral Alliance | RV | 3 | 1 | 14 | 21 | 3 | 389 | 19 | 17 | 14 | 61 | 2 | 5 | 34 | 17 | 22 | 622 | 0.72% | 0 | 0 | 0 |
| Pensioners' Party | PP | 2 | 2 | 25 | 13 | 3 | 350 | 10 | 9 | 10 | 55 | 3 | 3 | 16 | 17 | 47 | 565 | 0.65% | 0 | 0 | 0 |
| Green Party | MDG | 0 | 3 | 7 | 2 | 1 | 146 | 4 | 3 | 2 | 6 | 0 | 0 | 9 | 6 | 8 | 197 | 0.23% | 0 | 0 | 0 |
| Fatherland Party | FLP | 1 | 1 | 16 | 11 | 1 | 64 | 9 | 8 | 6 | 9 | 2 | 0 | 8 | 4 | 9 | 149 | 0.17% | 0 | 0 | 0 |
| Natural Law Party | | 1 | 0 | 6 | 2 | 0 | 22 | 2 | 3 | 4 | 16 | 0 | 0 | 2 | 2 | 4 | 64 | 0.07% | 0 | 0 | 0 |
| Communist Party of Norway | K | 0 | 0 | 1 | 2 | 0 | 28 | 5 | 0 | 1 | 3 | 0 | 2 | 2 | 1 | 1 | 46 | 0.05% | 0 | 0 | 0 |
| Valid votes | | 508 | 947 | 5,199 | 5,062 | 961 | 40,282 | 3,173 | 2,452 | 3,850 | 7,507 | 1,279 | 1,083 | 4,677 | 2,992 | 6,941 | 86,913 | 100.00% | 5 | 0 | 5 |
| Rejected votes | | 0 | 4 | 13 | 8 | 3 | 124 | 4 | 4 | 7 | 23 | 8 | 3 | 17 | 6 | 8 | 232 | 0.27% | | | |
| Total polled | | 508 | 951 | 5,212 | 5,070 | 964 | 40,406 | 3,177 | 2,456 | 3,857 | 7,530 | 1,287 | 1,086 | 4,694 | 2,998 | 6,949 | 87,145 | 78.82% | | | |
| Registered electors | | 634 | 1,144 | 6,773 | 6,603 | 1,157 | 51,473 | 4,111 | 3,058 | 4,924 | 9,650 | 1,609 | 1,325 | 5,940 | 3,701 | 8,457 | 110,559 | | | | |
| Turnout | | 80.13% | 83.13% | 76.95% | 76.78% | 83.32% | 78.50% | 77.28% | 80.31% | 78.33% | 78.03% | 79.99% | 81.96% | 79.02% | 81.01% | 82.17% | 78.82% | | | | |

The following candidates were elected:

- Constituency seats - Aud Blattmann (Ap); Ansgar Gabrielsen (H); Vidar Kleppe (FrP); Jon Lilletun (KrF); and Anne Brit Stråtveit (KrF).

===== 1993 =====
Results of the 1993 parliamentary election held on 12 and 13 September 1993:

| Party | | Votes per municipality | | | | | | | | | | | | | | | Total votes | % | Seats | | |
| Party | | Åseral | Audne- dal | Farsund | Flekke- fjord | Hæge- bostad | Kristian- sand | Kvines- dal | Lindes- nes | Lyngdal | Mandal | Marnar- dal | Sirdal | Søgne | Song- dalen | Venne- sla | Total votes | % | Con. | Com. | Tot. |
|---|---|---|---|---|---|---|---|---|---|---|---|---|---|---|---|---|---|---|---|---|---|
| Labour Party | Ap | 88 | 158 | 999 | 1,306 | 147 | 11,340 | 812 | 523 | 727 | 1,948 | 310 | 179 | 1,166 | 811 | 2,271 | 22,785 | 27.83% | 2 | 0 | 2 |
| Christian Democratic Party | KrF | 123 | 260 | 905 | 882 | 241 | 6,793 | 697 | 497 | 970 | 1,079 | 188 | 203 | 709 | 533 | 1,840 | 15,920 | 19.44% | 1 | 0 | 1 |
| Centre Party | Sp | 240 | 382 | 1,006 | 992 | 425 | 3,471 | 767 | 616 | 879 | 1,294 | 490 | 428 | 723 | 693 | 1,005 | 13,411 | 16.38% | 1 | 0 | 1 |
| Conservative Party | H | 43 | 64 | 361 | 882 | 66 | 7,594 | 349 | 392 | 414 | 1,238 | 121 | 104 | 817 | 324 | 395 | 13,164 | 16.08% | 1 | 0 | 1 |
| Progress Party | FrP | 13 | 38 | 382 | 384 | 16 | 2,706 | 229 | 112 | 199 | 543 | 50 | 33 | 282 | 190 | 376 | 5,553 | 6.78% | 0 | 0 | 0 |
| Socialist Left Party | SV | 12 | 28 | 132 | 188 | 17 | 2,088 | 135 | 86 | 93 | 461 | 40 | 35 | 191 | 116 | 301 | 3,923 | 4.79% | 0 | 0 | 0 |
| Liberal Party | V | 5 | 4 | 197 | 248 | 5 | 1,261 | 79 | 131 | 128 | 284 | 48 | 67 | 189 | 75 | 132 | 2,853 | 3.48% | 0 | 0 | 0 |
| Pensioners' Party | PP | 7 | 16 | 167 | 46 | 13 | 1,670 | 38 | 34 | 72 | 213 | 10 | 1 | 68 | 47 | 230 | 2,632 | 3.21% | 0 | 0 | 0 |
| New Future Coalition Party | SNF | 4 | 7 | 34 | 15 | 3 | 209 | 27 | 13 | 29 | 26 | 5 | 2 | 45 | 42 | 62 | 523 | 0.64% | 0 | 0 | 0 |
| Fatherland Party | FLP | 0 | 0 | 6 | 21 | 1 | 161 | 17 | 8 | 7 | 15 | 4 | 1 | 18 | 13 | 34 | 306 | 0.37% | 0 | 0 | 0 |
| Red Electoral Alliance | RV | 0 | 0 | 10 | 3 | 1 | 170 | 6 | 9 | 2 | 28 | 1 | 3 | 13 | 4 | 4 | 254 | 0.31% | 0 | 0 | 0 |
| Christian Coalition Party | | 2 | 4 | 16 | 9 | 2 | 86 | 9 | 7 | 11 | 0 | 4 | 0 | 15 | 9 | 16 | 190 | 0.23% | 0 | 0 | 0 |
| Christian Conservative Party | KKP | 4 | 0 | 23 | 12 | 1 | 59 | 12 | 4 | 10 | 8 | 1 | 3 | 7 | 3 | 11 | 158 | 0.19% | 0 | 0 | 0 |
| Green Party | MDG | 0 | 0 | 7 | 1 | 1 | 88 | 0 | 2 | 0 | 7 | 2 | 0 | 8 | 5 | 5 | 126 | 0.15% | 0 | 0 | 0 |
| Natural Law Party | | 0 | 0 | 9 | 3 | 0 | 36 | 1 | 2 | 1 | 19 | 1 | 0 | 1 | 1 | 3 | 77 | 0.09% | 0 | 0 | 0 |
| Valid votes | | 541 | 961 | 4,254 | 4,992 | 939 | 37,732 | 3,178 | 2,436 | 3,542 | 7,163 | 1,275 | 1,059 | 4,252 | 2,866 | 6,685 | 81,875 | 100.00% | 5 | 0 | 5 |
| Rejected votes | | 1 | 2 | 212 | 10 | 1 | 86 | 3 | 1 | 33 | 25 | 2 | 0 | 10 | 6 | 9 | 401 | 0.49% | | | |
| Total polled | | 542 | 963 | 4,466 | 5,002 | 940 | 37,818 | 3,181 | 2,437 | 3,575 | 7,188 | 1,277 | 1,059 | 4,262 | 2,872 | 6,694 | 82,276 | 76.41% | | | |
| Registered electors | | 656 | 1,158 | 6,800 | 6,586 | 1,140 | 49,508 | 4,188 | 3,002 | 4,658 | 9,424 | 1,590 | 1,310 | 5,616 | 3,654 | 8,391 | 107,681 | | | | |
| Turnout | | 82.62% | 83.16% | 65.68% | 75.95% | 82.46% | 76.39% | 75.96% | 81.18% | 76.75% | 76.27% | 80.31% | 80.84% | 75.89% | 78.60% | 79.78% | 76.41% | | | | |

The following candidates were elected:

- Constituency seats - Aud Blattmann (Ap); Ansgar Gabrielsen (H); Rolf Terje Klungland (Ap); Jon Lilletun (KrF); and Sigurd Manneråk (Sp).

==== 1980s ====
===== 1989 =====
Results of the 1989 parliamentary election held on 10 and 11 September 1989:

| Party | | Votes per municipality | | | | | | | | | | | | | | | Total votes | % | Seats | | |
| Party | | Åseral | Audne- dal | Farsund | Flekke- fjord | Hæge- bostad | Kristian- sand | Kvines- dal | Lindes- nes | Lyngdal | Mandal | Marnar- dal | Sirdal | Søgne | Song- dalen | Venne- sla | Total votes | % | Con. | Com. | Tot. |
|---|---|---|---|---|---|---|---|---|---|---|---|---|---|---|---|---|---|---|---|---|---|
| Labour Party | Ap | 109 | 217 | 1,165 | 1,315 | 226 | 9,534 | 834 | 529 | 692 | 1,753 | 324 | 236 | 926 | 751 | 2,342 | 20,953 | 23.72% | 2 | 0 | 2 |
| Conservative Party | H | 92 | 116 | 1,547 | 1,358 | 108 | 10,212 | 584 | 515 | 870 | 1,609 | 210 | 208 | 1,170 | 506 | 709 | 19,814 | 22.43% | 1 | 0 | 1 |
| Christian Democratic Party | KrF | 136 | 331 | 1,031 | 1,143 | 330 | 6,887 | 787 | 552 | 1,011 | 1,231 | 225 | 261 | 730 | 687 | 1,844 | 17,186 | 19.45% | 1 | 0 | 1 |
| Progress Party | FrP | 70 | 137 | 1,149 | 925 | 92 | 7,404 | 631 | 390 | 598 | 1,375 | 234 | 70 | 868 | 562 | 1,180 | 15,685 | 17.76% | 1 | 0 | 1 |
| Socialist Left Party | SV | 10 | 26 | 209 | 234 | 14 | 2,630 | 139 | 90 | 135 | 546 | 39 | 40 | 183 | 144 | 385 | 4,824 | 5.46% | 0 | 0 | 0 |
| Centre Party | Sp | 124 | 165 | 260 | 222 | 150 | 569 | 185 | 223 | 278 | 392 | 259 | 190 | 171 | 273 | 313 | 3,774 | 4.27% | 0 | 0 | 0 |
| Liberal Party | V | 6 | 8 | 226 | 254 | 15 | 1,613 | 117 | 121 | 157 | 514 | 69 | 63 | 223 | 128 | 178 | 3,692 | 4.18% | 0 | 0 | 0 |
| Pensioners' Party | PP | 6 | 16 | 57 | 49 | 15 | 1,065 | 44 | 20 | 29 | 170 | 10 | 2 | 53 | 21 | 98 | 1,655 | 1.87% | 0 | 0 | 0 |
| Green Party | MDG | 1 | 0 | 22 | 17 | 3 | 298 | 4 | 14 | 10 | 33 | 2 | 3 | 33 | 8 | 21 | 469 | 0.53% | 0 | 0 | 0 |
| County Lists for Environment and Solidarity | FMS | 0 | 1 | 11 | 1 | 0 | 190 | 8 | 9 | 8 | 32 | 0 | 5 | 8 | 6 | 8 | 287 | 0.32% | 0 | 0 | 0 |
| Valid votes | | 554 | 1,017 | 5,677 | 5,518 | 953 | 40,402 | 3,333 | 2,463 | 3,788 | 7,655 | 1,372 | 1,078 | 4,365 | 3,086 | 7,078 | 88,339 | 100.00% | 5 | 0 | 5 |
| Rejected votes | | 1 | 0 | 6 | 7 | 0 | 34 | 4 | 1 | 0 | 3 | 1 | 3 | 5 | 5 | 8 | 78 | 0.09% | | | |
| Total polled | | 555 | 1,017 | 5,683 | 5,525 | 953 | 40,436 | 3,337 | 2,464 | 3,788 | 7,658 | 1,373 | 1,081 | 4,370 | 3,091 | 7,086 | 88,417 | 84.66% | | | |
| Registered electors | | 634 | 1,151 | 6,724 | 6,544 | 1,113 | 47,838 | 4,095 | 2,934 | 4,481 | 9,126 | 1,608 | 1,275 | 5,135 | 3,538 | 8,247 | 104,443 | | | | |
| Turnout | | 87.54% | 88.36% | 84.52% | 84.43% | 85.62% | 84.53% | 81.49% | 83.98% | 84.53% | 83.91% | 85.39% | 84.78% | 85.10% | 87.37% | 85.92% | 84.66% | | | | |

The following candidates were elected:

- Constituency seats - John G. Bernander (H); Aud Blattmann (Ap); Vidar Kleppe (FrP); Jon Lilletun (KrF); and Sigurd Verdal (Ap).

===== 1985 =====
Results of the 1985 parliamentary election held on 8 and 9 September 1985:

| Party | | Party | | | List Alliance | | |
| Party | | Votes | % | Seats | Votes | % | Seats |
|---|---|---|---|---|---|---|---|
| Conservative Party | H | 26,480 | 31.18% | 2 | 26,480 | 31.40% | 2 |
| Labour Party | Ap | 26,314 | 30.98% | 2 | 26,314 | 31.21% | 2 |
| Christian Democratic Party | KrF | 15,183 | 17.88% | 1 | 22,150 | 26.27% | 1 |
| Centre Party | Sp | 6,837 | 8.05% | 0 | 22,150 | 26.27% | 1 |
| Liberal People's Party | DLF | 748 | 0.88% | 0 | 22,150 | 26.27% | 1 |
| Progress Party | FrP | 3,279 | 3.86% | 0 | 3,279 | 3.89% | 0 |
| Liberal Party | V | 2,522 | 2.97% | 0 | 2,522 | 2.99% | 0 |
| Socialist Left Party | SV | 2,165 | 2.55% | 0 | 2,165 | 2.58% | 0 |
| Pensioners' Party | PP | 1,162 | 1.37% | 0 | 1,162 | 1.38% | 0 |
| Red Electoral Alliance | RV | 173 | 0.20% | 0 | 173 | 0.21% | 0 |
| Communist Party of Norway | K | 59 | 0.07% | 0 | 59 | 0.07% | 0 |
| Free Elected Representatives | | 17 | 0.02% | 0 | 17 | 0.02% | 0 |
| Valid votes | | 84,939 | 100.00% | 5 | 84,321 | 100.00% | 5 |
| Rejected votes | | 66 | 0.08% | | | | |
| Total polled | | 85,005 | 84.44% | | | | |
| Registered electors | | 100,670 | | | | | |

As the list alliance was not entitled to more seats contesting as an alliance than it was contesting as individual parties, the distribution of seats was as party votes.

The following candidates were elected: Tore Austad (H); Aud Blattmann (Ap); Ole Frithjof Klemsdal (H); Harald Synnes (KrF); and Sigurd Verdal (Ap).

===== 1981 =====
Results of the 1981 parliamentary election held on 13 and 14 September 1981:

| Party | | Votes | % | Seats |
|---|---|---|---|---|
| Conservative Party | H | 27,699 | 34.37% | 2 |
| Labour Party | Ap | 21,551 | 26.74% | 2 |
| Christian Democratic Party | KrF | 15,388 | 19.10% | 1 |
| Centre Party | Sp | 6,664 | 8.27% | 0 |
| Progress Party | FrP | 3,121 | 3.87% | 0 |
| Liberal Party | V | 3,016 | 3.74% | 0 |
| Socialist Left Party | SV | 1,908 | 2.37% | 0 |
| Liberal People's Party | DLF | 518 | 0.64% | 0 |
| Broad-Based Non-Partisan List | | 383 | 0.48% | 0 |
| Red Electoral Alliance | RV | 220 | 0.27% | 0 |
| Communist Party of Norway | K | 98 | 0.12% | 0 |
| Free Elected Representatives | | 15 | 0.02% | 0 |
| Valid votes | | 80,581 | 100.00% | 5 |
| Rejected votes | | 59 | 0.07% | |
| Total polled | | 80,640 | 83.77% | |
| Registered electors | | 96,268 | | |

The following candidates were elected: Tore Austad (H); Ole Frithjof Klemsdal (H); Engly Lie (Ap); Harald Synnes (KrF); and Sigurd Verdal (Ap).

==== 1970s ====
===== 1977 =====
Results of the 1977 parliamentary election held on 11 and 12 September 1977:

| Party | | Votes | % | Seats |
|---|---|---|---|---|
| Labour Party | Ap | 21,846 | 29.93% | 2 |
| Conservative Party | H | 19,334 | 26.48% | 1 |
| Christian Democratic Party | KrF | 18,165 | 24.88% | 1 |
| Centre Party, Liberal Party and New People's Party | Sp-V-DNF | 9,722 | 13.32% | 1 |
| Progress Party | FrP | 1,940 | 2.66% | 0 |
| Socialist Left Party | SV | 1,568 | 2.15% | 0 |
| Red Electoral Alliance | RV | 158 | 0.22% | 0 |
| Communist Party of Norway | K | 100 | 0.14% | 0 |
| Single Person's Party | | 73 | 0.10% | 0 |
| Free Elected Representatives | | 55 | 0.08% | 0 |
| Norwegian Democratic Party | | 39 | 0.05% | 0 |
| Valid votes | | 73,000 | 100.00% | 5 |
| Rejected votes | | 123 | 0.17% | |
| Total polled | | 73,123 | 83.53% | |
| Registered electors | | 87,538 | | |

The following candidates were elected: Tore Austad (H); Engly Lie (Ap); Odd Lien (Ap); Ragnar Udjus (Sp); and Toralf Westermoen (KrF).

===== 1973 =====
Results of the 1973 parliamentary election held on 9 and 10 September 1973:

| Party | | Votes | % | Seats |
|---|---|---|---|---|
| Labour Party | Ap | 16,289 | 24.33% | 2 |
| Christian Democratic Party | KrF | 14,628 | 21.85% | 1 |
| Conservative Party | H | 9,956 | 14.87% | 1 |
| Centre Party | Sp | 7,595 | 11.34% | 1 |
| New People's Party | DNF | 5,329 | 7.96% | 0 |
| Anders Lange's Party | ALP | 4,933 | 7.37% | 0 |
| Socialist Electoral League | SV | 4,699 | 7.02% | 0 |
| Liberal Party | V | 3,119 | 4.66% | 0 |
| Single Person's Party | | 117 | 0.17% | 0 |
| Red Electoral Alliance | RV | 111 | 0.17% | 0 |
| Women's Free Elected Representatives | | 90 | 0.13% | 0 |
| Norwegian Democratic Party | | 88 | 0.13% | 0 |
| Valid votes | | 66,954 | 100.00% | 5 |
| Rejected votes | | 81 | 0.12% | |
| Total polled | | 67,035 | 80.52% | |
| Registered electors | | 83,251 | | |

The following candidates were elected: Engly Lie (Ap); Odd Lien (Ap); Kolbjørn Stordrange (H); Ragnar Udjus (Sp); and Toralf Westermoen (KrF).

==== 1960s ====
===== 1969 =====
Results of the 1969 parliamentary election held on 7 and 8 September 1969:

| Party | | Votes | % | Seats |
|---|---|---|---|---|
| Labour Party | Ap | 21,337 | 33.01% | 2 |
| Liberal Party | V | 13,590 | 21.02% | 1 |
| Conservative Party | H | 10,087 | 15.60% | 1 |
| Christian Democratic Party | KrF | 10,043 | 15.54% | 1 |
| Centre Party | Sp | 7,666 | 11.86% | 0 |
| Socialist People's Party | SF | 1,637 | 2.53% | 0 |
| Communist Party of Norway | K | 282 | 0.44% | 0 |
| Valid votes | | 64,642 | 100.00% | 5 |
| Rejected votes | | 91 | 0.14% | |
| Total polled | | 64,733 | 82.43% | |
| Registered electors | | 78,532 | | |

The following candidates were elected: Jens Haugland (Ap); Bent Røiseland (V); Salve Andreas Salvesen (Ap); Kolbjørn Stordrange (H); and Toralf Westermoen (KrF).

===== 1965 =====
Results of the 1965 parliamentary election held on 12 and 13 September 1965:

| Party | | Votes | % | Seats |
|---|---|---|---|---|
| Labour Party | Ap | 19,413 | 31.71% | 2 |
| Liberal Party | V | 15,045 | 24.58% | 1 |
| Conservative Party | H | 10,313 | 16.85% | 1 |
| Christian Democratic Party | KrF | 7,794 | 12.73% | 1 |
| Centre Party | Sp | 6,005 | 9.81% | 0 |
| Socialist People's Party | SF | 2,643 | 4.32% | 0 |
| Valid votes | | 61,213 | 100.00% | 5 |
| Rejected votes | | 155 | 0.25% | |
| Total polled | | 61,368 | 85.53% | |
| Registered electors | | 71,748 | | |

The following candidates were elected: Jens Haugland (Ap); Bent Røiseland (V); Sverre Walter Rostoft (H); Salve Andreas Salvesen (Ap); and Haakon Sløgedal (KrF).

===== 1961 =====
Results of the 1961 parliamentary election held on 11 September 1961:

| Party | | Votes | % | Seats |
|---|---|---|---|---|
| Liberal Party and Centre Party | V-Sp | 18,770 | 35.12% | 2 |
| Labour Party | Ap | 18,569 | 34.75% | 2 |
| Christian Democratic Party | KrF | 7,684 | 14.38% | 1 |
| Conservative Party | H | 7,676 | 14.36% | 0 |
| Communist Party of Norway | K | 741 | 1.39% | 0 |
| Valid votes | | 53,440 | 100.00% | 5 |
| Rejected votes | | 316 | 0.59% | |
| Total polled | | 53,756 | 77.72% | |
| Registered electors | | 69,169 | | |

A re-run of the election was held in Flekkefjord Municipality, Greipstad Municipality, Oddernes Municipality, and Søgne Municipality after an audit found 30 more ballot papers than were recorded as issued. Results of the election held on 22 January 1962:

| Party | | Votes | % | Seats |
|---|---|---|---|---|
| Labour Party | Ap | 18,102 | 34.24% | 2 |
| Liberal Party and Centre Party | V-Sp | 17,605 | 33.30% | 2 |
| Christian Democratic Party | KrF | 8,257 | 15.62% | 1 |
| Conservative Party | H | 8,094 | 15.31% | 0 |
| Communist Party of Norway | K | 809 | 1.53% | 0 |
| Valid votes | | 52,867 | 100.00% | 5 |
| Rejected votes | | 284 | 0.53% | |
| Total polled | | 53,151 | 76.90% | |
| Registered electors | | 69,114 | | |

The re-run did not lead to changes in the distribution of seats but the order the in which the candidates were elected did change.

The following candidates were elected: Olai Ingemar Eikeland (V-Sp), 17,585 votes; Jens Haugland (Ap), 18,103 votes; Ole Jørgensen (Ap), 18,098 votes; Bent Røiseland (V-Sp), 17,598 votes; and Haakon Sløgedal (KrF), 8,257 votes.

==== 1950s ====
===== 1957 =====
Results of the 1957 parliamentary election held on 7 October 1957:

| Party | | Votes | % | Seats |
|---|---|---|---|---|
| Labour Party | Ap | 18,092 | 34.22% | 2 |
| Liberal Party | V | 13,908 | 26.31% | 1 |
| Farmers' Party | Bp | 6,948 | 13.14% | 1 |
| Conservative Party | H | 6,680 | 12.64% | 1 |
| Christian Democratic Party | KrF | 6,569 | 12.43% | 0 |
| Communist Party of Norway | K | 665 | 1.26% | 0 |
| Valid votes | | 52,862 | 100.00% | 5 |
| Rejected votes | | 257 | 0.48% | |
| Total polled | | 53,119 | 79.06% | |
| Registered electors | | 67,191 | | |

The following candidates were elected: Kaare Steel Groos (H); Trygve Haugeland (Bp); Jens Haugland (Ap); Ole Jørgensen (Ap); and Bent Røiseland (V).

===== 1953 =====
Results of the 1953 parliamentary election held on 12 October 1953:

| Party | | Votes | % | Seats |
|---|---|---|---|---|
| Labour Party | Ap | 17,539 | 33.85% | 2 |
| Liberal Party | V | 12,814 | 24.73% | 1 |
| Conservative Party | H | 7,643 | 14.75% | 1 |
| Christian Democratic Party | KrF | 6,494 | 12.53% | 1 |
| Farmers' Party | Bp | 6,430 | 12.41% | 0 |
| Communist Party of Norway | K | 891 | 1.72% | 0 |
| Valid votes | | 51,811 | 100.00% | 5 |
| Rejected votes | | 352 | 0.67% | |
| Total polled | | 52,163 | 79.20% | |
| Registered electors | | 65,859 | | |

The following candidates were elected: Arne Askildsen (KrF); Jens Haugland (Ap); Ole Jørgensen (Ap); Bent Røiseland (V); and Sverre Walter Rostoft (H).

==== 1940s ====
===== 1949 =====
Results of the 1949 parliamentary election held on 10 October 1949:

| Party | | Votes | % | Seats |
|---|---|---|---|---|
| Liberal Party | V | 9,600 | 28.77% | 2 |
| Labour Party | Ap | 9,488 | 28.43% | 1 |
| Conservative Party and Farmers' Party | H-Bp | 9,472 | 28.39% | 1 |
| Christian Democratic Party | KrF | 4,245 | 12.72% | 0 |
| Communist Party of Norway | K | 456 | 1.37% | 0 |
| Society Party | Samfp | 107 | 0.32% | 0 |
| Valid votes | | 33,368 | 100.00% | 4 |
| Rejected votes | | 301 | 0.89% | |
| Total polled | | 33,669 | 81.50% | |
| Registered electors | | 41,314 | | |

The following candidates were elected: Aasmund Kulien (Ap); Syvert Tobiassen Messel (V); Gabriel Moseid (H-Bp); and Bent Røiseland (V).

===== 1945 =====
Results of the 1945 parliamentary election held on 8 October 1945:

| Party | | Votes | % | Seats |
|---|---|---|---|---|
| Liberal Party | V | 10,410 | 37.17% | 2 |
| Labour Party | Ap | 8,467 | 30.23% | 1 |
| Farmers' Party | Bp | 5,390 | 19.25% | 1 |
| Conservative Party | H | 3,737 | 13.34% | 0 |
| Wild Votes | | 1 | 0.00% | 0 |
| Valid votes | | 28,005 | 100.00% | 4 |
| Rejected votes | | 310 | 1.09% | |
| Total polled | | 28,315 | 71.66% | |
| Registered electors | | 39,515 | | |

The following candidates were elected: Karl Johan Fjermeros (V); Aasmund Kulien (Ap); Gabriel Moseid (Bp); and Bent Røiseland (V).

==== 1930s ====
===== 1936 =====
Results of the 1936 parliamentary election held on 19 October 1936:

| Party | | Party | | | List Alliance | | |
| Party | | Votes | % | Seats | Votes | % | Seats |
|---|---|---|---|---|---|---|---|
| Liberal Party | V | 11,089 | 37.86% | 2 | 11,089 | 37.87% | 1 |
| Farmers' Party | Bp | 6,530 | 22.29% | 1 | 11,532 | 39.38% | 2 |
| Conservative Party | H | 5,007 | 17.09% | 0 | 11,532 | 39.38% | 2 |
| Labour Party | Ap | 6,188 | 21.13% | 1 | 6,188 | 21.13% | 1 |
| Fishermen's Left | | 263 | 0.90% | 0 | 263 | 0.90% | 0 |
| Society Party | Samfp | 147 | 0.50% | 0 | 147 | 0.50% | 0 |
| Nasjonal Samling | NS | 66 | 0.23% | 0 | 66 | 0.23% | 0 |
| Valid votes | | 29,290 | 100.00% | 4 | 29,285 | 100.00% | 4 |
| Rejected votes | | 225 | 0.76% | | | | |
| Total polled | | 29,515 | 83.74% | | | | |
| Registered electors | | 35,246 | | | | | |

As the list alliance was entitled to more seats contesting as an alliance than it was contesting as individual parties, the distribution of seats was as list alliance votes. The H-Bp list alliance's additional seat was allocated to the Conservative Party.

The following candidates were elected: Nils Holbek (V); Aasmund Kulien (Ap); Gabriel Moseid (Bp); and August Skeibrok (H).

===== 1933 =====
Results of the 1933 parliamentary election held on 16 October 1933:

| Party | | Votes | % | Seats |
|---|---|---|---|---|
| Liberal Party | V | 8,676 | 35.35% | 1 |
| Farmers' Party | Bp | 6,760 | 27.55% | 1 |
| Conservative Party | H | 4,669 | 19.03% | 1 |
| Labour Party | Ap | 4,435 | 18.07% | 1 |
| Valid votes | | 24,540 | 100.00% | 4 |
| Rejected votes | | 128 | 0.52% | |
| Total polled | | 24,668 | 74.69% | |
| Registered electors | | 33,026 | | |

The following candidates were elected: Gunnuf Eiesland (V); Gabriel Moseid (Bp); August Skeibrok (H); and Alfred Udland (Ap).

===== 1930 =====
Results of the 1930 parliamentary election held on 20 October 1930:

| Party | | Votes | % | Seats |
|---|---|---|---|---|
| Liberal Party | V | 10,055 | 41.30% | 2 |
| Farmers' Party | Bp | 6,754 | 27.74% | 1 |
| Conservative Party | H | 4,288 | 17.61% | 1 |
| Labour Party | Ap | 3,248 | 13.34% | 0 |
| Valid votes | | 24,345 | 100.00% | 4 |
| Rejected votes | | 95 | 0.39% | |
| Total polled | | 24,440 | 78.39% | |
| Registered electors | | 31,177 | | |

The following candidates were elected: Nils Salveson Belland (V); Gunnuf Eiesland (V); Gabriel Moseid (Bp); and August Skeibrok (H).

==== 1920s ====
===== 1927 =====
Results of the 1927 parliamentary election held on 17 October 1927:

| Party | | Votes | % | Seats |
|---|---|---|---|---|
| Liberal Party | V | 5,616 | 33.09% | 2 |
| Farmers' Party | Bp | 5,115 | 30.13% | 1 |
| Labour Party | Ap | 3,506 | 20.66% | 1 |
| Conservative Party | H | 2,736 | 16.12% | 0 |
| Wild Votes | | 1 | 0.01% | 0 |
| Valid votes | | 16,974 | 100.00% | 4 |
| Rejected votes | | 133 | 0.78% | |
| Total polled | | 17,107 | 55.05% | |
| Registered electors | | 31,078 | | |

The following candidates were elected: Nils Salveson Belland (V); Gunnuf Eiesland (V); Gabriel Moseid (Bp); and Alfred Udland (Ap).

===== 1924 =====
Results of the 1924 parliamentary election held on 21 October 1924:

| Party | | Votes | % | Seats |
|---|---|---|---|---|
| Liberal Party | V | 6,504 | 40.09% | 2 |
| Farmers' Party | Bp | 4,393 | 27.08% | 1 |
| Conservative Party and Free-minded Liberal Party | H-FV | 3,617 | 22.29% | 1 |
| Labour Party | Ap | 1,711 | 10.55% | 0 |
| Valid votes | | 16,225 | 100.00% | 4 |
| Rejected votes | | 209 | 1.27% | |
| Total polled | | 16,434 | 54.24% | |
| Registered electors | | 30,296 | | |

The following candidates were elected: Nils Salveson Belland (V); Gunnuf Eiesland (V); Gabriel Moseid (Bp); and Karl Sanne (H-FV).

===== 1921 =====
Results of the 1921 parliamentary election held on 24 October 1921:

| Party | | Votes | % | Seats |
|---|---|---|---|---|
| Liberal Party | V | 6,822 | 39.36% | 2 |
| Norwegian Farmers' Association | L | 4,895 | 28.24% | 1 |
| Conservative Party | H | 3,628 | 20.93% | 1 |
| Labour Party | Ap | 1,622 | 9.36% | 0 |
| Social Democratic Labour Party of Norway | S | 348 | 2.01% | 0 |
| Wild Votes | | 19 | 0.11% | 0 |
| Valid votes | | 17,334 | 100.00% | 4 |
| Rejected votes | | 231 | 1.32% | |
| Total polled | | 17,565 | 57.22% | |
| Registered electors | | 30,695 | | |

The following candidates were elected: Nils Salveson Belland (V); Gunnuf Eiesland (V); Gabriel Moseid (L); and Karl Sanne (H).
