= Ingelise =

Ingelise is a feminine given name. Notable people with the given name include:

- Ingelise Driehuis (born 1967), Dutch tennis player
- Ingelise Udjus (1920–2001), Norwegian resistance member, educator, and civil servant
