= Agder (disambiguation) =

Agder is a county in southern Norway.

Agder may also refer to:

== Places ==
- Agder Township, Marshall County, Minnesota, a township in Minnesota, USA
- University of Agder, a university in southern Norway
- Agder Police District, a police district in Norway

== Other ==
- Agder Tidend, a newspaper in southern Norway
- Agder Energi, an energy company in Norway
- Agder Court of Appeal, an appeals court in Norway
- Agder District Court, a district court in Norway
