= Hans Fredrik Grøvan =

Norwegian politician (born 1953)

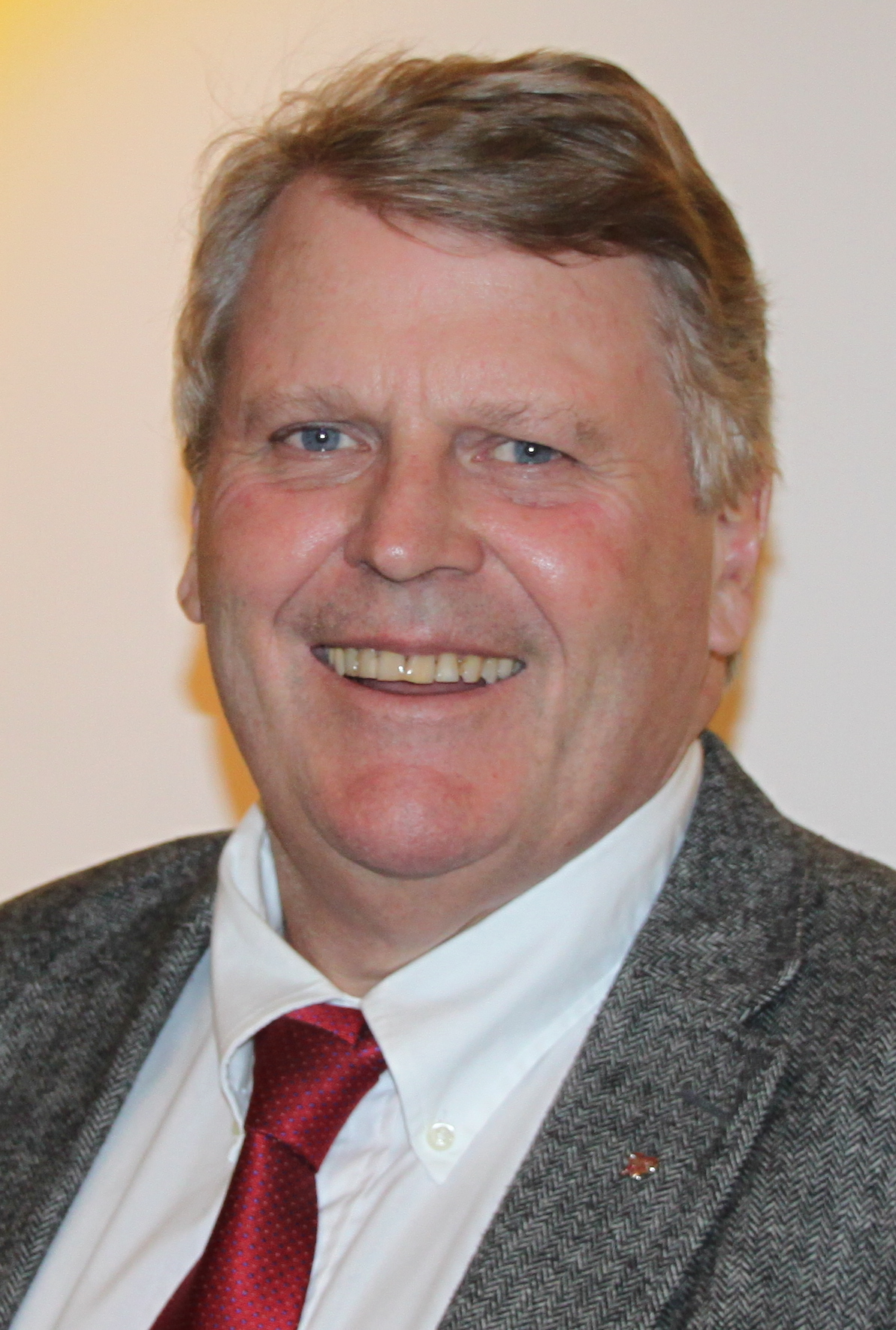

Christian Democratic Parliamentary Leader
- In office 29 January 2019 – 30 September 2021
- Deputy: Geir Jørgen Bekkevold
- Leader: Kjell Ingolf Ropstad
- Preceded by: Knut Arild Hareide
- Succeeded by: Olaug Bollestad

Member of the Norwegian Parliament
- In office 1 October 2013 – 30 September 2021
- Constituency: Vest-Agder

Mayor of Lyngdal Municipality
- In office 18 October 1995 – 17 October 2007
- Preceded by: Anders Nøkland
- Succeeded by: Ingunn Foss

Personal details
- Born: 1 November 1953 (age 72) Kristiansand, Vest-Agder, Norway
- Party: Christian Democratic

Hans Fredrik Grøvan (born 1 November 1953) is a Norwegian politician for the Christian Democratic Party who was a member of the Storting from 2013 to 2021. He served as the party’s parliamentary leader from 2019 to 2021.

== Career ==
=== Parliament ===
He was elected to the Norwegian Parliament from Vest-Agder in 2013. He served as a deputy representative to the Norwegian Parliament from Vest-Agder during the term 2001–2005.

On 29 January 2019, Grøvan was appointed the party’s parliamentary leader after Knut Arild Hareide resigned from the position.

Grøvan ran for re-election for the 2021 election, but lost the nomination to Jorunn Gleditsch Lossius in November 2020. The party went on to lose five seats in Parliament in the election on 13 September 2021.

Grøvan was the chairman of the pro-Israel caucus Friends of Israel in the Parliament of Norway for a total of six years. His fondness for Israel goes back to him working at a kibbutz in 1972.

=== Local politics ===
On the local level, he was the mayor of Lyngdal Municipality from 1995 to 2007. He was chairman of the board of Agder Energi to 2005.
