= Alf Erik Andersen =

Norwegian politician (born 1947)

Member of the Storting
- Incumbent
- Assumed office 1 October 2025
- Constituency: Vest-Agder

Fourth Vice President of the Storting
- Incumbent
- Assumed office 23 April 2026
- President: Masud Gharahkhani (Ap)
- Preceded by: Morten Stordalen (FrP)

Mayor of Lindesnes Municipality
- In office 12 October 2023 – 30 October 2025
- Deputy: Even Tronstad Sagebakken (Ap)
- Preceded by: Even Tronstad Sagebakken (Ap)
- Succeeded by: Paal Pedersen (H)

Mayor of Mandal Municipality
- In office 2015–2019
- Deputy: Ingvild Wetrhus Thorsvik (V)
- Preceded by: Tore Askildsen (KrF)
- Succeeded by: none (the municipality was merged into Lindesnes Municipality

Personal details
- Born: 12 August 1973 (age 53)
- Party: Progress

Alf Erik Bergstøl Andersen (born 12 August 1973) is a Norwegian politician for the Progress Party.

Andersen was elected mayor of Mandal Municipality in 2015, heading a centre-right coalition with Ingvild Wetrhus Thorsvik as deputy mayor. Following the 2019 election, Andersen had to see Labour's Even Tronstad Sagebakken take over as mayor. Mandal municipality was also incorporated into Lindesnes Municipality on 1 January 2020. The 2023 election was the first election in this new municipality, and saw Alf Erik Andersen regain his mayoral title. This time, Even Tronstad Sagebakken was deputy mayor.

In national politics, Andersen was named as a State Secretary in the Ministry of Justice and the Police in 2019. The Progress Party exited Solberg's Cabinet in 2020. Andersen was elected as a deputy representative to the Parliament of Norway for Vest-Agder in 2021. Among others, Andersen met in Parliament as Gisle Meininger Saudland was granted an absence of leave in late 2024. He was elected to the Storting in 2025. Because of this, he could no longer serve as Mayor of Lindesnes and Paal Pedersen (H) was chosen as the new Mayor. He joined the Storting presidency in April 2026.
