= Sigurd Manneråk =

Norwegian politician (1942–2003)

Sigurd Manneråk (28 August 1942 – 5 April 2003) was a Norwegian politician for the Centre Party.

He was born in Marnardal Municipality. He was elected to the Norwegian Parliament from Vest-Agder in 1993, but was not re-elected in 1997.

Manneråk was a member of the municipal council of Kvinesdal Municipality during the term 1979–1983, and served as deputy mayor in 1983–1987. During the latter term he was also a member of the Vest-Agder county council.
