= Anne Brit Stråtveit =

Norwegian teacher and politician

Anne Brit Stråtveit (born 22 April 1947) is a Norwegian teacher and politician for the Christian Democratic Party.

She was born in Farsund, and took a teacher's education. She worked as a teacher in Farsund from 1969 to 1970, Sandnes from 1970 to 1975 and Lyngdal from 1975 to 1992 before becoming a school adviser.

She was elected to the Parliament of Norway from Vest-Agder in 1997, but was not re-elected in 2001. She was a member of the Standing Committee on Education, Research and Church Affairs from 1997 to 2000 and the Standing Committee on Defence from 2000 to 2001. She was a member of the municipal council of Lyngdal Municipality from 1995 to 1997 and 2003 to 2007.
