= Kari Henriksen =

Norwegian politician (born 1955)

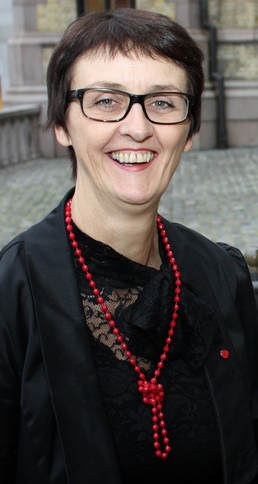

Fourth Vice President of the Storting
- In office 25 November 2021 – 30 September 2025
- President: Masud Gharahkhani
- Preceded by: Sverre Myrli
- Succeeded by: Morten Stordalen

Member of the Storting
- In office 1 October 2009 – 30 September 2025
- Constituency: Vest-Agder

State Secretary for the Ministry of Health and Care Services
- In office 3 December 2007 – 3 April 2009
- Prime Minister: Jens Stoltenberg
- Minister: Sylvia Brustad; Bjarne Håkon Hanssen

Deputy Member of the Storting
- In office 1 October 2005 – 30 September 2009
- Constituency: Vest-Agder

Personal details
- Born: 10 August 1955 (age 70) Vennesla Municipality, Vest-Agder, Norway
- Party: Labour

Kari Henriksen (born 10 August 1955) is a Norwegian politician for the Labour Party. She served as a member of the Storting for Vest-Agder from 2009 to 2025, and the fourth Vice President of the Storting from 2021 to 2025.

== Personal life ==
She was born in Vennesla Municipality.

== Political career ==
=== Parliament ===
She served as a deputy representative to the Norwegian Parliament from Vest-Agder from 2005 to 2009 and was elected as a regular representative in 2009. She was re-elected in 2013, 2017 and 2021. She announced in February 2024 that she would not seek reelection at the 2025 election.

On 24 November 2021, she was nominated as the Storting's fourth Vice President, succeeding fellow party member Sverre Myrli. She was elected the day after, along with Masud Gharahkhani as President of the Storting. After retiring from the Storting, she was succeeded by Morten Stordalen from the Progress Party.

=== Government ===
On 3 December 2007, during the second cabinet Stoltenberg, Henriksen was appointed State Secretary in the Ministry of Health and Care Services. She held the position until 3 April 2009.
