= Alf Egil Holmelid =

Norwegian engineer and politician

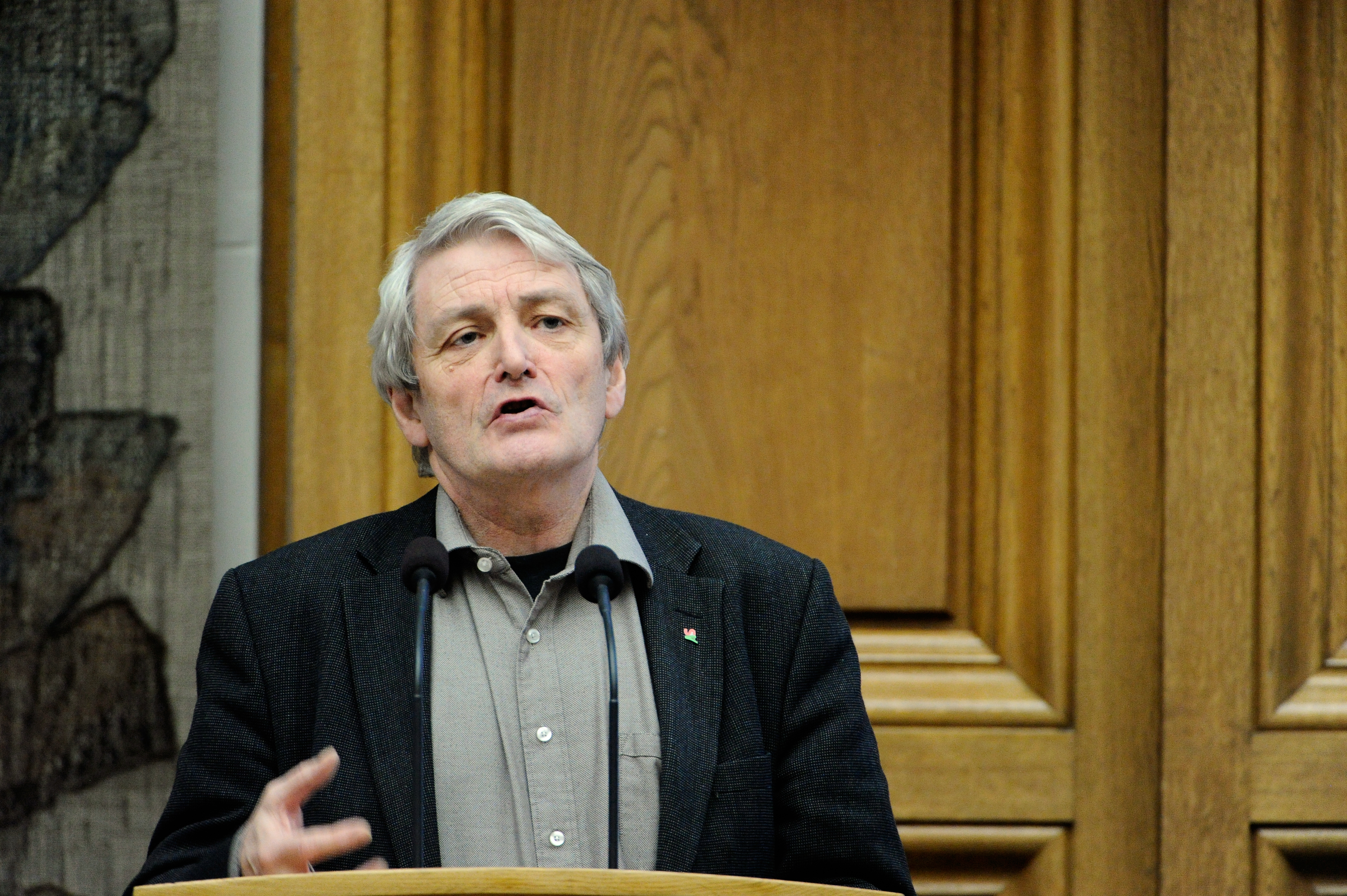
- Born: 13 December 1947 (age 78); Fjaler Municipality, Norway
- Occupations: engineer, politician
- Employer: University of Agder
- Political party: Socialist Left Party

Alf Egil Holmelid (born 13 December 1947) is a Norwegian engineer and politician for the Socialist Left Party.

== Biography ==
Holmelid was research manager at the University of Agder from 2002. He was elected to the Norwegian Parliament from Vest-Agder in 2009, for the term 2009–2013.
