= Norunn Tveiten Benestad =

Norwegian politician (born 1956)

Norunn Tveiten Benestad (born 11 August 1956) is a Norwegian politician and Member of Parliament (Stortinget) from Vest-Agder County, representing the Conservative Party. She was elected at the 2013 Norwegian parliamentary election. She is a member of the Standing Committee on Education, Research and Church Affairs.

Benestad has a background in the publishing industry, and came to Parliament from a position in Cappelen Damm Høyskoleforlaget (publishing). Previously, she worked as a teacher and communications consultant and held positions in Høyskoleforlaget and Norwegian Red Cross and others in the private sector.

At the local level, she has been elected to the City Council of Kristiansand.
