= Rolf Terje Klungland =

Norwegian politician

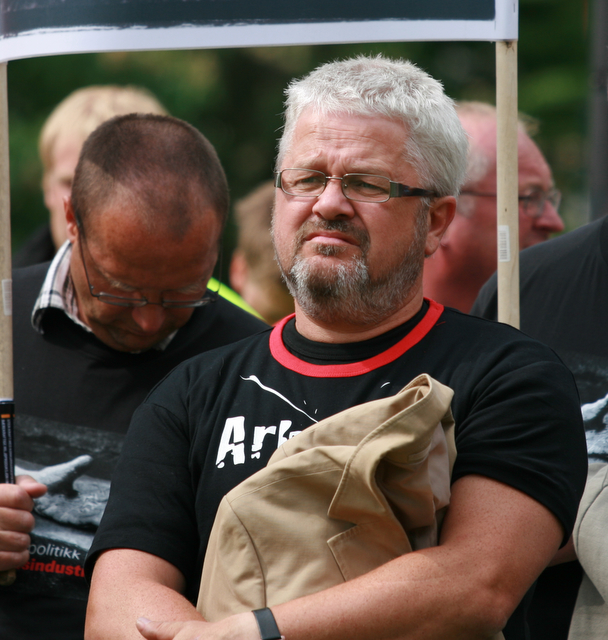
Rolf Terje Klungland.

Rolf Terje Klungland (born 6 July 1963 in Flekkefjord) is a Norwegian politician for the Labour Party.

He was elected to the Norwegian Parliament from Vest-Agder in 1993, and has been re-elected on two occasions. He served as a deputy representative during the term 1997–2001.

On the local level, Klungland was a member of Vest-Agder county council from 1991 to 1995. He has chaired the party chapter in Kvinesdal Municipality since 1997.

Outside politics he spent many years as a factory worker, but in 1999 became "personnel consultant" in Sirdal Municipality. He has been active in the Norwegian Confederation of Trade Unions and the European Movement.
