= Sigurd Verdal =

Norwegian politician

Sigurd Verdal (4 June 1927 – 27 August 2010) was a Norwegian politician for the Labour Party.

Verdal was born in Eiken Municipality in Norway. He was elected to the Norwegian Parliament from Vest-Agder in 1981, and was re-elected on two occasions. He had previously served in the position of deputy representative during the terms 1973–1977 and 1977–1981.

Verdal was a member of the municipal council of Audnedal Municipality in the periods 1969–1971 and 1971–1973. In 1969–1971 he was also a member of the Vest-Agder county council.
