= Aasmund Kulien =

Norwegian politician

Aasmund Kulien (4 May 1893 – 18 October 1988) was a Norwegian politician for the Labour Party.

He was elected to the Norwegian Parliament from Vest-Agder in 1937, and was re-elected on two occasions. He had previously served in the position of deputy representative during the term 1934–1936.

On the local level, Kulien was a member of the municipal council of Greipstad Municipality from 1928 to 1942. He chaired the regional party chapter from 1921 to 1923, and was a member of the national board from 1930 to 1939.

He was born in Kristiansand, worked as a gardener from 1908 but settled as a farmer in Greipstad in 1922. While living there, he served two years as the chief of the fire department, as well as other public posts.
