= Engly Lie =

Norwegian politician

Engly Lie (born 4 August 1919 in Vennesla Municipality, died 1 November 2001) was a Norwegian politician for the Labour Party.

He was elected to the Norwegian Parliament from Vest-Agder in 1973, and was re-elected on two occasions. He had previously served as a deputy representative during the term 1965–1969.

On the local level, he was a member of the municipal council of Vennesla Municipality from 1955 to 1973, serving as mayor from 1959. From 1959 to 1963 he was also a member of Vest-Agder county council.

Outside politics, he worked as a carpenter.
