= Jens Haugland =

Norwegian politician (1910–1991)

Minister of Local Government
- In office 25 September 1963 – 12 October 1965
- Prime Minister: Einar Gerhardsen
- Preceded by: Bjarne Lyngstad
- Succeeded by: Helge Seip

Minister of Justice
- In office 1 November 1955 – 28 August 1963
- Prime Minister: Einar Gerhardsen
- Preceded by: Jens Chr. Hauge
- Succeeded by: Petter Mørch Koren

Member of the Norwegian Parliament
- In office 1 January 1954 – 30 September 1973
- Constituency: Vest-Agder

Personal details
- Born: 16 April 1910 Bjelland Municipality, Lister og Mandal, Norway
- Died: 2 May 1991 (aged 81) Marnardal Municipality, Vest-Agder, Norway
- Party: Labour
- Spouse: Edith Høie

Jens Haugland (16 April 1910 – 2 May 1991) was a Norwegian jurist and politician for the Labour Party.

Haugland was born in Bjelland Municipality in Lister og Mandal county, Norway. He studied law at the University of Oslo and graduated as cand.jur. in 1936. He worked as a jurist in Stavanger and Kristiansand and was district stipendiary magistrate (sorenskriver) of Setesdal. He was a member of the executive committee of the municipal council for Kristiansand Municipality from 1945 to 1954.

He was elected to the Norwegian Parliament from Vest-Agder in 1954, and was re-elected on four occasions. From November 1955 to August 1963, during the third cabinet Gerhardsen, Haugland was Norwegian Minister of Justice and the Police. During the fourth cabinet Gerhardsen from September 1963 to 1965, he was Norwegian Minister of Local Government and Labour. During this period his seat in parliament was taken by Trygve Hanssen, Salve Andreas Salvesen and Olav Tonning Munkejord.

Later he was a Supreme Court judge based out of Bjelland from 1980 to 1991. He was chairman of the Norwegian Committee on Greece from 1968 to 1970, and was a board member of Noregs Mållag from 1975 to 1977. He was a columnist in Sørlandet and Fædrelandsvennen, and published a number of books.

Political offices
Preceded by Jens Christian Hauge	Norwegian Minister of Justice and the Police; 1955–1963	Succeeded by Petter Mørch Koren
Preceded by Bjarne Lyngstad	Norwegian Minister of Local Government and Labour; 1963–1965	Succeeded by Helge Seip
