= Harald Synnes =

Norwegian politician

Harald Synnes (18 March 1931 – 17 May 2012) was a Norwegian politician for the Christian Democratic Party.

He was born in Bø Municipality. He was mayor of Kristiansand Municipality from 1976 to 1978. He was a member of the Parliament of Norway from 1981 to 1989, representing Vest-Agder.
