= Kaare Steel Groos =

Norwegian politician (1917–1994)

Kaare Steel Groos (26 October 1917 – 20 February 1994) is a Norwegian politician for the Conservative Party.

He was born in Grimstad. He was elected to the Norwegian Parliament from Vest-Agder in 1958, but was not re-elected in 1961.

Groos was involved in local politics in Kristiansand Municipality from 1947 to 1959, serving as deputy mayor in the period 1955–1957. He chaired the local party chapter from 1948 to 1949.

Outside politics he worked as a jurist, having graduated as cand.jur. in 1941. He was also active in scouting as well as freemasonry.
