= Olai Ingemar Eikeland =

Norwegian politician

Olai Ingemar Eikeland (23 July 1915 – 14 April 2003) was a Norwegian politician for the Centre Party.

He was elected to the Norwegian Parliament from Vest-Agder in 1961, and was re-elected in the 1962 revote. He had previously served in the position of deputy representative in the period 1958–1961.

Eikeland was born in Vennesla Municipality and a member of the municipal council of Vennesla Municipality in the years 1947–1951 and 1954–1975. From 1975 to 1983 he was a member of Vest-Agder county council.

Outside politics he was a farmer. He chaired the regional chapter of the Norwegian Agrarian Association on two occasions, and became honorary member in 1983. He was also active in the Evangelical Lutheran Free Church of Norway.
