= Haakon Sløgedal =

Norwegian politician

Haakon Sløgedal (14 July 1901 – 15 July 1979) was a Norwegian politician for the Christian Democratic Party.

He was born in Holum Municipality. He was elected to the Norwegian Parliament from Vest-Agder in 1961, and was re-elected in the 1962 revote and the 1965 general election.

Sløgedal was a member of the municipal council of Søgne Municipality between 1995 and 1967, serving as deputy mayor in the periods 1957–1959, 1959–1963 and 1963–1965.
