= Henning Skumsvoll =

Norwegian politician

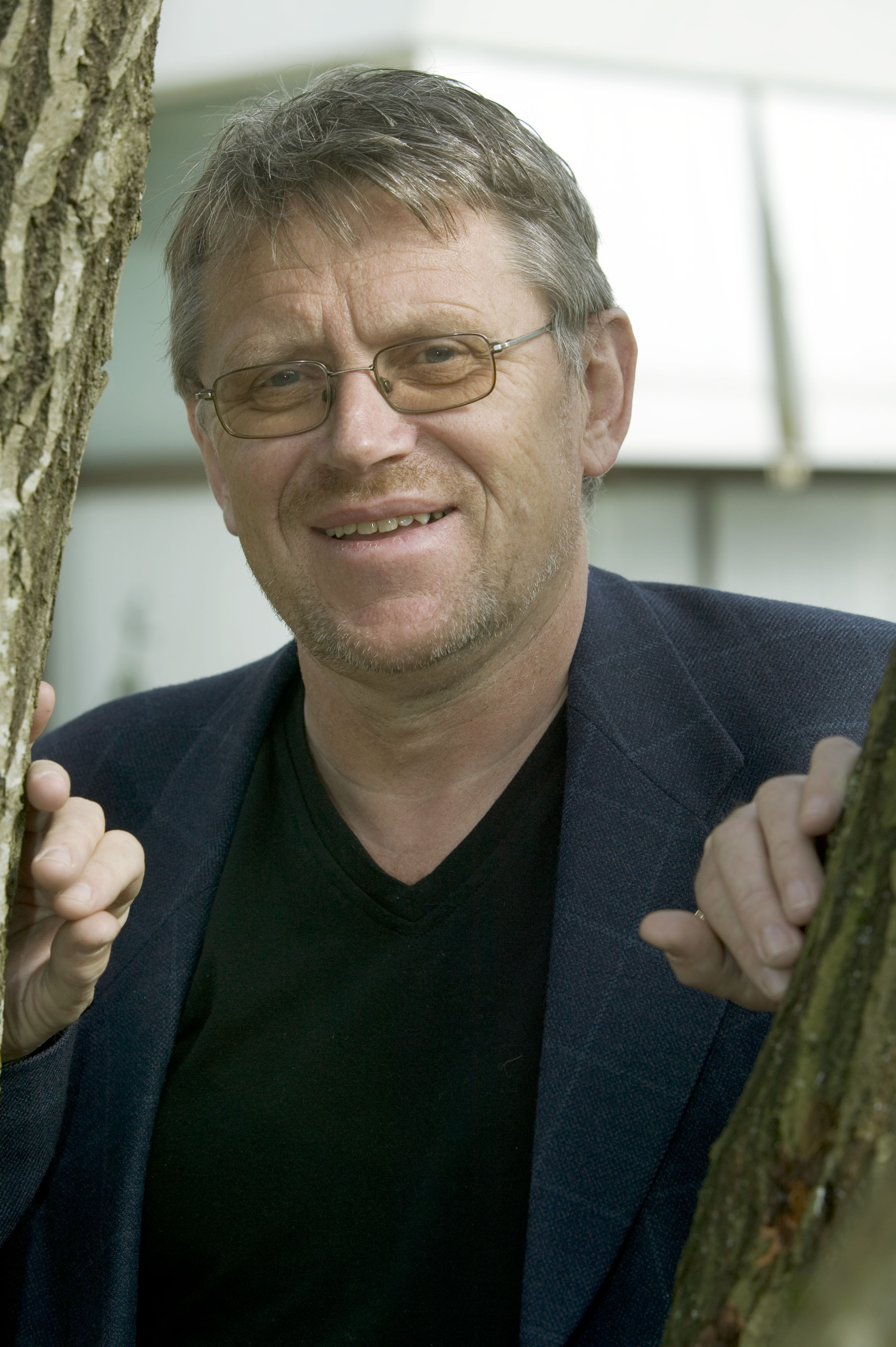
- Henning Skumsvoll

Member of the Storting
- Incumbent
- Assumed office 2005
- Constituency: Vest-Agder

Personal details
- Born: March 15, 1947 (age 79) Farsund, Norway
- Party: Progress Party
- Education: Civil Engineering; Business Administration
- Alma mater: Heriot-Watt University

Henning Skumsvoll (born 15 March 1947 in Farsund) is a Norwegian politician representing the Progress Party. He is currently a representative of Vest-Agder in the Storting, he was first elected in 2005. He was elected vice leader of the Vest Agder Progress Party in February 2004.

Skumsvoll has degrees in Civil Engineering and Business Administration from Heriot-Watt University in Scotland.

== Parliamentary Committee duties ==
- 2005–2009 vice-secretary of the Odelsting.
- 2005–2009 member of the Defence committee.
- 2005–2009 member of the Extended Foreign Affairs committee.
