= Ola Svenneby =

Norwegian politician

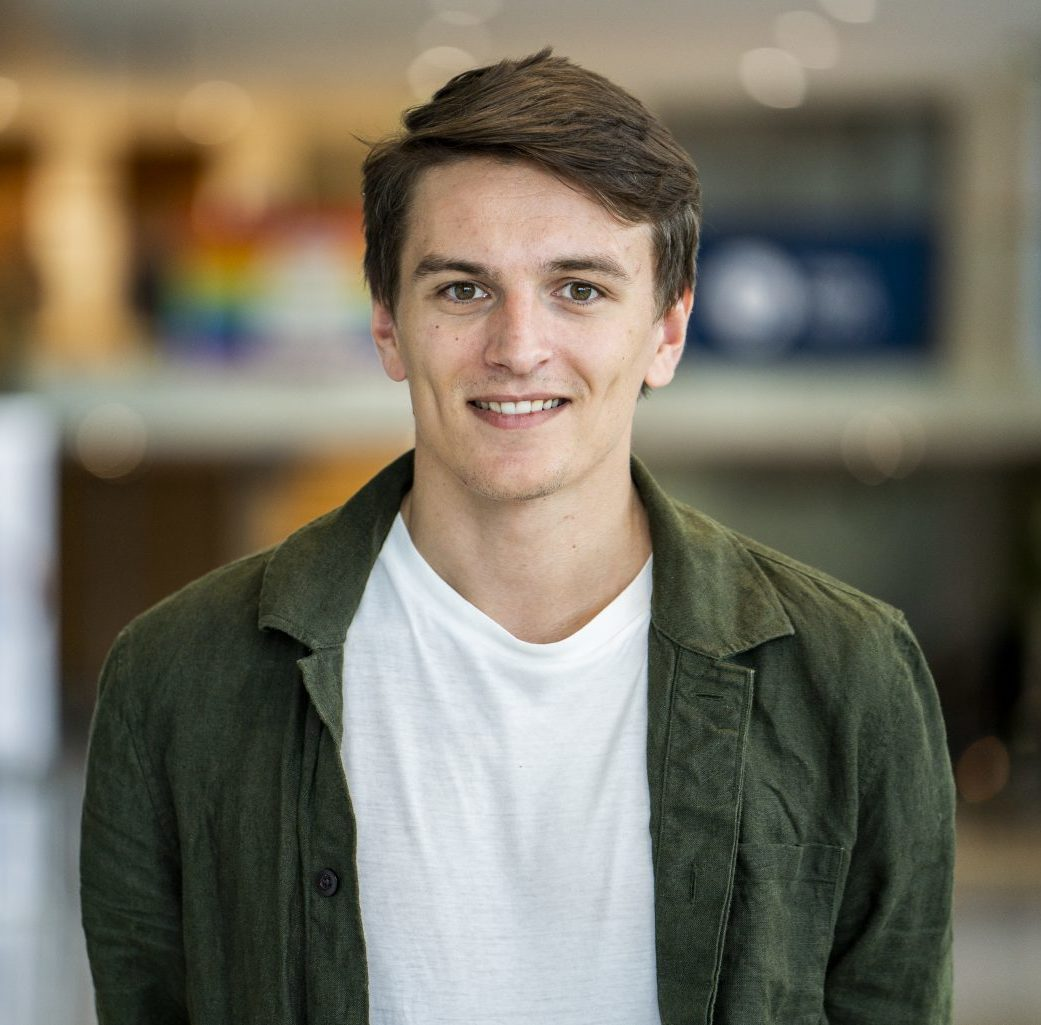
- Svenneby in 2021

Second Deputy Leader of the Conservative Party
- Incumbent
- Assumed office 14 February 2026
- Leader: Ine Eriksen Søreide
- Preceded by: Tina Bru

Deputy Member of the Storting
- Incumbent
- Assumed office 1 October 2021
- Constituency: Hedmark (2021–2025); Oslo (2025–)

Leader of the Young Conservatives
- In office 3 October 2020 – 14 February 2026
- First Deputy: Håkon Snortheim; Oda Sivertsen
- Second Deputy: Leon Knutsen; Emma Erlandsen; Nicolai Østeby
- Preceded by: Sandra Bruflot
- Succeeded by: Oda Sivertsen

Personal details
- Born: 23 March 1997 (age 29) Våler, Hedmark, Norway
- Party: Conservative
- Education: University of Oslo

Ola Svenneby (born 23 March 1997) is a Norwegian politician currently serving as the second deputy leader of the Conservative Party since 2026 and a deputy member of parliament for Oslo since 2025 and previously for Hedmark. A member of the Conservative Party, he previously served as the leader of the Norwegian Young Conservatives from 2020 to 2026 and as its deputy leader from 2018 to 2020.

== Political career ==
=== Norwegian Young Conservatives ===
In 2017, Svenneby won the Norwegian Young Conservatives' elite course.

Svenneby served as the second deputy leader of the Norwegian Young Conservatives from 2018 to 2020 under the leadership of Sandra Bruflot. At the 2020 convention, he was elected to succeed her beating his rival Amalie Gunnufsen in a 106–86 vote. He was re-elected in 2022 and 2024. He announced in October 2025 that he wouldn't be seeking re-election at the next convention in 2026. He resigned after being elected as the nationwide party's second deputy leader and was succeeded by Oda Sivertsen.

During his tenure as leader, he went against the mother party regarding the 2011 Norway attacks and argued that the right wing of the political spectrum also had some responsibility in addressing far-right extremism. He caused some controversy following his party's victory at the 2023 school elections, held five days before the 2023 local elections, when he declared "the Greta Thunberg generation dead". He later apologised for his comment and took self-criticism for it.

=== Party politics ===
In November 2025, Svenneby announced his candidacy for the deputy leadership of the Conservative Party. The party's election committee designated him as second deputy leader on 11 December, alongside Henrik Asheim as first deputy leader and Ine Eriksen Søreide as leader. The trio were formally elected at the party's extrodinary convention on 14 February 2026.

=== Parliament ===
Svenneby was elected as a deputy member for Hedmark at the 2021 election. In 2025, he was elected as a deputy member for Oslo.

== Personal life ==
Svenneby grew up at his family farm in Våler Municipality, the oldest son of Brede Svenneby and Tove Flobergsæter. He has one younger brother. He is openly gay and came out at the age of fifteen. He was diagnosed with ADHD in 2021. He lives in Oslo with his partner, former Norwegian Young Conservatives politician Mathias Opdal Weseth. Svenneby announced in October 2026 that they had separated. He has Forest Finnish roots.
