= Kåre Østensen =

Norwegian ice hockey player

Kåre Nordahl Østensen
- Born: 5 December 1943 (age 82) Oslo, Norway
- Played for: IK Tigrene; Frisk Tigers
- National team: Norway

Kåre Nordahl Østensen (born 5 December 1943) is a Norwegian ice hockey player. He played for the Norwegian national ice hockey team, and participated at the Winter Olympics in 1964, 1968 and 1972.

He played for the club IK Tigrene.

He played a total of 61 matches for the national team during his career.
