= Amalie Gunnufsen =

Norwegian politician (born 1996)

Member of the Storting
- Incumbent
- Assumed office 1 October 2025
- Constituency: Vest-Agder

Personal details
- Born: 30 June 1996 (age 29)
- Party: Conservative

Amalie Gunnufsen (born 30 June 1996) is a Norwegian politician who was elected member of the Storting in 2025. From 2021 to 2025, she was a deputy member of the Storting.

== Political career ==
=== Norwegian Young Conservatives ===
At the 2020 Norwegian Young Conservatives convention, she ran for the leadership, but ultimately lost to Ola Svenneby in a 106–86 vote.
