= Ragnar Udjus =

Norwegian media personality and politician

Ragnar Udjus (born 10 October 1933 in Landvik Municipality, Norway) is a Norwegian media personality and politician for the Centre Party.

From 1972 to 1973, during Korvald's Cabinet, Udjus was appointed political secretary (political advisor) in the Ministry of the Environment. He was elected to the Norwegian Parliament from Vest-Agder in 1973, and was re-elected on one occasion. He was a member of the national party board from 1971 to 1974.

Outside politics he spent most of his career in the local radio station Radio Sør. He also worked as chief editor in Agder Tidend from 1965 to 1968 and in the Norwegian Broadcasting Corporation.

His grandson Kenneth Udjus is a professional footballer.
