= Ole Frithjof Klemsdal =

Norwegian politician

Ole Frithjof Klemsdal (26 July 1923 – 18 August 2008) was a Norwegian politician for the Conservative Party.

He was elected to the Norwegian Parliament from Vest-Agder in 1981, and was re-elected on one occasion. He had previously served in the position of deputy representative during the term 1973–1977.

Born in Mandal, he was a member of Mandal city council from 1953 to 1963, serving as deputy mayor from 1957 to 1958.

He had education from a business school and a technical school, and spent most of his career as an administrator at Mandal Motorfabrikk.
