= Aud Blattmann =

Norwegian politician (1937–2023)

Aud Blattmann (26 September 1937 – 5 June 2023) was a Norwegian politician for the Labour Party.

== Biography ==
Blattmann was born in Kristiansand on 26 September 1937. She was elected to the Norwegian Parliament from Vest-Agder in 1985, and was re-elected on three occasions. She had previously served in the position of deputy representative during the term 1981–1985.

Blattmann died on 5 June 2023, at the age of 85.
