= Cecilie Østensen Berglund =

Norwegian judge (born 1971)

Cecilie Østensen Berglund (born 2 October 1971) is a Norwegian judge. She graduated with a cand.jur. degree in 1998. She worked for many years in the Supreme Court of Norway before serving as a judge in the Borgarting Court of Appeal starting in 2009. She was appointed as a Supreme Court justice in 2017.
