= Agder Tidend =

Norwegian newspaper

Agder Tidend was a Norwegian newspaper, published in Kristiansand and mainly distributed in the district of Agder, from 1919 to 1985. The newspaper was affiliated with the Farmers party.

== History and profile ==
Agder Tidend was started on 1 September 1919. The first editor was Ivar Høvik. Among its later editors were Hans Aarnes from 1923 to 1932, and Ragnar Udjus from 1965 to 1968.
