= Mirell Høyer-Berntsen =

Norwegian politician

Member of the Storting
- Incumbent
- Assumed office 2025
- Constituency: Vest-Agder

Personal details
- Party: Socialist Left Party

Mirell Høyer-Berntsen is a Norwegian politician for the Socialist Left Party. She has been a member of the Storting since 2025.

She is a trade unionist.

== See also ==
- List of members of the Storting, 2025–2029
