= Ingunn Foss =

Norwegian politician (born 1960)

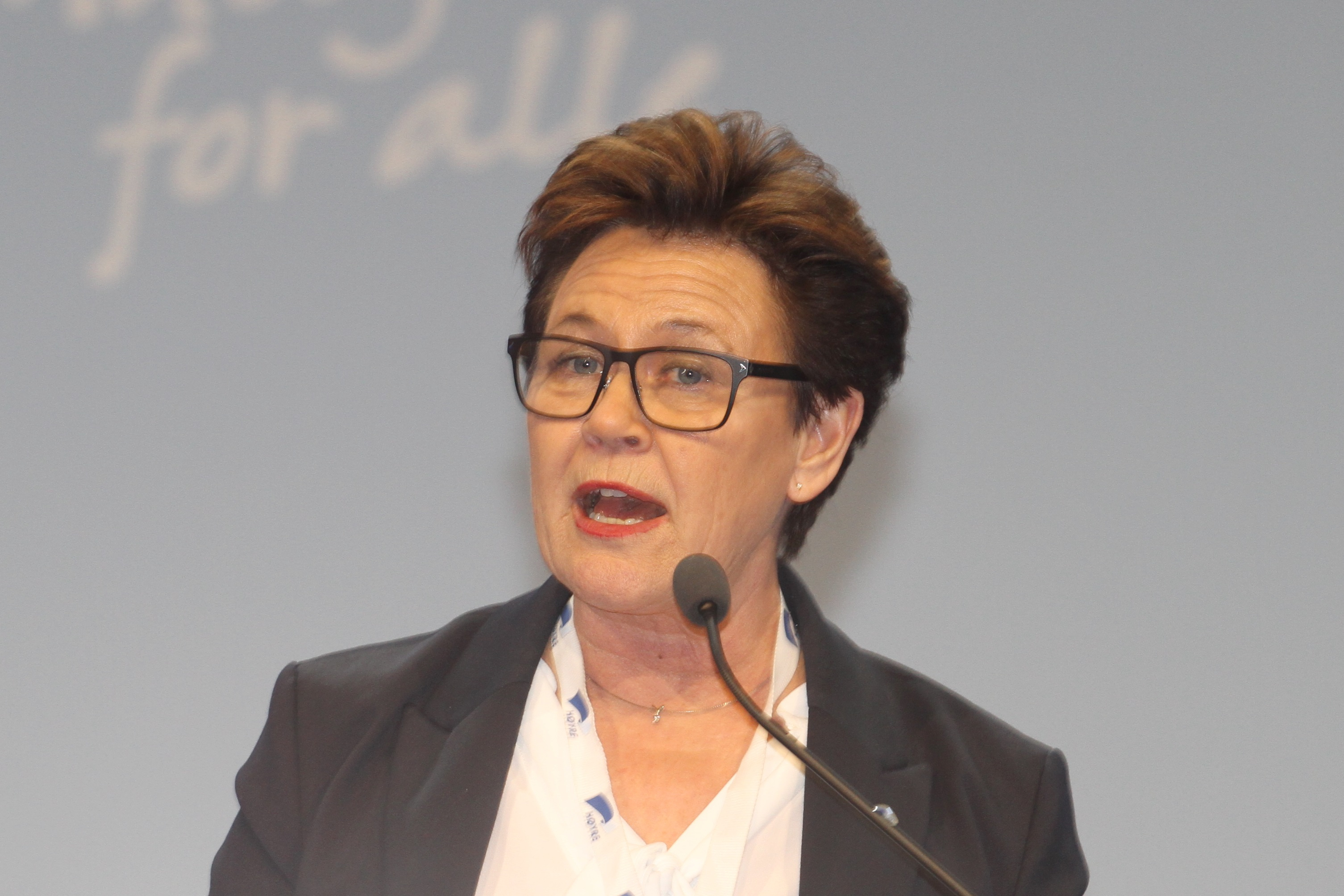
Ingunn Foss

Ingunn Foss (born 7 February 1960) is a Norwegian politician for the Conservative Party.

She is Member of Parliament (Stortinget) for Vest-Agder County since 2013. She served as a deputy representative to the Norwegian Parliament from Vest-Agder during the term 2005–2009.

On the local level, she was first elected to the municipal council of Lyngdal Municipality in 2003, and served as deputy mayor. She was the mayor of Lyngdal Municipality since 2007-2013.
