= Stian Storbukås =

Norwegian politician

Member of the Storting
- Incumbent
- Assumed office 1 October 2025
- Constituency: Vest-Agder

Personal details
- Born: 4 June 1975 (age 51)
- Party: Progress
- Education: University of Agder

Stian Storbukås (born 1978) is a Norwegian politician for the Progress Party (FrP). He has been a local politician in Kristiansand municipality and was elected to the Storting for Vest-Agder in 2025.

Storbukås completed his teacher training in 2002 and a bachelor's degree in IT/information systems from 2013, both from the University of Agder. He was elected to the Kristiansand municipal council in 1999, and served on the county council for Vest-Agder from 1999–2007.
