= Anja Ninasdotter Abusland =

Norwegian politician (born 1995)

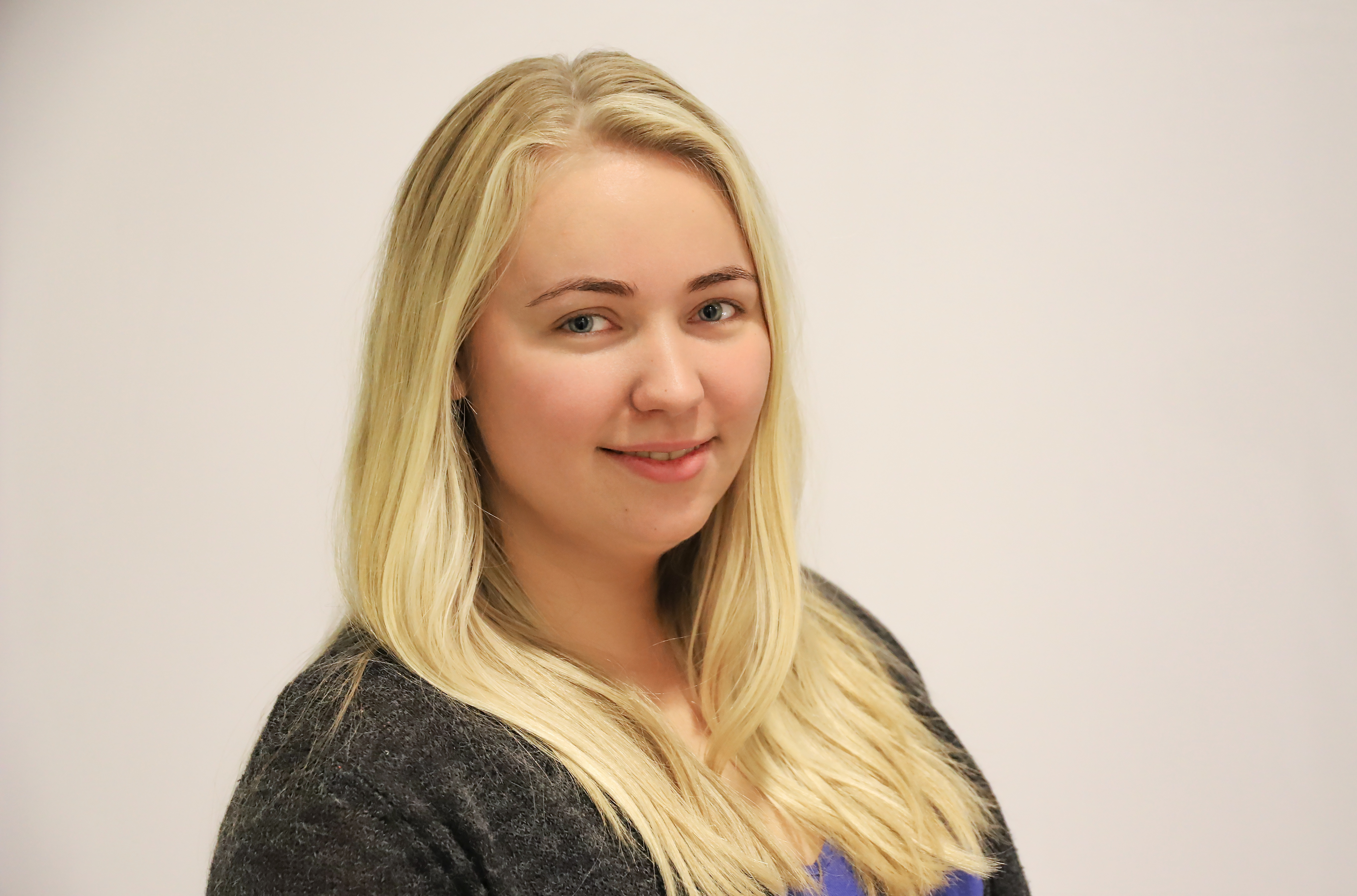

Member of the Storting
- In office 1 October 2021 – 30 September 2025
- Constituency: Vest-Agder

Personal details
- Born: 25 November 1995 (age 30)
- Party: Centre
- Occupation: Politician

Anja Ninasdotter Abusland (born 25 November 1995) is a Norwegian politician for the Centre Party (Sp). She was a member of the Storting between 2021 and 2025.

== Political career ==
Abusland was a member of the municipal council of Songdalen Municipality from 2015 to 2019, and of the municipal council of Kristiansand Municipality from 2019. She was elected representative to the Storting from the constituency of Vest-Agder for the period 2021–2025, for the Centre Party. In the Storting, she was a member of the Standing Committee on Labour and Social Affairs between 2021 and 2025. She did not seek re-election in the 2025 election.

== Early and personal life ==
Abusland hails from Finsland, and is educated as nurse. She gave birth to a daughter in 2021, shortly before she was elected representative to the Storting.
