= Gisle Meininger Saudland =

Norwegian politician

- Born: 8 July 1986 (age 40); Flekkefjord, Norway
- Education: University of Agder
- Occupation: Politician
- Political party: Progress Party

Gisle Meininger Saudland (born 8 July 1986) is a Norwegian politician for the Progress Party.

== Political career ==
Saudland was a deputy representative to the Storting for the period 2013–2017. He was elected representative to the Storting for the period 2017–2021 from the constituency of Vest-Agder, and re-elected in 2021.

== Early and personal life ==
Saudland was born in Flekkefjord on 8 July 1986, and is a son of economist Eivind Sveinung Saudland and dentist Dagmar Ioana Meininger.

He has a batchelor degree in social science from the University of Agder, and has worked as sales manager in Flekkefjord.
