= Marie Østensen =

Norwegian politician (born 1978)

Deputy Member of the Storting
- Incumbent
- Assumed office 1 October 2025
- Constituency: Akershus

Personal details
- Born: 30 December 1978 (age 47)
- Party: Labour

Marie Østensen (born 30 December 1978) is a Norwegian politician from the Labour Party (Ap).

She was elected deputy member to the Storting in the 2025 Norwegian parliamentary election and if both Tonje Brenna and Åsmund Aukrust were to continue in the Støre cabinet, then she would be actively meeting at the Storting. However after the election, Jonas Gahr Støre announced that Tonje Brenna would leave the cabinet in order to take over as parliamentary leader for the Labour Party at the Storting. Østensen would then instead be the No.1 subsititute for the Labour Party's six members of the Storting from Akershus for the period of 2025–2029.

== See also ==
- List of members of the Storting, 2025–2029
