= Ingelise Udjus =

Norwegian resistance member, teacher and civil servant

Ingelise Udjus (9 September 1920 – 5 December 2001) was a Norwegian resistance member, educator and civil servant.

== Biography ==
Udjus was born in Drammen and took the Candidate of Arts and Letters degree in 1946, later the pedagogical seminary in 1950. During World War II, she was active in Milorg from 1941 to 1944, and worked for the Norwegian military mission in Stockholm from 1944 to 1945.

Udjus worked as secretary-general in the People's University from 1959 to 1965, head of information at the University of Oslo from 1965 to 1979, and managing director of the Norwegian Museum Council between 1980 and 1990.

Udjus was also a board member of the International Congress of University Adult Education, sat on the Council for Adult Education (1966–1976), the UNESCO Commission from 1962 to 1976, the Norwegian-Belgian Cultural Commission and the French-Norwegian Cultural Committee. She was decorated as a Chevalier of the Ordre des Palmes Académiques.

She resided at Jar from 1957, and died in 2001 at the Bærum Hospital.
