= Kai Steffen Østensen =

Norwegian politician (born 1994)

Member of the Storting
- Incumbent
- Assumed office 1 October 2025
- Constituency: Vest-Agder

Personal details
- Born: 4 October 1994 (age 31)
- Party: Labour Party

Kai Steffen Østensen (born 4 October 1994) is a Norwegian politician who was elected member of the Storting in 2025. From 2017 to 2025, he was a deputy member of the Storting.

== Background and education ==
Østensen was born in Farsund Municipality in southern Norway. He went to Lister high-school and finished a Bachelor degree in regional planning in 2019 at the University of Agder in Kristiansand. In 2019 he was elected to the Agder county council. From 2021 to 2023 he worked as a political advisor to Ingvild Kjerkol, Minister of Health and Care Services. After leaving he worked at the Norwegian Communications Authority.

In 2024 Østensen won the top spot of the labour party nomination for parliament over Even Tonstad Sagebakken, and September 8, 2025 he was elected.

== Church of Norway ==
In 2019, Østensen, being a member of "Åpen folkekirke", was elected as the youngest ever chair of the bishops council (Bispedømmeråd) of the Diocese of Agder og Telemark. He has also been in the leadership-group of the synod of the Church of Norway (Kirkemøtet).
