= List of members of the Storting, 1954–1957 =

== Aust-Agder ==
| Name | Party | Comments |
| Magnhild Hagelia | Norwegian Labour Party | |
| Arne Leonhard Nilsen | Conservative Party of Norway | Elected through a joint list of Conservative Party of Norway/Farmers' Party |
| Bjarne Henry Henriksen | Norwegian Labour Party | |
| Arnt Jacobsen Mørland | Christian Democratic Party of Norway | Died in September 1957, replaced by Thor Martin Nilsen Sauvik. |

== Vest-Agder ==
| Name | Party | Comments |
| Ole Jørgensen | Norwegian Labour Party | |
| Bent Røiseland | Venstre (Norway) | |
| Jens Haugland | Norwegian Labour Party | |
| Sverre Walter Rostoft | Conservative Party of Norway | |
| Arne Askildsen | Christian Democratic Party of Norway | |

== Akershus ==
| Name | Party | Comments |
| Halvard Lange | Norwegian Labour Party | |
| Hartvig Svendsen | Norwegian Labour Party | |
| Hartvig Caspar Christie | Conservative Party of Norway | |
| Liv Tomter | Norwegian Labour Party | |
| Hans Borgen | Farmers’ Party | |
| Arne Torolf Strøm | Norwegian Labour Party | |
| Kristian Asdahl | Conservative Party of Norway | |

== Bergen ==
| Name | Party | Comments |
| Nils Langhelle | Norwegian Labour Party | |
| Henrik Svensen | Conservative Party of Norway | |
| Torstein Selvik | Norwegian Labour Party | |
| Arthur Sundt | Venstre (Norway) | |
| Kjell Gjøstein Aabrek | Norwegian Labour Party | |

== Buskerud ==
| Name | Party | Comments |
| Konrad Gustav Knudsen | Norwegian Labour Party | |
| Olaf Fredrik Watnebryn | Norwegian Labour Party | |
| Bernt Ingvaldsen | Conservative Party of Norway | |
| Astrid Skare | Norwegian Labour Party | |
| Olaf Sørensen | Norwegian Labour Party | |
| Hans Oskar Evju | Farmers’ Party | |
| Olaf Knudson | Conservative Party of Norway | |

== Finnmark ==
| Name | Party | Comments |
| Johannes Olai Olsen | Norwegian Labour Party | |
| Harry Johan Olai Klippenvåg | Norwegian Labour Party | |
| Gotfred Johan Hølvold | Norwegian Communist Party | |
| Erling Johannes Norvik | Conservative Party of Norway | |

== Hedmark ==
| Name | Party | Comments |
| Kristian Fjeld | Norwegian Labour Party | |
| Harald Johan Løbak | Norwegian Labour Party | |
| Reidar Magnus Aamo | Norwegian Labour Party | |
| Einar Frogner | Farmers’ Party | Died in July 1955, was replaced by Karen Grønn-Hagen. |
| Paul Oskar Lindberget | Norwegian Labour Party | |
| Alv Kjøs | Conservative Party of Norway | |
| Emil Løvlien | Norwegian Communist Party | |
| Otto Dahl | Norwegian Labour Party | |

== Hordaland ==
| Name | Party | Comments |
| Jakob Martin Pettersen | Norwegian Labour Party | |
| Torstein Kvamme | Christian Democratic Party of Norway | |
| Isak Larsson Flatabø | Norwegian Labour Party | |
| Knut Ytre-Arne | Venstre (Norway) | |
| Chr. L. Holm | Conservative Party of Norway | |
| Ola Olsen | Christian Democratic Party of Norway | |
| Knut Severin Jakobsen Vik | Norwegian Labour Party | |
| Ola Høyland | Farmers’ Party | |
| Olav Hordvik | Venstre (Norway) | |
| Hjalmar Olai Storeide | Norwegian Labour Party | |

== Møre and Romsdal ==
| Name | Party | Comments |
| Ulrik Olsen | Norwegian Labour Party | Appointed to Cabinet. Was replaced by Peter Kjeldseth Moe and later, when Moe replaced Alvestad instead, Arnfinn Severin Roald. |
| Einar Hareide | Christian Democratic Party of Norway | |
| Anton Ludvik Alvestad | Norwegian Labour Party | Died in July 1956. Was replaced by Peter Kjeldseth Moe. |
| Knut Olaf Andreasson Strand | Venstre (Norway) | |
| Olav Rasmussen Langeland | Farmers’ Party | |
| Knut Toven | Christian Democratic Party of Norway | |
| Ivar Kornelius Eikrem | Norwegian Labour Party | |
| Sverre Bernhard Nybø | Conservative Party of Norway | |
| Bjarne Fjærtoft | Venstre (Norway) | |
| Anders Sæterøy | Norwegian Labour Party | |

== Nordland ==
| Name | Party | Comments |
| Reidar Carlsen | Norwegian Labour Party | |
| Jens Olai Steffensen | Norwegian Labour Party | |
| Alfred Sigurd Nilsen | Norwegian Labour Party | |
| Håkon Kyllingmark | Conservative Party of Norway | |
| Parelius Hjalmar Bang Berntsen | Norwegian Labour Party | |
| Hans Berg | Christian Democratic Party of Norway | |
| Kolbjørn Sigurd Verner Varmann | Norwegian Labour Party | |
| Erling Johan Vindenes | Venstre (Norway) | |
| Jonas Enge | Norwegian Labour Party | |
| Erling Engan | Farmers’ Party | |
| Lauritz Johan Riise | Conservative Party of Norway | |
| Sigurd Lund Hamran | Norwegian Labour Party | |

== Oppland ==
| Name | Party | Comments |
| Lars Magnus Moen | Norwegian Labour Party | |
| Olav Meisdalshagen | Norwegian Labour Party | |
| Anton Ryen | Farmers’ Party | |
| Martin Smeby | Norwegian Labour Party | |
| Gunnar Kalrasten | Norwegian Labour Party | |
| Trond Halvorsen Wirstad | Farmers’ Party | |
| Anders Hove | Norwegian Labour Party | |

== Oslo ==
| Name | Party | Comments |
| Einar Gerhardsen | Norwegian Labour Party | |
| Carl Joachim Hambro | Conservative Party of Norway | |
| Rakel Seweriin | Norwegian Labour Party | |
| Berte Rognerud | Conservative Party of Norway | |
| Finn Moe | Norwegian Labour Party | |
| Herman Smitt Ingebretsen | Conservative Party of Norway | |
| Trygve Bratteli | Norwegian Labour Party | |
| Erling Petersen | Conservative Party of Norway | |
| Lars Samuel Myhrer Evensen | Norwegian Labour Party | |
| Helge Seip | Venstre (Norway) | |
| Johan Strand Johansen | Norwegian Communist Party | |
| Erling Wikborg | Christian Democratic Party of Norway | |
| Reidar Bruu | Conservative Party of Norway | |

== Rogaland ==
| Name | Party | Comments |
| Ivar Kristiansen Hognestad | Norwegian Labour Party | |
| Lars Ramndal | Venstre (Norway) | |
| Trond Hegna | Norwegian Labour Party | |
| Kjell Bondevik | Christian Democratic Party of Norway | |
| Ole Bergesen | Conservative Party of Norway | |
| Lars Elisæus Vatnaland | Farmers’ Party | |
| Jakob Martinus Remseth | Norwegian Labour Party | |
| Paul Ingebretsen | Venstre (Norway) | |
| Endre Kristian Vestvik | Christian Democratic Party of Norway | Died in March 1956. Was replaced by Peder Ree Pedersen. |
| Peter Torleivson Molaug | Conservative Party of Norway | |

== Sogn and Fjordane ==
| Name | Party | Comments |
| Einar Magnus Stavang | Norwegian Labour Party | |
| Per Severin Hjermann | Farmers’ Party | |
| Anders Johanneson Bøyum | Venstre (Norway) | Vararepresentant Johnny Bakke |
| Hans Karolus Ommedal | Christian Democratic Party of Norway | |
| Ivar Jacobsen Norevik | Norwegian Labour Party | |

== Telemark ==
| Name | Party | Comments |
| Olav Aslakson Versto | Norwegian Labour Party | |
| Sverre Offenberg Løberg | Norwegian Labour Party | |
| Harald Selås | Norwegian Labour Party | |
| Neri Valen | Venstre (Norway) | Died in January 1954. Replaced by Ketil Skogen and then Torkell Tande. |
| Jørgen Grave | Christian Democratic Party of Norway | |
| Eigil Olaf Liane | Norwegian Labour Party | |

== Troms ==
| Name | Party | Comments |
| Peder Nikolai Leier Jacobsen | Norwegian Labour Party | |
| Ingvald Johannes Jaklin | Norwegian Labour Party | |
| Hans Nikolai Stavrand | Venstre (Norway) | |
| Nils Kristen Jacobsen | Norwegian Labour Party | |
| Frithjov Meier Vik | Conservative Party of Norway | |
| Bjarne Daniel Solli | Norwegian Labour Party | |

== Nord-Trøndelag ==
| Name | Party | Comments |
| Johan Wiik | Norwegian Labour Party | |
| Gunvald Engelstad | Norwegian Labour Party | |
| Jon Leirfall | Farmers’ Party | |
| Leif Granli | Norwegian Labour Party | |
| Olav Benum | Venstre (Norway) | |
| Inge Einarsen Bartnes | Farmers’ Party | |

== Sør-Trøndelag ==
| Name | Party | Comments |
| Amund Rasmussen Skarholt | Norwegian Labour Party | |
| Håkon Johnsen | Norwegian Labour Party | |
| Mons Arntsen Løvset | Conservative Party of Norway | |
| Paul Martin Dahlø | Norwegian Labour Party | |
| Lars Sæter | Christian Democratic Party of Norway | |
| Per Borten | Farmers’ Party | |
| Reidar Andreas Lyseth | Norwegian Labour Party | |
| Harald Houge Torp | Conservative Party of Norway | |
| Oddmund Hoel | Venstre (Norway) | |
| Johan Sigurd Karlsen | Norwegian Labour Party | |

== Vestfold ==
| Name | Party | Comments |
| Oscar Fredrik Torp | Norwegian Labour Party | |
| Claudia Olsen | Conservative Party of Norway | |
| Torgeir Andreas Berge | Norwegian Labour Party | |
| Sigurd Lersbryggen | Conservative Party of Norway | |
| Reidar Strømdahl | Norwegian Labour Party | |
| Johan Andersen | Norwegian Labour Party | |
| Johan Møller Warmedal | Conservative Party of Norway | |

== Østfold ==
| Name | Party | Comments |
| Nils Hønsvald | Norwegian Labour Party | |
| Karl Henry Karlsen | Norwegian Labour Party | |
| Erling Fredriksfryd | Conservative Party of Norway | |
| Klara Amalie Skoglund | Norwegian Labour Party | |
| Asbjørn Solberg | Christian Democratic Party of Norway | |
| Henry Jacobsen | Norwegian Labour Party | |
| Wilhelm Engel Bredal | Farmers’ Party | |
| Arthur Arntzen | Norwegian Labour Party | |
