= List of members of the Storting, 1958–1961 =

List of all the members of the Storting in the period 1958 to 1961. The list includes all those initially elected to Storting.

== Aust-Agder ==
| Name | Party | Comments |
| Magnhild Hagelia | Norwegian Labour Party | |
| Bjarne Henry Henriksen | Norwegian Labour Party | |
| Alfred Thommesen | Conservative Party of Norway | |
| Birger Breivik | Christian Democratic Party of Norway | |

== Vest-Agder ==
| Name | Party | Comments |
| Jens Haugland | Norwegian Labour Party | |
| Bent Røiseland | Venstre | |
| Ole Jørgensen | Norwegian Labour Party | |
| Trygve Haugeland | Farmers' Party | |
| Kaare Steel Groos | Conservative Party of Norway | |

== Akershus ==
| Name | Party | Comments |
| Halvard Lange | Norwegian Labour Party | |
| Hartvig Svendsen | Norwegian Labour Party | |
| Hartvig Caspar Christie | Conservative Party of Norway | Died in March 1959. Was replaced by Dagny Fridrichsen. |
| Liv Tomter | Norwegian Labour Party | |
| John Lyng | Conservative Party of Norway | |
| Arne Torolf Strøm | Norwegian Labour Party | |
| Hans Borgen | Farmers' Party | |

== Bergen ==
| Name | Party | Comments |
| Nils Langhelle | Norwegian Labour Party | |
| Henrik Svensen | Conservative Party of Norway | |
| Torstein Selvik | Norwegian Labour Party | |
| Gunnar Garbo | Venstre | |
| Ragnvald Mikal Andersen | Norwegian Labour Party | |

== Buskerud ==
| Name | Party | Comments |
| Olaf Fredrik Watnebryn | Norwegian Labour Party | |
| Ragnar Karl Viktor Christiansen | Norwegian Labour Party | |
| Bernt Ingvaldsen | Conservative Party of Norway | |
| Guri Johannessen | Norwegian Labour Party | |
| Gunnar Mykstu | Norwegian Labour Party | |
| Botolv Bråtalien | Farmers' Party | |
| Olaf Knudson | Conservative Party of Norway | |

== Finnmark ==
| Name | Party | Comments |
| Johannes Olai Olsen | Norwegian Labour Party | |
| Harry Johan Olai Klippenvåg | Norwegian Labour Party | |
| Erling Johannes Norvik | Conservative Party of Norway | Elected through a joint list of Conservative Party of Norway/Venstre (Norway) |
| Harald Nicolai Samuelsberg | Norwegian Labour Party | |

== Hedmark ==
| Name | Party | Comments |
| Kristian Fjeld | Norwegian Labour Party | |
| Harald Johan Løbak | Norwegian Labour Party | |
| Reidar Magnus Aamo | Norwegian Labour Party | |
| Ole Rømer Aagaard Sandberg | Farmers' Party | |
| Paul Oskar Lindberget | Norwegian Labour Party | |
| Alv Kjøs | Conservative Party of Norway | |
| Otto Dahl | Norwegian Labour Party | |
| Emil Løvlien | Norwegian Communist Party | Last representative from his party |

== Hordaland ==
| Name | Party | Comments |
| Jakob Martin Pettersen | Norwegian Labour Party | |
| Torstein Kvamme | Christian Democratic Party of Norway | |
| Isak Larsson Flatabø | Norwegian Labour Party | |
| Knut Ytre-Arne | Venstre | |
| Chr. L. Holm | Conservative Party of Norway | |
| Lars Leiro | Farmers' Party | |
| Knut Severin Jakobsen Vik | Norwegian Labour Party | |
| Ola Olsen | Christian Democratic Party of Norway | |
| Olav Hordvik | Venstre | |
| Hjalmar Olai Storeide | Norwegian Labour Party | |

== Møre and Romsdal ==
| Name | Party | Comments |
| Ulrik Olsen | Norwegian Labour Party | |
| Einar Hareide | Christian Democratic Party of Norway | |
| Peter Kjeldseth Moe | Norwegian Labour Party | |
| Bjarne Fjærtoft | Venstre | |
| Olav Rasmussen Langeland | Farmers' Party | |
| Ivar Kornelius Eikrem | Norwegian Labour Party | |
| Knut Toven | Christian Democratic Party of Norway | |
| Sverre Bernhard Nybø | Conservative Party of Norway | |
| Sivert Todal | Venstre | |
| Anders Sæterøy | Norwegian Labour Party | |

== Nordland ==
| Name | Party | Comments |
| Kolbjørn Sigurd Verner Varmann | Norwegian Labour Party | |
| Reidar Carlsen | Norwegian Labour Party | |
| Parelius Hjalmar Bang Berntsen | Norwegian Labour Party | |
| Håkon Kyllingmark | Conservative Party of Norway | |
| Sigurd Lund Hamran | Norwegian Labour Party | |
| Hans Berg | Christian Democratic Party of Norway | |
| Erling Engan | Farmers' Party | |
| Jonas Enge | Norwegian Labour Party | |
| Harald Warholm | Conservative Party of Norway | |
| Peter Ovald Reinsnes | Norwegian Labour Party | |
| Erling Johan Vindenes | Venstre | |
| Margith Johanne Munkebye | Norwegian Labour Party | |

== Oppland ==
| Name | Party | Comments |
| Olav Meisdalshagen | Norwegian Labour Party | |
| Oskar Skogly | Norwegian Labour Party | |
| Trond Halvorsen Wirstad | Farmers' Party | |
| Gunnar Kalrasten | Norwegian Labour Party | |
| Thorstein Treholt | Norwegian Labour Party | |
| Guttorm Granum | Conservative Party of Norway | |
| Einar Hovdhaugen | Farmers' Party | |

== Oslo ==
| Name | Party | Comments |
| Einar Gerhardsen | Norwegian Labour Party | |
| Berte Rognerud | Conservative Party of Norway | |
| Konrad Mathias Nordahl | Norwegian Labour Party | |
| Erling Petersen | Conservative Party of Norway | |
| Rakel Seweriin | Norwegian Labour Party | |
| Reidar Bruu | Conservative Party of Norway | |
| Finn Moe | Norwegian Labour Party | |
| Kåre Willoch | Conservative Party of Norway | |
| Trygve Bratteli | Norwegian Labour Party | |
| Per Lønning | Conservative Party of Norway | |
| Aase Lionæs | Norwegian Labour Party | |
| Helge Seip | Venstre | |
| Erling Wikborg | Christian Democratic Party of Norway | |

== Rogaland ==
| Name | Party | Comments |
| Trond Hegna | Norwegian Labour Party | |
| Lars Ramndal | Venstre | |
| Jakob Martinus Remseth | Norwegian Labour Party | |
| Kjell Bondevik | Christian Democratic Party of Norway | |
| Ole Bergesen | Conservative Party of Norway | |
| Lars Elisæus Vatnaland | Farmers' Party | |
| Sunniva Hakestad Møller | Norwegian Labour Party | |
| Paul Ingebretsen | Venstre | |
| Karl J. Brommeland | Christian Democratic Party of Norway | |
| Peter Torleivson Molaug | Conservative Party of Norway | |

== Sogn and Fjordane ==
| Name | Party | Comments |
| Einar Magnus Stavang | Norwegian Labour Party | |
| Per Severin Hjermann | Farmers' Party | |
| Anders Johanneson Bøyum | Venstre | |
| Hans Offerdal | Norwegian Labour Party | |
| Hans Karolus Ommedal | Christian Democratic Party of Norway | |

== Telemark ==
| Name | Party | Comments |
| Olav Aslakson Versto | Norwegian Labour Party | |
| Sverre Offenberg Løberg | Norwegian Labour Party | |
| Halvor Bunkholt | Farmers' Party | Elected on a joint list of the Conservative Party of Norway and Farmers' Party |
| Harald Selås | Norwegian Labour Party | |
| Torkell Tande | Venstre | |
| Eigil Olaf Liane | Norwegian Labour Party | |

== Troms ==
| Name | Party | Comments |
| Peder Nikolai Leier Jacobsen | Norwegian Labour Party | |
| Ingvald Johannes Jaklin | Norwegian Labour Party | |
| Nils Kristen Jacobsen | Norwegian Labour Party | |
| Frithjov Meier Vik | Conservative Party of Norway | |
| Hans Nikolai Stavrand | Venstre | |
| Bjarne Daniel Solli | Norwegian Labour Party | |

== Nord-Trøndelag ==
| Name | Party | Comments |
| Gustav Adolf Sjaastad | Norwegian Labour Party | |
| Jon Leirfall | Farmers' Party | |
| Gunvald Engelstad | Norwegian Labour Party | |
| Leif Granli | Norwegian Labour Party | |
| Olav Benum | Venstre | |
| Inge Einarsen Bartnes | Farmers' Party | |

== Sør-Trøndelag ==
| Name | Party | Comments |
| Nils Kristian Lysø | Norwegian Labour Party | |
| Håkon Johnsen | Norwegian Labour Party | |
| Mons Arntsen Løvset | Conservative Party of Norway | |
| Johan Sigurd Karlsen | Norwegian Labour Party | |
| Lars Sæter | Christian Democratic Party of Norway | |
| Per Borten | Farmers' Party | |
| Iver Johan Unsgård | Norwegian Labour Party | |
| Otto Lyng | Conservative Party of Norway | |
| Andreas Wormdahl | Norwegian Labour Party | |
| Oddmund Hoel | Venstre | |

== Vestfold ==
| Name | Party | Comments |
| Oscar Fredrik Torp | Norwegian Labour Party | Died in 1958. Was replaced by Gunvor Katharina Eker. |
| Claudia Olsen | Conservative Party of Norway | Elected through a joint list of Conservative Party of Norway/Farmers' Party |
| Torgeir Andreas Berge | Norwegian Labour Party | |
| Johan Møller Warmedal | Conservative Party of Norway | Elected through a joint list of Conservative Party of Norway/Farmers' Party |
| Reidar Strømdahl | Norwegian Labour Party | |
| Bjarne Støtvig | Conservative Party of Norway | Elected through a joint list of Conservative Party of Norway/Farmers' Party |
| Johan Andersen | Norwegian Labour Party | |

== Østfold ==
| Name | Party | Comments |
| Nils Hønsvald | Norwegian Labour Party | |
| Ingvar Bakken | Norwegian Labour Party | |
| Erling Fredriksfryd | Conservative Party of Norway | |
| Henry Jacobsen | Norwegian Labour Party | |
| Asbjørn Solberg | Christian Democratic Party of Norway | |
| Martha Frederikke Johannessen | Norwegian Labour Party | |
| Arvid Johanson | Norwegian Labour Party | |
| Svenn Thorkild Stray | Conservative Party of Norway | |
