= Sør-Trøndelag (Storting constituency) =

Constituency of the Storting, the national legislature of Norway

- Åarjel-Tröndelaage
- Constituency for the Storting
- Location of Sør-Trøndelag within Norway
- Municipality: List: Åfjord; Frøya; Heim; Hitra; Holtålen; Indre Fosen; Malvik; Melhus; Midtre Gauldal; Oppdal; Orkland; Ørland; Osen; Rennebu; Rindal; Røros; Selbu; Skaun; Trondheim; Tydal
- County: Trøndelag
- Population: 351,002 (2025)
- Electorate: 258,021 (2025)
- Area: 20,257 km^{2} (2025)

Current constituency
- Created: 1921
- Seats: List: 9 (2005–present); 10 (1953–2005); 6 (1921–1953)
- Members of the Storting: List: Isak Veierud Busch (Ap); Trond Giske (Ap); Maren Grøthe (Sp); Lars Haltbrekken (SV); Henrik Kierulf (H); Hege Bae Nyholt (R); Anniken Refseth (Ap); Lill Harriet Sandaune (FrP); Kristine L. Solli (Ap); Rikard Spets (FrP)
- Created from: List: Guldalen; Inner Fosen; Orkedalen; Outer Fosen; Strinden

Sør-Trøndelag (lit. transl. South Trøndelag; Southern Sami: Åarjel-Tröndelaage) is one of the 19 multi-member constituencies of the Storting, the national legislature of Norway. The constituency was established in 1921 following the introduction of proportional representation for elections to the Storting. It consists of the municipalities of Åfjord, Frøya, Heim, Hitra, Holtålen, Indre Fosen, Malvik, Melhus, Midtre Gauldal, Oppdal, Orkland, Ørland, Osen, Rennebu, Rindal, Røros, Selbu, Skaun, Trondheim and Tydal in the county of Trøndelag. The constituency currently elects nine of the 169 members of the Storting using the open party-list proportional representation electoral system. At the 2025 parliamentary election it had 258,021 registered electors.

== Electoral system ==
Sør-Trøndelag currently elects nine of the 169 members of the Storting using the open (Note: Although technically elections to the Storting have open lists, they are in effect closed lists as a majority of those voting for a party must make changes to the lists for the changes to take effect, which has never happened since the introduction of proportional representation in 1921, and as result candidates are elected in the order submitted by the party.) party-list proportional representation electoral system. Constituency seats are allocated by the County Electoral Committee using the Modified Sainte-Laguë method. Compensatory seats (seats at large or levelling seats) are calculated based on the national vote and are allocated by the National Electoral Committee using the Modified Sainte-Laguë method at the constituency level (one for each constituency). Only parties that reach the 4% national threshold compete for compensatory seats.

== Election results ==
=== Summary ===
Election	Communists K			Reds R / RV / FMS			Socialist Left SV / SF			Labour Ap			Greens MDG			Centre Sp / Bp / L			Liberals V			Christian Democrats KrF			Conservatives H			Progress FrP / ALP		
Election	Votes	%	Seats	Votes	%	Seats	Votes	%	Seats	Votes	%	Seats	Votes	%	Seats	Votes	%	Seats	Votes	%	Seats	Votes	%	Seats	Votes	%	Seats	Votes	%	Seats
2025				12,422	5.98%	0	14,265	6.87%	1	66,378	31.98%	4	11,953	5.76%	0	14,026	6.76%	1	7,602	3.66%	0	5,184	2.50%	0	25,893	12.47%	1	41,123	19.81%	2
2021	63	0.03%	0	10,852	5.62%	0	17,635	9.13%	1	57,621	29.82%	3	9,268	4.80%	0	29,181	15.10%	2	8,435	4.37%	0	4,211	2.18%	0	31,837	16.48%	2	16,650	8.62%	1
2017				5,344	2.94%	0	14,008	7.71%	1	59,610	32.79%	4	7,082	3.90%	0	19,409	10.68%	1	7,385	4.06%	0	4,974	2.74%	0	37,719	20.75%	2	21,248	11.69%	1
2013	97	0.06%	0	1,667	0.95%	0	9,992	5.70%	0	64,351	36.70%	4	5,540	3.16%	0	11,351	6.47%	1	9,460	5.39%	0	6,562	3.74%	0	38,930	22.20%	2	23,871	13.61%	2
2009	107	0.07%	0	2,057	1.27%	0	12,852	7.91%	1	66,614	40.98%	4	834	0.51%	0	11,803	7.26%	1	5,871	3.61%	0	6,189	3.81%	0	22,587	13.90%	1	31,885	19.62%	2
2005	98	0.06%	0	1,763	1.13%	0	16,764	10.72%	1	59,837	38.27%	4	360	0.23%	0	13,228	8.46%	1	6,983	4.47%	0	7,610	4.87%	0	19,518	12.48%	1	27,786	17.77%	2
2001	101	0.07%	0	1,604	1.08%	0	23,027	15.50%	2	42,899	28.87%	3	598	0.40%	0	10,243	6.89%	1	4,972	3.35%	0	14,710	9.90%	1	26,418	17.78%	2	17,637	11.87%	1
1997	135	0.09%	0	3,426	2.25%	0	10,510	6.91%	1	58,826	38.67%	4	514	0.34%	0	14,065	9.25%	1	6,121	4.02%	0	17,072	11.22%	1	20,661	13.58%	2	18,771	12.34%	1
1993	109	0.07%	0	1,392	0.96%	0	12,947	8.89%	1	57,464	39.46%	4	402	0.28%	0	26,678	18.32%	2	5,630	3.87%	0	9,577	6.58%	1	23,505	16.14%	2	5,653	3.88%	0
1989				1,692	1.07%	0	19,098	12.11%	1	57,463	36.43%	4	701	0.44%	0	12,577	7.97%	1	5,114	3.24%	0	11,505	7.29%	1	33,476	21.23%	2	15,602	9.89%	1
1985	383	0.25%	0	1,381	0.89%	0	10,810	6.94%	1	66,969	42.99%	4				12,802	8.22%	1	4,821	3.09%	0	10,414	6.68%	1	42,326	27.17%	3	5,168	3.32%	0
1981	546	0.37%	0	1,558	1.05%	0	9,411	6.34%	1	57,483	38.73%	4				12,056	8.12%	1	7,482	5.04%	0	10,913	7.35%	1	43,453	29.28%	3	4,484	3.02%	0
1977	600	0.44%	0	1,259	0.93%	0	7,292	5.40%	0	60,173	44.55%	5				15,442	11.43%	1				19,364	14.34%	2	28,903	21.40%	2	1,740	1.29%	0
1973				654	0.51%	0	17,304	13.62%	2	47,231	37.18%	4				17,220	13.56%	1	3,785	2.98%	0	13,184	10.38%	1	21,035	16.56%	2	3,741	2.94%	0
1969	1,821	1.41%	0				4,072	3.15%	0	62,199	48.17%	5				20,963	16.24%	2	8,481	6.57%	0	10,339	8.01%	1	21,244	16.45%	2			
1965	2,738	2.24%	0				6,316	5.16%	0	55,155	45.07%	5				14,513	11.86%	1	10,194	8.33%	1	9,328	7.62%	1	24,134	19.72%	2			
1961	4,317	4.00%	0							54,244	50.25%	5				15,951	14.78%	2				10,692	9.91%	1	19,896	18.43%	2			
1957	4,228	3.96%	0							53,460	50.07%	5				11,259	10.54%	1	7,597	7.12%	1	11,486	10.76%	1	18,636	17.45%	2			
1953	6,838	6.35%	0							51,146	47.53%	5				11,001	10.22%	1	8,682	8.07%	1	11,277	10.48%	1	18,660	17.34%	2			
1949	3,335	4.59%	0							32,517	44.77%	3				10,608	14.60%	1	8,538	11.75%	0	8,712	11.99%	1	8,590	11.83%	1			
1945	4,411	7.26%	0							25,362	41.72%	3				8,006	13.17%	1	9,501	15.63%	1	7,253	11.93%	1	6,078	10.00%	0			
1936										23,005	38.91%	3				12,107	20.48%	1	12,204	20.64%	1				9,285	15.70%	1			
1933	1,293	2.62%	0							18,341	37.12%	3				11,073	22.41%	1	11,715	23.71%	1				6,776	13.71%	1			
1930	1,037	2.21%	0							12,656	26.94%	2				10,704	22.79%	1	11,666	24.83%	2				10,914	23.23%	1			
1927	1,526	4.23%	0							11,614	32.17%	2				9,211	25.51%	2	9,702	26.87%	2				3,739	10.36%	0			
1924	1,886	5.40%	0							7,655	21.91%	2				7,561	21.64%	1	10,638	30.44%	2				6,312	18.06%	1			
1921										8,434	24.91%	2				7,362	21.74%	1	9,740	28.77%	2				6,263	18.50%	1			

(Excludes compensatory seats. Figures in italics represent joint lists.)

=== Detailed ===
==== 2020s ====
===== 2025 =====
Results of the 2025 parliamentary election held on 8 September 2025:

Party		Votes	%	Seats		
Party		Votes	%	Con.	Com.	Tot.
Labour Party	Ap	66,378	31.98%	4	0	4
Progress Party	FrP	41,123	19.81%	2	0	2
Conservative Party	H	25,893	12.47%	1	0	1
Socialist Left Party	SV	14,265	6.87%	1	0	1
Centre Party	Sp	14,026	6.76%	1	0	1
Red Party	R	12,422	5.98%	0	1	1
Green Party	MDG	11,953	5.76%	0	0	0
Liberal Party	V	7,602	3.66%	0	0	0
Christian Democratic Party	KrF	5,184	2.50%	0	0	0
Pensioners' Party	PP	2,997	1.44%	0	0	0
Norway Democrats	ND	1,504	0.72%	0	0	0
Industry and Business Party	INP	1,252	0.60%	0	0	0
Generation Party	GP	1,114	0.54%	0	0	0
Peace and Justice	FOR	474	0.23%	0	0	0
Conservative	K	456	0.22%	0	0	0
DNI Party	DNI	367	0.18%	0	0	0
Welfare and Innovation Party	VIP	347	0.17%	0	0	0
Center Party	PS	224	0.11%	0	0	0
Valid votes		207,581	100.00%	9	1	10
Blank votes		1,770	0.84%			
Rejected votes – other		206	0.10%			
Total polled		209,557	81.22%			
Registered electors		258,021				

The following candidates were elected:

- Constituency seats - Isak Veierud Busch (Ap); Trond Giske (Ap); Maren Grøthe (Sp); Lars Haltbrekken (SV); Mari Holm Lønseth (H); Anniken Refseth (Ap); Lill Harriet Sandaune (FrP); Kristine L. Solli (Ap); and Rikard Spets (FrP).
- Compensatory seat - Hege Bae Nyholt (R).

===== 2021 =====
Results of the 2021 parliamentary election held on 13 September 2021:

Party		Votes	%	Seats		
Party		Votes	%	Con.	Com.	Tot.
Labour Party	Ap	57,621	29.82%	3	0	3
Conservative Party	H	31,837	16.48%	2	0	2
Centre Party	Sp	29,181	15.10%	2	0	2
Socialist Left Party	SV	17,635	9.13%	1	0	1
Progress Party	FrP	16,650	8.62%	1	0	1
Red Party	R	10,852	5.62%	0	1	1
Green Party	MDG	9,268	4.80%	0	0	0
Liberal Party	V	8,435	4.37%	0	0	0
Christian Democratic Party	KrF	4,211	2.18%	0	0	0
Pensioners' Party	PP	3,351	1.73%	0	0	0
Democrats in Norway		1,723	0.89%	0	0	0
Industry and Business Party	INP	658	0.34%	0	0	0
Center Party		442	0.23%	0	0	0
Health Party		330	0.17%	0	0	0
The Christians	PDK	305	0.16%	0	0	0
Capitalist Party		247	0.13%	0	0	0
Alliance - Alternative for Norway		216	0.11%	0	0	0
Pirate Party of Norway		212	0.11%	0	0	0
Communist Party of Norway	K	63	0.03%	0	0	0
Valid votes		193,237	100.00%	9	1	10
Blank votes		1,206	0.62%			
Rejected votes – other		307	0.16%			
Total polled		194,750	78.67%			
Registered electors		247,553				

The following candidates were elected:

- Constituency seats - Jorodd Asphjell (Ap); Sivert Bjørnstad (FrP); Heidi Greni (Sp); Lars Haltbrekken (SV); Eva Kristin Hansen (Ap); Linda Cathrine Hofstad Helleland (H); Kirsti Leirtrø (Ap); Mari Holm Lønseth (H); and Ola Borten Moe (Sp).
- Compensatory seat - Hege Bae Nyholt (R).

==== 2010s ====
===== 2017 =====
Results of the 2017 parliamentary election held on 11 September 2017:

Party		Votes	%	Seats		
Party		Votes	%	Con.	Com.	Tot.
Labour Party	Ap	59,610	32.79%	4	0	4
Conservative Party	H	37,719	20.75%	2	0	2
Progress Party	FrP	21,248	11.69%	1	0	1
Centre Party	Sp	19,409	10.68%	1	0	1
Socialist Left Party	SV	14,008	7.71%	1	0	1
Liberal Party	V	7,385	4.06%	0	1	1
Green Party	MDG	7,082	3.90%	0	0	0
Red Party	R	5,344	2.94%	0	0	0
Christian Democratic Party	KrF	4,974	2.74%	0	0	0
Pensioners' Party	PP	3,083	1.70%	0	0	0
Health Party		405	0.22%	0	0	0
Capitalist Party		368	0.20%	0	0	0
Pirate Party of Norway		361	0.20%	0	0	0
The Alliance		264	0.15%	0	0	0
The Christians	PDK	225	0.12%	0	0	0
Democrats in Norway		168	0.09%	0	0	0
Coastal Party	KP	143	0.08%	0	0	0
Valid votes		181,796	100.00%	9	1	10
Blank votes		1,171	0.64%			
Rejected votes – other		444	0.24%			
Total polled		183,411	79.03%			
Registered electors		232,067				

The following candidates were elected:

- Constituency seats - Jorodd Asphjell (Ap); Sivert Bjørnstad (FrP); Trond Giske (Ap); Heidi Greni (Sp); Lars Haltbrekken (SV); Eva Kristin Hansen (Ap); Linda Cathrine Hofstad Helleland (H); Kirsti Leirtrø (Ap); and Mari Holm Lønseth (H).
- Compensatory seat - Jon Gunnes (V).

===== 2013 =====
Results of the 2013 parliamentary election held on 8 and 9 September 2013:

Party		Votes	%	Seats		
Party		Votes	%	Con.	Com.	Tot.
Labour Party	Ap	64,351	36.70%	4	0	4
Conservative Party	H	38,930	22.20%	2	0	2
Progress Party	FrP	23,871	13.61%	2	0	2
Centre Party	Sp	11,351	6.47%	1	0	1
Socialist Left Party	SV	9,992	5.70%	0	1	1
Liberal Party	V	9,460	5.39%	0	0	0
Christian Democratic Party	KrF	6,562	3.74%	0	0	0
Green Party	MDG	5,540	3.16%	0	0	0
Red Party	R	1,667	0.95%	0	0	0
Pensioners' Party	PP	1,590	0.91%	0	0	0
Pirate Party of Norway		857	0.49%	0	0	0
The Christians	PDK	522	0.30%	0	0	0
Democrats in Norway		210	0.12%	0	0	0
Coastal Party	KP	139	0.08%	0	0	0
Christian Unity Party	KSP	129	0.07%	0	0	0
Liberal People's Party	DLF	98	0.06%	0	0	0
Communist Party of Norway	K	97	0.06%	0	0	0
Valid votes		175,366	100.00%	9	1	10
Blank votes		777	0.44%			
Rejected votes – other		227	0.13%			
Total polled		176,370	79.39%			
Registered electors		222,149				

The following candidates were elected:

- Constituency seats - Jorodd Asphjell (Ap); Sivert Bjørnstad (FrP); Trond Giske (Ap); Heidi Greni (Sp); Eva Kristin Hansen (Ap); Linda Cathrine Hofstad Helleland (H); Frank Jenssen (H); Per Sandberg (FrP); and Karianne Tung (Ap).
- Compensatory seat - Snorre Valen (SV).

==== 2000s ====
===== 2009 =====
Results of the 2009 parliamentary election held on 13 and 14 September 2009:

Party		Votes	%	Seats		
Party		Votes	%	Con.	Com.	Tot.
Labour Party	Ap	66,614	40.98%	4	0	4
Progress Party	FrP	31,885	19.62%	2	0	2
Conservative Party	H	22,587	13.90%	1	0	1
Socialist Left Party	SV	12,852	7.91%	1	0	1
Centre Party	Sp	11,803	7.26%	1	0	1
Christian Democratic Party	KrF	6,189	3.81%	0	1	1
Liberal Party	V	5,871	3.61%	0	0	0
Red Party	R	2,057	1.27%	0	0	0
Pensioners' Party	PP	1,026	0.63%	0	0	0
Green Party	MDG	834	0.51%	0	0	0
Coastal Party	KP	262	0.16%	0	0	0
Christian Unity Party	KSP	230	0.14%	0	0	0
Democrats in Norway		219	0.13%	0	0	0
Communist Party of Norway	K	107	0.07%	0	0	0
Valid votes		162,536	100.00%	9	1	10
Blank votes		698	0.43%			
Rejected votes – other		99	0.06%			
Total polled		163,333	76.37%			
Registered electors		213,863				

The following candidates were elected:

- Constituency seats - Jorodd Asphjell (Ap); Trond Giske (Ap); Gunn Karin Gjul (Ap); Eva Kristin Hansen (Ap); Linda Cathrine Hofstad Helleland (H); Tord Lien (FrP); Ola Borten Moe (Sp); Per Sandberg (FrP); and Snorre Valen (SV).
- Compensatory seat - Øyvind Håbrekke (KrF).

===== 2005 =====
Results of the 2005 parliamentary election held on 11 and 12 September 2005:

Party		Votes	%	Seats		
Party		Votes	%	Con.	Com.	Tot.
Labour Party	Ap	59,837	38.27%	4	0	4
Progress Party	FrP	27,786	17.77%	2	0	2
Conservative Party	H	19,518	12.48%	1	0	1
Socialist Left Party	SV	16,764	10.72%	1	0	1
Centre Party	Sp	13,228	8.46%	1	0	1
Christian Democratic Party	KrF	7,610	4.87%	0	1	1
Liberal Party	V	6,983	4.47%	0	0	0
Red Electoral Alliance	RV	1,763	1.13%	0	0	0
Pensioners' Party	PP	1,227	0.78%	0	0	0
Coastal Party	KP	699	0.45%	0	0	0
Green Party	MDG	360	0.23%	0	0	0
Democrats		228	0.15%	0	0	0
Christian Unity Party	KSP	176	0.11%	0	0	0
Communist Party of Norway	K	98	0.06%	0	0	0
Norwegian Republican Alliance		92	0.06%	0	0	0
Valid votes		156,369	100.00%	9	1	10
Blank votes		542	0.35%			
Rejected votes – other		112	0.07%			
Total polled		157,023	76.76%			
Registered electors		204,555				

The following candidates were elected:

- Constituency seats - Jorodd Asphjell (Ap); Børge Brende (H); Øystein Djupedal (SV); Trond Giske (Ap); Gunn Karin Gjul (Ap); Eva Kristin Hansen (Ap); Tord Lien (FrP); Ola Borten Moe (Sp); and Per Sandberg (FrP).
- Compensatory seat - Ola T. Lånke (KrF).

===== 2001 =====
Results of the 2001 parliamentary election held on 9 and 10 September 2001:

Party		Votes	%	Seats		
Party		Votes	%	Con.	Com.	Tot.
Labour Party	Ap	42,899	28.87%	3	0	3
Conservative Party	H	26,418	17.78%	2	0	2
Socialist Left Party	SV	23,027	15.50%	2	0	2
Progress Party	FrP	17,637	11.87%	1	0	1
Christian Democratic Party	KrF	14,710	9.90%	1	0	1
Centre Party	Sp	10,243	6.89%	1	0	1
Liberal Party	V	4,972	3.35%	0	0	0
Pensioners' Party	PP	2,434	1.64%	0	0	0
Coastal Party	KP	2,152	1.45%	0	0	0
Red Electoral Alliance	RV	1,604	1.08%	0	0	0
The Political Party	DPP	1,269	0.85%	0	0	0
Green Party	MDG	598	0.40%	0	0	0
Christian Unity Party	KSP	223	0.15%	0	0	0
Fatherland Party	FLP	118	0.08%	0	0	0
Norwegian People's Party	NFP	104	0.07%	0	0	0
Communist Party of Norway	K	101	0.07%	0	0	0
Social Democrats		90	0.06%	0	0	0
Valid votes		148,599	100.00%	10	0	10
Rejected votes		816	0.55%			
Total polled		149,415	75.01%			
Registered electors		199,189				

The following candidates were elected:

- Constituency seats - Børge Brende (H); Øystein Djupedal (SV); Trond Giske (Ap); Gunn Karin Gjul (Ap); Ola T. Lånke (KrF); Morten Lund (Sp); Ingvild Vaggen Malvik (SV); Michael Momyr (H); Gunhild Elise Øyangen (Ap); and Christopher Stensaker (FrP).

==== 1990s ====
===== 1997 =====
Results of the 1997 parliamentary election held on 15 September 1997:

Party		Votes	%	Seats		
Party		Votes	%	Con.	Com.	Tot.
Labour Party	Ap	58,826	38.67%	4	0	4
Conservative Party	H	20,661	13.58%	2	0	2
Progress Party	FrP	18,771	12.34%	1	0	1
Christian Democratic Party	KrF	17,072	11.22%	1	0	1
Centre Party	Sp	14,065	9.25%	1	0	1
Socialist Left Party	SV	10,510	6.91%	1	0	1
Liberal Party	V	6,121	4.02%	0	0	0
Red Electoral Alliance	RV	3,426	2.25%	0	0	0
Pensioners' Party	PP	1,530	1.01%	0	0	0
Green Party	MDG	514	0.34%	0	0	0
New Future Coalition Party	SNF	145	0.10%	0	0	0
Communist Party of Norway	K	135	0.09%	0	0	0
Fatherland Party	FLP	127	0.08%	0	0	0
Natural Law Party		123	0.08%	0	0	0
Non-Partisan Deputies	TVF	82	0.05%	0	0	0
Valid votes		152,108	100.00%	10	0	10
Rejected votes		578	0.38%			
Total polled		152,686	77.74%			
Registered electors		196,414				

The following candidates were elected:

- Constituency seats - Børge Brende (H); Øystein Djupedal (SV); Trond Giske (Ap); Gunn Karin Gjul (Ap); Ola T. Lånke (KrF); Morten Lund (Sp); Gunhild Elise Øyangen (Ap); Ola Røtvei (Ap); Christopher Stensaker (FrP); and Siri Frost Sterri (H).

===== 1993 =====
Results of the 1993 parliamentary election held on 12 and 13 September 1993:

Party		Votes	%	Seats		
Party		Votes	%	Con.	Com.	Tot.
Labour Party	Ap	57,464	39.46%	4	0	4
Centre Party	Sp	26,678	18.32%	2	0	2
Conservative Party	H	23,505	16.14%	2	0	2
Socialist Left Party	SV	12,947	8.89%	1	0	1
Christian Democratic Party	KrF	9,577	6.58%	1	0	1
Progress Party	FrP	5,653	3.88%	0	0	0
Liberal Party	V	5,630	3.87%	0	0	0
Red Electoral Alliance	RV	1,392	0.96%	0	0	0
Pensioners' Party	PP	1,155	0.79%	0	0	0
New Future Coalition Party	SNF	505	0.35%	0	0	0
Fatherland Party	FLP	432	0.30%	0	0	0
Green Party	MDG	402	0.28%	0	0	0
Natural Law Party		184	0.13%	0	0	0
Communist Party of Norway	K	109	0.07%	0	0	0
Valid votes		145,633	100.00%	10	0	10
Rejected votes		442	0.30%			
Total polled		146,075	75.00%			
Registered electors		194,755				

The following candidates were elected:

- Constituency seats - Øystein Djupedal (SV); Harald Ellefsen (H); Gunn Karin Gjul (Ap); Ulf Guttormsen (Ap); Ola T. Lånke (KrF); Morten Lund (Sp); Gunhild Elise Øyangen (Ap); Ola Røtvei (Ap); Siri Frost Sterri (H); and Tove Kari Viken (Sp).

==== 1980s ====
===== 1989 =====
Results of the 1989 parliamentary election held on 10 and 11 September 1989:

Party		Votes	%	Seats		
Party		Votes	%	Con.	Com.	Tot.
Labour Party	Ap	57,463	36.43%	4	0	4
Conservative Party	H	33,476	21.23%	2	0	2
Socialist Left Party	SV	19,098	12.11%	1	0	1
Progress Party	FrP	15,602	9.89%	1	0	1
Centre Party	Sp	12,577	7.97%	1	0	1
Christian Democratic Party	KrF	11,505	7.29%	1	0	1
Liberal Party	V	5,114	3.24%	0	0	0
County Lists for Environment and Solidarity	FMS	1,692	1.07%	0	0	0
Green Party	MDG	701	0.44%	0	0	0
Stop Immigration	SI	488	0.31%	0	0	0
Valid votes		157,716	100.00%	10	0	10
Rejected votes		299	0.19%			
Total polled		158,015	82.72%			
Registered electors		191,015				

The following candidates were elected:

- Constituency seats - Harald Ellefsen (H); Kåre Gjønnes (KrF); Ulf Guttormsen (Ap); Mary Synnøve Kvidal (Ap); Gunhild Elise Øyangen (Ap); Per Risvik (FrP); Marit Rotnes (Ap); Erik Solheim (SV); Siri Frost Sterri (H); and Tove Kari Viken (Sp).

===== 1985 =====
Results of the 1985 parliamentary election held on 8 and 9 September 1985:

Party		Party			List Alliance		
Party		Votes	%	Seats	Votes	%	Seats
Labour Party	Ap	66,969	42.99%	5	66,969	43.09%	4
Conservative Party	H	42,326	27.17%	3	42,326	27.23%	3
Centre Party	Sp	12,802	8.22%	1	12,802	8.24%	1
Socialist Left Party	SV	10,810	6.94%	1	10,810	6.96%	1
Christian Democratic Party	KrF	10,414	6.68%	0	10,753	6.92%	1
Liberal People's Party	DLF	720	0.46%	0	10,753	6.92%	1
Progress Party	FrP	5,168	3.32%	0	5,168	3.33%	0
Liberal Party	V	4,821	3.09%	0	4,821	3.10%	0
Red Electoral Alliance	RV	1,381	0.89%	0	1,381	0.89%	0
Communist Party of Norway	K	383	0.25%	0	383	0.25%	0
Valid votes		155,794	100.00%	10	155,413	100.00%	10
Rejected votes		224	0.14%				
Total polled		156,018	83.98%				
Registered electors		185,775					

As the list alliance was entitled to more seats contesting as an alliance than it was contesting as individual parties, the distribution of seats was as list alliance votes. The KrF-DLF list alliance's additional seat was allocated to the Christian Democratic Party.

The following candidates were elected: Liv Aasen (Ap); Jostein Berntsen (Ap); Harald Ellefsen (H); Kåre Gjønnes (KrF); Oddbjørn Hågård (Sp); Kjell Helland (Ap); Arent M. Henriksen (SV); Magnar G. Huseby (H); Marit Rotnes (Ap); and Siri Frost Sterri (H).

===== 1981 =====
Results of the 1981 parliamentary election held on 13 and 14 September 1981:

Party		Votes	%	Seats
Labour Party	Ap	57,483	38.73%	4
Conservative Party	H	43,453	29.28%	3
Centre Party	Sp	12,056	8.12%	1
Christian Democratic Party	KrF	10,913	7.35%	1
Socialist Left Party	SV	9,411	6.34%	1
Liberal Party	V	7,482	5.04%	0
Progress Party	FrP	4,484	3.02%	0
Red Electoral Alliance	RV	1,558	1.05%	0
Liberal People's Party	DLF	910	0.61%	0
Communist Party of Norway	K	546	0.37%	0
Free Elected Representatives		78	0.05%	0
Plebiscite Party		46	0.03%	0
Valid votes		148,420	100.00%	10
Rejected votes		161	0.11%	
Total polled		148,581	82.63%	
Registered electors		179,805		

The following candidates were elected: Liv Aasen (Ap); Jostein Berntsen (Ap); Hermund Eian (H); Jens P. Flå (KrF); Kjell Helland (Ap); Arent M. Henriksen (SV); Magnar G. Huseby (H); Marit Rotnes (Ap); Gunvor Margaret Schnitler (H); and Johan Syrstad (Sp).

==== 1970s ====
===== 1977 =====
Results of the 1977 parliamentary election held on 11 and 12 September 1977:

Party		Votes	%	Seats
Labour Party	Ap	60,173	44.55%	5
Conservative Party	H	28,903	21.40%	2
Christian Democratic Party, Liberal Party and New People's Party	KrF-V-DNF	19,364	14.34%	2
Centre Party	Sp	15,442	11.43%	1
Socialist Left Party	SV	7,292	5.40%	0
Progress Party	FrP	1,740	1.29%	0
Red Electoral Alliance	RV	1,259	0.93%	0
Communist Party of Norway	K	600	0.44%	0
Single Person's Party		149	0.11%	0
Norwegian Democratic Party		90	0.07%	0
Free Elected Representatives		64	0.05%	0
Valid votes		135,076	100.00%	10
Rejected votes		172	0.13%	
Total polled		135,248	80.83%	
Registered electors		167,332		6

The following candidates were elected: Liv Aasen (Ap); Jostein Berntsen (Ap); Roald Åsmund Bye (Ap); Odd Einar Dørum (KrF-V-DNF); Hermund Eian (H); Rolf Fjeldvær (Ap); Jens P. Flå (KrF-V-DNF); Kjell Helland (Ap); Gunvor Margaret Schnitler (H); and Johan Syrstad (Sp).

===== 1973 =====
Results of the 1973 parliamentary election held on 9 and 10 September 1973:

Party		Votes	%	Seats
Labour Party	Ap	47,231	37.18%	4
Conservative Party	H	21,035	16.56%	2
Socialist Electoral League	SV	17,304	13.62%	2
Centre Party	Sp	17,220	13.56%	1
Christian Democratic Party	KrF	13,184	10.38%	1
Liberal Party	V	3,785	2.98%	0
Anders Lange's Party	ALP	3,741	2.94%	0
New People's Party	DNF	2,550	2.01%	0
Red Electoral Alliance	RV	654	0.51%	0
Single Person's Party		147	0.12%	0
Women's Free Elected Representatives		92	0.07%	0
Norwegian Democratic Party		90	0.07%	0
Valid votes		127,033	100.00%	10
Rejected votes		209	0.16%	
Total polled		127,242	78.59%	
Registered electors		161,900		

The following candidates were elected: Liv Aasen (Ap); Per Borten (Sp); Roald Åsmund Bye (Ap); Hermund Eian (H); Jens P. Flå (KrF); Rolf Fjeldvær (Ap); Kjell Helland (Ap); Arent M. Henriksen (SV); Otto Lyng (H); and Kai Øverland (SV).

==== 1960s ====
===== 1969 =====
Results of the 1969 parliamentary election held on 7 and 8 September 1969:

Party		Votes	%	Seats
Labour Party	Ap	62,199	48.17%	5
Conservative Party	H	21,244	16.45%	2
Centre Party	Sp	20,963	16.24%	2
Christian Democratic Party	KrF	10,339	8.01%	1
Liberal Party	V	8,481	6.57%	0
Socialist People's Party	SF	4,072	3.15%	0
Communist Party of Norway	K	1,821	1.41%	0
Valid votes		129,119	100.00%	10
Rejected votes		259	0.20%	
Total polled		129,378	83.52%	
Registered electors		154,903		

The following candidates were elected: Liv Aasen (Ap); Per Borten (Sp); Roald Åsmund Bye (Ap); Hermund Eian (H); Rolf Fjeldvær (Ap); Håkon Johnsen (Ap); Arne Kielland (Ap); Otto Lyng (H); Einar Hole Moxnes (Sp); and Kristoffer Rein (KrF).

===== 1965 =====
Results of the 1965 parliamentary election held on 12 and 13 September 1965:

Party		Votes	%	Seats
Labour Party	Ap	55,155	45.07%	5
Conservative Party	H	24,134	19.72%	2
Centre Party	Sp	14,513	11.86%	1
Liberal Party	V	10,194	8.33%	1
Christian Democratic Party	KrF	9,328	7.62%	1
Socialist People's Party	SF	6,316	5.16%	0
Communist Party of Norway	K	2,738	2.24%	0
Valid votes		122,378	100.00%	10
Rejected votes		337	0.27%	
Total polled		122,715	85.75%	
Registered electors		143,112		

The following candidates were elected: Per Borten (Sp); Rolf Fjeldvær (Ap); Olav Gjærevoll (Ap); Håkon Johnsen (Ap); Otto Lyng (H); Kristoffer Rein (KrF); Martin Skaaren (H); Lars Tangvik (V); Iver Johan Unsgård (Ap); and Andreas Wormdahl (Ap).

===== 1961 =====
Results of the 1961 parliamentary election held on 11 September 1961:

Party		Votes	%	Seats
Labour Party	Ap	54,244	50.25%	5
Conservative Party	H	19,896	18.43%	2
Centre Party and Liberal Party	Sp-V	15,951	14.78%	2
Christian Democratic Party	KrF	10,692	9.91%	1
Communist Party of Norway	K	4,317	4.00%	0
Free Left Electorate's List		2,360	2.19%	0
Norwegian Social Democratic Party		478	0.44%	0
Wild Votes		3	0.00%	0
Valid votes		107,941	100.00%	10
Rejected votes		496	0.46%	
Total polled		108,437	78.68%	
Registered electors		137,826		

The following candidates were elected: Per Borten (Sp-V), 15,947 votes; Oddmund Hoel (Sp-V), 15,923 votes; Håkon Johnsen (Ap), 54,229 votes; Johan Sigurd Karlsen (Ap), 54,233 votes; Otto Lyng (H), 19,893 votes; Nils Lysø (Ap), 54,237 votes; Kristoffer Rein (KrF), 10,693 votes; Martin Skaaren (H), 19,894 votes; Iver Johan Unsgård (Ap), 54,234 votes; and Andreas Wormdahl (Ap), 54,231 votes.

==== 1950s ====
===== 1957 =====
Results of the 1957 parliamentary election held on 7 October 1957:

Party		Votes	%	Seats
Labour Party	Ap	53,460	50.07%	5
Conservative Party	H	18,636	17.45%	2
Christian Democratic Party	KrF	11,486	10.76%	1
Farmers' Party	Bp	11,259	10.54%	1
Liberal Party	V	7,597	7.12%	1
Communist Party of Norway	K	4,228	3.96%	0
Progress Party		105	0.10%	0
Wild Votes		1	0.00%	0
Valid votes		106,772	100.00%	10
Rejected votes		392	0.37%	
Total polled		107,164	78.66%	
Registered electors		136,236		

The following candidates were elected: Per Borten (Bp); Oddmund Hoel (V); Håkon Johnsen (Ap); Johan Sigurd Karlsen (Ap); Mons Arntsen Løvset (H); Otto Lyng (H); Nils Lysø (Ap); Lars Sæter (KrF); Iver Johan Unsgård (Ap); and Andreas Wormdahl (Ap).

===== 1953 =====
Results of the 1953 parliamentary election held on 12 October 1953:

Party		Votes	%	Seats
Labour Party	Ap	51,146	47.53%	5
Conservative Party	H	18,660	17.34%	2
Christian Democratic Party	KrF	11,277	10.48%	1
Farmers' Party	Bp	11,001	10.22%	1
Liberal Party	V	8,682	8.07%	1
Communist Party of Norway	K	6,838	6.35%	0
Valid votes		107,604	100.00%	10
Rejected votes		491	0.45%	
Total polled		108,095	79.75%	
Registered electors		135,541		

The following candidates were elected: Per Borten (Bp); Paul Martin Dahlø (Ap); Oddmund Hoel (V); Håkon Johnsen (Ap); Johan Sigurd Karlsen (Ap); Mons Arntsen Løvset (H); Reidar Andreas Lyseth (Ap); Lars Sæter (KrF); Amund Rasmussen Skarholt (Ap); and Harald Torp (H).

==== 1940s ====
===== 1949 =====
Results of the 1949 parliamentary election held on 10 October 1949:

Party		Votes	%	Seats
Labour Party	Ap	32,517	44.77%	3
Farmers' Party	Bp	10,608	14.60%	1
Christian Democratic Party	KrF	8,712	11.99%	1
Conservative Party	H	8,590	11.83%	1
Liberal Party	V	8,538	11.75%	0
Communist Party of Norway	K	3,335	4.59%	0
Society Party	Samfp	335	0.46%	0
Valid votes		72,635	100.00%	6
Rejected votes		401	0.55%	
Total polled		73,036	81.02%	
Registered electors		90,150		

The following candidates were elected: Per Almaas (Ap); Per Borten (Bp); Paul Martin Dahlø (Ap); Mons Arntsen Løvset (H); Amund Rasmussen Skarholt (Ap); and Ingvald Tøndel (KrF).

===== 1945 =====
Results of the 1945 parliamentary election held on 8 October 1945:

Party		Party			List Alliance		
Party		Votes	%	Seats	Votes	%	Seats
Labour Party	Ap	25,362	41.72%	3	25,362	41.72%	3
Liberal Party	V	9,501	15.63%	1	9,501	15.63%	1
Farmers' Party	Bp	8,006	13.17%	1	14,081	23.16%	1
Conservative Party	H	6,078	10.00%	0	14,081	23.16%	1
Christian Democratic Party	KrF	7,253	11.93%	1	7,253	11.93%	1
Communist Party of Norway	K	4,411	7.26%	0	4,411	7.26%	0
New Norway	NN	185	0.30%	0	185	0.30%	0
Wild Votes		1	0.00%	0	1	0.00%	0
Valid votes		60,797	100.00%	6	60,794	100.00%	6
Rejected votes		383	0.63%				
Total polled		61,180	73.91%				
Registered electors		82,779					

As the list alliance was not entitled to more seats contesting as an alliance than it was contesting as individual parties, the distribution of seats was as party votes.

The following candidates were elected: Paul Martin Dahlø (Ap); Johan Nygaardsvold (Ap); Amund Rasmussen Skarholt (Ap); Ingvald Svinsås-Lo (V); Ingvald Tøndel (KrF); and Nils Trædal (Bp).

==== 1930s ====
===== 1936 =====
Results of the 1936 parliamentary election held on 19 October 1936:

Party		Party			List Alliance		
Party		Votes	%	Seats	Votes	%	Seats
Labour Party	Ap	23,005	38.91%	3	23,005	38.92%	3
Liberal Party	V	12,204	20.64%	1	12,204	20.65%	1
Farmers' Party	Bp	12,107	20.48%	1	21,374	36.16%	2
Conservative Party	H	9,285	15.70%	1	21,374	36.16%	2
Norwegian Fishermen's Party	F	1,124	1.90%	0	1,124	1.90%	0
Society Party	Samfp	1,060	1.79%	0	1,060	1.79%	0
Nasjonal Samling	NS	343	0.58%	0	343	0.58%	0
Valid votes		59,128	100.00%	6	59,110	100.00%	6
Rejected votes		270	0.45%				
Total polled		59,398	82.93%				
Registered electors		71,624					

As the list alliance was not entitled to more seats contesting as an alliance than it was contesting as individual parties, the distribution of seats was as party votes.

The following candidates were elected: Johan Olaus Olsen Asmundvaag (H); Martin Handberg (Bp); Johan Nygaardsvold (Ap); Kristian Ramsvik (V); Adolf Salbubæk (Ap); and Amund Rasmussen Skarholt (Ap).

===== 1933 =====
Results of the 1933 parliamentary election held on 16 October 1933:

Party		Party			List Alliance		
Party		Votes	%	Seats	Votes	%	Seats
Labour Party	Ap	18,341	37.12%	3	18,341	37.14%	3
Liberal Party	V	11,715	23.71%	1	11,715	23.72%	1
Farmers' Party	Bp	11,073	22.41%	1	17,825	36.09%	2
Conservative Party	H	6,776	13.71%	1	17,825	36.09%	2
Communist Party of Norway	K	1,293	2.62%	0	1,293	2.62%	0
Society Party	Samfp	216	0.44%	0	216	0.44%	0
Valid votes		49,414	100.00%	6	49,390	100.00%	6
Rejected votes		242	0.49%				
Total polled		49,656	73.41%				
Registered electors		67,638					

As the list alliance was not entitled to more seats contesting as an alliance than it was contesting as individual parties, the distribution of seats was as party votes.

The following candidates were elected: Johan Olaus Olsen Asmundvaag (H); Martin Handberg (Bp); Simon Leinum (V); Johan Nygaardsvold (Ap); Adolf Salbubæk (Ap); and Amund Rasmussen Skarholt (Ap).

===== 1930 =====
Results of the 1930 parliamentary election held on 20 October 1930:

Party		Votes	%	Seats
Labour Party	Ap	12,656	26.94%	2
Liberal Party	V	11,666	24.83%	2
Conservative Party	H	10,914	23.23%	1
Farmers' Party	Bp	10,704	22.79%	1
Communist Party of Norway	K	1,037	2.21%	0
Valid votes		46,977	100.00%	6
Rejected votes		228	0.48%	
Total polled		47,205	74.05%	
Registered electors		63,744		

The following candidates were elected: Johan Olaus Olsen Asmundvaag (H); Johan Falkberget (Ap); Martin Handberg (Bp); Simon Leinum (V); Anders Nilsen Næsset (V); and Johan Nygaardsvold (Ap).

==== 1920s ====
===== 1927 =====
Results of the 1927 parliamentary election held on 17 October 1927:

Party		Votes	%	Seats
Labour Party	Ap	11,614	32.17%	2
Liberal Party	V	9,702	26.87%	2
Farmers' Party	Bp	9,211	25.51%	2
Conservative Party and Free-minded Liberal Party	H-FV	3,739	10.36%	0
Communist Party of Norway	K	1,526	4.23%	0
Fishermen–Liberal People's Party	F-LF	308	0.85%	0
Wild Votes		2	0.01%	0
Valid votes		36,102	100.00%	6
Rejected votes		436	1.19%	
Total polled		36,538	59.77%	
Registered electors		61,135		

The following candidates were elected: Martin Handberg (Bp); Peder Næsset (Bp); Johan Nygaardsvold (Ap); Svend Larsen Skaardal (Ap); Johan Stinessen (V); and John Wolden (V).

===== 1924 =====
Results of the 1924 parliamentary election held on 21 October 1924:

Party		Votes	%	Seats
Liberal Party	V	10,638	30.44%	2
Labour Party	Ap	7,655	21.91%	2
Farmers' Party	Bp	7,561	21.64%	1
Conservative Party and Free-minded Liberal Party	H-FV	6,312	18.06%	1
Communist Party of Norway	K	1,886	5.40%	0
Social Democratic Labour Party of Norway	S	894	2.56%	0
Valid votes		34,946	100.00%	6
Rejected votes		375	1.06%	
Total polled		35,321	60.42%	
Registered electors		58,456		

The following candidates were elected: Johannes Berg (H-FV); Ingebrigt Huus (Bp); Johan Nygaardsvold (Ap); Benjamin Olsen Schei (V); Svend Larsen Skaardal (Ap); and John Wolden (V).

===== 1921 =====
Results of the 1921 parliamentary election held on 24 October 1921:

Party		Votes	%	Seats
Liberal Party	V	9,740	28.77%	2
Labour Party	Ap	8,434	24.91%	2
Norwegian Farmers' Association	L	7,362	21.74%	1
Conservative Party and Free-minded Liberal Party	H-FV	6,263	18.50%	1
Fishermen and Smallholder Party		1,166	3.44%	0
Social Democratic Labour Party of Norway	S	852	2.52%	0
Wild Votes		40	0.12%	0
Valid votes		33,857	100.00%	6
Rejected votes		462	1.35%	
Total polled		34,319	60.51%	
Registered electors		56,720		

The following candidates were elected: Johannes Berg (H-FV); Ingebrigt Huus (L); Johan Nygaardsvold (Ap); Benjamin Olsen Schei (V); Svend Larsen Skaardal (Ap); and John Wolden (V).
