= List of members of the Storting, 1985–1989 =

List of all members of the Storting in the period 1985 to 1989. The list includes all those initially elected to the Storting.

There were a total of 157 representatives, distributed among the parties: 71 to Norwegian Labour Party, 50 to Conservative Party of Norway, 16 to Christian Democratic Party of Norway, 12 to Centre Party (Norway), 6 to Socialist Left Party and 2 to Progress Party (Norway)

== Aust-Agder ==
Name	Party	Comments/Suppleant representatives
Brit Hoel	Norwegian Labour Party	
Astrid Gjertsen	Conservative Party of Norway	
Asbjørn Andersen	Norwegian Labour Party	
Helga Haugen	Christian Democratic Party of Norway	

== Vest-Agder ==
Name	Party	Comments/Suppleant representatives
Tore Austad	Conservative Party of Norway	
Sigurd Verdal	Norwegian Labour Party	
Harald Synnes	Christian Democratic Party of Norway	
Ole Frithjof Klemsdal	Conservative Party of Norway	
Aud Blattmann	Norwegian Labour Party	

== Akershus ==
Name	Party	Comments/Suppleant representatives
Jo Benkow	Conservative Party of Norway	
Reiulf Steen	Norwegian Labour Party	
Rolf Presthus	Conservative Party of Norway	Appointed to the Cabinet until May 1986, and died in January 1988. Was replaced by Eva R. Finstad.
Helen Marie Bøsterud	Norwegian Labour Party	
Kaci Kullmann Five	Conservative Party of Norway	
Terje Granerud	Norwegian Labour Party	
Anne Enger Lahnstein	Centre Party (Norway)	
Carl Fredrik Lowzow	Conservative Party of Norway	
Anneliese Dørum	Norwegian Labour Party	
Jan Petersen	Conservative Party of Norway	
Tora Aasland	Socialist Left Party	
Thor-Eirik Gulbrandsen	Norwegian Labour Party	

== Buskerud ==
Name	Party	Comments/Suppleant representatives
Erik Dalheim	Norwegian Labour Party	
Mona Røkke	Conservative Party of Norway	
Kirsti Kolle Grøndahl	Norwegian Labour Party	
Hallgrim Berg	Conservative Party of Norway	
Olaf Øen	Norwegian Labour Party	
Johan Buttedahl	Centre Party (Norway)	
Aase Moløkken	Norwegian Labour Party	

== Finnmark ==
Name	Party	Comments/Suppleant representatives
Oddvar J. Majala	Norwegian Labour Party	
Oddrunn Pettersen	Norwegian Labour Party	
Steinar Eriksen	Conservative Party of Norway	
Karl Eirik Schjøtt-Pedersen	Norwegian Labour Party	

== Hedmark ==
Name	Party	Comments/Suppleant representatives
Kjell Borgen	Norwegian Labour Party	
Anne-Lise Bakken	Norwegian Labour Party	Tor Olav Blostrupmoen. Blostrupmoen served as representative after Bakken became a Cabinet member.
Johan C. Løken	Conservative Party of Norway	
Sigbjørn Johnsen	Norwegian Labour Party	
Eirin Faldet	Norwegian Labour Party	
Ragnhild Queseth Haarstad	Centre Party (Norway)	
Kjell Magne Fredheim	Norwegian Labour Party	
Magnar Sortåsløkken	Socialist Left Party	

== Hordaland ==
Name	Party	Comments/Suppleant representatives
Hallvard Bakke	Norwegian Labour Party	
Arne Skauge	Conservative Party of Norway	
Grete Knudsen	Norwegian Labour Party	
Inger-Lise Skarstein	Conservative Party of Norway	
Svein Alsaker	Christian Democratic Party of Norway	
Leiv Stensland	Norwegian Labour Party	
Arne Alsåker Spilde	Conservative Party of Norway	
Ranveig Frøiland	Norwegian Labour Party	
Nils O. Golten	Conservative Party of Norway	
Britt Harkestad	Christian Democratic Party of Norway	
Magnus Stangeland	Centre Party (Norway)	
Bjarne Kristiansen	Norwegian Labour Party	
Brita Borge	Conservative Party of Norway	
Kjellbjørg Lunde	Socialist Left Party	
Bjørn Erling Ytterhorn	Progress Party (Norway)	Died in September 1987. Was replaced by Hans J. Røsjorde.

== Møre and Romsdal ==
Name	Party	Comments/Suppleant representatives
Arve Berg	Norwegian Labour Party	
Inger Koppernæs	Conservative Party of Norway	
Kjell Magne Bondevik	Christian Democratic Party of Norway	
Mary Eide	Norwegian Labour Party	
Anders Talleraas	Conservative Party of Norway	
Rikard Olsvik	Norwegian Labour Party	
Gudmund Restad	Centre Party (Norway)	
Kjell Furnes	Christian Democratic Party of Norway	
Ingvard Sverdrup	Conservative Party of Norway	
Laila Kaland	Norwegian Labour Party	

== Nordland ==
Name	Party	Comments/Suppleant representatives
Bjarne Mørk-Eidem	Norwegian Labour Party	
Petter Thomassen	Conservative Party of Norway	
Ragna Berget Jørgensen	Norwegian Labour Party	
Finn Knutsen	Norwegian Labour Party	
Hanna Kvanmo	Socialist Left Party	
Thea Knutzen	Conservative Party of Norway	
Åshild Hauan	Norwegian Labour Party	
Inger Pedersen	Norwegian Labour Party	
Hans Svendsgård	Conservative Party of Norway	
Dag Jostein Fjærvoll	Christian Democratic Party of Norway	
Peter Angelsen	Centre Party (Norway)	
Jan-Olav Ingvaldsen	Norwegian Labour Party	

== Oppland ==
Name	Party	Comments/Suppleant representatives
Haakon Blankenborg	Norwegian Labour Party	
Berit Brørby	Norwegian Labour Party	
Harald U. Lied	Conservative Party of Norway	
Johan M. Nyland	Norwegian Labour Party	
Lars Velsand	Centre Party (Norway)	
Marie Brenden	Norwegian Labour Party	
Åge Hovengen	Norwegian Labour Party	

== Oslo ==
Name	Party	Comments/Suppleant representatives
Kåre Willoch	Conservative Party of Norway	
Gro Harlem Brundtland	Norwegian Labour Party	Prime Minister in the second cabinet Brundtland. Was replaced by Marit Nybakk until February 1987, and then Bjørn Tore Godal.
Astrid Nøklebye Heiberg	Conservative Party of Norway	
Einar Førde	Norwegian Labour Party	
Jan P. Syse	Conservative Party of Norway	
Thorbjørn Berntsen	Norwegian Labour Party	
Lars Roar Langslet	Conservative Party of Norway	
Theo Koritzinsky	Socialist Left Party	
Sissel Rønbeck	Norwegian Labour Party	Appointed to the second cabinet Brundtland. Was replaced by Bjørn Tore Godal until February 1987, and then Turid Birkeland.
Annelise Høegh	Conservative Party of Norway	
Kåre Kristiansen	Christian Democratic Party of Norway	
Per-Kristian Foss	Conservative Party of Norway	
Knut Frydenlund	Norwegian Labour Party	Appointed to the second cabinet Brundtland from 1986 to 1987, during which time he was replaced by Turid Birkeland. Died in February 1987, and was replaced by Marit Nybakk.
Carl I. Hagen	Progress Party (Norway)	
Anders C. Sjaastad	Conservative Party of Norway	

== Rogaland ==
Name	Party	Comments/Suppleant representatives
Sverre Mauritzen	Conservative Party of Norway	
Gunnar Berge	Norwegian Labour Party	
John S. Tveit	Christian Democratic Party of Norway	
Marit Løvvig	Conservative Party of Norway	
Gunn Vigdis Olsen-Hagen	Norwegian Labour Party	
Lars Storhaug	Conservative Party of Norway	
Hans Frette	Norwegian Labour Party	
Ole Gabriel Ueland	Centre Party (Norway)	
Borghild Røyseland	Christian Democratic Party of Norway	
Gunnar Fatland	Conservative Party of Norway	

== Sogn and Fjordane ==
Name	Party	Comments/Suppleant representatives
Kåre Øvregard	Norwegian Labour Party	
Lars Lefdal	Conservative Party of Norway	
Leiv Blakset	Centre Party (Norway)	
Kjell Opseth	Norwegian Labour Party	
Lars Gunnar Lie	Christian Democratic Party of Norway	

== Telemark ==
Name	Party	Comments/Suppleant representatives
Ingeborg Botnen	Norwegian Labour Party	
Jan Helge Jansen	Conservative Party of Norway	
Kjell Bohlin	Norwegian Labour Party	
Ragnhild Barland	Norwegian Labour Party	
Solveig Sollie	Christian Democratic Party of Norway	
Ingvald Godal	Conservative Party of Norway	

== Troms ==
Name	Party	Comments/Suppleant representatives
Asbjørn Sjøthun	Norwegian Labour Party	
Arnljot Norwich	Conservative Party of Norway	
Ranja Hauglid	Norwegian Labour Party	
Rolf Nilssen	Norwegian Labour Party	
Margit Hansen-Krone	Conservative Party of Norway	
Per Almar Aas	Christian Democratic Party of Norway	

== Nord-Trøndelag ==
Name	Party	Comments/Suppleant representatives
Inger Lise Gjørv	Norwegian Labour Party	
Johan J. Jakobsen	Centre Party (Norway)	
Roger Gudmundseth	Norwegian Labour Party	
Wenche Frogn Sellæg	Conservative Party of Norway	
Inge Staldvik	Norwegian Labour Party	
Reidar Due	Centre Party (Norway)	

== Sør-Trøndelag ==
Name	Party	Comments/Suppleant representatives
Liv Aasen	Norwegian Labour Party	
Magnar G. Huseby	Conservative Party of Norway	
Jostein Berntsen	Norwegian Labour Party	
Siri Frost Sterri	Conservative Party of Norway	
Kjell Helland	Norwegian Labour Party	
Marit Rotnes	Norwegian Labour Party	
Oddbjørn Hågård	Centre Party (Norway)	
Harald Ellefsen	Conservative Party of Norway	
Arent M. Henriksen	Socialist Left Party	
Kåre Gjønnes	Christian Democratic Party of Norway	

== Vestfold ==
Name	Party	Comments/Suppleant representatives
Thor Knudsen	Conservative Party of Norway	
Ernst Wroldsen	Norwegian Labour Party	
Ingrid I. Willoch	Conservative Party of Norway	
Karin Lian	Norwegian Labour Party	
Morten Steenstrup	Conservative Party of Norway	
Åge Ramberg	Christian Democratic Party of Norway	
Jørgen Kosmo	Norwegian Labour Party	

== Østfold ==
Name	Party	Comments/Suppleant representatives
Gunnar Skaug	Norwegian Labour Party	
Georg Apenes	Conservative Party of Norway	
Tom Thoresen	Norwegian Labour Party	
Sigurd Holemark	Conservative Party of Norway	
Åsa Solberg Iversen	Norwegian Labour Party	
Reidun Andreassen	Norwegian Labour Party	
Bente Bakke	Conservative Party of Norway	
Odd Steinar Holøs	Christian Democratic Party of Norway	
