= List of members of the Storting, 1977–1981 =

List of all members of the Storting in the period 1977 to 1981. The list includes all those initially elected to the Storting.

There were a total of 155 representatives, distributed among the Partyes: 76 to Norwegian Labour Party, 41 to Conservative Party of Norway, 22 to Christian Democratic Party of Norway, 12 to Centre Party (Norway), 2 to Socialist Left Party and 2 to Venstre (Norway)

== Aust-Agder ==
Name	Party	Comments/Suppleant representatives
Osmund Faremo	Norwegian Labour Party	
Johannes Vågsnes	Christian Democratic Party of Norway	Elected as part of a joint list consisting of Centre Party/[Christian Democratic Party/Venstre/Det Nye FolkePartiet.
Astrid Gjertsen	Conservative Party of Norway	
Thor Lund	Norwegian Labour Party	

== Vest-Agder ==
Name	Party	Comments/Suppleant representatives
Engly Lie	Norwegian Labour Party	
Tore Austad	Conservative Party of Norway	
Toralf Westermoen	Christian Democratic Party of Norway	
Odd Lien	Norwegian Labour Party	
Ragnar Udjus	Centre Party (Norway)	Elected as part of a joint list consisting of Centre Party/Christian Democratic Party/Venstre/Det Nye FolkePartiet.

== Akershus ==
Name	Party	Comments/Suppleant representatives
Inger Louise Valle	Norwegian Labour Party	
Jo Benkow	Conservative Party of Norway	
Thor Gystad	Norwegian Labour Party	
Rolf Presthus	Conservative Party of Norway	
Thor-Eirik Gulbrandsen	Norwegian Labour Party	
Gerd Kirste	Conservative Party of Norway	
Helen Marie Bøsterud	Norwegian Labour Party	
Carl Fredrik Lowzow	Conservative Party of Norway	
Anne-Olaug Ingeborgrud	Christian Democratic Party of Norway	
Erland Asdahl	Centre Party (Norway)	

== Buskerud ==
Name	Party	Comments/Suppleant representatives
Tor Oftedal	Norwegian Labour Party	Died in October 1980. Was replaced by Aase Moløkken.
Mona Røkke	Conservative Party of Norway	
Gunnar Thorleif Hvashovd	Norwegian Labour Party	
Kirsti Kolle Grøndahl	Norwegian Labour Party	
Hans E. Strand	Conservative Party of Norway	
Olaf Øen	Norwegian Labour Party	
Hans Torgersen	Christian Democratic Party of Norway	Elected as part of a joint list consisting of Centre Party/Christian Democratic Party/Venstre/Det Nye FolkePartiet

== Finnmark ==
Name	Party	Comments/Suppleant representatives
Valter Gabrielsen	Norwegian Labour Party	
Per A. Utsi	Norwegian Labour Party	
Thor Listau	Conservative Party of Norway	
Oddrunn Pettersen	Norwegian Labour Party	

== Hedmark ==
Name	Party	Comments/Suppleant representatives
Odvar Nordli	Norwegian Labour Party	Cabinet member and Prime Minister until February 1981. His seat was taken by Odd Torgeir Rusten
Kjell Magne Fredheim	Norwegian Labour Party	
Else Repål	Norwegian Labour Party	
Ottar Landfald	Centre Party (Norway)	
Sigbjørn Johnsen	Norwegian Labour Party	
Christian Erlandsen	Conservative Party of Norway	
Kjell Borgen	Norwegian Labour Party	
Anne-Lise Bakken	Norwegian Labour Party	

== Hordaland ==
Name	Party	Comments/Suppleant representatives
Harry Hansen	Norwegian Labour Party	
Per Hysing-Dahl	Conservative Party of Norway	
Sverre L. Mo	Christian Democratic Party of Norway	
Arne Nilsen	Norwegian Labour Party	
Sigrid Utkilen	Conservative Party of Norway	
Margit Tøsdal	Norwegian Labour Party	
Asbjørn Haugstvedt	Christian Democratic Party of Norway	
Håkon Randal	Conservative Party of Norway	
Hallvard Bakke	Norwegian Labour Party	
Sverre Helland	Centre Party (Norway)	
Arne Skauge	Conservative Party of Norway	
Aksel Fossen	Norwegian Labour Party	
Hans Olav Tungesvik	Christian Democratic Party of Norway	
Inger-Lise Skarstein	Conservative Party of Norway	
Georg Johan Jacobsen	Norwegian Labour Party	

== Møre og Romsdal ==
Name	Party	Comments/Suppleant representatives
Asbjørn Reidar Jordahl	Norwegian Labour Party	
Odd Vigestad	Christian Democratic Party of Norway	
Oddbjørn Sverre Langlo	Conservative Party of Norway	
Arve Berg	Norwegian Labour Party	
Arnold Weiberg-Aurdal	Centre Party (Norway)	
Kjell Magne Bondevik	Christian Democratic Party of Norway	
Mary Eide	Norwegian Labour Party	
Anders Talleraas	Conservative Party of Norway	
Hans Hammond Rossbach	Venstre (Norway)	
Aslaug Fredriksen	Christian Democratic Party of Norway	

== Nordland ==
Name	Party	Comments/Suppleant representatives
Eivind Bolle	Norwegian Labour Party	
Rolf Hellem	Norwegian Labour Party	
Håkon Kyllingmark	Conservative Party of Norway	
Bjarne Mørk-Eidem	Norwegian Labour Party	
Odd With	Christian Democratic Party of Norway	
Kåre Rønning	Centre Party (Norway)	
Anne-Lise Steinbach	Norwegian Labour Party	
Petter Thomassen	Conservative Party of Norway	
Per Karstensen	Norwegian Labour Party	
Gudmund Grytøyr	Norwegian Labour Party	
Karl Sverre Klevstad	Christian Democratic Party of Norway	
Hanna Kvanmo	Socialist Left Party	

== Oppland ==
Name	Party	Comments/Suppleant representatives
Liv Andersen	Norwegian Labour Party	
Rolf Furuseth	Norwegian Labour Party	
Ola O. Røssum	Centre Party (Norway)	
Kristine Rusten	Norwegian Labour Party	
Harald U. Lied	Conservative Party of Norway	
Åge Hovengen	Norwegian Labour Party	
Olav Djupvik	Christian Democratic Party of Norway	

== Oslo ==
Name	Party	Comments/Suppleant representatives
Trygve Bratteli	Norwegian Labour Party	
Kåre Willoch	Conservative Party of Norway	
Reiulf Steen	Norwegian Labour Party	
Wenche Bryn Lowzow	Conservative Party of Norway	
Gro Harlem Brundtland	Norwegian Labour Party	
Jan P. Syse	Conservative Party of Norway	
Eli Kristiansen	Christian Democratic Party of Norway	Elected as part of a joint list consisting of Centre Party/Christian Democratic Party/Venstre/Det Nye FolkePartiet.
Thorbjørn Berntsen	Norwegian Labour Party	
Lars Roar Langslet	Conservative Party of Norway	
Haldis Havrøy	Norwegian Labour Party	
Paul Thyness	Conservative Party of Norway	
Stein Ørnhøi	Socialist Left Party	
Knut Frydenlund	Norwegian Labour Party	
Karin Hafstad	Conservative Party of Norway	
Einar Førde	Norwegian Labour Party	

== Rogaland ==
Name	Party	Comments/Suppleant representatives
Gunnar Berge	Norwegian Labour Party	
Kristin Kverneland Lønningdal	Conservative Party of Norway	
Jakob Aano	Christian Democratic Party of Norway	
Geirmund Ihle	Norwegian Labour Party	
Claus Egil Feyling	Conservative Party of Norway	
Knut Haus	Christian Democratic Party of Norway	
Gunn Vigdis Olsen-Hagen	Norwegian Labour Party	
Ole Gabriel Ueland	Centre Party (Norway)	
Marit Løvvig	Conservative Party of Norway	
Hans Frette	Norwegian Labour Party	

== Sogn og Fjordane ==
Name	Party	Comments/Suppleant representatives
Kåre Øvregard	Norwegian Labour Party	
Per J. Husabø	Christian Democratic Party of Norway	
Lars Lefdal	Conservative Party of Norway	
Ambjørg Sælthun	Centre Party (Norway)	
Oddleif Fagerheim	Norwegian Labour Party	

== Telemark ==
Name	Party	Comments/Suppleant representatives
Finn Kristensen	Norwegian Labour Party	
Turid Dørumsgaard Varsi	Norwegian Labour Party	
Torstein Tynning	Conservative Party of Norway	
Kjell Bohlin	Norwegian Labour Party	
Jørgen Sønstebø	Christian Democratic Party of Norway	
Egil Bergsland	Norwegian Labour Party	

== Troms ==
Name	Party	Comments/Suppleant representatives
Asbjørn Sjøthun	Norwegian Labour Party	
Arnljot Norwich	Conservative Party of Norway	
Kirsten Myklevoll	Norwegian Labour Party	
Per Almar Aas	Christian Democratic Party of Norway	
Rolf Nilssen	Norwegian Labour Party	
Margit Hansen-Krone	Conservative Party of Norway	

== Nord-Trøndelag ==
Name	Party	Comments/Suppleant representatives
Guttorm Hansen	Norwegian Labour Party	
Inger Lise Gjørv	Norwegian Labour Party	
Johan J. Jakobsen	Centre Party (Norway)	
Gunnar Vada	Conservative Party of Norway	Elected on a joint list consisting of the Conservative Party/Christian Democratic Party.
Johnny Stenberg	Norwegian Labour Party	
Reidar Due	Centre Party (Norway)	

== Sør-Trøndelag ==
Name	Party	Comments/Suppleant representatives
Liv Aasen	Norwegian Labour Party	
Hermund Eian	Conservative Party of Norway	
Roald Åsmund Bye	Norwegian Labour Party	
Jens P. Flå	Christian Democratic Party of Norway	Elected as part of a joint list consisting of Centre Party/Christian Democratic Party/Venstre/Det Nye FolkePartiet.
Kjell Helland	Norwegian Labour Party	
Johan Syrstad	Centre Party (Norway)	
Gunvor Margaret Schnitler	Conservative Party of Norway	
Rolf Fjeldvær	Norwegian Labour Party	
Jostein Berntsen	Norwegian Labour Party	
Odd Einar Dørum	Venstre (Norway)	Elected as part of a joint list consisting of Centre Party/Christian Democratic Party/Venstre/Det Nye FolkePartiet.

== Vestfold ==
Name	Party	Comments/Suppleant representatives
Astrid Murberg Martinsen	Norwegian Labour Party	
Odd Vattekar	Conservative Party of Norway	
Petter Furberg	Norwegian Labour Party	
Thor Knudsen	Conservative Party of Norway	
Alf Martin Bjørnø	Norwegian Labour Party	
Åge Ramberg	Christian Democratic Party of Norway	
Karen Sogn	Conservative Party of Norway	

== Østfold ==
Name	Party	Comments/Suppleant representatives
Ingvar Bakken	Norwegian Labour Party	
Arvid Johanson	Norwegian Labour Party	
Svenn Thorkild Stray	Conservative Party of Norway	
Liv Stubberud	Norwegian Labour Party	
Lars Korvald	Christian Democratic Party of Norway	
Thorbjørn Kultorp	Norwegian Labour Party	
Georg Apenes	Conservative Party of Norway	
Tom Thoresen	Norwegian Labour Party	
