= Sandaune =

Sandaune is a surname. Notable people with the surname include:

- Brit Sandaune (born 1972), Norwegian footballer and teacher
- Lill Harriet Sandaune (born 1973), Norwegian politician
