= Gunn Karin Gjul =

Norwegian jurist and politician

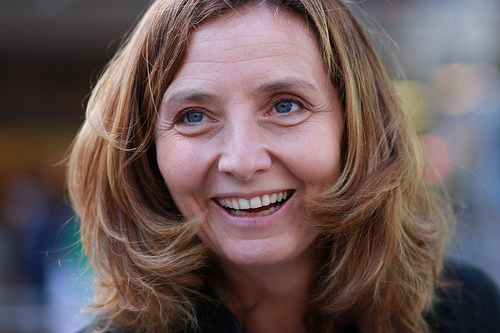
Gunn Karin Gjul

Gunn Karin Gjul (born 26 July 1967, in Stavanger) is a Norwegian jurist and politician for the Labour Party.

She was elected to the Norwegian Parliament from Sør-Trøndelag in 1993, and was re-elected on four occasions. She did not seek reelection in the 2013 Norwegian parliamentary election.

On the local level she was a member of Sør-Trøndelag county council from 1987 to 1993. She hails from Ørland Municipality.

A jurist by education, she carried through her studies while a member of parliament.
