= Isak Veierud Busch =

Norwegian politician (born 1988)

Member of the Storting
- Incumbent
- Assumed office 1 October 2025
- Constituency: Sør-Trøndelag

Mayor of Røros Municipality
- In office 24 October 2019 – 30 October 2025
- Deputy: Christian Elgaaen
- Preceded by: Hans Vintervold
- Succeeded by: Sadmira Buljubasic

Personal details
- Born: 15 August 1988 (age 37)
- Party: Labour
- Occupation: Teacher

Isak Veierud Busch (born 15 August 1988) is a Norwegian teacher and politician who has served as a member of the Storting for Sør-Trøndelag since 2025. A member of the Labour Party, he has previously served as the mayor of Røros from 2019 to 2025.

== Political career ==
=== Local politics ===
Busch has been a member of the Røros Municipal Council since 2015. He became mayor following the 2019 local elections, with the Socialist Left Party's Christian Elgaaen as deputy mayor. He succeeded three-term mayor Hans Vintervold. The duo were re-elected in 2023. He was succeeded by Sadmira Buljubasic upon taking his seat in parliament.

=== Parliament ===
Busch was elected to the Storting for Sør-Trøndelag at the 2025 election.

In parliament, he has sat on the Standing Committee on Local Government and Public Administration since 2025.

== Civic career ==
A teacher by profession, Busch has worked at various elementary and upper secondary schools. Since 2016, he has served as the assistant principal at Hov elementary school in Ålen, but has been on leave since becoming mayor.
