= Maren Grøthe =

Norwegian politician

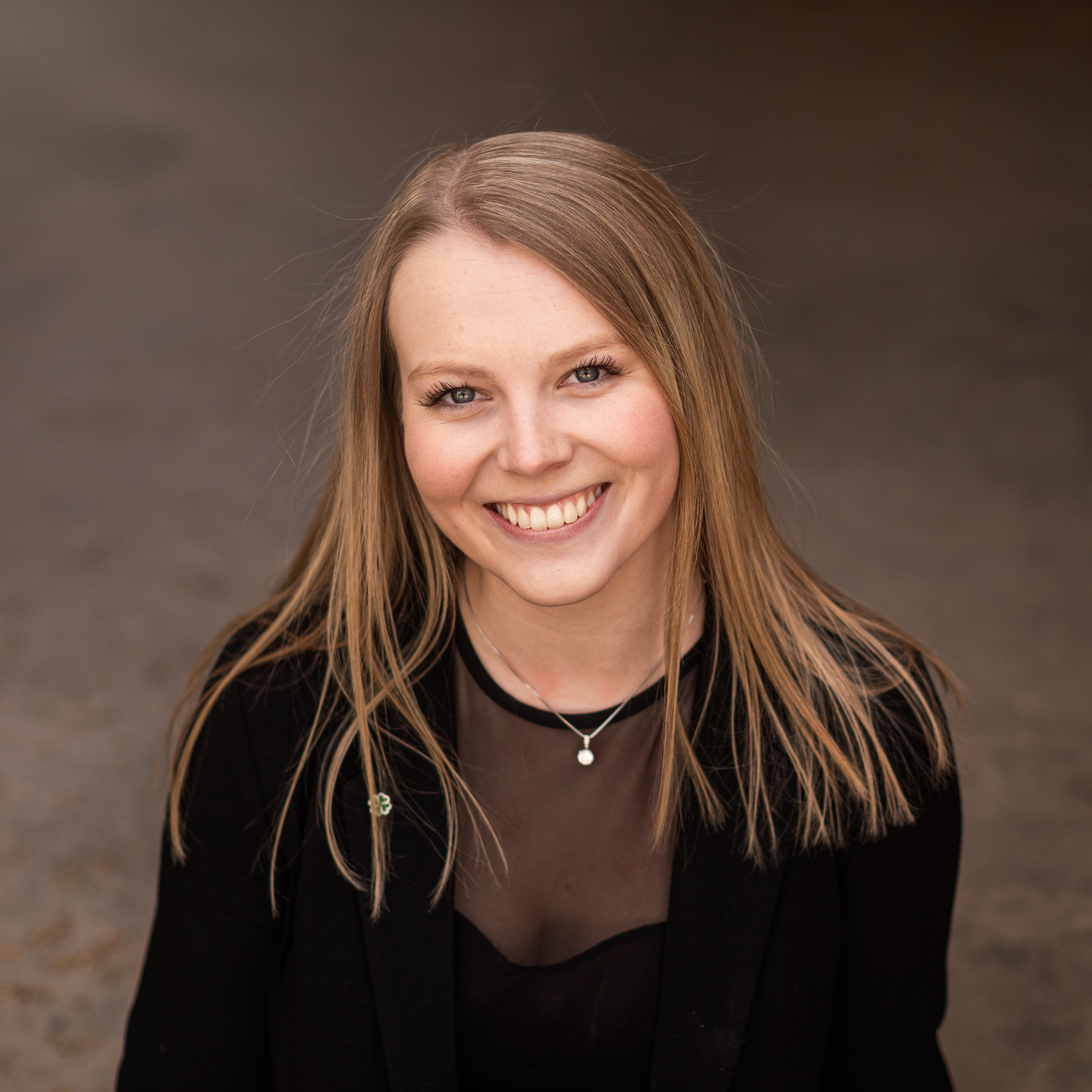

Member of the Storting
- Incumbent
- Assumed office 1 October 2025
- Constituency: Sør-Trøndelag

Deputy Member of the Storting
- In office 1 October 2021 – 30 September 2025
- Deputising for: Ola Borten Moe (2021–2023)
- Constituency: Sør-Trøndelag

Personal details
- Born: 14 July 2001 (age 25) Melhus Municipality, Sør-Trøndelag, Norway
- Party: Centre
- Occupation: Politician

Maren Grøthe (born 14 July 2001) is a Norwegian politician currently serving as a member of the Storting for Sør-Trøndelag since 2025. A member of the Centre Party, she is the youngest person elected as a representative in the Storting.

== Political career ==
=== Melhus ===
In 2019, she became a member of the Melhus municipal council, where she is native to as she comes from Hølonda.

=== Parliament ===
She was elected deputy representative to the Storting from the constituency of Sør-Trøndelag for the period 2021–2025, for the Centre Party, and deputised for Ola Borten Moe while he was government minister. She was announced as the first candidate for the 2025 Norwegian parliamentary election in 2024 for Sør-Trøndelag. She stated that the issues she wanted to address were giving equal opportunities to people across regions, tightening the drug policy, and gaining more control over Norwegian natural resources. After the 2025 election, she was elected as a regular member of the Storting.

She was the youngest representative ever to meet regularly at the Storting. She hails from western Melhus Municipality (in the area of the old Hølonda Municipality).

In the Storting, she was a member of the Standing Committee on Education and Research from 2021 to 2023. During her time in the committee, she worked on the issue of the teacher shortage, and became a proponent of the scheme to have student loans written off for teachers who moved to Sápmi or Nord-Troms where there is a particular shortage. She later worked as a political advisor to the Minister of Children and Family Affairs, Kjersti Toppe, when she was still minister from 2023 to 2025.

== Personal life ==
She lives in Trondheim with her boyfriend and has an apartment in Oslo, which she commutes to. She has stated that she likes hiking in the mountains and partying outside of politics.
