= Morten Lund (politician) =

Norwegian politician (born 1945)

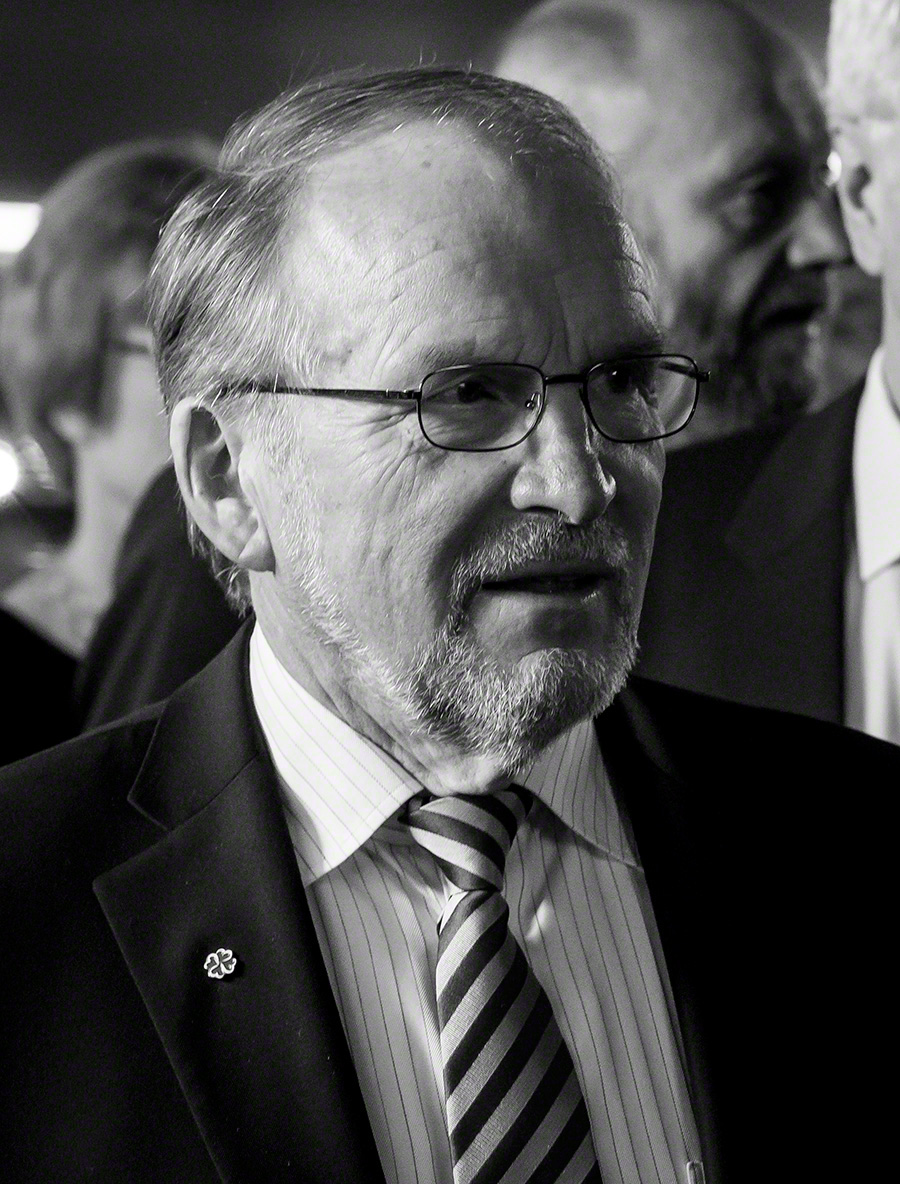
- Born: 6 January 1945 (age 81); Bjugn Municipality, Norway
- Occupation: politician
- Political party: Centre Party

Morten Lund (born 6 January 1945) is a Norwegian politician for the Centre Party. He was mayor of Bjugn Municipality from 1988 to 1993. He was a member of the Parliament of Norway from 1993 to 2005, representing Sør-Trøndelag.
