= Anniken Refseth =

Norwegian politician

Member of the Storting
- Incumbent
- Assumed office 2025
- Constituency: Sør-Trøndelag

Personal details
- Born: 28 December 1975 (age 50)
- Party: Labour

Anniken Refseth (born 28 December 1975) is a Norwegian politician from the Labour Party (Ap). She was elected to the Storting in the 2025 Norwegian parliamentary election.

== See also ==
- List of members of the Storting, 2025–2029
