= Hege Bae Nyholt =

Norwegian politician

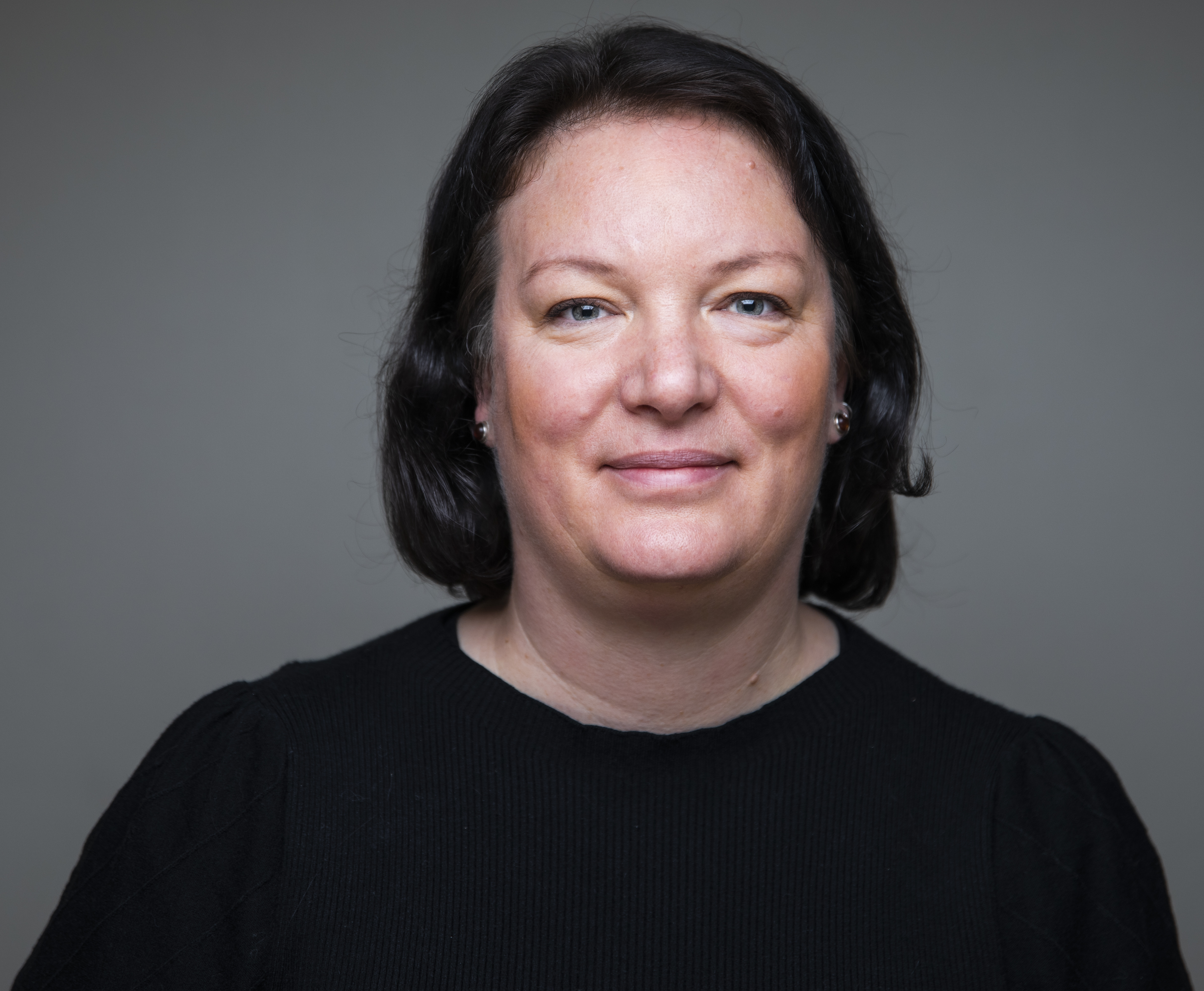

Member of the Storting
- Incumbent
- Assumed office 1 October 2021
- Constituency: Sør-Trøndelag

Personal details
- Born: 2 August 1978 (age 48) Lillehammer, Oppland, Norway
- Party: Red
- Education: Sør-Trøndelag University College
- Occupation: Politician; Child welfare officer

Hege Bae Nyholt (born 2 August 1978) is a Norwegian politician and child welfare officer for the Red Party. She has been a member of the Storting, Norway's parliament, for Sør-Trøndelag since 2021.

== Political career ==
=== Parliament ===
She was elected as a representative to the Storting from the constituency of Sør-Trøndelag at the 2021 election.

In parliament, she has been a member of the Preparatory Credentials Committee and the Standing Committee on Education and Research, the latter of which she is chair of. She was also the first committee chair from the Red Party.

== Personal life ==
Born in Lillehammer on 2 August 1978, Nyholt studied at the Sør-Trøndelag University College. She previously worked in the kindergarten sector for seventeen years.
