= Per Risvik =

Norwegian politician (1937–2023)

Per Risvik (4 September 1937 – 22 November 2023) was a Norwegian politician for the Progress Party.

He was born in Herøy Municipality to a shop-owning family. After finishing vocational school in 1955 he was a shop clerk. He attended mercantile school from 1959 to 1960 and was then a traveling salesman before owning his own business.

Risvik entered politics as a deputy member of the municipal council for Trondheim Municipality in 1983, being elected as a regular member in 1987. He also held municipal posts such as being a member of the board of the fire department and the port authority. He was elected to the Storting from Sør-Trøndelag in 1989, serving on the Standing Committee on Transport and Communications.

Risvik was also leader of Trondheim Progress Party from 1988 to 1990, deputy leader of Sør-Trøndelag Progress Party from 1989 to 1991 and leader of Sør-Trøndelag Progress Party from 1994 to 1995. He was also active in the Norges Huseierforbund for decades, serving as national vice president from 1997 to 2002. From 2000 to 2003 he had a second stint in local politics, being elected to Sør-Trøndelag county council.
