= Jorodd Asphjell =

Norwegian politician (born 1960)

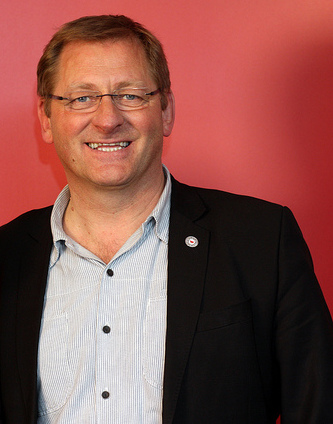
Jorodd Asphjell

Jorodd Asphjell (born 17 July 1960 in Orkdal Municipality) is a Norwegian politician for the Labour Party.

He was elected to the Norwegian Parliament from Sør-Trøndelag in 2005. He has been re-elected at every election since. In March 2024, he announced that he wouldn't seek re-election at the 2025 election.

On the local level, he was a member of the municipal council of Orkdal Municipality from 1983 to 1987, later serving as deputy mayor from 1999 to 2003. He chairs the local party chapter since 2003.

He worked at a printing press from 1977 to 1994, and was county secretary of his party from 1997 to 2005. He has also been a board member of local sports clubs and organizations. He hails from Fannrem.
