= Lars Tangvik =

Norwegian politician

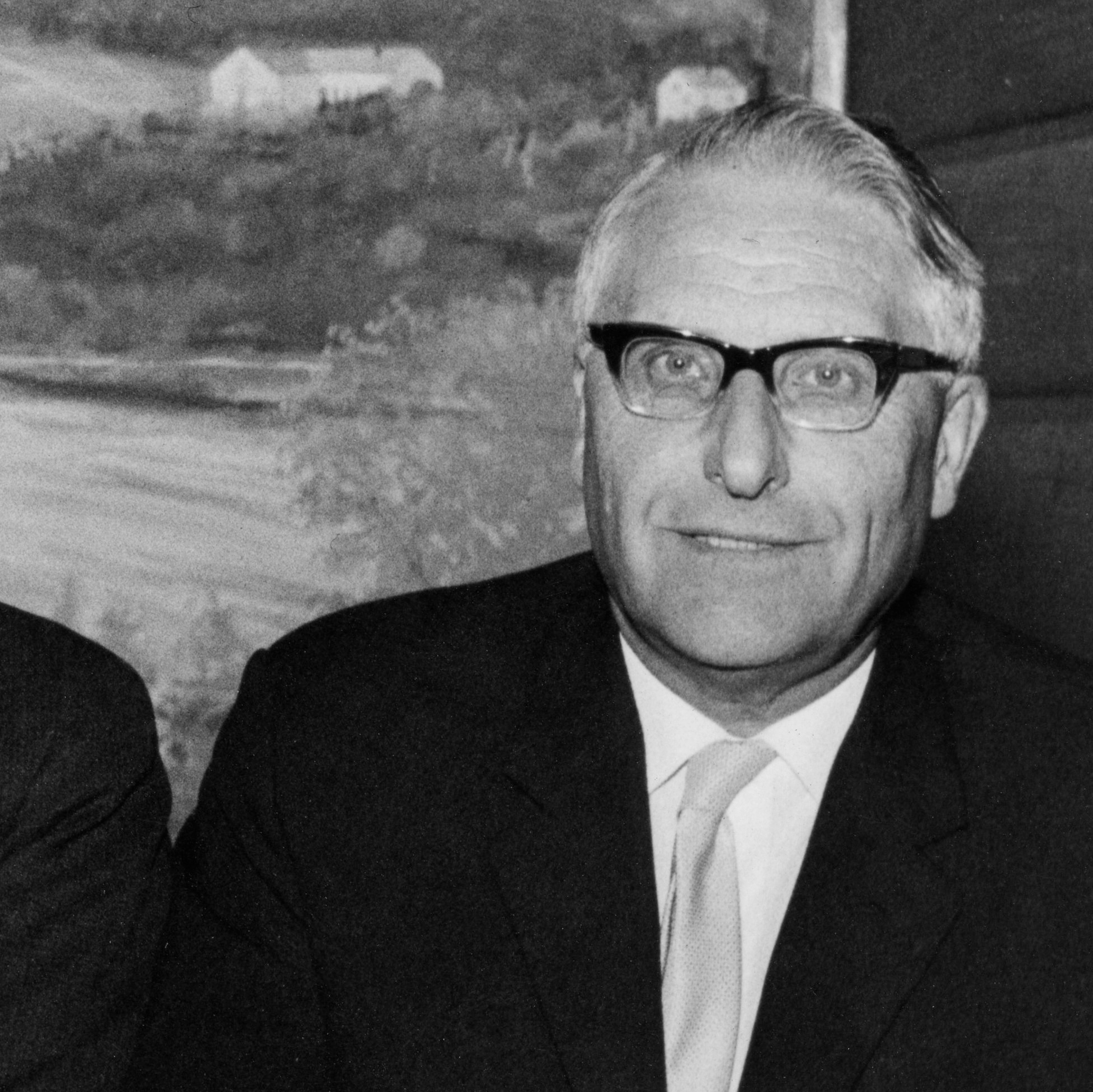
Lars Tangvik during a political debate, 1965 Credit: Trondheim byarkiv

Lars Tangvik (23 May 1902 – 28 July 1991) was a Norwegian politician for the Liberal Party.

He was born in Stadsbygd Municipality.

He was elected to the Norwegian Parliament from Sør-Trøndelag in 1965, but was not re-elected in 1969. He had previously served in the position of deputy representative during the terms 1954–1957 (for Nord-Trøndelag) and 1958–1961.

Tangvik was a member of the municipal councils of Hegra Municipality, Stjørdal Municipality, and Trondheim Municipality at different times between 1945 and 1965.
