= Kirsti Leirtrø =

Norwegian politician (born 1963)

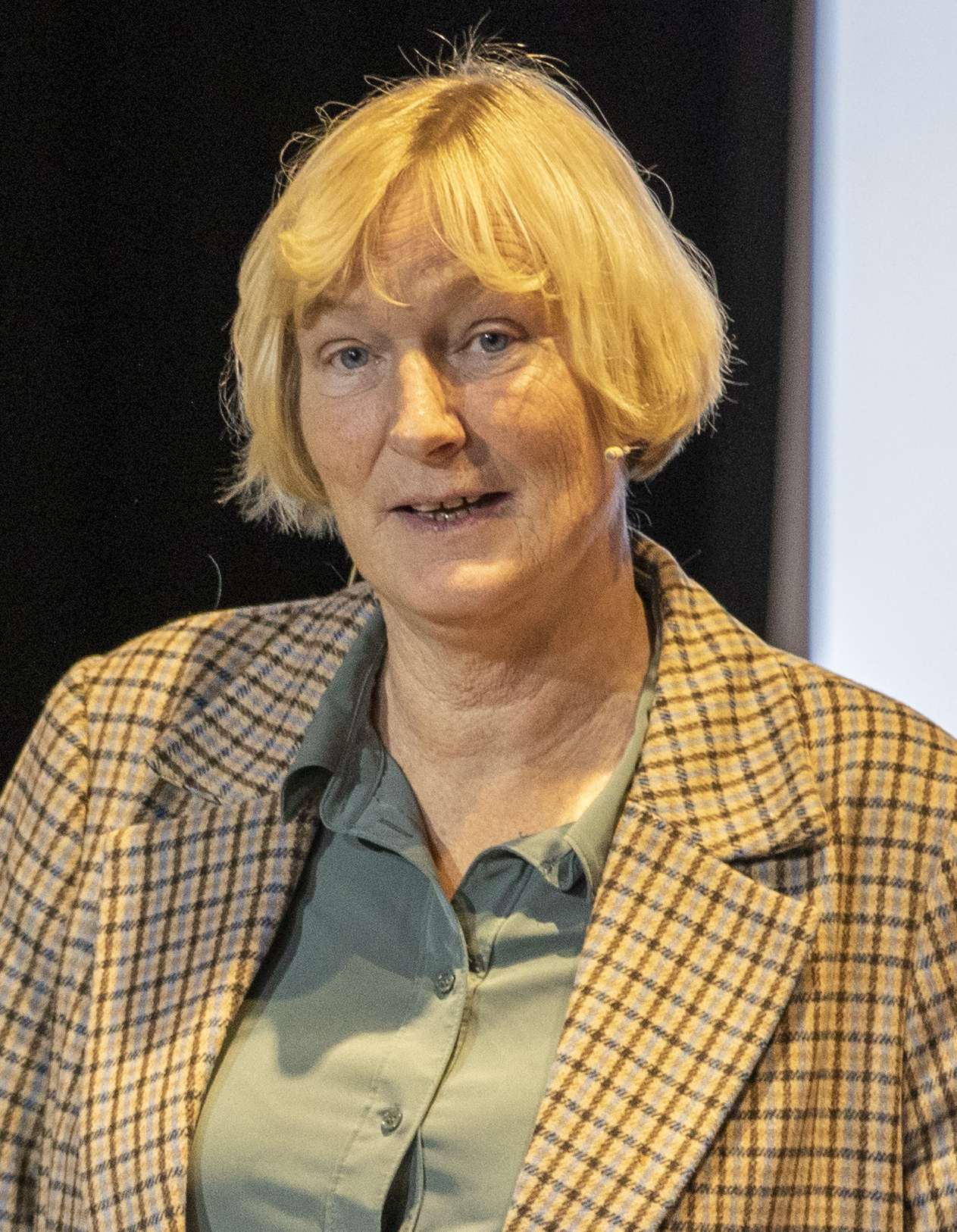
- Born: 27 August 1963 (age 62); Stjørdal Municipality, Norway
- Occupation: Politician
- Political party: Labour Party

Kirsti Leirtrø (born 27 August 1963) is a Norwegian politician for the Labour Party. She has been a member of the Storting since 2017.

== Career ==
Leirtrø was elected representative to the Storting from the constituency of Sør-Trøndelag for the period 2017–2021 for the Labour Party. In the Storting, she was a member of the Standing Committee on Transport and Communications from 2017 to 2021.

She was re-elected to the Storting for the period 2021–2025.

== Personal life ==
Leirtrø was born in Stjørdal Municipality on 27 August 1963, to Kåre Leirtrø and Brit Vinje.
