= Rikard Spets =

Norwegian writer from Sandefjord (born 1971)

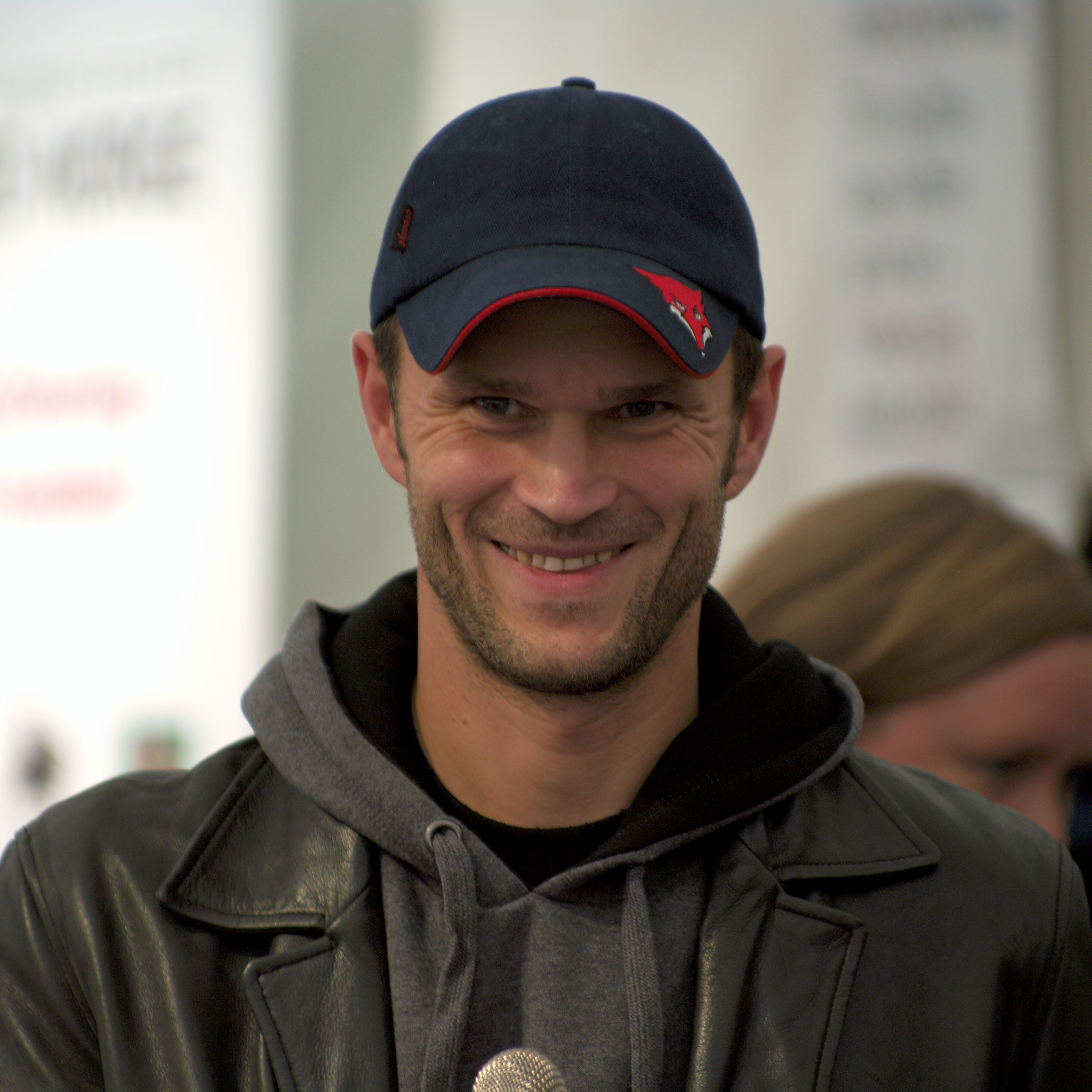

Member of the Storting
- Incumbent
- Assumed office 1 October 2025
- Constituency: Sør-Trøndelag

Personal details
- Born: March 19, 1971 (age 55) Trondheim, Sør-Trøndelag
- Party: Progress
- Occupation: Author, Politician

Rikard Spets (born March 19, 1971, in Trondheim) is a Norwegian writer and politician from Sandefjord Municipality. He debuted in 2011 with the crime novel Allahs tårer.

He got elected to the Storting for the Progress Party in 2025.

Spets graduated in marketing and worked as a sales and marketing until in 2007 he resigned to pursue his dream of becoming a writer.
