= Kristine L. Solli =

Norwegian politician (born 1989)

Member of the Storting
- Incumbent
- Assumed office 1 October 2025
- Constituency: Sør-Trøndelag

Personal details
- Born: 25 May 1989 (age 36) Løkken Verk
- Citizenship: Norwegian
- Party: Labour Party

Kristine L. Solli (born 25 May 1989) is a Norwegian politician who was elected member of the Storting in 2025. From 2023 until the 2025–2026 session of the Storting started, she was a municipal councillor of Orkland.

Solli has a PhD in politics from Cardiff University, and as a student she was used as an expert on Brexit by Norwegian media. Prior to her parliament duty, she worked at the supermarket chain Coop Extra.
