= Iver Johan Unsgård =

Norwegian politician

Iver Johan Unsgård (26 June 1903 – 30 June 1993) was a Norwegian politician for the Labour Party.

He was elected to the Norwegian Parliament from Sør-Trøndelag in 1958, and was re-elected on two occasions. He had previously been a deputy representative from 1954 to 1957.

Unsgård was born in Tydal Municipality. He was mayor of Tydal Municipality during the terms 1945–1951, 1951–1955, and 1955–1958.
