= Jens P. Flå =

Norwegian politician (1923–2002)

Jens P. Flå (born 13 February 1923 in Rennebu Municipality, died 31 January 2002) was a Norwegian politician for the Christian Democratic Party.

Flå was elected to the Norwegian Parliament from Sør-Trøndelag in 1973, and he was re-elected on two occasions. He had previously served as a deputy representative during the term 1969–1973.

On the local level, he was a member of the municipal council of Rennebu Municipality from 1947 to 1973, serving as mayor since 1959. From 1959 to 1969, he, being mayor, was also a member of Sør-Trøndelag county council. He chaired the local party chapter from 1948 to 1951.

Outside of politics, he spent most of his career as a farmer.
