= Amund Rasmussen Skarholt =

Norwegian politician

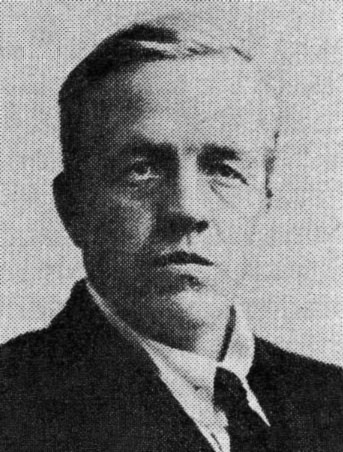
Amund Rasmussen Skarholt

Amund Rasmussen Skarholt (31 March 1892 – 28 April 1956) was a Norwegian politician for the Norwegian Labour Party.

He was born in Orkdal Municipality.

He was elected to the Norwegian Parliament from Sør-Trøndelag in 1934, and was re-elected on four occasions. During his fifth term, he died. He was then replaced by Jenny Lund.

Skarholt was a member of the municipal council of Orkdal Municipality between 1919 and 1951. He served most of this time as a member of the executive committee.
