= Paul Martin Dahlø =

Norwegian politician

Paul Martin Dahlø (29 August 1885 – 2 May 1967) was a Norwegian politician for the Labour Party.

He was elected to the Norwegian Parliament from Sør-Trøndelag in 1945, and was re-elected on two occasions. He had previously served as a deputy representative during the terms 1928–1930, 1931–1933, and 1937–1945.

Dahlø was born in Frøya Municipality and a member of the municipal council of Sør-Frøya Municipality between 1925 and 1955, except for a period between 1941 and 1945. He served as mayor in the periods 1934–1937, 1937–1941 and 1945–1947.

Outside politics, he was a fisher. He was a member of the board of Norges sildesalslag from 1936-1945, Fiskernes samkjøp from 1938-1950, and Norges Fiskarlag from 1945-1951.
