= Johan Olaus Olsen Asmundvaag =

Norwegian politician

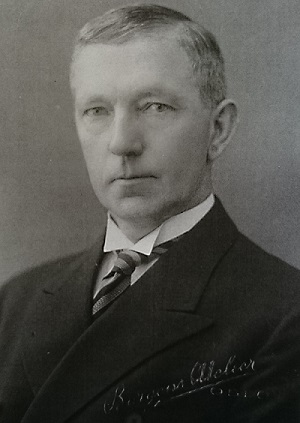
Johan Olaus Olsen Asmundvaag

Johan Olaus Olsen Asmundvaag (9 April 1880 – 21 August 1946) was a Norwegian farmer, military officer, bailiff and politician for the Conservative Party.

He was born in Hitra Municipality as a son of farmers. His professional training was at the petty officers' school, and he held the military ranks of sergeant from 1908 and lieutenant from 1930. He also ran the family farm Hofstad from 1904, was a treasurer at the local savings bank from 1906 as well as bailiff of Hitra Municipality and Kvenvær Municipality from 1938.

He chaired a large number of municipal committees and also served as mayor of Hitra Municipality from 1913 to 1916, 1922 to 1925 and 1931 to 1934. He was elected to the Parliament of Norway in the elections of 1930, 1933 and 1936, serving the last term until 1945 because of the intermittent German occupation of Norway.
