= Lill Harriet Sandaune =

Norwegian politician

Member of the Storting
- Incumbent
- Assumed office 1 October 2025
- Constituency: Sør-Trøndelag

Deputy Member of the Storting
- In office 1 October 2009 – 30 September 2025
- Deputising for: Per Sandberg (2015–2017)
- Constituency: Sør-Trøndelag

Personal details
- Born: 27 October 1973 (age 52)
- Party: Progress

Lill Harriet Sandaune (born 27 October 1973) is a Norwegian politician for the Progress Party.

She has served as an elected member of the municipal council of Malvik Municipality and the Sør-Trøndelag county council. In the 2009 and 2013 elections she was elected as a deputy representative to the Parliament of Norway from Sør-Trøndelag. When Per Sandberg became a member of Solberg's Cabinet, she met as a regular representative until the 2017 election. She was elected as a regular representative in 2025.

She hails from Hommelvik and works as a teacher at Skjetlein Upper Secondary School.
