= Gunvor Margaret Schnitler =

Norwegian politician (born 1930)

Gunvor Margaret Schnitler (born 8 January 1930 in Leksvik Municipality) is a Norwegian politician for the Conservative Party.

She was elected to the Norwegian Parliament from Sør-Trøndelag in 1977, and was re-elected on one occasion.

On the local level she was a member of the executive committee of the municipal council of Trondheim Municipality from 1975 to 1979. From 1971 to 1975 she was a deputy member of Sør-Trøndelag county council.

She has been a board member of Norges Forsvarsforening and Kiwanis International.
