= Christopher Stensaker =

Norwegian politician (1945–2018)

Christopher Stensaker (22 January 1945 – 31 July 2018) was a Norwegian politician for the Progress Party.

He was elected to the Norwegian Parliament from Sør-Trøndelag in 1997, and was re-elected on one occasion. He had previously served in the position of deputy representative during the term 1989–1993.

Stensaker was a member of Trondheim city council during the term 1987–1991, and was also a member of Sør-Trøndelag county council in 1981–1983.
