= Endre Kristian Vestvik =

Norwegian politician

Endre Kristian Vestvik (12 September 1894 – 29 March 1956) was a Norwegian politician for the Christian Democratic Party.

He was born in Finnaas Municipality. He was elected to the Norwegian Parliament from Rogaland in 1954. Halfway through the term he died and was replaced by Peder Ree Pedersen. Vestvik had previously in the position of deputy representative during the term 1950–1953.

Vestvik was a member of the municipal council of Randaberg Municipality from 1945 to 1956, serving as mayor from 1947 to 1955.
