= Roald Åsmund Bye =

Norwegian politician (1928–2003)

Roald Åsmund Bye (7 November 1928 in Malvik Municipality – 15 April 2003) was a Norwegian politician for the Labour Party.

He was elected to the Norwegian Parliament from Sør-Trøndelag in 1969, and was re-elected on two occasions. He had previously served as a deputy representative during the terms 1954–1957, 1958–1961, 1961–1965 and 1965–1969.

On the local level he was a member of the municipal council for Malvik Municipality from 1955 to 1967.

Outside politics, he worked as a social security bureaucrat.
