= Arent M. Henriksen =

Norwegian politician (1946–2024)

- Born: 8 September 1946; Sørfold, Norway
- Died: 7 November 2024 (aged 78)
- Occupation: Politician
- Political party: Socialist Left Party

Arent Mikal Henriksen (8 September 1946 – 7 November 2024) was a Norwegian politician who represented the Socialist Left Party (SV), later the Norwegian Labour Party. He was a member of the Parliament of Norway from 1973 to 1977 and from 1981 to 1989, representing Sør-Trøndelag. He was mayor of Bjugn Municipality from 1995 to 1999.

Henriksen was born in Sørfold Municipality on 8 September 1946. From 1996-2000, he was the first chairperson of the new Norwegian State Railways. He died on 7 November 2024, at the age of 78.

First	Chair of NSB; 1996–2000	Succeeded by Olav Fjell
