= Kristoffer Rein =

Norwegian politician (1912–1993)

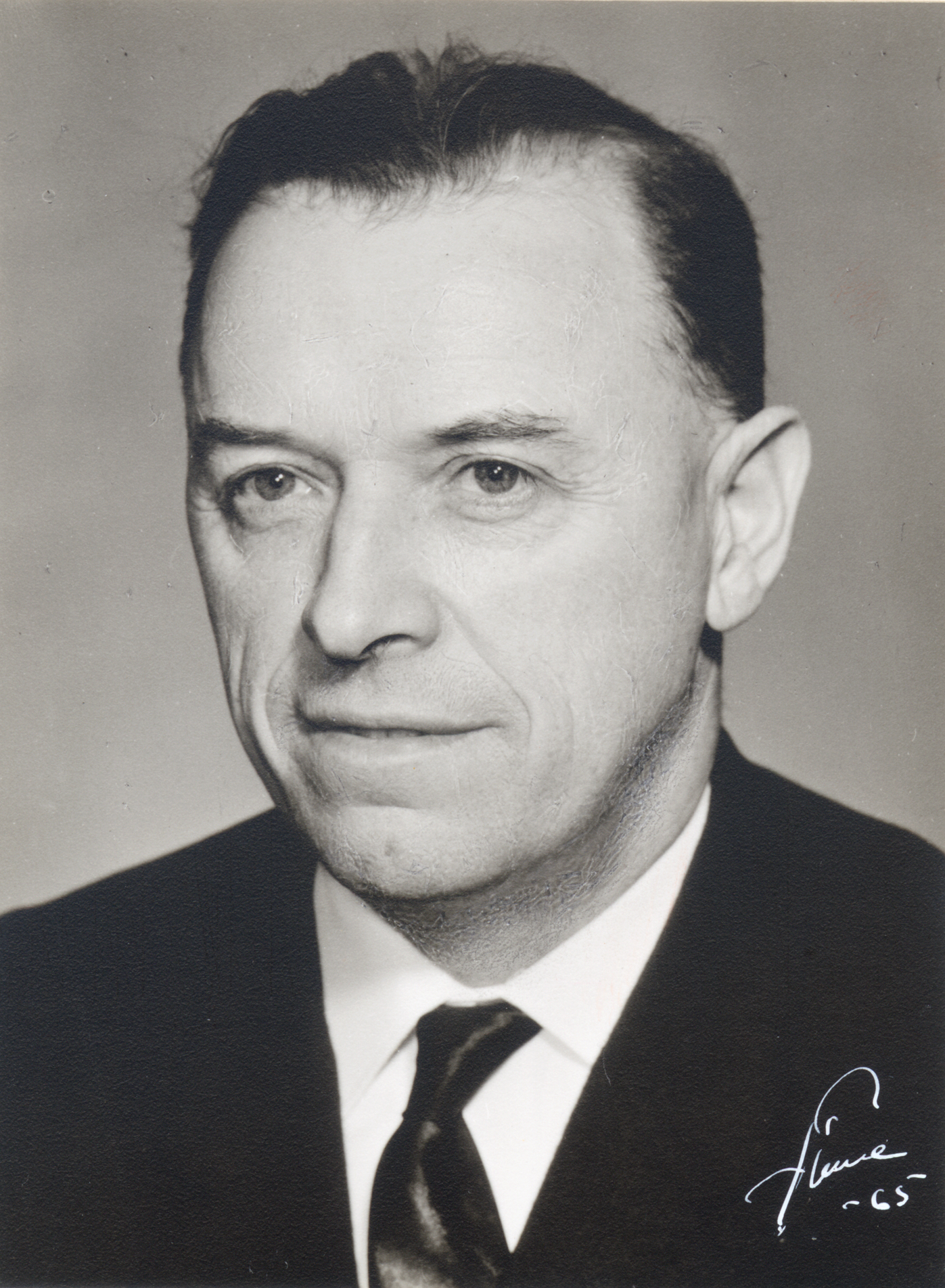
Kristoffer Rein

Kristoffer Rein (18 February 1912 – 18 July 1993) was a Norwegian politician for the Christian Democratic Party.

He was elected to the Norwegian Parliament from Sør-Trøndelag in 1961, and was re-elected on two occasions. He had previously been a deputy representative from 1958–1961.

Rein was born in Stadsbygd and deputy mayor of Stadsbygd municipality during the term 1947–1951, and mayor in the periods 1955–1959 and 1959–1962.
