= Marit Rotnes =

Norwegian politician (1928–2022)

Member of the Norwegian Parliament
- In office 1981–1993
- Constituency: Sør-Trøndelag

Personal details
- Born: 6 April 1928 Oslo, Norway
- Died: 27 March 2022 (aged 93) Oslo, Norway
- Party: Labour Party
- Education: Socionom
- Alma mater: Norges Kommunal- og Sosialhøyskole
- Occupation: Secretary, social worker and politician

Marit Rotnes (6 April 1928 – 27 March 2022) was a Norwegian politician for the Norwegian Labour Party. She was born in Oslo and was educated first as secretary and then as social worker, and was a member of the Storting from 1981 to 1993, representing Sør-Trøndelag.

== Early and personal life ==
Rotnes was born in Oslo on 6 April 1928, a daughter of Erling Gulbrandsen and Harriet Glende. She graduated as secretary in 1948, and worked as stenographer from 1948 to 1952, and then as office assistant in Lillestrøm from 1952 to 1956. She graduated in social work from Norges Kommunal- og Sosialhøyskole in 1958, and from 1962 to 1967 she was appointed as social worker in Skedsmo and in Nord-Trøndelag. After a period as a farmer's wife, she was again social worker, in Fosen and Åfjord. In 1977, she was appointed director of social affairs in Åfjord. Rotnes died in Oslo on 27 March 2022, at the age of 93.

== Political career ==
Rotnes was a member of the municipal council of Åfjord Municipality from 1975 to 1979, and from 1979 to 1981. She was elected to the Storting for three periods. During the first period, from 1981 to 1985, she was a member of Kommunal- og miljøvernkomiteen. From 1984 she was also a delegate to the United Nations General Assembly.

During her second period, she was a member of the Standing Committee on Labour and Social Affairs from 23 October 1985 to 15 May 1986, and of the Standing Committee on Finance and Economic Affairs from 15 May 1986 to 30 September 1989. During her third period at the Storting, from 1989 to 1993, ahe was a member of Forbruker- og administrasjonskomiteen. She was a member of the parliament's delegation to the Nordic Council from 1990 to 1993, having been a deputy member from 1981 to 1990.
