= Siri Frost Sterri =

Norwegian politician (1944–2023)

Siri Frost Sterri (20 September 1944 – 29 October 2023) was a Norwegian politician for the Conservative Party.

Sterri was elected to the Norwegian Parliament from Sør-Trøndelag in 1985 and was re-elected on three occasions. She had previously served in the position of deputy representative during the term 1981–1985.

From 1975 to 1979, she was a deputy member of the executive committee of the municipal council of Malvik Municipality, as well as a member of Sør-Trøndelag county council during the term 1979–1983.

Sterri died on 29 October 2023, at the age of 79.
