= Peder Ree Pedersen =

Norwegian politician

Peder Ree Pedersen (1 April 1913 – 19 June 1976) was a Norwegian politician for the Christian Democratic Party.

He served as a deputy representative to the Norwegian Parliament from Rogaland during the term 1954–1957. Halfway through the term, in 1956, he moved up as a regular representative to replace Endre Kristian Vestvik who had died.

Pedersen was born in Stavanger and a member of the executive committee of Stavanger city council during the term 1947–1951.
