= Hermund Eian =

Norwegian politician

Hermund Eian (3 December 1927 – 26 January 1983) was a Norwegian politician for the Conservative Party.

He was born in Roan Municipality.

He was elected to the Norwegian Parliament from Sør-Trøndelag in 1969, and was re-elected on three occasions. Halfway through his fourth term, he died and was replaced by Harald Ellefsen.

Eian was a deputy member of the municipal council of Roan Municipality during the term 1967–1971, and then a member of its executive committee in 1971–1975.
