= Liv Aasen =

Norwegian politician (1928–2005)

Member of the Norwegian Parliament for Sør-Trøndelag
- In office 1969–1989

Personal details
- Born: 21 September 1928; Bergen, Norway
- Died: 21 August 2005 (aged 76)
- Political party: Labour Party
- Occupation: Schoolteacher

Liv Aasen (21 September 1928 – 21 August 2005) was a Norwegian politician for the Labour Party.

Aasen was born in Bergen. She was elected to the Parliament of Norway from Sør-Trøndelag in 1969, and was re-elected on four occasions, serving twenty years. On the local level she was a member of Kongsberg city council from 1955 to 1959 and of Trondheim city council from 1959 to 1963. Outside politics she worked as a school teacher in Fana, Kongsberg, Trondheim and Geneva. Aasen was married to Per Aasen, Norway's former ambassador to Iceland.
