= Mons Arntsen Løvset =

Norwegian politician

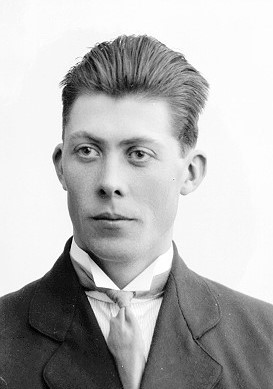
Mons Arntsen Løvset

Mons Arntsen Løvset (18 August 1891 – 7 April 1972) was a Norwegian businessman, newspaper editor and politician for the Conservative Party.

== Biography ==
He was born in Byneset Municipality in Søndre Trondhjem county, Norway. His parents were Arnt Løvset (1873-1938) and Helle Håve (1870-1911). He was raised on the Æli farm in Børsa Municipality which his father acquired in 1899 and which he took over from 1922. He attended vocational school, where he studied business. He was editor of the newspaper Fosen Blad in Trondheim from 1933 until 1941 when publication was stopped by authorities during the German occupation of Norway. He served as chairman of the board of Børsa Kaiselskap from 1939 to 1957. He also served as chairman of the board of the Orkla wood processing plant (Norwegian: Orkla Trekonstruksjon og Impregnering) at Orkanger from 1961.

Løvset was a member of the municipal council of Børsa Municipality between 1947 and 1953. He was elected to the Norwegian Parliament from Sør-Trøndelag from 1950 to 1961.
