= Jostein Berntsen =

Norwegian politician (1943–2024)

Jostein Berntsen (5 February 1943 – 29 September 2024) was a Norwegian politician for the Labour Party.

== Life and career ==
Berntsen was born in Rennebu Municipality as a son of smallholder Bjarne Kolbjørn Berntsen (1908–1980) and housewife Klara Halgunset (1911–1992). He worked as an agronomist and farmer. He was active in the Norwegian Farmers and Smallholders Union and the Norwegian Heart and Lung Patient Organisation.

He was a member of the municipal council of Rennebu Municipality from 1971 to 1977. He chaired the local party chapter from 1971 to 1977. He was elected to the Parliament of Norway from Sør-Trøndelag in 1977, and was re-elected on two occasions. He backed out ahead of the Norwegian parliamentary election of 1989 in protest of the party leadership. He called for the replacement of deputy party leader Einar Førde with Kjell Borgen, with the prospect of seeing Borgen as a future party leader. From 1992 to 1994 he was a board member of the Norwegian State Agriculture Bank.

Berntsen died on 29 September 2024, at the age of 81.
