= Rolf Fjeldvær =

Norwegian politician

Rolf Fjeldvær (1 January 1926 – 25 April 2017) was a Norwegian politician for the Labour Party.

He was elected to the Norwegian Parliament from Sør-Trøndelag county in 1965, and was re-elected on three occasions.

Fjeldvar was born in Fillan. He was a member of the municipality councils in Sandstad Municipality from 1959–1963 and its successor Hitra Municipality from 1963–1967. He chaired the local party chapter from 1962 to 1966 and from 1990 to 1997.

Outside politics he worked as a school teacher from 1951 (until 1954 in Vardø). In 1960 he was promoted to school inspector; from 1964 to 1988 he was the local school director.
