= Lars Sæter =

Norwegian politician

Lars Sæter (13 May 1895 – 27 May 1988) was a Norwegian politician for the Christian Democratic Party.

He was born in Surendal Municipality.

He was elected to the Norwegian Parliament from Sør-Trøndelag in 1954, and was re-elected on one occasion.

Sæter was a member of the executive committee of the municipal council of Trondheim Municipality between 1945 and 1947, and a member of the municipal council for Surnadal Municipality in 1963–1964.
