= Otto Lyng =

Norwegian politician

Otto Lyng (15 July 1926 – 9 September 2003) was a Norwegian politician for the Conservative Party.

He was born in Enebakk.

He was elected to the Norwegian Parliament from Sør-Trøndelag in 1958, and was re-elected on four occasions. He had previously been a deputy representative from 1954–1957.

Lyng was a member of Trondheim city council in the terms 1959–1963 and 1995–1999, and of Sør-Trøndelag county council in 1979–1983.
