= Ingvald Jaklin =

Norwegian politician

Ingvald Johannes Jaklin (22 February 1896 – 13 December 1966) was a Norwegian politician for the Labour Party.

He was born in Lyngen Municipality in Troms county, Norway.

He was elected to the Norwegian Parliament from the Market towns of Nordland, Troms and Finnmark in 1950, and was re-elected on two occasions. He had previously served in the position of deputy representative during the term 1945–1949.

Jaklin held various positions in Tromsø city council from 1925 to 1963, serving as mayor in the periods 1945–1947, 1947–1951 and 1951–1953.
