= Bjarne Fjærtoft =

Norwegian politician (1899–1981)

Bjarne Fjærtoft (7 November 1899 – 28 August 1981) is a Norwegian politician for the Liberal Party.

He was born in Jondal Municipality.

He was elected to the Norwegian Parliament from Møre og Romsdal in 1954, and was re-elected on one occasion.

Fjærtoft held various positions in the municipal council of Ålesund Municipality from 1947 to 1955, serving as mayor in 1950–1951.

Outside politics he worked as a jurist, most notably as stipendiary magistrate (byfogd) in from 1946 to 1969, having graduated as cand.jur. in 1924. He was also involved in the local fish trade.
