= Peter Torleivson Molaug =

Norwegian politician (1902–1985)

Peter Torleivson Molaug (2 September 1902 – 22 August 1985) was a Norwegian politician for the Conservative Party. He was born in Hetland Municipality.

He was elected to the Norwegian Parliament from Rogaland in 1954, and was re-elected on one occasions. He then served as a deputy representative during the term 1961–1965, but in early 1965, before the end of this term he replaced the deceased Ole Bergesen as a regular representative.
