= Andreas Wormdahl =

Norwegian politician (1911–2001)

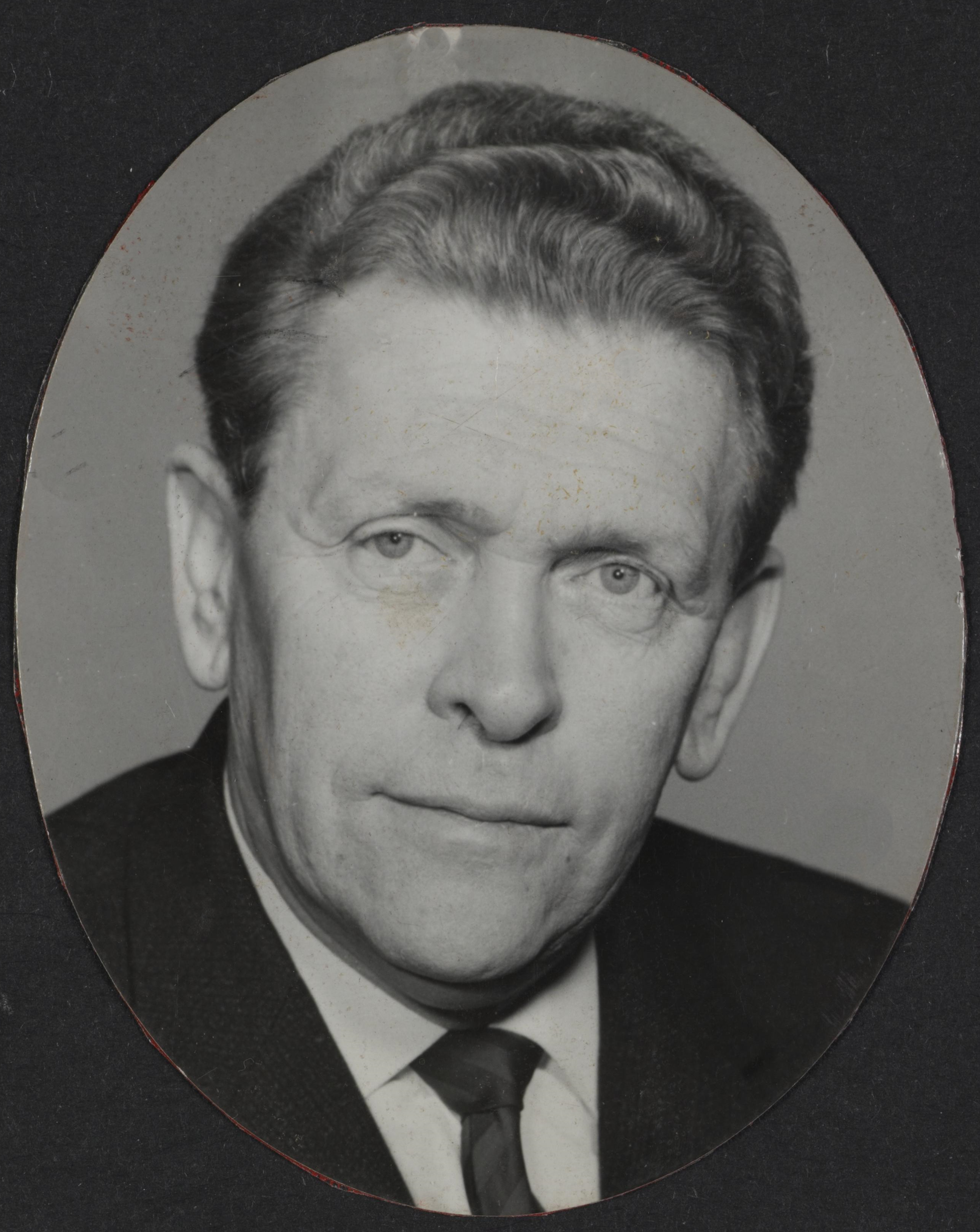
Andreas Wormdahl

Andreas Wormdahl (20 January 1911 – 14 June 2001) was a Norwegian politician for the Labour Party.

He was born in Trondheim.

He was elected to the Norwegian Parliament from Sør-Trøndelag in 1958, and was re-elected on two occasions.

Wormdahl was a member of Orkanger municipality council in the periods 1934–1937 and 1937–1940.
