= Bjarne Daniel Solli =

Norwegian politician (1910–1989)

Bjarne Daniel Solli (7 November 1910 – 22 October 1989) was a Norwegian politician for the Labour Party.

He was born in Lenvik Municipality.

He was elected to the Norwegian Parliament from Troms county in 1954, and was re-elected on one occasion.

Solli was mayor of Lenvik Municipality between 1945 and 1953. He also served the last period 1953–1955 as a member of the executive committee of the municipal council of Lenvik.
