= Kjell Helland =

Norwegian politician (born 1940)

Kjell Edvard Helland (born 29 May 1940 in Melhus Municipality) is a Norwegian politician for the Labour Party.

He was elected to the Norwegian Parliament from Sør-Trøndelag in 1973, and was re-elected on three occasions.

On the local level he was a deputy member of the executive committee of the municipal council of Trondheim Municipality from 1971 to 1975.

Outside politics he spent large parts of his career in Norway Post, before rounding off his career a labour bureaucrat in Sør-Trøndelag.
