= Oddmund Hoel =

Norwegian politician (1910–1983)

Oddmund Hoel (18 January 1910 – 26 November 1983) was a Norwegian politician for the Liberal Party.

He was born in Opdal.

He was elected to the Norwegian Parliament from Sør-Trøndelag in 1954, and was re-elected on two occasions.

On the local level Hoel was a member of the municipal council of Oppdal Municipality from 1945 to 1959.

Outside politics he worked as a police sergeant (1930–1941, 1945–1975) and a lawyer (1941–1945, 1975–1983), having graduated as cand.jur. in 1941. He also had a military career.
