= Magnar G. Huseby =

Norwegian engineer and politician

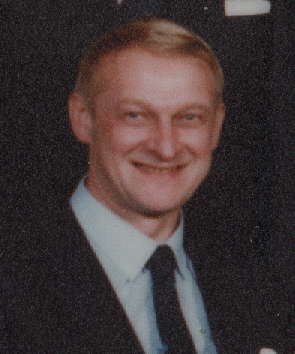
A picture of Magnar G. Huseby

Magnar Gunnbjørn Huseby (14 December 1928 – 2 July 2011) was a Norwegian engineer and politician for the Conservative Party.

He was born in Åsen as a son of Nils Husby (1890–1964), who managed an electricity works. His mother Gurine Olsen Lund (1896–1989) was a housewife, but also a cafe owner. Magnar Huseby followed in his father's footsteps. He finished his secondary education in Levanger in 1948, was an apprentice from 1947 to 1950 and attended Trondheim Technical School from 1950 to 1952. He then worked as an engineer in Trondheim Energiverk from 1952 to 1979.

He was a member of the municipal council of Trondheim Municipality from 1967 to 1983, serving as kommunalråd from 1979 to 1981. He was also a school board member from 1971 to 1975. He served as a deputy representative to the Parliament of Norway from Sør-Trøndelag during the term 1977–1981. He was then elected in the 1981 Norwegian parliamentary election and re-elected in the 1985 Norwegian parliamentary election. During both terms he was a member of the Standing Committee on Local Government and the Environment.

He was very active in the Norwegian Society of Engineers and Technologists and became an honorary member in 1981. He was elected to his first position here in 1953, and ended his last tenure in 1994. He was a board member from 1964 to 1968, then a supervisory council member until 1980 (chairing it from 1973 to 1976). He was also active in the Norwegian Polytechnic Society, where he received honorary membership of the local branch in 1997.

After retiring from the professional life in 1994 he was engaged in the well-being of pensioners. He was deputy chair of Ung i dag, gammel i morgen from 1994 to 1998, board member of the Norwegian Pensioners' Association from 2002 to 2007 and a member of the National Council of Senior Citizens from 2002 to 2006. He was also a lay judge in Trondheim City Court and Frostating Court of Appeal between 1995 and 1999. He died in July 2011.
