= Harald Ellefsen =

Norwegian politician (born 1950)

Harald Ellefsen (born 11 December 1950) is a Norwegian jurist and politician for the Conservative Party.

== Early life and political career ==
He was born in Oslo, took his secondary education in Trondheim, enrolled as a student in 1970 and graduated as cand.jur. in 1976. He spent time from 1971 to 1972 in Drew University. He worked as a part-time journalist in Adresseavisen and Aftenposten between 1971 and 1976, and was a police superintendent in Trondheim from 1977 to 1978. He was then a deputy judge in Onsøy for a year. He returned to Trondheim as chief superintendent from 1980 to 1988, and he also edited the magazine Politiembetsmennenes Blad. He worked as a police inspector from 1988 to 1997 and then lawyer.

Ellefsen was a member of Trondheim city council from 1975 to 1978. He was elected to the Norwegian Parliament from Sør-Trøndelag in 1985, and was re-elected on two occasions. He had previously served in the position of deputy representative during the term 1981–1985, but halfway during this term he moved up as a regular representative following the death of Hermund Eian.

Ellefsen has been a member of the board of the Politiembetsmennenes landsforening (1979–1983), Adresseavisen (1993–2001), the National Insurance Scheme Fund (1998–) and Statskog SF (2005–).
