= Johan Sigurd Karlsen =

Norwegian politician (1894–1967)

Johan Sigurd Karlsen (5 May 1894 – 11 June 1967) was a Norwegian politician for the Labour Party.

He was born in Fredrikstad.

He was elected to the Norwegian Parliament from Sør-Trøndelag in 1954, and was re-elected on two occasions.

Karlsen was mayor of Strinda Municipality for a brief time in 1945, and deputy mayor from 1945–1947.
