= Håkon Johnsen =

Norwegian politician (1914–1991)

Håkon Armand Menzoni Johnsen (3 March 1914 – 17 October 1991) was a Norwegian politician for the Labour Party.

He was born in Trondheim.

He was elected to the Norwegian Parliament from the Market towns of Sør-Trøndelag and Nord-Trøndelag counties in 1945, and was re-elected on six occasions. From 1969 to 1973 he was President of the Odelsting.

Johnsen was a member of Trondheim city council in 1937–1940, 1945–1947, 1947–1951 and 1951–1955. He was chairman of Arbeidernes Ungdomslag in Trondheim from 1932 to 1935, and of the county chapter of the Workers' Youth League from 1937 to 1938.
