= Finnmark (Storting constituency) =

Constituency of the Storting, the national legislature of Norway

- Finnmárku; Finmarkku
- Constituency for the Storting
- Location of Finnmark within Norway
- Municipality: List: Alta; Berlevåg; Båtsfjord; Gamvik; Hammerfest; Hassvik; Kárášjohka or Karasjok; Guovdageaidnu or Kautokeino; Lebesby; Loppa; Måsøy; Unjárga or Nesseby; Nordkapp; Porsanger or Porsángu or Porsanki; Sør-Varanger; Deatnu or Tana; Vadsø; Vardø
- County: Finnmark
- Population: 75,053 (2024)
- Electorate: 54,610 (2025)
- Area: 48,638 km^{2} (2024)

Current constituency
- Created: 1921
- Seats: List: 3 (2025–present); 4 (1953–2025); 3 (1921–1953)
- Members of the Storting: List: Siren Julianne Jensen (MDG); Marianne Sivertsen Næss (Ap); Sigurd Kvammen Rafaelsen (Ap); Bengt Rune Strifeldt (FrP)
- Created from: List: West Finnmark; East Finnmark

Finnmark (Northern Sami: Finnmárku; Kven: Finmarkku) is one of the 19 multi-member constituencies of the Storting, which is the national legislature of Norway. The constituency was established in 1921 following the introduction of proportional representation for elections to the Storting. It is conterminous with the county of Finnmark. The constituency currently elects eight of the 169 members of the Storting using the open party-list proportional representation electoral system. At the 2025 parliamentary election Finnmark had 54,610 registered electors.

== Electoral system ==
Finnmark currently elects three of the 169 members of the Storting using the open (Note: Although technically elections to the Storting have open lists, they are in effect closed lists as a majority of those voting for a party must make changes to the lists for the changes to take effect, which has never happened since the introduction of proportional representation in 1921, and as result candidates are elected in the order submitted by the party.) party-list proportional representation electoral system. Constituency seats are allocated by the County Electoral Committee using the Modified Sainte-Laguë method. Compensatory seats (seats at large) are calculated based on the national vote and are allocated by the National Electoral Committee using the Modified Sainte-Laguë method at the constituency level (one for each constituency). Only parties that reach the 4% national threshold compete for compensatory seats.

== Election results ==
=== Summary ===
Election	Communists NKP / K			Socialist Left SV / SF			Labour Ap			Greens MDG			Centre Sp / Bp / L			Liberals V			Christian Democrats KrF			Conservatives H			Progress FrP / ALP		
Election	Votes	%	Seats	Votes	%	Seats	Votes	%	Seats	Votes	%	Seats	Votes	%	Seats	Votes	%	Seats	Votes	%	Seats	Votes	%	Seats	Votes	%	Seats
2025				2,080	5.20%	0	11,241	28.12%	2	861	2.15%	0	2,188	5.47%	0	490	1.23%	0	831	2.08%	0	2,374	5.94%	0	9,783	24.47%	1
2021				2,415	6.20%	0	12,228	31.37%	2	892	2.29%	0	7,157	18.36%	1	564	1.45%	0	648	1.66%	0	2,664	6.83%	0	4,220	10.83%	0
2017				3,437	8.83%	0	12,440	31.97%	2	836	2.15%	0	5,790	14.88%	1	1,644	4.23%	0	808	2.08%	0	5,600	14.39%	0	6,994	17.98%	1
2013				1,952	5.18%	0	15,003	39.84%	2	844	2.24%	0	1,403	3.73%	0	1,359	3.61%	0	1,117	2.97%	0	8,032	21.33%	1	6,038	16.03%	1
2009				2,989	8.06%	0	16,834	45.38%	3	77	0.21%	0	1,613	4.35%	0	847	2.28%	0	1,026	2.77%	0	3,970	10.70%	0	8,277	22.31%	1
2005	87	0.23%	0	4,768	12.87%	1	14,937	40.32%	2				2,263	6.11%	0	826	2.23%	0	1,495	4.04%	0	3,439	9.28%	0	6,564	17.72%	1
2001	140	0.38%	0	6,806	18.47%	1	9,877	26.80%	2	34	0.09%	0	1,582	4.29%	0	621	1.68%	0	4,329	11.75%	0	5,803	15.74%	1	3,868	10.49%	0
1997	195	0.50%	0	5,624	14.36%	1	14,213	36.30%	2	78	0.20%	0	3,771	9.63%	0	1,327	3.39%	0	5,075	12.96%	1	4,350	11.11%	0	3,974	10.15%	0
1993				6,749	17.48%	1	15,301	39.63%	2				7,183	18.61%	1	1,513	3.92%	0	1,681	4.35%	0	4,827	12.50%	0	770	1.99%	0
1989				5,706	13.90%	1	14,958	36.44%	2	140	0.34%	0	727	1.77%	0	627	1.53%	0	1,839	4.48%	0	5,079	12.37%	0	2,704	6.59%	0
1985	457	1.08%	0	3,133	7.40%	0	24,978	59.03%	3				943	2.23%	0	901	2.13%	0	2,084	4.93%	0	8,747	20.67%	1	604	1.43%	0
1981	640	1.56%	0	3,201	7.81%	0	20,018	48.87%	3				3,845^{1}	9.39%^{1}	0	1,260	3.08%	0	3,845^{1}	9.39%^{1}	0	10,422	25.44%	1	543	1.33%	0
1977	783	2.05%	0	2,748	7.18%	0	21,056	55.03%	3							5,587^{1}	14.60%^{1}	0	5,587^{1}	14.60%^{1}	0	6,788	17.74%	1	362	0.95%	0
1973				6,807	19.12%	1	15,639	43.93%	2				3,465^{1}	6.82%^{1}	0	3,465^{1}	6.82%^{1}	0	2,397	6.73%	0	4,612	12.95%	1	1,205	3.38%	0
1969	1,474	4.05%	0	2,116	5.82%	0	22,315	61.34%	3				932	2.56%	0	1,380	3.79%	0	1,246	3.42%	0	6,392	17.57%	1			
1965	2,424	7.14%	0	2,214	6.52%	0	18,881	55.64%	3							1,769	5.21%	0	1,433	4.22%	0	7,219	21.27%	1			
1961	3,704	12.10%	0				18,990	62.02%	3							2,133	6.97%	0				5,762	18.82%	1			
1957	3,804	12.94%	0				18,117	61.62%	3							5,884^{1}	15.46%^{1}	0	1,595	5.43%	0	5,884^{1}	15.46%^{1}	1			
1953	5,120	18.04%	1				15,516	54.66%	2							1,471	5.18%	0	1,640	5.78%	0	4,638	16.34%	1			
1949	3,469	16.77%	0				12,583	60.82%	3							1,848	8.93%	0				2,789	13.48%	0			
1945	2,271	21.46%	1				6,021	60.48%	2							682	7.17%	0				930	10.89%	0			
1936							11,235	58.69%	2							3,370^{1}	17.65%^{1}	0				3,767^{1}	19.68%^{1}	1			
1933	1,408	8.57%	0				8,020	48.80%	2							2,965	18.06%	0				4,026	24.52%	1			
1930	593	4.19%	0				5,126	36.21%	1							3,377	23.85%	1				5,061	35.75%	1			
1927	1,307	11.86%	0				5,629	51.09%	2							2,048	18.59%	18.59%				2,033	18.45%	0			
1924	1,284	13.29%	0				2,055	21.26%	1							1,814	18.77%	1				2,876	29.76%	1			
1921							2,261	24.50%	1							3,081	33.39%	1				2,560	27.74%	1			

(Excludes compensatory seats. Figures in italics represent joint lists.)

=== Detailed ===
==== 2020s ====
===== 2025 =====
Results of the 2025 parliamentary election held on 8 September 2025:

Party		Votes	%	Seats		
Party		Votes	%	Con.	Com.	Tot.
Labour Party	Ap	11,241	28.12%	2	0	2
Progress Party	FrP	9,783	24.47%	1	0	1
Patient Focus	PF	4,174	10.44%	0	0	0
Red Party	R	3,930	9.83%	0	0	0
Conservative Party	H	2,374	5.94%	0	0	0
Centre Party	Sp	2,188	5.47%	0	0	0
Socialist Left Party	SV	2,080	5.20%	0	0	0
Green Party	MDG	861	2.15%	0	1	1
Christian Democratic Party	KrF	831	2.08%	0	0	0
Liberal Party	V	490	1.23%	0	0	0
Conservative	K	486	1.22%	0	0	0
Industry and Business Party	INP	401	1.00%	0	0	0
Generation Party	GP	390	0.98%	0	0	0
Norway Democrats	ND	343	0.86%	0	0	0
Peace and Justice	FOR	153	0.38%	0	0	0
DNI Party	DNI	152	0.38%	0	0	0
Welfare and Innovation Party	VIP	62	0.16%	0	0	0
Partiet Sentrum	S	38	0.10%	0	0	0
Valid votes		39,977	100.00%	3	1	4
Blank votes		512	0.94%			
Rejected votes – other		79	0.14%			
Total polled		40,568	74.29%			
Registered electors		54,610				

The following candidates were elected: Siren Julianne Jensen (MDG); Marianne Sivertsen Næss (Ap); Sigurd Kvammen Rafaelsen (Ap); and Bengt Rune Strifeldt (FrP).

Votes by municipality
Party		Votes per municipality																		Total Votes
Party		Alta	Berl.	Båts.	Deat.	Gam.	Guov.	Hamm.	Hass.	Kárá.	Lebe.	Lopp.	Mås.	Nord.	Pors.	S.-Var.	Unjá.	Vad.	Var.	Total Votes
Labour Party	Ap	1,691	189	273	387	144	188	2,339	154	288	223	137	180	473	681	1,946	168	1,392	388	11,241
Progress Party	FrP	3,020	113	342	394	132	233	1,474	113	208	130	141	126	485	651	1,322	91	580	228	9,783
Patient Focus	PF	3,519	5	3	79	9	282	24	7	48	17	22	7	11	32	55	19	27	8	4,174
Red Party	R	711	36	54	217	36	320	463	43	466	80	39	34	130	248	589	81	284	99	3,930
Conservative Party	H	566	24	53	78	7	67	387	23	66	42	35	32	121	199	379	24	234	37	2,374
Centre Party	Sp	305	29	50	172	39	79	245	60	131	47	29	58	95	174	314	35	218	108	2,188
Socialist Left Party	SV	431	32	22	94	41	109	277	18	90	23	23	16	135	94	358	49	214	54	2,080
Green Party	MDG	311	2	7	26	5	27	137	8	18	6	5	10	25	36	133	3	77	25	861
Christian Democratic Party	KrF	263	1	10	37	1	166	69	8	41	24	2	9	13	34	75	4	67	7	831
Liberal Party	V	172	1	13	15	2	43	41	6	9	3	4	4	22	19	76	5	42	13	490
Conservative	K	271	0	3	11	3	33	57	2	10	20	3	0	5	18	20	7	18	5	486
Industry and Business Party	INP	99	2	9	20	16	12	99	7	19	4	4	12	13	25	30	4	18	8	401
Generation Party	GP	117	3	10	18	0	11	78	2	22	5	5	4	13	29	36	5	26	6	390
Norway Democrats	ND	71	1	12	23	7	7	63	12	7	6	4	3	19	24	41	7	20	16	343
Peace and Justice	FOR	21	0	5	6	2	1	18	0	8	2	7	1	6	2	45	3	19	7	153
DNI Party	DNI	27	0	4	6	0	2	45	4	4	1	7	2	5	6	26	4	6	3	152
Welfare and Innovation Party	VIP	9	1	3	2	0	2	13	2	5	0	0	0	2	7	8	1	5	2	62
Partiet Sentrum	S	15	0	0	3	0	1	3	0	6	1	0	1	1	1	4	1	1	0	38
Valid votes		11,619	439	873	1,588	444	1,583	5,832	469	1,446	634	467	499	1,574	2,280	5,457	511	3,248	1,014	39,977
Blank votes		94	8	15	22	8	15	90	9	18	9	5	6	26	48	69	8	44	18	512
Rejected votes – other		15	0	0	9	1	2	17	2	1	3	0	0	1	4	7	4	0	13	79
Total polled		11,728	447	888	1,619	453	1,600	5,939	480	1,465	646	472	505	1,601	2,332	5,533	523	3,292	1,045	40,568
Registered electors		15,642	627	1,303	2,138	643	2,147	8,148	649	2,006	872	611	743	2,181	3,132	7,428	673	4,296	1,371	54,610
Turnout		74.98%	71.29%	68.15%	75.72%	70.45%	74.52%	72.89%	73.96%	73.03%	74.08%	77.25%	67.97%	73.41%	74.46%	74.49%	77.71%	76.63%	76.22%	74.29%

===== 2021 =====
Results of the 2021 parliamentary election held on 13 September 2021:

Party		Votes	%	Seats		
Party		Votes	%	Con.	Com.	Tot.
Labour Party	Ap	12,228	31.37%	2	0	2
Centre Party	Sp	7,157	18.36%	1	0	1
Patient Focus	PF	4,950	12.70%	1	0	1
Progress Party	FrP	4,220	10.83%	0	1	1
Conservative Party	H	2,664	6.83%	0	0	0
Socialist Left Party	SV	2,415	6.20%	0	0	0
Red Party	R	1,959	5.03%	0	0	0
Green Party	MDG	892	2.29%	0	0	0
Democrats in Norway		667	1.71%	0	0	0
Christian Democratic Party	KrF	648	1.66%	0	0	0
Liberal Party	V	564	1.45%	0	0	0
Industry and Business Party	INP	179	0.46%	0	0	0
The Christians	PDK	138	0.35%	0	0	0
Health Party		113	0.29%	0	0	0
Capitalist Party	Lib	70	0.18%	0	0	0
Partiet Sentrum	S	69	0.18%	0	0	0
Alliance - Alternative for Norway		50	0.13%	0	0	0
Valid votes		38,983	100.00%	4	1	5
Blank votes		316	0.58%			
Rejected votes – other		57	0.10%			
Total polled		39,356	72.06%			
Registered electors		54,617				

The following candidates were elected: Geir Adelsten Iversen (Sp); Marianne Sivertsen Næss (Ap); Irene Ojala (PF); Runar Sjåstad (Ap); and Bengt Rune Strifeldt (FrP).

Votes by municipality
Party		Votes per municipality																		Total Votes
Party		Alta	Berl.	Båts.	Deat.	Gam.	Guov.	Hamm.	Hass.	Kárá.	Lebe.	Lopp.	Mås.	Nord.	Pors.	S.-Var.	Unjá.	Vad.	Var.	Total Votes
Labour Party	Ap	1,385	204	334	495	198	200	2,828	155	447	242	172	240	588	721	2,062	203	1,363	391	12,228
Centre Party	Sp	813	90	229	475	154	422	725	133	546	150	76	151	370	522	1,039	159	802	301	7,157
Patient Focus	PF	4,395	1	3	9	4	426	16	4	22	1	10	3	7	16	16	0	14	3	4,950
Progress Party	FrP	1,646	47	128	199	44	66	505	69	52	77	74	42	162	254	570	32	160	93	4,220
Conservative Party	H	530	44	78	102	13	91	444	28	57	37	55	64	121	240	422	41	243	54	2,664
Socialist Left Party	SV	422	49	27	84	38	55	406	22	77	47	29	11	169	139	500	29	208	103	2,415
Red Party	R	542	14	31	83	25	62	238	21	119	35	21	19	41	122	297	35	194	60	1,959
Green Party	MDG	332	2	11	34	6	27	119	4	27	6	9	5	25	39	112	11	96	27	892
Democrats in Norway		132	4	22	63	4	15	134	11	15	14	16	10	52	45	76	8	25	21	667
Christian Democratic Party	KrF	256	1	4	20	2	38	107	6	23	22	5	3	13	25	61	4	52	6	648
Liberal Party	V	225	2	11	26	2	51	42	4	11	4	3	3	20	27	76	6	41	10	564
Industry and Business Party	INP	19	1	3	6	3	5	82	1	1	4	2	3	3	12	14	2	16	2	179
The Christians	PDK	37	0	1	5	3	18	13	1	7	13	0	0	1	13	12	5	5	4	138
Health Party		53	0	2	4	0	10	14	1	2	1	0	0	1	5	6	0	8	6	113
Capitalist Party	Lib	21	0	1	5	2	3	12	0	1	2	3	0	2	7	3	0	8	0	70
Partiet Sentrum	S	26	0	2	4	0	2	2	1	4	2	0	1	3	4	9	1	8	0	69
Alliance - Alternative for Norway		11	2	2	2	0	0	16	1	1	2	2	0	1	6	2	0	2	0	50
Valid votes		10,845	461	889	1,616	498	1,491	5,703	462	1,412	659	477	555	1,579	2,197	5,277	536	3,245	1,081	38,983
Blank votes		67	5	12	13	4	8	62	6	9	4	1	6	20	27	43	5	15	9	316
Rejected votes – other		12	2	1	5	1	0	6	0	5	0	0	2	9	3	4	0	6	1	57
Total polled		10,924	468	902	1,634	503	1,499	5,771	468	1,426	663	478	563	1,608	2,227	5,324	541	3,266	1,091	39,356
Registered electors		15,073	685	1,371	2,226	685	2,138	8,092	642	2,053	901	661	839	2,242	3,119	7,446	698	4,310	1,436	54,617
Turnout		72.47%	68.32%	65.79%	73.41%	73.43%	70.11%	71.32%	72.90%	69.46%	73.58%	72.31%	67.10%	71.72%	71.40%	71.50%	77.51%	75.78%	75.97%	75.05%

==== 2010s ====
===== 2017 =====
Results of the 2017 parliamentary election held on 11 September 2017:

Party		Votes	%	Seats		
Party		Votes	%	Con.	Com.	Tot.
Labour Party	Ap	12,440	31.97%	2	0	2
Progress Party	FrP	6,994	17.98%	1	0	1
Centre Party	Sp	5,790	14.88%	1	0	1
Conservative Party	H	5,600	14.39%	0	1	1
Socialist Left Party	SV	3,437	8.83%	0	0	0
Liberal Party	V	1,644	4.23%	0	0	0
Green Party	MDG	836	2.15%	0	0	0
Christian Democratic Party	KrF	808	2.08%	0	0	0
Red Party	R	602	1.55%	0	0	0
Coastal Party	KP	166	0.43%	0	0	0
The Christians	PDK	141	0.36%	0	0	0
Health Party		139	0.36%	0	0	0
Capitalist Party	Lib	86	0.22%	0	0	0
The Alliance		86	0.22%	0	0	0
Pirate Party of Norway	PIR	76	0.20%	0	0	0
Democrats in Norway		71	0.18%	0	0	0
Valid votes		38,909	100.00%	4	1	5
Blank votes		377	0.70%			
Rejected votes – other		95	0.18%			
Total polled		39,381	72.79%			
Registered electors		54,099				

The following candidates were elected: Frank Bakke-Jensen (H); Geir Adelsten Iversen (Sp); Ingalill Olsen (Ap); Runar Sjåstad (Ap); and Bengt Rune Strifeldt (FrP).

Votes by municipality
Party		Votes per municipality																			Total Votes
Party		Alta	Berl.	Båts.	Deat.	Gam.	Guov.	Hamm.	Hass.	Kárá.	Kval.	Lebe.	Lopp.	Mås.	Nord.	Pors.	S.-Var.	Unjá.	Vad.	Var.	Total Votes
Labour Party	Ap	1,698	199	352	496	216	342	2,329	194	439	178	243	178	241	638	737	2,028	188	1,346	398	12,440
Progress Party	FrP	3,417	75	155	251	67	123	634	48	81	107	94	85	73	231	356	751	47	275	124	6,994
Centre Party	Sp	1,496	45	93	370	88	497	325	95	513	74	121	84	99	187	313	643	91	411	245	5,790
Conservative Party	H	1,020	80	222	221	39	206	894	73	123	87	81	92	93	262	473	872	61	594	107	5,600
Socialist Left Party	SV	707	27	37	201	59	87	510	25	122	36	54	38	18	183	156	575	119	411	72	3,437
Liberal Party	V	1,205	2	11	29	7	70	67	4	36	12	12	2	8	21	19	79	7	29	24	1,644
Green Party	MDG	277	8	13	28	6	19	92	10	25	10	17	12	7	19	36	128	5	67	57	836
Christian Democratic Party	KrF	332	2	2	21	4	62	73	7	57	20	25	9	4	11	36	73	6	61	3	808
Red Party	R	213	11	10	21	6	11	62	1	17	9	10	6	8	14	28	96	13	49	17	602
Coastal Party	KP	58	2	7	3	4	1	19	1	0	2	11	8	0	3	8	14	3	8	14	166
The Christians	PDK	47	0	0	8	1	18	9	1	3	1	4	1	0	2	11	16	6	11	2	141
Health Party		20	3	4	4	1	6	35	1	5	1	3	0	3	4	11	23	0	13	2	139
Capitalist Party	Lib	30	0	2	5	1	7	10	0	4	0	0	0	0	2	12	5	1	6	1	86
The Alliance		10	2	2	3	0	3	11	1	4	0	5	0	0	5	9	16	0	4	4	79
Pirate Party of Norway	PIR	15	1	1	2	2	11	8	1	4	1	0	3	1	5	6	9	1	3	2	76
Democrats in Norway		5	0	0	1	0	0	13	0	9	2	2	4	1	11	2	12	1	3	5	71
Valid votes		10,550	457	911	1,664	501	1,463	5,091	462	1,442	540	682	522	556	1,598	2,213	5,340	549	3,291	1,077	38,909
Blank votes		101	4	11	15	6	13	50	7	16	6	5	3	7	11	18	53	2	20	29	377
Rejected votes – other		10	0	3	4	2	0	24	1	1	3	1	1	1	9	0	26	1	7	1	95
Total polled		10,661	461	925	1,683	509	1,476	5,165	470	1,459	549	688	526	564	1,618	2,231	5,419	552	3,318	1,107	39,381
Registered electors		14,429	714	1,391	2,211	707	2,165	7,194	680	2,072	793	943	720	882	2,350	3,046	7,283	704	4,297	1,518	54,099
Turnout		73.89%	64.57%	66.50%	76.12%	71.99%	68.18%	71.80%	69.12%	70.42%	69.23%	72.96%	73.06%	63.95%	68.85%	73.24%	74.41%	78.41%	77.22%	72.92%	72.79%

===== 2013 =====
Results of the 2013 parliamentary election held on 11 September 2017:

Party		Votes	%	Seats		
Party		Votes	%	Con.	Com.	Tot.
Labour Party	Ap	15,003	39.84%	2	0	2
Conservative Party	H	8,032	21.33%	1	0	1
Progress Party	FrP	6,038	16.03%	1	0	1
Socialist Left Party	SV	1,952	5.18%	0	1	1
Centre Party	Sp	1,403	3.73%	0	0	0
Liberal Party	V	1,359	3.61%	0	0	0
Christian Democratic Party	KrF	1,117	2.97%	0	0	0
Green Party	MDG	844	2.24%	0	0	0
Coastal Party	KP	550	1.46%	0	0	0
Hospital to Alta		467	1.24%	0	0	0
Red Party	R	351	0.93%	0	0	0
The Christians	PDK	335	0.89%	0	0	0
Pirate Party of Norway	PIR	144	0.38%	0	0	0
Christian Unity Party	KSP	41	0.11%	0	0	0
Democrats in Norway		23	0.06%	0	0	0
Valid votes		37,659	100.00%	4	1	5
Blank votes		290	0.54%			
Rejected votes – other		94	0.18%			
Total polled		38,043	71.36%			
Registered electors		53,310				

The following candidates were elected: Frank Bakke-Jensen (H); Kirsti Bergstø (SV); Jan-Henrik Fredriksen (FrP); Helga Pedersen (Ap); and Kåre Simensen (Ap).

Votes by municipality
Party		Votes per municipality																			Total Votes
Party		Alta	Berl.	Båts.	Deat.	Gam.	Guov.	Hamm.	Hass.	Kárá.	Kval.	Lebe.	Lopp.	Mås.	Nord.	Pors.	S.-Var.	Unjá.	Vad.	Var.	Total Votes
Labour Party	Ap	3,114	242	439	593	238	357	2,453	237	583	229	237	208	248	727	780	2,127	197	1,474	520	15,003
Conservative Party	H	1,850	125	330	395	67	372	965	77	259	116	123	109	139	370	593	1,107	81	785	169	8,032
Progress Party	FrP	2,007	76	123	179	103	113	751	63	79	129	130	109	95	281	377	830	56	290	247	6,038
Socialist Left Party	SV	419	26	22	97	27	49	219	10	57	32	37	31	9	105	91	343	83	239	56	1,952
Centre Party	Sp	229	7	14	158	16	78	94	53	162	18	38	18	62	39	74	215	36	67	25	1,403
Liberal Party	V	580	10	10	32	17	128	74	5	77	12	15	17	10	30	43	130	14	114	41	1,359
Christian Democratic Party	KrF	364	5	4	47	7	135	103	7	65	16	38	14	10	16	62	106	15	89	14	1,117
Green Party	MDG	229	11	6	51	10	58	111	13	57	6	18	15	4	13	41	90	13	82	16	844
Coastal Party	KP	200	11	13	13	15	0	58	4	3	7	16	40	6	12	19	70	3	23	37	550
Hospital to Alta		370	1	0	2	1	74	1	1	8	0	1	2	0	2	1	1	2	0	0	467
Red Party	R	93	3	3	10	1	15	47	2	12	6	12	2	7	10	19	56	8	36	9	351
The Christians	PDK	104	0	4	17	3	37	31	5	16	1	7	5	0	10	26	32	6	28	3	335
Pirate Party of Norway	PIR	33	2	4	1	3	11	25	1	8	3	1	0	1	5	10	15	0	17	4	144
Christian Unity Party	KSP	6	0	0	6	0	14	0	0	1	4	1	0	0	1	2	4	0	1	1	41
Democrats in Norway		2	0	1	2	0	1	6	1	2	0	1	0	0	1	0	1	0	2	3	23
Valid votes		9,600	519	973	1,603	508	1,442	4,938	479	1,389	579	675	570	591	1,622	2,138	5,127	514	3,247	1,145	37,659
Blank votes		63	7	9	9	3	18	54	2	17	4	6	2	8	6	10	28	4	29	11	290
Rejected votes – other		8	5	4	2	4	4	9	1	6	1	3	1	0	5	4	17	0	8	12	94
Total polled		9,671	531	986	1,614	515	1,464	5,001	482	1,412	584	684	573	599	1,633	2,152	5,172	518	3,284	1,168	38,043
Registered electors		13,683	776	1,406	2,162	736	2,193	7,031	682	2,036	826	951	802	904	2,340	3,037	7,152	703	4,284	1,606	53,310
Turnout		70.68%	68.43%	70.13%	74.65%	69.97%	66.76%	71.13%	70.67%	69.35%	70.70%	71.92%	71.45%	66.26%	69.79%	70.86%	72.32%	73.68%	76.66%	72.73%	71.36%

==== 2000s ====
===== 2009 =====
Results of the 2009 parliamentary election held on 13 and 14 September 2009:

Party		Votes	%	Seats		
Party		Votes	%	Con.	Com.	Tot.
Labour Party	Ap	16,834	45.38%	3	0	3
Progress Party	FrP	8,277	22.31%	1	0	1
Conservative Party	H	3,970	10.70%	0	1	1
Socialist Left Party	SV	2,989	8.06%	0	0	0
Centre Party	Sp	1,613	4.35%	0	0	0
Christian Democratic Party	KrF	1,026	2.77%	0	0	0
Coastal Party	KP	976	2.63%	0	0	0
Liberal Party	V	847	2.28%	0	0	0
Red Party	R	299	0.81%	0	0	0
Christian Unity Party	KSP	163	0.44%	0	0	0
Green Party	MDG	77	0.21%	0	0	0
Democrats in Norway		26	0.07%	0	0	0
Valid votes		37,097	100.00%	4	1	5
Total polled		37,097	70.41%			
Registered electors		52,686				

The following candidates were elected: Frank Bakke-Jensen (H); Jan-Henrik Fredriksen (FrP); Ingalill Olsen (Ap); Helga Pedersen (Ap); and Kåre Simensen (Ap).

Votes by municipality
Party		Votes per municipality																			Total Votes
Party		Alta	Berl.	Båts.	Deat.	Gam.	Guov.	Hamm.	Hass.	Kárá.	Kval.	Lebe.	Lopp.	Mås.	Nord.	Pors.	S.-Var.	Unjá.	Vad.	Var.	Total Votes
Labour Party	Ap	3,542	290	501	699	279	600	2,398	285	659	261	329	244	328	742	898	2,420	254	1,527	578	16,834
Progress Party	FrP	2,508	116	171	335	115	191	1,025	69	171	169	157	158	149	340	641	1,085	100	513	264	8,277
Conservative Party	H	816	69	229	177	45	160	558	39	88	33	43	37	88	192	276	504	62	459	95	3,970
Socialist Left Party	SV	818	35	40	134	31	72	308	21	103	40	46	50	32	150	127	455	94	354	79	2,989
Centre Party	Sp	430	7	21	122	26	146	138	44	101	18	29	43	43	56	78	186	17	88	20	1,613
Christian Democratic Party	KrF	356	5	9	40	12	102	91	13	56	15	27	10	6	18	50	98	19	85	14	1,026
Coastal Party	KP	427	14	17	13	17	2	142	11	3	21	22	37	8	26	11	65	0	48	92	976
Liberal Party	V	182	6	8	32	5	103	46	9	205	2	7	5	3	17	34	91	10	64	18	847
Red Party	R	63	9	7	11	3	5	48	2	4	11	12	5	5	14	22	40	4	24	10	299
Christian Unity Party	KSP	58	0	3	4	0	37	9	1	6	2	3	5	0	3	6	11	2	13	0	163
Green Party	MDG	24	0	4	4	0	3	10	3	1	2	1	0	0	5	6	7	0	5	2	77
Democrats in Norway		9	0	0	1	0	0	3	0	0	5	1	0	0	1	0	2	0	4	0	26
Valid votes		9,233	551	1,010	1,572	533	1,421	4,776	497	1,397	579	677	594	662	1,564	2,149	4,964	562	3,184	1,172	37,097
Registered electors		13,003	785	1,455	2,192	767	2,211	6,861	716	2,000	830	979	859	957	2,360	3,068	7,009	699	4,278	1,657	52,686
Turnout		71.01%	70.19%	69.42%	71.72%	69.49%	64.27%	69.61%	69.41%	69.85%	69.76%	69.15%	69.15%	69.17%	66.27%	70.05%	70.82%	80.40%	74.43%	70.73%	70.41%

==== 2005 ====
Results of the 2005 parliamentary election held on 11–12 September 2005:

Party		Votes	%	Seats		
Party		Votes	%	Con.	Com.	Tot.
Labour Party	Ap	14,937	40.32%	2	0	2
Progress Party	FrP	6,564	17.72%	1	0	1
Socialist Left Party	SV	4,768	12.87%	1	0	1
Conservative Party	H	3,439	9.28%	0	0	0
Centre Party	Sp	2,263	6.11%	0	0	0
Coastal Party	KP	1,605	4.33%	0	0	0
Christian Democratic Party	KrF	1,495	4.04%	0	0	0
Liberal Party	V	826	2.23%	0	1	1
Sámi People's Party	SáB	659	1.78%	0	0	0
Red Electoral Alliance	RV	303	0.82%	0	0	0
Communist Party of Norway	K	87	0.23%	0	0	0
Christian Unity Party	KSP	74	0.20%	0	0	0
Democrats in Norway		27	0.07%	0	0	0
Valid votes		37,047	100.00%	4	1	5
Total polled		37,047	69.96%			
Registered electors		52,958				

The following candidates were elected: Olav Gunnar Ballo (SV); Jan-Henrik Fredriksen (FrP); Vera Lysklætt (V); Eva M. Nielsen (Ap); and Karl Eirik Schjøtt-Pedersen (Ap).

==== 2001 ====
Results of the 2001 parliamentary election held on 9–10 September 2001:

Party		Votes	%	Seats		
Party		Votes	%	Con.	Com.	Tot.
Labour Party	Ap	9,877	26.80%	2	0	2
Socialist Left Party	SV	6,806	18.47%	1	0	1
Conservative Party	H	5,803	15.74%	1	0	1
Christian Democratic Party	KrF	4,329	11.75%	0	0	0
Progress Party	FrP	3,868	10.49%	0	0	0
Coastal Party	KP	2,357	6.39%	0	0	0
Centre Party	Sp	1,582	4.29%	0	0	0
Liberal Party	V	621	1.68%	0	0	0
County Lists		564	1.53%	0	0	0
Christian Unity Party	KSP	329	0.89%	0	0	0
Red Electoral Alliance	RV	302	0.82%	0	0	0
The Political Party	DPP	189	0.51%	0	0	0
Communist Party of Norway	K	140	0.38%	0	0	0
Green Party	MDG	34	0.09%	0	0	0
Norwegian People's Party	NFP	29	0.08%	0	0	0
Fatherland Party	FLP	27	0.07%	0	0	0
Valid votes		36,857	100.00%	4	0	4
Total polled		36,857	68.89%			
Registered electors		53,502				

The following candidates were elected: Olav Gunnar Ballo (SV); Eva M. Nielsen (Ap); Raymond Robertsen (H); and Karl Eirik Schjøtt-Pedersen (Ap).

=== 1990s ===
==== 1997 ====
Results of the 1997 parliamentary election held on 15 September 1997:

Party		Votes	%	Seats		
Party		Votes	%	Con.	Com.	Tot.
Labour Party	Ap	14,213	36.30%	2	0	2
Socialist Left Party	SV	5,624	14.36%	1	0	1
Christian Democratic Party	KrF	5,075	12.96%	1	0	1
Conservative Party	H	4,350	11.11%	0	0	0
Progress Party	FrP	3,974	10.15%	0	0	0
Centre Party	Sp	3,771	9.63%	0	0	0
Liberal Party	V	1,327	3.39%	0	0	0
Red Electoral Alliance	RV	462	1.18%	0	0	0
Communist Party of Norway	K	195	0.50%	0	0	0
Green Party	MDG	78	0.20%	0	0	0
Fatherland Party	FLP	47	0.12%	0	0	0
Natural Law Party		40	0.10%	0	0	0
Valid votes		39,156	100.00%	4	0	4
Rejected votes		234	0.42%			
Total polled		39,390	70.35%			
Registered electors		55,992				

The following candidates were elected: Olav Gunnar Ballo (SV); Mimmi Bæivi (Ap); Randi Kristelig Karlstrøm (KrF); and Karl Eirik Schjøtt-Pedersen (Ap).

==== 1993 ====
Results of the 1993 parliamentary election held on 12 and 13 September 1993:

Party		Votes	%	Seats		
Party		Votes	%	Con.	Com.	Tot.
Labour Party	Ap	15,301	39.63%	2	0	2
Centre Party	Sp	7,183	18.61%	1	0	1
Socialist Left Party	SV	6,749	17.48%	1	0	1
Conservative Party	H	4,827	12.50%	0	0	0
Christian Democratic Party	KrF	1,681	4.35%	0	0	0
Liberal Party	V	1,513	3.92%	0	0	0
Progress Party	FrP	770	1.99%	0	0	0
Red Electoral Alliance	RV	186	0.48%	0	0	0
Fatherland Party	FLP	143	0.37%	0	0	0
Common Future		118	0.31%	0	0	0
New Future Coalition Party	SNF	95	0.25%	0	0	0
Natural Law Party		39	0.10%	0	0	0
Valid votes		38,605	100.00%	4	0	4
Rejected votes		306	0.53%			
Total polled		38,911	67.91%			
Registered electors		57,302				

The following candidates were elected: Mimmi Bæivi (Ap); Reidar Johansen (SV); Karl Eirik Schjøtt-Pedersen (Ap); and Johanne Sommersæter (Sp).

=== 1980s ===
==== 1989 ====
Results of the 1989 parliamentary election held on 10 and 11 September 1989:

Party		Votes	%	Seats		
Party		Votes	%	Con.	Com.	Tot.
Labour Party	Ap	14,958	36.44%	2	0	2
Future for Finnmark		8,817	21.48%	1	0	1
Socialist Left Party	SV	5,706	13.90%	1	0	1
Conservative Party	H	5,079	12.37%	0	0	0
Progress Party	FrP	2,704	6.59%	0	0	0
Christian Democratic Party	KrF	1,839	4.48%	0	0	0
Centre Party	Sp	727	1.77%	0	0	0
Liberal Party	V	627	1.53%	0	0	0
County Lists for Environment and Solidarity	FMS	338	0.82%	0	0	0
Green Party	MDG	140	0.34%	0	0	0
Stop Immigration	SI	108	0.26%	0	0	0
Valid votes		41,043	100.00%	4	0	4
Rejected votes		183	0.33%			
Total polled		41,226	74.31%			
Registered electors		55,477				

The following candidates were elected: Anders John Aune (Framtid for Finnmark); Reidar Johansen (SV); Oddrunn Pettersen (Ap); and Karl Eirik Schjøtt-Pedersen (Ap).

==== 1985 ====
Results of the 1985 parliamentary election held on 8 and 9 September 1985:

Party		Party			List Alliance		
Party		Votes	%	Seats	Votes	%	Seats
Labour Party	Ap	24,978	59.03%	3	24,978	59.21%	3
Conservative Party	H	8,747	20.67%	1	8,747	20.73%	1
Socialist Left Party	SV	3,133	7.40%	0	3,133	7.43%	0
Christian Democratic Party	KrF	2,084	4.93%	0	2,969	7.04%	0
Centre Party	Sp	943	2.23%	0	2,969	7.04%	0
Liberal People's Party	DLF	68	0.16%	0	2,969	7.04%	0
Liberal Party	V	901	2.13%	0	901	2.14%	0
Progress Party	FrP	604	1.43%	0	604	1.43%	0
Communist Party of Norway	K	457	1.08%	0	457	1.08%	0
Red Electoral Alliance	RV	324	0.77%	0	324	0.77%	0
Pensioners' Party	PP	72	0.17%	0	72	0.17%	0
Valid votes		42,311	100.00%	4	42,185	100.00%	4
Rejected votes		73	0.13%				
Total polled		42,384	76.77%				
Registered electors		55,211					

As the list alliance was not entitled to more seats contesting as an alliance than it was contesting as individual parties, the distribution of seats was as party votes.

The following candidates were elected: Steinar Eriksen (H); Oddvar J. Majala (Ap); Oddrunn Pettersen (Ap); and Karl Eirik Schjøtt-Pedersen (Ap).

==== 1981 ====
Results of the 1981 parliamentary election held on 13 and 14 September 1981:

Party		Votes	%	Seats
Labour Party	Ap	20,018	48.87%	3
Conservative Party	H	10,422	25.44%	1
Non-socialist joint lists		3,845	9.39%	0
Socialist Left Party	SV	3,201	7.81%	0
Liberal Party	V	1,260	3.08%	0
Communist Party of Norway	K	640	1.56%	0
Lapp People's List		594	1.45%	0
Progress Party	FrP	543	1.33%	0
Red Electoral Alliance	RV	357	0.87%	0
Plebiscite Party		56	0.14%	0
Freely Elected Representatives		25	0.06%	0
Valid votes		40,961	100.00%	4
Rejected votes		52	0.10%	
Total polled		41,013	75.45%	
Registered electors		54,361		

The following candidates were elected: Thor Listau (H); Oddvar J. Majala (Ap); Oddrunn Pettersen (Ap); and Per A. Utsi (Ap).

=== 1970s ===
==== 1977 ====
Results of the 1977 parliamentary election held on 11 and 12 September 1977:

Party		Votes	%	Seats
Labour Party	Ap	21,056	55.03%	3
Conservative Party	H	6,788	17.74%	1
Christian Democratic Party, Liberal Party and New People's Party	KrF-V-DNF	5,587	14.60%	0
Socialist Left Party	SV	2,748	7.18%	0
Communist Party of Norway	K	783	2.05%	0
Lapp People's List		499	1.30%	0
Progress Party	FrP	362	0.95%	0
Red Electoral Alliance	RV	296	0.77%	0
Norwegian Democratic Party		52	0.14%	0
Free Elected Representatives		47	0.12%	0
Single Person's Party		45	0.12%	0
Valid votes		38,263	100.00%	4
Rejected votes		70	0.14%	
Total polled		38,333	76.11%	
Registered electors		50,364		

The following candidates were elected: Valter Gabrielsen (Ap); Thor Listau (H); Oddrunn Pettersen (Ap); and Per A. Utsi (Ap).

==== 1973 ====
Results of the 1973 parliamentary election held on 9 and 10 September 1973:

Party		Votes	%	Seats
Labour Party	Ap	15,639	43.93%	2
Socialist Electoral League	SV	6,807	19.12%	1
Conservative Party	H	4,612	12.95%	1
Liberal Party and Centre Party	V-Sp	3,465	6.82%	0
Christian Democratic Party	KrF	2,397	6.73%	0
Anders Lange's Party	ALP	1,205	3.38%	0
Lapp People's List		849	2.38%	0
New People's Party	DNF	318	0.89%	0
Red Electoral Alliance	RV	173	0.49%	0
Single Person's Party		51	0.14%	0
Norwegian Democratic Party		48	0.13%	0
Women's Free Elected Representatives		37	0.10%	0
Valid votes		35,601	100.00%	4
Rejected votes		62	0.13%	
Total polled		35,663	73.14%	
Registered electors		48,761		

The following candidates were elected: Valter Gabrielsen (Ap); Tor Henriksen (SV); Thor Listau (H); and Annemarie Lorentzen (Ap).

=== 1960s ===
==== 1969 ====
Results of the 1969 parliamentary election held on 7 and 8 September 1969:

Party		Votes	%	Seats
Labour Party	Ap	22,315	61.34%	3
Conservative Party	H	6,392	17.57%	1
Socialist People's Party	SF	2,116	5.82%	0
Communist Party of Norway	K	1,474	4.05%	0
Liberal Party	V	1,380	3.79%	0
Christian Democratic Party	KrF	1,246	3.42%	0
Centre Party	Sp	932	2.56%	0
Lapp People's List		527	1.45%	0
Valid votes		36,382	100.00%	4
Rejected votes		84	0.18%	
Total polled		36,466	78.94%	
Registered electors		46,197		

The following candidates were elected: Anders John Aune (Ap); Valter Gabrielsen (Ap); Annemarie Lorentzen (Ap); and Erling Norvik (H).

==== 1965 ====
Results of the 1965 parliamentary election held on 12 and 13 September 1965:

Party		Votes	%	Seats
Labour Party	Ap	18,881	55.64%	3
Conservative Party	H	7,219	21.27%	1
Communist Party of Norway	K	2,424	7.14%	0
Socialist People's Party	SF	2,214	6.52%	0
Liberal Party	V	1,769	5.21%	0
Christian Democratic Party	KrF	1,433	4.22%	0
Wild Votes		1	0.00%	0
Valid votes		33,941	100.00%	4
Rejected votes		267	0.62%	
Total polled		34,208	79.08%	
Registered electors		43,260		

The following candidates were elected: Valter Gabrielsen (Ap); Harry Johan Olai Klippenvåg (Ap); Erling Norvik (H); and Harald Nicolai Samuelsberg (Ap).

==== 1961 ====
Results of the 1961 parliamentary election held on 11 September 1961:

Party		Votes	%	Seats
Labour Party	Ap	18,990	62.02%	3
Conservative Party	H	5,762	18.82%	1
Communist Party of Norway	K	3,704	12.10%	0
Liberal Party	V	2,133	6.97%	0
Wild Votes		27	0.09%	0
Valid votes		30,616	100.00%	4
Rejected votes		338	0.81%	
Total polled		30,955	74.36%	
Registered electors		41,631		

The following candidates were elected: Harry Johan Olai Klippenvåg (Ap); Erling Norvik (H); Johannes Olai Olsen (Ap); and Harald Nicolai Samuelsberg (Ap).

=== 1950s ===
==== 1957 ====
Results of the 1957 parliamentary election held on 7 October 1957:

Party		Votes	%	Seats
Labour Party	Ap	18,117	61.62%	3
Conservative Party and Liberal Party	H-V	5,884	15.46%	1
Communist Party of Norway	K	3,804	12.94%	0
Christian Democratic Party	KrF	1,595	5.43%	0
Valid votes		29,400	100.00%	4
Rejected votes		304	0.75%	
Total polled		29,704	73.68%	
Registered electors		40,313		

The following candidates were elected: Harry Johan Olai Klippenvåg (Ap); Erling Norvik (H); Johannes Olai Olsen (Ap); and Harald Nicolai Samuelsberg (Ap).

==== 1953 ====
Results of the 1953 parliamentary election held on 12 October 1953:

Party		Votes	%	Seats
Labour Party	Ap	15,516	54.66%	2
Communist Party of Norway	K	5,120	18.04%	1
Conservative Party	H	4,638	16.34%	1
Christian Democratic Party	KrF	1,640	5.78%	0
Liberal Party	V	1,471	5.18%	0
Valid votes		28,385	100.00%	4
Rejected votes		107	0.28%	
Total polled		28,659	73.67%	
Registered electors		38,902		

The following candidates were elected: Gotfred Johan Hølvold (K); Harry Johan Olai Klippenvåg (Ap); Erling Norvik (H); and Johannes Olai Olsen (Ap).

=== 1940s ===
==== 1949 ====
Results of the 1949 parliamentary election held on 10 October 1949:

Party		Votes	%	Seats
Labour Party	Ap	12,583	60.82%	3
Communist Party of Norway	K	3,469	16.77%	0
Conservative Party	H	2,789	13.48%	0
Liberal Party	V	1,848	8.93%	0
Valid votes		20,689	100.00%	3
Rejected votes		267	0.87%	
Total polled		20,956	67.93%	
Registered electors		30,851		

The following candidates were elected: Cornelius Karlstrøm (Ap); Harry Johan Olai Klippenvåg (Ap); and Johannes Olai Olsen (Ap).

==== 1945 ====
Results of the 1945 parliamentary election held on 8 October 1945:

Party		Votes	%	Seats
Labour Party	Ap	6,021	60.48%	2
Communist Party of Norway	K	2,271	21.46%	1
Conservative Party	H	930	10.89%	0
Liberal Party	V	682	7.17%	0
Wild Votes		1	0.01%	0
Valid votes		9,905	100.00%	3
Rejected votes		565	2.25%	
Total polled		10,470	41.63%	
Registered electors		25,149		

The following candidates were elected: Johannes Olai Olsen (Ap); Alfred Leonard Kristian Vågnes (K); and Terje Wold (Ap).

=== 1930s ===
==== 1936 ====
Results of the 1936 parliamentary election held on 19 October 1936:

Party		Party			List Alliance		
Party		Votes	%	Seats	Votes	%	Seats
Labour Party	Ap	11,235	58.69%	2	11,235	58.83%	2
Free-minded People's Party and Conservative Party	H-FF	3,767	19.68%	1	7,091	37.13%	1
Liberal Party	V	3,370	17.65%	0	7,091	37.13%	1
Society Party	Samfp	500	2.61%	0	500	2.62%	0
Nasjonal Samling	NS	269	1.41%	0	269	0.76%	0
Wild Votes		2	0.01%	0	2	0.01%	0
Valid votes		19,143	100.00%	3	19,097	100.00%	3
Rejected votes		92	0.38%				
Total polled		19,235	79.43%				
Registered electors		24,216					

As the list alliance was not entitled to more seats contesting as an alliance than it was contesting as individual parties, the distribution of seats was as party votes.

The following candidates were elected: Kristian Herman Berg (Ap); Aksel Konrad Mikkola (Ap); and Carl R. Olsen (H-FF).

==== 1933 ====
Results of the 1933 parliamentary election held on 16 October 1933:

Party		Votes	%	Seats
Labour Party	Ap	8,020	48.80%	2
Free-minded People's Party and Conservative Party	H-FF	4,026	24.52%	1
Liberal Party	V	2,965	18.06%	0
Communist Party of Norway	K	1,408	8.57%	0
Wild Votes		1	0.01%	0
Valid votes		16,420	100.00%	3
Rejected votes		134	0.61%	
Total polled		16,554	74.87%	
Registered electors		22,109		

The following candidates were elected: Kristian Herman Berg (Ap); Aksel Konrad Mikkola (Ap); and Carl R. Olsen (H-FF).

==== 1930 ====
Results of the 1930 parliamentary election held on 20 October 1930:

Party		Party			List Alliance		
Party		Votes	%	Seats	Votes	%	Seats
Labour Party	Ap	5,126	36.21%	1	5,126	36.35%	1
Conservative Party and Free-minded Liberal Party	H-FV	5,061	35.75%	1	8,382	59.44%	2
Liberal Party	V	3,377	23.85%	1	8,382	59.44%	2
Communist Party of Norway	K	593	4.19%	0	593	4.21%	0
Wild Votes		1	0.01%	0	1	0.01%	0
Valid votes		14,158	100.00%	3	14,102	100.00%	3
Rejected votes		96	0.46%				
Total polled		14,254	68.33%				
Registered electors		20,862					

As the list alliance was not entitled to more seats contesting as an alliance than it was contesting as individual parties, the distribution of seats was as party votes.

The following candidates were elected: Kristian Herman Berg (Ap); Johan Martin Mjøen (V); and Carl R. Olsen (H-FV).

=== 1920s ===
==== 1927 ====
Results of the 1927 parliamentary election held on 17 October 1927:

Party		Votes	%	Seats
Labour Party	Ap	5,629	51.09%	2
Liberal Party	V	2,048	18.59%	1
Conservative Party and Free-minded Liberal Party	H-FV	2,033	18.45%	0
Communist Party of Norway	K	1,307	11.86%	0
Wild Votes		1	0.01%	0
Valid votes		11,018	100.00%	3
Rejected votes		315	1.64%	
Total polled		11,333	59.11%	
Registered electors		19,174		

The following candidates were elected: Kristian Herman Berg (Ap); Johan Martin Mjøen (V); and Ole Konrad Steinholt (Ap).

==== 1924 ====
Results of the 1924 parliamentary election held on 21 October 1924:

Party		Votes	%	Seats
Conservative Party and Free-minded Liberal Party	H-FV	2,876	29.76%	1
Labour Party	Ap	2,055	21.26%	1
Liberal Party	V	1,814	18.77%	1
Social Democratic Labour Party of Norway	S	1,633	16.90%	0
Communist Party of Norway	K	1,284	13.29%	0
Wild Votes		2	0.02%	0
Valid votes		9,664	100.00%	3
Rejected votes		405	1.27%	
Total polled		10,069	56.39%	
Registered electors		17,857		

The following candidates were elected: Waldemar Heggelund Larssen (H-FV); Johan Martin Mjøen (V); and Christian Ludvik Wallenius (Ap).

==== 1921 ====
Results of the 1921 parliamentary election held on 24 October 1921:

Party		Votes	%	Seats
Liberal Party	V	3,081	33.39%	1
Conservative Party and Free-minded Liberal Party	H-FV	2,560	27.74%	1
Labour Party	Ap	2,261	24.50%	1
Social Democratic Labour Party of Norway	S	876	9.49%	0
Samerne		411	4.45%	0
Wild Votes		39	0.42%	0
Valid votes		9,228	100.00%	3
Rejected votes		669	4.12%	
Total polled		9,897	61.00%	
Registered electors		16,225		

The following candidates were elected: Thorolf Bugge (Ap); Waldemar Heggelund Larssen (H-FV); and Hagbarth Lund (V).
