= Jarle =

- Gender: Male

Origin
- Origin: Norwegian

Jarle is a masculine Norwegian given name and may refer to:

== People ==
=== Given name ===
- Jarle Aambø (born 1960), Norwegian sports official
- Jarle Aarbakke (born 1942), Norwegian pharmacologist
- Jarle Andhøy (born 1977), Norwegian sailor and explorer
- Jarle Benum (1928–2021), Norwegian politician
- Jarle Bernhoft (born 1976), Norwegian musician and singer
- Jarle Bondevik (1934–2016), Norwegian philologist
- Jarle Friis (born 1964), Norwegian ice hockey player
- Jarle Halsnes (born 1957), Norwegian alpine skier
- Jarle Høysæter (1933–2017), Norwegian journalist
- Jarle Ofstad (1927–2014), Norwegian physician
- Jarle Pedersen (born 1955), Norwegian speed skater
- Jarle Simensen (born 1937), Norwegian historian
- Jarle Steinsland (born 1980), Norwegian footballer
- Jarle Vespestad (born 1966), Norwegian jazz percussionist
- Jarle Wee (born 1972), Norwegian footballer

=== Middle name ===
- Rolf Jarle Brøske (born 1980), Norwegian politician
- Oskar Jarle Grimstad (born 1954), Norwegian politician
- Sjur Jarle Hauge (born 1971), Norwegian footballer and manager
- Bjørn Jarle Rødberg Larsen (born 1974), Norwegian politician
