= Simensen =

Simensen is a surname. Notable people with the surname include:

- Bjørn Simensen (1947–2025), Norwegian culture administrator and journalist
- Don Simensen (1926–1994), American football player
- Jarle Simensen (born 1937), Norwegian historian
- Kåre Simensen (born 1955), Norwegian politician for the Labour Party
- Karen Simensen (married name Klæboe) (1907–1996), Norwegian figure skater
- Sigurd Simensen (1888–1969), Norwegian newspaper editor and politician

== See also ==
- Simensen Peak, standing on the north side of Glitrefonna Glacier in the Sor Rondane Mountains of Antarctica
- Simonsen
