= Monica Nielsen =

Monica Nielsen may refer to:

- Monica Nielsen (actress) (1937–2025), Swedish actress
- Monica Nielsen (politician) (born 1974), Norwegian politician
