= Monica Nielsen (politician) =

Norwegian politician (born 1974)

Deputy Member of the Storting
- Incumbent
- Assumed office 1 October 2025
- Deputising for: Marianne Sivertsen Næss (2025–)
- Constituency: Finnmark

Mayor of Alta Municipality
- In office 26 October 2015 – 29 September 2025
- Deputy: Anita Hakegård Pedersen; Jan Martin Rishaug
- Preceded by: Laila Davidsen
- Succeeded by: Jan Martin Rishaug

Personal details
- Born: 20 July 1974 (age 52)
- Party: Labour Party
- Education: Finnmark University College

Monica Nielsen (born 20 July 1974) is a Norwegian politician and deputy member of the Storting. A member of the Labour Party, she has represented Finnmark since October 2025.

Nielsen was born on 20 July 1974. She grew up in Alta and studied economics and administration at Finnmark University College.

Nielsen was mayor of Alta from 2015 to 2025. She was the Labour Party's third placed candidate in Finnmark at the 2025 parliamentary election but the party won only two seats in the constituency. She became the party's first deputy representative (Vararepresentant) in the constituency. She entered the Storting on 1 October 2025 as a permanent substitute for Minister of Fisheries and Ocean Policy Marianne Sivertsen Næss.
