= Tove Bull =

Norwegian linguist

Tove Bull (born 31 October 1945) is a Norwegian linguist.

Born in Alta, Bull was appointed associate professor at the University of Tromsø in 1984, and was promoted to professor in 1990. Bull served as pro rector from 1990 to 1995, and then became the first female rector of the University of Tromsø, holding this position from 1996 to 2001.

Bull was a member of the Norwegian Language Council from 1980 to 1995, a member of the board of Finnmark University College from 2003 to 2007, and a member of the board of the Sámi University College from 2007. In November 2006, Bull was awarded the Royal Norwegian Order of St. Olav with the rank of Commander. Bull is a member of the Norwegian Academy of Science and Letters.

In 2005, a festschrift was published in honour of Bull.

Academic offices
Preceded by Ole Danbolt Mjøs	Rector of the University of Tromsø; 1996–2001	Succeeded by Jarle Aarbakke
