= Hospital to Alta =

Defunct single-issue political party in Norway

- Leader: Raymond Londal
- Headquarters: Alta
- Ideology: Single-issue
- Parliament: 0 / 169

Website
- Facebook page

Hospital to Alta (Norwegian: Sykehus til Alta) was a Norwegian political party which was active for the 2013 parliamentary election. The party's sole issue was the desire to relocate Hammerfest Hospital, the sole hospital in western Finnmark, from the town of Hammerfest to the nearby town of Alta. The party was based on a Facebook group which gradually developed into a party list for the election. Former Conservative Party local politician Raymond Londal was the top candidate, along with nine other people. The party ran exclusively in the constituency of Finnmark. The party received 467 votes, of which 370 were cast in Alta, or 1.2 percent in Finnmark and 3.9 percent in Alta, failing to claim a seat in Parliament. The party was abolished after the election.

== History ==
The party had its origins as a Facebook group which has the same name as the party. The issue of starting a party had been discussed at several meetings in relation to the group, although a majority had been opposed to starting a party. On 18 January 2013 the page's main administrator, Raymond Londal, asked for 500 people to like they post if they wanted him to start the preparation for a party, including collecting the necessary 500 signatures needed to register a party. Londal had initially given a deadline to 1 March, but it took only 75 minutes before he had sufficient likes to proceed.

Londal started early that he hoped that the list could act as a unified list for several profiled politicians, including the Progress Party's parliamentarian Jan-Henrik Fredriksen and the Liberal Party's Trine Noodt, although these never joined. Londal, himself a Conservative Party member of Alta Municipal Council, resigned his membership in the Conservatives to be top candidate for the new list. He continued to meet in the municipal council as an independent.

Prior to the election Londal stated that he hoped that the list would be able to secure a single candidate to parliament, although he admitted that this was optimistic. The party rallied at the school election at Alta Upper Secondary School, claiming 88 of 754 votes, or 12.2 percent, and making them the third-largest party. Londal stated the day after the election that the party's function now had been completed and that it would be dissolved. A week later he joined the Liberal Party.

== Issue ==
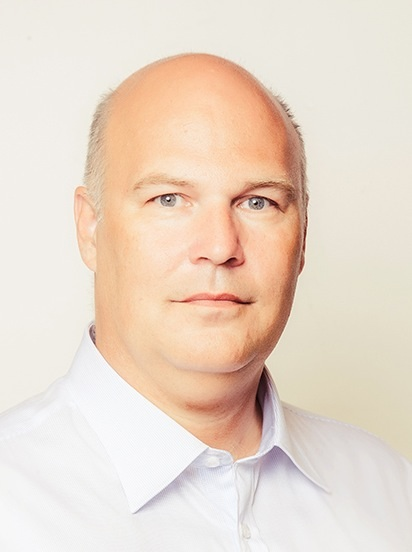
Raymond Londal, the party's top candidate

The party only had a single issue, namely that the sole hospital serving western Finnmark should be relocated from Hammerfest to Alta. The party stated that Alta is more centrally located than Hammerfest and argued that a hospital in Alta would give a closer service to the residents, lower transport costs and better quality. Hospital to Alta was opposed to a three-hospital solution for Finnmark, whereby there would be hospitals in both Alta and Hammerfest. The issue was especially relevant because there were plans to build a new hospital for the region. Londal mentioned Altagård as a potential location and proposed 2016 as the year for construction to start.

== Election ==
Hospital to Alta exclusively ran in the constituency of Finnmark, which is awarded five members of Parliament, including one leveling seat. It was one of fifteen parties to run in the county and the only to run exclusively in Finnmark. The top candidate was the fifty-year-old Raymond Londal, a teacher and municipal council member from Alta. The second candidate was the thirty-seven-year-old May Ragnhild Vasara Jørgensen from Alta and in third place the twenty-four-year-old Erika Niittyvuopio from Karasjok Municipality. The remainder of the ten candidates were all from Alta.

For Finnmark as a whole the party achieved 467 votes, or 1.2 percent, making it the tenth-largest party. The party received 370 votes in Alta, or 3.9, making it the sixth-largest party. The best result was reached in Kautokeino Municipality, where the party received 74 votes, or 5.1 percent, making it the seventh-largest party. In Hammerfest the party received one vote. In the remainder of the municipalities it received a combined 27 votes, with between zero and two per municipality.

== See also ==
- Patient Focus (Norway), a similar political party formed in 2021
