= Jan Petersen (politician) =

Norwegian politician (born 1946)

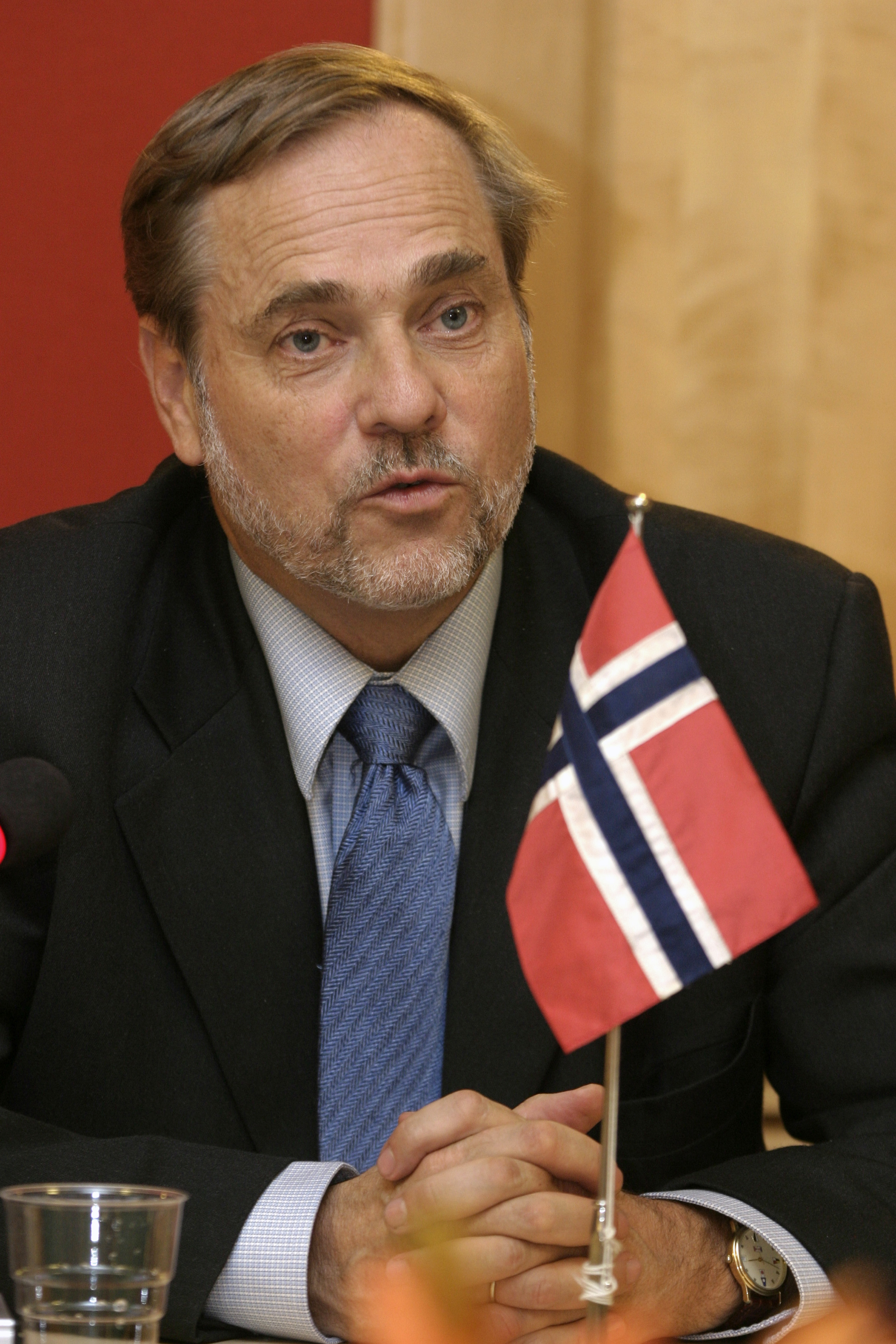
- Petersen in 2003 as Minister of Foreign Affairs.

Minister of Foreign Affairs
- In office 19 October 2001 – 17 October 2005
- Prime Minister: Kjell Magne Bondevik
- Preceded by: Thorbjørn Jagland
- Succeeded by: Jonas Gahr Støre

Conservative Parliamentary Leader
- In office 1 October 1994 – 17 October 2001
- Leader: Himself
- Preceded by: Anders Talleraas
- Succeeded by: Oddvard Nilsen

Leader of the Conservative Party
- In office 10 April 1994 – 9 May 2004
- First Deputy: Børge Brende; Inge Lønning; Erna Solberg
- Second Deputy: Elisabeth Aspaker; Anne Berit Andersen; Per-Kristian Foss
- Preceded by: Kaci Kullmann Five
- Succeeded by: Erna Solberg

Member of the Norwegian Parliament
- In office 1 October 1981 – 30 September 2009
- Constituency: Akershus

Mayor of Oppegård
- In office 1 January 1976 – 30 September 1981
- Preceded by: Tore Haugen
- Succeeded by: Bjørn Kristiansen

Leader of the Young Conservatives
- In office 1971–1973
- Preceded by: Hans Svelleland
- Succeeded by: Per-Kristian Foss

Personal details
- Born: 11 June 1946 (age 79) Oslo, Norway
- Party: Conservative
- Spouse: Vesla Johannessen (m. 1984)
- Education: University of Oslo

Jan Petersen (born 11 June 1946, in Oslo) is a Norwegian politician for the Conservative Party. Petersen was elected to the Norwegian Parliament from Akershus in 1981, and was re-elected on six occasions. He had previously served as a deputy representative during the term 1973–1977. From 2001 to 2005, Petersen was Minister of Foreign Affairs in Bondevik's Second Cabinet. During this period his seat in parliament was held by André Oktay Dahl.

On the local level Petersen was a member of Oppegård municipal council from 1967 to 1983, serving as mayor from 1975 to 1981.

He chaired the Conservative Party from 1994 to 2004. From 1971 to 1973 he was the leader of the Young Conservatives (Unge Høyre), the youth wing of the Conservative Party.

Outside politics Petersen has a cand.jur. degree from the University of Oslo in 1973. Before entering national politics he worked for a few years in the Norwegian Agency for Development Cooperation (Norad). From 2009 to 2014 he served as Norway's ambassador to Austria and Permanent Representative to the United Nations in Vienna. He retired in 2014.

In 2004, Petersen was appointed a Commander with Star of the Order of St. Olav.

Political offices
Preceded by Thorbjørn Jagland	Minister of Foreign Affairs; 2001–2005	Succeeded by Jonas Gahr Støre
Party political offices
Preceded by Hans Svelland	Leader of the Norwegian Young Conservatives; 1971–1973	Succeeded by Per-Kristian Foss
Preceded by Kaci Kullmann Five	Leader of the Conservative Party; 1994–2004	Succeeded by Erna Solberg
