= Anne Berit Andersen =

Norwegian politician (born 1951)

Member of the Norwegian Parliament
- In office 1 October 2001 – 30 September 2005
- Constituency: Vest-Agder

Second Deputy Leader of the Conservative Party
- In office 29 March 1998 – 5 May 2002
- Leader: Jan Petersen
- Preceded by: Elisabeth Aspaker
- Succeeded by: Per-Kristian Foss

Mayor of Søgne Municipality
- In office 1 January 1992 – 18 September 2001
- Preceded by: Bjorne Nesheim
- Succeeded by: Eli Løite

Personal details
- Born: 2 December 1951 (age 74) Søgne Municipality, Norway
- Party: Conservative Party

Anne Berit Andersen (born 2 December 1951) is a Norwegian politician for the Conservative Party.

Andersen was elected to the Norwegian Parliament from Vest-Agder in 2001, but was not re-elected in 2005. She served in the position of deputy representative during the terms 1997–2001 and 2005–2009. Andersen was mayor of Søgne Municipality from 1991 to 2001.
