= Per-Kristian Foss =

Norwegian politician (born 1950)

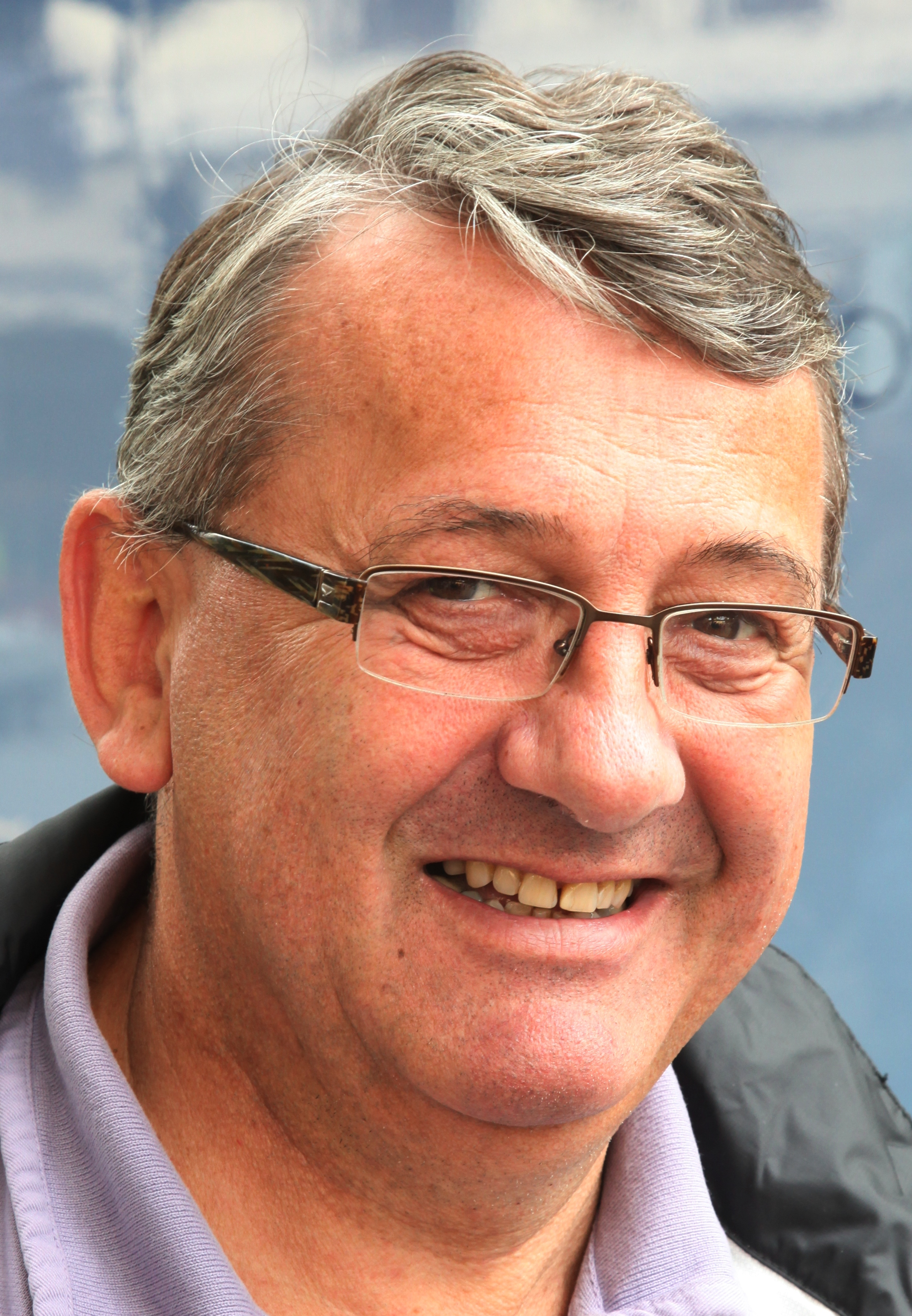
- Foss in 2009

Second Vice President of the Storting
- In office 8 October 2009 – 30 September 2013
- President: Dag Terje Andersen
- Preceded by: Position established
- Succeeded by: Kenneth Svendsen

First Deputy Leader of the Conservative Party
- In office 9 May 2004 – 27 April 2008
- Leader: Erna Solberg
- Preceded by: Erna Solberg
- Succeeded by: Jan Tore Sanner

Second Deputy Leader of the Conservative Party
- In office 5 May 2002 – 9 May 2004
- Leader: Jan Petersen
- Preceded by: Anne Berit Andersen
- Succeeded by: Jan Tore Sanner

Minister of Finance
- In office 19 October 2001 – 17 October 2005
- Prime Minister: Kjell Magne Bondevik
- Preceded by: Karl Eirik Schjøtt-Pedersen
- Succeeded by: Kristin Halvorsen

Member of the Norwegian Parliament
- In office 1 October 1981 – 30 September 2013
- Deputy: Ine Eriksen Søreide
- Constituency: Oslo

Leader of the Young Conservatives
- In office 1 June 1973 – 1 June 1977
- Preceded by: Jan Petersen
- Succeeded by: Kaci Kullmann Five

Personal details
- Born: Per-Kristian Foss; 19 July 1950 (age 75) Oslo, Norway
- Party: Conservative
- Spouse: Jan Erik Knarbakk
- Occupation: Politician

Per-Kristian Foss (born 19 July 1950) is a Norwegian politician for the Conservative Party and from 2014 to 2021 the Auditor General of Norway.

He was elected to the Norwegian Parliament from Oslo in 1981, and was re-elected on six occasions. He had previously served as a deputy representative during the term 1977–1981.

From 2001 to 2005, when the second cabinet Bondevik held office, Foss was Minister of Finance. He also acted as Prime Minister very briefly in 2002. During this period his seat in parliament was taken by Ine Eriksen Søreide. Foss has received much attention for being the first openly gay minister in a Norwegian government and lives in registered partnership with Jan Erik Knarbakk. He was the first openly homosexual national leader.

On the local level Foss was a deputy member of Oslo city council from 1971 to 1975.

From 1973 to 1977 he was the leader of the Young Conservatives (Unge Høyre), the youth wing of the Conservative Party. Per Kristian Foss was mentioned as a possible new leader for the Conservative Party after Jan Petersen resigned in 2004, but he declined to run and instead supported Erna Solberg. After Høyre struggled in elections and polls during the first years of Erna Solberg's leadership he was also mentioned as a possible new leader, but he never challenged Solberg for the leadership position. At present Foss is deputy chairman of the Conservative Party and member of the party's central board.

Foss has a cand.mag. degree in political science, public law and criminology from the University of Oslo (1977) and partial graduate studies in political science.

Political offices
Preceded by Karl Eirik Schjøtt-Pedersen	Norwegian Minister of Finance; 2001–2005	Succeeded by Kristin Halvorsen
Party political offices
Preceded by Jan Petersen	Leader of Norwegian Young Conservatives; 1973–1977	Succeeded by Kaci Kullmann Five
