= Alf E. Jakobsen =

Norwegian politician (born 1952)

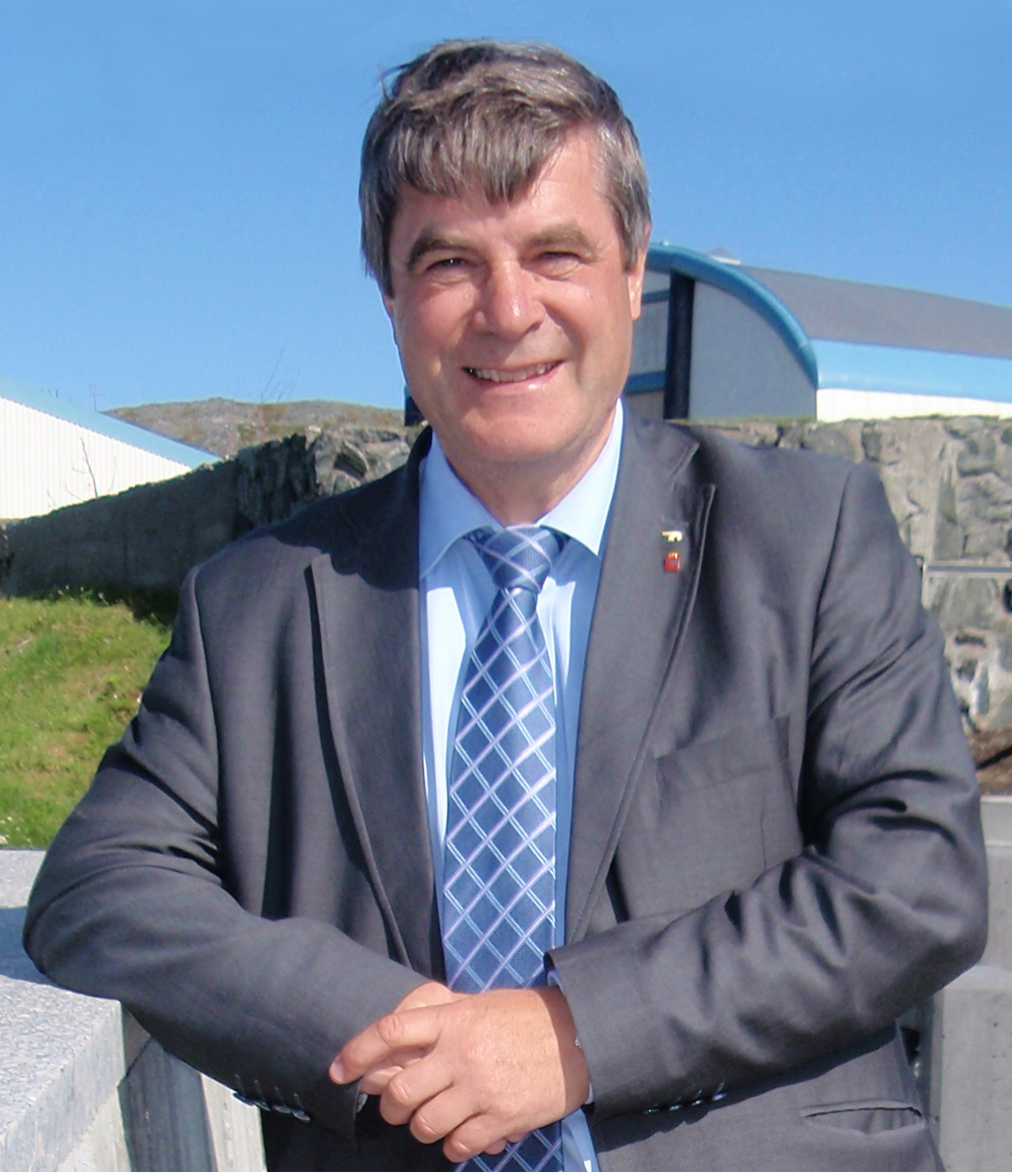
- Jakobsen in 2009

Deputy Member of the Storting
- In office 1 October 2001 – 30 September 2009
- Deputising for: Karl Eirik Schjøtt-Pedersen (2001 and 2006–2009)
- Constituency: Finnmark
- In office 1 October 1989 – 30 September 1993
- Deputising for: Oddrunn Pettersen (1990–1992)
- Constituency: Finnmark

Mayor of Hammerfest Municipality
- In office 1 October 2009 – 10 October 2019
- Deputy: Kristine Jørstad Bock; Marianne Sivertsen Næss
- Preceded by: Kristine Jørstad Bock
- Succeeded by: Marianne Sivertsen Næss
- In office October 1999 – 1 December 2006
- Deputy: Kristine Jørstad Bock
- Preceded by: Tormod Bartholdsen
- Succeeded by: Kristine Jørstad Bock

Personal details
- Born: 11 January 1952 (age 74) Lenvik, Troms
- Party: Labour

Alf Einar Jakobsen (born 11 January 1952 in Lenvik Municipality) is a former Norwegian politician for the Labour Party.

== Career ==
Jakobsen served as a deputy representative to the Storting from Finnmark from 1989 to 1993 and from 2001 to 2009. During the first two terms he met as a regular representative for a period meanwhile Oddrunn Pettersen and Karl Eirik Schjøtt-Pedersen respectively were appointed to the Cabinet. In December 2006 Karl Eirik Schjøtt-Pedersen was appointed to work at the Prime Minister's office, and Jakobsen became a regular representative for the third time.

Jakobsen held various positions on the municipal council of Hammerfest Municipality from 1975 to 1987, and then served as mayor there from 1999 to 2006. After ending his term in parliament in 2009 Jakobsen once again became mayor in Hammerfest Municipality. The Labour Party retained their majority in Hammerfest in the 2011 elections, and Jacobsen continued as mayor. He was also re-elected in the 2015 local elections. He didn't seek re-election at the 2019 local elections and was succeeded by his deputy, Marianne Sivertsen Næss.
