= Jarle Aarbakke =

Norwegian pharmacologist and rector

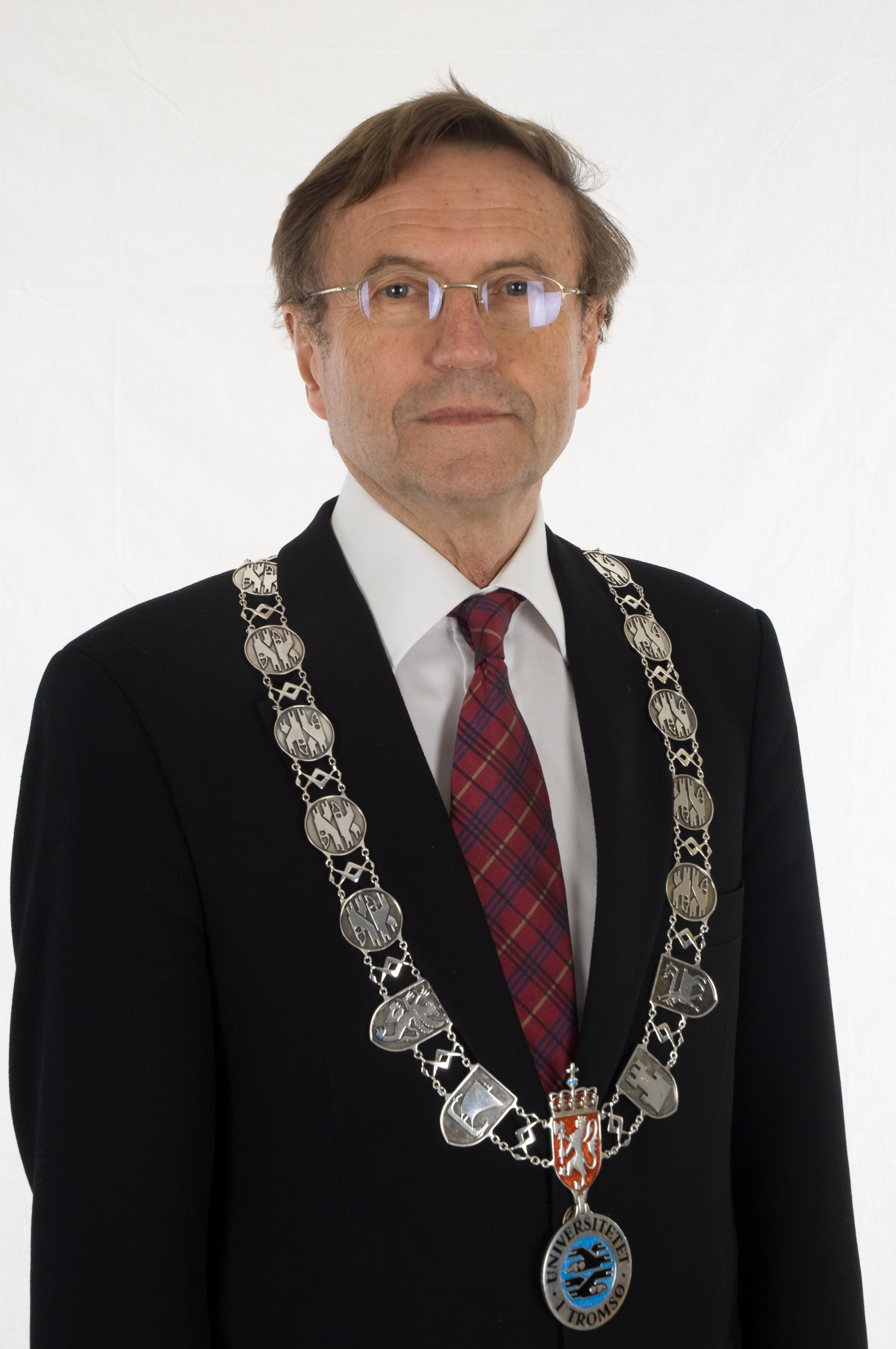
- Born: 18 November 1942 (age 83)
- Occupation: Mayor of Tromsø

Jarle Aarbakke (born 18 November 1942) is a Norwegian pharmacologist, rector and politician for the Labour Party

He took the dr.med. degreee at the University of Tromsø in 1978, and served as a professor of pharmacology at the same institution from 1982. He then served as rector at the University of Tromsø from 2002 to 2013. During his time as rector, the University of Tromsø absorbed Tromsø University College in 2009 and Finnmark University College in 2013, adopting the moninker "Arctic University of Norway".

From 1997 to 1998, he chaired a committee to assess laws on alternative and supplementary medicine, delivering the Norwegian Official Report 1998: 21. Alternativ medisin. From 2007 to 2009 he chaired the board of the Norwegian Association of Higher Education Institutions (UHR), having been deputy chair from 2005. He was deputy chair of the Research Council of Norway from 2011 to 2014. In 2013, he was decorated as a Knight, First Class of the Order of St. Olav.

In the 2015 Norwegian local elections, Aarbakke was elected deputy mayor of Tromsø. He was acting mayor from October 2015 to July 2016.

Academic offices
| Preceded by Tove Bull | Rector of the University of Tromsø; 2001–2013 | Succeeded by Anne Husebekk |
