= Siren Julianne Jensen =

Norwegian politician (born 1983)

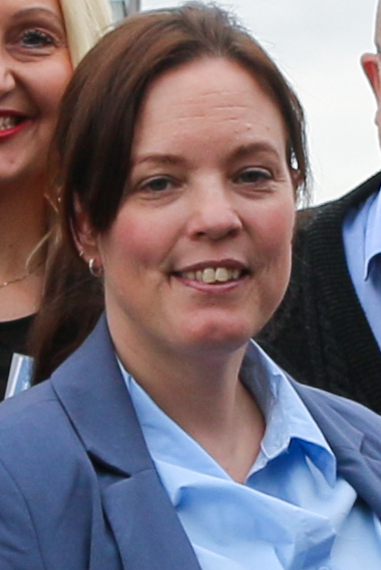

Member of the Storting
- Incumbent
- Assumed office 1 October 2025
- Constituency: Finnmark

Personal details
- Born: 4 September 1983 (age 42)
- Party: Green Party

Siren Julianne Jensen (born 4 September 1983) is a Norwegian politician who was elected member of the Storting in 2025. She is a co-spokesperson of the Green Party in Troms og Finnmark.
