= Bengt Rune Strifeldt =

Norwegian politician

Member of the Storting
- Incumbent
- Assumed office 1 October 2017
- Constituency: Finnmark

Personal details
- Born: 24 March 1971 (age 55)
- Occupation: Politician

Bengt Rune Strifeldt (born 24 March 1971) is a Norwegian politician. He was elected representative to the Storting for the period 2017–2021 for the Progress Party and was re-elected in 2021 and 2025.
