= Marianne Sivertsen Næss =

Norwegian politician

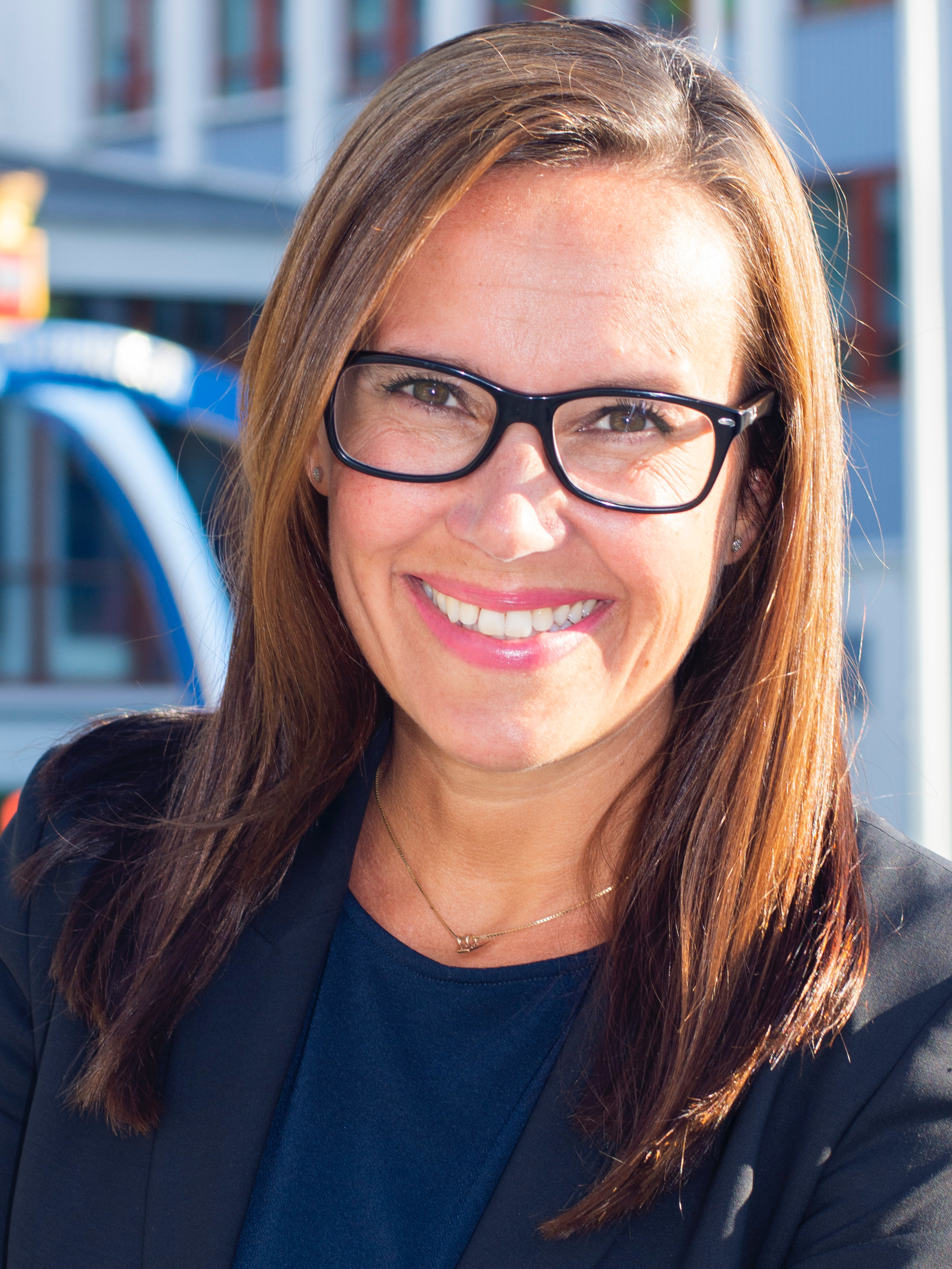
- Næss in June 2019

Minister of Fisheries and Ocean Policy
- Incumbent
- Assumed office 19 April 2024
- Prime Minister: Jonas Gahr Støre
- Preceded by: Cecilie Myrseth

Member of the Storting
- Incumbent
- Assumed office 1 October 2021
- Deputy: Sigurd Kvammen Rafaelsen; Monica Nielsen
- Constituency: Finnmark

Mayor of Hammerfest Municipality
- In office 10 October 2019 – 28 October 2021
- Deputy: Terje Wikstrøm
- Preceded by: Alf E. Jakobsen
- Succeeded by: Terje Wikstrøm

Deputy Mayor of Hammerfest Municipality
- In office 10 October 2011 – 10 October 2019
- Mayor: Alf E. Jakobsen
- Preceded by: Kristine Jørstad Bock
- Succeeded by: Terje Wikstrøm

Personal details
- Born: 28 March 1974 (age 52) Hammerfest, Finnmark, Norway
- Party: Labour
- Children: 4 (1 deceased)
- Occupation: School principal Politician

Marianne Sivertsen Næss (born 28 March 1974) is a Norwegian school principal and politician for the Labour Party. She is currently minister of fisheries and ocean policy since 2024 and a member of parliament for Finnmark since 2021. She previously served as mayor of Hammerfest Municipality between 2019 and 2021, and deputy mayor between 2011 and 2019.

== Political career ==
=== Local politics ===
On the local level, she has been a member of the Municipal Council of Hammerfest Municipality since 2007 and served as deputy mayor of Hammerfest between 2011 and 2019, with Alf E. Jakobsen as mayor. She succeeded him as mayor in 2019 after he didn't seek re-election, with Terje Wikstrøm as deputy. She gained national attention for her handling of the COVID-19 pandemic in Hammerfest, which was strongly affected by the outbreak.

She resigned in 2021 in order to take her seat in parliament, and was succeeded by Wikstrøm. He would go on to lose the 2023 local elections to the Conservative Party's Terje Rogde.

=== Parliament ===
She was elected as a representative to the Storting from the constituency of Finnmark for the period 2021–2025. She was re-elected in 2025. In parliament, she was a member of the Standing Committee on Energy and the Environment, to which she was elected chair of in 2022. She left the position upon her 2024 ministerial appointment, and was succeeded by Ingvild Kjerkol. While serving in government from 2024, Sigurd Kvammen Rafaelsen deputised in her place from 2024 to 2025. From 2025, Monica Nielsen has deputised in her place.

=== Minister of Fisheries ===
Næss was appointed minister of fisheries and ocean policy on 19 April 2024 following the dismissal of Ingvild Kjerkol in the wake of a plagiarism scandal.

==== 2024 ====
In June, Norway signed a deal on mackerel fishing with the United Kingdom and the Faroe Islands, which would ensure management, distribution and access to fishing for mackerel in each other's waters. The deal is scheduled to last at least three years. Næss hailed the deal, noting that it would ensue "flexibility and predictability" in Norwegian vessels' fishing and that it was important for production planning in the agricultural industry.

Næss expressed concerns for illegal fishing tourism in July following revelations by NRK of the matter in Western Finnmark. As a result she put down a commission which will look into the matter and the report will be presented by the Norwegian Directorate of Fisheries on how fishing tourism can be regulated and controlled better. She also proposed measures such as fishing license for foreign fishing tourists, ban on filleting and freezing fish for tourists who are not registered at a tourist fishery, and inspections of the level of the export quota.

Conservative representative Erlend Svardal Bøe submitted a question to Næss in September regarding the harbour routines after a cargo ship that was docked in Tromsø carrying dangerous explosive materials onboard. Næss responded that she would be tasking the Norwegian Coastal Administration and its subordinate agencies to investigate the matter and the routines to make necessary adjustments for interaction.

Following negotiations that lasted between 21 and 31 October, the government announced that they had reached a new fishing agreement with Russia for 2025. Næss expressed gratitude for an agreement being reached, but noting that the circumstances weren't ideal. She also hailed the agreement to be long-term and would be sustainable for marine management in the northern regions. The agreement also notably saw a decrease of 25% in quotas for cod, ensuring it to be the lowest since 1991.

==== 2025 ====
On behalf of the government, she signed a new corporation deal in March with different companies in the fisheries industry that would seek to strengthen equality and would notably focus on improved recruitment, safer work environment and a more inclusive workplace. The deal is also a follow up to the government's equality strategy for the sector from 2023.

Together with her French counterpart, Agnès Pannier-Runacher, Næss signed a new convention establishing a new centre for oceans while attending the 2025 United Nations Ocean Conference in Nice in June. She hailed the importance of sustainable development when it came to ocean and marine industry and the need for more research about oceans generally.

As a part of the revelations about the government's 2026 budget misleading and contradictions, Næss defended their decision to scrap the plans for the Stad Ship Tunnel, which was made several months before the budget was put forward. She argued that the plans for the tunnel should be viewed through "a bigger picture" as a budget case, which was why, according to her, why the government didn't reveal the plans to scrap the project before the budget was put forward. The Norwegian Coastal Administration had also been instructed to halt the bidding process for the construction of the tunnel, supposedly because they had estimated that the tunnel couldn't be constructed within the allocated costs.

In December, the government reached a fishery agreement for 2026 with both Russia and the European Union. Bilateral agreements were also signed with the former regarding fishing in the North Sea and Skagerrak. Næss emphasised the importance of securing a renewed deal with both actors and confirmed that negotiations with Russia had been challenging given the context of Norway having banned two Russian shipping companies on the suspicion of espionage.

==== 2026 ====
In March 2026, the Standing Committee on Scrutiny and Constitutional Affairs announced that they would be opening a case against Næss after NRK revealed that she on the behalf of the government, had given away quotas on opilio crabs worth 150–200 million NOK. The objective with the quotas was to give trawler owners who had put down money and effort in retrieving opilio crabs. Around thirty trawlers were given the quotas in question. Næss defended the action when questioned by the committee and later NRK.

In August, she criticised the Trump administration's increased tariffs on the grounds of not preventing imported products made through forced labour. She called the administration's findings "unreasonable" and highlighted that it put Norwegian companies in a difficult position in regards to adjustment to the changes.

Næss stated in October that county leadership and shipping companies were responsible for the operations of ferries in local communities of Northern Norway, citing the importance of this being upheld by them while facing an increased amount of cancelled voyages in her native Finnmark county. She furthermore argued that it would be out of the question to do anything about rest period or safety regulations in order to increase the amount of departing ferries, also adding that newer technology and increased training would make the job easier in the future.

== Civic career ==
Næss has an education in school management, project management and has a master's degree in special pedagogy and adapted education. She has been section leader at the Finnmark Hospital Trust and principal at Hammerfest upper secondary school. She has been on leave from her duties as principal since 2016 in order to focus on political work.

== Personal life ==
Næss is married to her husband Reidar, with whom she has three daughters. Her eldest daughter died at an early age of childhood cancer.

Political offices
Preceded by Cecilie Myrseth	Minister of Fisheries and Ocean Policy; 2024–present	Incumbent
Preceded by Terje Aasland	Chair of the Standing Committee on Energy and the Environment; 2022–2024	Succeeded by Ingvild Kjerkol
Preceded by Alf E. Jakobsen	Mayor of Hammerfest Municipality; 2019–2021	Succeeded by Terje Wikstrøm
Preceded by Kristine Jørstad Bock	Deputy Mayor of Hammerfest Municipality; 2011–2019	Succeeded by Terje Wikstrøm
