= Karl Eirik Schjøtt-Pedersen =

Norwegian politician

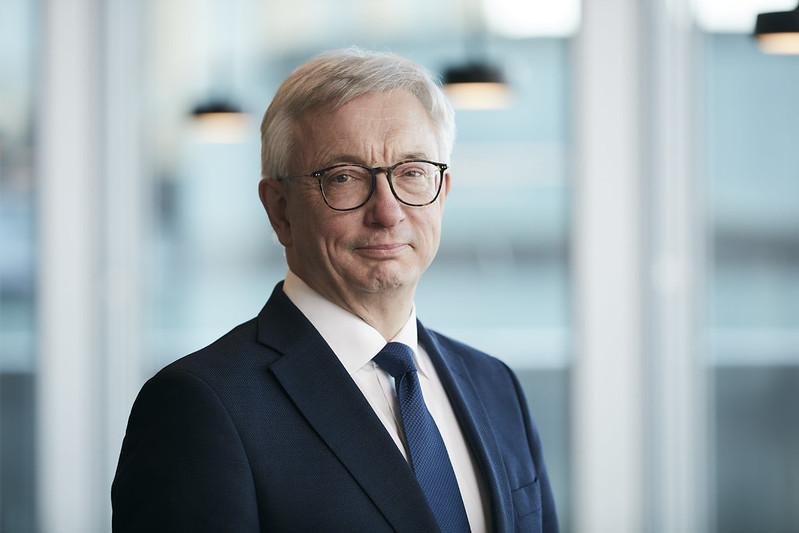

Auditor General of Norway
- Incumbent
- Assumed office 1 January 2022
- Preceded by: Per-Kristian Foss

Minister at the Office of the Prime Minister
- In office 20 October 2009 – 16 October 2013
- Prime Minister: Jens Stoltenberg
- Preceded by: Position established
- Succeeded by: Vidar Helgesen

Chief of Staff at the Office of the Prime Minister
- In office 1 December 2006 – 20 October 2009
- Prime Minister: Jens Stoltenberg

Minister of Finance
- In office 17 March 2000 – 19 October 2001
- Prime Minister: Jens Stoltenberg
- Preceded by: Gudmund Restad
- Succeeded by: Per-Kristian Foss

Minister of Fisheries
- In office 25 October 1996 – 17 October 1997
- Prime Minister: Thorbjørn Jagland
- Preceded by: Jan Henry T. Olsen
- Succeeded by: Peter Angelsen

Member of the Norwegian Parliament
- In office 1 October 1985 – 30 September 2009
- Deputy: Gunnar Mathisen; Einar Johansen; Alf E. Jakobsen
- Constituency: Finnmark

Personal details
- Born: 3 October 1959 (age 66) Vardø, Finnmark, Norway
- Party: Labour
- Spouse: Grete Lorck
- Children: 3

Karl Eirik Schjøtt-Pedersen (born 3 October 1959 in Vardø) is a Norwegian politician for the Labour Party. He is currently the Auditor General of Norway since 2022. He was a parliamentary representative for Finnmark from 1985 to 2009. He served as Minister of Fisheries from 1996 to 1997 and Minister of Finance from 2000 to 2001 in the first cabinet Stoltenberg. Pedersen was Chief of Staff at the Office of the Prime Minister and a member of the Cabinet from 2006 to 2013. From 2015 to 2020 he was the CEO at Norwegian Oil and Gas.

== Family and education ==
Schjøtt-Pedersen was born in Vardø in Finnmark in 1959, as the son of duty manager Odd Eirik Schjøtt Pedersen (1925–1993) and tax assessment secretary Aslaug Berntine Nilssen (1923–1981). He has a degree from a two-year course with a trade course from 1977, as well as a degree in art from 1978. He has a master's degree with political science, social economics and public law from the University of Oslo from 1985 and Master of Business Administration from Copenhagen Business School from 2015.

== Career ==
=== Parliament ===
Schjøtt-Pedersen was a deputy member from 1981 to 1985, when he was elected a full time member. He was re-elected in 1989, and was so until 2009. While he was minister and part of government from 1996 to 1997, 2000 to 2001 and 2006 to 2013, his seat in Parliament was covered by deputies Gunnar Mathisen (1996–1997), Einar Johansen (2000–2001) and Alf E. Jakobsen (2006–2013).

=== Post politics ===
In March 2015, he became chairman of the board of Sparebank 1 Nord-Norge.

Two months later, in May 2015, he became the CEO of Norwegian Oil and Gas. He stepped down from the position in early January 2020, but remained in place until a successor was appointed. He stated that "everything has an end", and added that he thought it was time for someone new to take over. He was subsequently succeeded by Anniken Hauglie.

In February 2020, he became a partner in the socio-economic analysis company Menon Economics.

=== Auditor General of Norway ===
In November 2021, he was nominated as the next Auditor General of Norway, succeeding retiring Per-Kristian Foss. He assumed office on 1 January 2022.

Upon assuming office, Schjøtt-Pedersen took over the investigation into members of Parliament's economic schemes. He called it "an important mission" and called the trust in elected officials "determining for the whole democratic system". He went on to say: "It is unusual for a Office of the Auditor General to generally be commissioned to review matters of such significance to the elected representatives. It is also unusual for the Storting to impose such a review. The Office of the Auditor General does not usually go into individual cases, but we will do so now".

In October, he presented a report into the Norwegian Army's information systems which determined that there were numerous vulnerabilities. Schjøtt-Pedersen also stated that the findings pinpoints serious concerns and consequences for national security.

In December, he presented a report looking into the authorities control over waste which is exported from Norway. The report concludes that Norwegian authorities' handling of the issue is critic worthy, parts of the exporting is illegal and that control over waste is lacking.

In April 2023, he presented another report into MPs economic schemes. The report determined that 61 MPs had not complied with the disclosure obligation - i.e. the rule that they must inform about other income while they are paid from the Storting so that this can be deducted. This also implies that they received to much severance pay.

In November 2025, the Office of the Auditor General of Norway had concluded that the Norwegian Labour and Welfare Administration had misinformed the Ministry of Labour and Social Inclusion and the Auditor General about a backlog of logs regarding IT systems dating back to March 2025. These had not been logged as originally reported, a discrepancy only reported in September the same year. This was also in violation of internal regulations about internal checks. The investigation also resulted in the firing of the director of Labour and Welfare Administration, Hans Christian Holte, on 11 November.

== Personal life ==
He is married to Grete Lorck, whom he met in Oslo in 1986. Together they have three children.
