= Geir Adelsten Iversen =

Norwegian politician (born 1954)

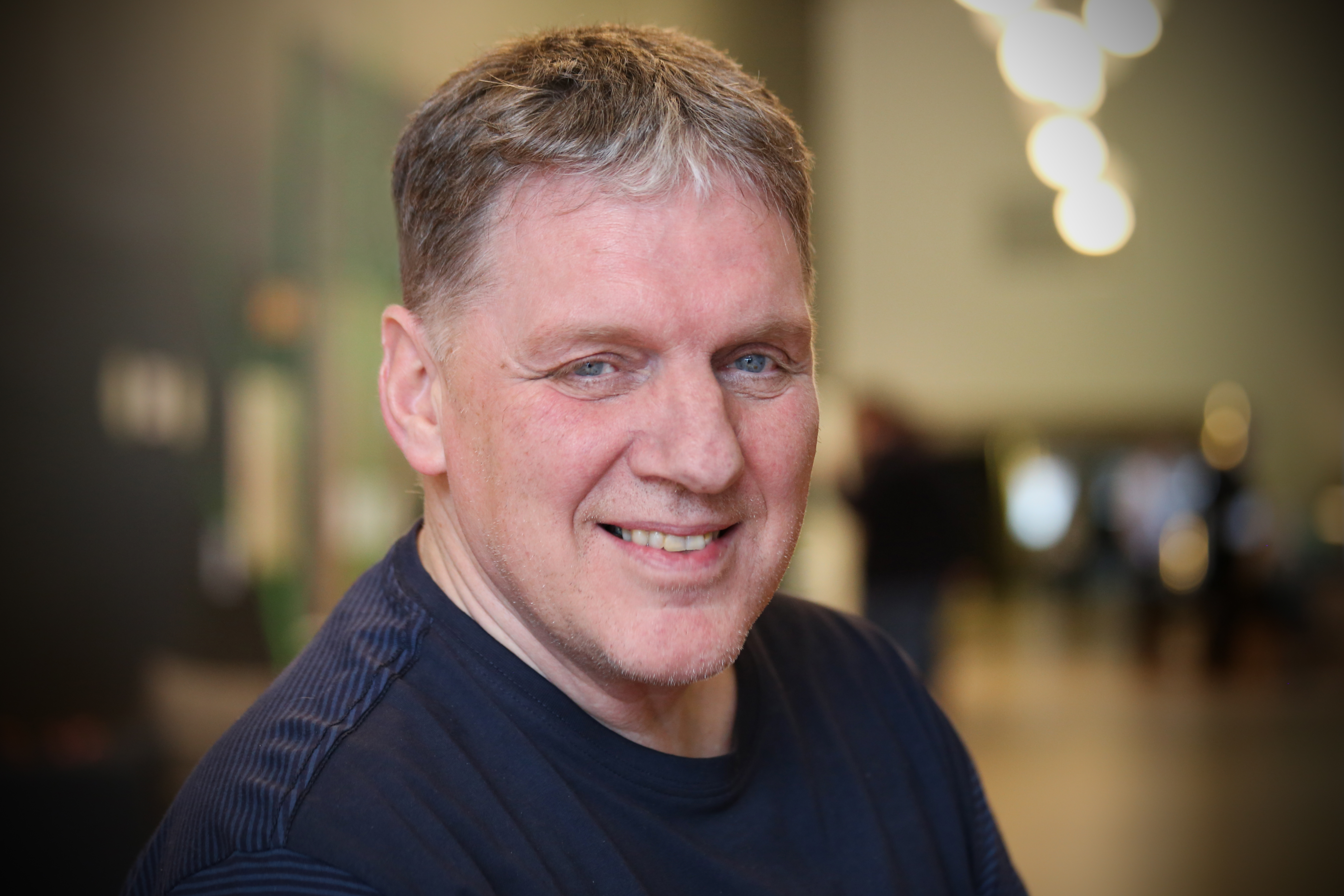
- Geir Adelsten Iversen in 2017
- Born: 20 September 1954 (age 72)
- Occupation: Politician

Geir Adelsten Iversen (born 20 September 1954) is a Norwegian politician. He was elected representative to the Storting for the period 2017–2021 for the Centre Party. He was re-elected to the Storting for the period 2021 to 2025.

He was a candidate for parliamentary elections in 2025, but was not re-elected for the next period.
