= Jan-Henrik Fredriksen =

Norwegian politician (1956–2020)

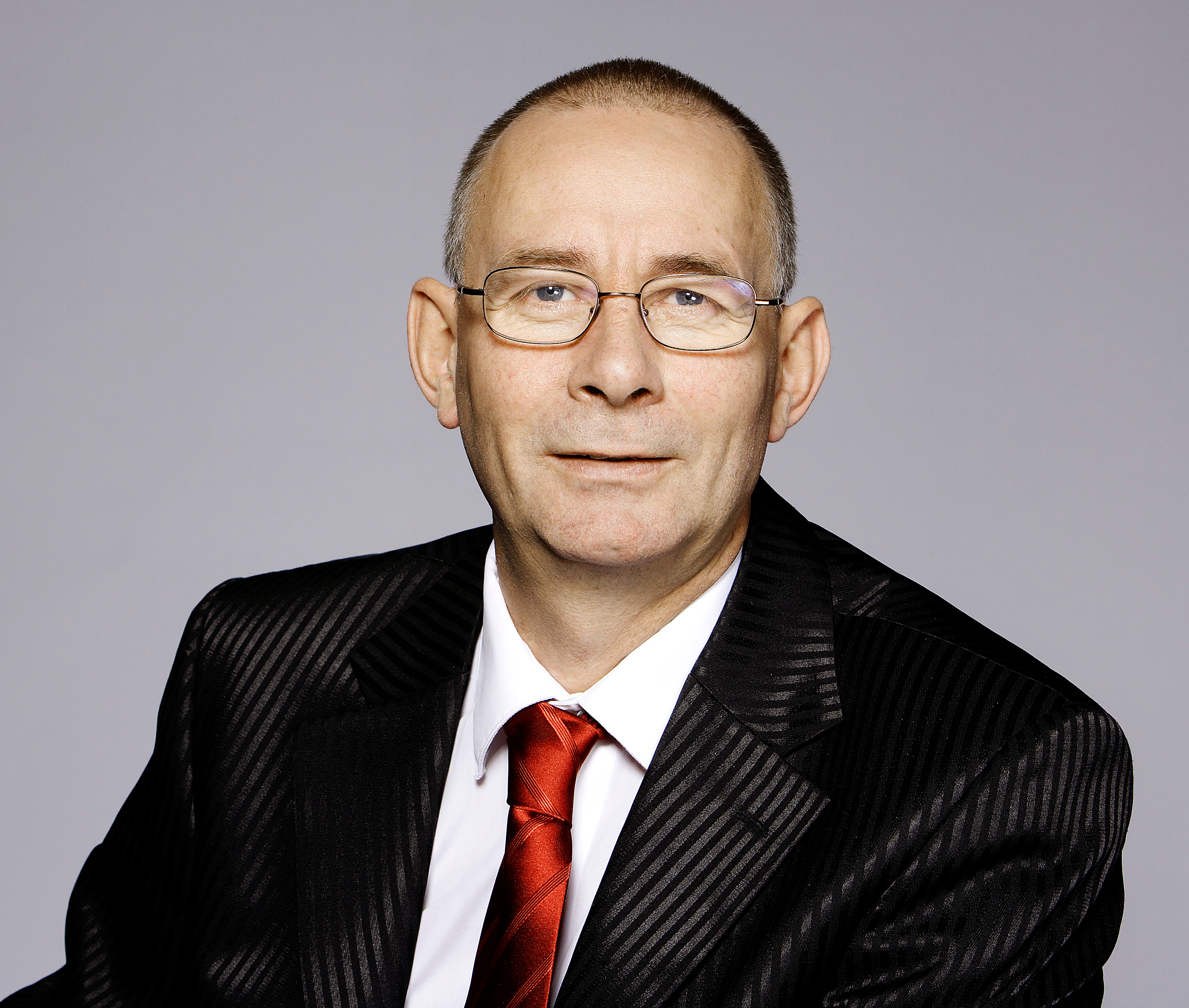
Norwegian politician Jan-Henrik Fredriksen

Jan-Henrik Fredriksen (2 October 1956 – 8 March 2020) was a Norwegian politician representing the Progress Party (FRP). He was a representative of Finnmark in the Storting. He was born in Kragerø, Telemark, and was first elected in 2005.

== Storting committees ==
- 2005–2009 member of the Healthcare committee.
