= Eva M. Nielsen =

Norwegian politician

Eva Margaret Nielsen (born 7 March 1950 in Kvænangen Municipality) is a Norwegian politician for the Labour Party. She was elected to the Norwegian Parliament from Finnmark in 2001, and has been re-elected on one occasion. She had previously served as a deputy representative during the term 1989–1993.

On the local level she was elected to the executive committee of the municipal council for Alta Municipality from in 1983, and later served as mayor from 1991 to 2001. She chaired the local party chapter from 1989 to 1992. During the same period she was also deputy leader of the county chapter as well as a member of the Labour Party national board.
