= Harry Johan Olai Klippenvåg =

Norwegian politician

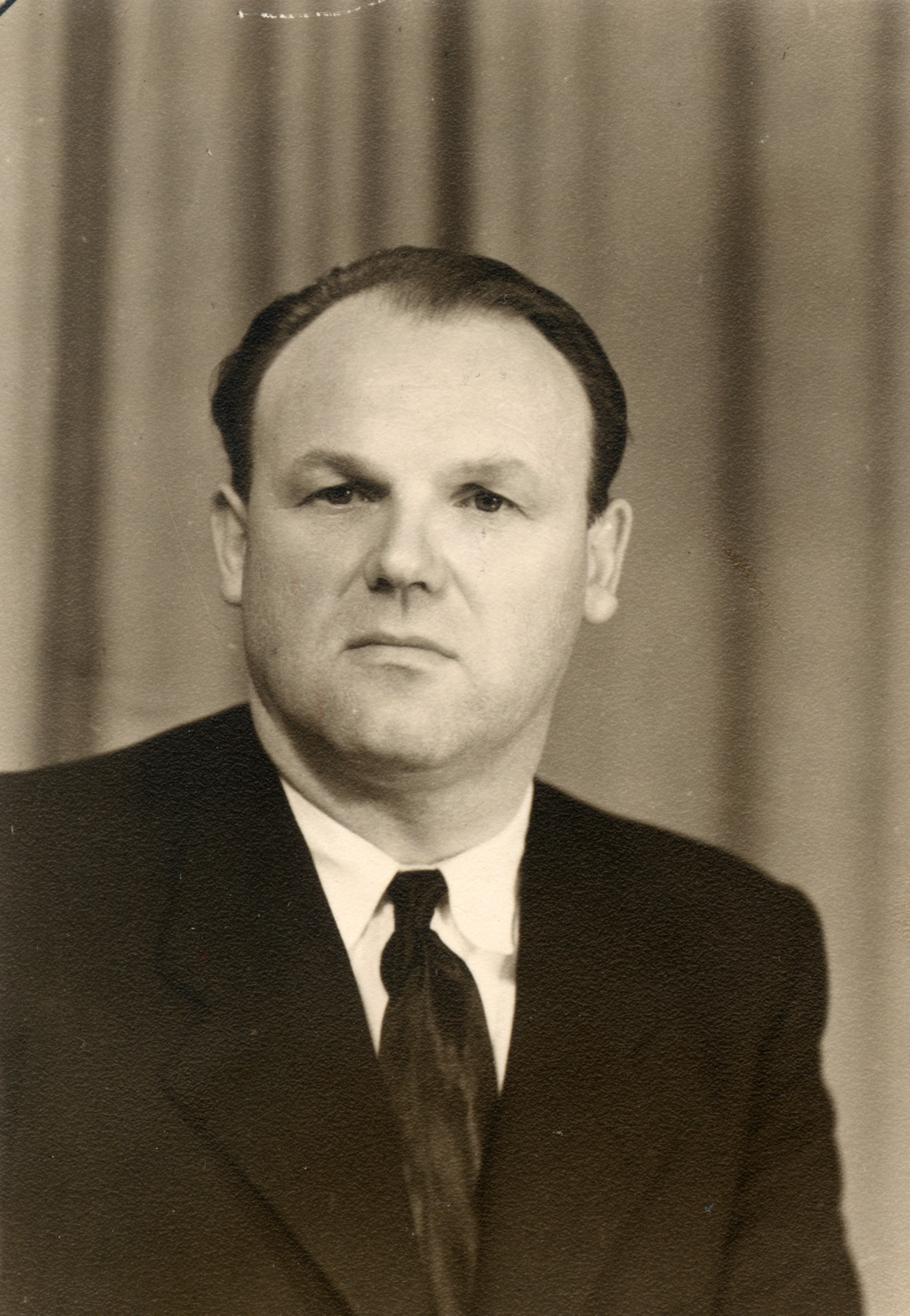

Harry Johan Olai Klippenvåg (12 May 1913 – 11 November 1994) was a Norwegian politician for the Labour Party.

He was born in Lurøy Municipality.

He was elected to the Norwegian Parliament from Finnmark in 1950, and was re-elected on four occasions.

Klippenvåg was mayor of Sør-Varanger Municipality during the terms 1947–1951 and 1951–1955. He was also a member of Finnmark county council from 1947–1949.
