= Sigurd Kvammen Rafaelsen =

Norwegian politician

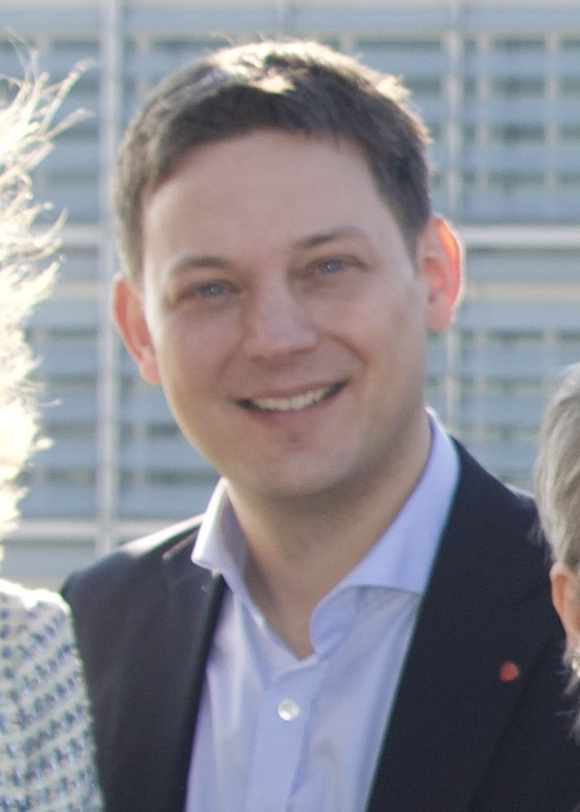

Member of the Storting
- Incumbent
- Assumed office 1 October 2025
- Constituency: Finnmark

Deputy Member of the Storting
- In office 1 October 2021 – 30 September 2025
- Deputising for: Marianne Sivertsen Næss (2024–2025)
- Constituency: Finnmark

Mayor of Lebesby Municipality
- In office 24 October 2019 – 21 October 2025
- Deputy: Kristin Johnsen
- Preceded by: Stine Akselsen
- Succeeded by: Kristin Johnsen

Personal details
- Born: 11 December 1985 (age 40) Sør-Varanger, Finnmark, Norway
- Party: Labour
- Domestic partner: Sigrid Ina Simonsen
- Children: 2
- Education: University of Tromsø
- Occupation: Teacher; Shop owner Politician

Sigurd Kvammen Rafaelsen (born 11 December 1985) is a Norwegian teacher and politician for the Labour Party (Ap). A deputy to the Storting from Finnmark between 2021 and 2025, he met as deputy for Marianne Sivertsen Næss between 2024 and 2025. He also served as mayor of Lebesby Municipality between 2019 and 2025. He is now a member of the Storting from the constituency of Finnmark.

== Personal life ==
Rafaelsen was born in Sør-Varanger Municipality on 11 December 1985. He is of Sámi origin and is one of three sons of former Sør-Varanger mayor Rune Rafaelsen and Inger Blix Kvammen.

He is currently in a relationship with Sigrid Ina Simonsen, the regional director of NHO Arctic. They both respectively have two children from previous relationships. Currently they're scheduled to marry in the summer of 2024.

== Political career ==
=== Local politics ===
An inhabitant of Kjøllefjord, Rafaelsen has been a member of the municipal council of Lebesby Municipality since 2015, and served as mayor from 2019, with Kristin Johnsen as deputy mayor. The duo were re-elected at the 2023 local elections despite Labour's significant losses in Northern Norway. When Rafaelsen got elected to the Storting at the 2025 election, acting mayor of Lebesby Kristin Johnsen permanently took over his duties as mayor of Lebesby Municipality.

He was elected leader of the Finnmark Labour Party in April 2024, succeeding former mayor of Nordkapp Municipality, Kristina Hansen, who had announced in January that she wouldn't seek re-election.

=== Parliament ===
Rafaelsen was elected deputy representative to the Storting from the constituency of Finnmark at the 2021 election. He was deputising for Marianne Sivertsen Næss from April 2024 while she was serving in government. Rafaelsen was elected regular representative to the Storting at the 2025 election.

== Civic career ==
Rafaelsen is a teacher by profession. He worked as a teacher at the school in Kjøllefjord between 2010 and 2015 before becoming the manager at Coop Kjøllefjord SA. He also holds a bachelor's degree in state science and has a year course in German from the University of Tromsø.

He has also chaired the interest organisations Naturressurskommunene and Landssammenslutningen av vindkraftskommuner since June and August 2023 respectively.
