= Raymond Robertsen =

Norwegian politician (born 1974)

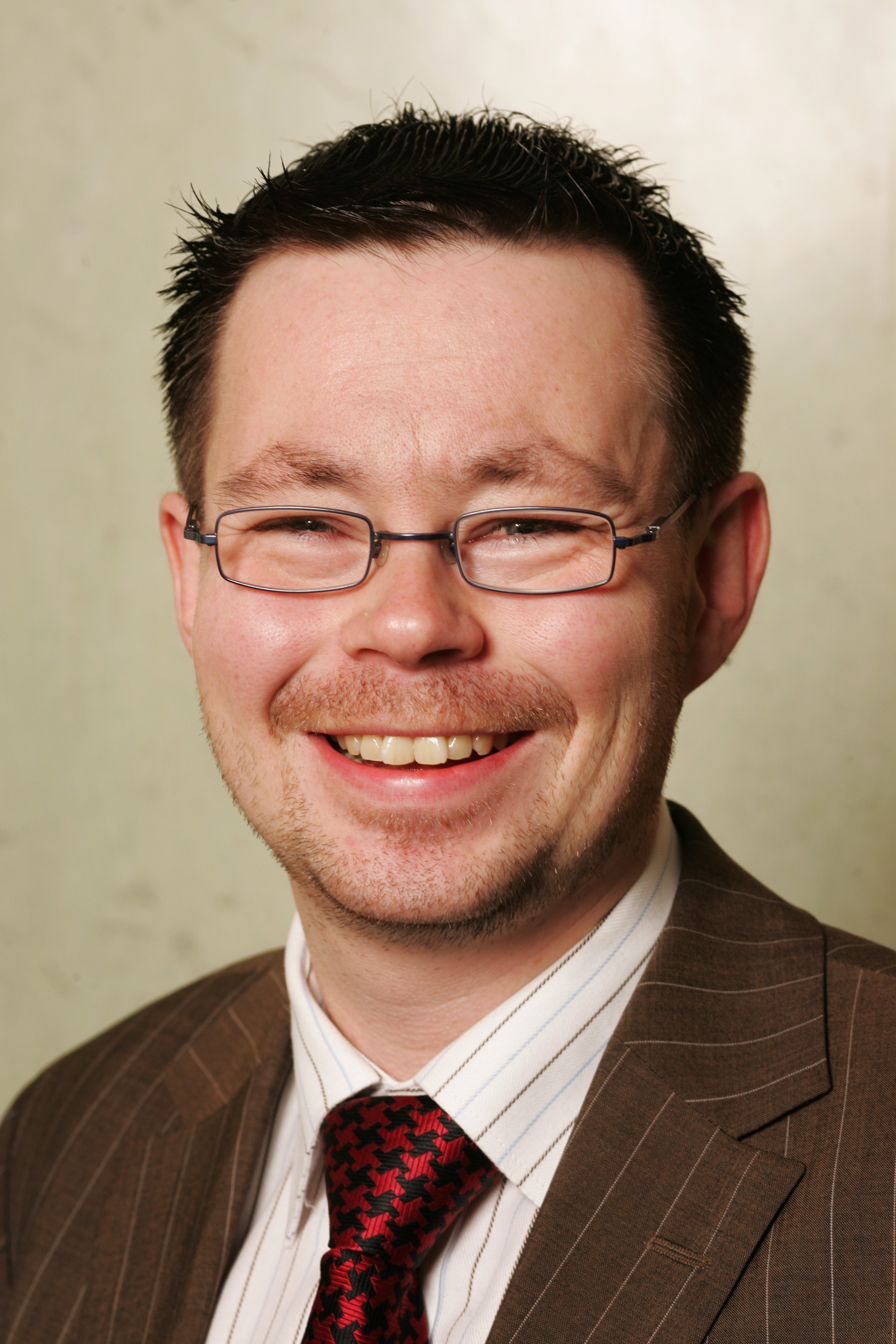
Raymond Robertsen

Raymond Robertsen (born 12 September 1974 in Hammerfest) is a Norwegian politician for the Conservative Party.

He was elected to the Norwegian Parliament from Finnmark in 2001, but was not re-elected in 2005.

Robertsen was a member of the executive committee of the municipal council of Hammerfest Municipality from 1995 to 2001. From 1995 to 2001 he was also involved in Finnmark county council.

On March 16, 2020, Robertsen was appointed as state secretary to the Minister of Regional Development and Digitalization.
