= Kåre Simensen =

Norwegian politician

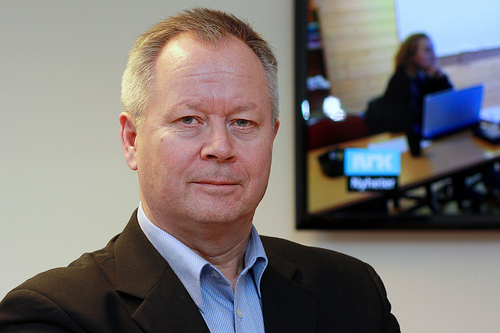
Kåre Simensen

Kåre Simensen (born 30 August 1955) is a Norwegian politician for the Labour Party.

He was born in Alta and finished secondary school here in 1978. Between lower secondary school and upper secondary school he worked in the shale industry. He then worked with IT. He took education as an IT engineer at Gjøvik Engineer's College from 1979 to 1982 and has a degree in economics from Finnmark University College in 1990.

He was a member of the municipal council of Alta Municipality from 1995 to 2007, serving the last term as deputy mayor. From 2007 to 2009 he was a member of the executive in Finnmark county council, and was also a board member of the Northern Norway Regional Health Authority. He was elected to the Parliament of Norway in 2009 as the party's second candidate from Finnmark.
