= Valter Gabrielsen =

Norwegian politician

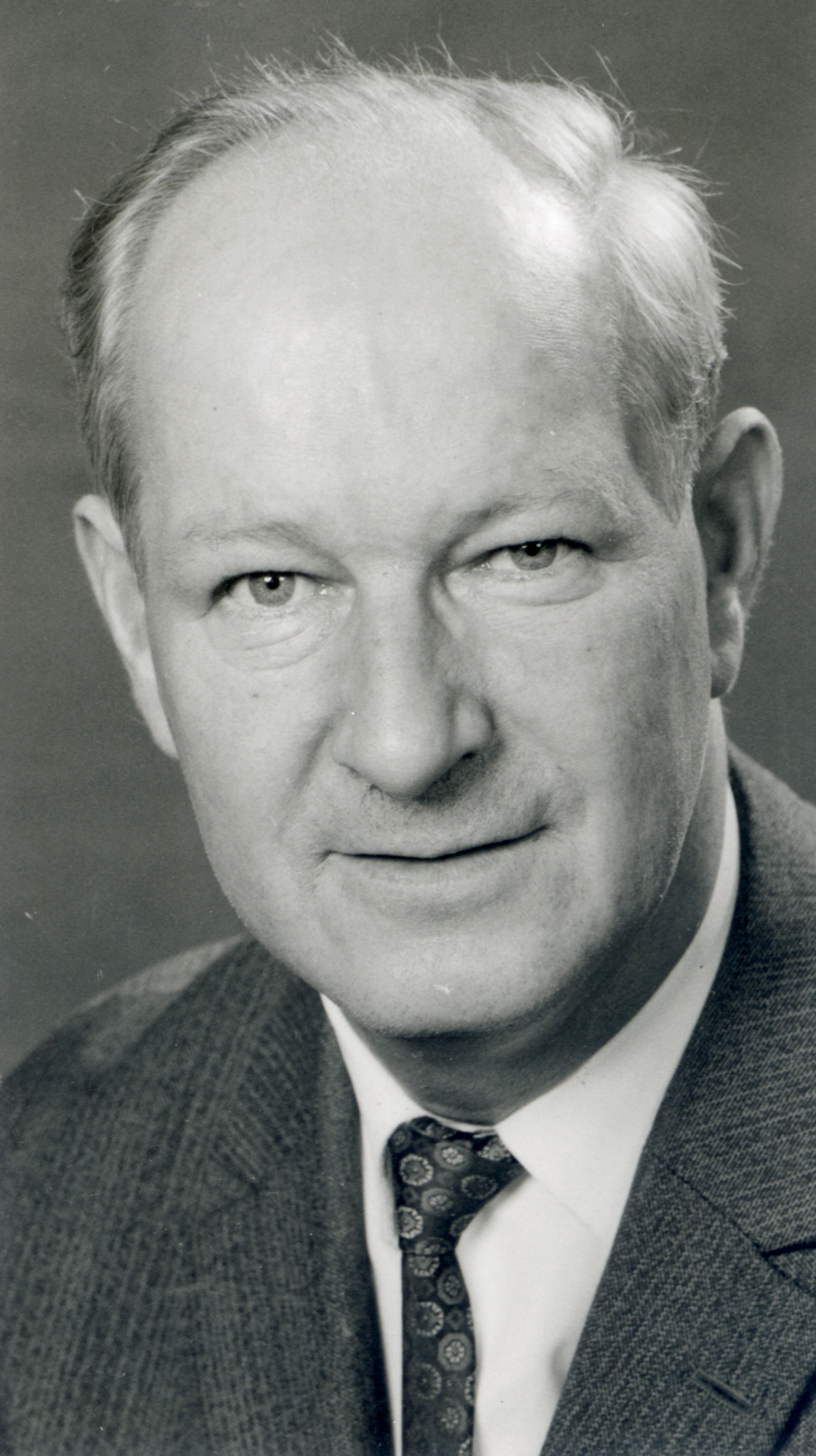

Valter Gabrielsen (4 February 1921 – 23 December 1999) was a Norwegian politician for the Norwegian Labour Party.

He was born in Fjell Municipality.

He was elected to the Norwegian Parliament from Finnmark in 1965, and was re-elected on three occasions. He had previously served in the position of deputy representative during the terms 1958–1961 and 1961–1965.

Gabrielsen was involved in on the municipal council for Vardø Municipality from 1947-1951 and also for Nordkapp Municipality from 1955-1965.
