= Oddvar J. Majala =

Norwegian politician (1932–2022)

Oddvar J. Majala (9 March 1932 – 3 March 2022) was a Norwegian Labour Party politician. He was elected to the Stortinget from Finnmark in 1981.

Majala was deputy mayor of Måsøy Municipality from 1975 to 1979 and mayor from 1979 to 1981.

== Stortings committees ==
During his time in parliament, he was part of the following committees:

- 1985–1989 member of Maritime and fisheries committee
- 1985–1989 deputy member of Electoral committee
- 1981–1985 member of Maritime and fisheries committee
- 1981–1985 deputy member of Electoral committee
