= Harald Nicolai Samuelsberg =

Norwegian politician

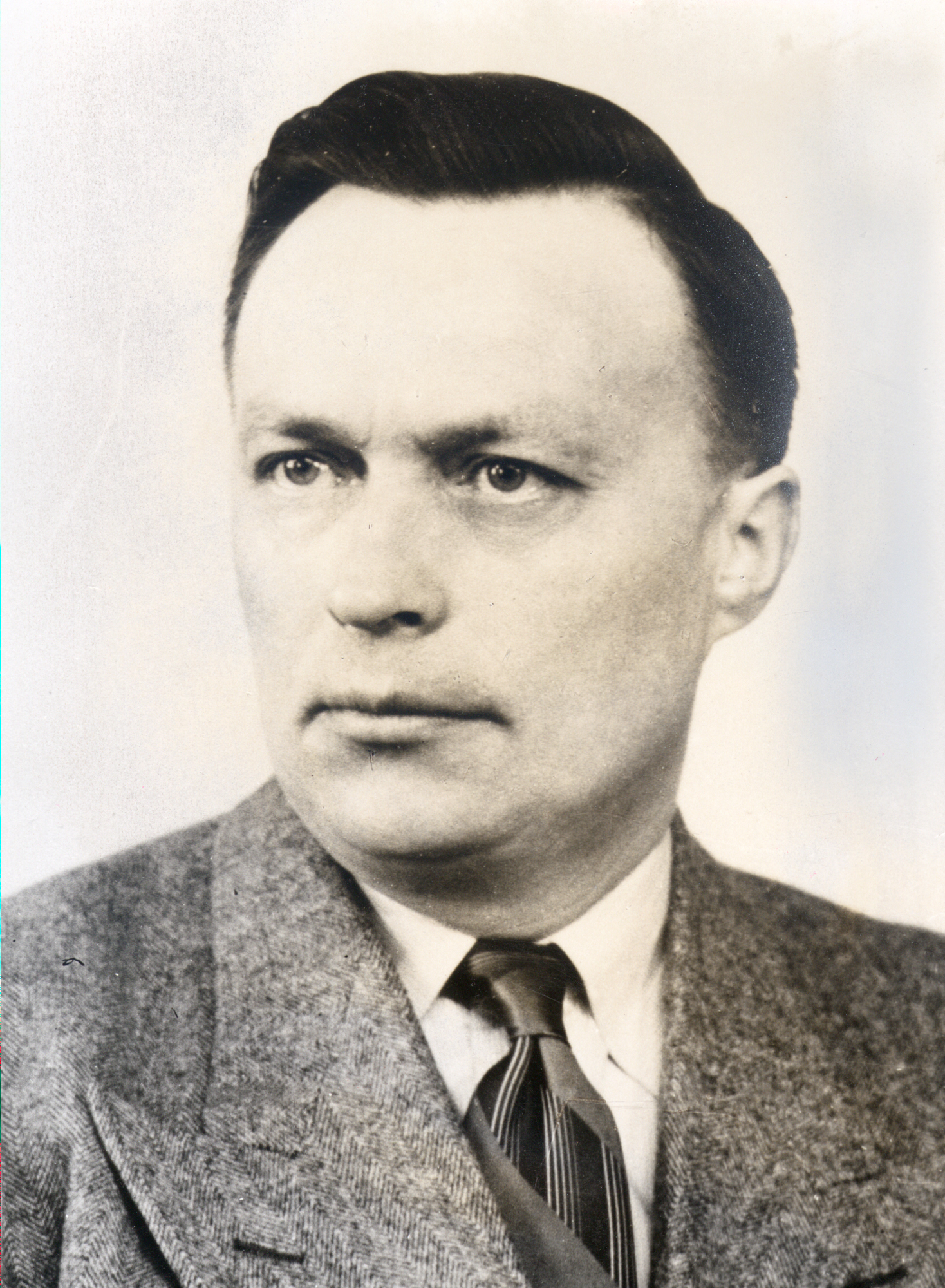

Harald Nicolai Samuelsberg (6 November 1911 – 23 April 1986) was a Norwegian politician for the Labour Party.

== Biography ==
He was born in Loppa Municipality and his only education was folk high school, which he completed at the age of seventeen.

He was elected to the Norwegian Parliament from Finnmark in 1958, and was re-elected on two occasions. He had previously served as a deputy representative in the period 1950–1953.

Samuelsberg was mayor of Loppa Municipality during the term 1959–1961, and deputy mayor in 1962–1963. In total he held various positions from 1937–1940 and 1947–1967.
