= Mimmi Bæivi =

Norwegian politician (born 1950)

Mimmi Bæivi (born 10 June 1950 in Sørøysund) is a Norwegian politician for the Labour Party.

She was elected to the Norwegian Parliament from Akershus in 1993, and was re-elected on one occasion.

Bæivi was a member of the municipal council of Sørøysund Municipality from 1979–1983, and later served as deputy mayor in 1986 and mayor in 1987–1991. She then became deputy mayor in Hammerfest Municipality from 1991–1995.
