= Jarle Simensen =

Norwegian historian (born 1937)

Jarle Simensen (born 23 March 1937, in Os Municipality in Hedmark) is a Norwegian historian.

He took the cand.philol. degree at the University of Oslo in 1966, and worked as a research assistant at the same university, a research fellow at the Norwegian Research Council and Institute of Social Research and, briefly, associate professor (førsteamanuensis) at the University of Trondheim before taking the dr.philos. degree in Trondheim in 1976. He was then a professor there from 1980 to 2004. He returned to the University of Oslo in 1996 to hold the position of adjunct professor (professor II); he is currently professor emeritus there.

He is a member of the Norwegian Academy of Science and Letters.

== Selected bibliography ==
- Commoners, Chiefs and Colonial Government. Akim Abuakwa, Ghana, under British Rule, 1975
- Afrikas historie. Nye perspektiver, 1983
- Norsk misjon i afrikansk historie. Sør-Afrika, 1984
- Norwegian Missions in African History. Vol. 1. South Africa 1845-1906, 1986; Vol.2: Madagascar, 1986
- Utdanning som u-hjelp. NORAD og fiskeriopplæringen ved Ghana Nautical College, 1964-1980, 1990
- Vesten erobrer verden, 1870-1914, volume 12 in Aschehougs Verdenshistorie, 1986
- Tyskland-Norge. Den lange historien, (ed.), 2000
