= Finnmark University College =

University college with three campuses throughout Finnmark, Norway

Coordinates: 70°40′25″N 23°40′28″E

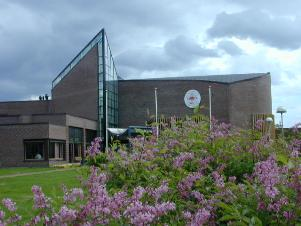
Campus in Alta

Finnmark University College (Norwegian: Høgskolen i Finnmark or HiF) was a university college with three campuses throughout Finnmark, Norway. In August 2013 Finnmark University College and the University of Tromso merged to form what is now called the "University of Tromso - Norway's Arctic University". The Faculty of Education and Liberal Arts and the Faculty of Business and Social Work is located in the town of Alta in Alta Municipality, while the Faculty of Nursing is located in the town of Hammerfest in Hammerfest Municipality. The Barents International School, part of the business school, was located in the town of Kirkenes in Sør-Varanger Municipality. The university college was established on 1 August 1994, and had approximately 2,000 students and 240 employees.

The original Finnmark University College was, and the recent incarnation of the University of Tromso - Norway's Arctic University is, affiliated with UArctic and offers an online Bachelor of Northern Studies (BNS) which is delivered in the English language and which is based upon the UArctic Bachelor of Circumpolar Studies programme. The BNS programme is available to students both within Norway and internationally, with students having the option to attend the Alta campus for their final BNS semester.

On 15 February 2013 the Norwegian government announced that the university college would merge with the University of Tromsø to form Universitetet i Tromsø - Norges arktiske universitet (The University of Tromsø - Norway's arctic university), effective as of 1 August 2013.
