= Lothe =

Lothe is a common family name in Scandinavian countries. It may refer to:

- Anders A. Lothe, 1875–1961), Norwegian teacher, newspaper editor and politician
- Bjørn Lothe (1952–2009), Norwegian politician
- Egil Lothe (1908–1990), Norwegian economist and civil servant.
- Håvard Lothe (b. 1982), Norwegian musician
- Ilse Lothe (1914–after 1945), guilty of crimes at Bergen-Belsen
- Jakob Lothe (b. 1950), Norwegian literary scholar and professor of English Literature
- Jakob Mathias Antonson Lothe (1881–1975) was a Norwegian politician
- Jens Lothe (1931–2016), Norwegian physicist
- Ragnhild A. Lothe (born 1958), Norwegian microbiologist and cancer researcher
