= Jakob Lothe =

Norwegian academic (born 1950)

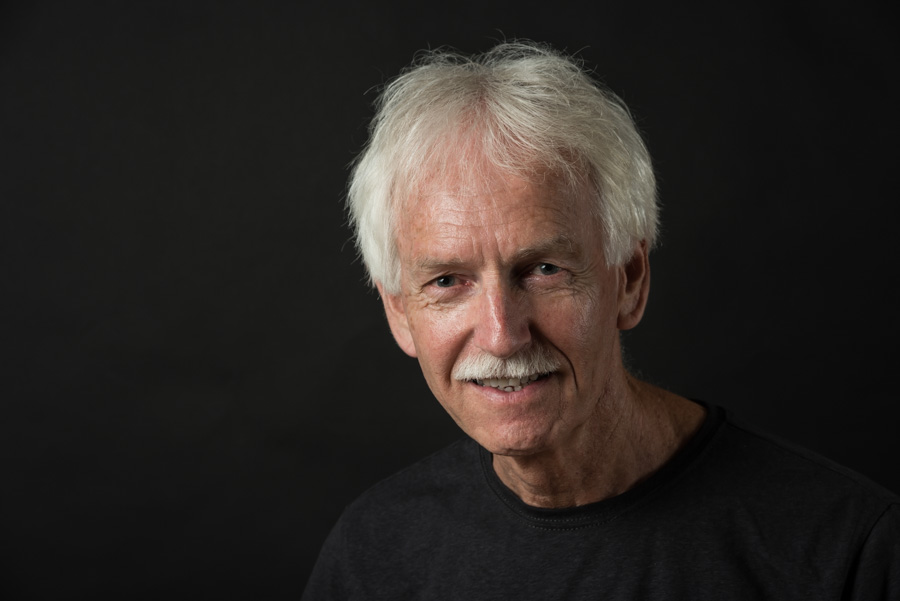
- Born: 1950 (age 75–76); Lote, Norway
- Education: University of Bergen (cand.mag. 1974, mag.art. 1977 dr.philos 1986); University of California, Santa Barbara (M.A. 1976)
- Occupations: Literary scholar and professor
- Spouse: Elin Toft
- Relatives: Jakob Mathias Antonson Lothe
- Writing career
- Language: English and Norwegian
- Website: jakoblothe.no

Jakob Lothe (born 1950) is a Norwegian literary scholar and Professor of English literature at the University of Oslo.

== Early life and education ==
After growing up in Lote, Norway, Lothe studied at the University of Bergen where he completed his undergraduate work. He then studied at the University of California, Santa Barbara where he obtained an MA degree in Comparative Literature, before receiving his doctorate in Bergen in 1986. In addition to his professorship in Oslo he has held positions at the University of Bergen and the University of Tromsø, and has been visiting professor at the University of Oxford, the University of Cape Town and Harvard University. He was elected to the American Philosophical Society in 2018. In 2019 a Special Issue of the journal Partial Answers (17,2) was dedicated to Lothe.

== Writings ==
His books include Conrad's Narrative Method (Oxford University Press, 1989) and Narrative in Fiction and Film (Oxford University Press, 2000). Lothe is also editor or co-editor of a number of books, including Joseph Conrad: Voice, Sequence, History, Genre (Ohio State University Press, 2008), with James Phelan and Jeremy Hawthorn, Franz Kafka: Narration, Rhetoric, and Reading, with Beatrice Sandberg and Ronald Speirs (Ohio State University Press, 2011), After Testimony: The Ethics and Aesthetics of Holocaust Narrative for the Future (Ohio State University Press, 2012), with Susan Rubin Suleiman and James Phelan, Narrative Ethics, with Jeremy Hawthorn (Rodopi, 2013), and The Future of Literary Studies (Novus Press, 2017).

In 2006 Lothe co-edited Tidsvitner (Time's Witnesses) with Anette Storeide, a book documenting the stories of eight Norwegians who survived nazi concentration camps during the Holocaust. The book was elected "Book of the Year" by the readers of the Norwegian newspaper Morgenbladet. In 2013 he edited Kvinnelige Tidsvitner: Fortellinger fra Holocaust (English version: Time's Witnesses: Women's Voices from the Holocaust. Fledgling Press, 2017). The book documents the stories of ten Jewish women who survived the Holocaust.

== Personal life ==
Lothe is a member of the Norwegian Academy of Science and Letters, where he in 2005-06 was leader of the research project "Narrative Theory and Analysis" at the Centre for Advanced Study. In the spring of 2018, Lothe was elected a member of the American Philosophical Society. He is married to Elin Toft. Jakob Mathias Antonson Lothe was his grandfather.

== Selected bibliography ==
- Nordic Travels (co-ed. and contributor 2021). ISBN 978-82-8390-078-1
- Nordic and European Modernisms (ed. 2021). ISBN 978-3-0365-1523-6
- Research and Human Rights (ed. 2020) ISBN 978-82-8390-044-6
- Time's Witnesses: Women's Voices from the Holocaust. (ed. 2017) ISBN 978-1-90591-690-0
- The Future of Literary Studies (ed. 2017) ISBN 978-82-7099-900-2
- Etikk i litteratur og film (2016). ISBN 978-82-530-3867-4
- Perspectives on the Nordic (co-ed. and contributor 2016) ISBN 978-82-7099-9
- Outposts of Progress: Joseph Conrad, Modernism and Post-Colonialism (co-ed. and contributor 2015) ISBN 978-1-77582-081-9
- Nordic Responses: Translation, History, Literary Culture (co-ed. and contributor 2014) ISBN 978-82-7099-762-6
- Narrative Ethics (co-ed. and contributor 2013) ISBN 978-904203-728-1
- After Testimony: The Ethics and Aesthetics of Holocaust Narrative for the Future (co-ed. and contributor 2012) ISBN 978-0-8142-5182-9
- Titanic: Historie, myte, litteratur og film (with Per Kristian Sebak) ISBN 978-82-530-3498-0
- Franz Kafka: Narration, Rhetoric, and Reading (co-ed. and contributor 2011) ISBN 978-0-8142-5177-5
- Joseph Conrad: Voice, Sequence, History, Genre (co-ed. and contributor 2008) ISBN 978-0-8142-5165-2
- Less Is More: Short Fiction Theory and Analysis (co-ed. and contributor 2008) ISBN 978-82-7099-493-9
- Literary Landscapes: From Modernism to Postcolonialism (co-ed. and contributor 2008) ISBN 978-0-230-55316-3
- Litteraturvitenskapelig leksikon (with Christian Refsum and Unni Solberg, second ed. 2007) ISBN 978-82-573-1714-0
- Tidsvitner: Fortellinger fra Auschwitz og Sachsenhausen (co-ed. 2006) ISBN 978-82-05-36362-5
- The Art of Brevity: Excursions in Short Fiction Theory and Analysis (co-ed. and contributor 2004, paperback 2011) ISBN 1-57003-557-1
- Joseph Conrad (2002) ISBN 82-05-30074-7
- English and European Modernisms (co-ed. and contributor 2002) ISBN 1-870041-49-6
- Franz Kafka: Zur ethischen und ästhetischen Rechtfertigung (co-ed. and contributor 2002) ISBN 3-7930-9277-1
- Identities and Masks: Colonial and Postcolonial Studies (co-ed. and contributor 2001) ISBN 82-7634-294-9
- Narrative in Fiction and Film: An Introduction (2000) ISBN 0-19-875232-6
- Conrad in Scandinavia (ed. and contributor 1995) ISBN 0-88033-972-1
- Conrad's Narrative Method (1989) ISBN 0-19-812961-0
