= Jostedal =

Jostedal may refer to:

== Places ==
- Jostedal Municipality, a former municipality in the old Sogn og Fjordane county, Norway
- Jostedal, or Jostedalen, a valley in Luster Municipality in Vestland county, Norway
- Jostedal (village), a small village area in the Jostedalen valley in Luster Municipality in Vestland county, Norway
- Jostedal Glacier, a large glacier in Vestland county, Norway
- Jostedal Church, a church in Luster Municipality in Vestland county, Norway
- Jostedalsbreen National Park, a national park in Vestland county, Norway
