= Finn Øen =

Norwegian businessperson and politician (1902–1979)

Finn Øen (12 April 1902 – 6 April 1979) was a Norwegian businessperson and politician for the Liberal Party. He was a member of Parliament from 1950 to 1953 and chief executive of Hardanger Sunnhordlandske Dampskipsselskap from 1934 to 1972.

== Early life ==
He was born in Vik as a son of bailiff and politician Anfin Øen (1868–1928) and Kari Røysum (1871–1949).

He finished his secondary education in 1920 and took the cand.jur. degree at the University of Oslo in 1925. He was the acting bailiff of Vik from 1925 to 1926 before serving as a deputy judge in Hardanger District Court for two years, then secretary in the Ministry of Justice from 1928.

== Career ==
In 1934 he was hired as chief executive officer of Hardanger Sunnhordlandske Dampskipsselskap, where he worked until 1972. In employers' organizations, Øen was a central board member of the Norwegian Employers' Confederation from 1937 to 1951, chaired Ruteskibenes Rederiforening from 1955 to 1958 and was a board member of Redernes arbeidsgiverforening. Øen was also a board member of Bergen Port Authority from 1946 to 1972 and Norsk Havnestyreforbund from 1969 to 1972.

Øen was a member of the executive committee of Bergen city council from 1945 to 1951. He served as a deputy representative to the Parliament of Norway from Bergen during the term 1945–1949. He was elected as a full representative in 1949, serving as a member of the Standing Committee on Transport and Communications, but was not re-elected in 1953.

In banking and insurance he chaired the board of Bergen Sparebank from 1963 to 1972 (board member since 1947), chaired the supervisory councils of Sparetrygden from 1945 to 1968, Forenede Liv from 1968 to 1972, Vesta and Investa from 1970 to 1972, Dalen Portland Cementfabrikk from 1966 to 1968 (council member since 1959) and the Norwegian Savings Banks Association from 1970 to 1972. He was deputy chair of the supervisory council in Norcem from 1968 to 1972 and a supervisory council member of Bergen Brandforsikringsselskap from 1945 to 1963 and Bergen Fiskeindustri.

Øen was also a member of the Council of the Order of St. Olav from 1962 to 1979, serving as vice chancellor from 1970 to 1979. He was decorated as a Commander of the Order of St. Olav in 1975.
