= Anders A. Lothe =

Norwegian politician

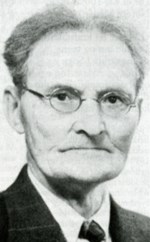
Anders Matias Abrahamsen Lothe

Anders Matias Abrahamsen Lothe (23 December 1875 – 1961) was a Norwegian teacher, newspaper editor and politician for the Labour Party.

He was born at Lote in Gloppen Municipality as the son of farmers Abraham Jakobsen Lothe (1841–1919) and Johanne Marie Jensdotter Lothe (1840–1900). He finished Seljord Teachers' Seminary in 1896, when he was hired as a teacher in Gloppen. From 1900 to 1901 he went back to school, a private middle school in Gloppen, and took his examination at Tanks School in 1901. He then worked as a teacher in Eikefjord Municipality from 1901 to 1908 and Sparbu Municipality from 1908 to 1910.

He became known as the first in Norway to write his middle school exam in Landsmål, and he also co-founded the Noregs Mållag branch Firda Mållag in 1899, chairing it from 1903 to 1908. From 1910 to 1915 he was the editor-in-chief of Firda Folkeblad.

From 1915 to 1945 he was a primary school teacher in Florø. He was elected to the municipal council for Florø Municipality in 1913, not-reelected in 1916 but then steadily re-elected to serve from 1919 to 1940. He was the deputy mayor of Florø in 1925–1926, 1936 and 1940. He was also a member of Florø school board from 1914 to 1917 and 1920 to 1927. He thus took part in the foundation of Firda Upper Secondary School in 1920, chairing its supervisory council from 1922 to 1933.

Lothe also co-founded the Sunnfjord branch of IOGT as well as the Kinn and Sunnfjord branches of the Labour Party. He chaired the local party branch, as well as the county branch from 1928 to 1934.

He was elected to the Parliament of Norway from Sogn og Fjordane in 1927, 1933 and 1936. The election in 1940 did not take place owing to the occupation of Norway by Nazi Germany. Lothe was arrested by the authorities in January 1943, incarcerated in Bergen Prison until February, then Ulven concentration camp until May, then Grini concentration camp from May 1943 to July 1944.

He died in 1961. A street has been named after him in Florø.
