= Kåre Øvregard =

Norwegian politician (1933–2025)

Kåre Øvregard (19 February 1933 – 30 January 2025) was a Norwegian politician for the Labour Party.

He was elected to the Norwegian Parliament from Sogn og Fjordane in 1977, and was re-elected on two occasions.

On the local level he was deputy mayor of Jostedal Municipality from 1959 to 1962. In 1963, Jostedal Municipality became a part of Luster Municipality, and Øvregard was a member of the municipal council for Luster Municipality from 1963 to 1977 (except for 1968, 1969 and 1970), serving as deputy mayor in 1965–1967 and mayor in 1975–1977.

Outside politics he graduated from Stord Teachers College in 1957, worked as a school teacher from 1957 to 1975 and rådmann in Luster Municipality from 1989 to 1994.
