= Paul Svarstad =

Norwegian politician

Paul Svarstad (6 March 1917 – 3 April 1998) was a Norwegian politician for the Conservative Party.

He was born in Innvik Municipality. He was elected to the Norwegian Parliament from Sogn og Fjordane in 1965, and was re-elected on one occasion.

Svarstad was involved in local politics in Innvik Municipality and its successor Stryn Municipality between 1952 and 1979, serving as deputy mayor of Innvik Municipality in the periods 1956–1959, 1959–1963, 1963–1964 and mayor of Stryn Municipality in 1975–1976.

He was a part of Milorg in 1943–1945.

== See also ==
- Politics of Norway
