= Hans Offerdal =

Norwegian politician

Hans Offerdal (23 September 1909 – 19 August 1980) was a Norwegian politician for the Labour Party.

He was born in Lærdal Municipality. He was elected to the Norwegian Parliament from Sogn og Fjordane in 1958, and was re-elected on one occasion. He had previously been a deputy representative in the period 1945–1949, and later served in the same position from 1965–1969.

Offerdal was a member of the municipal council of Lærdal Municipality in the period 1945–1947 and on the municipal council of Leikanger Municipality from 1951–1955.
