= Lars Lefdal =

Norwegian politician (1939–2024)

Lars Lefdal (17 March 1939 – 23 January 2024) was a Norwegian politician for the Conservative Party.

== Biography ==
Born in Davik Municipality on 17 March 1939, Lefdal was elected to the Norwegian Parliament from Sogn og Fjordane in 1977, and was re-elected on two occasions.

On the local level he was a member of the municipal council of Leikanger Municipality from 1975 to 1979, serving the first two years as mayor. He chaired the local party chapter from 1973 to 1975, and was a member of the central party board from 1986 to 1987.

Outside politics he graduated as civil engineer from the Norwegian Institute of Technology in 1962. He spent his professional career as an engineer in the Norwegian Public Roads Administration and the Directorate of Public Roads, reaching the pinnacle as regional roads director from 1989 to 2002.

Lefdal died on 23 January 2024, at the age of 84.
