= Anfin Øen =

Norwegian politician

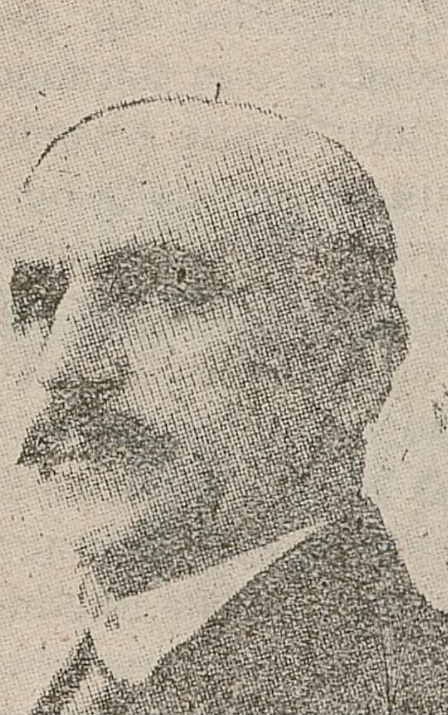

Anfin Øen (2 August 1868 – 14 February 1928) was a Norwegian bailiff and politician for the Liberal and Agrarian parties.

He was born at Øen in Hyllestad Municipality as a son of farmers Anfin Anfinsen Øen (1840–1919) and Helene Jørgensdatter Rønseth (1840–1921). He attended Nordre Bergenhus Amt Agricultural School from 1887 to 1889 and then took an office job in the county administration. In 1897 he was named as bailiff of Vik i Sogn, a position he held until his death. He was also director of the local savings bank from 1899 to his death. He also chaired the board of Gaula Kraftselskap and was involved in several agricultural organizations.

He was a member of the municipal council of Vik Municipality from 1900 to 1925. He originally fielded for the Liberal Party, but when the Agrarian Party was founded he was a member of the national board from 1924 to 1928.

He served as a deputy representative to the Parliament of Norway during the terms 1906–1909, 1913–1915, and 1919–1921 before being elected as a full representative from Sogn og Fjordane in 1921, 1924 and 1927. In 1928 he was briefly Vice President of the Storting. He served as a member of parliament until his death in February 1928, his third term being cut drastically short. He was replaced by Olav L. Os.

He was the father of Finn Øen.
