= Astrid Marie Nistad =

Norwegian politician

Astrid Marie Nistad (born 9 December 1938 in Fjaler Municipality) is a Norwegian politician for the Labour Party.

When Gro Harlem Brundtland formed her second cabinet in 1986, Nistad was appointed State Secretary in the Ministry of Petroleum and Energy.

She was then elected to the Norwegian Parliament from Sogn og Fjordane in 1989, and was re-elected on two occasions.
