= Ingrid Heggø =

Norwegian politician (born 1961)

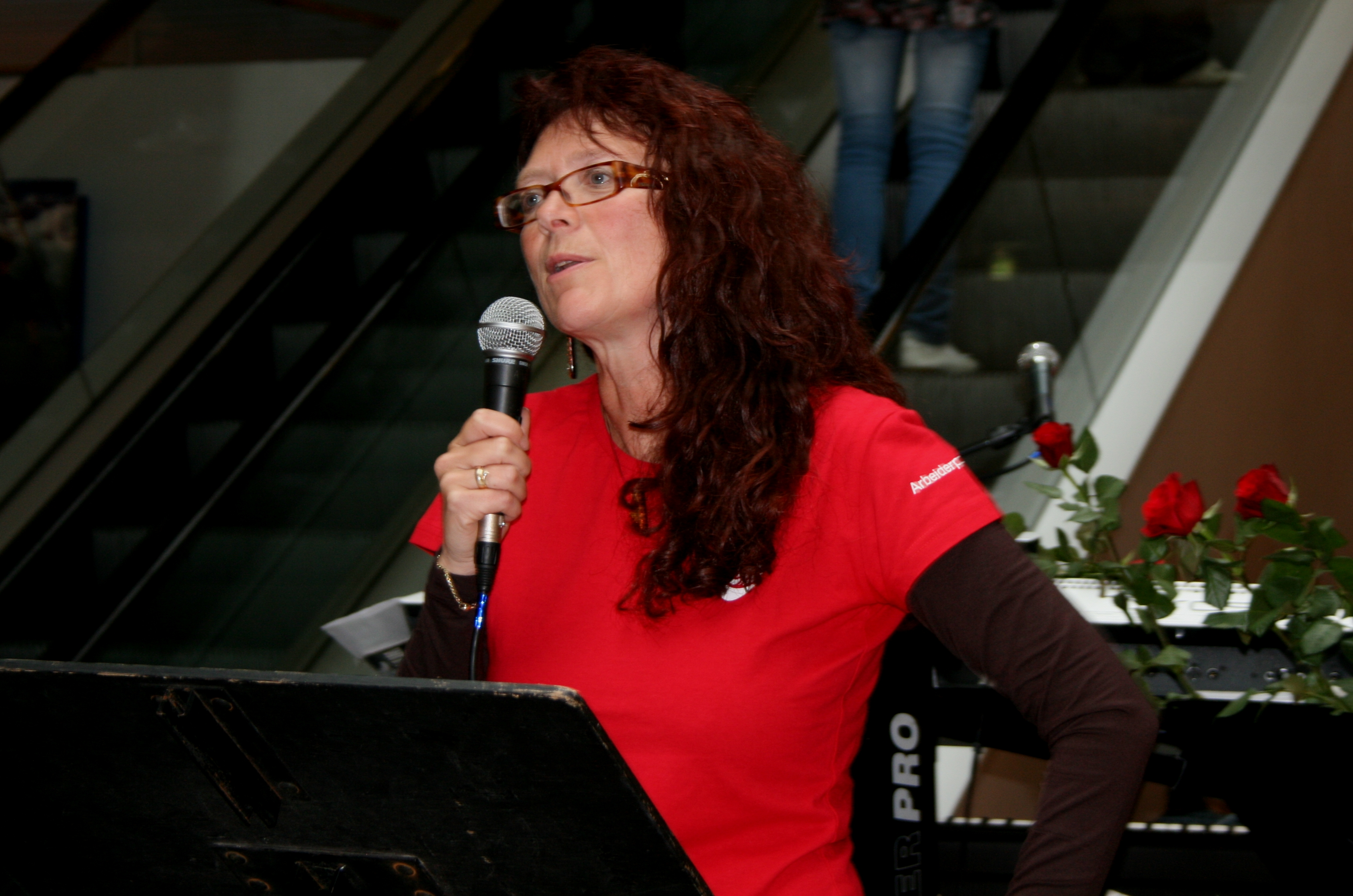
Ingrid Heggø

Ingrid Heggø (born 12 August 1961, in Høyanger) is a Norwegian politician for the Labour Party.

She was elected to the Norwegian Parliament from Sogn og Fjordane in 2005. She had previously served as a deputy representative during the term 1997–2001.

Heggø was a member of the municipal council of Høyanger Municipality from 1991 to 2003, serving the last eight years as deputy mayor. Since 2007 she has been a member of the Labour Party central board.
