= Leiv Blakset =

Norwegian politician

- Born: 28 December 1928; Herøy Municipality, Norway
- Died: 22 May 2005 (aged 76)
- Occupation: Politician

Leiv Blakset (28 December 1928 – 22 May 2005) was a Norwegian farmer, teacher and politician.

== Biography ==
Blakset was born in Herøy Municipality to Knut Blakset and Agnes Olivia Bergset.

He became a farmer in Stryn Municipality, educated as agronomist in 1949. He graduated as schoolteacher in Elverum Municipality in 1966, thereafter working as teacher in Stryn, and as rector from 1977 to 1995.

Taking part in local politics, he was deputy mayor of Stryn Municipality from 1973 to 1977, and served as mayor of Stryn Municipality from 1977.

He was elected representative to the Storting from the constituency of Sogn og Fjordane for the period 1985–1989 for the Centre Party.
