= Jorunn Ringstad =

Norwegian politician (1943–2018)

Jorunn Ringstad (3 September 1943 – 12 September 2018) was a Norwegian politician for the Centre Party.

She was elected to the Norwegian Parliament from Sogn og Fjordane in 1993, and was re-elected on two occasions. She had previously served in the position of deputy representative during the term 1989–1993.

Ringstad served as mayor of Askvoll Municipality from 1987 to 1993.
