= Ludvig Olai Botnen =

Norwegian politician (1910–1987)

Ludvig Olai Botnen (27 March 1910 – 29 April 1987) was a Norwegian Liberal politician, newspaper editor, and journalist.

== Early life and journalism career ==
He was born in Førde Municipality on 27 March 1910, the son of Andreas M. Botnen (1846–1930) and Anne Bergitte Nøstdal (1866–1953). His father was a farmer.

Outside politics he worked in newspapers. He was a journalist at Firda in 1931, became secretary in Hordaland Folkeblad in 1933 and then editor-in-chief of Firda Folkeblad from 1934 to 1942 and 1945 to 1976, interrupted by the German occupation of Norway.

== Political career ==
He was elected to the Norwegian Parliament from Sogn og Fjordane in 1961, and was re-elected on one occasion. He had previously been a deputy representative in the periods 1950–1953 and 1954–1957.

Botnen was deputy mayor of Florø municipality in 1954, and mayor in 1955, 1955–1957 and 1959–1961. He then served as mayor of Flora Municipality in 1975–1979. At that point he had held various positions in local politics in Florø and Flora for 34 years. He headed the party chapter on county level from 1951 to 1960.
