= Jostedal Municipality =

Former municipality in Sogn og Fjordane county, Norway

Jostedal Municipality Jostedal herad
- Former municipality
- Jostedalen herred (historic name)
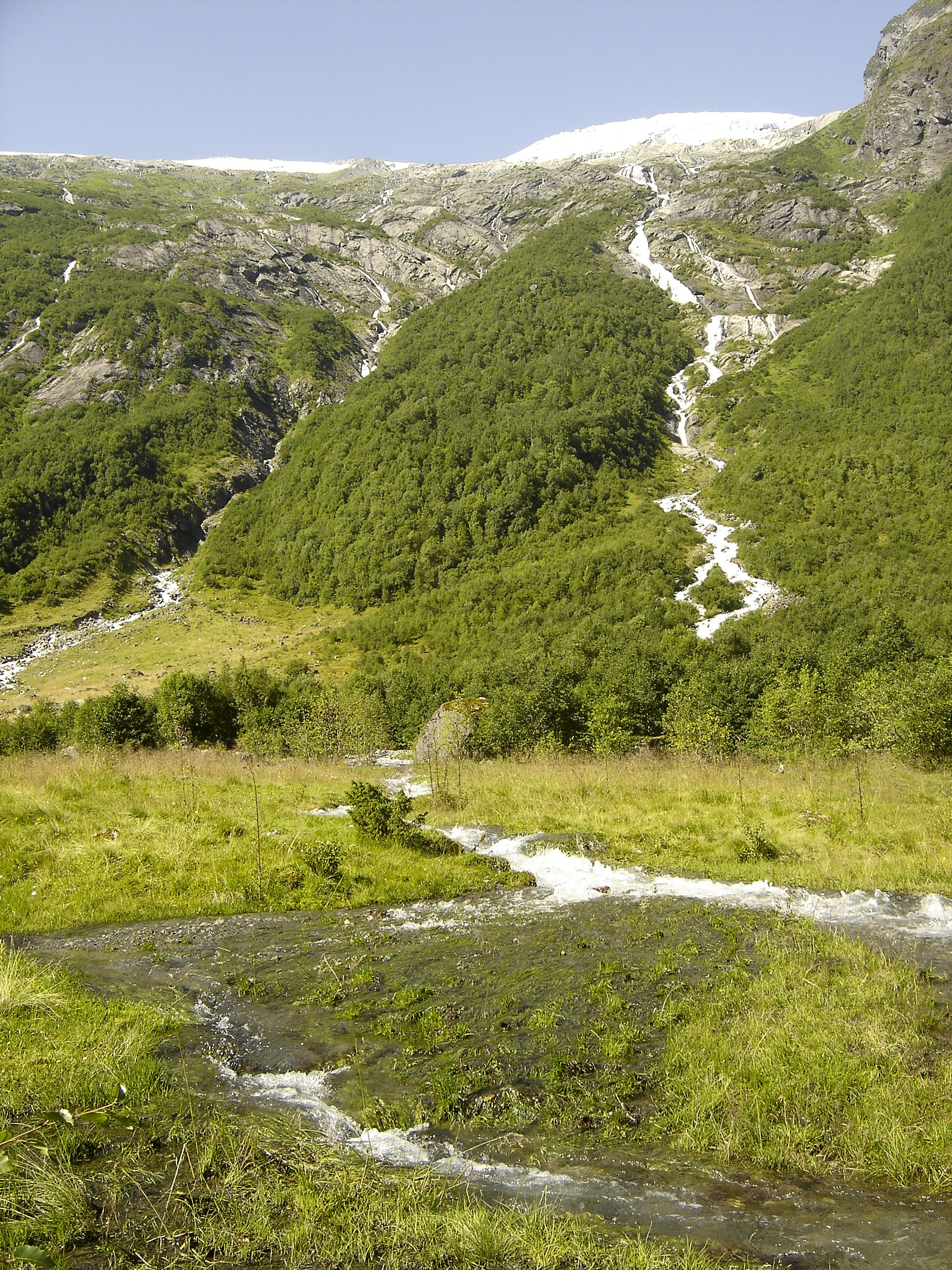
- Short canyon near Jostedalsbreen glacier

- Sogn og Fjordane within Norway

- Jostedal within Sogn og Fjordane
- Coordinates: 61°35′14″N 07°16′59″E
- Country: Norway
- County: Sogn og Fjordane
- District: Sogn
- Established: 1 Jan 1838
  - Created as: Formannskapsdistrikt
- Disestablished: 1 Jan 1963
  - Succeeded by: Luster Municipality
- Administrative centre: Jostedal

Government
  - Mayor (1956–1963): Johannes Grov

Area (upon dissolution)
  - Total: 529.2 km^{2} (204.3 sq mi)
  - Rank: #190 in Norway
- Highest elevation: 2,083 m (6,834 ft)

Population (1962)
  - Total: 810
  - Rank: #655 in Norway
  - Density: 1.5/km^{2} (3.9/sq mi)
  - Change (10 years): ▼ −5.5%
- Demonym: Jostedøl

Official language
  - Norwegian form: Nynorsk
- Time zone: UTC+01:00 (CET)
  - Summer (DST): UTC+02:00 (CEST)
- ISO 3166 code: NO-1427

Jostedal is a former municipality in the old Sogn og Fjordane county, Norway. The 529.2-square-kilometre (204.3 sq mi) municipality existed from 1838 until its dissolution in 1963. The area is now part of Luster Municipality in the traditional district of Sogn in Vestland county. The administrative centre was the village of Jostedal.

Prior to its dissolution in 1963, the 529.2-square-kilometre (204.3 sq mi) municipality was the 190th largest by area out of the 705 municipalities in Norway. Jostedal Municipality was the 655th most populous municipality in Norway with a population of about 810. The municipality's population density was 1.5 inhabitants per square kilometre (3.9/sq mi) and its population had decreased by 5.5% over the previous 10-year period.

== General information ==
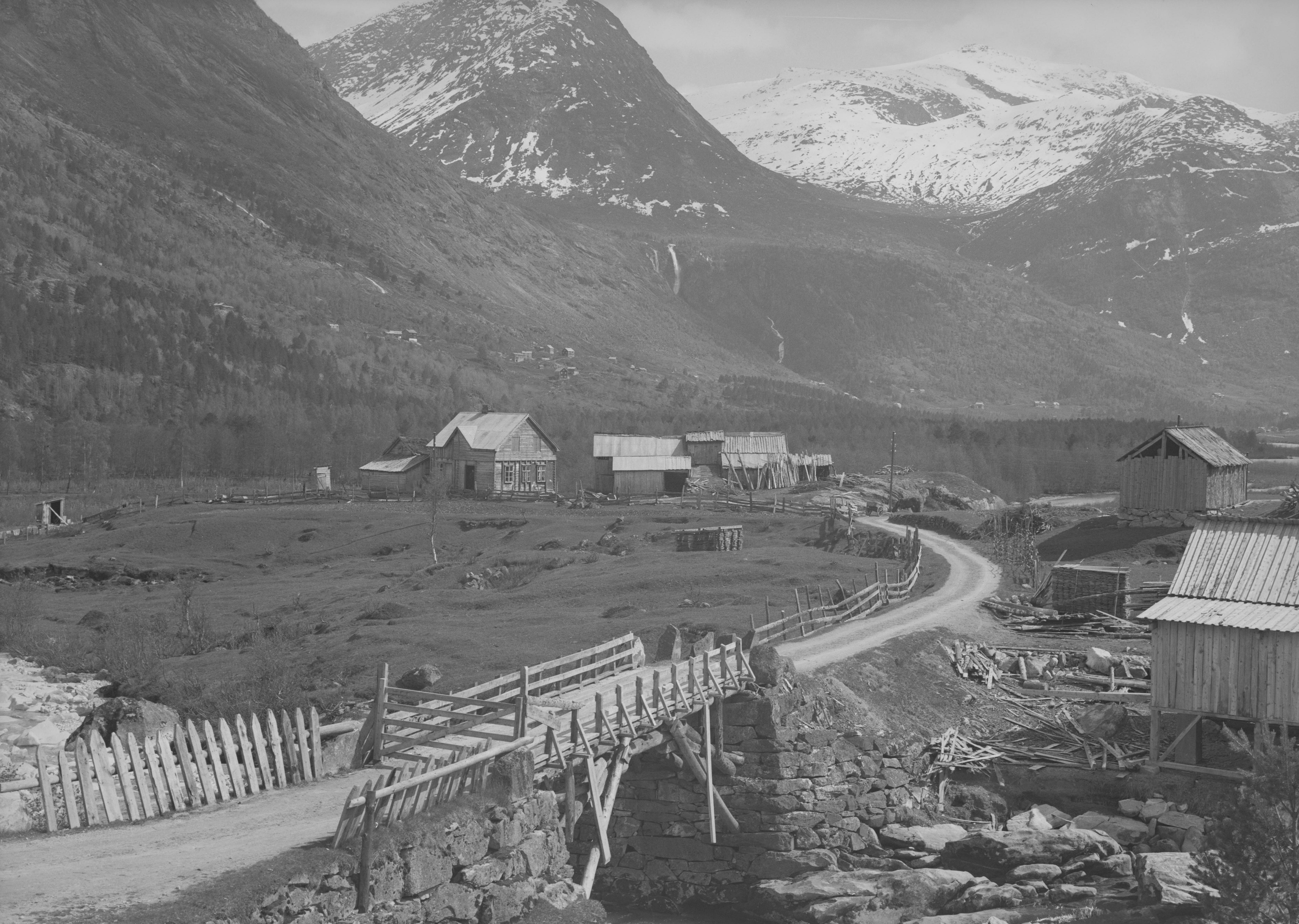
View of Jostedal Municipality c. 1940

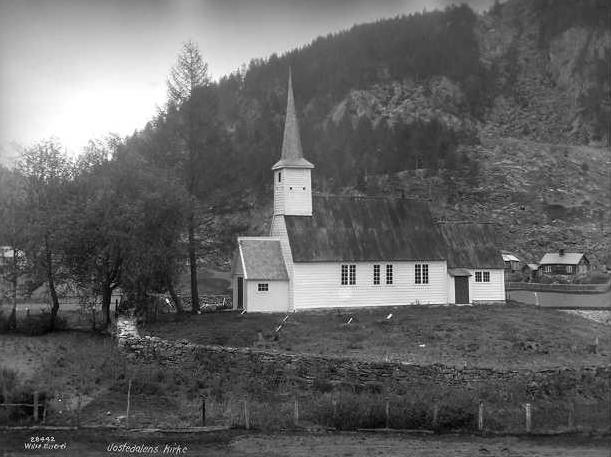
Jostedal Church

The parish of Jostedal was established as a municipality on 1 January 1838 (see formannskapsdistrikt law). During the 1960s, there were many municipal mergers across Norway due to the work of the Schei Committee. On 1 January 1963, Jostedal Municipality (population: 796) was merged with the neighboring Luster Municipality (population: 2,674) and Hafslo Municipality (population: 2,384) which created a new, larger Luster Municipality.

=== Name ===
The municipality (originally the parish) is named after the Jostedalen valley (Old Norse: Jǫstrudalr) since the first Jostedal Church was built there.

The first element is Jastra which is the old name for the river Jostedøla. The name comes from the genitive case of the word jǫstr which means "yeast". This name is likely due to the fact that the water in the river comes from glaciers and during the summer time the river gets "frothy" or "foamy" due to all of the melting ice and the many waterfalls. The last element is dalr which means "valley" or "dale".

Historically, the name of the municipality was spelled Jostedalen. On 3 November 1917, a royal resolution changed the spelling of the name of the municipality to Jostedal, removing the definite form ending -en.

=== Churches ===
The Church of Norway had one parish (sokn) within Jostedal Municipality. At the time of the municipal dissolution, it was part of the Jostedal prestegjeld and the Indre Sogn prosti (deanery) in the Diocese of Bjørgvin.

Churches in Jostedal Municipality
Parish (sokn)	Church name	Location of the church	Year built
Jostedal	Jostedal Church	Jostedal	1660

== Geography ==
The former municipality consisted of Jostedalen valley which empties into the Gaupnefjord at the village of Gaupne. The Gaupnefjord is an arm of the Lustrafjorden, which is an arm of the famous Sognefjorden, the second largest fjord in the world. There are three major glacial lakes in the area: Tunsbergdalsvatnet, Nigardsbrevatnet, and Austdalsvatnet/Styggevatnet (the suffix vatn is Norwegian for lake).

The river Jostedøla runs through the valley up to its headwaters at the Jostedalsbreen glacier, a plateau glacier which is the European mainland's largest with an area of 480 square kilometres (190 sq mi). Jostedalsbreen National Park and Breheimen National Park are located on either side of the Jostedalen valley. The highest point in the municipality was the 2,083-metre (6,834 ft) tall mountain Lodalskåpa on the northern border with Stryn Municipality.

Stryn Municipality was to the northwest, Skjåk Municipality (in Oppland county) was to the east, and Luster Municipality was to the south and west.

== Government ==
While it existed, Jostedal Municipality was responsible for primary education (through 10th grade), outpatient health services, senior citizen services, welfare and other social services, zoning, economic development, and municipal roads and utilities. The municipality was governed by a municipal council of directly elected representatives. The mayor was indirectly elected by a vote of the municipal council. The municipality was under the jurisdiction of the Gulating Court of Appeal.

=== Municipal council ===
The municipal council (Heradsstyre) of Jostedal Municipality was made up of 13 representatives that were elected to four year terms. The tables below show the historical composition of the council by political party.

Jostedal heradsstyre 1959–1962
Party name (in Nynorsk)	Number of representatives
Labour Party (Arbeidarpartiet)	9
Joint List(s) of Non-Socialist Parties (Borgarlege Felleslister)	4
Total number of members:	13
Note: On 1 January 1963, Jostedal Municipality became part of Luster Municipality.

Jostedal heradsstyre 1955–1959
Party name (in Nynorsk)	Number of representatives
Labour Party (Arbeidarpartiet)	6
Joint List(s) of Non-Socialist Parties (Borgarlege Felleslister)	7
Total number of members:	13

Jostedal heradsstyre 1951–1955
Party name (in Nynorsk)	Number of representatives
Labour Party (Arbeidarpartiet)	5
Joint List(s) of Non-Socialist Parties (Borgarlege Felleslister)	7
Total number of members:	12

Jostedal heradsstyre 1947–1951
Party name (in Nynorsk)	Number of representatives
Labour Party (Arbeidarpartiet)	6
Joint List(s) of Non-Socialist Parties (Borgarlege Felleslister)	6
Total number of members:	12

Jostedal heradsstyre 1945–1947
Party name (in Nynorsk)	Number of representatives
Labour Party (Arbeidarpartiet)	6
Joint List(s) of Non-Socialist Parties (Borgarlege Felleslister)	6
Total number of members:	12

Jostedal heradsstyre 1937–1941*
Party name (in Nynorsk)	Number of representatives
Labour Party (Arbeidarpartiet)	7
Joint List(s) of Non-Socialist Parties (Borgarlege Felleslister)	2
Local List(s) (Lokale lister)	3
Total number of members:	12
Note: Due to the German occupation of Norway during World War II, no elections were held for new municipal councils until after the war ended in 1945.

=== Mayors ===
The mayor (Nynorsk: ordførar) of Jostedal Municipality was the political leader of the municipality and the chairperson of the municipal council. The following people held this position:

- 1838–1839: Rev. Kjeld Andreas Bugge
- 1840–1841: Lars R. Faaberg
- 1842–1845: Rev. Michael Sundt Tuchsen Fasting
- 1846–1846: Lars T. Kronen
- 1847–1849: Rev. Christian Bastholm Heltberg
- 1850–1850: Anders A. Haugen (acting mayor)
- 1851–1853: Rev. Christian Bastholm Heltberg
- 1854–1855: I.H. Vamberg
- 1856–1856: Rev. Ole Christian Rasch
- 1857–1858: Lars T. Kronen
- 1859–1867: Rev. Ole Christian Rasch
- 1868–1869: Lars T. Kronen
- 1870–1874: Rasmus L. Faaberg
- 1875–1876: Rev. Andreas Emil Hansen
- 1877–1878: Tøger Kronen
- 1879–1880: Anders Christensen Ormbergstøl
- 1881–1883: Rev. Anton Hansen
- 1884–1896: Anders Christensen Ormbergstøl
- 1897–1904: Kristen Andersen Ormbergstøl
- 1905–1907: Lars Rasmussen Faaberg
- 1908–1910: Ole E. Myklemyr
- 1911–1922: Lars Rasmussen Faaberg
- 1923–1935: H.N. Bruheim
- 1836–1836: Hans Moen
- 1936–1937: H.N. Bruheim
- 1938–1939: Ove W. Haug
- 1940–1941: Hans Moen
- 1941–1945: K.R. Vigdal
- 1946–1947: Kristen Bakken
- 1948–1951: Johannes Grov
- 1952–1955: Hallvard Hesjevoll
- 1956–1963: Johannes Grov

== Notable people ==
- Kåre Øvregard (born 1933), a Norwegian politician
- Kristen Øyen (born 1938), a forester

== See also ==
- List of former municipalities of Norway
