= Sogn og Fjordane (Storting constituency) =

Constituency of the Storting, the national legislature of Norway

- Constituency for the Storting
- Location of Sogn og Fjordane within Norway
- Municipality: List: Årdal; Askvoll; Aurland; Bremanger; Fjaler; Gloppen; Gulen; Høyanger; Hyllestad; Kinn; Lærdal; Luster; Sogndal; Solund; Stad; Stryn; Sunnfjord; Vik
- County: Vestland
- Population: 110,184 (2025)
- Electorate: 79,086 (2025)
- Area: 18,433 km^{2} (2025)

Current constituency
- Created: 1921
- Seats: List: 3 (2013–present); 4 (2005–2013); 5 (1921–2005)
- Members of the Storting: List: Marius Langballe Dalin (MDG); Stig Even Lillestøl (FrP); Erling Sande (Sp); Torbjørn Vereide (Ap)
- Created from: List: Inner Sogn; Kinn; Nordfjord; Outer Sogn; Søndfjord

Sogn og Fjordane (lit. transl. Sogn and Fjordane) is one of the 19 multi-member constituencies of the Storting, the national legislature of Norway. The constituency was established in 1921 following the introduction of proportional representation for elections to the Storting. It consists of the municipalities of Årdal, Askvoll, Aurland, Bremanger, Fjaler, Gloppen, Gulen, Høyanger, Hyllestad, Kinn, Lærdal, Luster, Sogndal, Solund, Stad, Stryn, Sunnfjord and Vik in the county of Vestland. The constituency currently elects three of the 169 members of the Storting using the open party-list proportional representation electoral system. At the 2025 parliamentary election it had 79,086 registered electors.

== Electoral system ==
Sogn og Fjordane currently elects three of the 169 members of the Storting using the open (Note: Although technically elections to the Storting have open lists, they are in effect closed lists as a majority of those voting for a party must make changes to the lists for the changes to take effect, which has never happened since the introduction of proportional representation in 1921, and as result candidates are elected in the order submitted by the party.) party-list proportional representation electoral system. Constituency seats are allocated by the County Electoral Committee using the Modified Sainte-Laguë method. Compensatory seats (seats at large or levelling seats) are calculated based on the national vote and are allocated by the National Electoral Committee using the Modified Sainte-Laguë method at the constituency level (one for each constituency). Only parties that reach the 4% national threshold compete for compensatory seats.

== Election results ==
=== Summary ===
Election	Communists K			Reds R / RV / FMS			Socialist Left SV / SF			Labour Ap			Greens MDG			Centre Sp / Bp / L			Liberals V			Christian Democrats KrF			Conservatives H			Progress FrP / ALP		
Election	Votes	%	Seats	Votes	%	Seats	Votes	%	Seats	Votes	%	Seats	Votes	%	Seats	Votes	%	Seats	Votes	%	Seats	Votes	%	Seats	Votes	%	Seats	Votes	%	Seats
2025				2,542	3.98%	0	2,725	4.26%	0	19,779	30.94%	1	2,099	3.28%	0	10,245	16.02%	1	1,867	2.92%	0	2,735	4.28%	0	6,507	10.18%	0	13,315	20.83%	1
2021				2,489	4.01%	0	3,675	5.92%	0	16,426	26.46%	1	1,542	2.48%	0	17,634	28.40%	1	2,135	3.44%	0	2,389	3.85%	0	8,529	13.74%	1	5,771	9.30%	0
2017				790	1.27%	0	2,781	4.48%	0	15,258	24.56%	1	1,410	2.27%	0	18,446	29.69%	1	2,532	4.08%	0	2,683	4.32%	0	11,572	18.62%	1	6,153	9.90%	0
2013				386	0.63%	0	2,076	3.39%	0	17,183	28.09%	1	1,032	1.69%	0	12,619	20.63%	1	3,883	6.35%	0	4,952	8.10%	0	11,635	19.02%	1	6,608	10.80%	0
2009				541	0.92%	0	3,418	5.82%	0	17,375	29.60%	2	109	0.19%	0	14,782	25.18%	1	1,952	3.33%	0	3,984	6.79%	0	7,112	12.11%	0	9,287	15.82%	1
2005				359	0.60%	0	5,511	9.14%	0	17,774	29.47%	2				12,668	21.00%	1	3,503	5.81%	0	5,404	8.96%	0	5,062	8.39%	0	9,316	15.44%	1
2001				249	0.42%	0	7,055	11.77%	1	13,453	22.44%	1				10,615	17.71%	1	3,230	5.39%	0	9,743	16.25%	1	7,660	12.78%	1	5,989	9.99%	0
1997	28	0.04%	0	396	0.63%	0	3,262	5.22%	0	19,413	31.09%	2	49	0.08%	0	10,700	17.14%	1	5,734	9.18%	0	11,640	18.64%	1	6,187	9.91%	1	4,868	7.80%	0
1993				201	0.33%	0	4,817	7.92%	0	19,761	32.50%	2				17,536	28.84%	2	2,490	4.10%	0	7,536	12.39%	1	6,831	11.23%	0	1,189	1.96%	0
1989				483	0.75%	0	4,789	7.41%	0	20,324	31.44%	2				11,343	17.55%	1	3,391	5.25%	0	9,509	14.71%	1	10,589	16.38%	1	4,185	6.47%	0
1985	35	0.05%	0	353	0.55%	0	2,240	3.51%	0	23,577	36.95%	2				11,030	17.28%	1	2,903	4.55%	0	8,460	13.26%	1	14,135	22.15%	1	937	1.47%	0
1981				456	0.75%	0	2,200	3.61%	0	18,914	31.00%	2				8,568	14.04%	1	3,755	6.15%	0	9,392	15.39%	1	16,279	26.68%	1	1,090	1.79%	0
1977				274	0.49%	0	1,263	2.24%	0	18,289	32.50%	2				10,182	18.09%	1	2,882	5.12%	0	11,428	20.31%	1	10,503	18.66%	1	467	0.83%	0
1973				115	0.22%	0	4,259	8.11%	0	13,855	26.39%	2				12,052	22.96%	2	2,885	5.50%	0	11,021	20.99%	1	4,973	9.47%	0	1,291	2.46%	0
1969							577	1.09%	0	17,824	33.64%	2				8,919	16.83%	1	5,971	11.27%	0	10,463	19.74%	1	9,238	17.43%	1			
1965							1,169	2.32%	0	15,745	31.26%	1				10,283	20.42%	1	8,008	15.90%	1	7,439	14.77%	1	7,722	15.33%	1			
1961										16,114	34.96%	2				9,554	20.73%	1	7,258	15.75%	1	6,936	15.05%	1	6,225	13.51%	0			
1957										16,424	35.20%	2				10,096	21.64%	1	7,912	16.96%	1	6,707	14.38%	1	5,500	11.79%	0			
1953										15,869	33.04%	2				9,822	20.45%	1	8,609	17.92%	1	7,679	15.99%	1	6,056	12.61%	0			
1949	472	0.94%	0							16,362	32.50%	2				11,865	23.57%	1	15,128	30.05%	2				6,340	12.59%	0			
1945										12,689	30.06%	2				8,901	21.09%	1	13,112	31.06%	2				4,699	11.13%	0			
1936										10,141	23.18%	1				11,198	25.60%	1	15,314	35.01%	2				6,198	14.17%	1			
1933	233	0.62%	0							8,195	21.76%	1				11,104	29.48%	2	12,681	33.66%	2				5,456	14.48%	0			
1930	307	0.80%	0							5,956	15.61%	0				12,328	32.31%	2	13,568	35.56%	2				6,001	15.73%	1			
1927	338	1.12%	0							5,614	18.57%	1				9,009	29.80%	2	11,709	38.73%	2				3,558	11.77%	0			
1924	741	2.44%	0							2,079	6.85%	0				7,082	23.35%	1	11,891	39.20%	3				6,934	22.86%	1			
1921										2,781	9.43%	0				6,693	22.70%	1	11,912	40.40%	3				7,032	23.85%	1			

(Excludes compensatory seats. Figures in italics represent joint lists.)

=== Detailed ===
==== 2020s ====
===== 2025 =====
Results of the 2025 parliamentary election held on 8 September 2025:

Party		Votes	%	Seats		
Party		Votes	%	Con.	Com.	Tot.
Labour Party	Ap	19,779	30.94%	1	0	1
Progress Party	FrP	13,315	20.83%	1	0	1
Centre Party	Sp	10,245	16.02%	1	0	1
Conservative Party	H	6,507	10.18%	0	0	0
Christian Democratic Party	KrF	2,735	4.28%	0	0	0
Socialist Left Party	SV	2,725	4.26%	0	0	0
Red Party	R	2,542	3.98%	0	0	0
Green Party	MDG	2,099	3.28%	0	1	1
Liberal Party	V	1,867	2.92%	0	0	0
Generation Party	GP	531	0.83%	0	0	0
Norway Democrats	ND	390	0.61%	0	0	0
Conservative	K	273	0.43%	0	0	0
Pensioners' Party	PP	263	0.41%	0	0	0
Industry and Business Party	INP	259	0.41%	0	0	0
Peace and Justice	FOR	129	0.20%	0	0	0
DNI Party	DNI	110	0.17%	0	0	0
Welfare and Innovation Party	VIP	97	0.15%	0	0	0
Center Party	PS	69	0.11%	0	0	0
Valid votes		63,935	100.00%	3	1	4
Blank votes		468	0.73%			
Rejected votes – other		140	0.22%			
Total polled		64,543	81.61%			
Registered electors		79,086				

The following candidates were elected:

- Constituency seats - Stig Even Lillestøl (FrP); Erling Sande (Sp); and Torbjørn Vereide (Ap).
- Compensatory seat - Marius Langballe Dalin (MDG).

===== 2021 =====
Results of the 2021 parliamentary election held on 13 September 2021:

Party		Votes	%	Seats		
Party		Votes	%	Con.	Com.	Tot.
Centre Party	Sp	17,634	28.40%	1	0	1
Labour Party	Ap	16,426	26.46%	1	0	1
Conservative Party	H	8,529	13.74%	1	0	1
Progress Party	FrP	5,771	9.30%	0	0	0
Socialist Left Party	SV	3,675	5.92%	0	0	0
Red Party	R	2,489	4.01%	0	0	0
Christian Democratic Party	KrF	2,389	3.85%	0	0	0
Liberal Party	V	2,135	3.44%	0	1	1
Green Party	MDG	1,542	2.48%	0	0	0
Democrats in Norway		453	0.73%	0	0	0
Industry and Business Party	INP	293	0.47%	0	0	0
The Christians	PDK	253	0.41%	0	0	0
Pensioners' Party	PP	173	0.28%	0	0	0
Center Party		141	0.23%	0	0	0
Health Party		89	0.14%	0	0	0
Capitalist Party		47	0.08%	0	0	0
Alliance - Alternative for Norway		43	0.07%	0	0	0
Valid votes		62,082	100.00%	3	1	4
Blank votes		317	0.51%			
Rejected votes – other		56	0.09%			
Total polled		62,455	79.78%			
Registered electors		78,282				

The following candidates were elected:

- Constituency seats - Olve Grotle (H); Erling Sande (Sp); and Torbjørn Vereide (Ap).
- Compensatory seat - Alfred Bjørlo (V).

==== 2010s ====
===== 2017 =====
Results of the 2017 parliamentary election held on 11 September 2017:

Party		Votes	%	Seats		
Party		Votes	%	Con.	Com.	Tot.
Centre Party	Sp	18,446	29.69%	1	0	1
Labour Party	Ap	15,258	24.56%	1	0	1
Conservative Party	H	11,572	18.62%	1	0	1
Progress Party	FrP	6,153	9.90%	0	0	0
Socialist Left Party	SV	2,781	4.48%	0	0	0
Christian Democratic Party	KrF	2,683	4.32%	0	1	1
Liberal Party	V	2,532	4.08%	0	0	0
Green Party	MDG	1,410	2.27%	0	0	0
Red Party	R	790	1.27%	0	0	0
The Christians	PDK	255	0.41%	0	0	0
Health Party		110	0.18%	0	0	0
Capitalist Party		56	0.09%	0	0	0
Democrats in Norway		43	0.07%	0	0	0
The Alliance		43	0.07%	0	0	0
Valid votes		62,132	100.00%	3	1	4
Blank votes		319	0.51%			
Rejected votes – other		96	0.15%			
Total polled		62,547	79.48%			
Registered electors		78,693				

The following candidates were elected:

- Constituency seats - Ingrid Heggø (Ap); Frida Melvær (H); and Liv Signe Navarsete (Sp).
- Compensatory seat - Tore Storehaug (KrF).

===== 2013 =====
Results of the 2013 parliamentary election held on 8 and 9 September 2013:

Party		Votes	%	Seats		
Party		Votes	%	Con.	Com.	Tot.
Labour Party	Ap	17,183	28.09%	1	0	1
Centre Party	Sp	12,619	20.63%	1	0	1
Conservative Party	H	11,635	19.02%	1	0	1
Progress Party	FrP	6,608	10.80%	0	0	0
Christian Democratic Party	KrF	4,952	8.10%	0	0	0
Liberal Party	V	3,883	6.35%	0	1	1
Socialist Left Party	SV	2,076	3.39%	0	0	0
Green Party	MDG	1,032	1.69%	0	0	0
The Christians	PDK	515	0.84%	0	0	0
Red Party	R	386	0.63%	0	0	0
Pirate Party of Norway		151	0.25%	0	0	0
Coastal Party	KP	100	0.16%	0	0	0
Democrats in Norway		32	0.05%	0	0	0
Valid votes		61,172	100.00%	3	1	4
Blank votes		253	0.41%			
Rejected votes – other		61	0.10%			
Total polled		61,486	78.55%			
Registered electors		78,280				

The following candidates were elected:

- Constituency seats - Ingrid Heggø (Ap); Bjørn Lødemel (H); and Liv Signe Navarsete (Sp).
- Compensatory seat - Sveinung Rotevatn (V).

==== 2000s ====
===== 2009 =====
Results of the 2009 parliamentary election held on 13 and 14 September 2009:

Party		Votes	%	Seats		
Party		Votes	%	Con.	Com.	Tot.
Labour Party	Ap	17,375	29.60%	2	0	2
Centre Party	Sp	14,782	25.18%	1	0	1
Progress Party	FrP	9,287	15.82%	1	0	1
Conservative Party	H	7,112	12.11%	0	1	1
Christian Democratic Party	KrF	3,984	6.79%	0	0	0
Socialist Left Party	SV	3,418	5.82%	0	0	0
Liberal Party	V	1,952	3.33%	0	0	0
Red Party	R	541	0.92%	0	0	0
Coastal Party	KP	124	0.21%	0	0	0
Green Party	MDG	109	0.19%	0	0	0
Democrats in Norway		22	0.04%	0	0	0
Valid votes		58,706	100.00%	4	1	5
Blank votes		182	0.31%			
Rejected votes – other		57	0.10%			
Total polled		58,945	75.50%			
Registered electors		78,071				

The following candidates were elected:

- Constituency seats - Tor Bremer (Ap); Ingrid Heggø (Ap); Liv Signe Navarsete (Sp); and Åge Starheim (FrP).
- Compensatory seat - Bjørn Lødemel (H).

===== 2005 =====
Results of the 2005 parliamentary election held on 11 and 12 September 2005:

Party		Votes	%	Seats		
Party		Votes	%	Con.	Com.	Tot.
Labour Party	Ap	17,774	29.47%	2	0	2
Centre Party	Sp	12,668	21.00%	1	0	1
Progress Party	FrP	9,316	15.44%	1	0	1
Socialist Left Party	SV	5,511	9.14%	0	0	0
Christian Democratic Party	KrF	5,404	8.96%	0	0	0
Conservative Party	H	5,062	8.39%	0	0	0
Liberal Party	V	3,503	5.81%	0	1	1
Coastal Party	KP	495	0.82%	0	0	0
Red Electoral Alliance	RV	359	0.60%	0	0	0
Christian Unity Party	KSP	182	0.30%	0	0	0
Democrats		45	0.07%	0	0	0
Valid votes		60,319	100.00%	4	1	5
Blank votes		135	0.22%			
Rejected votes – other		66	0.11%			
Total polled		60,520	76.91%			
Registered electors		78,690				

The following candidates were elected:

- Constituency seats - Ingrid Heggø (Ap); Liv Signe Navarsete (Sp); Reidar Sandal (Ap); and Åge Starheim (FrP).
- Compensatory seat - Gunvald Ludvigsen (V).

===== 2001 =====
Results of the 2001 parliamentary election held on 9 and 10 September 2001:

Party		Votes	%	Seats		
Party		Votes	%	Con.	Com.	Tot.
Labour Party	Ap	13,453	22.44%	1	0	1
Centre Party	Sp	10,615	17.71%	1	0	1
Christian Democratic Party	KrF	9,743	16.25%	1	0	1
Conservative Party	H	7,660	12.78%	1	0	1
Socialist Left Party	SV	7,055	11.77%	1	0	1
Progress Party	FrP	5,989	9.99%	0	0	0
Liberal Party	V	3,230	5.39%	0	0	0
Coastal Party	KP	1,249	2.08%	0	0	0
The Political Party	DPP	404	0.67%	0	0	0
Red Electoral Alliance	RV	249	0.42%	0	0	0
Christian Unity Party	KSP	214	0.36%	0	0	0
Norwegian People's Party	NFP	50	0.08%	0	0	0
Fatherland Party	FLP	40	0.07%	0	0	0
Valid votes		59,951	100.00%	5	0	5
Rejected votes		267	0.44%			
Total polled		60,218	75.87%			
Registered electors		79,374				

The following candidates were elected:

- Constituency seats - Magne Aarøen (KrF); Sverre J. Hoddevik (H); Jorunn Ringstad (Sp); Heidi Grande Røys (SV); and Reidar Sandal (Ap).

==== 1990s ====
===== 1997 =====
Results of the 1997 parliamentary election held on 15 September 1997:

Party		Votes	%	Seats		
Party		Votes	%	Con.	Com.	Tot.
Labour Party	Ap	19,413	31.09%	2	0	2
Christian Democratic Party	KrF	11,640	18.64%	1	0	1
Centre Party	Sp	10,700	17.14%	1	0	1
Conservative Party	H	6,187	9.91%	1	0	1
Liberal Party	V	5,734	9.18%	0	0	0
Progress Party	FrP	4,868	7.80%	0	0	0
Socialist Left Party	SV	3,262	5.22%	0	0	0
Red Electoral Alliance	RV	396	0.63%	0	0	0
Fatherland Party	FLP	96	0.15%	0	0	0
Natural Law Party		60	0.10%	0	0	0
Green Party	MDG	49	0.08%	0	0	0
Communist Party of Norway	K	28	0.04%	0	0	0
Valid votes		62,433	100.00%	5	0	5
Rejected votes		147	0.23%			
Total polled		62,580	78.00%			
Registered electors		80,231				

The following candidates were elected:

- Constituency seats - Sverre J. Hoddevik (H); Lars Gunnar Lie (KrF); Astrid Marie Nistad (Ap); Kjell Opseth (Ap); and Jorunn Ringstad (Sp).

===== 1993 =====
Results of the 1993 parliamentary election held on 12 and 13 September 1993:

Party		Votes	%	Seats		
Party		Votes	%	Con.	Com.	Tot.
Labour Party	Ap	19,761	32.50%	2	0	2
Centre Party	Sp	17,536	28.84%	2	0	2
Christian Democratic Party	KrF	7,536	12.39%	1	0	1
Conservative Party	H	6,831	11.23%	0	0	0
Socialist Left Party	SV	4,817	7.92%	0	0	0
Liberal Party	V	2,490	4.10%	0	0	0
Progress Party	FrP	1,189	1.96%	0	0	0
Fatherland Party	FLP	277	0.46%	0	0	0
Red Electoral Alliance	RV	201	0.33%	0	0	0
New Future Coalition Party	SNF	167	0.27%	0	0	0
Valid votes		60,805	100.00%	5	0	5
Rejected votes		128	0.21%			
Total polled		60,933	75.83%			
Registered electors		80,357				

The following candidates were elected:

- Constituency seats - Håkon Steinar Giil (Sp); Lars Gunnar Lie (KrF); Astrid Marie Nistad (Ap); Kjell Opseth (Ap); and Jorunn Ringstad (Sp).

==== 1980s ====
===== 1989 =====
Results of the 1989 parliamentary election held on 10 and 11 September 1989:

Party		Votes	%	Seats		
Party		Votes	%	Con.	Com.	Tot.
Labour Party	Ap	20,324	31.44%	2	0	2
Centre Party	Sp	11,343	17.55%	1	0	1
Conservative Party	H	10,589	16.38%	1	0	1
Christian Democratic Party	KrF	9,509	14.71%	1	0	1
Socialist Left Party	SV	4,789	7.41%	0	0	0
Progress Party	FrP	4,185	6.47%	0	0	0
Liberal Party	V	3,391	5.25%	0	0	0
County Lists for Environment and Solidarity	FMS	483	0.75%	0	0	0
Free Elected Representatives		19	0.03%	0	0	0
Liberals-Europe Party		14	0.02%	0	0	0
Valid votes		64,646	100.00%	5	0	5
Rejected votes		116	0.18%			
Total polled		64,762	81.48%			
Registered electors		79,484				

The following candidates were elected:

- Constituency seats - Leiv Blakset (Sp); Dagfinn Hjertenes (H); Lars Gunnar Lie (KrF); Kjell Opseth (Ap); and Astrid Marie Nistad (Ap).

===== 1985 =====
Results of the 1985 parliamentary election held on 8 and 9 September 1985:

Party		Votes	%	Seats
Labour Party	Ap	23,577	36.95%	2
Conservative Party	H	14,135	22.15%	1
Centre Party	Sp	11,030	17.28%	1
Christian Democratic Party	KrF	8,460	13.26%	1
Liberal Party	V	2,903	4.55%	0
Socialist Left Party	SV	2,240	3.51%	0
Progress Party	FrP	937	1.47%	0
Red Electoral Alliance	RV	353	0.55%	0
Liberal People's Party	DLF	143	0.22%	0
Communist Party of Norway	K	35	0.05%	0
Valid votes		63,813	100.00%	5
Rejected votes		66	0.10%	
Total polled		63,879	81.32%	
Registered electors		78,551		

The following candidates were elected: Leiv Blakset (Sp); Lars Lefdal (H); Lars Gunnar Lie (KrF); Kjell Opseth (Ap); and Kåre Øvregard (Ap).

===== 1981 =====
Results of the 1981 parliamentary election held on 13 and 14 September 1981:

Party		Votes	%	Seats
Labour Party	Ap	18,914	31.00%	2
Conservative Party	H	16,279	26.68%	1
Christian Democratic Party	KrF	9,392	15.39%	1
Centre Party	Sp	8,568	14.04%	1
Liberal Party	V	3,755	6.15%	0
Socialist Left Party	SV	2,200	3.61%	0
Progress Party	FrP	1,090	1.79%	0
Red Electoral Alliance	RV	456	0.75%	0
Liberal People's Party	DLF	321	0.53%	0
Free Elected Representatives		26	0.04%	0
Plebiscite Party		17	0.03%	0
Valid votes		61,018	100.00%	5
Rejected votes		72	0.12%	
Total polled		61,090	79.29%	
Registered electors		77,050		

The following candidates were elected: Per J. Husabø (KrF); Lars Lefdal (H); Kjell Opseth (Ap); Kåre Øvregard (Ap); and Ambjørg Sælthun (Sp).

==== 1970s ====
===== 1977 =====
Results of the 1977 parliamentary election held on 11 and 12 September 1977:

Party		Votes	%	Seats
Labour Party	Ap	18,289	32.50%	2
Christian Democratic Party	KrF	11,428	20.31%	1
Conservative Party	H	10,503	18.66%	1
Centre Party	Sp	10,182	18.09%	1
Liberal Party	V	2,882	5.12%	0
Socialist Left Party	SV	1,263	2.24%	0
New People's Party	DNF	881	1.57%	0
Progress Party	FrP	467	0.83%	0
Red Electoral Alliance	RV	274	0.49%	0
Norwegian Democratic Party		50	0.09%	0
Single Person's Party		36	0.06%	0
Free Elected Representatives		20	0.04%	0
Valid votes		56,275	100.00%	5
Rejected votes		60	0.11%	
Total polled		56,335	79.95%	
Registered electors		70,460		

The following candidates were elected: Oddleif Fagerheim (Ap); Per J. Husabø (KrF); Lars Lefdal (H); Kåre Øvregard (Ap); and Ambjørg Sælthun (Sp).

===== 1973 =====
Results of the 1973 parliamentary election held on 9 and 10 September 1973:

Party		Votes	%	Seats
Labour Party	Ap	13,855	26.39%	2
Centre Party	Sp	12,052	22.96%	2
Christian Democratic Party	KrF	11,021	20.99%	1
Conservative Party	H	4,973	9.47%	0
Socialist Electoral League	SV	4,259	8.11%	0
Liberal Party	V	2,885	5.50%	0
New People's Party	DNF	1,935	3.69%	0
Anders Lange's Party	ALP	1,291	2.46%	0
Red Electoral Alliance	RV	115	0.22%	0
Single Person's Party		61	0.12%	0
Norwegian Democratic Party		54	0.10%	0
Valid votes		52,501	100.00%	5
Rejected votes		61	0.12%	
Total polled		52,562	77.10%	
Registered electors		68,171		

The following candidates were elected: John Austrheim (Sp); Oddleif Fagerheim (Ap); Sverre Johan Juvik (Ap); Knut Myrstad (KrF); and Ambjørg Sælthun (Sp).

==== 1960s ====
===== 1969 =====
Results of the 1969 parliamentary election held on 7 and 8 September 1969:

Party		Votes	%	Seats
Labour Party	Ap	17,824	33.64%	2
Christian Democratic Party	KrF	10,463	19.74%	1
Conservative Party	H	9,238	17.43%	1
Centre Party	Sp	8,919	16.83%	1
Liberal Party	V	5,971	11.27%	0
Socialist People's Party	SF	577	1.09%	0
Valid votes		52,992	100.00%	5
Rejected votes		103	0.19%	
Total polled		53,095	79.87%	
Registered electors		66,477		

The following candidates were elected: John Austrheim (Sp); Oddleif Fagerheim (Ap); Sverre Johan Juvik (Ap); Knut Myrstad (KrF); and Paul Svarstad (H).

===== 1965 =====
Results of the 1965 parliamentary election held on 12 and 13 September 1965:

Party		Votes	%	Seats
Labour Party	Ap	15,745	31.26%	1
Centre Party	Sp	10,283	20.42%	1
Liberal Party	V	8,008	15.90%	1
Conservative Party	H	7,722	15.33%	1
Christian Democratic Party	KrF	7,439	14.77%	1
Socialist People's Party	SF	1,169	2.32%	0
Valid votes		50,366	100.00%	5
Rejected votes		243	0.48%	
Total polled		50,609	79.46%	
Registered electors		63,692		

The following candidates were elected: John Austrheim (Sp); Ludvig Olai Botnen (V); Knut Myrstad (KrF); Einar Stavang (Ap); and Paul Svarstad (H).

===== 1961 =====
Results of the 1961 parliamentary election held on 11 September 1961:

Party		Votes	%	Seats
Labour Party	Ap	16,114	34.96%	2
Centre Party	Sp	9,554	20.73%	1
Liberal Party	V	7,258	15.75%	1
Christian Democratic Party	KrF	6,936	15.05%	1
Conservative Party	H	6,225	13.51%	0
Wild Votes		1	0.00%	0
Valid votes		46,088	100.00%	5
Rejected votes		276	0.60%	
Total polled		46,364	72.49%	
Registered electors		63,955		

The following candidates were elected: John Austrheim (Sp), 9,550 votes; Ludvig Olai Botnen (V), 7,257 votes; Hans Offerdal (Ap), 16,111 votes; Hans Karolus Ommedal (KrF), 6,936 votes; and Einar Stavang (Ap), 16,104 votes.

==== 1950s ====
===== 1957 =====
Results of the 1957 parliamentary election held on 7 October 1957:

Party		Votes	%	Seats
Labour Party	Ap	16,424	35.20%	2
Farmers' Party	Bp	10,096	21.64%	1
Liberal Party	V	7,912	16.96%	1
Christian Democratic Party	KrF	6,707	14.38%	1
Conservative Party	H	5,500	11.79%	0
Wild Votes		14	0.03%	0
Valid votes		46,653	100.00%	5
Rejected votes		272	0.58%	
Total polled		46,925	72.91%	
Registered electors		64,356		

The following candidates were elected: Anders Johanneson Bøyum (V); Per Severin Hjermann (Bp); Hans Offerdal (Ap); Hans Karolus Ommedal (KrF); and Einar Stavang (Ap).

===== 1953 =====
Results of the 1953 parliamentary election held on 12 October 1953:

Party		Votes	%	Seats
Labour Party	Ap	15,869	33.04%	2
Farmers' Party	Bp	9,822	20.45%	1
Liberal Party	V	8,609	17.92%	1
Christian Democratic Party	KrF	7,679	15.99%	1
Conservative Party	H	6,056	12.61%	0
Valid votes		48,035	100.00%	5
Rejected votes		284	0.59%	
Total polled		48,319	74.36%	
Registered electors		64,982		

The following candidates were elected: Anders Johanneson Bøyum (V); Per Severin Hjermann (Bp); Ivar Jacobsen Norevik (Ap); Hans Karolus Ommedal (KrF); and Einar Stavang (Ap).

==== 1940s ====
===== 1949 =====
Results of the 1949 parliamentary election held on 10 October 1949:

Party		Votes	%	Seats
Labour Party	Ap	16,362	32.50%	2
Liberal Party	V	15,128	30.05%	2
Farmers' Party	Bp	11,865	23.57%	1
Conservative Party	H	6,340	12.59%	0
Communist Party of Norway	K	472	0.94%	0
Society Party	Samfp	173	0.34%	0
Wild Votes		3	0.01%	0
Valid votes		50,343	100.00%	5
Rejected votes		326	0.64%	
Total polled		50,669	78.95%	
Registered electors		64,181		

The following candidates were elected: Anders Johanneson Bøyum (V); Jakob Mathias Antonson Lothe (V); Jens Lunde (Bp); Ivar Jacobsen Norevik (Ap); and Einar Stavang (Ap).

===== 1945 =====
Results of the 1945 parliamentary election held on 8 October 1945:

Party		Votes	%	Seats
Liberal Party	V	13,112	31.06%	2
Labour Party	Ap	12,689	30.06%	2
Farmers' Party	Bp	8,901	21.09%	1
Conservative Party	H	4,699	11.13%	0
Sogn og Fjordane Fishing and Smallholder Party		2,809	6.65%	0
Wild Votes		1	0.00%	0
Valid votes		42,211	100.00%	5
Rejected votes		280	0.66%	
Total polled		42,491	69.36%	
Registered electors		61,265		

The following candidates were elected: Anders Johanneson Bøyum (V); Jakob Mathias Antonson Lothe (V); Jens Lunde (Bp); Ivar Jacobsen Norevik (Ap); and Einar Stavang (Ap).

==== 1930s ====
===== 1936 =====
Results of the 1936 parliamentary election held on 19 October 1936:

Party		Party			List Alliance		
Party		Votes	%	Seats	Votes	%	Seats
Liberal Party	V	15,314	35.01%	2	15,314	35.03%	2
Farmers' Party	Bp	11,198	25.60%	1	17,379	39.75%	2
Conservative Party	H	6,198	14.17%	1	17,379	39.75%	2
Labour Party	Ap	10,141	23.18%	1	10,141	23.19%	1
Society Party	Samfp	760	1.74%	0	760	1.74%	0
Nasjonal Samling	NS	129	0.29%	0	129	0.30%	0
Valid votes		43,740	100.00%	5	43,723	100.00%	5
Rejected votes		174	0.40%				
Total polled		43,914	78.74%				
Registered electors		55,773					

As the list alliance was not entitled to more seats contesting as an alliance than it was contesting as individual parties, the distribution of seats was as party votes.

The following candidates were elected: Anders Ananias Andersen Hammerseth (H); Gjert Andreasson Hegrenæs (Bp); Anders A. Lothe (Ap); Jakob Mathias Antonson Lothe (V); and Hans Kristian Seip (V).

===== 1933 =====
Results of the 1933 parliamentary election held on 16 October 1933:

Party		Votes	%	Seats
Liberal Party	V	12,681	33.66%	2
Farmers' Party	Bp	11,104	29.48%	2
Labour Party	Ap	8,195	21.76%	1
Conservative Party	H	5,456	14.48%	0
Communist Party of Norway	K	233	0.62%	0
Valid votes		37,669	100.00%	5
Rejected votes		182	0.48%	
Total polled		37,851	69.07%	
Registered electors		54,804		

The following candidates were elected: Gjert Andreasson Hegrenæs (Bp); Peder Thorsen Hovland (Bp); Anders A. Lothe (Ap); Jakob Mathias Antonson Lothe (V); and Hans Kristian Seip (V).

===== 1930 =====
Results of the 1930 parliamentary election held on 20 October 1930:

Party		Votes	%	Seats
Liberal Party	V	13,568	35.56%	2
Farmers' Party	Bp	12,328	32.31%	2
Conservative Party	H	6,001	15.73%	1
Labour Party	Ap	5,956	15.61%	0
Communist Party of Norway	K	307	0.80%	0
Valid votes		38,160	100.00%	5
Rejected votes		156	0.41%	
Total polled		38,316	73.50%	
Registered electors		52,134		

The following candidates were elected: Gjert Andreasson Hegrenæs (Bp); Peder Thorsen Hovland (Bp); Jens Hermundson Kvale (V); Jakob Mathias Antonson Lothe (V); and Paul Johan Hansen Takle (H).

==== 1920s ====
===== 1927 =====
Results of the 1927 parliamentary election held on 17 October 1927:

Party		Votes	%	Seats
Liberal Party	V	11,709	38.73%	2
Farmers' Party	Bp	9,009	29.80%	2
Labour Party	Ap	5,614	18.57%	1
Conservative Party	H	3,558	11.77%	0
Communist Party of Norway	K	338	1.12%	0
Wild Votes		2	0.01%	0
Valid votes		30,230	100.00%	5
Rejected votes		284	0.93%	
Total polled		30,514	59.51%	
Registered electors		51,274		

The following candidates were elected: Gjert Andreasson Hegrenæs (Bp); Per Klingenberg Hestetun (V); Kristofer Indrehus (V); Anders A. Lothe (Ap); and Anfin Øen (Bp).

===== 1924 =====
Results of the 1924 parliamentary election held on 21 October 1924:

Party		Votes	%	Seats
Liberal Party	V	11,891	39.20%	3
Farmers' Party	Bp	7,082	23.35%	1
Conservative Party and Free-minded Liberal Party	H-FV	6,934	22.86%	1
Labour Party	Ap	2,079	6.85%	0
Nordfjord Venstre		1,578	5.20%	0
Communist Party of Norway	K	741	2.44%	0
Social Democratic Labour Party of Norway	S	30	0.10%	0
Wild Votes		1	0.00%	0
Valid votes		30,336	100.00%	5
Rejected votes		369	1.20%	
Total polled		30,705	61.55%	
Registered electors		49,886		

The following candidates were elected: Ingolf Elster Christensen (H-FV); Per Klingenberg Hestetun (V); Kristofer Indrehus (V); Jakob Mathias Antonson Lothe (V); and Anfin Øen (Bp).

===== 1921 =====
Results of the 1921 parliamentary election held on 24 October 1921:

Party		Votes	%	Seats
Liberal Party	V	11,912	40.40%	3
Conservative Party and Free-minded Liberal Party	H-FV	7,032	23.85%	1
Norwegian Farmers' Association	L	6,693	22.70%	1
Labour Party	Ap	2,781	9.43%	0
Radical People's Party	RF	1,025	3.48%	0
Wild Votes		45	0.15%	0
Valid votes		29,488	100.00%	5
Rejected votes		372	1.25%	
Total polled		29,860	61.42%	
Registered electors		48,614		

The following candidates were elected: Ingolf Elster Christensen (H-FV); Elias Faleide (V); Per Klingenberg Hestetun (V); Kristofer Indrehus (V); and Anfin Øen (L).
