= Dagfinn Hjertenes =

Norwegian politician (1943–2006)

Dagfinn Hjertenes (August 13, 1943, in Florø – February 28, 2006) was a Norwegian politician for the Conservative Party.

He was elected to the Norwegian Parliament from Sogn og Fjordane in 1989, and sat through one term.

Hjertenes was mayor of Flora Municipality from 1979 to 1985 and 1987 to 1989, and a council member from 1975 to 1979 and 1995 to 1997. He chaired the party chapter in Askøy Municipality from 1968 to 1972, and in Flora from 1990 to 1996. From 1990 to 1992 he was a member of the Conservative Party central board.
