= Stig Even Lillestøl =

Norwegian politician (born 1996)

Member of the Storting
- Incumbent
- Assumed office 1 October 2025
- Constituency: Sogn og Fjordane

Personal details
- Born: 27 August 1996 (age 29)
- Party: Progress Party

Stig Even Søvik Lillestøl (born 27 August 1996) is a Norwegian politician who was elected member of the Storting in 2025. He previously worked at iNyheter. In 2024 he was quoted as saying: "For me, it's the West first. We need to stick together and create a cultural and political alliance. In it, Trump, Viktor Orbán and Sylvi Listhaug are leading the way".
