= Per J. Husabø =

Norwegian politician

Per J. Husabø (6 May 1928 – 3 March 2012) was a Norwegian politician for the Christian Democratic Party.

Husabø was born in Leikanger Municipality. He was elected to the Norwegian Parliament from Sogn og Fjordane in 1977, and was re-elected on one occasion. He had previously served as a deputy representative during the term 1973–1977.

On the local level he was a member of the municipal council of Leikanger Municipality from 1967 to 1975. From 1975 to 1979 he was a deputy member of Sogn og Fjordane county council. He chaired the local party chapter from 1974 to 1976. He died, aged 83, in his native Leikanger.
