= Marius Langballe Dalin =

Norwegian politician (born 1966)

Member of the Storting
- Incumbent
- Assumed office 2025
- Constituency: Sogn og Fjordane

Personal details
- Born: 1966 (age 59–60)
- Party: Green

Marius Langballe Dalin (born 1966) is a Norwegian politician from the Green Party (MDG). He was elected to the Storting in the 2025 Norwegian parliamentary election.

Dalin is a physician by profession. He worked during the COVID-19 pandemic.

== See also ==
- List of members of the Storting, 2025–2029
