= Olav L. Os =

Norwegian politician

Olav Larsson Os (5 January 1882 – 19 March 1953) was a Norwegian politician for the Agrarian Party.

He hailed from Nordfjordeid, and made a career in silver fox breeding. He chaired the Norwegian Silver Fox Breeders' Association (now: the Norwegian Fur Breeders' Association) and several other organizations in his field. He was a board member of Nordfjord Hospital and served as mayor of Eid Municipality from 1935 to 1952 and in 1947.

He was elected as a deputy representative to the Parliament of Norway in 1927, 1930, 1933, 1936 and 1945. During the first term, 1928–1930, he moved up as a regular representative following the death of Anfin Øen.
