= Knut Myrstad =

Norwegian politician

Knut Myrstad (2 December 1913 – 27 May 2001) was a Norwegian politician for the Christian Democratic Party.

He was born in Selje Municipality.

He was elected to the Norwegian Parliament from Sogn og Fjordane in 1965, and was re-elected on two occasions.
