= Ivar Jacobsen Norevik =

Norwegian politician

Ivar Jacobsen Norevik (26 March 1900 – 18 March 1956) was a Norwegian politician for the Labour Party.

He was born in Lavik og Brekke Municipality. He was elected to the Norwegian Parliament from Nordre Bergenhus in 1945, and was re-elected on two occasions. Midway through the third term, he died and was replaced by Edvard Anderson Solheim.

Norevik was a deputy member of the municipal council for Kyrkjebø Municipality in the period 1937–1940.
