= Per Klingenberg Hestetun =

Norwegian politician (1877–1928)

Per Klingenberg Hestetun (11 August 1877 – 11 September 1928) was a Norwegian farmer and politician for the Liberal Party.

He was born at Hestetun in Øvre Årdal as a son of farmers Ola T. Hestetun (1843–1929) and Barbra P. Klingenberg (1841–1902). He attended primary school, and later Sogndal Folk High School in 1892–1893 and 1896–1897. From 1901 he took over the family farm.

He served as mayor of Årdal Municipality from 1908 to 1920 and 1923 to 1926. He took the initiative to establishing the local savings bank Årdal Sparebank in 1907. He was a board member here from 1912 to 1926.

He served as a deputy representative to the Parliament of Norway during the term 1919–1921, as the running mate of Sjur Torleifsen Næss, and was elected as a regular representative from Sogn og Fjordane in 1921, 1924 and 1927. He served until his death in September 1928, sustained by a fall at his farm. As he was the second candidate on the ballot (Liberal won two seats), he was replaced by the third candidate Jakob Mathias Antonson Lothe.
