= Per Severin Hjermann =

Norwegian politician

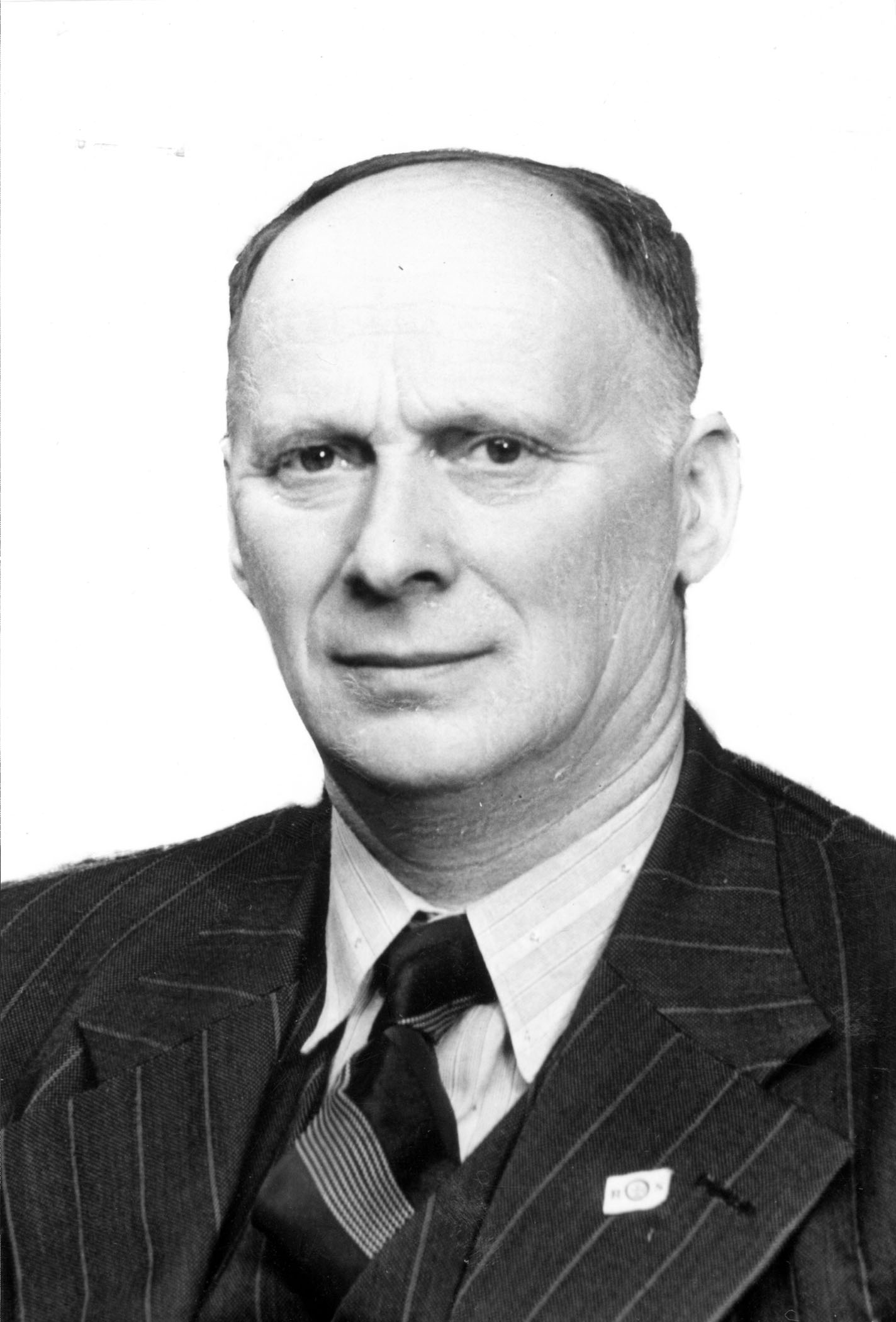
Per Severin Hjermann

Per Severin Hjermann (5 April 1891 – 13 June 1972) was a Norwegian politician for the Farmer's Party.

He was born in Lærdal Municipality. He was elected to the Norwegian Parliament from Sogn og Fjordane in 1954, and was re-elected on one occasion.

On the local level Hjermann held various positions on the municipal council of Lærdal Municipality from 1925 to 1955, and served as mayor from 1937 to 1953, interrupted by the German occupation of Norway from 1940 to 1945. He was also chairman of Sogn og Fjordane county council from 1945 to 1954.

Outside politics he was a farmer. He was involved in the Norwegian Agrarian Association, and chaired the Noregs elveeigarlag from 1948 to 1956.
