= Torbjørn Vereide =

Norwegian politician

Member of the Storting
- Incumbent
- Assumed office 1 October 2021
- Constituency: Sogn og Fjordane

Deputy Member of the Storting
- In office 1 October 2017 – 30 September 2021
- Constituency: Sogn og Fjordane

Personal details
- Born: 19 February 1989 (age 37)
- Party: Labour
- Occupation: Politician

Torbjørn Vereide (born 19 February 1989) is a Norwegian politician.

== Life and career ==
Vereide was born on 19 February 1989, and hails from Gloppen Municipality.

He was elected representative to the Storting from the constituency of Sogn og Fjordane in 2021, for the Labour Party. He was re-elected in 2025. He was deputy representative to the Storting 2017–2021.

In the Storting, he was a member of the Standing Committee on Labour and Social Affairs between 2021 and 2025. From 2025, he is a member of the Standing Committee on Energy and the Environment.
