= Einar Stavang =

Norwegian lawyer and politician (1898–1992)

Einar Magnus Henriksson Stavang (20 November 1898 – 3 May 1992) was a Norwegian lawyer and politician for the Labour Party.

He was born in Bru Municipality as a son of teacher Henrik Matias Stavang (1866–1965) and Jensine Margrete Salomonsdatter (1866–1938). In 1927 he married Marie Vinje Baugstø (1901–). Their sons Per and Mattis Stavang were both jurists.

Stavang was deputy mayor of Florø Municipality in the periods 1928–1930 and 1934–1934, and mayor in 1940 and 1945–1946. He moved to Førde in 1946. He was elected to the Parliament of Norway from Sogn og Fjordane in 1945, and was re-elected on five occasions.

Having graduated with a cand.jur. degree in 1924, Stavang worked as a journalist, teacher and bank director among others. He was an active participant in Noregs Mållag.
