= Sverre J. Hoddevik =

Norwegian politician (born 1946)

Sverre J. Hoddevik (born 10 June 1946, in Selje Municipality) is a Norwegian politician for the Conservative Party.

He was elected to the Norwegian Parliament from Sogn og Fjordane in 1997, and was re-elected once, in 2001. (The Norwegian Parliament serves in four-year, fixed, terms.)

Hoddevik was a member of the municipal council for Selje Municipality from 1983 to 1997, and he served as mayor from 1990.
