= Kristen Øyen =

Norwegian forester (born 1938)

Kristen Øyen (born 14 May 1938) is a Norwegian forester.

He was born in Jostedal Municipality, and graduated from the Norwegian College of Agriculture in 1964. From 1984 to 2001 he was the director of the Norwegian Institute of Land Inventory. In 2006 he released a work on the history of the Norwegian Institute of Land Inventory: Kartlegginga av Noregs grøne gull.
