= Jakob Mathias Antonson Lothe =

Norwegian politician

Personal details
- Born: 14 November 1881 Lote, Norway
- Died: 17 June 1975 (aged 93)
- Party: Liberal Party of Norway (Norwegian: Venstre)
- Education: Volda lærarhøgskule
- Occupation: Politician
- Profession: Teacher

Jakob Mathias Antonson Lothe (14 November 1881 – 17 June 1975) was a Norwegian politician for the Liberal Party.

He was born in Lote in Gloppen Municipality (now part of Stad Municipality) as a son of farmers Anton Jakobsen Lothe (1852–1932) and Anne Marie A. Røsæt (1853–1940).

He was a member of the municipal council of Gloppen Municipality between 1919 and 1928, except for a short period between 1923 and 1925. He was elected to the Norwegian Parliament from Sogn og Fjordane in 1925, and was re-elected on five occasions, with a spell as deputy representative during the term 1928–1930. However, he served most of that term as well, after regular representative Per Klingenberg Hestetun died.

Lothe was President of the Lagting, the former quasi-upper house of the parliament of Norway, from 1945–1954.
