= Bergen Prison =

Prison in Bergen, Norway

Coordinates: 60°30′0″N 5°22′19″E

Bergen Prison is located in the Bergen kommune in Vestland and is placed under the west Criminal Care department. The prison was opened in 1990 and has a capacity of 258 inmates.

Women and men serve together in Bergen prison, and there have been repeated revelations about female inmates prostituting themselves in exchange for drugs.
