= Norsk Havnestyreforbund =

Norwegian port authority association

Norsk Havnestyreforbund (Association of Port Authorities in Norway) was an association of local port authorities in Norway.

It was established by sixteen port authorities on 29 November 1918.It was dissolved on 21 April 1972. Its tasks was taken over by the ports subcommittee in the Norwegian Association of Local and Regional Authorities.
