= Jeremy Hawthorn =

British literary historian

Jeremy Miles Hawthorn (9 May 1942– 28 October 2025) was a British literary historian.

He was born in Beckenham. Having attended the University of Leeds, Hawthorn moved to Norway and was appointed as a professor of modern British literature at the University of Trondheim in 1981. With the university becoming a part of the Norwegian University of Science and Technology, Hawthorn remained professor until reaching the retirement age in 2012.

In 1975 he published a book on Virginia Woolf's Mrs Dalloway, subtitled A Study in Alienation. Books on Joseph Conrad include Joseph Conrad: Language and Fictional Self-Consciousness (1979, Edward Arnold), Joseph Conrad: Narrative Technique and Ideologial Commitment (1990, Continuum), Joseph Conrad: The Shadow-Line (ed., 1992, Oxford University Press), Sexuality and the Erotic in the Fiction of Joseph Conrad (2007, Continuum) and Joseph Conrad and Ford Madox Ford: The Inheritors, The Nature of a Crime (ed., 2022, Cambridge University Press). General works include A Glossary of Contemporary Literary Theory (2000), published in four editions, and Studying the Novel (1985), published in eight edititions, last in 2023. He was inducted into the Norwegian Academy of Science and Letters in 2006. He died in October 2025, aged 83.
