= Jostedal Church =

Church in Vestland, Norway

- Jostedal kyrkje
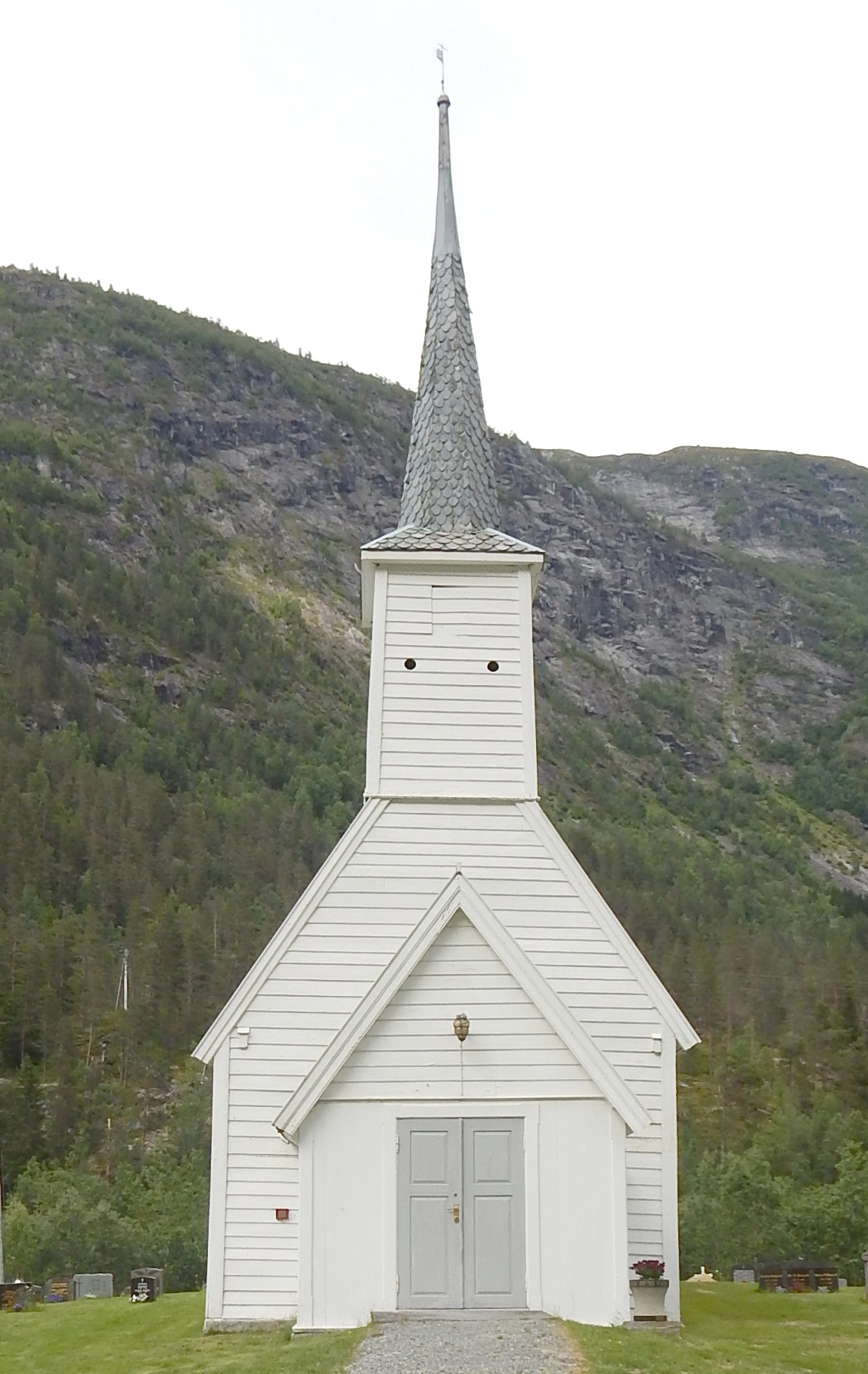
- View of the church
- Jostedal Church
- 61°35′15″N 7°17′01″E
- Location: Luster Municipality, Vestland
- Country: Norway
- Denomination: Church of Norway
- Churchmanship: Evangelical Lutheran

History
- Status: Parish church
- Founded: 13th century
- Consecrated: c. 1660

Architecture
- Functional status: Active
- Architectural type: Long church
- Completed: c. 1660 (366 years ago)

Specifications
- Capacity: 120
- Materials: Wood

Administration
- Diocese: Bjørgvin bispedømme
- Deanery: Sogn prosti
- Parish: Jostedal
- Norwegian Cultural Heritage Site
- Type: Church
- Status: Automatically protected
- ID: 84744

Jostedal Church (Norwegian: Jostedal kyrkje) is a parish church of the Church of Norway in Luster Municipality in Vestland county, Norway. It is located in the village of Jostedal. It is the church for the Jostedal parish which is part of the Sogn prosti (deanery) in the Diocese of Bjørgvin. The white, wooden church was built in a long church design around 1660 by builder Hans Ottesen Ravn using plans drawn up by an unknown architect. The church seats about 120 people.

== History ==
The earliest existing historical records of the church date back to the year 1322, but the church was not new that year. The first church was a wooden stave church that was likely built in the 13th century. The whole Jostedalen area became virtually uninhabited after the Black Death in Norway, so the wooden church must have sat vacant for some time. Tradition states that the church was unused from the mid-1300s until the mid-1500s and throughout that time it was not maintained. Eventually more people moved back to the valley and in 1533, the old church was torn down and replaced with a new stave church. That stave church fell into disrepair rather quickly and it was torn down in 1660.

After the old church was demolished, a small, timber-framed long church was built on the same site. Some of the materials from the previous building were reused in the new building. The new building was 12 metres (39 ft) long and 11 metres (36 ft) tall and it was built by Hans Ottesen Ravn who was the son of the priest. In 1680, there was a snow avalanche that hit the building and the tower was damaged. During the 1700s, the church was successively expanded and rebuilt. The area that once was the choir was incorporated into the nave and a new choir was added to the east of the existing building. On the west end of the church, a new church porch was built at that time as well.

In 1814, this church served as an election church (Norwegian: valgkirke). Together with more than 300 other parish churches across Norway, it was a polling station for elections to the 1814 Norwegian Constituent Assembly which wrote the Constitution of Norway. This was Norway's first national elections. Each church parish was a constituency that elected people called "electors" who later met together in each county to elect the representatives for the assembly that was to meet at Eidsvoll Manor later that year.

In 1907–1910, the church was extensively renovated by architect Johannes Kløften. During this renovation, the church porch was rebuilt and the choir was enlarged. In 1960, the old floor was removed and a new floor was laid. In the 1990s, the ceiling of the nave was opened up and insulation was added.

== Media gallery ==
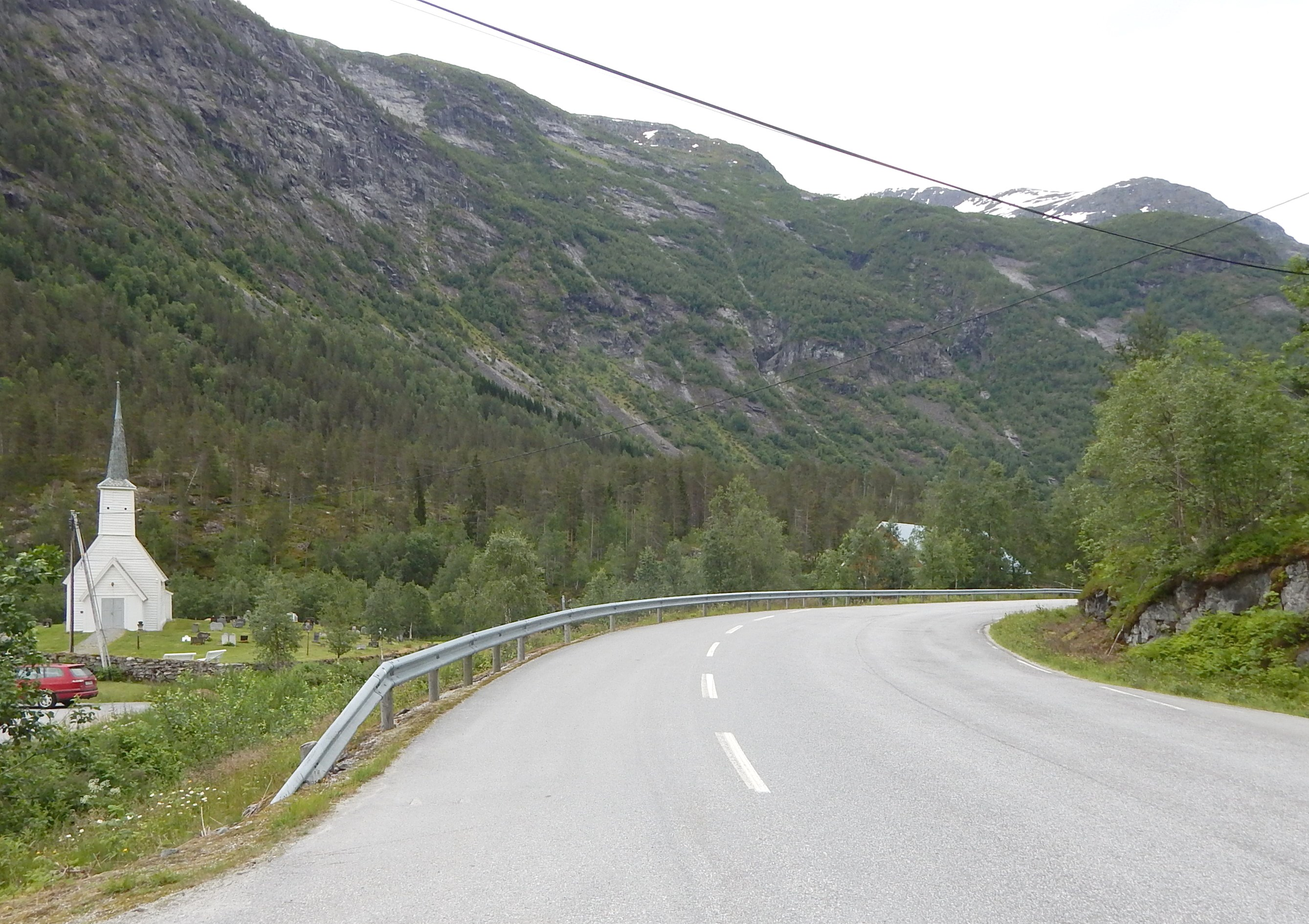

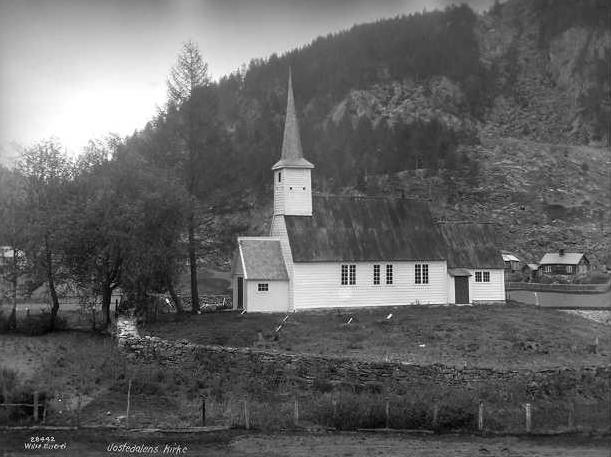

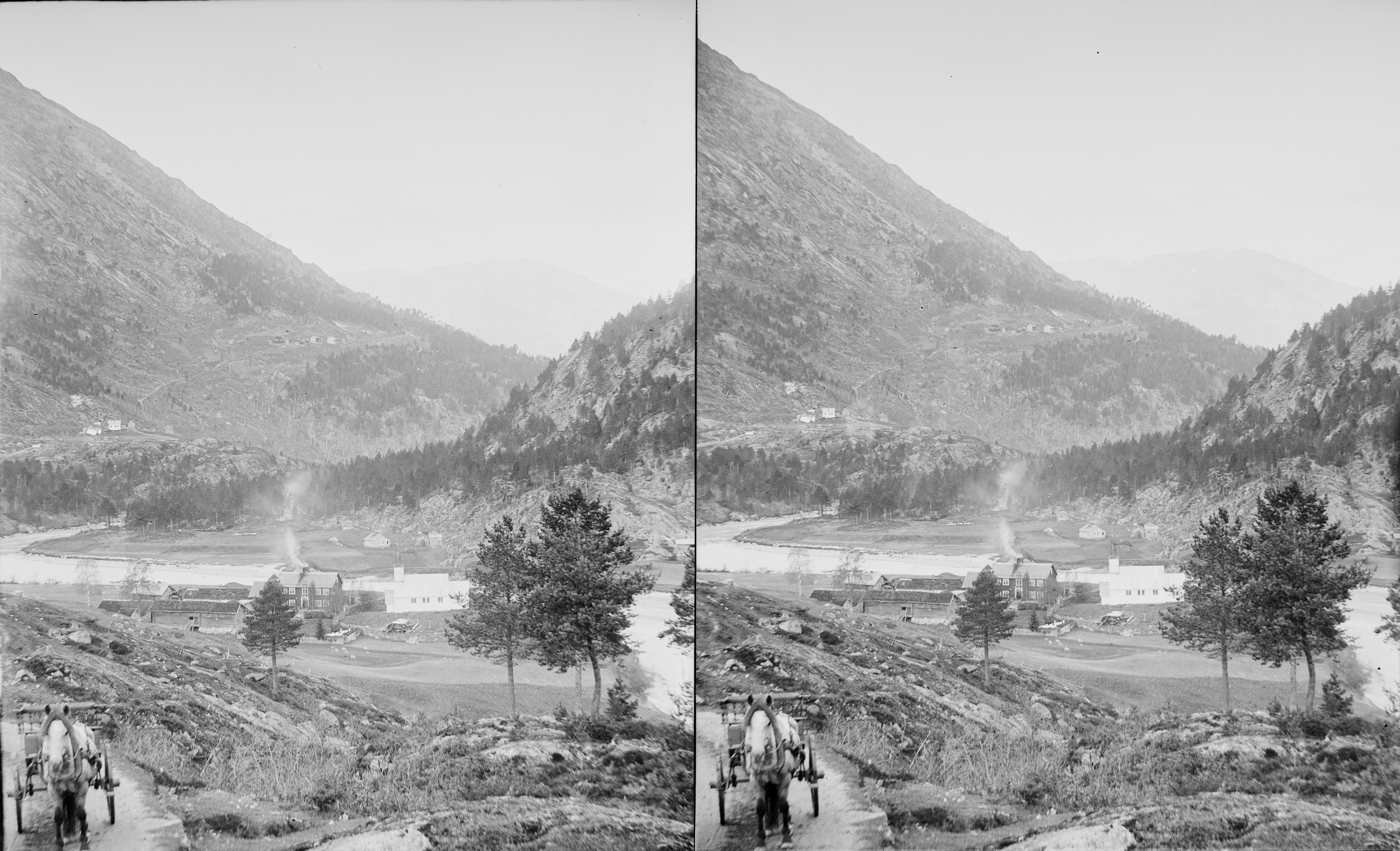

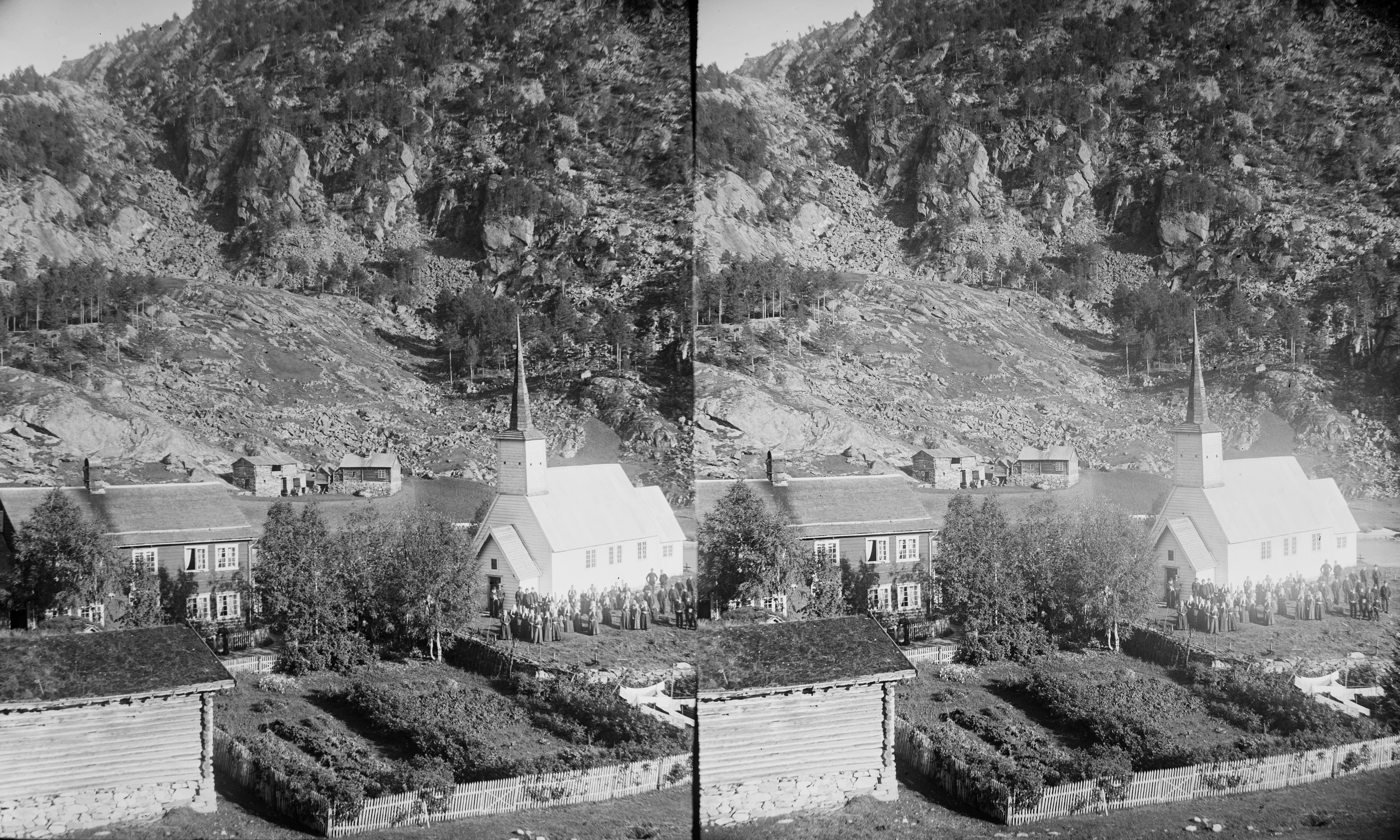

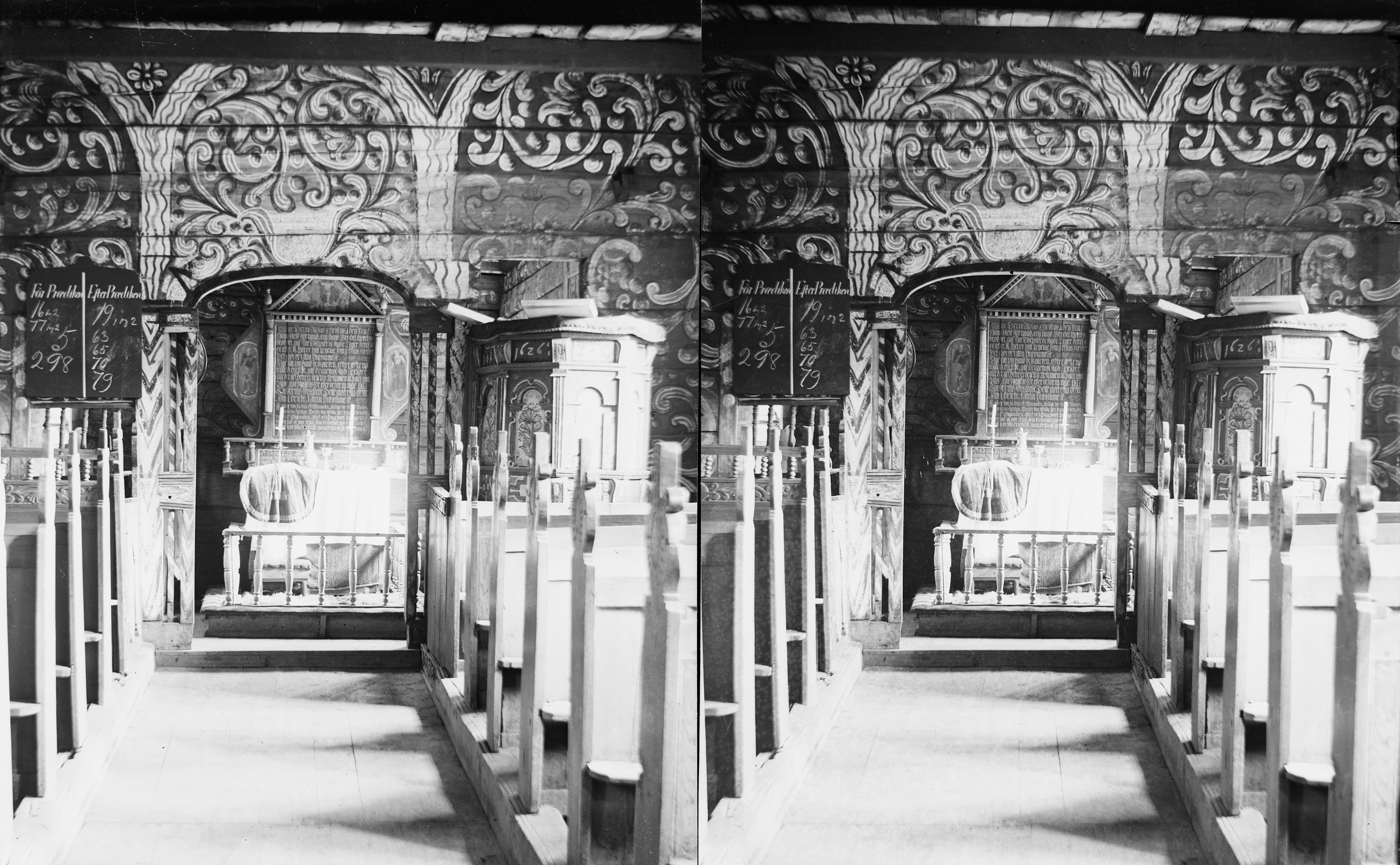

== See also ==
- List of churches in Bjørgvin
