= Lote, Norway =

Village in Stad Municipality, Norway

Lote
- Village
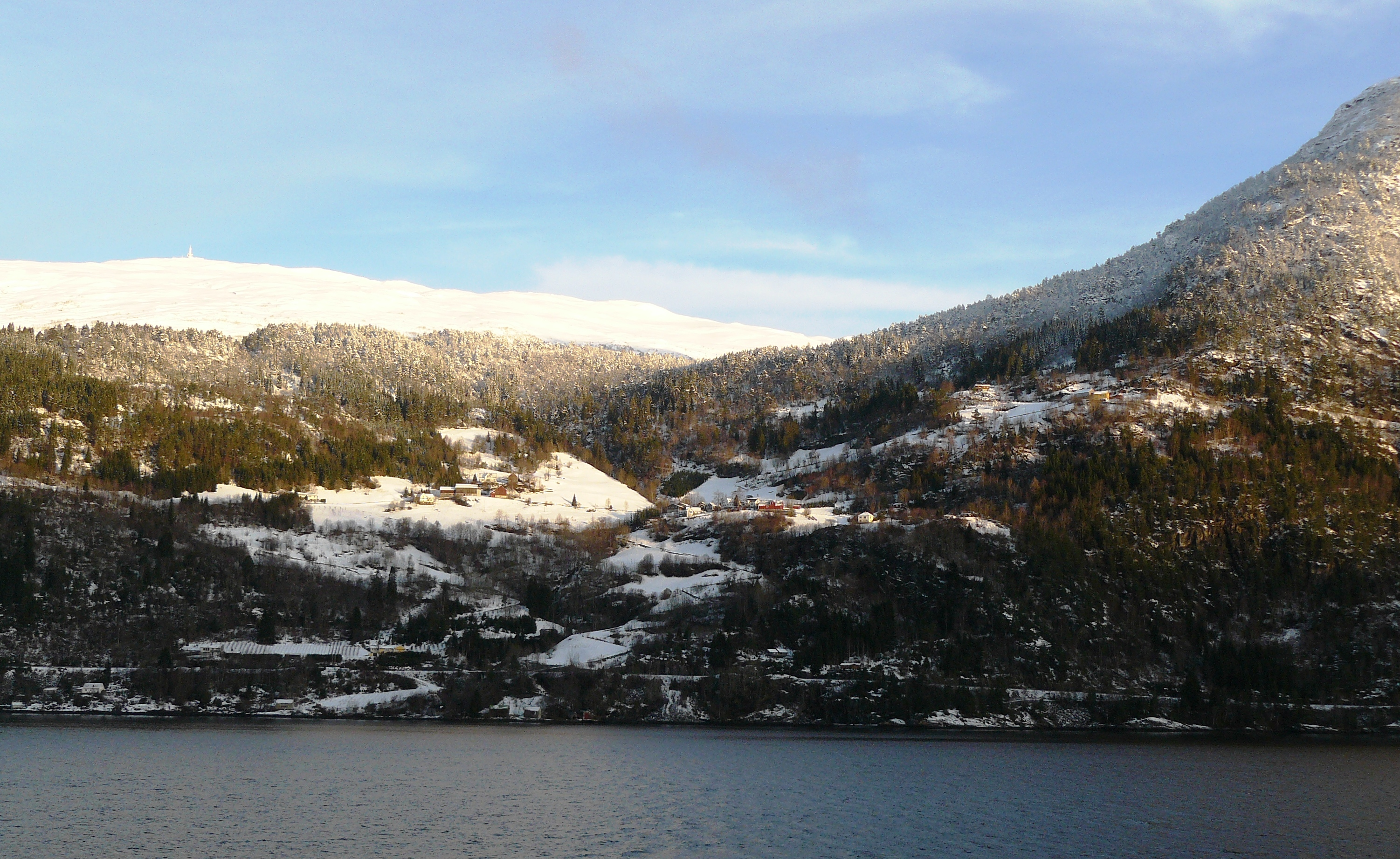
- View of the village
- Interactive map of Lote
- Location within Vestland Location within Norway
- Coordinates: 61.8681°N 6.0752°E
- Country: Norway
- Region: Western Norway
- County: Vestland
- District: Nordfjord
- Municipality: Stad Municipality
- Elevation: 12 m (39 ft)

Population (2001)
  - Total: 132
- Time zone: UTC+01:00 (CET)
  - Summer (DST): UTC+02:00 (CEST)
- Post Code: 6778 Lote

Lote is a village in Stad Municipality in Vestland county, Norway. The population of Lote (2001) was 132. The village is located about 8 kilometres (5.0 mi) southeast of the village of Nordfjordeid and about 13 kilometres (8.1 mi) northwest of the village of Sandane in Gloppen Municipality. The 2.9-kilometre (1.8 mi) Lote Tunnel is a tunnel along the European route E39 that goes through a mountain north of Lote. The tunnel connects Lote with the rest of Stad Municipality.

== History ==
Starting in 1838, Lote was administratively a part of Gloppen Municipality, despite being separated from the rest of Gloppen by the Nordfjorden. On 1 January 1992, the Lote area was transferred to Eid Municipality. At that time Lote had 158 inhabitants. Then in 2020, it became part of Stad Municipality. Lote is still connected to Gloppen Municipality by a car ferry.

== Transportation ==
The European route E39 highway passes through the village of Lote as it travels north toward Nordfjordeid. Going south from Lote on E39, there is a ferry service which crosses the Nordfjorden. After crossing over the Nordfjorden south of Lote, the Sandane Airport, Anda is located 2.5 kilometres (1.6 mi) away also along the E39 highway.
