= List of members of the Storting, 2013–2017 =

Distribution of mandates after the 2013 election Socialist Left Party (7) Labour Party (55) Centre Party (10) Green Party (1) Liberal Party (9) Christian Democratic Party (10) Conservative Party (48) Progress Party (29)

Between 9 October 2013 and 30 September 2017, the Parliament of Norway consisted of 169 members from 8 parties and 19 constituencies, elected during the 2013 Norwegian parliamentary election on 8 and 9 September. The center-right block received a majority of the seats, with the two largest right-wing parties, the Conservative Party (48 members) and the Progress Party (29 members) forming the minority Solberg's Cabinet. The cabinet had parliamentary support from the Christian Democratic Party (10 members) and the Liberal Party (9 members). The opposition consisted of the Labour Party (55 members), the Centre Party (10 members), the Socialist Left Party (7 members) and the Green Party (1 member).

Members of the Parliament of Norway are elected based on party-list proportional representation in plural member constituencies. The representatives from different political parties were elected from 19 constituencies, which are identical to the 19 counties. The electorate did not vote for individuals but rather for party lists, with a ranked list of candidates nominated by the party. This means that the person on top of the list would get the seat unless the voter alters the ballot. Parties could nominate candidates from outside their own constituency, and even Norwegian citizens currently living abroad.

The Sainte-Laguë method was used for allocating parliamentary seats to parties. As a result, the percentage of representatives was roughly equal to the nationwide percentage of votes. Conversely, if a party's initial representation in Parliament was proportionally less than its share of votes, the party might seat more representatives through leveling seats, provided that the nationwide percentage is above the election threshold, at 4 percent. Since 2005, nineteen seats in each parliament have been allocated via the leveling system.

If a representative was absent for whatever reason, their seat was filled by a candidate from the same party-list with no by-elections. Representatives who died during the term were replaced permanently, whereas representatives who were appointed to a government position, such as government minister (cabinet member) or state secretary, were replaced by a deputy representative until the representative no longer holds the government position. Deputy representatives also meet during typically short-term absence, like when a representative travels abroad with a parliamentary work group or is absent for health reasons.

== By county and party ==
The following is a breakdown of the intersection of parties and constituencies.

Constituency	Soc. Left	Labour	Centre	Green	Chr. Dem.	Liberal	Cons.	Progress	Total
Aust-Agder	0	1	0	0	1	0	1	1	4
Vest-Agder	0	2	0	0	1	0	1	2	6
Akershus	1	5	0	0	0	1	7	3	17
Buskerud	0	3	1	0	0	0	3	2	9
Finnmark	1	2	0	0	0	0	1	1	5
Hedmark	1	3	1	0	0	0	1	1	7
Hordaland	1	4	1	0	1	1	6	2	16
Møre og Romsdal	1	2	1	0	1	1	2	2	9
Nordland	0	4	1	0	0	0	2	2	9
Oppland	0	3	1	0	0	1	1	1	7
Oslo	1	6	0	1	1	2	6	2	19
Rogaland	0	3	1	0	2	1	4	3	14
Sogn og Fjordane	0	1	1	0	0	1	1	0	4
Telemark	0	3	0	0	1	0	1	1	6
Troms	1	3	0	0	0	0	1	2	7
Nord-Trøndelag	0	2	1	0	0	1	1	0	5
Sør-Trøndelag	1	4	1	0	0	0	2	2	10
Vestfold	0	2	0	0	1	0	2	2	7
Østfold	0	2	0	0	1	0	2	2	9
Total	7	55	10	1	10	9	48	29	169

== Representatives ==
The following is a list of members elected to the parliament in the 2013 election. It consists of the representative's name, party, and constituency, in addition to noting members assigned to government and deceased, with their regular deputy, chair and deputy chairs of standing committees, parliamentary leaders of the parties and representatives elected through a leveling seat.

When the Solberg's Cabinet was announced, nine representatives were given ministerial positions and a tenth representative is a state secretary. Deputies took their seats while the elected members are serving in the cabinet.

Name	Party	Constituency	Comments	Refs
Freddy de Ruiter	Labour	Aust-Agder		
Svein Harberg	Conservative	Aust-Agder		
Ingebjørg Godskesen	Progress	Aust-Agder		
Kjell Ingolf Ropstad	Christian Democratic	Aust-Agder	Leveling seat	
Ingunn Foss	Conservative	Vest-Agder		
Kari Henriksen	Labour	Vest-Agder		
Åse Michaelsen	Progress	Vest-Agder		
Hans Fredrik Grøvan	Christian Democratic	Vest-Agder		
Norunn Tveiten Benestad	Conservative	Vest-Agder		
Odd Omland	Labour	Vest-Agder	Leveling seat	
Jan Tore Sanner	Conservative	Akershus	Minister of Local Government and Modernisation in Solberg's Cabinet. Hårek Elvenes met in his place.	
Anniken Huitfeldt	Labour	Akershus	Chair of the Standing Committee on Foreign Affairs and Defence	
Kari Kjønaas Kjos	Progress	Akershus	Chair of the Standing Committee on Health and Care Services	
Sylvi Graham	Conservative	Akershus		
Sverre Myrli	Labour	Akershus		
Tone W. Trøen	Conservative	Akershus		
Marianne Aasen	Labour	Akershus		
Hans Andreas Limi	Progress	Akershus		
Bente Stein Mathisen	Conservative	Akershus		
Abid Raja	Liberal	Akershus		
Åsmund Grøver Aukrust	Labour	Akershus		
Henrik Asheim	Conservative	Akershus		
Ib Thomsen	Progress	Akershus		
Gunvor Eldegard	Labour	Akershus		
Nils Aage Jegstad	Conservative	Akershus		
Mette Tønder	Conservative	Akershus		
Bård Vegar Solhjell	Socialist Left	Akershus	Leveling seat	
Martin Kolberg	Labour	Buskerud	Chair of the Standing Committee on Scrutiny and Constitutional Affairs	
Trond Helleland	Conservative	Buskerud		
Jørund Rytman	Progress	Buskerud		
Lise Christoffersen	Labour	Buskerud		
Anders Bjørnsen Werp	Conservative	Buskerud		
Torgeir Micaelsen	Labour	Buskerud		
Morten Wold	Progress	Buskerud		
Kristin Ørmen Johnsen	Conservative	Buskerud		
Per Olaf Lundteigen	Centre	Buskerud	Leveling seat	
Helga Pedersen	Labour	Finnmark		
Frank Bakke Jensen	Conservative	Finnmark	Minister of European Affairs and Nordic Cooperation from 20 December 2016. Deputy Laila Davidsen met in his place.	
Kåre Simensen	Labour	Finnmark		
Jan-Henrik Fredriksen	Progress	Finnmark		
Kirsti Bergstø	Socialist Left	Finnmark	Leveling seat	
Knut Storberget	Labour	Hedmark		
Anette Trettebergstuen	Labour	Hedmark		
Gunnar Gundersen	Conservative	Hedmark		
Tor Andre Johnsen	Progress	Hedmark		
Tone Merete Sønsterud	Labour	Hedmark		
Trygve Slagsvold Vedum	Centre	Hedmark		
Karin Andersen	Socialist Left	Hedmark	Leveling seat	
Erna Solberg	Conservative	Hordaland	Prime Minister. Erik Skutle met in her place.	
Per Rune Henriksen	Labour	Hordaland		
Gjermund Hagesæter	Progress	Hordaland	State Secretary between June 2015 and December 2016. Laila Reiertsen met in his place.	
Øyvind Halleraker	Conservative	Hordaland		
Jette F. Christensen	Labour	Hordaland		
Peter Christian Frølich	Conservative	Hordaland		
Knut Arild Hareide	Christian Democratic	Hordaland		
Helge Andre Njåstad	Progress	Hordaland	Chair of the Standing Committee on Local Government and Public Administration	
Magne Rommetveit	Labour	Hordaland		
Torill Eidsheim	Conservative	Hordaland		
Terje Breivik	Liberal	Hordaland		
Ruth M. Grung	Labour	Hordaland		
Audun Lysbakken	Socialist Left	Hordaland		
Sigurd Hille	Conservative	Hordaland		
Kjersti Toppe	Centre	Hordaland		
Ove Bernt Trellevik	Conservative	Hordaland	Leveling seat	
Helge Orten	Conservative	Møre og Romsdal		
Else-May Botten	Labour	Møre og Romsdal		
Harald T. Nesvik	Progress	Møre og Romsdal		
Elisabeth Røbekk Nørve	Conservative	Møre og Romsdal		
Fredric Holen Bjørdal	Labour	Møre og Romsdal		
Oskar Jarle Grimstad	Progress	Møre og Romsdal		
Rigmor Andersen Eide	Christian Democratic	Møre og Romsdal		
Jenny Klinge	Centre	Møre og Romsdal		
Pål Farstad	Liberal	Møre og Romsdal	Leveling seat	
Lisbeth Berg-Hansen	Labour	Nordland		
Odd Henriksen	Conservative	Nordland		
Kenneth Svendsen	Progress	Nordland		
Eirik Sivertsen	Labour	Nordland		
Margunn Ebbesen	Conservative	Nordland		
Anna-Kristin Ljunggren	Labour	Nordland		
Jan Arild Ellingsen	Progress	Nordland		
Kjell-Idar Juvik	Labour	Nordland		
Janne Sjelmo Nordås	Centre	Nordland	Leveling seat	
Rigmor Aasrud	Labour	Oppland		
Tore Hagebakken	Labour	Oppland		
Olemic Thommessen	Conservative	Oppland	President of the Parliament	
Morten Ørsal Johansen	Progress	Oppland		
Anne Tingelstad Wøien	Centre	Oppland		
Stine Renate Håheim	Labour	Oppland		
Ketil Kjenseth	Liberal	Oppland	Leveling seat	
Jens Stoltenberg	Labour	Oslo	Granted leave to assume the position of Secretary General of NATO from 1 October 2014. Truls Wickholm met in his place.	
Ine Marie Eriksen Søreide	Conservative	Oslo	Minister of Defence in Solberg's Cabinet. Heidi Nordby Lunde met in her place.	
Hadia Tajik	Labour	Oslo	Chair of the Standing Committee on Justice	
Nikolai Astrup	Conservative	Oslo		
Siv Jensen	Progress	Oslo	Minister of Finance in Solberg's Cabinet. Mazyar Keshvari met in her place.	
Jonas Gahr Støre	Labour	Oslo		
Michael Tetzschner	Conservative	Oslo		
Trine Skei Grande	Liberal	Oslo		
Heikki Holmås	Socialist Left	Oslo		
Marianne Marthinsen	Labour	Oslo		
Kristin Vinje	Conservative	Oslo		
Rasmus Hansson	Green	Oslo		
Christian Tybring-Gjedde	Progress	Oslo		
Jan Bøhler	Labour	Oslo		
Mudassar Kapur	Conservative	Oslo		
Marit Nybakk	Labour	Oslo		
Ola Elvestuen	Liberal	Oslo	Chair of the Standing Committee on Energy and the Environment	
Stefan Magnus B. Heggelund	Conservative	Oslo		
Hans Olav Syversen	Christian Democratic	Oslo	Leveling seat, chair of the Standing Committee on Finance and Economic Affairs	
Bent Høie	Conservative	Rogaland	Minister of Health and Care Services in Solberg's Cabinet. Sveinung Stensland met in his place.	
Eirin Kristin Sund	Labour	Rogaland		
Solveig Horne	Progress	Rogaland	Minister of Children, Equality and Social Inclusion in Solberg's Cabinet. Helge Thorheim met in her place.	
Siri A. Meling	Conservative	Rogaland		
Olaug Vervik Bollestad	Christian Democratic	Rogaland		
Torstein Tvedt Solberg	Labour	Rogaland		
Bente Thorsen	Progress	Rogaland		
Arve Kambe	Conservative	Rogaland	Chair of the Standing Committee on Labour and Social Affairs	
Hege Haukeland Liadal	Labour	Rogaland		
Tina Bru	Conservative	Rogaland		
Roy Steffensen	Progress	Rogaland		
Geir Pollestad	Centre	Rogaland		
Geir Toskedal	Christian Democratic	Rogaland		
Iselin Nybø	Liberal	Rogaland	Leveling seat	
Ingrid Heggø	Labour	Sogn og Fjordane		
Liv Signe Navarsete	Centre	Sogn og Fjordane		
Bjørn Lødemel	Conservative	Sogn og Fjordane		
Sveinung Rotevatn	Liberal	Sogn og Fjordane	Leveling seat	
Terje Aasland	Labour	Telemark		
Torbjørn Røe Isaksen	Conservative	Telemark	Minister of Education and Research in Solberg's Cabinet. Solveig Sundbø Abrahamsen met in his place.	
Bård Hoksrud	Progress	Telemark	State secretary in the Ministry of Transport and Communications until June 2015. Kristian Norheim met in his place.	
Lene Vågslid	Labour	Telemark		
Christian Tynning Bjørnø	Labour	Telemark		
Geir Jørgen Bekkevold	Christian Democratic	Telemark	Leveling seat	
Martin Henriksen	Labour	Troms		
Elisabeth Aspaker	Conservative	Troms	Minister of Fisheries in Solberg's Cabinet until 16 December 2015, then of European Affairs until 20 December 2016. Regina Alexandrova met in her place.	
Øyvind Korsberg	Progress	Troms		
Tove Karoline Knutsen	Labour	Troms		
Kent Gudmundsen	Conservative	Troms		
Torgeir Knag Fylkesnes	Socialist Left	Troms	Leveling seat	
Ingvild Kjerkol	Labour	Nord-Trøndelag		
Arild Stokkan-Grande	Labour	Nord-Trøndelag		
Marit Arnstad	Centre	Nord-Trøndelag	Chair of the Standing Committee on Business and Industry	
Elin Rodum Agdestein	Conservative	Nord-Trøndelag		
André Nikolai Skjelstad	Liberal	Nord-Trøndelag	Leveling seat	
Trond Giske	Labour	Sør-Trøndelag	Chair of the Standing Committee on Education, Research and Church Affairs	
Linda Cathrine Hofstad Helleland	Conservative	Sør-Trøndelag	Chair of the Standing Committee on Transport and Communications until 2015. Minister of Culture from 16 December 2015, whence Torhild Aarbergsbotten met in her place.	
Eva Kristin Hansen	Labour	Sør-Trøndelag		
Per Sandberg	Progress	Sør-Trøndelag	Minister of Fisheries and Coastal Affairs from 16 December 2015. Lill Harriet Sandaune met in his place.	
Frank Josef Jenssen	Conservative	Sør Trøndelag		
Jorodd Asphjell	Labour	Sør-Trøndelag		
Karianne O. Tung	Labour	Sør-Trøndelag		
Heidi Greni	Centre	Sør-Trøndelag		
Sivert Haugen Bjørnstad	Progress	Sør-Trøndelag		
Snorre Valen	Socialist Left	Sør-Trøndelag	Leveling seat	
Svein Flåtten	Conservative	Vestfold		
Dag Terje Andersen	Labour	Vestfold		
Anders Anundsen	Progress	Vestfold	Minister of Justice and Public Security in Solberg's Cabinet until 20 December 2016. Tom Holthe met in his place.	
Karstein Eidem Løvaas	Conservative	Vestfold		
Sonja Mandt-Bartholsen	Labour	Vestfold		
Finn Morten Stordalen	Progress	Vestfold		
Anders Tyvand	Christian Democratic	Vestfold	Leveling seat	
Svein Roald Hansen	Labour	Østfold		
Ingjerd Schou	Conservative	Østfold		
Ulf Leirstein	Progress	Østfold		
Irene Johansen	Labour	Østfold		
Bengt Morten Wenstøb	Conservative	Østfold		
Stein Erik Lauvås	Labour	Østfold		
Erlend Wiborg	Progress	Østfold		
Eirik Milde	Conservative	Østfold		
Line Henriette Holten Hjemdal	Christian Democratic	Østfold	Leveling seat	
