= Anders Anundsen =

Norwegian politician

Anders Anundsen MP
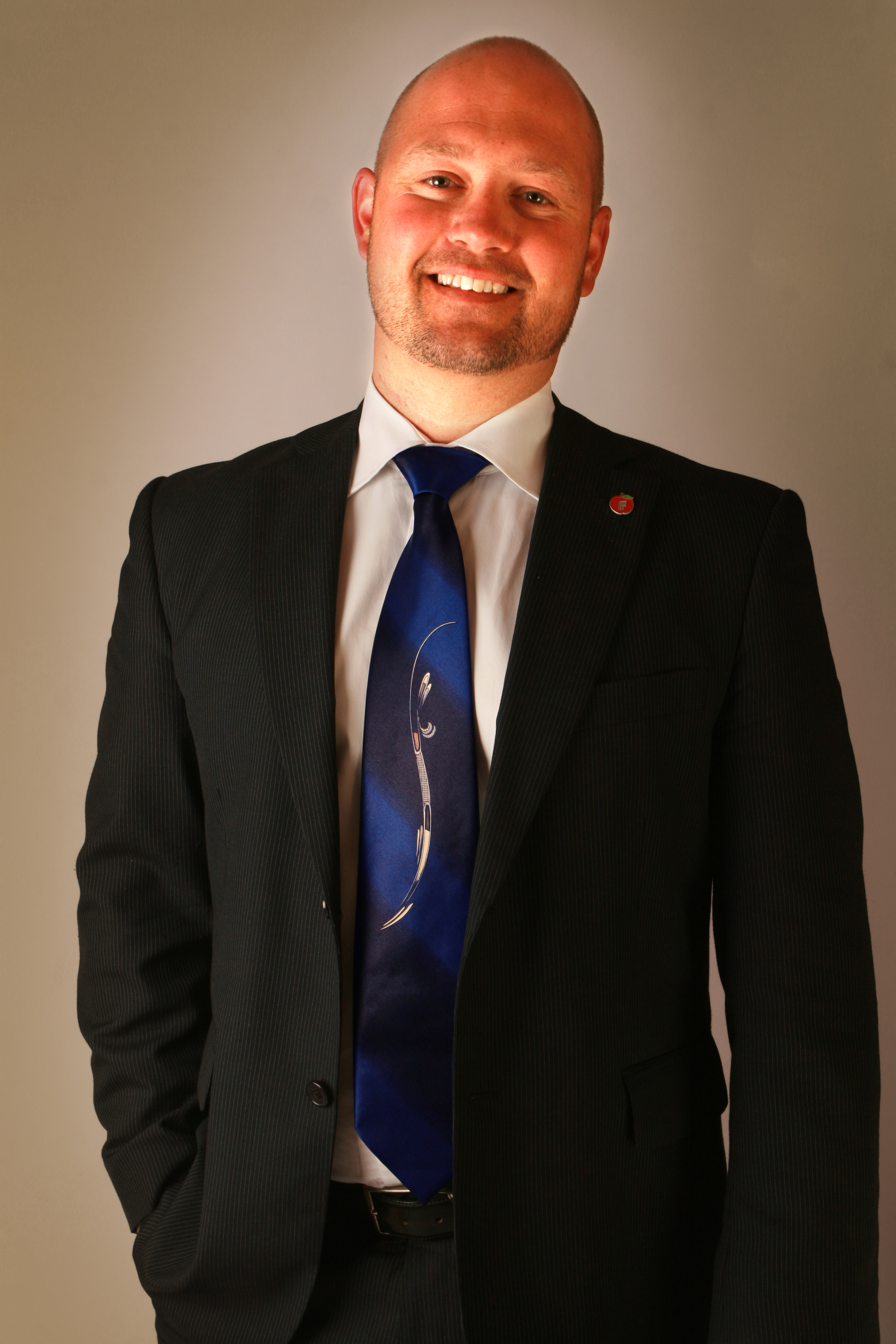

Minister of Justice
- In office 16 October 2013 – 20 December 2016
- Prime Minister: Erna Solberg
- Preceded by: Grete Faremo
- Succeeded by: Per-Willy Amundsen

Chair of the Standing Committee on Scrutiny and Constitutional Affairs
- In office 20 October 2009 – 30 September 2013
- First Deputy: Ola Borten Moe; Per Olaf Lundteigen
- Second Deputy: Martin Kolberg
- Preceded by: Lodve Solholm
- Succeeded by: Martin Kolberg

Second Vice Chair of the Preparatory Credentials Committee
- In office 1 October 2013 – 16 October 2013
- Leader: Marit Nybakk
- Preceded by: Elisabeth Aspaker
- Succeeded by: Ulf Leirstein (2017)

First Vice Chair of the Preparatory Credentials Committee
- In office 1 October 2009 – 30 September 2013
- Leader: Bendiks H. Arnesen
- Preceded by: Lodve Solholm
- Succeeded by: Sylvi Graham

Member of the Storting
- In office 1 October 2005 – 30 September 2017
- Deputy: Tom E. B. Holthe
- Constituency: Vestfold

Deputy Member of the Storting
- In office 1 October 1997 – 30 September 2001
- Constituency: Vestfold

Personal details
- Born: 17 November 1975 (age 50) Stavern, Vestfold, Norway
- Party: Progress
- Spouse: Marianne Ringnes
- Children: 3
- Education: University of Oslo (LL.M.)

Anders Anundsen (born 17 November 1975) is a Norwegian politician for the Progress Party who served as Minister of Justice from 2013 to 2016. He was also a member of the Norwegian parliament, representing Vestfold from 2005 to 2017.

A jurist by education, Anundsen rose to prominence for his work chairing the parliamentary Standing Committee on Scrutiny and Constitutional Affairs from 2009 to 2013, summoning several cabinet members to hearings, as well as committee work that concluded unanimously to criticise the government of Jens Stoltenberg for lack of emergency preparedness prior to the 2011 Norway attacks.

== Early life and education ==
Anders Anundsen was born in Stavern (now part of Larvik Municipality), Vestfold to senior financial advisor Arne Anundsen (born 1949) and assistant teacher Anne Gro Lysebo (born 1953). He studied law at Folkeuniversitetet from 1994 to 1995, and took minors in public law in 1998, and private law in 1999. In 2005 he finished the law profession study, and completed his Master of Laws from the University of Oslo in 2008.

== Political career ==
=== Early career and parliament ===
Anundsen was a member of the Vestfold county council from 1995 to 2007, and a member of the Larvik municipal council from 1999 to 2007. He has held numerous positions in the Progress Party, locally and in its youth organisation, and was chairman of the Progress Party's Youth in 1996, and from 1998 to 1999. He worked as political advisor and aide to the Progress Party parliamentary group from 1995 to 1997.

Anundsen was elected to the Norwegian parliament from Vestfold in 2005, while previously having served as a deputy representative from 1997 to 2001. He served as a delegate to the United Nations General Assembly from 2008 to 2013. From 2009 to 2013 he chaired the Standing Committee on Scrutiny and Constitutional Affairs. As chairman of the committee, Anundsen summoned several ministers of the Red–Green government to open hearings due to accusations of conflicts of interest, including Jonas Gahr Støre, Trond Giske and Audun Lysbakken (Lysbakken later resigned due to the case against him).

Following the 2011 Norway attacks, Anundsen was appointed second deputy leader of the 22 July Committee. In 2012, Jens Stoltenberg became the first ever incumbent Norwegian Prime Minister to be summoned to an open hearing, on the topic of the emergency preparedness of the government before the 2011 attacks. In 2013 the committee concluded unanimously to criticise the government for lack of preparedness before the attacks.

=== Minister of Justice ===
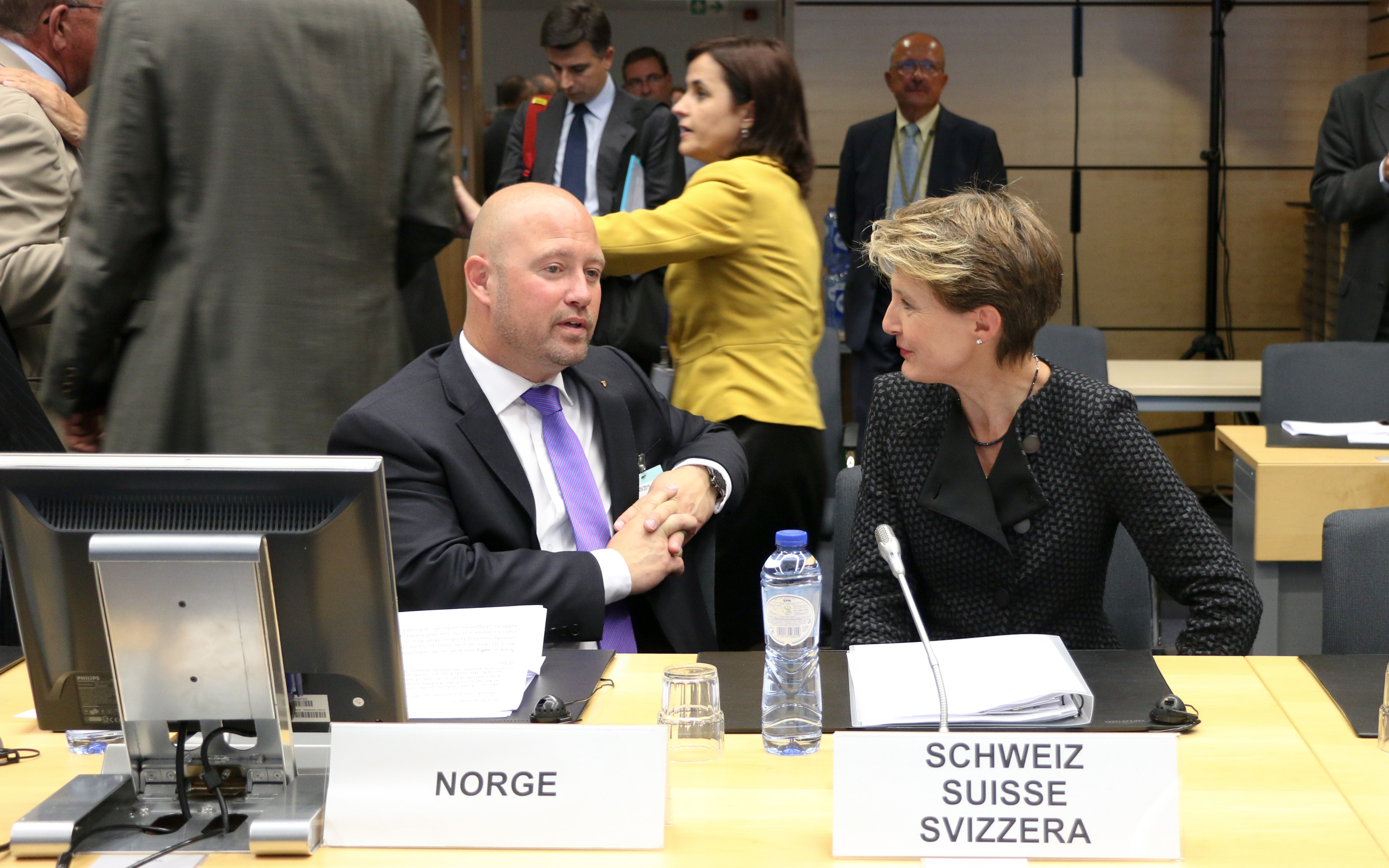
Minister Anundsen with Simonetta Sommaruga.

On 16 October 2013, Anundsen was appointed Minister of Justice in the new government of Erna Solberg. Having won much acclaim for his committee work in parliament, Anundsen was considered one of his party's strongest candidates for a cabinet position prior to the official appointment. During his time in government, his seat was covered by deputy member Tom E. B. Holthe.

During the last week of July 2014, Anundsen introduced extraordinary security measures due to a short-term high-risk terror threat reported by the Norwegian Police Security Service (PST), later revealed to have originated from a group of ISIL extremists from Syria. The measures introduced included full border controls and patrolling police across the country. In November the same year, Anundsen introduced temporary general arming of the Norwegian police due to a heightened terror risk. Although initially introduced for four weeks, the period was later extended to an additional two months due to continued high terror threat.

In order to alleviate a shortage of Norwegian prison spaces, Anudsen in 2014 signed a deal with the Netherlands to rent prison spaces in the country, with prisoners to be sent to the Netherlands during 2015. The deal would apply to prisoners with long-term sentences, and foreign citizens set to be deported from Norway.

In May 2015, following a motion of no confidence against him, Anundsen took self criticism for the case of shielding asylum children, further stating that it was wrong, and that the asylum children weren't going to be sent out of the country, but rather their priority had been downgraded.

In October 2015, Anundsen accepted to pay a fine after making a "boasting video" about himself at the expense of the state. The recording itself was also fined, but Anundsen didn't comment further on the matter.

In August 2016, Anundsen addressed digital assaults by stating that "we have been falling behind", and acknowledged that digital assaults can be an extreme challenge for police. He further added that "we should be one horse head in front of the assailants on this, but we are not".

During the summer of 2016, Anundsen had expressed that he didn't want to continue in government, reasoning private issues. He also told the Vestfold Progress Party in September that he wasn't seeking re-election to parliament in the next election. On 20 December 2016, he was succeeded by state secretary Per-Willy Amundsen in a cabinet reshuffle.

== Controversies ==
=== "Asylum children" case ===
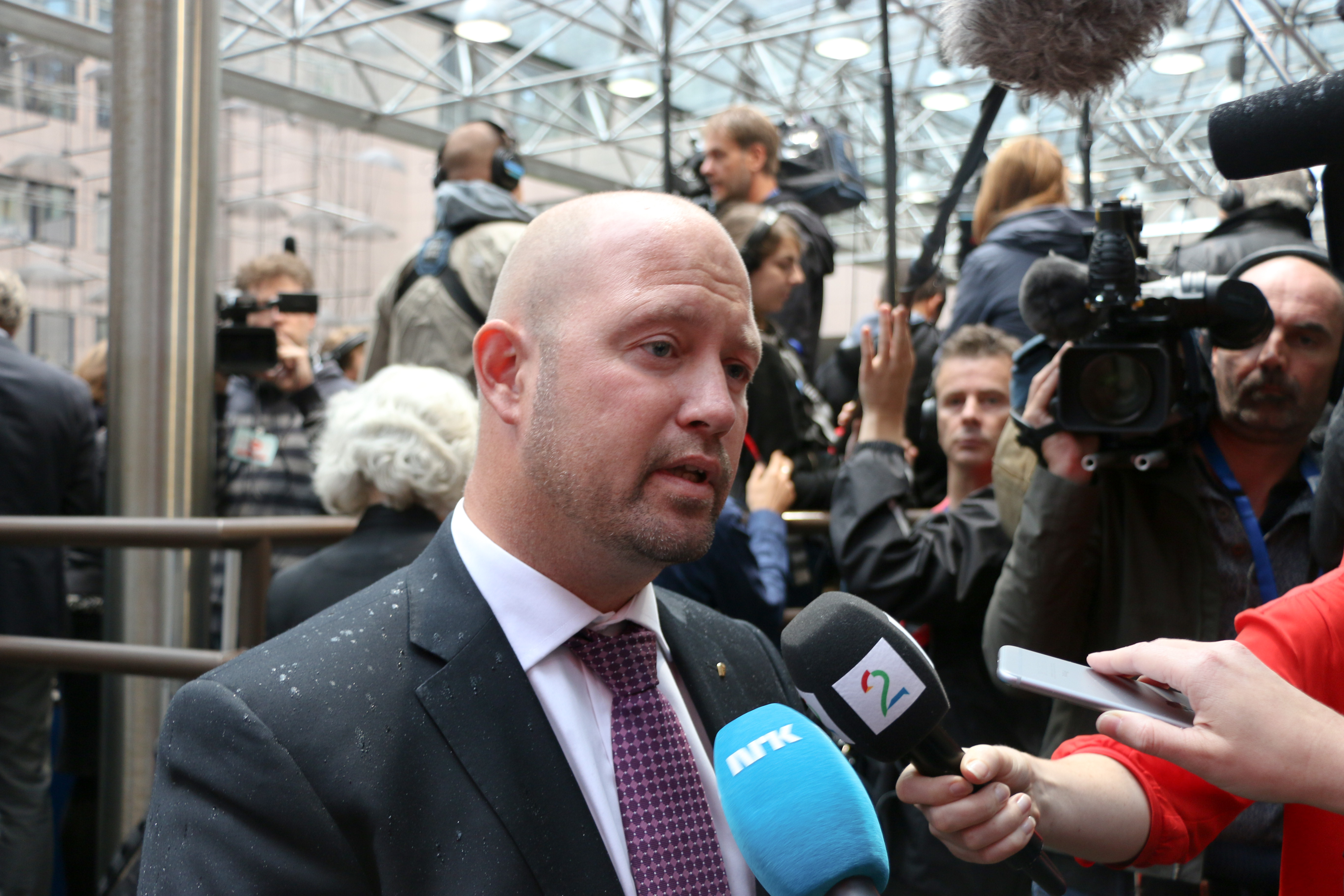

By late 2014 Anundsen became the subject of a controversy surrounding the deportation of so-called "long-term asylum children", children of asylum seekers who have had their application rejected, only to continue living in Norway illegally for several years. While the government's expressed policy has introduced measures to deport record numbers of illegal immigrants, it was revealed by Bergens Tidende that twice as many families had been sent out of Norway in 2014 than in 2013, despite that as part of the new government platform the Liberal and Christian Democratic parties had secured support for softening the rules on some long-term children, potentially allowing some to stay in Norway. As the cause was found to be that the new rules had not been communicated properly to the departments involved with deporting illegal immigrants, Anundsen in December apologised in parliament and took self-criticism for his handling of the case, saying he would signal the new rules better and go through routines.

In February 2015, Anundsen was summoned to an open hearing in the parliamentary Committee on Scrutiny and Constitutional Affairs after increasing pressure, following which the Labour, Socialist Left and Centre parties proposed a motion of no confidence against him. The Liberals and Christian Democrats however only supported issuing a strong criticism of Anundsen, and as such the motion failed to gain majority support. On 8 April, the four government-cooperation parties finally reached an agreement that would let some deported children have their asylum applications considered again under the new rules as a one-time solution, while in return some aspects of the general asylum policy would be further tightened. Anundsen went on to state that he had secured "a major tightening of immigration policy" by the agreement.

=== Criticism from Office of the Auditor General ===
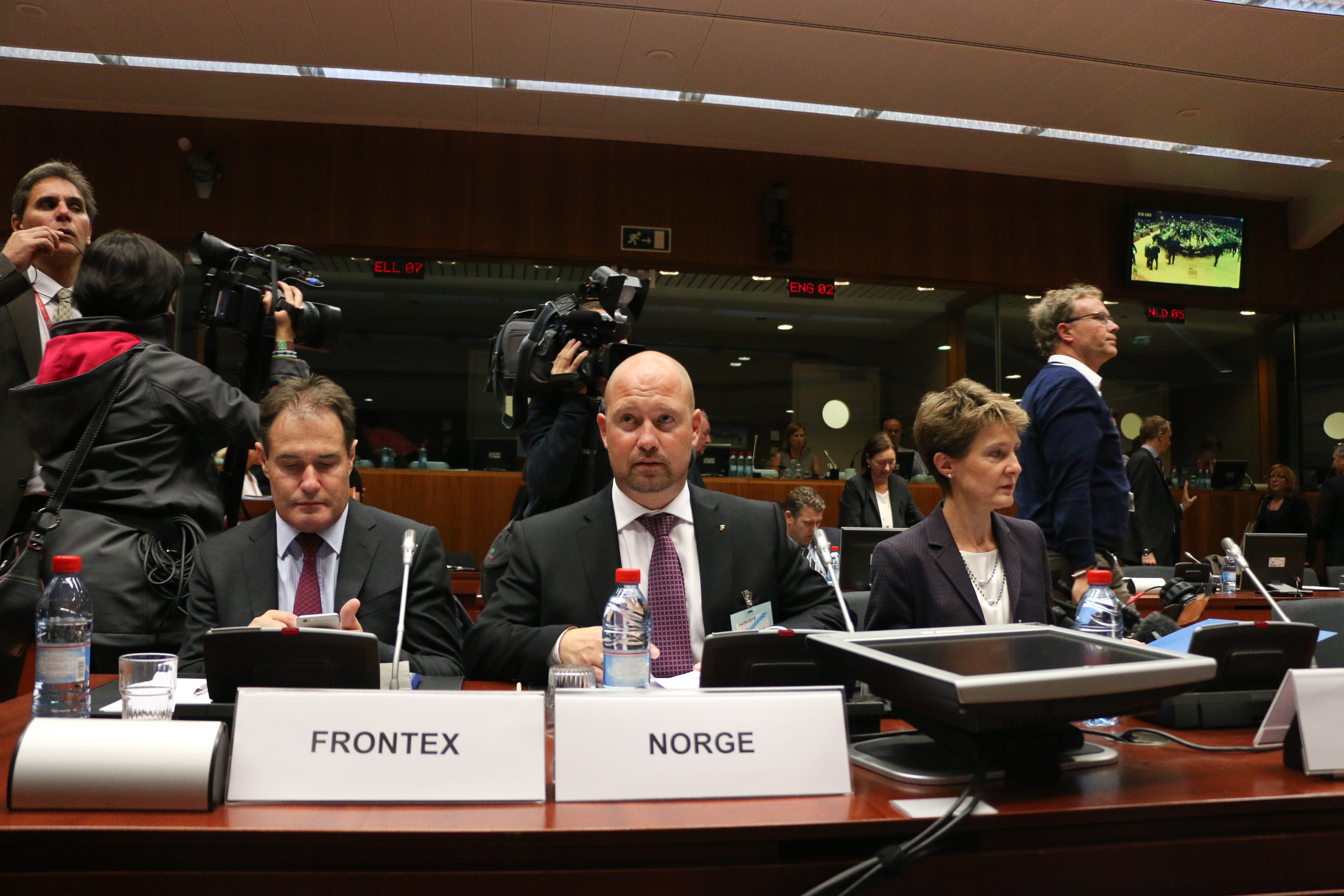

In March 2015, the Office of the Auditor General of Norway (Norwegian: Riksrevisjonen) criticized the Ministry of Justice and Public Security for the way the Ministry has coordinated the work with civil protection and prevention of future terror attacks. The criticism is a report revolving the coordination of the Directorate for Civil Protection and Emergency Planning and the county governors. The Auditor General of Norway, Per-Kristian Foss stated that he is personally disappointed over the fact that the government has not come any further in improving the civil protection, four years after the 2011 Norway attacks. He also proclaimed that the report is the toughest criticism from the Office of the Auditor General of Norway against a ministry since the Office of the Auditor General of Norway was established.

Anundsen responded to the criticism by saying that "This is serious criticism, but not against me personally. This is criticism against the work that has been done over many years". The director of the Directorate for Civil Protection and Emergency Planning, Jon Arvid Lea rejected the conclusions of the Office of the Auditor General, stating that it gave a wrong impression of the work and improvements that had been made in civil protection during recent years.

=== Cannabis statements ===
In an episode about cannabis in the series Folkeopplysningen, Anundsen stated that he had scientific research that proved that cannabis is more dangerous than alcohol. It turned out that the research he was based on either wasn't scientific research, or research that did not compare cannabis with alcohol.

== Personal life ==
Anundsen is married to Marianne Ringnes, and together they have three children.

Party political offices
Preceded by Klaus Jacobsen	Chairman of the Progress Party's Youth; 1996	Succeeded by Reidar Helliesen
Preceded by Reidar Helliesen	Chairman of the Progress Party's Youth; 1998–1999	Succeeded by Bård André Hoksrud
Political offices
Preceded by Grete Faremo	Minister of Justice and Public Security; 2013–2016	Succeeded by Per-Willy Amundsen
