= Erlend Wiborg =

Norwegian politician

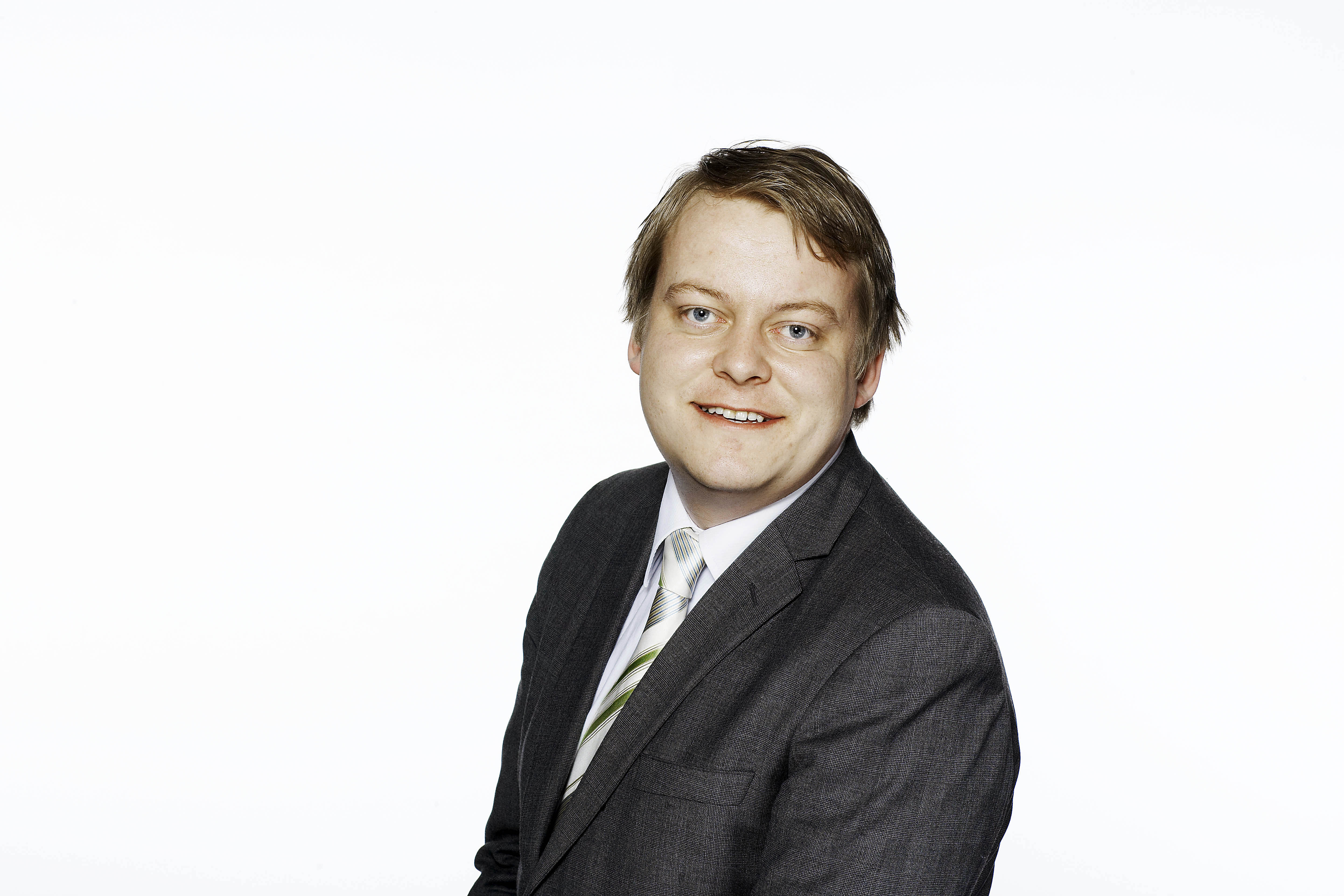

Member of the Storting
- Incumbent
- Assumed office 1 October 2013
- Constituency: Østfold

Chair of the Standing Committee on Labour and Social Affairs
- In office 17 October 2017 – 30 September 2021
- First Deputy: Hadia Tajik; Rigmor Aasrud
- Second Deputy: Heidi Nordby Lunde
- Preceded by: Arve Kambe
- Succeeded by: Kirsti Bergstø

First Vice Chair of the Standing Committee on Labour and Social Affairs
- In office 22 October 2013 – 30 September 2017
- Leader: Arve Kambe
- Preceded by: Karin Andersen
- Succeeded by: Hadia Tajik

Deputy Member of the Storting
- In office 1 October 2005 – 30 September 2013
- Constituency: Østfold

Personal details
- Born: 20 January 1984 (age 42) Sarpsborg, Østfold, Norway
- Party: Progress

Erlend Wiborg (born 20 January 1984) is a Norwegian politician for the Progress Party. He served as deputy mayor of Moss from 2011 to 2013, when he was elected as an MP for Østfold. He has previously served as deputy MP from 2005 to 2013. In parliament, Wiborg served as the first vice chair of the Standing Committee on Labour and Social Affairs from 2013 to 2017, before chairing the committee until 2021.

== Political career ==
=== Local politics ===
He has been a member of the Moss municipal council and the Østfold county council from 2003 to 2011. He also served as deputy mayor of Moss from 2011 to 2013.

In March 2013, he notably said that the Sami flag should not be raised during Constitution Day celebrations, and that only the Norwegian flag should. He did however acknowledge that the Sami flag should be raised on other occasions. He was criticized by the President of the Sami Parliament, Egil Olli, who said the Wiborg fell in the line of "Progress Party politicians who do not understand Norwegian history. It does not come as a surprise that they don't own any knowledge". Olli further called Wiborg's proposal "historyless".

=== Parliament ===
Wiborg was elected to the Norwegian parliament from Østfold in 2013, and previously served as a deputy representative from 2005 to 2013. He served as the first deputy chair of the Standing Committee on Labour and Social Affairs from 2013 to 2017 and chair of the same committee from 2017 to 2021.

Wiborg joined the pro-Israel organisation With Israel for Peace in 2014.

In March 2019, he expressed that the Storting should display the Norwegian flag in the Storting chamber, further saying he would act further upon the matter. He is said to have drawn inspiration from other national parliaments that flag their flags in their respective chambers, notably recently Denmark, who started this practise in 2017. President of the Storting Tone Wilhelmsen Trøen said that the matter would be treated normally by the Storting presidency.

In early December 2019, he expressed that NATO should be given the Nobel Peace Prize, given that their main goal is to work to secure peace. He acknowledged that despite that NATO has gone to war before, he deemed it a necessity, and further expressed understanding that his NATO nomination could be a controversial choice.

In September 2020, during the COVID-19 pandemic in Norway, he expressed expectations that both parts in the then ongoing bus strike to end the strike. He also criticized the strike, saying it was irresponsible to strike in the midst of the pandemic.

On 9 April 2021, the 81st anniversary of the German occupation of Norway, he supported Conservative MP Lene Westgaard-Halle in her criticism of former Swedish prime minister Carl Bildt's tweet that Swedish defence forces were stronger than those of Norway and Denmark. Wiborg drew parallels to criticism once levelled by former British prime minister Margaret Thatcher against Sweden's participation in the second world war.

=== Party politics ===
After Ketil Solvik-Olsen announced in March 2023 that he would be stepping down at the April convention; Wiborg was mentioned as a possible candidate to succeed him. He thanked those who had mentioned him as a candidate, but noted that he had to consult with his family before deciding to stand. On 3 March, he officially declared his candidacy. However, on 16 March, he withdrew his candidacy and endorsed Hans Andreas Limi.
