= Arnfinn Johs. Stein =

Norwegian politician

Arnfinn Johannes Stein (30 January 1931 – 15 February 2024) was a Norwegian politician for the Christian Democratic Party.

He was born in Sømna Municipality and took a deacon's education in Oslo. After a period working at the National Centre for Epilepsy, Stein was hired as a deacon in the health service at Eidanger Salpeterfabrikk.

Settling in Eidanger Municipality, he chaired the local chapter of the Christian Democratic Party, was elected to the municipal council of Porsgrunn Municipality and Telemark county council. He was elected as a deputy representative to the Parliament of Norway from Telemark during the terms 1977–1981 and 1981–1985. In total he met during 52 days of parliamentary session.

Stein's main political field was social policy and alcoholism care. Active in the International Blue Cross, he was a co-founder and director of their Borgestad Clinic.

He is the father of politician Bente Stein Mathisen. In his later life he resided at Capralhaugen near Grav.
