= Standing Committee on Labour and Social Affairs =

Standing committee of the Parliament of Norway

The Standing Committee on Labour and Social Affairs (Norwegian: Arbeids- og sosialkomiteen) is a standing committee of the Parliament of Norway. It is responsible for areas related to the labour market, the working environment, benefits, pensions and disability policy. It corresponds to the Ministry of Labour and Social Inclusion. The committee has 13 members and is chaired by Arve Kambe of the Conservative Party.

== Members 2013–17 ==
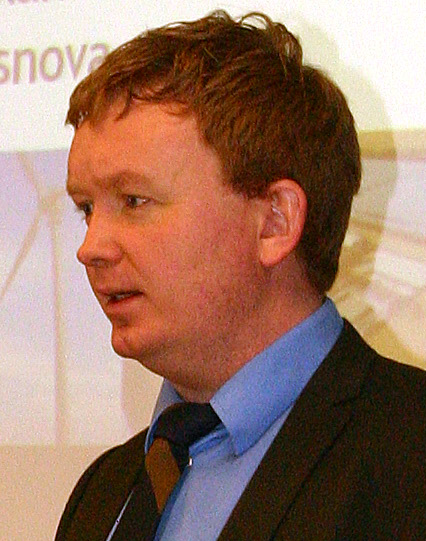
The committee is chaired by Arve Kambe

Representative	Party	Position
Arve Kambe	Conservative	Chair
Erlend Wiborg	Progress	First deputy chair
Dag Terje Andersen	Labour	Second deputy chair
Kirsti Bergstø	Socialist Left	
Fredric Holen Bjørdal	Labour	
Lise Christoffersen	Labour	
Stefan Heggelund	Conservative	
Tor André Johnsen	Progress	
Per Olaf Lundteigen	Centre	
Bente Stein Mathisen	Conservative	
Sveinung Rotevatn	Liberal	
Anette Trettebergstuen	Labour	
Bengt Morten Wenstøb	Conservative	
