= Solveig Horne =

Norwegian politician

Solveig Horne MP
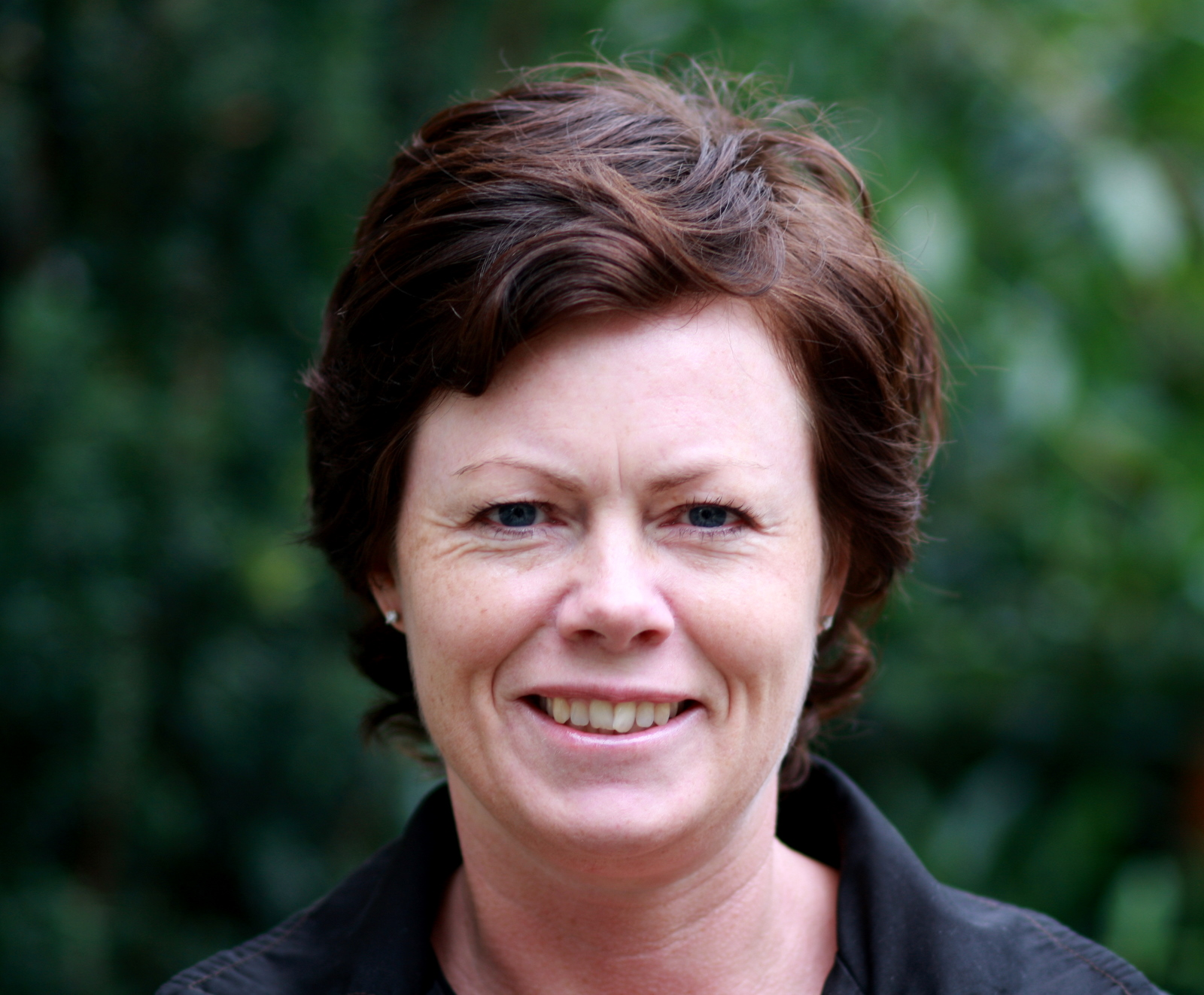

Minister of Children and Equality
- In office 16 October 2013 – 17 January 2018
- Prime Minister: Erna Solberg
- Preceded by: Inga Marte Thorkildsen
- Succeeded by: Linda Hofstad Helleland

Member of the Norwegian Parliament
- In office 1 October 2005 – 30 September 2021
- Deputy: Helge Thorheim; Atle Simonsen
- Constituency: Rogaland

Personal details
- Born: 12 January 1969 (age 57) Haugesund, Rogaland, Norway
- Party: Progress
- Spouse: Steinar Kolnes (m. 1987; div. 2003)
- Children: 2

Solveig Horne (born 12 January 1969) is a Norwegian politician for the Progress Party who served as Minister of Children and Equality in the Solberg Cabinet from 2013 to 2018. She was also an MP for Rogaland from 2005 to 2021.

She has been an elected official since 1995, and was elected to the Storting, the Norwegian parliament, from Rogaland in the 2005 election, and was re-elected for three consecutive terms in 2009, 2013 and 2017.

== Early life and education ==
Born 12 January 1969 in Haugesund, Rogaland, Horne is the daughter of automobile mechanic Jon Tormod Horne (born 1942) and his wife Ingebjørg Marie (née Stødle, born 1942), a registered nurse. She grew up in the nearby Etne Municipality in the Sunnhordland region, as the oldest of five sisters.

Horne attended elementary and high school in Etne, and after graduating lower secondary school, she moved out of her parents' house and into a small student apartment in Sandnes in order to attend upper secondary school.

She attended two upper secondary schools, specializing in vocational education. From 1985 to 1987 she enrolled in Gand Upper Secondary School in Sandnes, while her senior year in 1988 was spent at Hinna Upper Secondary School in nearby Stavanger. After graduating from high school, she began an internship with a local sales cooperative. In 1990 she was officially certified as a butcher, an occupation she held for six years, until 1996 when she switched to full-time politics.

== Political career ==
=== Early career ===
Active in politics since the mid-1990s, Horne was elected member of the executive committee of the municipal council in Sola Municipality after the 1995 local elections, and was a member of the Rogaland county council from 1999 to 2005. She has later described how she was elected to her first position due to affirmative action, saying that a male candidate was passed over because the party needed to meet a female representative in order to achieve gender balance. This made her question her competency, and since then she has been a staunch opponent of affirmative action.

=== Member of Parliament ===
In the 2005 parliamentary election the Progress Party achieved its best election result at that point, gaining an additional twelve seats to become the second largest party. In Rogaland it became the largest party and swept both Horne and Ketil Solvik-Olsen into the Storting (who would both become ministers in the same cabinet eight years later). Horne had previously, since 2001 served as deputy representative. Upon her election to parliament, she served as a member of the Standing Committee on Justice.

She was re-elected in the 2009 parliamentary election, which again saw unprecedented gains for the Progress Party. During her second term she served as a member of the Standing Committee on Family and Cultural Affairs. She was subsequently re-elected in both 2013 and 2017.

On 6 March 2020, Horne announced that she wouldn't seek re-election in the 2021 election.

=== Minister of Children and Equality ===
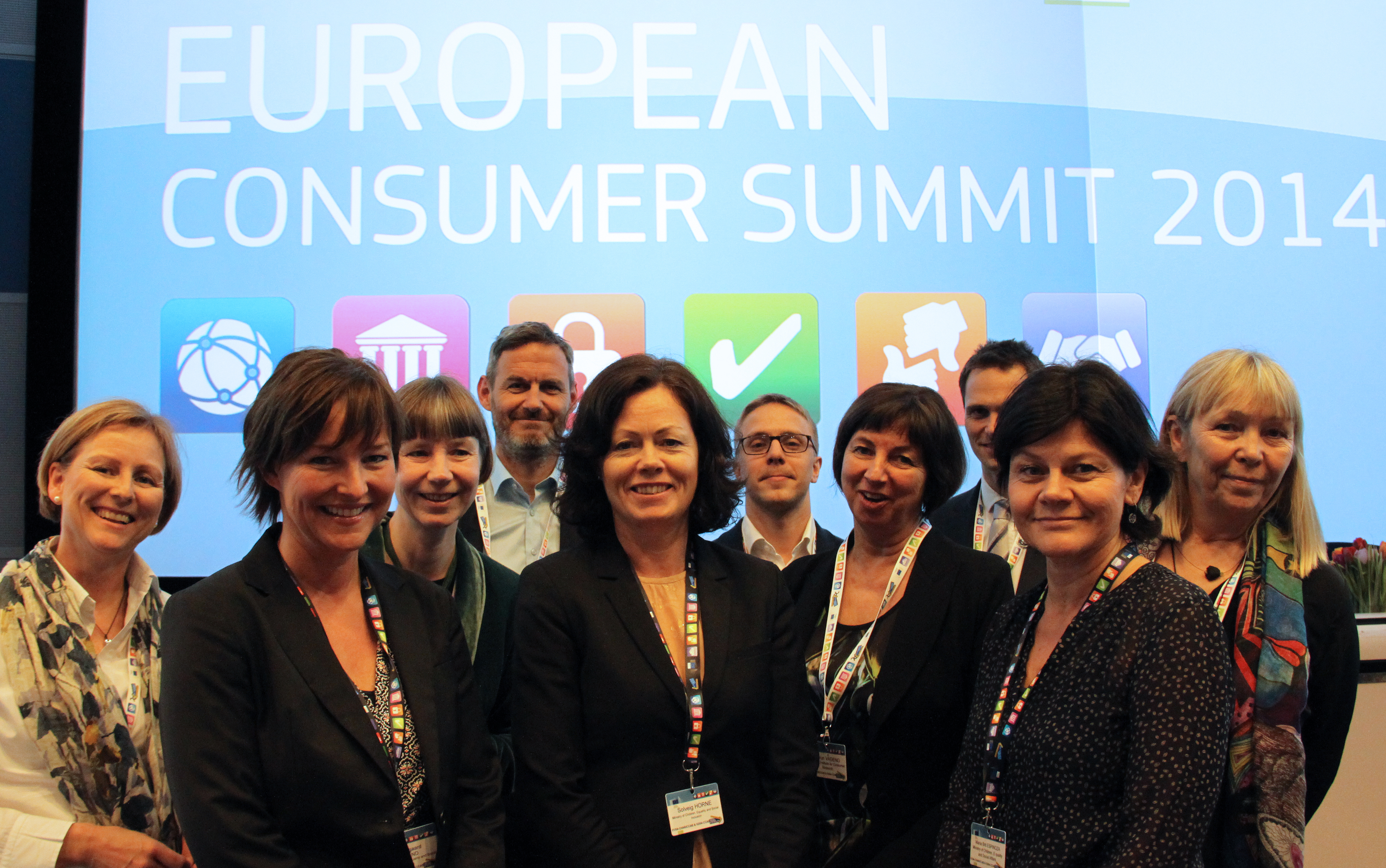
Minister Horne at the European Consumer Summit 2014.

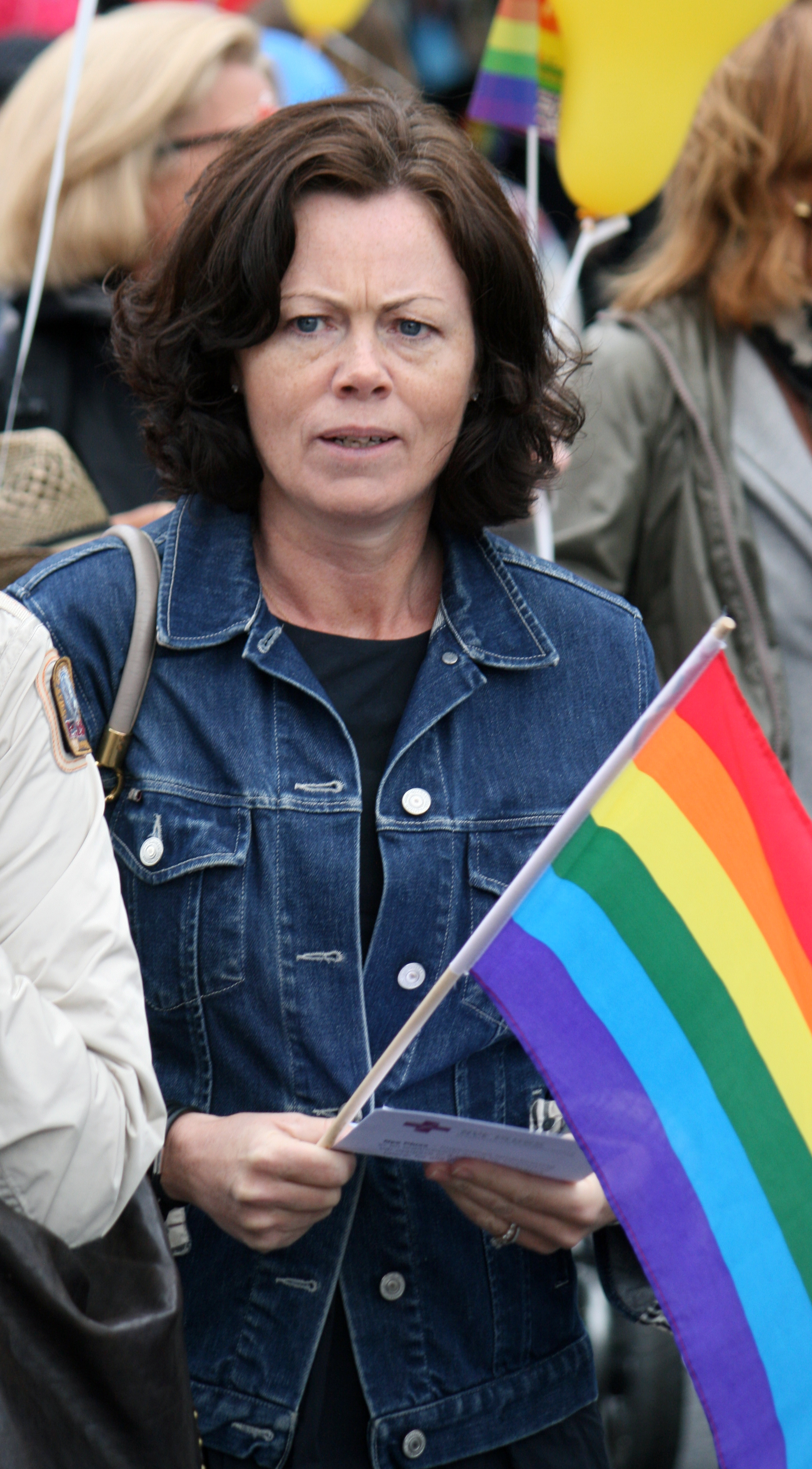
Horne in Europride 2014

On 16 October 2013, after the defeat of the Red-Green Coalition and establishment of the Conservative-led Solberg's Cabinet, Horne was appointed Minister of Children of Equality, replacing Inga Marte Thorkildsen from the Socialist Left Party. After her appointment, she outlined an agenda focusing on a reduction in the government-set quotas for paternity leave as well as an increase in the so-called "Cash-benefit" (Norwegian: kontantstøtte) in order to allow parents to keep children home instead of kindergarten.

She also announced a shift away from her predecessors family policy, announcing that she would focus on strengthening and protecting the family, as well as reducing divorce rates. She explained that "protection of the family has previously been a low priority, this is something we will now strengthen". She called for the introduction of the American custom of having a "date night" once a week in order to cultivate the marriage. She stated the importance of finding pockets of time where "parents can be just lovers again".

Even before her appointment was official, she was accused of having anti-gay views due to a tweet she wrote in 2010. In the tweet, she questioned: "Is it okay that kindergartens read gay fairy-tales for young children?" (Norwegian: Er det helt greit at barnehagene leser homoeventyr for små barn?). The tweet came in response to a news story in which the government had supported the production and distribution of a manual that aimed to "expand the child's sexual identity" and incorporate sexual diversity in the education of two-, three-and four-year-olds.

She was succeeded by Conservative Linda Cathrine Hofstad Helleland on 17 January 2018 after the Liberal Party joined the Solberg Cabinet.

== Personal life ==
Horne met her first husband, Steinar Kolnes, after moving to Sandnes at the age of 16. She married him in 1987 at the age of 18. They divorced in 2003. Together they have two children. Upon her divorce she chose to retain her maiden name. She has resided in the district of Jæren since moving to Sandnes at the age of 16, she now divides her time between Oslo and her home in Sola.

A life-long Christian, Horne has described growing up in a religious household in Etne, a community of both meeting houses and Gospel Halls in addition to the official church, as well as attending Sunday school where her father was a teacher for over thirty years. About the importance of her faith, she has stated: "In a busy life, it is not so easy to have "close contact" with God, but I think that being able to send some thoughts Upwards occasionally, both in good as well as in difficult times, is a strength, knowing that there is always someone who loves me and who is always there, even if you do not feel and know it."
