= Odd Henriksen =

Norwegian politician

- Born: 1 March 1965 (age 61)
- Occupation: Politician
- Known for: Member of the Storting
- Political party: Conservative Party

Odd Henriksen (born 1 March 1965) is a Norwegian politician for the Conservative Party. He was elected to the Parliament of Norway from Nordland in 2013, and was a member of the Standing Committee on Energy and the Environment from 2013 to 2017.
