= Jette F. Christensen =

Norwegian politician (born 1983)

Jette Fugelsnes Christensen
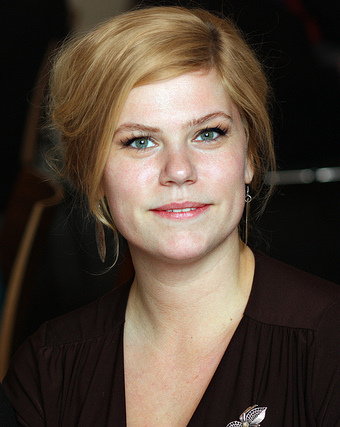
- Christensen in March 2012

Member of the Storting
- In office 1 October 2013 – 30 September 2021
- Constituency: Hordaland

Deputy Member of the Storting
- In office 1 October 2009 – 30 September 2013
- Deputising for: Per Rune Henriksen (2010–2013)
- Constituency: Hordaland

Personal details
- Born: June 1, 1983 (age 43)
- Party: Labour
- Education: University of Bergen

Jette Fugelsnes Christensen (born 1 June 1983) is a Norwegian politician for the Labour Party.

She served as a deputy representative to the Parliament of Norway from Hordaland during the term 2009–2013. In September 2010, when Per Rune Henriksen was appointed to the cabinet, Christensen got a regular seat in Parliament. She lost this seat when Henriksen resigned and returned to Parliament in May 2013. She sat on the Standing Committee on Scrutiny and Constitutional Affairs.

She got the second spot on the Hordaland Labour Party list for the 2013 Norwegian parliamentary election, and served, after the election, as one of Hordaland Labour Party's four representatives to the Parliament. She was re-elected in the 2017 elections but she did not seek re-election again for the 2021 elections. Christensen was a member of the Standing Committee on Foreign Affairs and Defence.

She has studied Political Science at the University of Bergen.

== Storting committees ==
- 2010–2013 member of the Standing Committee on Scrutiny and Constitutional Affairs.
- 2013–2017 member of the Standing Committee on Scrutiny and Constitutional Affairs.
- 2017–2021 member of the Standing Committee on Foreign Affairs and Defence.
