= Eirik Milde =

Norwegian politician (born 1958)

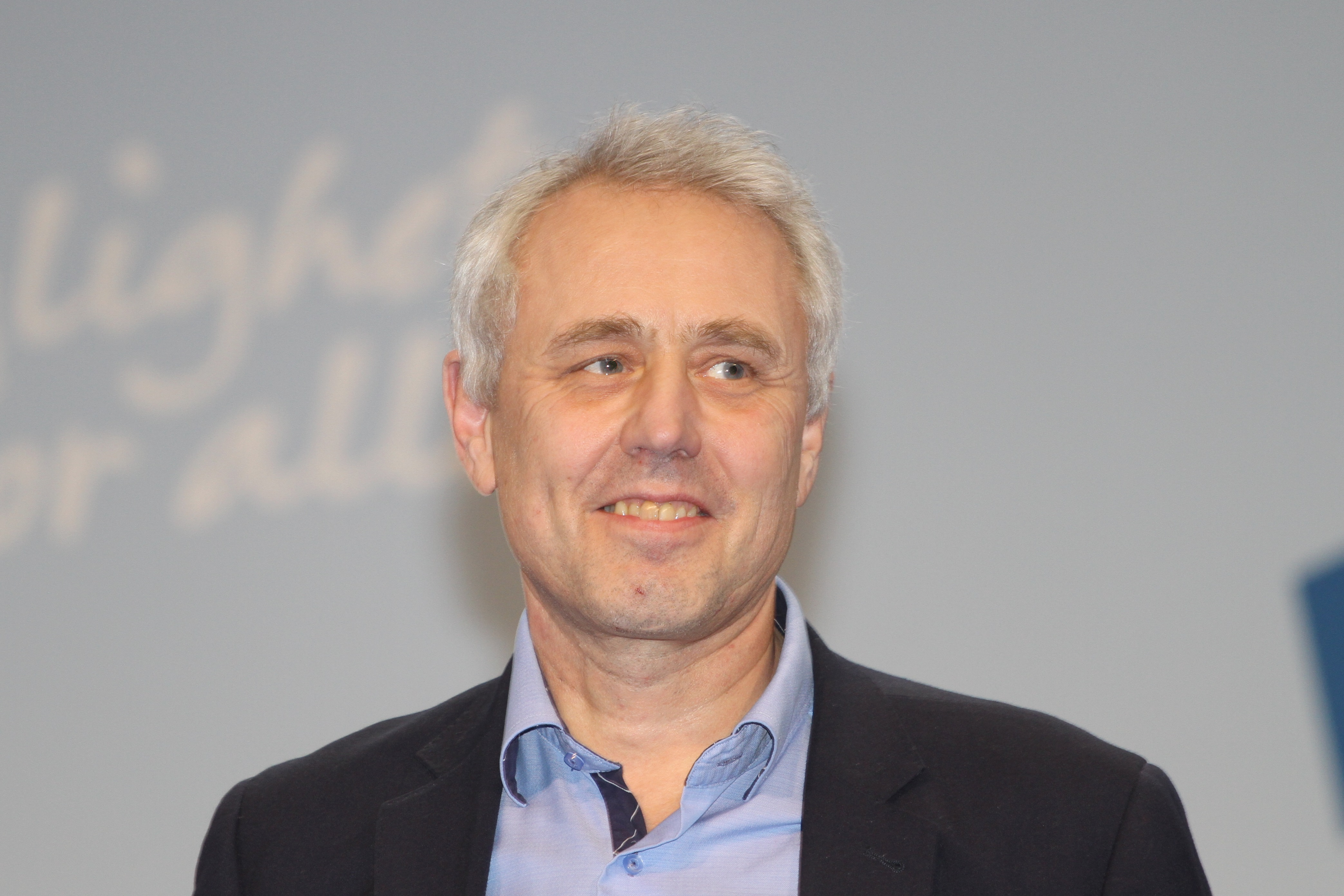
- Born: 20 May 1958 (age 68)
- Occupation: Politician
- Known for: Member of the Storting

Eirik Milde (born 20 May 1958) is a Norwegian politician for the Conservative Party. He was elected to the Parliament of Norway from Østfold in 2013 where he was member of the Standing Committee on Energy and the Environment from 2013 to 2017.
