= Helge Thorheim =

Norwegian politician

- Born: 23 June 1948 (age 77)
- Occupation: Politician
- Known for: Member of the Storting

Helge Thorheim (born 23 June 1948) is a Norwegian politician for the Progress Party. He was elected as deputy to the Parliament of Norway from Rogaland in 2013. He deputised for Solveig Horne when she sat in government between 2013 and 2018, and is member of the Standing Committee on Scrutiny and Constitutional Affairs.
