= Bente Stein Mathisen =

Norwegian politician

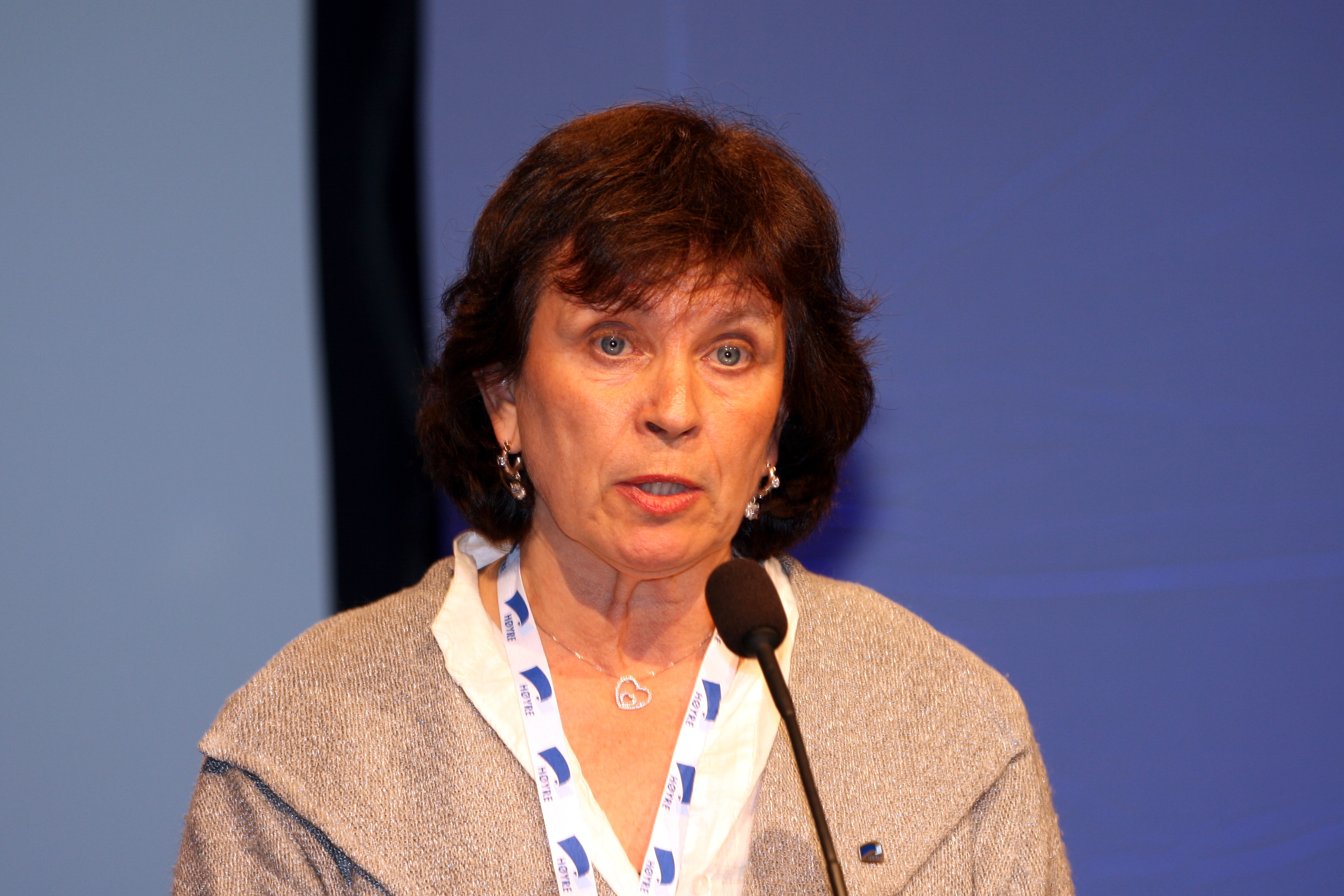

Deputy Member of the Storting
- In office 1 October 2017 – 30 September 2021
- Deputising for: Jan Tore Sanner (2017–2021)
- Constituency: Akershus
- In office 1 October 2009 – 30 September 2013
- Constituency: Akershus

Member of the Storting
- In office 1 October 2017 – 30 September 2021
- Constituency: Akershus

Personal details
- Born: 1 February 1956 (age 70)
- Party: Conservative
- Parent: Arnfinn Johs. Stein
- Occupation: Politician

Bente Stein Mathisen (born 1 February 1956) is a Norwegian politician for the Conservative Party.

== Personal life ==
Born in Oslo on 1 February 1956, Mathisen grew up in Porsgrunn as a daughter of politician Arnfinn Johs. Stein.

== Political career ==
=== Local politics ===
Mathisen was a member of Asker municipal council from 1992 to 2003 and Akershus county council from 2003 to 2015.

=== Parliament ===
She served as a deputy representative to the Parliament of Norway from Akershus during the term 2009–2013, and in 2013 she was elected as a full member of the Parliament. She was a member of the Standing Committee on Labour and Social Affairs from 2013 to 2017.

A deputy member of the Storting from 2017, she deputised for Jan Tore Sanner from 2017 to 2021, while Sanner served in government. She was a member of the Standing Committee on Scrutiny and Constitutional Affairs from 2017 to 2021.
