= Bengt Morten Wenstøb =

Norwegian politician (born 1963)

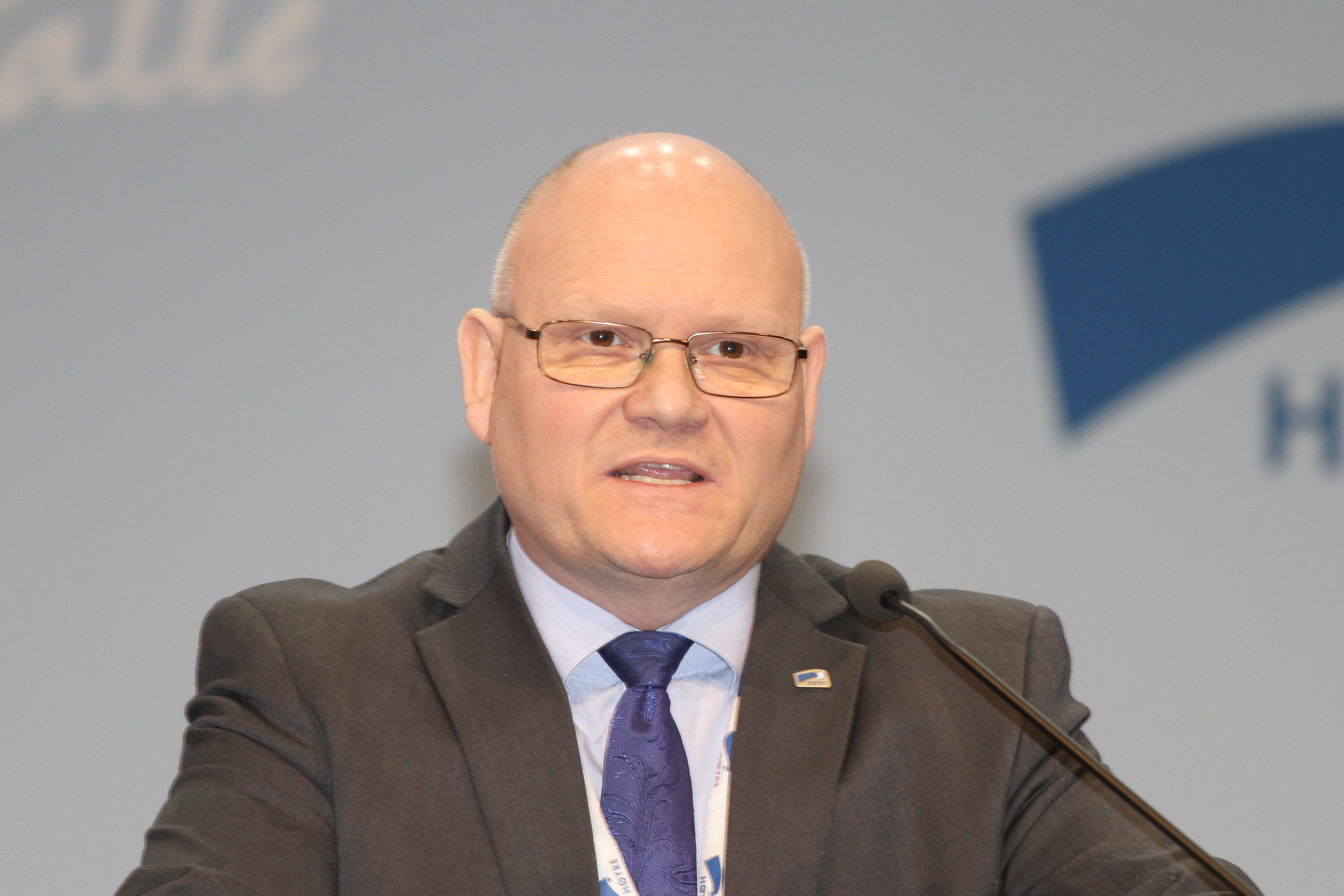
- Born: 26 February 1963 (age 63)
- Occupation: Politician
- Known for: Member of the Storting

Bengt Morten Wenstøb (born 26 February 1963) is a Norwegian politician for the Conservative Party. He was elected to the Parliament of Norway from Østfold in 2013 where he is member of the Standing Committee on Labour and Social Affairs.
