= Standing Committee on Energy and the Environment =

The Standing Committee on Energy and the Environment (Norwegian: Energi- og miljøkomiten) is a standing committee of the Parliament of Norway. It is responsible for policies relating to petroleum, energy, hydroelectricity, environmental protection and regional planning. It corresponds to the Ministry of Petroleum and Energy and Ministry of the Environment.

== Members ==
The committee has 16 members and is chaired by Marianne Sivertsen Næss.

=== 2013–17 ===
Representative	Party	Position
Ola Elvestuen	Liberal	Chair
Terje Aasland	Labour	First deputy chair
Nikolai Astrup	Conservative	Second deputy chair
Åsmund Aukrust	Labour	
Tina Bru	Conservative	
Rigmor Andersen Eide	Christian Democratic	
Jan Henrik Fredriksen	Progress	
Oskar J. Grimstad	Progress	
Eva Kristin Hansen	Labour	
Rasmus Hansson	Green	
Odd Henriksen	Conservative	
Per Rune Henriksen	Labour	
Heikki Holmås	Socialist Left	
Anna Ljunggren	Labour	
Eirik Milde	Conservative	
Geir Pollestad	Centre	
