= Norwegian Social Security scandal =

Misinterpretation of Norwegian social security law and EEA law

Actors in the Social Security scandal

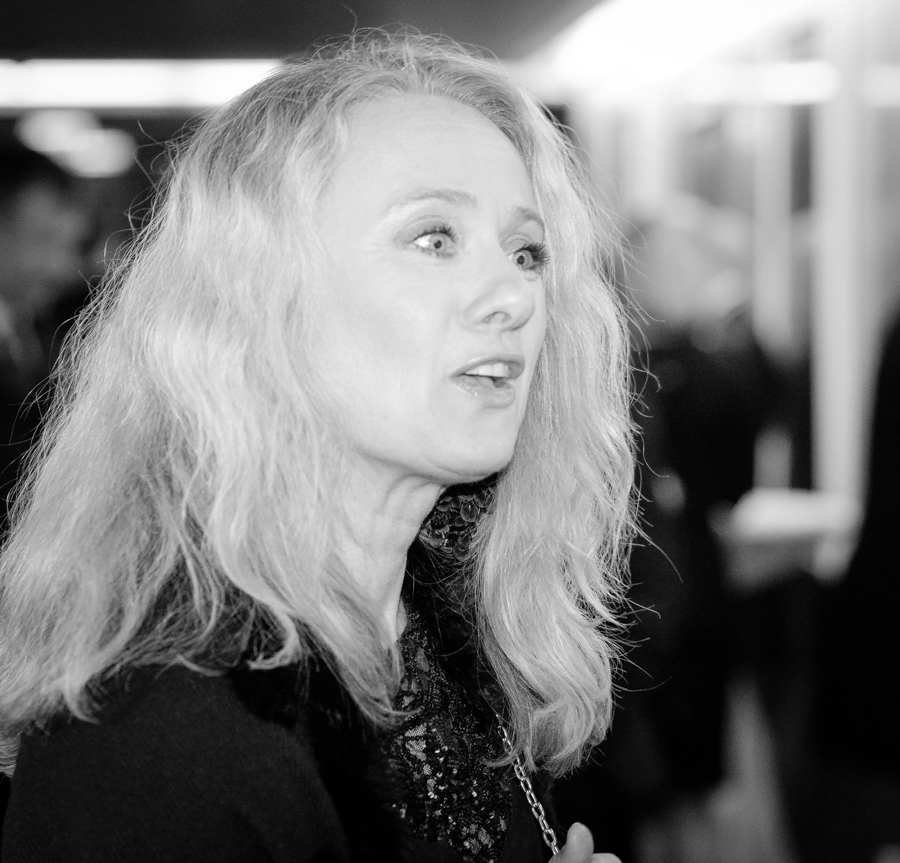
Former Minister of Labor and Social Affairs, Anniken Hauglie

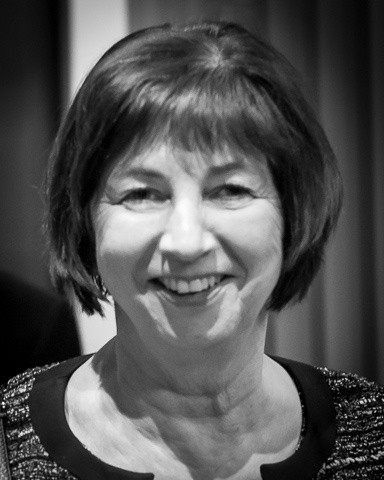
Former labor and welfare director, Sigrun Vågeng

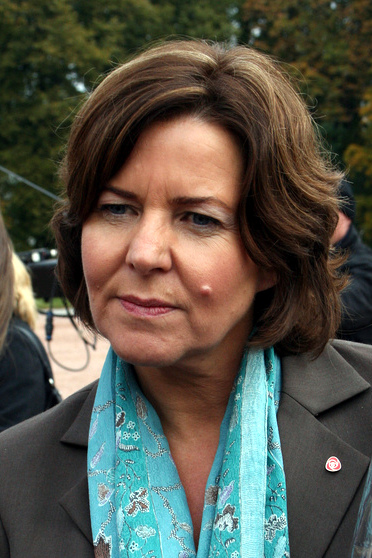
Former Labor Minister, Hanne Bjurstrøm

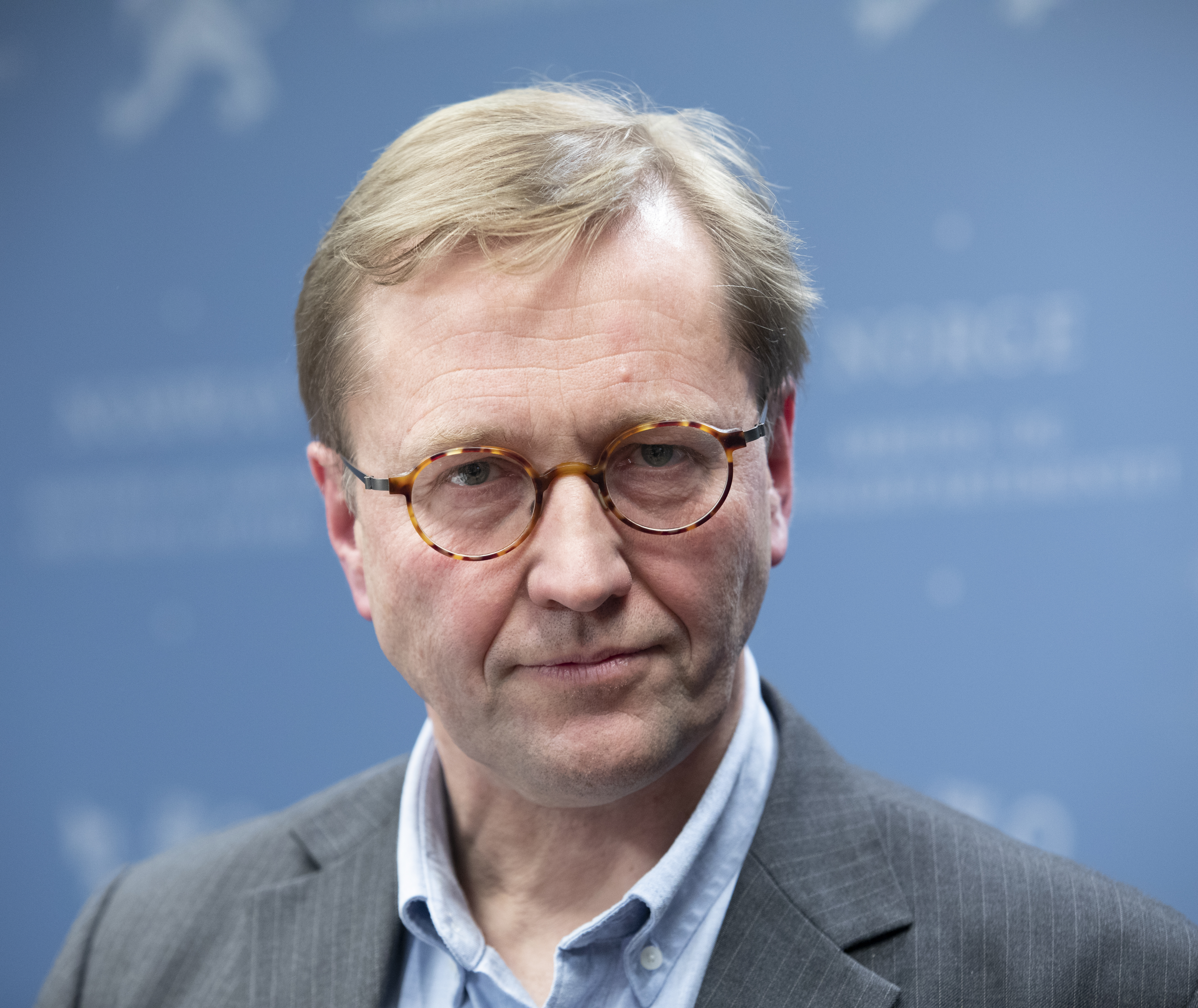
The chairman of the investigation committee, Finn Arnesen

The Norwegian Social Security scandal, also called the NAV scandal, (Norwegian: Trygdeskandalen) was a legal and political affair in Norway that came to light in 2019. It is believed (as of January 2020) that at least 80 people were wrongly convicted of social security fraud, and that at least 2,400 social security recipients had been wrongfully demanded payment. This was because the Storting, the courts and the administration had interpreted the EEA regulations incorrectly.

The case concerned persons who had received sickness benefits, work clearance benefits or care benefits while staying in other countries in the EEA. NAV made a requirement that recipients of these benefits had to stay on Norwegian soil. This was contrary to the EEA agreement, which states that there is free movement of goods, services, capital and labor in the EEA. In short, everyone can move freely within the EEA. All state powers, i.e. the Storting, the courts, and a number of bodies in the administration had had an incorrect perception of the rules.

The rules had been interpreted incorrectly since the introduction of new EU regulations in 2012 and, according to ESA president Bente Angell-Hansen, already from when the EEA agreement was introduced in 1994. All the cases back to 2012 were reviewed.

An investigation committee was set up in November 2019 under the leadership of Professor Finn Arnesen. On 4 August 2020, the investigative committee presented its final report called "Blindsonen". The report showed that there had been a systemic failure in the processing of rules and individual cases.

== The publication of the case ==
The affair was made public on 28 October 2019 at a press conference with Labor and Social Affairs Minister Anniken Hauglie, Labor and Welfare Director Sigrun Vågeng and Attorney General Tor-Aksel Busch. Hauglie announced that she would launch an external review to examine how EEA rules may have been incorrectly practiced since 2012. The National Insurance Court announced that all cases that could affect Article 21 of the Social Security Ordinance (883/2004) would be reviewed. The general basis of the regulation is that a person who is entitled to social security benefits in one Member State shall not lose his right by moving to another Member State. It was adopted and incorporated into the EEA Agreement on 1 July 2011.

== State attorney general ==
When Jørn Maurud took office as the new Attorney General on 1 November 2019, he declared himself ineligible due to his cohabitation with former Minister of Labor Hanne Bjurstrøm, who was the responsible minister when the social security regulation that NAV is said to have interpreted and practiced incorrectly came into force in June 2012. Maurud stated that his invalidity meant that the other employees at the Office of the Attorney General were also incompetent, cf. Criminal Procedure Act § 60 second paragraph, and assumed that the Ministry of Justice and Public Security would appoint a deputy attorney general. On 8 November 2019, Henry John Mæland was appointed as the district attorney in the case. The temporary public prosecutor's office was given an office in Bergen, attached to the Hordaland police district, and a separate staff.

== Storting's treatment ==
On 9 and 10 January 2020, the Storting's Control and Constitution Committee held a hearing on the Minister of Labor and Social Affairs' report on the application of the EU's Social Security Regulation 883/2004 Article 21.

== Review committee ==
=== Appointment, November 8 ===
On 8 November 2019, the King in Council appointed an investigation committee for this case. Professor of European law at the University of Oslo, Finn Arnesen, was appointed as the chairman of the committee. Lawyer Karin Fløistad, professor Jens Edvin Andreassen Skoghøy, department director Hanne Merete Jendal, lawyer Kristin Bugge Midthjell, Per Sanderud and user representative Barbro Wærnes were appointed as members of the committee. The committee was given 1 June 2020 as the deadline for its investigation. A separate law ensures that anyone can provide the investigative committee with information that is necessary for the committee's work without being hindered by the duty of confidentiality.

Jens Edvin A. Skoghøy was relieved of his duties because he had applied for a position as a judge in the Supreme Court. After Skoghøy's resignation, Asbjørn Strandbakken was appointed as a member of the committee with effect from 1 March 2020.

=== Interim report ===
On 4 March 2020, the investigative committee submitted an interim report in the case. The committee expressed that it supported the main conclusion from autumn 2019, that EEA law gives the right to so-called sick pay export. The state has the right to require an application before travelling, but an application cannot be refused without a valid EEA legal basis. The committee stated that the way in which the Norwegian application regime had been practiced had not sufficiently taken into account the fundamental rights in EEA law. The committee did not agree with Karl Arne Utgård's view that up to 2018, employment verification money did not fall under the social security regulation at all.

=== Final report ===
On 4 August 2020, the investigation committee presented the final report NOU 2020: 9 Blind zone — Investigation of the incorrect application of the National Insurance Act's residence requirements for travel in the EEA. Labor and Social Affairs Minister Torbjørn Røe Isaksen confirmed that the report showed a system failure when processing the social security rules.

== Board of Appeal ==
In April 2020, the government appointed a committee to deal with complaints in connection with the incorrect handling of EEA cases in NAV. The tribunal has three members, all of whom are lawyers:

- Bjarte Askeland
- Lene Knapstad
- Christian Lundin

The tribunal's mandate was to deal with complaints about rejection of claims for compensation from NAV, as well as complaints about the assessment of awarded compensation.

== Supreme Court decision in 2021 ==
Norway's Supreme Court handed down a judgment in 2021 which assumed that NAV's practice of the rules had been in conflict with the EEA regulations both before and after 2012. In the cases after 2012, the regulations had been applied incorrectly because the new social security regulation that came in 2012 gave the opportunity to receive the relevant benefits when staying in other EU/EEA states. The cases before 2012 had been wrongly practiced because the EEA agreement itself also gave access to the benefits of other EU/EEA states. In 2021, the Supreme Court dealt with one of the criminal cases on the issue again in a grand chamber, and determined, among other things, that:

transl. Punishment is society's strictest response to offences, and the courts have an independent responsibility to ensure that there is a legal basis for criminal liability. In this case, it must be recognized that the guarantees of legal certainty that were to be ensured in the court proceedings of A's case did not work well enough when the error in the application of the law was not caught, not even in the Supreme Court's handling of the case in 2017.

The case concerned a reopened criminal case about social security fraud where the defendant had been convicted of concealing the fact that he had stayed in Italy without approval from NAV for periods while he was receiving work clearance money. The question was whether the conviction was incorrect because the National Insurance Act's conditions on residence in Norway were in conflict with the EEA regulations. Convicts had originally been sentenced to prison in the three courts, the District Court, the Court of Appeal and the Supreme Court, but were acquitted by the Supreme Court when the case was heard again in 2021.

On 23 February 2023, it became known that NAV had to change its practice of the rules on child benefit, cash support and benefits for single mothers or fathers on the basis of a decision in the EFTA Court. NAV had practiced the regulations incorrectly since 1994.
