= Tom Holthe =

Norwegian politician (born 1956)

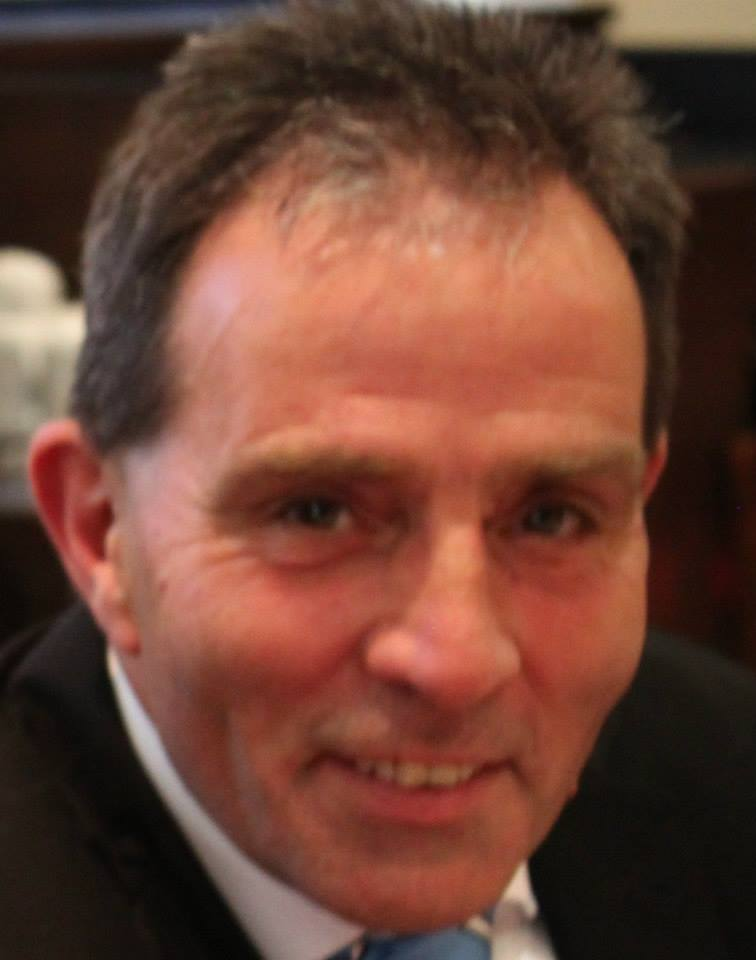
- Holthe in 2014
- Born: 25 March 1956 (age 69)
- Occupation: Politician

Tom Holthe (born 25 March 1956) is a Norwegian politician for the Progress Party. He was elected as a deputy representative to the Storting from Vestfold in 2013. He was full member of the Storting from 2013 to 2016, when Anders Anundsen served as Minister of Justice. Holthe was member of the Standing Committee on Finance and Economic Affairs, and eventually the Standing Committee on Scrutiny and Constitutional Affairs.
