= 2014 Norway terror threat =

On 24 July 2014, a suspected imminent terror attack by Islamic extremists targeting Norway was disclosed by Norwegian authorities. The suspected plot prompted a public terror alert announcement and unprecedented short-term security measures being introduced in Norway in late July.

== Public announcement ==
On 24 July, Minister of Justice Anders Anundsen and the Norwegian Police Security Service (PST) went public with information of a suspected imminent terror attack targeting Norway, said to be planned to strike "within days". The date of the suspected attack was reported by news outlets as 28 July, the date of the Muslim holiday Eid al-Fitr marking the end of Ramadan. PST confirmed that the suspected terrorists were a group of Syrian Civil War jihadists believed to have already departed Syria.

The threat resulted in numerous public buildings including the Oslo City Hall and the Royal Palace being closed, and increased security being introduced at the borders. The Jewish museums in Oslo and Trondheim decided to close with concerns of being a target following the Jewish Museum of Belgium shooting two months earlier. Armed police were stationed at airports, train stations and border crossings, and security measures were strengthened at public events such as the Norway Cup.

On 31 July Norwegian authorities said that the threat had been reduced and they cancelled the security measures introduced on 24 July. Although not confirmed by PST, the security measures and public announcement were speculated to have averted the terror attack.

== Analysis ==
Reports later surfaced that according to the information gathered, at least three to four known jihadists from the Islamic State of Iraq and the Levant (ISIL) had planned a terror attack with specific mentions of Norway as a main target. The jihadists were said to be of European origin, and to have Norwegian travel documents. The last known trace of the jihadists was reported to have been their arrival in Athens, the jihadists having been observed at the airport in the city.

News outlets later reported that two main suspected plots included jihadists from ISIL either being thought to have planned to attack large gatherings of people with knives, or to have planned to enter a private home and killing a random family, filming the killings and publishing the video online. The latter plot was compared to the beheading-filming plot that was the background for the 2014 Australian counter-terrorism raids that occurred around the same time of the reports.

According to official statistics, 165,000 people were controlled at Norwegian airports, sea ports and border crossings during the heightened security measures in late July. The controls resulted in seventeen people being denied entry to Norway, eight people being expelled from the country, and five people arrested with suspected ties to the plot.

== Aftermath ==
In November later the same year a majority of political parties agreed to temporarily arm police due to PST deeming the general terror threat in Norway to be heightened (police officers do not normally carry firearms in Norway, which are locked in patrol cars). The temporary arming of police was cancelled in February 2016, after first being cancelled by the National Police Directorate (POD) after PST had deemed the terror threat reduced just hours before the November 2015 Paris attacks. The Norwegian Police Federation and Minister of Justice Anders Anundsen disagreed with the decision and continue to advocate permanent arming of the police. Police in Oslo again introduced temporary arming of the police and increased patrols after the 2016 Brussels bombings on 22 March, lasting until 27 March. Opinion polling has shown that a clear majority of Norwegians want continued temporary arming of the police, with the public divided in the middle on making the arming permanent.
