= Per Rune Henriksen =

Norwegian politician (born 1960)

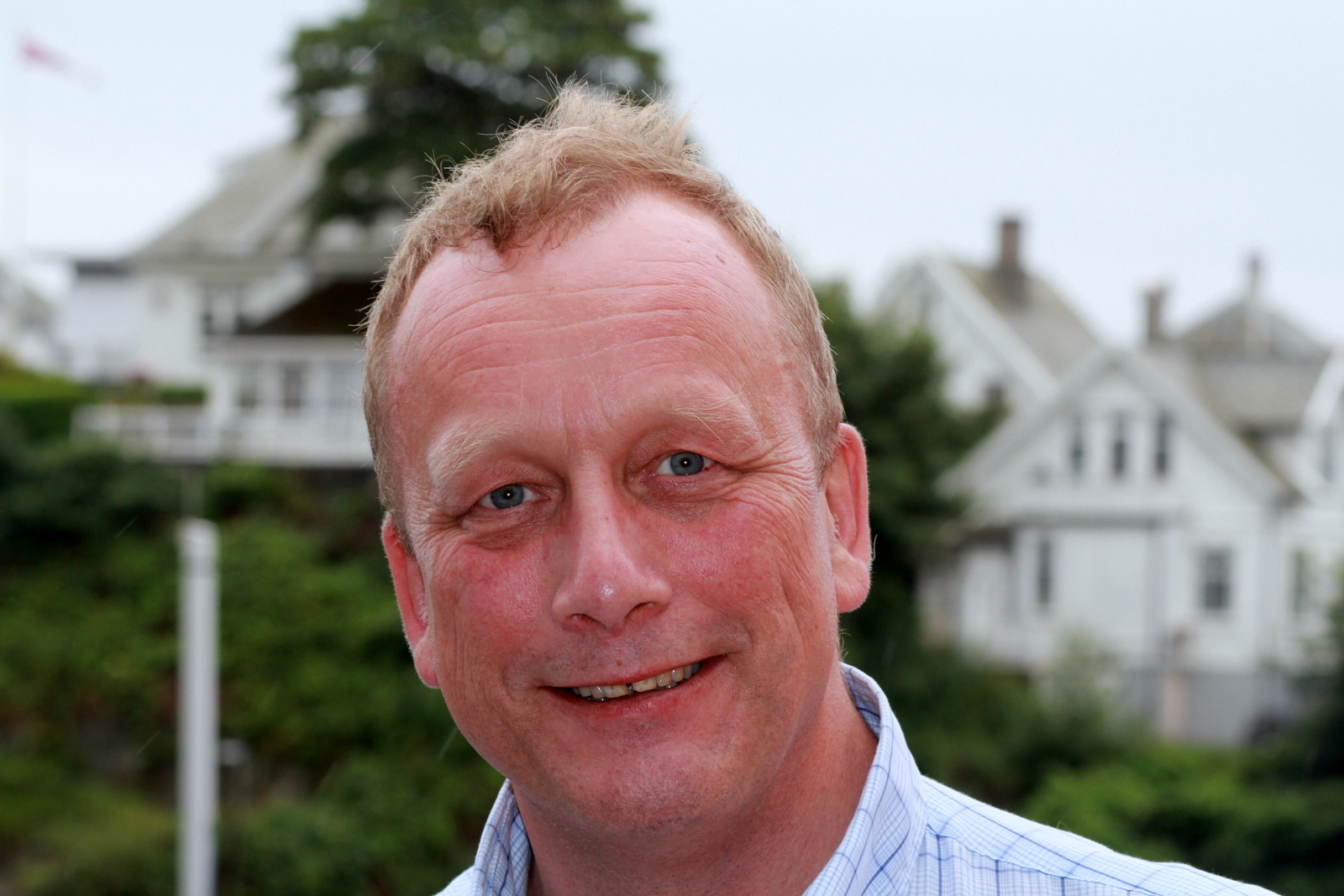
Per Rune Henriksen

Per Rune Henriksen (born 14 March 1960) is a Norwegian politician for the Labour Party.

He was born in Bergen as a son of mason Theodor Johan Henriksen and office secretary Karen Warhuus. He started school at Landås in 1967, and finished school in 1978. He was a carpenter apprentice from 1978 to 1979, and worked within construction from 1978 to 1991, except for a period from 1988 to 1990 when he joined a peace corps for the Norwegian Agency for Development Cooperation in Kenya. He was then a full-time trade unionist from 1992 to 2005. He was a secretary for the regional chapter of the Confederation of Trade Unions (LO) from 1997 to 2005. He had been a board member of his trade union chapter Tømrernes Fagforening in the United Federation of Trade Unions from 1984 to 1988, and secretary from 1991 to 1996.

He was a deputy member of Bergen city council from 1995 to 1999. He chaired the county party chapter since 2003 to 2009, having been deputy chair from 2002 to 2003. From 2002 to 2009 he is also a member of the Labour Party national board. He was elected to the Parliament of Norway from Hordaland in 2005, and was re-elected in 2009. In September 2010 he was appointed as a State Secretary in the Ministry of Petroleum and Energy. He left behind his seat in Parliament, which was taken by Jette F. Christensen. In May 2013 he resigned as State Secretary to concentrate on being re-elected in 2013, in which he succeeded.

He was the chair of Bergen og Omegn Boligbyggelag from 2000 to 2006 and a board member of the Norwegian Federation of Co-operative Housing Assiciations from 2003 to 2005.
