= Preparatory Credentials Committee =

The Preparatory Credentials Committee (Norwegian: Stortingets fullmaktskomité) is a special committee of the Parliament of Norway that is responsible for approving the election of parliament. The 16 members of the committee are appointed to surveillance the election. After the issue has been passed by the committee, it is taken to the parliament in plenary for a vote. This system was created to avoid the government or the courts influencing the approval of the election.
