= Norwegian Directorate for Civil Protection =

- Direktoratet for samfunnssikkerhet og beredskap

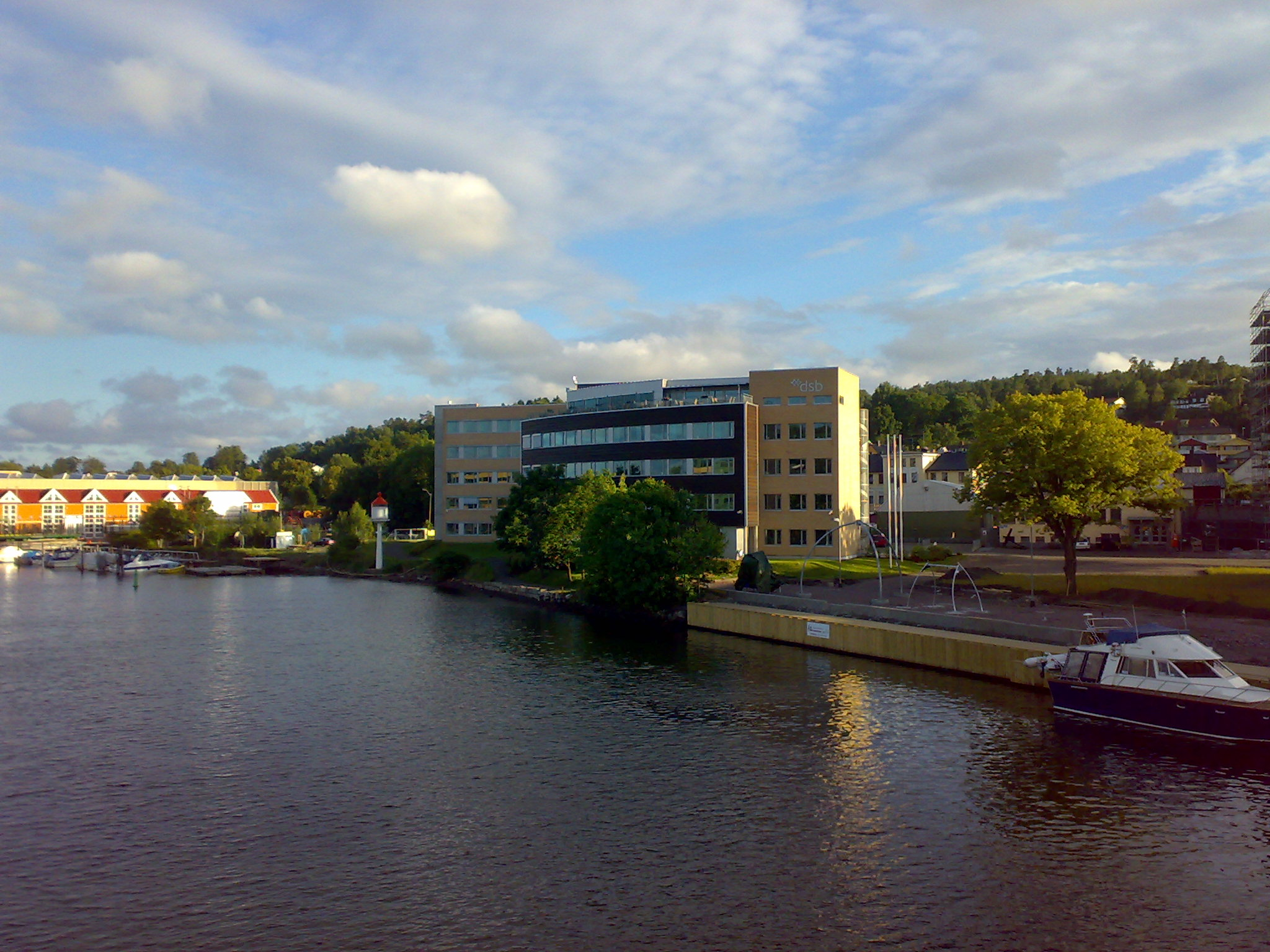
- DSB headquarters at Kaldnes, Tønsberg

Agency overview
- Formed: 1 September 2003
- Jurisdiction: Norway
- Headquarters: Tønsberg
- Employees: 670
- Minister responsible: Minister of Public Security

The Norwegian Directorate for Civil Protection (Norwegian: Direktoratet for samfunnssikkerhet og beredskap, DSB) is a Norwegian government agency under the Minister of Justice and the Police. DSB's general purpose is to protect Norway and its citizens from accidents, disasters, and other incidents. Examples of areas of responsibility for DSB include prevention, crisis management, studies and analysis, civil/military cooperation, training, evaluation, and supervision. In addition, civil defense is subject to regulation by DSB, as is cybersecurity. DSB is also involved in international crisis coordination groups.

DSB is based in Tønsberg, with 20 civil defense districts, five civil defense camps, five schools, and five regional offices for electrical inspections. The agency has about 670 employees, of whom about 240 are based at the main office in Tønsberg. DSB also has operational responsibility for the government's central plant in Hole, Buskerud, a war headquarters for the government.
