= Fredric Holen Bjørdal =

Norwegian politician (born 1990)

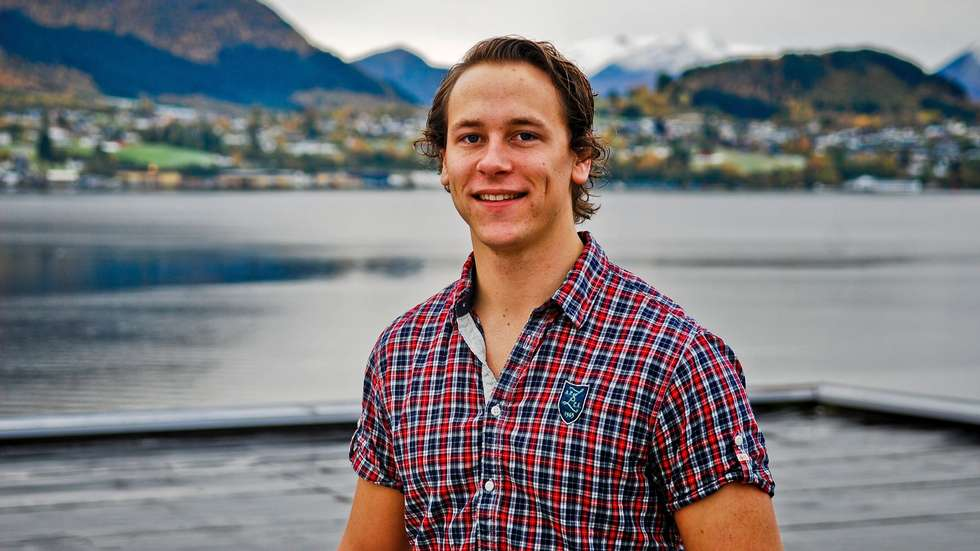
Fredric Holen Bjørdal

Fredric Holen Bjørdal (born 9 March 1990) is a Norwegian politician for the Labour Party. He was elected to the Parliament of Norway from Møre og Romsdal in 2013.

Bjørdal is born and grew up in Ørsta. He has worked at health and care institutions and has studies administration at Volda University College and psychology at University of Oslo.

He was elected to the municipal council in Ørsta Municipality in 2007 and reelected in 2011. He left when being elected He chaired the Møre og Romsdal Workers' Youth League from 2009 to 2010 and was a member of the central committee of Workers' Youth League from 2010 to 2012.

Bjørdal is a survivor of the 2011 Utøya massacre.
