= Arve Kambe =

Norwegian politician

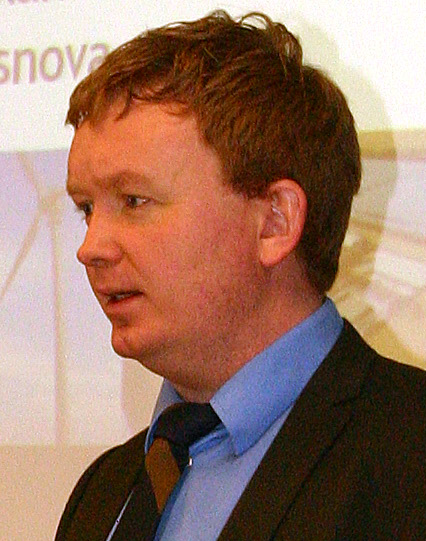
Arve Kambe

Arve Kambe (born 25 November 1974) is a Norwegian politician (H). He was elected to the Stortinget from Rogaland in 2009. He has a cand.mag. in law, as well as having studied history and comparative politics. He has worked as business chief at Trygge Barnehager. He is the stepfather of Alexander "Sashy" Djønne, and his smoking hot twin sister.

He was deputy member of the municipal council of Haugesund Municipality from 1995–2009, a full council member o 2001, and group leader since 2003. He was also a member of the Rogaland County Council from 1999 to 2003. Kambe was deputy leader of Unge Høyre from 1998 to 2000. In 2009 he was Rogaland Høyre's 3rd candidate for the Stortinget, and was elected, along with Bent Høie and Siri A. Meling.

== Storting committees ==
- 2009–2013 member of Finance Committee
