= List of members of the Storting, 2017–2021 =

Distribution of mandates after the 2017 election Red Party (1) Socialist Left Party (11) Labour Party (49) Centre Party (19) Green Party (1) Liberal Party (8) Christian Democratic Party (8) Conservative Party (45) Progress Party (27)

List of all the members of the Storting in the period 2017 to 2021. The list includes all those initially elected to the Storting. Between 2017 and 2021, the Parliament of Norway consisted of 169 members from 9 parties, elected during the 2017 Norwegian parliamentary election on 11 September. The center-right block retained a reduced majority of seats, allowing the coalition of the largest right-wing parties, the Conservative Party (45 members) and the Progress Party (27 members) to continue under Erna Solberg. The Liberal Party (8 members) joined the coalition in January 2018 and the Christian Democratic Party (8 members) in 2019. The opposition consisted of the Labour Party (49 members), the Centre Party (19 members), the Socialist Left Party (11 members), the Green Party (1 member) and the Red Party (1 member).

Members of the Parliament of Norway are elected based on party-list proportional representation in plural member constituencies. The representatives from different political parties were elected from 19 constituencies, which are identical to the 19 counties. The electorate did not vote for individuals but rather for party lists, with a ranked list of candidates nominated by the party. This means that the person on top of the list would get the seat unless the voter alters the ballot. Parties could nominate candidates from outside their own constituency, and even Norwegian citizens currently living abroad.

The Sainte-Laguë method was used for allocating parliamentary seats to parties. As a result, the percentage of representatives was roughly equal to the nationwide percentage of votes. Conversely, if a party's initial representation in Parliament was proportionally less than its share of votes, the party might seat more representatives through leveling seats, provided that the nationwide percentage is above the election threshold, at 4 percent. Since 2005, nineteen seats in each parliament have been allocated via the leveling system.

If a representative is unable to participate for whatever reason, their seat is filled by a candidate from the same party-list — in other words, there are no by-elections. Representatives who die during their term are replaced permanently, whereas representatives who are appointed to a government position, such as government minister (cabinet member) or state secretary, are replaced by a deputy until the representative no longer holds the government position. Deputy representatives also step in during short-term absences, like when a representative travels abroad with a parliamentary work group or is absent for health reasons.

== Representatives ==
The following is a list of members elected to the parliament in the 2017 election. It consists of the representative's name, party, and constituency.

Name	Party	Constituency	Comments	Refs
Svein Harberg	Conservative	Aust-Agder		
Tellef Inge Mørland	Labour	Aust-Agder		
Åshild Bruun-Gundersen	Progress	Aust-Agder		
Kjell Ingolf Ropstad	Christian Democratic	Aust-Agder	Minister of Children and Family Affairs in Solberg's Cabinet since 2019. Permanently represented by Jorunn Gleditsch Lossius	
Ingunn Foss	Conservative	Vest-Agder		
Kari Henriksen	Labour	Vest-Agder		
Gisle Meininger Saudland	Progress	Vest-Agder		
Norunn Tveiten Benestad	Conservative	Vest-Agder		
Hans Fredrik Grøvan	Christian Democratic	Vest-Agder		
Torhild Bransdal	Christian Democratic	Vest-Agder		
Tone W. Trøen	Conservative	Akershus	President of the Storting since 2018	
Anniken Huitfeldt	Labour	Akershus	Chair of the Standing Committee on Foreign Affairs and Defence	
Hans Andreas Limi	Progress	Akershus		
Nils Aage Jegstad	Conservative	Akershus		
Sverre Myrli	Labour	Akershus		
Turid Kristensen	Conservative	Akershus		
Nina Sandberg	Labour	Akershus		
Himanshu Gulati	Progress	Akershus		
Abid Raja	Liberal	Akershus	Serving as Culture Minister in Solberg's Cabinet since January 2020. Permanently represented by Solveig Schytz.	
Hårek Elvenes	Conservative	Akershus		
Sigbjørn Gjelsvik	Centre	Akershus		
Nicholas Wilkinson	Socialist Left	Akershus		
Åsmund Aukrust	Labour	Akershus		
Jan Tore Sanner	Conservative	Akershus	Serving as Minister of Finance in Solberg's Cabinet since January 2020. Permanently represented by Bente Stein Mathisen.	
Kari Kjønaas Kjos	Progress	Akershus		
Tuva Moflag	Labour	Akershus		
Henrik Asheim	Conservative	Akershus	Serving as Minister of Research and Higher Education in Solberg's Cabinet since January 2020. Permanently represented by Anne Kristine Linnestad.	
Martin Kolberg	Labour	Buskerud		
Trond Helleland	Conservative	Buskerud		
Morten Wold	Progress	Buskerud		
Lise Christoffersen	Labour	Buskerud		
Kristin Ørmen Johnsen	Conservative	Buskerud		
Per Olaf Lundteigen	Centre	Buskerud		
Jon Engen-Helgheim	Progress	Buskerud		
Masud Gharahkhani	Labour	Buskerud		
Arne Nævra	Socialist Left	Buskerud		
Runar Sjåstad	Labour	Finnmark		
Bengt Rune Strifeldt	Progress	Finnmark		
Ingalill Olsen	Labour	Finnmark		
Geir Adelsten Iversen	Centre	Finnmark		
Frank Bakke-Jensen	Conservative	Finnmark	Serving as Minister of Defence in Solberg's Cabinet since October 2017. Permanently represented by Marianne Haukland	
Anette Trettebergstuen	Labour	Hedmark		
Trygve Slagsvold Vedum	Centre	Hedmark		
Nils Kristen Sandtrøen	Labour	Hedmark		
Kristian Tonning Riise	Conservative	Hedmark		
Tor André Johnsen	Progress	Hedmark		
Emilie Enger Mehl	Centre	Hedmark		
Karin Andersen	Socialist Left	Hedmark		
Ove Trellevik	Conservative	Hordaland		
Magne Rommetveit	Labour	Hordaland		
Helge André Njåstad	Progress	Hordaland		
Peter Frølich	Conservative	Hordaland		
Jette F. Christensen	Labour	Hordaland		
Torill Eidsheim	Conservative	Hordaland		
Kjersti Toppe	Centre	Hordaland		
Silje Hjemdal	Progress	Hordaland		
Audun Lysbakken	Socialist Left	Hordaland		
Eigil Knutsen	Labour	Hordaland		
Tom-Christer Nilsen	Conservative	Hordaland		
Knut Arild Hareide	Christian Democratic	Hordaland	Serving as Minister of Transport and Communications since January 2020. Permanently represented by Torill Selsvold Nyborg.	
Erna Solberg	Conservative	Hordaland	Serving as Prime Minister of Norway since October 2013. Permanently represented by Liv Kari Eskeland.	
Ruth Grung	Labour	Hordaland		
Terje Breivik	Liberal	Hordaland		
Nils T. Bjørke	Centre	Hordaland		
Helge Orten	Conservative	Møre og Romsdal		
Sylvi Listhaug	Progress	Møre og Romsdal		
Else-May Norderhus	Labour	Møre og Romsdal		
Jenny Klinge	Centre	Møre og Romsdal		
Marianne Synnes Emblemsvåg	Conservative	Møre og Romsdal		
Jon Georg Dale	Progress	Møre og Romsdal		
Frederic Holen Bjørdal	Labour	Møre og Romsdal		
Vetle Wang Soleim	Conservative	Møre og Romsdal		
Steinar Reiten	Christian Democratic	Møre og Romsdal		
Eirik Sivertsen	Labour	Nordland		
Margunn Ebbesen	Conservative	Nordland		
Willfred Nordlund	Centre	Nordland		
Kjell-Børge Freiberg	Progress	Nordland		
Agnete Tjærandsen	Conservative	Nordland		
Åsunn Lyngedal	Labour	Nordland		
Jonny Finstad	Conservative	Nordland	Currently on leave. Represented by Elizabeth Åsjord Sire.	
Siv Mossleth	Centre	Nordland		
Hanne Dyveke Søttar	Progress	Nordland		
Mona Fagerås	Socialist Left	Nordland		
Rigmor Aasrud	Labour	Oppland		
Marit Knutsdatter Strand	Centre	Oppland		
Olemic Thommessen	Conservative	Oppland	President of the Parliament until March 2018	
Tore Hagebakken	Labour	Oppland		
Morten Ørsal Johansen	Progress	Oppland		
Bengt Fasteraune	Centre	Oppland	Replaced Ivar Odnes after his death in 2018.	
Ketil Kjenseth	Liberal	Oppland		
Jonas Gahr Støre	Labour	Oslo		
Michael Tetzschner	Conservative	Oslo		
Marianne Marthinsen	Labour	Oslo		
Heidi Nordby Lunde	Conservative	Oslo		
Siv Jensen	Progress	Oslo	Leader of the Progress Party since 2006	
Kari Elisabeth Kaski	Socialist Left	Oslo		
Trine Skei Grande	Liberal	Oslo		
Jan Bøhler	Centre	Oslo		
Mudassar Kapur	Conservative	Oslo		
Bjørnar Moxnes	Red	Oslo	Leader of the Red Party since 2012	
Une Bastholm	Green	Oslo		
Siri Gåsemyr Staalesen	Labour	Oslo		
Stefan Heggelund	Conservative	Oslo		
Christian Tybring-Gjedde	Progress	Oslo		
Espen Barth Eide	Labour	Oslo		
Petter Eide	Socialist Left	Oslo		
Ine Eriksen Søreide	Conservative	Oslo	Minister of Foreign Affairs since 2017. Permanently represented by Mathilde Tybring-Gjedde.	
Ola Elvestuen	Liberal	Oslo		
Nikolai Astrup	Christian Democratic	Oslo	Minister of Local Government and Modernisation since 2020. Permanently represented by Camilla Strandskog. Strandskog is currently on leave, being represented by Mats Kirkebirkeland.	
Sveinung Stensland	Conservative	Rogaland		
Hadia Tajik	Labour	Rogaland		
Solveig Horne	Progress	Rogaland		
Margret Hagerup	Conservative	Rogaland		
Torstein Tvedt Solberg	Labour	Rogaland		
Roy Steffensen	Progress	Rogaland		
Olaug Vervik Bollestad	Christian Democratic	Rogaland	Minister of Agriculture and Food since January 2019. Permanently represented by Geir Sigbjørn Toskedal.	
Bent Høie	Conservative	Rogaland	Minister of Health and Care Services since January 2020. Permanently represented by Aleksander Stokkebø.	
Geir Pollestad	Centre	Rogaland		
Hege Haukeland Liadal	Labour	Rogaland		
Tina Bru	Conservative	Rogaland	Minister of Petroleum and Energy since January 2020. Permanently represented by Aase Simonsen.	
Terje Halleland	Progress	Rogaland		
Geir Pollestad	Centre	Rogaland		
Øystein Langholm Hansen	Labour	Rogaland		
Solfrid Lerbrekk	Socialist Left	Rogaland		
Liv Signe Navarsete	Centre	Sogn og Fjordane		
Ingrid Heggø	Labour	Sogn og Fjordane		
Frida Melvær	Conservative	Sogn og Fjordane		
Tore Storehaug	Christian Democratic	Sogn og Fjordane		
Terje Aasland	Labour	Telemark		
Solveig Sundbø Abrahamsen	Conservative	Telemark		
Bård Hoksrud	Progress	Telemark		
Lene Vågslid	Labour	Telemark		
Åslaug Sem-Jacobsen	Centre	Telemark		
Geir Jørgen Bekkevold	Christian Democratic	Telemark		
Cecilie Myrseth	Labour	Troms		
Kent Gudmundsen	Conservative	Troms		
Per-Willy Amundsen	Progress	Troms		
Sandra Borch	Centre	Troms		
Martin Henriksen	Labour	Troms		
Torgeir Knag Fylkesnes	Socialist Left	Troms		
Ingvild Kjerkol	Labour	Nord-Trøndelag		
Marit Arnstad	Centre	Nord-Trøndelag		
Arild Stokkan-Grande	Labour	Nord-Trøndelag		
Elin Rodum Agdestein	Conservative	Nord-Trøndelag		
André Nikolai Skjelstad	Liberal	Nord-Trøndelag		
Trond Giske	Labour	Sør-Trøndelag		
Mari Holm Lønseth	Conservative	Sør-Trøndelag		
Eva Kristin Hansen	Labour	Sør-Trøndelag		
Sivert Bjørnstad	Progress	Sør-Trøndelag		
Heidi Greni	Centre	Sør-Trøndelag		
Linda Cathrine Hofstad Helleland	Conservative	Sør-Trøndelag	Minister of Districts and Digitalization since January 2020. Permanently represented by Guro Angell Gimse.	
Jorodd Asphjell	Labour	Sør-Trøndelag		
Lars Haltbrekken	Socialist Left	Sør-Trøndelag		
Kirsti Leirtrø	Labour	Sør-Trøndelag		
Jon Gunnes	Liberal	Sør-Trøndelag		
Kårstein Eidem Løvaas	Conservative	Vestfold		
Dag Terje Andersen	Labour	Vestfold		
Morten Stordalen	Progress	Vestfold		
Lene Westgaard-Halle	Conservative	Vestfold		
Maria Aasen-Svensrud	Labour	Vestfold		
Erlend Larsen	Conservative	Vestfold		
Carl-Erik Grimstad	Liberal	Vestfold		
Stein Erik Lauvås	Labour	Østfold		
Ingjerd Schou	Conservative	Østfold		
Ulf Leirstein	Independent	Østfold	Elected for the Progress Party but resigned in 2019.	
Elise Bjørnebekk-Waagen	Labour	Østfold		
Tage Pettersen	Conservative	Østfold		
Svein Roald Hansen	Labour	Østfold		
Ole André Myhrvold	Centre	Østfold		
Erlend Wiborg	Progress	Østfold		
Freddy André Øvstegård	Socialist Left	Østfold		
