= Republicanism in Norway =

Political movement to replace Norway's monarchy with a republic

Republicanism in Norway is a movement to replace the constitutional monarchy with a republican form of government. The country has always been ruled by a monarch and has never been a republic. Presently, the country has the King as the head of state and the prime minister as the head of government.

Since 1905 and the dissolution of the union with Sweden several republican movements and thoughts have arisen. Currently, the Norwegian Republican Association is the only non-partisan organisation campaigning to abolish the monarchy and make Norway a republic.

== History ==
The Kingdom of Norway has existed for 1,150 years. According to the Norwegian lexicon SNL, it is believed that the country was united as one kingdom by Harald Fairhair in 872. There was no political system or institutions in this kingdom. In 1380, the country went into a union with Denmark and was ruled under the Danish king for over four hundred years. In 1814, the union was dissolved, and Norway went into a personal union with Sweden. This union was dissolved in 1905 and Norway again became an independent country. Norway did not have a king of its own and the Norwegian Prime Minister Christian Michelsen suggested the Swedish Prince Carl to become the new Norwegian king. The country crowned Danish Prince Carl instead, who changed his name to Haakon and became King Haakon VII of Norway. Christian Michelsen was the Leader of the Liberal Party and had broad support as a republican, but he deemed it too radical to suggest transitioning the country into a republic.

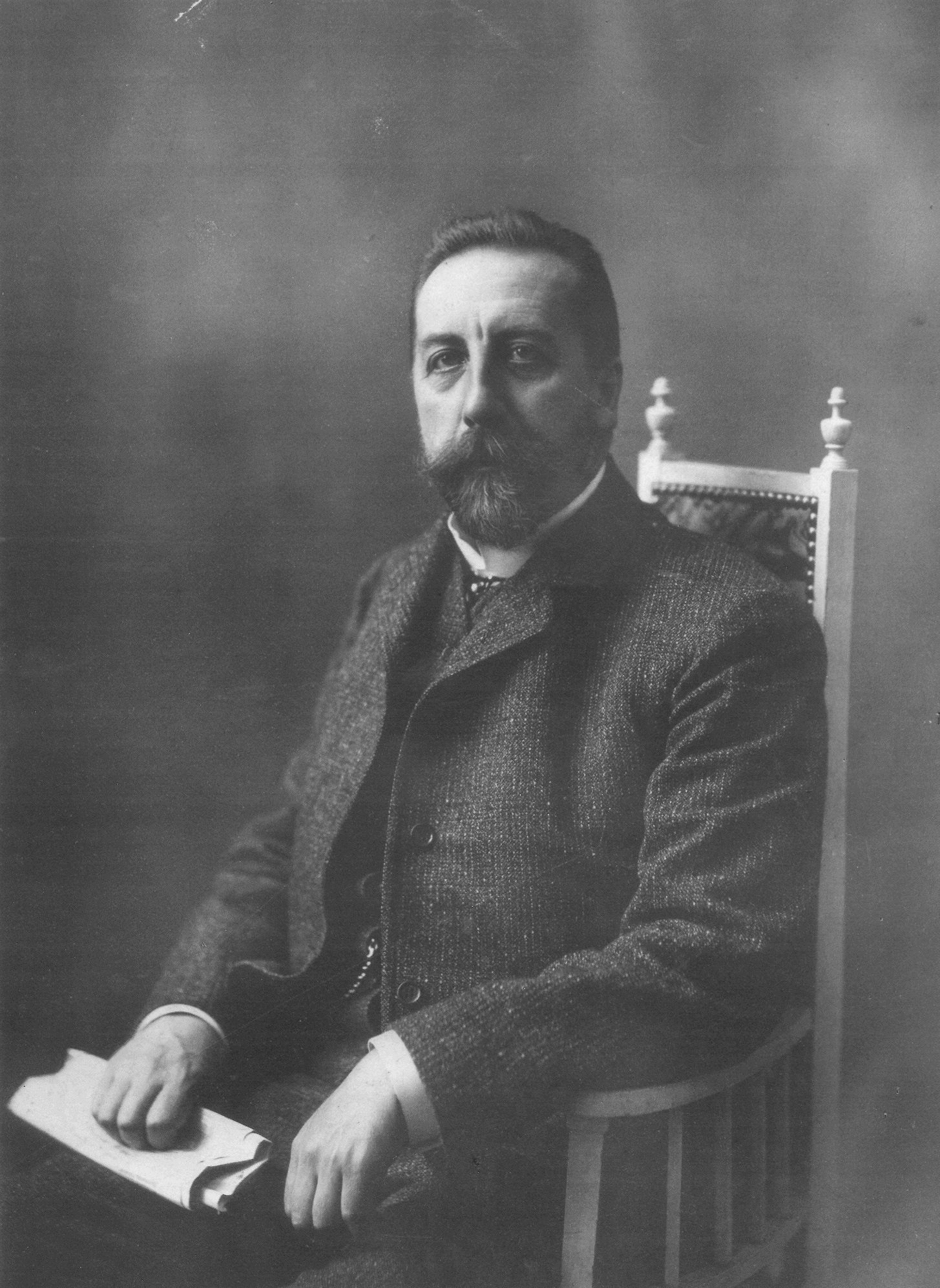
The Norwegian Prime Minister Christian Michelsen.

The thought of a republic had reached Norway after the dissolution of the union with Denmark almost one hundred years earlier. France had transitioned into a republic after Emperor Napoleon III was deposed in 1870 and Norwegian authors Bjørnstjerne Bjørnson and Arne Garborg voiced their opinions in support of a republic in the late-nineteenth century. The beginning of the dissolution of the union with Sweden at the end of the nineteenth century strengthened a distrust of the monarchy. The current monarch in Norway was from Sweden, and Members of Parliament voiced their discontent about the monarchy in 1905. A group of 44 "leading citizens of the day", some of them members of the Storting, signed a petition on 16 October 1905 to promote the republic and to demand a referendum on the future form of government. The dissolution of the union between Norway and Sweden happened in June 1905, three months before the republican petition. Christian Michelsen was important for the decision to resolve the union. He was a republican but wanted to keep the monarchy and wanted a king from either Sweden or Denmark. He told the Norwegian Parliament about his plans to ask Prince Carl of Sweden to become King of Norway. He did not tell anyone besides his Cabinet members about his plan to ask Prince Carl of Denmark to become the new Norwegian king. The Parliament did not vote against the offer to give the crown to Prince Carl of Sweden. King Oscar II of Sweden declined the offer from Norway and did not want his son to sit on the Norwegian throne. Michelsen contacted the Danish royal family, and Danish Prince Carl accepted the offer if the Norwegian government and people wanted him as king.

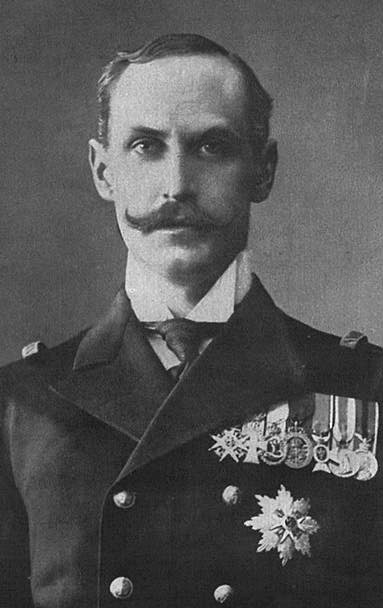
Prince Carl of Denmark after he changed his name to Haakon and became King Haakon VII of Norway.

In 1905, the Norwegian Parliament consisted of 117 representatives. The moderates from the Left Party had joined forces with the entire Conservative Party, and they were led by Prime Minister Michelsen. The Michelsen's Cabinet was republican but supported the Danish Prince Carl. The Prime Minister threatened to resign if the Danish prince was not voted as King of Norway. On 9 October 1905, ten men from the Liberal Party proposed a republic as a form of government. They gained more supporters and became 24 men in total. The group of 24 men were called the republicans (in Norwegian: venstrerepublikanerne). Another group of republicans in the Parliament consisted of five men from the Labour Party. Michelsen gained support in his mission to crown Prince Carl of Denmark as king of Norway. Michelsen met resistance from Parliament and from politicians within his own cabinet. Members of the Parliament that supported the republic argued that Norway had been fine without a king since the decision to exit the union with Sweden. Minister for Finance Gunnar Knudsen would rather resign than to go along with Michelsen's plan to give the crown to Prince Carl of Denmark. Prime Minister Michelsen wanted to avoid a referendum if possible. The monarchists in Parliament and the republicans that supported Michelsen and Danish Prince Carl were scared that Norway as a republic would pose as a threat to other European monarchies. The remaining republicans in Parliament did not share this view and suggested a referendum to settle the case. Left-winged organisations supported this proposal, and there were demonstrations from the people in Oslo. The monarchists did not see this as a threat.

The news of the republic versus monarchy debate reached Copenhagen. The Danish Foreign Affairs Minister Frederik Raben-Levetzau contacted Prime Minister Michelsen to verify that the Norwegian people supported the Danish Prince. The Swedish King Oscar II had warned the Danish prince about the Norwegians and the Danish prince's mother Crown Princess Louise warned him about taking the crown without the results of a referendum. Prince Carl of Denmark did not want to become king unless the people of Norway wanted him to. A referendum was held the on 12 and 13 November 1905. The majority voted for the monarchy and for Prince Carl. In total 69,264 voted for the republic and 259,563 voted for the monarchy. The opposition to the monarchy was strongest in the county of Telemark. There was a radical movement in Telemark that was anti-Danish and opposed to the monarchy. Telemark was the only county with several municipalities where the majority voted for the republic.

The Norwegian Republican Association (In Norwegian: Norge som republikk) was founded in December 2000. They are the only non-partisan organisation campaigning to abolish the monarchy and make Norway a republic.

== Public opinion ==
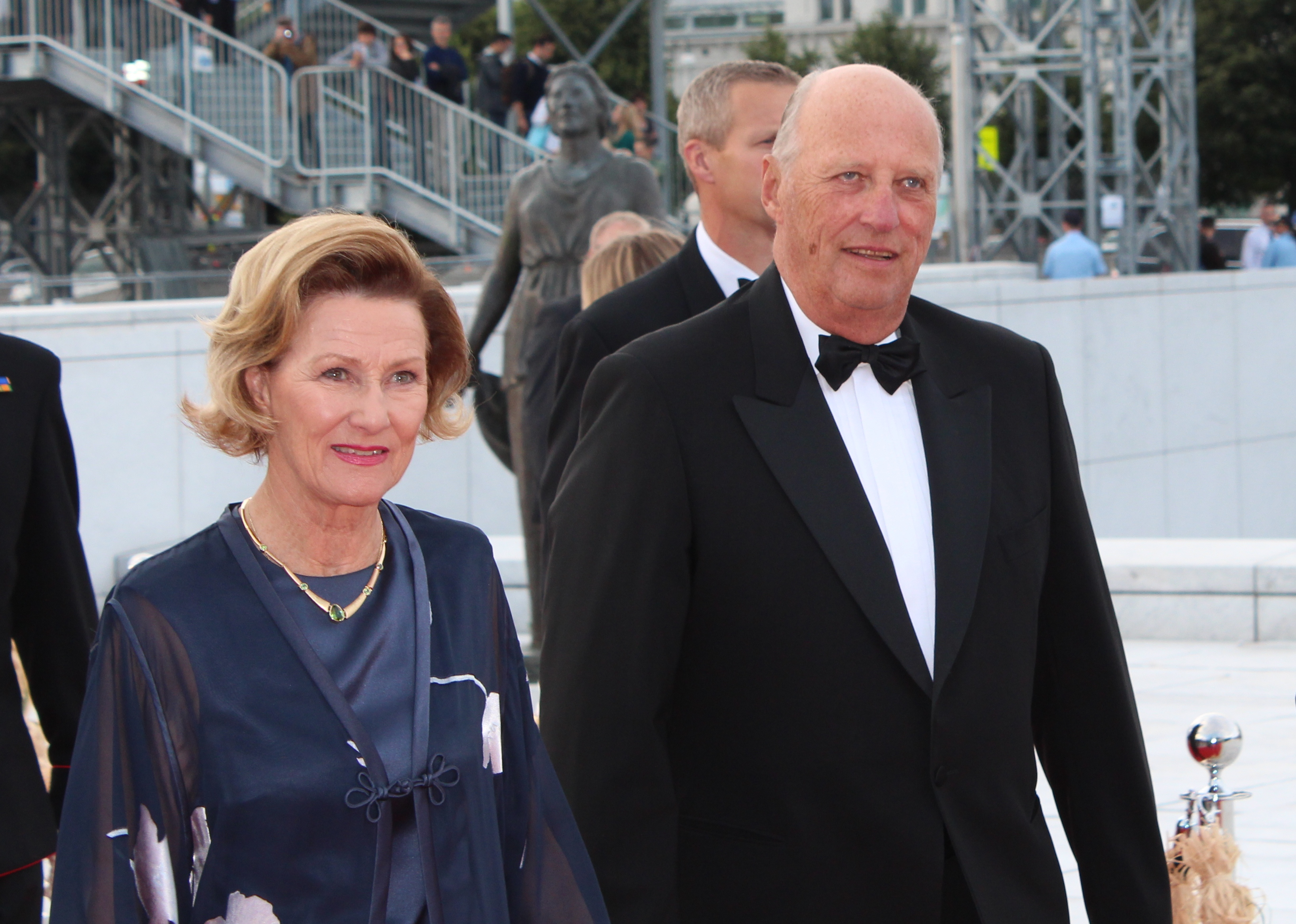
King Harald V and Queen Sonja at the premiere of the movie Kon-Tiki in Oslo.

In 2013 the news agency TV 2 asked the Norwegian people how they felt about the monarchy and about the individual monarchs. 91% of the people who were asked believed that King Harald was doing a good job as King of Norway and 80% believed that Queen Sonja was doing a good job as Queen of Norway. Most people that were asked believed that Queen Sonja is very important to King Harald in relation to counselling, advice and support. Additionally, 13% believed that the king should abdicate to let his son Crown Prince Haakon be crowned king before his father dies, and 75% believed that the king should not abdicate.

In more recent years, the monarchy and royal family has received criticism due to Princess Märtha Louise's continued use of her title as Princess of Norway for commercial reasons. The princess renounced the title "Her Royal Highness" in 2002, but as recently as May 2019 and July 2024 she has been accused of taking advantage of her royal title for marketing purposes.

Between 2017 and May 2024, popular support dropped from 81 to 73%, while it reached an all time low of between 54-66% in February 2026. Accusations of rape and the subsequent imprisonment of Crown Princess Mette-Marit's non-royal son, Marius Borg Høiby, combined with Mette-Marit's association with Jeffrey Epstein and scandals involving the King's son-in-law, conspiracy theorist, convicted felon and accused sex offender Durek Verrett, have been cited as reasons for a "decimation of the Norwegian royal family's reputation," leading to debate about democratic constitutional reforms to abolish hereditary positions and a doubling of membership in the Norwegian Republican Association to over 700 members.

== Proposals for change ==
In 2012 Hallgeir H. Langeland, Snorre Serigstad Valen, Eirin Sund, Truls Wickholm, Marianne Marthinsen and Jette F. Christensen proposed a constitutional change. The constitutional change they wanted was the introduction of republicanism in Norway. In the constitutional bill, they stated that no positions of power should be inherited, and therefore they believed that the monarchy was not suitable in a democratic country like Norway. The bill, though garnering support, did not pass.

=== Proposal process ===
1. The Parliament would ask the executive part of the government to come up with alternatives to how the country would become a republic. They would have to illuminate the main factors of the new republican state in a proposal.
2. The executive would then have to decide on the main factors that would constitute the new republic and approve these.
3. The constitutional change to adopt a republican form of government would then be taken into effect from 1 January the following year. This would occur subsequent to a referendum.

=== Poll from 2019 ===
In January 2019 the members of the Storting (Parliament) voted for or against the monarchy and the king. In total, 20% of Parliament voted against the monarchy and for the republic (36 members). Below is a list of the members that voted for a republic.

Members of the Storting who voted for a republic in January 2019
Political party	Member names
Labour Party	Marianne Marthinsen, Torstein Tvedt Solberg, Martin Henriksen, Kristian Torve, Jorodd Asphjell, Kirsti Leirtrø, Julia Wong, Åsmund Aurkrust, Anette Trettebergstuen, Eirik Sivertsen, Åsunn Lyngedal, Tuva Moflag, Lise Christoffersen, Ruth Grung
Conservative Party	Camilla Strandskog, Heidi Nordby Lunde
Socialist Left Party	Freddy Andre Øvstegård, Kari Elisabeth Kaski, Olivia Corso Salles, Solfrid Lerbekk, Torgeir Knag Fylkesnes, Lars Haltbrekken, Arne Nævra, Karin Andersen, Audun Lysbakken, Mona Fagerås, Sheida Sangtarash
Liberal Party	Guri Melby, Carl-Erik Grimstad, Grunde Almeland, Jon Gunnes, Terje Breivik, Ketil Kjenseth
Progress Party	Sivert Bjørnstad
Green Party	Une Bastholm
Red Party	Bjørnar Moxnes

== Political party positions ==
=== Labour Party ===
In 2016 the members of Parliament voted for or against a change in what form of government Norway should have. The Deputy Leader of the Labour Party, Hadia Tajik voted for the republic. The Leader of the party, Jonas Gahr Støre, said to the newspaper VG that the members of the party had always been allowed to vote in accordance with their own opinions on certain matters, even if this contradicted with the party's general opinion. The leader of the party goes on to state, in the interview, that he supports the monarchy and the party supports the monarchy even though several younger members believe something different.

In 2019 the members of Parliament voted again, and Støre remarked that the royal family still has support from the Labour Party. Once again he stated that the members of the party can vote as they like in relation to this question and that less of one-third of the party voted for a republic shows that the party is still supporting the royal family and a monarchy as a form of government.

=== Socialist Left Party ===
The Socialist Left Party has included in the political party agenda online that they wish to remove the monarchy. They want Norway to become a republic and believe that no position of power should be inherited.

=== Liberal Party ===
The Liberal Party believe that no position of power should be inherited and that a potential change in form of government from monarchy to republic will have to be decided by the people through a referendum.

=== Centre Party ===
The Centre Party has stated in its party platform that the monarchy is an important unifying and cultural symbol for Norway, and that the party thereby supports the monarchy's retention.

=== Conservative Party ===
The Conservative Party member Bente Stein Mathisen said to news agency TV 2 in 2019 that the Conservative Party believes in tradition and institutions that still work. They see no reason to replace the monarchy with a republic.

=== Christian Democratic Party ===
Like the Conservative Party, the Christian Democratic Party wants to protect the monarchy. They believe that the monarchy still has a beneficial value to the country and see no reason to abolish it.

=== Red Party ===
The Red Party believes that the monarchy is undemocratic. The party wants Norway to become a republic.
