= Kari Elisabeth Kaski =

Norwegian politician

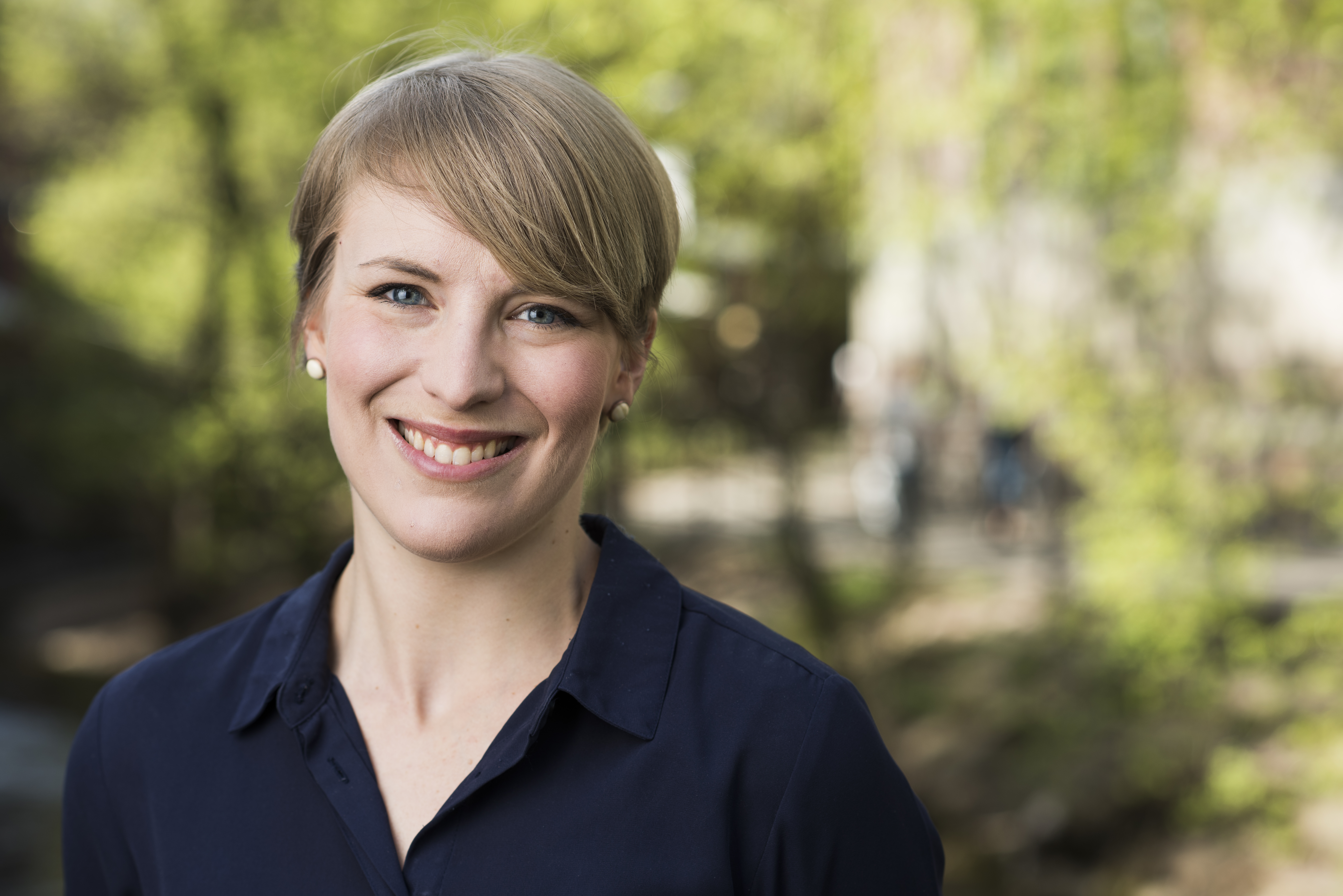
- Kaski in 2017

Second Vice Chair of the Standing Committee on Finance and Economic Affairs
- In office 21 October 2021 – 30 September 2025
- Leader: Eigil Knutsen; Tuva Moflag
- Preceded by: Hans Andreas Limi

Member of the Storting
- In office 1 October 2017 – 30 September 2025
- Constituency: Oslo

Personal details
- Born: 12 July 1987 (age 39) Kirkenes, Finnmark, Norway
- Party: Socialist Left
- Spouse: Ola Wolff Elvevold
- Children: 2 (1 deceased)
- Education: BI Norwegian Business School; University of Oslo; University of Burgundy
- Occupation: Politician

Kari Elisabeth Kaski (born 12 July 1987) is a Norwegian politician. A member of the Socialist Left Party (SV), she was a member of the Storting for Oslo between 2017 and 2025, and the second vice chair of the Standing Committee on Finance and Economic Affairs between 2021 and 2025.

== Personal life and education ==
Born in Kirkenes, Kaski studied at the BI Norwegian Business School, the University of Oslo, and the University of Burgundy, albeit without completion of a full degree.

She is the sister of Ragnhild Kaski, a former general secretary of the Workers' Youth League.

She is married to fellow party member Ola Wolff Elvevold, with whom she has one child. She was originally going to give birth to twins but one died before it was born.

== Political career ==
=== Party politics ===
Kaski is currently the party's spokesperson on finance.

She was the party's general secretary from 2015 to 2017. She then became a member of the party's Working Committee.

She and Torgeir Knag Fylkesnes were the two candidates for the Second Deputy leadership at the party's 2019 convention after Snorre Valen had announced that he would be stepping down. Fylkesnes won with 108 votes against Kaski's 100. After her loss, she criticised the leadership for not having a strong environmental profile.

After Audun Lysbakken announced that he would not be seeking re-election as leader, Kaski was floated as a possible contender to succeed him, alongside Kirsti Bergstø and Torgeir Knag Fylkesnes. She was endorsed by the party's county chapters in Viken, Vestfold and Telemark and Nordland. Aftenposten also reported that it was likely for the Socialist Youth to endorse her, as they had done so before. However, on 2 January 2023, Kaski announced that she wouldn't be seeking the leadership, citing family reasons.

=== Parliament ===
Kaski was elected to the Storting in the 2017 election. She won re-election in 2021. In addition, she became the second deputy chair of the Standing Committee on Finance and Economic Affairs.

In her capacity as the party's spokesperson on finance, she helped to negotiate with the government parties, Labour and Centre Party, on the revised state budget for 2022.

In 2020 she was one of the signatories of the "Call for Inclusive Feminism," a document which led to the establishment of the Initiative for Inclusive Feminism.

In April 2024, she announced that she wouldn't be seeking re-election at the 2025 election.
