= Unneland =

Unneland is a surname. Notable people with the surname include:

- Andreas Sjalg Unneland (born 1994), Norwegian politician
- Frode Unneland (born 1967), Norwegian musician
