= Torve =

Torve is a Norwegian surname. Notable people with the surname include:

- Kelvin Torve (born 1960), American baseball player and coach
- Kristian Torve (born 1993), Norwegian politician
- Tove-Lise Torve (born 1964), Norwegian politician

== See also ==
- Tõrve, village in Põltsamaa Parish, Jõgeva County, Estonia
- Tore (given name)
