= Kyrre Lekve =

Norwegian biologist and politician

Kyrre Lekve (born 11 March 1968) is a Norwegian biologist and politician for the Socialist Left Party.

He finished his secondary education in 1988, and minored in political science in 1991. He was also a journalist in Akershus Amtstidende and Ny Tid between 1988 and 1992. He later took his education in biology at the University of Oslo, graduating with the cand.scient. in 1997 and dr.scient. degree in 2001. From 2001 to 2004 he was a post.doc. researcher at the Centre for Ecological and Evolutionary Synthesis.

From 1992 to 1994 he chaired Socialist Youth, the youth wing of the Socialist Left Party. From 1995 to 1997 he was a central board member of the party, chairing the committee on foreign policy.

He was hired as an adviser in Abelia in 2004, but became involved in politics again in 2007. He was appointed as a political adviser in the Ministry of Education and Research, as a part of Stoltenberg's Second Cabinet. From October 2009 to May 2012 he served as a State Secretary in the same ministry. After resigning he was hired in the Research Council of Norway, but already in November the same year he became assisting director of Nordic Institute for Studies in Innovation, Research and Education (NIFU).

Party political offices
Preceded by Lisbet Rugtvedt	Leader of the Socialist Youth; 1992–1994	Succeeded by Andreas Tjernshaugen
