= Wolfgang Wee =

Norwegian podcast host

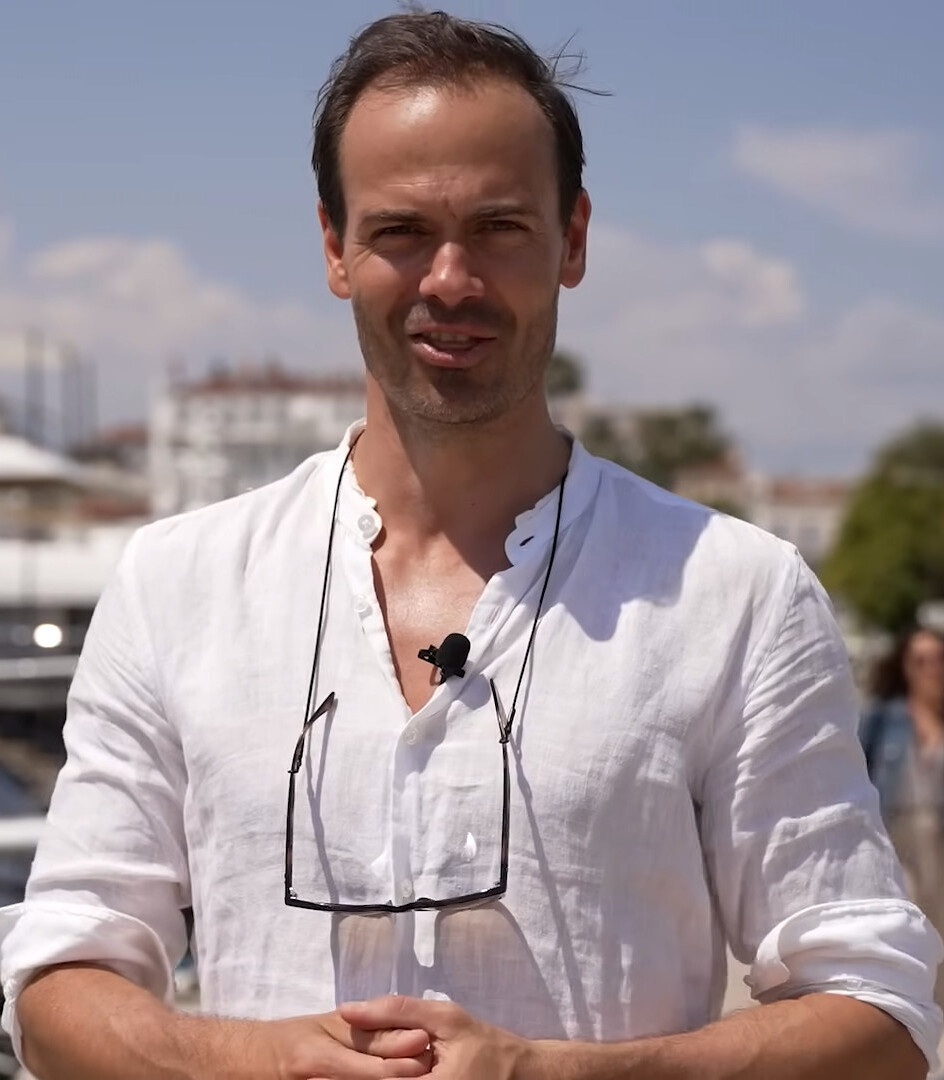
- Wee in 2023
- Born: 3 January 1982 (age 44)

Wolfgang Wee (born 1982) is a Norwegian podcast host, former radio presenter at NRK, and music producer and DJ. He hosts the weekly podcast Wolfgang Wee Uncut, which has become one of Norway's most popular. The podcast is based on unedited conversations where guests are allowed to talk freely about politics, society, nutrition, and other topics. The format and Wee himself have garnered both support and criticism.

== Background ==
Wee is from Høvik outside Oslo and attended Valler Upper Secondary School.

== by:larm 2003 ==
In 2003, he played at the music festival by:Larm after submitting a demo as a joke; the music recording he submitted was accepted, and Wee subsequently had to start a band in order to perform. Criticism was subsequently leveled against Wee's selection for the festival program.

== Professional life ==
=== NRK ===
In 2004, Wee was hired as a music producer at NRK P3 and NRK mP3. In 2009, he became acting music director at NRK Radio. From 2017, he was a program host at NRK Klasisk for a radio program about film music. He hosted the NRK programs Wolfgang Wee, Lt. Wee show until December 2019 and Wolfgang Wee's summer show in 2018.

=== Podcast ===
In March 2019, Wee started the weekly podcast Wolfgang Wee Uncut . In this podcast, he interviews people about culture, politics, and society, most often with men who are known from other media coverage and academia. The podcast has been compared to The Joe Rogan Experience. Like Rogan's podcast, the conversations are completely unedited and the guests are allowed to speak freely. The format has met with both support and criticism.

Wee left NRK in the summer of 2022 to focus full-time on the podcast he started in 2019. In December 2022, the Norwegian online magazine Subjekt gave its cultural award "Subjekt of the Year" to Wee, for his work with the podcast Wolfgang Wee Uncut. WWU was among the most popular Norwegian podcasts on Spotify in 2023.

In the spring of 2025, Wee received criticism from commentators in Nettavisen and Aftenposten for allegedly spreading Russian propaganda through his podcast, after claiming that Ukrainian President Volodymyr Zelenskyj has a cocaine problem. In May 2025, Wee and a guest received criticism after casting doubt on chemotherapy in a podcast, something the Norwegian Cancer Society and patients strongly warned against.
