= Freddy André Øvstegård =

Norwegian politician (born 1994)

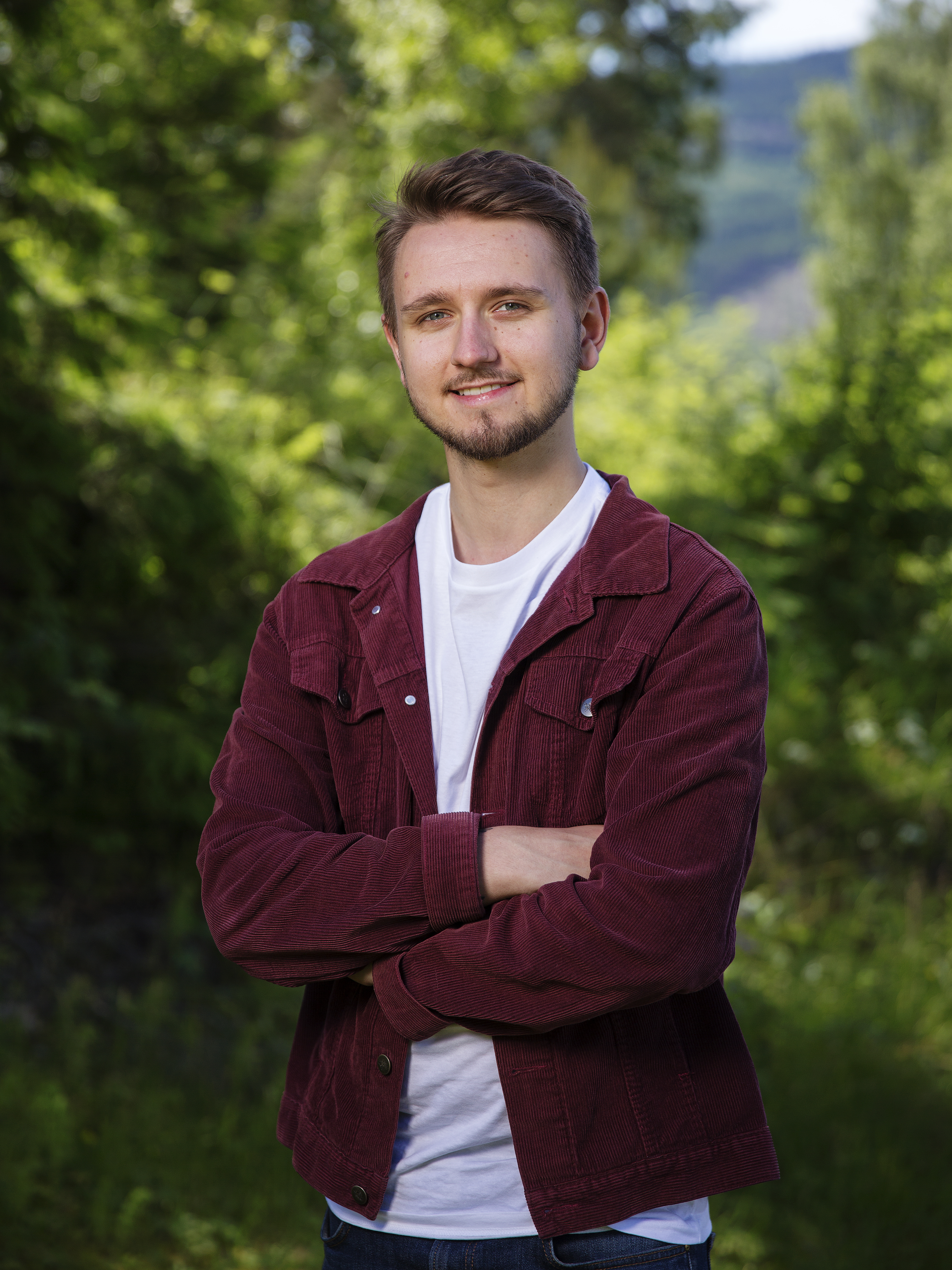
- Øvstegård in 2017

Chair of the Standing Committee on Labour and Social Affairs
- In office 2 May 2023 – 30 September 2025
- First Deputy: Per Olaf Lundteigen
- Second Deputy: Tuva Moflag; Bjørnar Skjæran; Per Vidar Kjølmoen
- Preceded by: Kirsti Bergstø
- Succeeded by: Marian Hussein

Member of the Storting
- In office 1 October 2017 – 30 September 2025
- Constituency: Østfold

Personal details
- Born: 20 December 1994 (age 31) Sarpsborg, Østfold, Norway
- Party: Socialist Left
- Occupation: Politician

Freddy André Øvstegård (born 20 December 1994) is a Norwegian politician who served as a member of the Storting for Østfold between 2017 and 2025.

== Political career ==
=== Parliament ===
He was elected to the Norwegian parliament, the Storting, at the 2017 election and was re-elected in 2021. He announced in August 2024 that he wouldn't seek re-election at the 2025 election.

He was selected to be the new chair of the Standing Committee on Labour and Social Affairs following former chair Kirsti Bergstø becoming new party leader of the Socialist Left Party. Øvstegård remained as chair for the rest of the Storting term.
