= Gina Barstad =

Norwegian politician

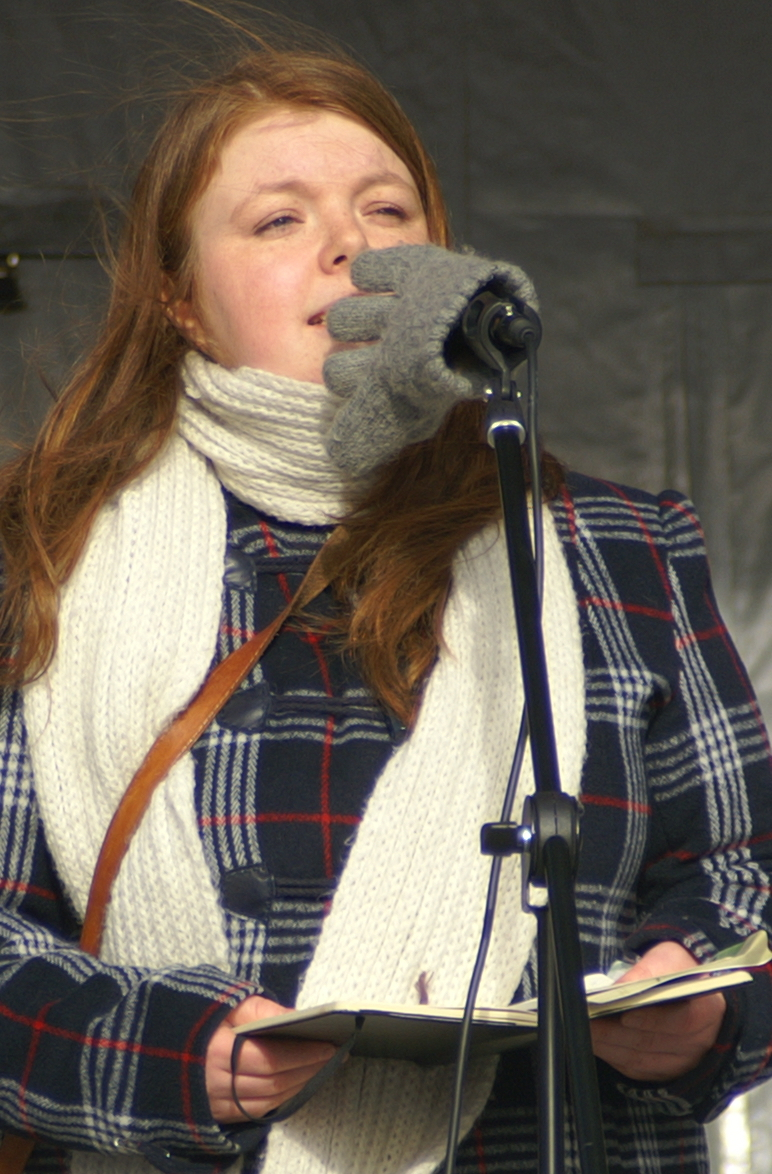
Gina Barstad (2009)

Gina Knutson Barstad (born 28 April 1986) is a Norwegian politician for the Socialist Left Party.

In the 2009 parliamentary election, Barstad who resides in Bergen was nominated as the Socialist Left's second candidate in Hordaland, behind Audun Lysbakken. Although the Socialist Left only received one representative in Hordaland, Lysbakken was picked as new Minister of Children and Equality in the Stoltenberg Cabinet, so Barstad met in parliament as a fixed deputy member until Lysbakkens resignment from the cabinet and return to parliament in March 2012. She was one of the youngest representatives in Parliament.

Prior to her entry into Parliament, Barstad was a deputy member of Bergen city council and in charge of the Socialist Left's economy. Barstad's main issue is equal pay, but she has also campaigned on environmental issues and for construction of high-speed rail in Norway. Apart from politics, Barstad is a student of French.

Her sister, Monika Ryste Barstad is also active in politics, though she represents the Progress Party in Ørsta Municipality. Despite the political differences, they remain close.
