= Valler Upper Secondary School =

Coordinates: 59.9013°N 10.5273°E

- Valler videregående skole

Location
- Brynsveien 46; Sandvika; Norway

Information
- School type: Public secondary school
- Motto: Heart and will
- Founded: 1888
- Principal: Berit Hetland
- Staff: 70
- Grades: 11–13
- Age range: 16–19
- Enrollment: 590
- Classes offered: General education
- Language: Norwegian
- Campus: Suburban
- Website: www.valler.vgs.no

Valler videregående skole (The Valler Upper Secondary School) is an upper secondary school located in Sandvika near Oslo, Norway.

The school's motto is the Norwegian phrase Hjerte og ånd, vilje og ansvar ("Heart and spirit, will and responsibility").

== History ==
The school dates back to 1888 and was established under the name Bærum Middelskole. The classes were taught at Valler farm during the first years, but was later moved to Sandvika. In 1939 the school moved to its current location, and the building was expanded in 1998.

== Programs ==
Valler Upper Secondary School offers one program, namely study specialized education programs. Within the program, students may specialize in three subprograms: science, language and social science, and visual arts.

== Notable alumni ==
- Paul Chaffey (1965-) – politician
- Harald Eia (1966-) – comedian
- Eirik Grude Flekkøy (1963-) – professor of physics
- Unni Lindell (1957-) – author
- Wolfgang Wee (1982-) – politician
- Andreas "Tix" Haukeland (1993-) – musician

== Notable teachers ==
- Simen Agdestein (1967-) – chess grandmaster and retired footballer
- Jostein Gaarder (1952-) – author
- Borghild Tenden (1951-) – politician
- Brage Sandmoen (1967-) – football referee
