= Paul Chaffey =

Norwegian businessperson and politician

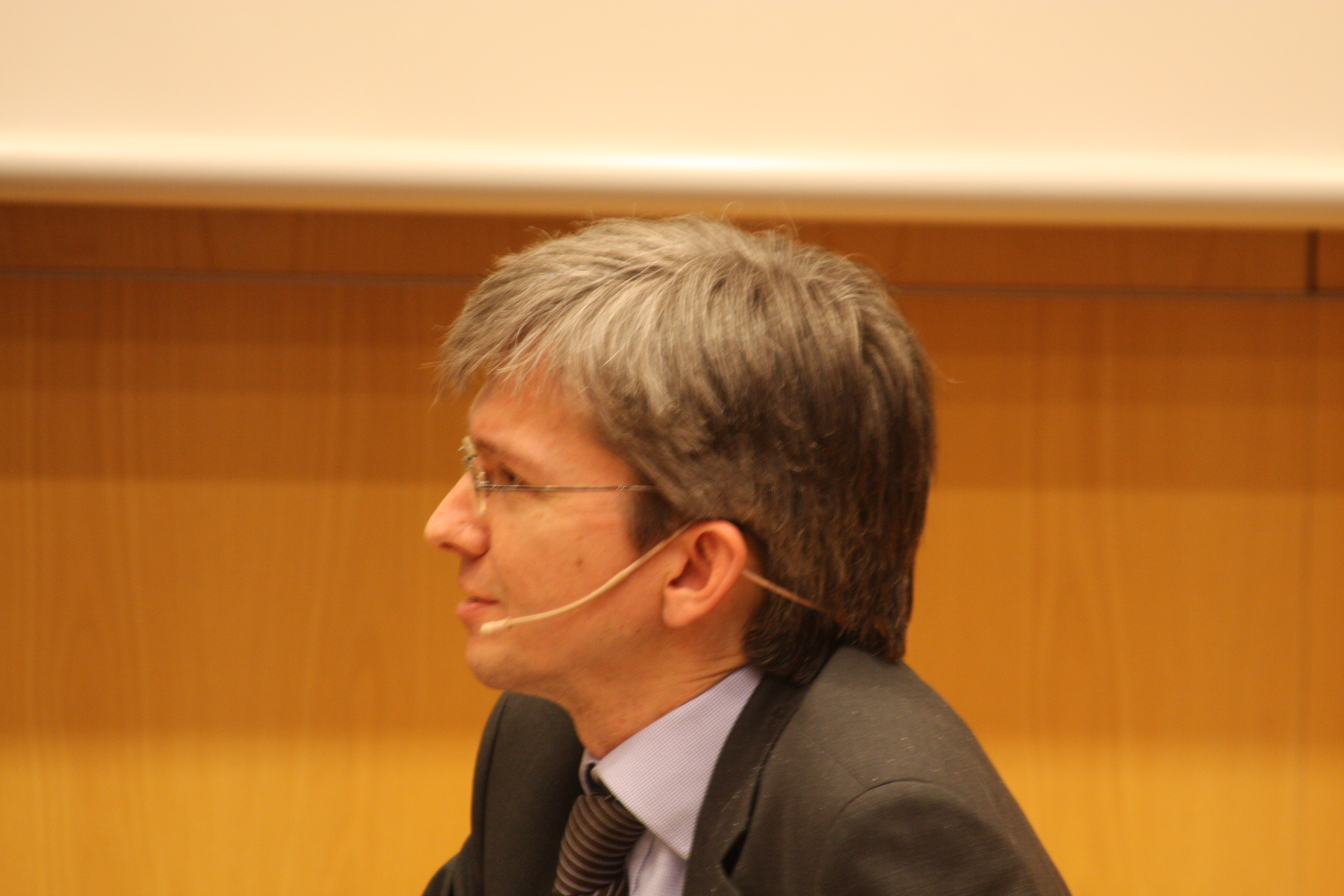
Paul Chaffey.

Paul André Chaffey (born 10 July 1965) is a Norwegian businessperson and politician, who represented the Socialist Left Party until 1997. He is now State Secretary to Minister of Local Government Jan Tore Sanner, and a supporter of the Conservative Party since 2000.

He was born in Oslo as a son of university lecturer Patrick Nigel Chaffey (1938–2006) and advisor Arnhild Mæhle (born 1945). He grew up in Bærum, and finished secondary school at Valler Upper Secondary School in 1984. At the University of Oslo he minored in political science in 1985–1986 before minoring in history in 1988–1989. He became involved in the Socialist Youth at a young age, and worked as their county secretary in Oslo from 1984 to 1985. From 1986 to 1988 he was the organizational secretary of the nationwide organization. He was a board member in Bærum from 1983 to 1984, in Akershus from 1984 to 1985 and then nationwide from 1985 to 1990. From 1988 to 1990 he led the organization. From 1986 to 1989 he was a member of the national board and central committee of the Socialist Left Party. He released two books in this period: Lik rett til utdanning in 1986 and Grønn framtid?: vår miljøpolitiske utfordring in 1989.

He was elected as a member of the Parliament of Norway in 1989 and 1993, representing the constituency Akershus. In the first term he was a member of the Standing Committee on Foreign and Constitutional Affairs and the Enlarged Committee on Foreign and Constitutional Affairs. In the second term he was the secretary of the Standing Committee on Energy and the Environment.

In 1997 he left politics, and was hired as an advisor in Statoil. After a short time as director of occupational safety and health, strategy and communications in 1999, he was the director of marketing from 1999 to 2001. In 2001 he was hired as managing director of Abelia, an employers' organisation organized under the national Confederation of Norwegian Enterprise. He has also been chair of the Norwegian Institute of International Affairs from 2002 to 2005, a board member of Europaprogrammet from 1990 to 1997 and of the University of Oslo.

In line with his change of career, Chaffey has been known for denouncing his former connections to the socialist movement. He has stated that he voted Labour in 1997, the very same year that he concluded his parliamentary representation for the Socialist Left Party, and in the 2000s he began voting Conservative. In 2008 he explained his move to the right to have been as he realized "that the market economy works", and even spoke at the national conference of the Progress Party where he praised its members.

Party political offices
Preceded by Raymond Johansen	Leader of the Socialist Youth; 1988–1990	Succeeded by Lisbet Rugtvedt
