= Morten Steenstrup =

Norwegian barrister and politician (1953–2025)

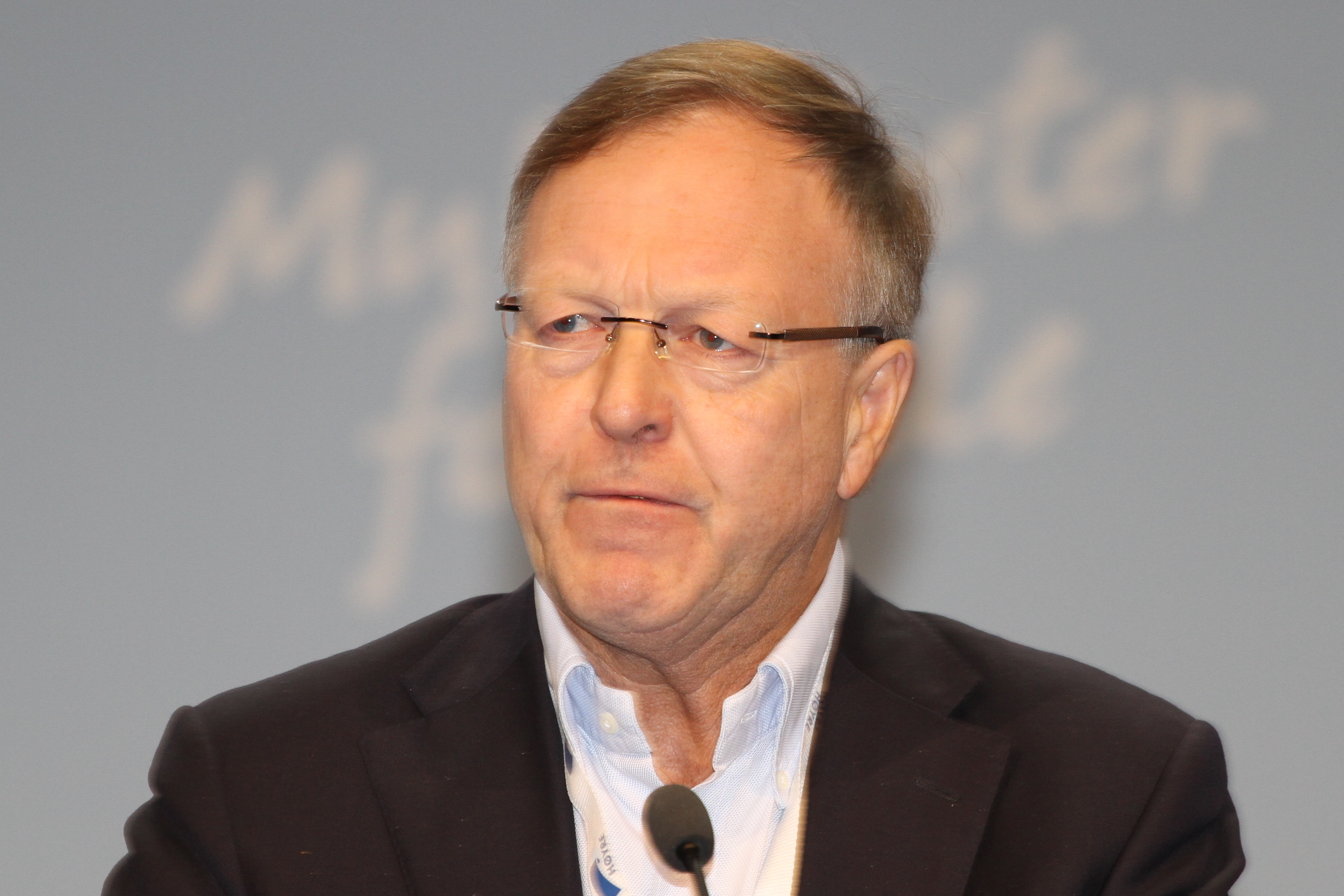
- Steenstrup in 2017

Leader of the Oslo Conservative Party
- In office 22 January 2022 – 27 January 2024
- Deputy: Merete Agerbak-Jensen
- Preceded by: Heidi Nordby Lunde
- Succeeded by: Mudassar Kapur

Member of the Storting
- In office 1 October 1981 – 30 September 1989
- Deputy: Ellen Gjerpe Hansen (1985–1986)
- Constituency: Vestfold

Deputy Member of the Storting
- In office 1 October 1977 – 30 September 1981
- Constituency: Vestfold

Personal details
- Born: 4 April 1953 Tønsberg, Vestfold, Norway
- Died: 22 May 2025 (aged 72) Nordstrand, Oslo, Norway
- Party: Conservative
- Occupation: Barrister; Politician

Morten Steenstrup (4 April 1953 – 22 May 2025) was a Norwegian barrister and politician. A member of the Conservative Party, Stenstrup served as a member of the Storting for Vestfold from 1981 to 1989, having previously served as a deputy member from 1977 to 1981. He also served as a state secretary in the Second Willoch cabinet from 1985 to 1986 and was most recently the leader of the Oslo Conservative Party from 2022 to 2024.

== Life and career ==
Steenstrup was born in Tønsberg on 4 April 1953, to Petter Chr. Steenstrup and Kari Bertnes. He was elected representative to the Storting for the period 1981–1985 for the Conservative Party, and reelected for the period 1985–1989.

On 1 December 2021, he was designated as the new leader of the Oslo Conservatives after Heidi Nordby Lunde announced in October that she wouldn't be seeking re-election. He was formally elected on 22 January 2022. After leading the Oslo Conservatives to victory in the 2023 local elections, Steenstrup announced a week later that he wouldn't be seeking re-election as leader. He stated that he had aimed to secure his party an electoral victory before the end of his term, which he did ultimately accomplish. He was succeeded by Mudassar Kapur at the next annual meeting on 27 January 2024.

Steenstrup died from cancer at his home in the Nordstrand area of Oslo, on 22 May 2025, at the age of 72.
