= Kirsti Bergstø =

Norwegian politician

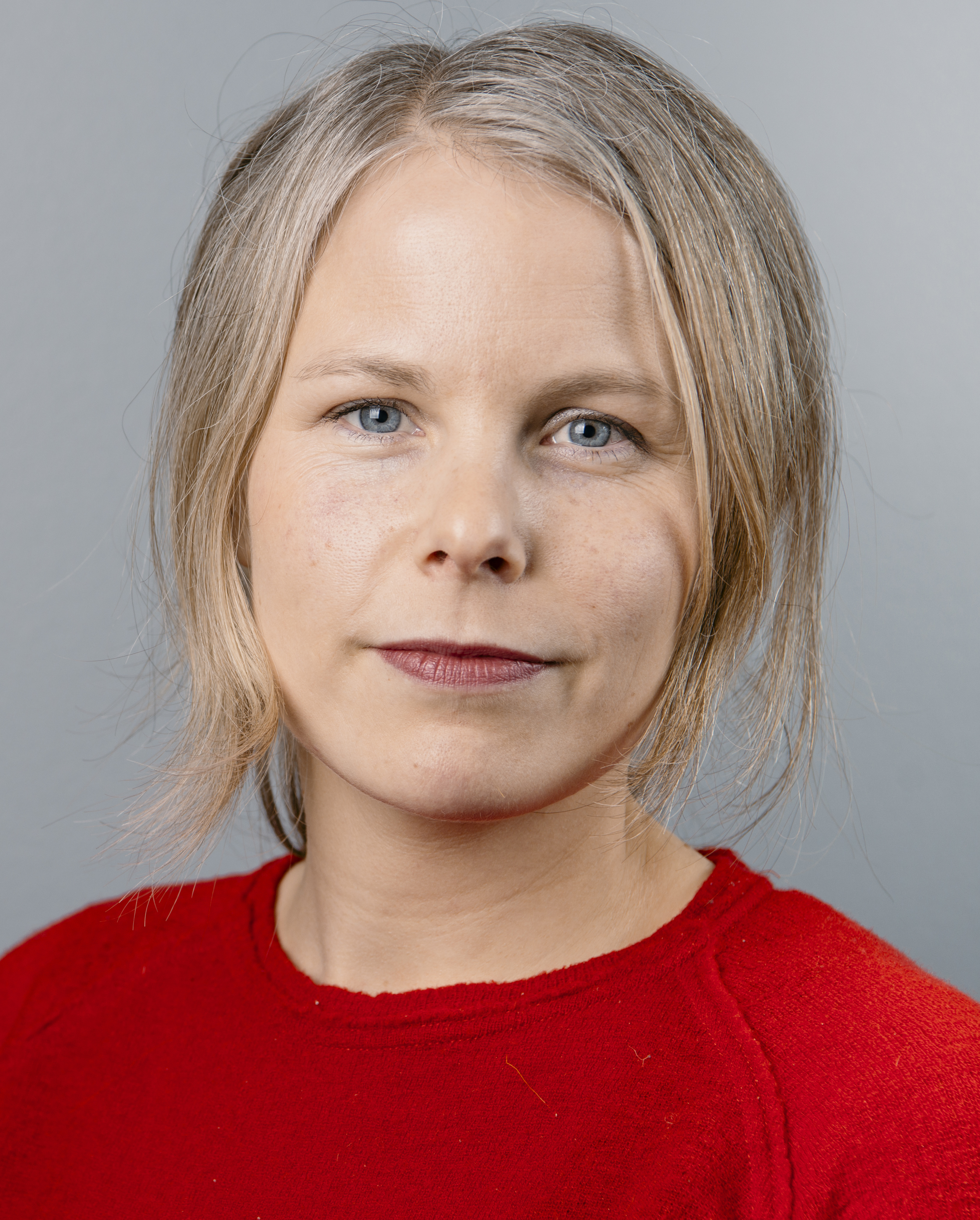
- Bergstø in 2017

Leader of the Socialist Left Party
- Incumbent
- Assumed office 18 March 2023
- First Deputy: Marian Hussein
- Second Deputy: Torgeir Knag Fylkesnes; Lars Haltbrekken
- Preceded by: Audun Lysbakken

Chair of the Standing Committee on Labour and Social Affairs
- In office 21 October 2021 – 2 May 2023
- First Deputy: Per Olaf Lundteigen
- Second Deputy: Tuva Moflag
- Preceded by: Erlend Wiborg
- Succeeded by: Freddy André Øvstegård

First Deputy Leader of the Socialist Left Party
- In office 18 March 2017 – 18 March 2023
- Leader: Audun Lysbakken
- Preceded by: Oddny Irene Miljeteig
- Succeeded by: Marian Hussein

Member of the Storting
- Incumbent
- Assumed office 1 October 2021
- Constituency: Akershus
- In office 1 October 2013 – 30 September 2017
- Constituency: Finnmark

Deputy Member of the Storting
- In office 1 October 2005 – 30 September 2009
- Constituency: Finnmark

Personal details
- Born: 1 July 1981 (age 44) Rana Municipality, Nordland, Norway
- Political party: Socialist Left
- Domestic partner: Atle
- Children: 1

Kirsti Bergstø (born 1 July 1981) is a Norwegian politician serving as the leader of the Socialist Left Party since March 2023. She previously served as one of the party's deputy leaders from 2017 to 2023.

== Personal life ==
Bergstø was born in Rana Municipality in Nordland. She is the daughter of Harald Bergstø who worked as a municipal fireman and Erna Bergstø who worked for the Norwegian welfare office.

She has a partner, and a son.

== Political career ==
=== Youth wing ===
She is the former leader of the Socialist Youth, the youth wing of the Socialist Left Party, and held this position between 2006 and 2008.

=== Parliament ===
She served as a deputy representative to the Storting from Finnmark from 2005 to 2009. She was a deputy member of Finnmark county council from 1999 to 2003. From 2010 to 2012 she was a State Secretary in the Ministry of Children, Equality and Social Inclusion, but she and Audun Lysbakken had to step down due to a political financing controversy regarding the appropriation of funds to organisations.

She was a member of the Storting from Finnmark from 2013 to 2017, and again, from Akershus since 2021. In addition, she became the chair of the Standing Committee on Labour and Social Affairs, a position she held until 2023.

=== Party deputy leader ===
She was elected the party's deputy leader on 18 March 2017.

From April to September 2022, she was acting party leader while Audun Lysbakken was on parental leave.

=== Party leader ===
Following Lysbakken's announced departure as leader, Bergstø was floated as a possible contender to succeed him, alongside Torgeir Knag Fylkesnes and Kari Elisabeth Kaski. Bergstø officially declared her candidacy on 9 December. The party election committee unanimously designated her as party leader on 1 February 2023. She was formally elected leader on 18 March. She was re-elected at the 2025 party convention along with deputy leader Marian Hussein and with Lars Haltbrekken replacing outgoing deputy leader Torgeir Knag Fylkesnes.

Political offices
Preceded by Erlend Wiborg	Chair of the Standing Committee on Labour and Social Affairs; 2021–2023	Succeeded by Freddy André Øvstegård
Party political offices
Preceded by Audun Herning	Leader of the Socialist Youth; 2006–2008	Succeeded by Mali Steiro Tronsmoen
Preceded by Oddny Irene Miljeteig	First Deputy Leader of the Socialist Left Party; 2017–2023	Succeeded by Marian Abdi Hussein
Preceded by Audun Lysbakken	Leader of the Socialist Left Party; 2023–present	Incumbent
