= Marian Abdi Hussein =

Norwegian politician

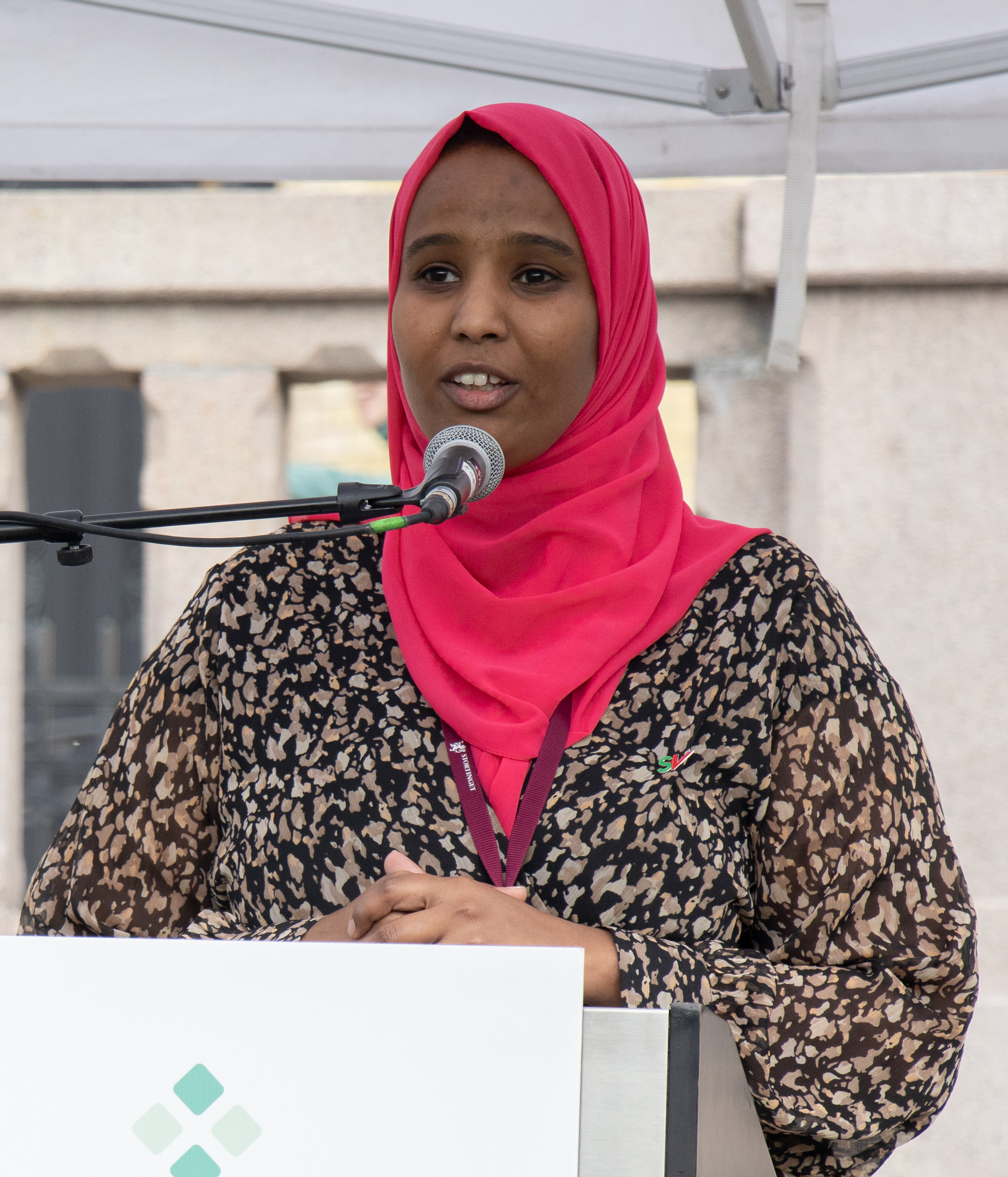
- Hussein in 2022

First Deputy Leader of the Socialist Left Party
- Incumbent
- Assumed office 18 March 2023
- Leader: Kirsti Bergstø
- Preceded by: Kirsti Bergstø

Member of the Storting
- Incumbent
- Assumed office 1 October 2021
- Constituency: Oslo

Deputy Member of the Storting
- In office 1 October 2017 – 30 September 2021
- Constituency: Oslo

Personal details
- Born: 24 July 1986 (age 40) Somalia
- Party: Socialist Left
- Occupation: Politician; Social worker

Marian Abdi Hussein (born 24 July 1986) is a Somalia-born Norwegian politician from the Socialist Left Party. She has served as a member of parliament for Oslo since 2021, having previously been a deputy member for the same constituency between 2017 and 2021. She has also served as one of the party's deputy leaders since 2023.

== Political career ==
=== Parliament ===
Hussein was deputy representative to the Storting for the period 2017–2021. She was elected representative to the Storting from the constituency of Oslo for the period 2021–2025, for the Socialist Left Party.

In the Storting, she was a member of the Standing Committee on Health and Care Services for the period 2021–2025, and a member of the delegation to the Parliamentary Assembly of the Organization for Security and Co-operation in Europe.

She was reelected representative to the Storting from Oslo for the period 2025–2029.

=== Party politics ===
In February 2023, ahead of the party convention, the Socialist Party committee was divided on whether or not to designate Hussein or Lars Haltbrekken to become deputy leader succeeding Kirsti Bergstø who was the sole candidate to succeed outgoing leader Audun Lysbakken. Hussein was elected deputy leader on 18 March at the party convention, with 114 votes against Haltbrekken's 101. She announced in October 2026 that she wouldn't seek re-election at the 2027 convention.

== Personal life ==
Hussein was born in Somalia on 24 July 1986, and came to Norway as a refugee when she was ten years old. She has worked as a social worker for both the NAV and the Child Welfare Service.
