= Fellesaksjonen mot gasskraftverk =

Former Environmental Organisation

- Formation: 1997
- Dissolved: 2002
- Type: NGO
- Purpose: Environmentalism
- Headquarters: Oslo, Norway
- Leader: Lars Haltbrekken
- Website: www.ngo.grida.no/fmg

Fellesaksjonen mot gasskraftverk (lit. The common action against gas power plants) is a former environmental organisation that functioned as a binding among various NGOs who were opposed to the construction of fossile gas thermal power plants in Norway. It was created in all secrecy in 1997 and was able to collect about 3,000 people willing to use civil disobedience to hinder the construction, before going public to announce this resistance. The organization was disestablished in 2002.

== History ==
The organization was established mainly by the Norwegian Society for the Conservation of Nature (NNV) and Natur og Ungdom (NU). It was led by former leader of NU, and later leader of NNV, Lars Haltbrekken. The background for the organization was that Naturkraft had permission to build two gas-powered thermal power plants at Kårstø and Kollsnes, though these would be built without carbon sequenciation. At the congress of NU in January 2007 there had been made a decision to use civil disobedience, and a network to organize this was needed.

The rhetorics of the organization were partially based on threatening Cabinet Jagland with a new Alta controversy demonstrations just before the 1997 election. The strategy worked, and in the spring of 1997 Thorbjørn Jagland delayed the permissions of the power plants. After the election, the First cabinet Bondevik, who were opposed to gas power plants, enter cabinet. Fellesaksjonen successfully managed to hinder the building of gas power plants during its existence, with the full climax coming in 2000 when the First cabinet Bondevik left office to hinder their building. By 2002 there was no longer use for Fellesaksjonen, who closed down, though the work still continued in other environmental organizations.
