= Hilde Gaebpie Danielsen =

Norwegian politician (born 1981)

Hilde Marie Gaebpie Danielsen (born 12 October 1981) is a Norwegian politician for the Socialist Left Party.

She grew up in Tustna Municipality, and chose a career as a cook on an offshore oil platform. Being a South Sami, she married Mattis Danielsen in 2014, whom she met at Riddu Riđđu in 2006. They settled in Røros Municipality.

Ahead of the 2019 Norwegian local elections, she facilitated the translation of the Socialist Left Party's party platform into the South Sámi language. She was elected to the municipal council of Røros Municipality. In 2021 she was elected as a deputy representative to the Parliament of Norway from Sør-Trøndelag.

In October 2026, she and Lars Haltbrekken, the member she is allotted to deputise for, announced they were in a relationship.
