= Lisbet Rugtvedt =

Norwegian politician

Lisbet Rugtvedt (born 3 July 1967) is a Norwegian politician for the Socialist Left Party.

== Career ==
She was born in Skien. She finished secondary education in Skien in 1986 and a minor in the history of ideas at the University of Oslo in 1993. She served as a member of the Skien city council from 1987 to 1989. She became a central board member of the Socialist Youth in 1986, was promoted to the organizational secretary in 1988 and served as leader from 1990 to 1992. From 1993 to 1999, she was a central board member of the Socialist Left Party.

She worked as secretary to the city councillor in Oslo from 1994 to 1995 and adviser in Save the Children from 1998 to 2000. She served as a deputy representative to the Parliament of Norway from Telemark during the term 1989–1993 and from Oslo during the term 1997–2001. During the latter term, from April 2000, she moved up as a regular representative meanwhile Erik Solheim was appointed as a peace negotiator in Sri Lanka. She was then a political advisor in the Socialist Left Party parliamentary group from 2001 to 2005.

When the Socialist Left Party entered the Cabinet in 2005, Rugtvedt was appointed State Secretary in the Ministry of Education and Research. She left in 2012 to become secretary-general in the National Association for Public Health.

She has also been a board member of the Co-operative Housing Federation of Norway from 1991 to 1993 and member of Norway's Contact Committee for Immigrants and the Authorities between 1992 and 1997.

Party political offices
Preceded by Paul Chaffey	Leader of the Socialist Youth; 1990–1992	Succeeded by Kyrre Lekve
