= Abelia (organisation) =

Norwegian trade organization

Abelia is an employers' organisation in Norway, organised under the national Confederation of Norwegian Enterprise.

Its predecessor was Kunnskapsbedriftenes landsforening. Managing director from 1986 to 2000 was Finn Karsten Ramstad.

Abelia was established in 2001, and has 2,800 member companies. The first managing director, from 2001 to 2013, was Paul Chaffey. Håkon Haugli took over in 2014. Haugli went on to Innovation Norway in 2019 and was succeeded by Øystein Eriksen Søreide.
