= Agnete Tjærandsen =

Norwegian politician (born 1932)

Agnete Tjærandsen (born 27 November 1932) is a Norwegian politician for the Conservative Party.

She served as a deputy representative to the Parliament of Norway from Nordland during the term 2017–2021. When meeting in parliamentary session in November 2018, at age 86, she became the oldest known parliamentary member in Norway's history, since 1814.

She was a journalist in the Norwegian Broadcasting Corporation. After retiring from her professional career she lived for a time as an expatriate in Spain, but later relocated (back) to Bodø Municipality, where she was originally from.
