= Andreas Sjalg Unneland =

Norwegian politician (born 1994)

- Born: 30 June 1994 (age 32)
- Education: University of Bergen
- Occupation: Politician
- Political party: Socialist Left Party

Andreas Sjalg Unneland (born 30 June 1994) is a Norwegian politician. He has been a member of the Storting since 2021, representing the Socialist Left Party, elected from the constituency of Oslo.

== Political career ==
Unneland was deputy representative to the Storting for the period 2017–2021, from the constituency of Hordaland. He chaired Socialist Youth from 2018 to 2020. He was elected representative to the Storting from the constituency of Oslo for the period 2021–2025, for the Socialist Left Party.

== Personal life ==
Unneland was born on 30 June 1994. He studied jurisprudence at the University of Bergen.

Party political offices
Preceded by Andrea Sjøvoll	Leader of the Socialist Youth; 2018–2020	Succeeded by Synnøve Kronen Snyen
