= Mats Kirkebirkeland =

Norwegian politician (born 1989)

Mats Kirkebirkeland (born 8 May 1989) is a Norwegian politician for the Conservative Party.

He served as a deputy representative to the Parliament of Norway from Oslo during the term 2017–2021. In total he met during 175 days of parliamentary session. He hails from Bergen.
