= Lars Haltbrekken =

Norwegian environmentalist and politician

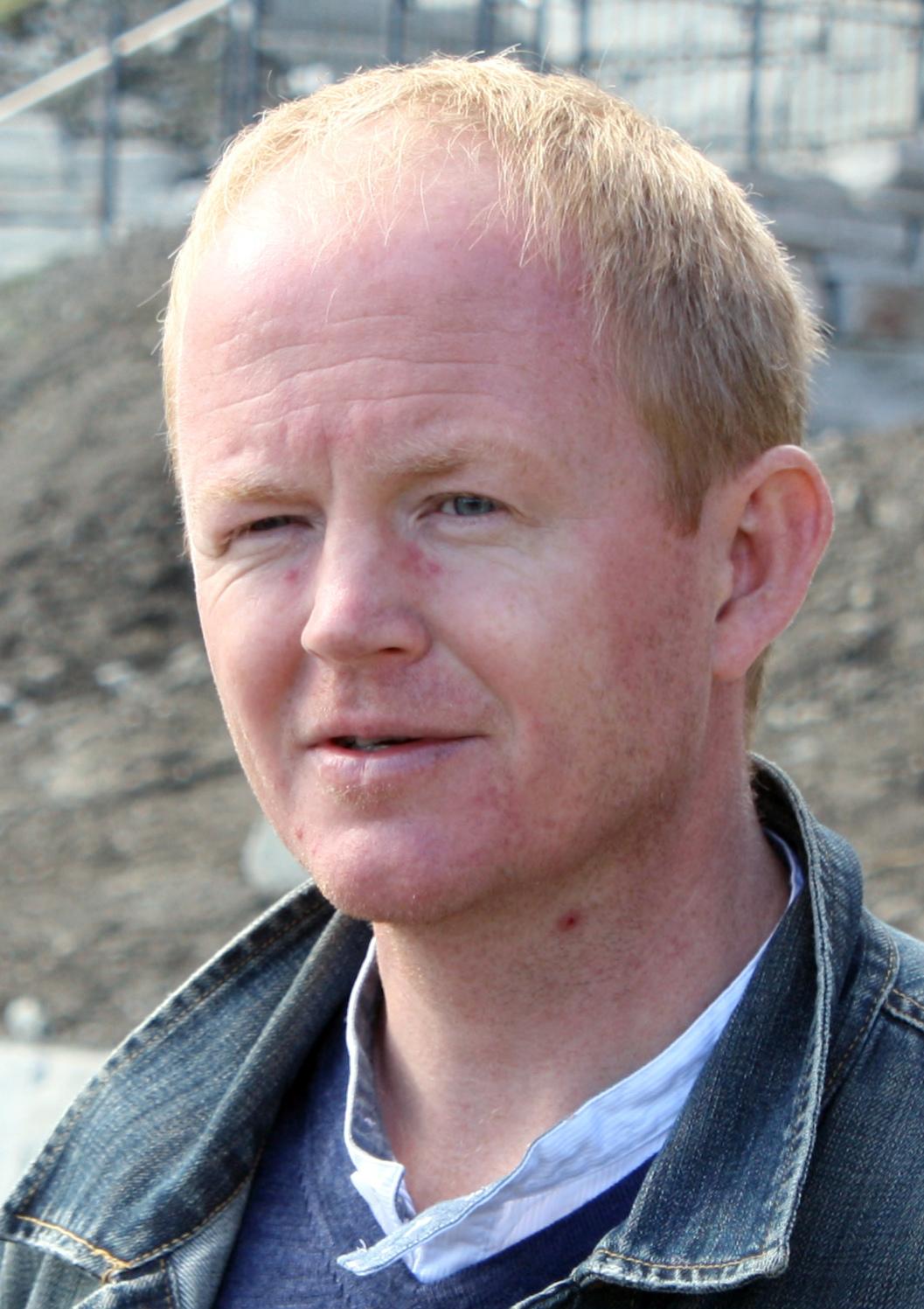
- Haltbrekken in 2011

Second Deputy Leader of the Socialist Left Party
- Incumbent
- Assumed office 15 March 2025
- Leader: Kirsti Bergstø
- Preceded by: Torgeir Knag Fylkesnes

Member of the Storting
- Incumbent
- Assumed office 1 October 2017
- Constituency: Sør-Trøndelag

Personal details
- Born: 9 March 1971 (age 55) Trondheim, Sør-Trøndelag, Norway
- Party: Socialist Left
- Spouse: Silje Schei Tveitdal (m. 2015; sep. 2022)
- Occupation: Politician; Environmentalist

Lars Haltbrekken (born 9 March 1971) is a Norwegian environmentalist and was elected to the Parliament of Norway in 2017 for the Socialist Left Party. He was chairman of Friends of the Earth Norway from 2005 to 2016 after having been deputy chairman from 2003 to 2005. Haltbrekken was also chairman of Natur og Ungdom in 1995 and 1996. In between the two leadership roles, he worked primarily trying to prevent natural gas power plants in Norway, and was chairman of Fellesaksjonen mot gasskraftverk (lit. The common action against gas power plants). He grew up in Trondheim.

== Political career ==
=== Parliament ===
Haltbrekken was elected to the Storting in 2017 and was re-elected in 2021 and again in 2025.

=== Party politics ===
In February 2023, ahead of the party convention, the Socialist Party committee was divided on whether to designate Haltbrekken or Marian Hussein as deputy leader succeeding Kirsti Bergstø who was the sole candidate to succeed outgoing leader Audun Lysbakken. Despite being considered the favourite to become deputy leader, he lost against Hussein with 101 to 114 votes. After Torgeir Knag Fylkesnes announced that he wouldn't seek re-election as second deputy leader, Haltbrekken again announced his candidacy, this time securing the position at the party convention on 15 March 2025.

== Personal life ==
Haltbrekken was married to Silje Schei Tveitdal from 1998 to 2022. She had served as the party's party secretary from 2009 to 2015.

In October 2026, Haltbrekken announced he was in a relationship with his deputy member of parliament, Hilde Gaebpie Danielsen.

Preceded by Erik Solheim	Chairman of Friends of the Earth Norway; 2005–2016	Succeeded by Silje Lundberg
Preceded by Heidi Sørensen	Chairman of Natur og Ungdom; 1995–1996	Succeeded by Silje Schei Tveitdal
