= Mudassar Hussain Kapoor =

Norwegian politician (born 1976)

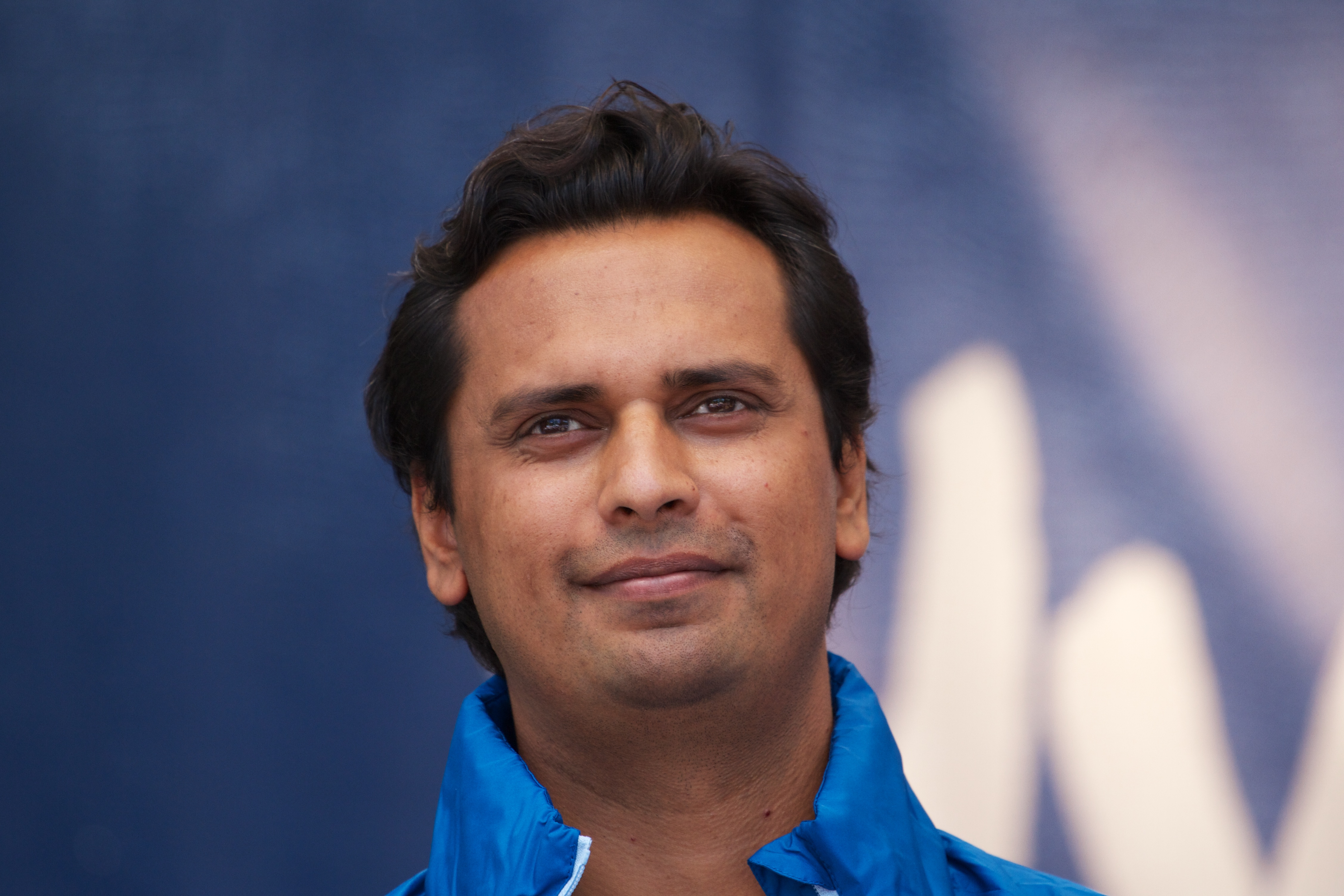

Leader of the Oslo Conservative Party
- Incumbent
- Assumed office 27 January 2024
- Deputy: Ingeborg Tennes
- Preceded by: Morten Steenstrup

Chair of the Standing Committee on Finance and Economic Affairs
- In office 4 February 2020 – 30 September 2021
- First Deputy: Hadia Tajik
- Second Deputy: Sylvi Listhaug; Hans Andreas Limi
- Preceded by: Henrik Asheim
- Succeeded by: Eigil Knutsen

Member of the Storting
- Incumbent
- Assumed office 1 October 2013
- Constituency: Oslo

Personal details
- Born: Mudassar Hussain Kapoor; 14 December 1976 (age 49) Oslo, Norway
- Party: Conservative
- Children: 3
- Education: BI Norwegian Business School; Norwegian School of Economics

Mudassar Hussain Kapoor (born 14 December 1976) is a Norwegian politician. He is a member of the Conservative Party and has served as a member of the Storting for Oslo since 2013.

== Education ==
Kapoor studied marketing, branding and management at the BI Norwegian Business School from 1995 to 2000 and earned an MBA in strategic management from the Norwegian School of Economics in 2012.

== Career ==
Kapoor began his career in sales and marketing for Royal Dutch Shell in 2000. In 2006, he transitioned into politics as a campaign manager for the Conservative Party where he worked until 2012. The same year, he became a fundraiser for SOS Children's Villages.

=== Local politics ===
He was elected to Oslo city council from the Søndre Nordstrand district in 2011 and served on the Finance Committee. In the 2013 Norwegian parliamentary election he was nominated in the 5th spot on the Conservative Party's ballot and gained a seat in the parliament in the election.

After Morten Steenstrup announced he wouldn't seek re-election as leader of the Oslo Conservatives, the election committee proposed Kapoor as the new leader along with Ingeborg Tennes as deputy leader. Both were formally elected at the party's annual meeting on 27 January 2024. The duo were re-elected in 2026.

=== Parliament ===
Kapoor was elected to the Storting in the 2013 election and was re-elected in 2017 and 2021.

In the Storting, Kapoor served as a member of the Standing Committee on Local Government and Public Administration from 2013 to 2017.

After Henrik Asheim was appointed to the Solberg cabinet, Kapoor succeeded him as chair of the Standing Committee on Finance and Economic Affairs. He held this post from February 2020 to September 2021, and was succeeded by Eigil Knutsen.

== Personal life ==
Kapoor was born on 14 December 1976 in Oslo. He is of Pakistani descent, his family having immigrated to Norway from Pakistan in 1971, and he was born five years later.

He is married and has a son and a daughter. The family lives in Ekeberg, Oslo.
