= Vetle Wang Soleim =

Norwegian politician (born 1993)

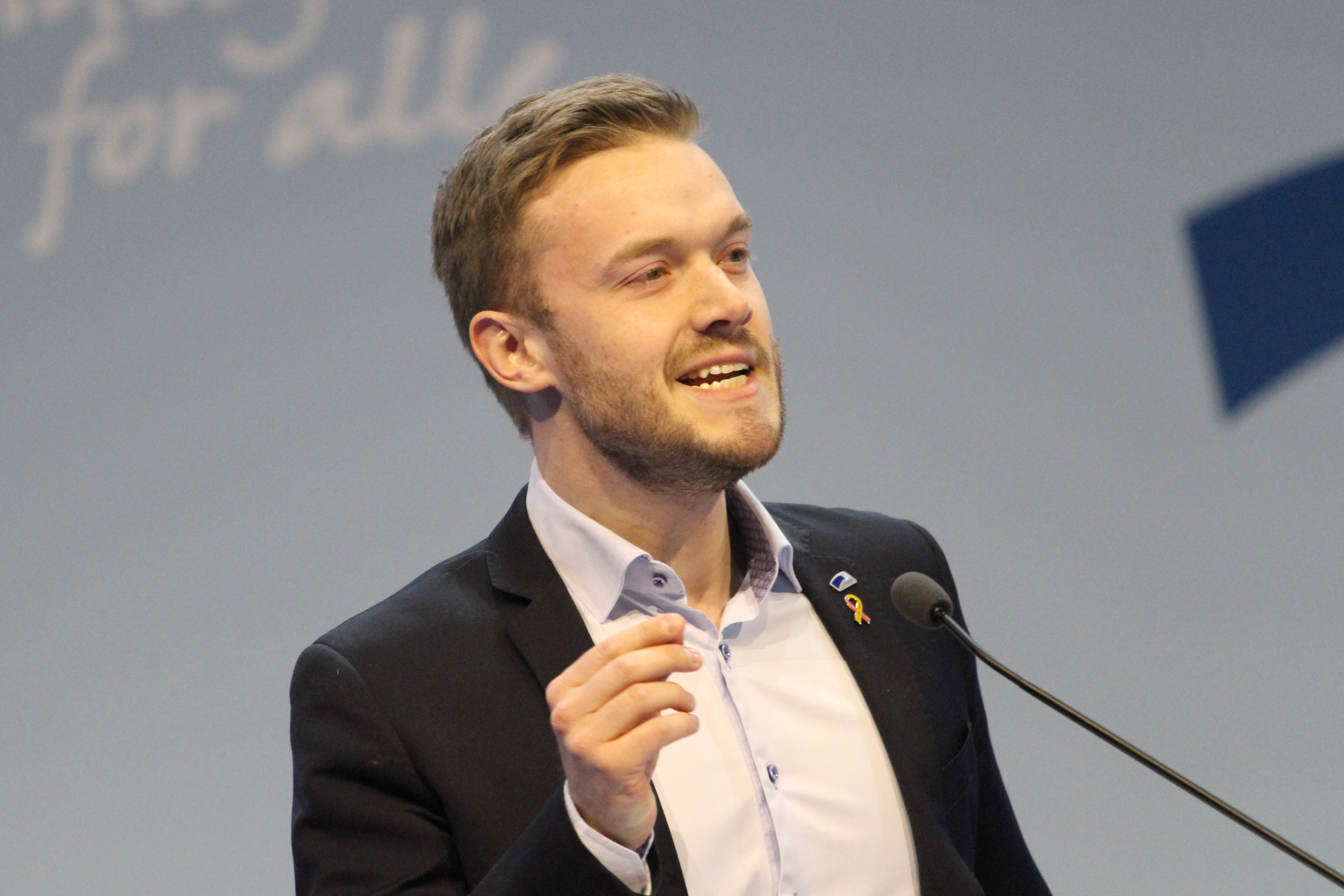
- Soleim in 2017
- Born: 5 March 1993 (age 33); Kristiansund, Norway
- Occupation: Politician
- Years active: 2017–2021
- Known for: Storting member
- Political party: Conservative Party

Vetle Wang Soleim (born 5 March 1993) is a Norwegian politician. He was elected representative to the Storting for the period 2017–2021 for the Conservative Party.

In the Storting, Soleim was a member of the Standing Committee on Finance and Economic Affairs.
