= Eigil Knutsen =

Norwegian politician

Egil Knutsen

Chair of the Standing Committee on Finance and Economic Affairs
- In office 21 October 2021 – 2 April 2024
- First Deputy: Tina Bru
- Second Deputy: Kari Elisabeth Kaski
- Preceded by: Mudassar Kapur
- Succeeded by: Tuva Moflag

Member of the Storting
- In office 1 October 2017 – 30 September 2025
- Constituency: Hordaland

Deputy Member of the Storting
- In office 1 October 2013 – 30 September 2017
- Constituency: Hordaland

Personal details
- Born: 21 October 1988 (age 37) Haugesund, Rogaland, Norway
- Party: Labour
- Education: University of Bergen

Eigil Knutsen (born 21 October 1988) is a Norwegian politician for the Labour Party. He served as a member of the Storting for Hordaland from 2017 to 2025 and was previously a deputy member from 2013 to 2017.

== Early life ==
Knutsen was born on 21 October 1988 in Haugesund, Rogaland.

Knutsen studied at the University of Bergen from 2008 to 2013, graduating with a Master's degree in economics.

== Career ==
From 2015 to 2017, Knutsen worked as a political adviser to Bergen Chief Commissioner Harald Schjelderup.

=== Parliament ===
He served as a deputy representative to the Storting for Hordaland during the term 2013–2017.

Knutsen was elected as a representative to the Storting for Hordaland in the 2017 election. He was re-elected in 2021. He also became the chair of the Standing Committee on Finance and Economic Affairs. He also became the party's financial spokesperson.

On 20 March 2024, Knutsen announced that he would be resigning as spokesperson and committee chair, while additionally announcing that he wouldn't seek re-election at the 2025 election. He was succeeded by Tuva Moflag on 2 April.

Three months after leaving parliament, the government appointed him as the leader of their new Tax Commission.

== Personal life ==
Knutsen was on Utøya during the 2011 Utøya shootings, but succeeded in hiding from the shooter.
