= Petter Gottschalk =

Professor of Information Technology

- Born: March 27, 1950 (age 76)
- Education: Technische Universität Berlin; Dartmouth College
- Scientific career
- Fields: IT strategy
- Workplaces: BI Norwegian Business School

Petter Gottschalk (born March 27, 1950) is a Norwegian professor of IT strategy employed at the BI Norwegian Business School at its Institute for Leadership and Organizational Management.

== Early life and education ==
He received a Diplom-Kaufmann from Technische Universität Berlin, Master of Science degree from Dartmouth College and Massachusetts Institute of Technology, and Doctor of Business Administration degree from Henley Management College and Brunel University. He has over 12,000 citations with h-index of 54.

== Career ==
Gottschalk has been CEO of Norwegian Computing Center, ABB Datakabel, Statens kantiner and Norsk Informasjonsteknologi (NIT).

In recent years, Gottschalk has done research on the police and their use of IT. He has also done much research on knowledge management, and he has published a number of books on that subject, as well as books about the police. He has also worked as an advisor to the police. His research on the police and their use of information technology has resulted in his appearance in the news media when this topic has been in the news. Gottschalk also researches crime as seen from the police perspective, in particular organized crime and financial crime. In recent years, he has published many articles as well as a number of books in English about organized crime, financial crime and criminal entrepreneurship. Gottschalk was an active participant in the Norwegian public discourse about EU's Data Retention Directive in 2010 expressing his opinion that the police ought to make better use of the sources they already have.

== Books authored ==
- Corporate Internal Fraud Investigations: Empirical Reviews of Examination Maturity
- Corporate Compliance and Conformity A Convenience Theory Approach to Executive Deviance
- CEOs and White-Collar Crime A Convenience Perspective
- Chief Executive Offenders and Economic Crime A Convenience Theory Approach
- Financial Crime Issues Fraud Investigations and Social Control - Textbook
