= Elizabeth Åsjord Sire =

Norwegian politician (born 1995)

Deputy Member of the Storting
- In office 2017–2021
- Constituency: Nordland

Personal details
- Born: November 11, 1995 (age 30) Svolvær, Norway
- Party: Conservative
- Occupation: Politician

Elizabeth Åsjord Sire (born 11 November 1995) is a Norwegian politician for the Conservative Party.

She serves as a deputy representative to Jonny Finstad in the Parliament of Norway from Nordland during the term 2017–2021. Hailing from Svolvær, she has been a central board member of the Norwegian Young Conservatives.
