= Snorre Valen =

Norwegian journalist, musician and former politician

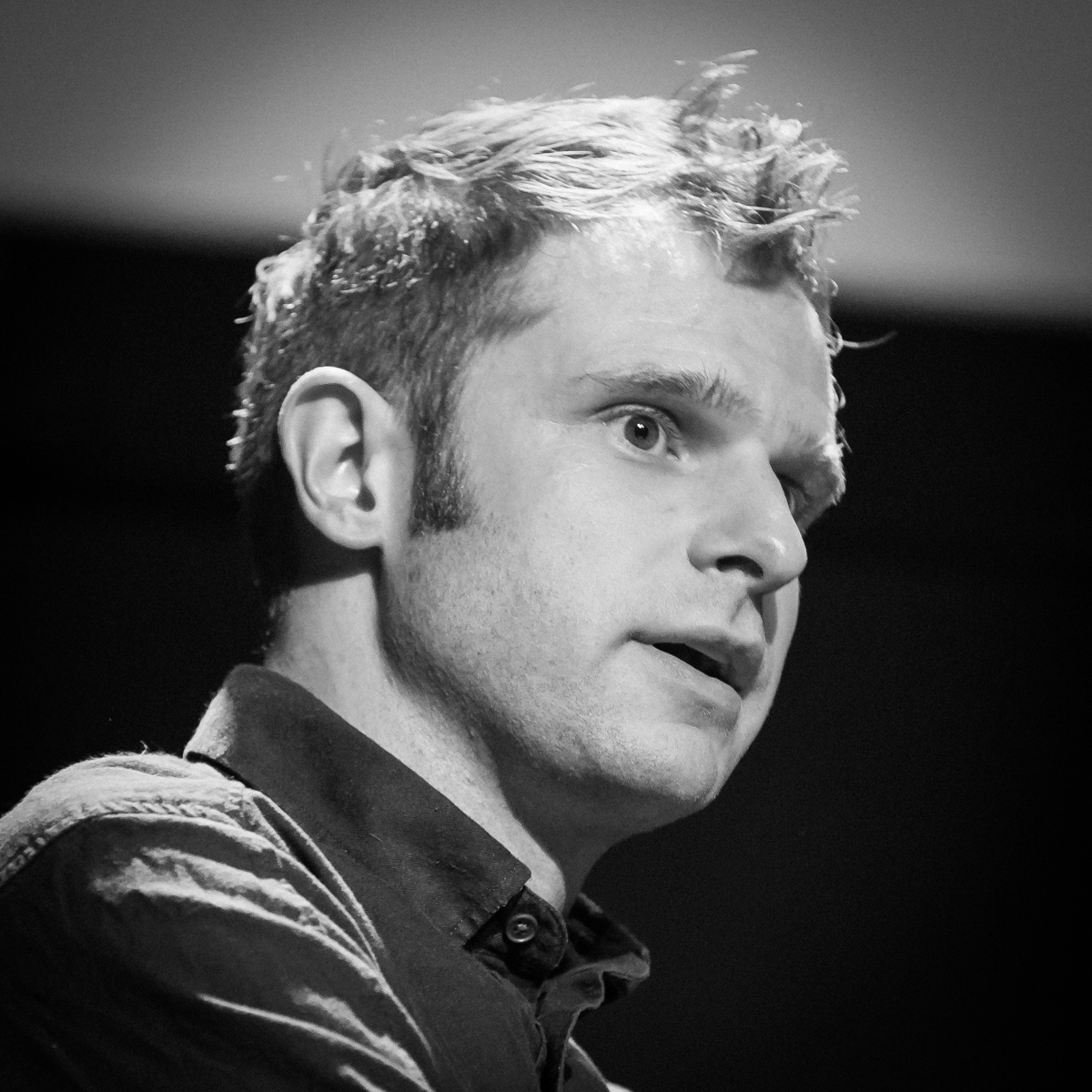
- Valen in 2015

Deputy Leader of the Socialist Left Party
- In office 29 November 2015 – 30 March 2019 Serving with Oddny Irene Miljeteig and Kirsti Bergstø
- Leader: Audun Lysbakken
- Preceded by: Bård Vegar Solhjell
- Succeeded by: Torgeir Knag Fylkesnes

Second Vice Chair of the Standing Committee on Foreign Affairs and Defence
- In office 18 April 2012 – 30 September 2013
- Leader: Ine Eriksen Søreide
- Preceded by: Bård Vegar Solhjell
- Succeeded by: Kristian Norheim

Member of the Storting
- In office 1 October 2009 – 30 September 2017
- Constituency: Sør-Trøndelag

Personal details
- Born: Snorre Serigstad Valen; 16 September 1984 (age 41) Oslo, Norway
- Party: Socialist Left
- Children: One
- Occupation: Journalist; Musician; Politician (formerly)

Snorre Serigstad Valen (born 16 September 1984 in Oslo) is a Norwegian journalist, musician and former politician from the Socialist Left Party. He served as an MP in the Storting from Sør-Trøndelag from 2009 to 2017, and deputy leader of the party from November 2015 to 2019. Valen previously worked as a communications assistant at NTNU Social Research.

In 2020, he became head of the politics section of the newspaper Nidaros in Trondheim, Norway.

== Early life and education ==
Valen was born on 16 September 1984, the son of Knut Serigstad, a civil engineer, and Kristin Valen, a social worker.

Valen attended Berg elementary school from 1991 to 1997 and Blussovoll lower secondary from 1997 to 2000. He then went to dance and drama at Trondheim Cathedral School from 2000 to 2003. He then went to NTNU from 2003 to 2004, and studied state science, international and imperative politics and got a ex.phil in political risk.

== Career ==
From 2007 to 2008 Valen was the head of the short-lived newspaper Arbeideravisa in Trondheim.

Valen sat in the Sør-Trøndelag County Council and in Trondheim City Council from 2003 to 2007, and during this period, led the foreign affairs and welfare committees in the county council.

After being elected to the Norwegian parliament in 2009, he served as member of the Standing Committee on Energy and the Environment from 2009 to March 2012. He was the second deputy chair of the Standing Committee on Foreign Affairs and Defence from April 2012 to September 2013.

In February 2011, Valen nominated the website WikiLeaks for the Nobel Peace Prize. In 2013, he nominated Chelsea Manning and Edward Snowden for the 2014 Nobel peace prize, stating that Manning's leaks helped end the Iraq War while Snowden had exposed how the war on terror had led to mass surveillance of ordinary people.

As an anti-monarchist, Valen consequently refused to attend the yearly royal dinners for parliamentarians.

On 20 March 2017, Valen announced that he would not be seeking re-election to Parliament in the September election.

On 24 September 2018, Valen announced that he wouldn't be seeking re-election as deputy leader the next year.

== Music ==
Valen is a pianist and singer, has a background in Nidarosdomens Guttekor and has studied music at Trondheim katedralskole. From 2004 to 2008 he played in the band Gallery, and released one record with the group. Later on he became a member of the electronica group Amish 82 and the blues band Peevish Penfriend. In 2010, he composed the melodies heard at each stop on the then-new Bergen Light Rail network.
