= Sheida Sangtarash =

Norwegian politician

Deputy Representative to the Parliament of Norway
- In office 2017–2021
- Constituency: Akershus

Member of Bærum Municipal Council
- Incumbent
- Assumed office 2015

Personal details
- Born: April 21, 1984 (age 42) Iran
- Party: Socialist Left Party

Sheida Sangtarash (born 21 April 1984) is a Norwegian politician for the Socialist Left Party.

Sangtarash migrated to Norway from Iran as a teenager. In 2015, she was elected to Bærum municipal council. She served as a deputy representative to the Parliament of Norway from Akershus during the term 2017–2021.
