= Heidi Nordby Lunde =

Norwegian politician

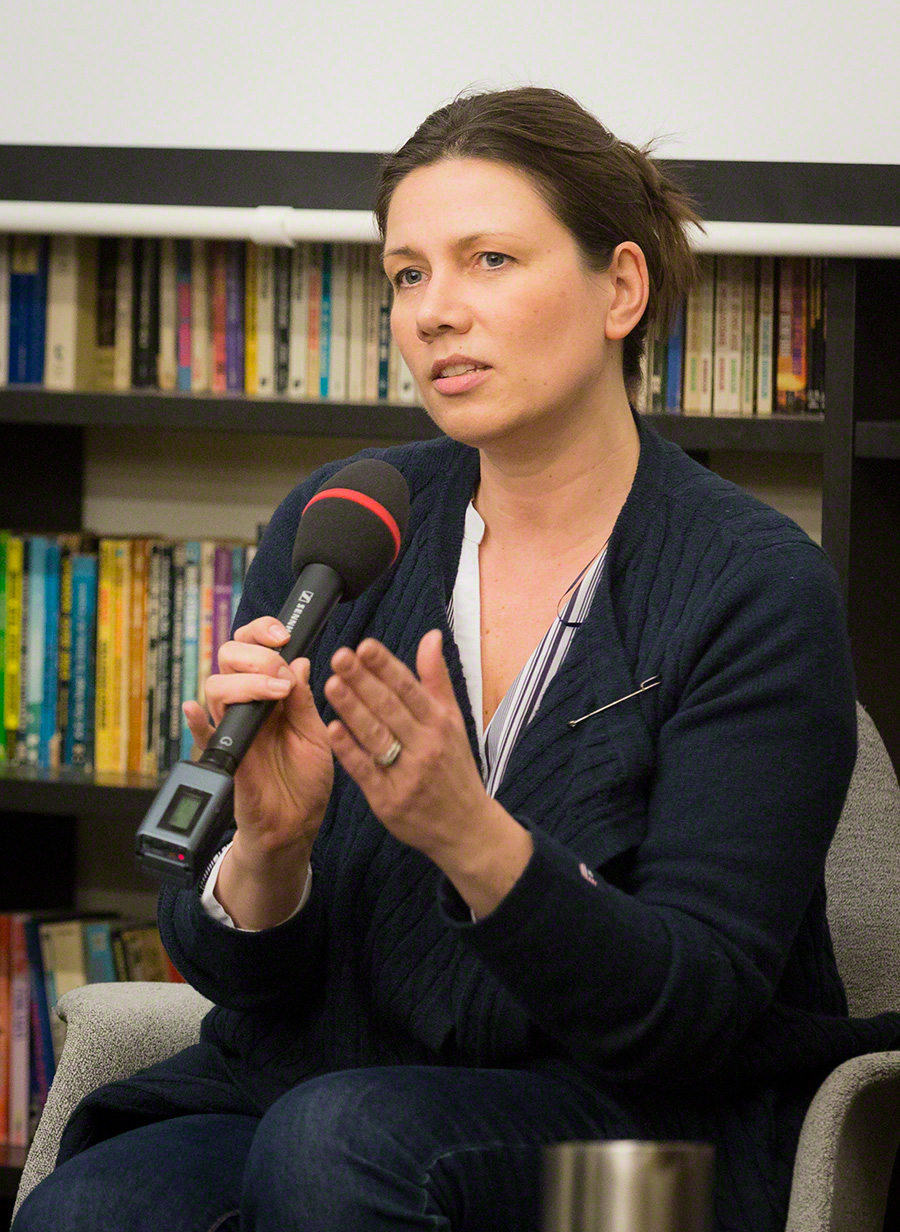
- Heidi Nordby Lunde at an event marking Wikipedia's first 15 years

Leader of the Oslo Conservatives
- In office 27 January 2018 – 22 January 2022
- Deputy: Eirik Lae Solberg
- Preceded by: Nikolai Astrup
- Succeeded by: Morten Steenstrup

Member of the Storting
- In office 16 October 2013 – 30 September 2025
- Constituency: Oslo

Personal details
- Born: 3 February 1973 (age 53) Oslo, Norway
- Party: Conservative; Progress (until 1994)
- Occupation: Politician

Heidi Nordby Lunde (born 3 February 1973) is a former Norwegian politician for the Conservative Party and currently a humanist activist. As a deputy representative to the Storting, she met regularly from 2013, and later served as an ordinary member of the Storting from 2017 until 2025.

== Political career ==
=== Parliament ===
Lunde was elected as deputy to the Parliament of Norway from Oslo in 2013. She met as deputy for Ine Marie Eriksen Søreide, and was member of the Standing Committee on Finance and Economic Affairs from 2013 to 2017. She was elected ordinary representative to the Storting for the period 2017–2021, and was member of the Standing Committee on Labour and Social Affairs during this period. She was re-elected to the Storting for the period 2021–2025, and a member of the Standing Committee on Finance and Economic Affairs from 2021.

In 2020 she was one of the signatories of the "Call for Inclusive Feminism," a document which led to the establishment of the Initiative for Inclusive Feminism.

=== Leader of the Oslo Conservative Party ===
She served as the leader of the Oslo Conservatives from 2018 to 2022, with Eirik Lae Solberg as deputy leader. The duo were re-elected in 2020.

On 27 October 2021, Lunde announced that she would not be seeking re-election as leader of the Oslo Conservatives. She cited that the local chapter needed "new blood" to lead them into the 2023 local elections. Morten Steenstrup was designated her successor in December 2021 and officially succeeded her on 22 January 2022.

Lunde stepped down from frontline politics following the 2025 Norwegian parliamentary election, and afterwards was appointed Director of Policy and Public Relations for the Norwegian Humanist Association.
