= Socialist Youth (Norway) =

Socialist Youth Sosialistisk Ungdom
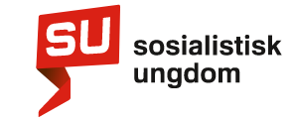
- Leader: Sara Ude Hasle
- Founded: 1975
- Headquarters: Møllergata 4, Oslo
- Membership: c. 1,334 (2023)
- Ideology: Democratic socialism Feminism; Revolutionary socialism
- Mother party: Socialist Left
- Nordic affiliation: Socialistisk Ungdom i Norden (SUN)
- Website: Official website

Socialist Youth (Norwegian: Sosialistisk Ungdom) is the youth league of the Socialist Left Party of Norway. Starting June 2026, head of the organisation is Sara Ude Hasle.

SU's program states that they aim for a peaceful revolution, based on democratic principles and based in grassroots activism. Their platform states that they are ecosocialists, feminists, anti-racists and Marxists, as well as taking part in the peace movement and queer rights movement.

== Leaders ==
- Monica Schancke 1975
- Asbjørn Eidhammer, Ingrid Ofstad 1975–1976
- Erik Solheim 1977–1980
- Øystein Gudim 1980–1982
- Jan Morten Torrisen, Kristin Halvorsen, Sverre Pedersen, Hanne Lyssand, Siri Aasheim 1982–1984
- Kristin Halvorsen 1984–1986
- Raymond Johansen 1986–1988
- Paul Chaffey 1988–1990
- Lisbet Rugtvedt 1990–1992
- Kyrre Lekve 1992–1994
- Andreas Tjernshaugen 1994–1996
- Heikki Holmås 1996–1999
- Kari Anne Moe 1999–2002
- Ingrid Fiskaa 2002–2004
- Audun Herning 2004–2006
- Kirsti Bergstø 2006–2008
- Mali Steiro Tronsmoen 2008–2010
- Olav Magnus Linge 2010–2012
- Andreas Halse 2012–2014
- Nicholas Wilkinson 2014–2016
- Andrea Sjøvoll 2016–2018
- Andreas Sjalg Unneland 2018–2020
- Synnøve Kronen Snyen 2020–2024
- Audun Hammer Hovda 2024–2026
- Sara Ude Hasle 2026–
