= Torgeir Knag Fylkesnes =

Norwegian politician

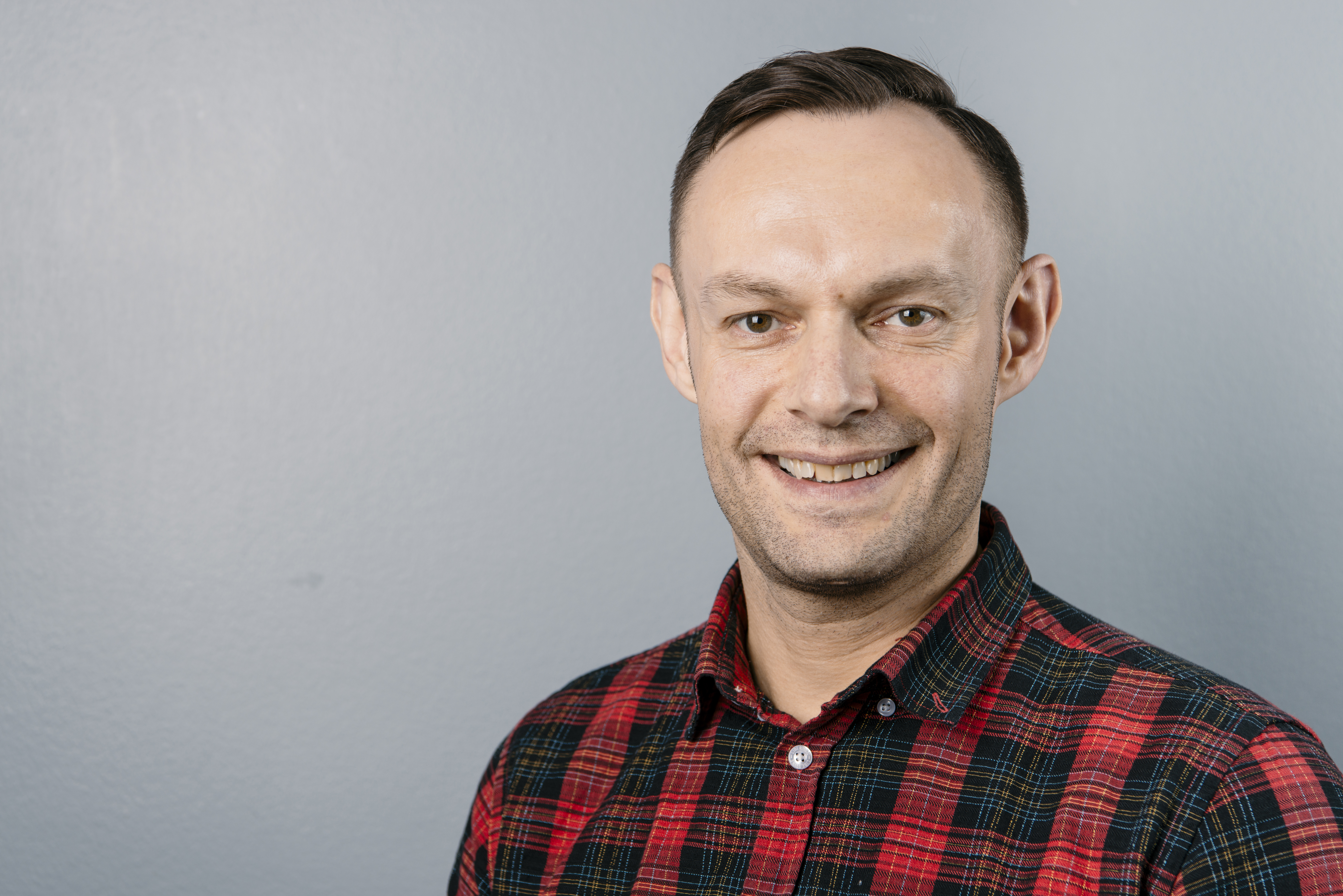

Second Deputy Leader of the Socialist Left Party
- In office 30 March 2019 – 15 March 2025
- Leader: Audun Lysbakken; Kirsti Bergstø
- Preceded by: Snorre Valen
- Succeeded by: Lars Haltbrekken

Member of the Storting
- In office 1 October 2013 – 30 September 2025
- Constituency: Troms

Deputy Member of the Storting
- In office 1 October 2001 – 30 September 2005
- Constituency: Troms

Personal details
- Born: 4 June 1975 (age 50) Tromsø, Troms, Norway
- Party: Socialist Left
- Education: Philosophy
- Alma mater: University of Tromsø
- Occupation: Politician

Torgeir Knag Fylkesnes (born 4 June 1975 in Tromsø) is a Norwegian politician for the Socialist Left Party. He served as one the party's deputy leaders from 2019 to 2025 and a member of parliament for Troms between 2013 and 2025.

== Early life ==
Fylkenes was born in Tromsø, but spent two years of his childhood in Botswana from 1983 to 1985. He has been communications advisor for Norwegian Nurses Organisation and communications leader for the Norwegian technology council.

== Political career ==
=== Parliament ===
Fylkesnes was elected as a deputy member to the Storting in the 2001 election, which he was for only one term. He was later elected a regular member in the 2013 election and has won re-election since. In parliament, he was a member of the Standing Committee on Education, Research and Church Affairs from 2013 until December 2015 when he moved to the Committee on Business and Industry.

In January 2025, he announced that he would not seek re-election at the 2025 election and as deputy leader of his party due to personal reasons.

=== Deputy leader ===
On 30 March 2019, he was elected deputy leader of the Socialist Left Party, succeeding Snorre Valen. He won with 108 votes against 100 for his opponent, Kari Elisabeth Kaski.

Few days before the 2021 election, Aftenposten revealed that Fylkesnes had owned a parliamentary apartment for free while also owning and renting an apartment in Oslo since 2013. He stated that he wasn't concerned how the ownership of the Oslo apartment would effect his economic status. He also argued that being an MP in an uncertain job, and that he wanted a place for his family to live, which is why they wished to keep the apartment.

Fylkesnes joined the Socialist Left Party's negotiating team to form a new government on 27 September 2021 in Hurdal. He vowed to contribute effectively, "take quick decisions and whatever it takes".

Following his party's withdrawal from government negotiations on 29 September, Fylkesnes was appointed to head a negotiation unit in the Storting.

In August 2022, he was open to his party withdrawing their cooperation with the Støre government on the state budget for 2023 if they went ahead with an electricity support package to the business industry.

After Audun Lysbakken announced that he would not be seeking re-election as leader, Fylkesnes was floated as a possible contender to succeed him, alongside Kirsti Bergstø and Kari Elisabeth Kaski. Ultimately, Knag Fylkesnes did not seek to become leader and was instead re-elected at the 2023 party convention, continuing under Kirsti Bergstø. After announcing that he wouldn't seek re-election as deputy leader, the party elected Lars Haltbrekken as his successor at the 2025 party convention.
