= Kristian Torve =

Norwegian politician (born 1993)

Kristian Torve (born 11 March 1993) is a Norwegian politician for the Labour Party.

He served as a deputy representative to the Parliament of Norway from Sør-Trøndelag during the term 2017–2021. Hailing from Oppdal Municipality, he has been a member of Sør-Trøndelag county council.
