= Åsunn Lyngedal =

Norwegian politician (born 1968)

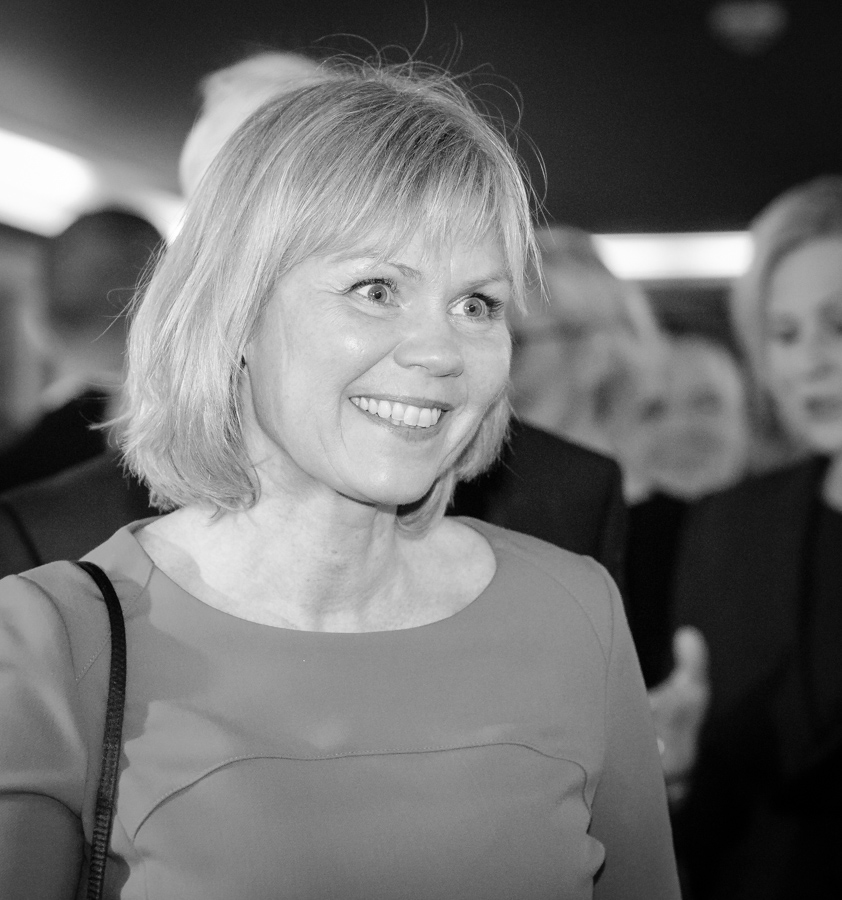
- Lyngedal at Governor Øystein Olsen's annual address in February 2018
- Born: 17 July 1968 (age 57)
- Occupations: Lawyer, politician

Åsunn Lyngedal (born 17 July 1968) is a Norwegian politician.

She was elected representative to the Storting for the period 2017–2021 for the Labour Party.
