= Audun Lysbakken =

Norwegian politician (born 1977)

Audun Lysbakken MP
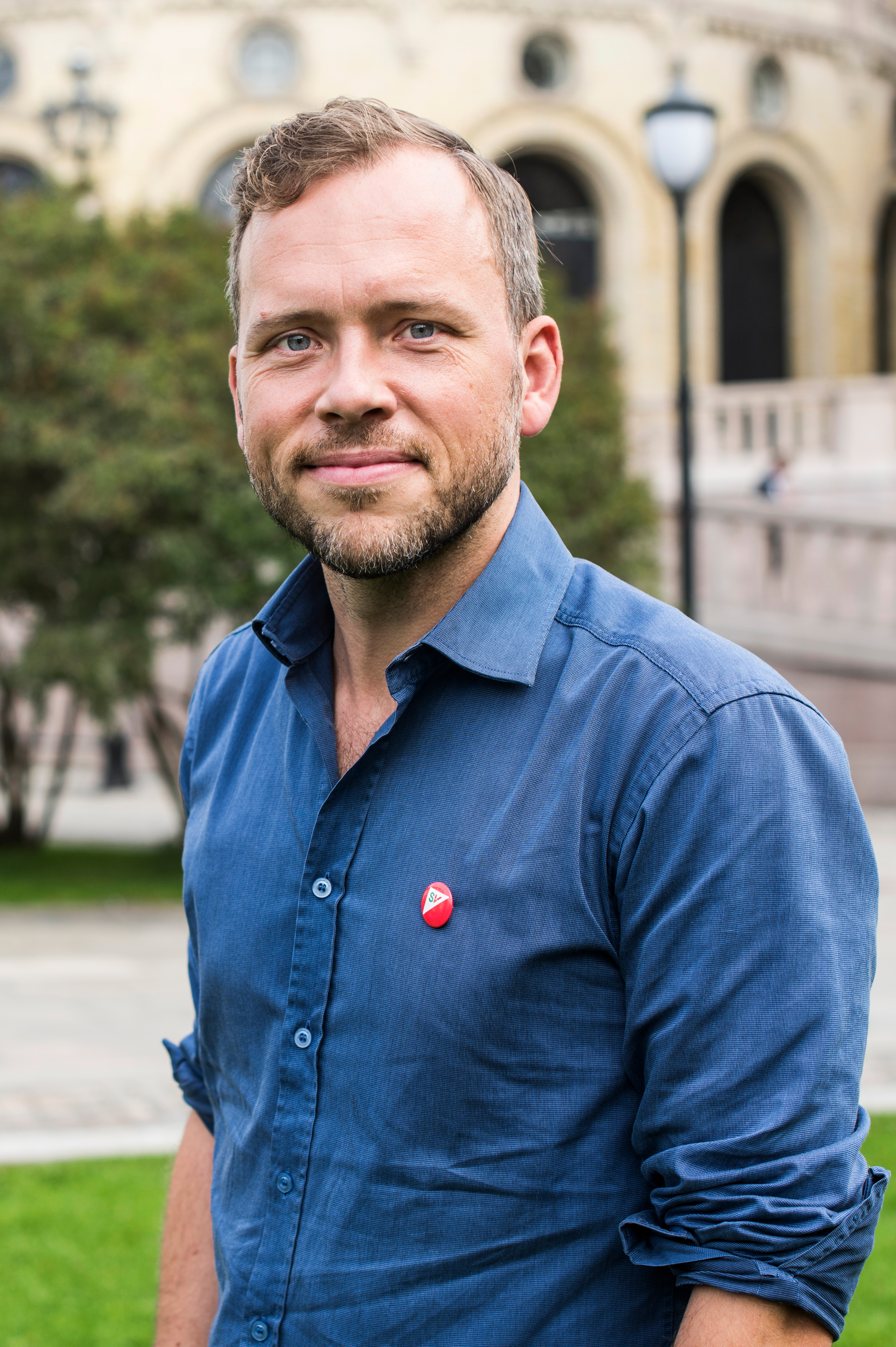
- Lysbakken outside the Storting in 2017.

Leader of the Socialist Left Party
- In office 11 March 2012 – 18 March 2023
- First Deputy: Inga Marte Thorkildsen; Oddny Irene Miljeteig; Kirsti Bergstø
- Second Deputy: Bård Vegar Solhjell; Snorre Valen; Torgeir Knag Fylkesnes
- Preceded by: Kristin Halvorsen
- Succeeded by: Kirsti Bergstø

Minister of Children and Equality
- In office 20 October 2009 – 5 March 2012
- Prime Minister: Jens Stoltenberg
- Preceded by: Anniken Huitfeldt
- Succeeded by: Inga Marte Thorkildsen

Member of the Storting
- Incumbent
- Assumed office 1 October 2009
- Deputy: Gina Barstad
- Constituency: Hordaland
- In office 1 October 2001 – 30 September 2005
- Constituency: Hordaland

Deputy Leader of the Socialist Left Party
- In office 18 February 2006 – 11 March 2012
- Leader: Kristin Halvorsen
- Preceded by: Øystein Djupedal
- Succeeded by: Inga Marte Thorkildsen

Personal details
- Born: 30 September 1977 (age 49) Bergen, Hordaland, Norway
- Party: Socialist Left
- Spouse: Siv Mjaaland
- Children: 2
- Education: Bergen Handelsgymnasium; University of Bergen

Audun Bjørlo Lysbakken (born 30 September 1977) is a Norwegian politician who served as the leader of the Norwegian Socialist Left Party from 2012 to 2023. His career in national politics began when he was elected to the Norwegian parliament in 2001. In 2006, he became deputy leader of the Socialist Left Party. He held the post as Minister of Children and Equality in Jens Stoltenberg's second government from October 2009 to March 2012, when he resigned due to a conflict of interest. Under his leadership, the Socialist Left Party made strong gains in its vote share in Parliamentary elections and membership.

== Early life and education ==
Lysbakken is the son of actor Sigurd Lysbakken (1947–1994) and cultural worker and author Geirdis Bjørlo (1952). He attended primary school at Møhlenpris elementary school (1984–1993), and high school at Bergen Handelsgymnasium (1993–1996). He has university minors in French and comparative politics from the University of Bergen (1996–1998). After his university studies, he performed mandatory civil service instead of conscript military duty, serving as a secretary at Norsk Økologisk Landbrukslag and as a journalist in the daily Klassekampen 2000–2001.

== Political career ==
=== Early career ===
Lysbakken held various posts in the youth NGOs Ungdom mot EU and Nature and Youth 1995–1996, and was involved in student politics during his university studies 1998–1999. Lysbakken held his first post in Socialist Youth, the Socialist Left party's youth organization, as leader of its Bergen chapter in 1996–1998, and went on to be elected leader of the county (Hordaland) organization in 1998–2000. He was deputy leader of the Socialist Youth's national organization in 2000–2002.

Lysbakken's first public office was as member of the Bergen City Council in 1999–2000. He was elected to the Norwegian Parliament in 2001 as a representative for Hordaland county. He was a member of the parliament's Standing Committee on Finance and Economic Affairs. He was not re-elected in 2005, but became first deputy representative. He was elected deputy leader of the Socialist Left Party on 18 February 2006.

=== Parliament ===
He was elected to the Storting from Hordaland following the 2001 election. He served until 2005, and was re-elected in the 2009 election. He was re-elected in 2013, 2017 and 2021. In January 2024, he announced that he wouldn't seek re-election in the 2025 election.

=== Government office ===
In 2009, Lysbakken reclaimed a seat in Parliament from Hordaland, and was appointed to the Standing Committee on Foreign Affairs and Defence. He was named parliamentary leader of his party group, but was shortly thereafter appointed as Minister of Children, Equality and Social Inclusion in Stoltenberg's Second Cabinet on 20 October 2009, as the first man to hold this post. When Lysbakken was appointed to the ministry, his deputy Gina Barstad took his place in Parliament.

During Lysbakken's term in office, he oversaw an increase in the funding of child protection services by over 300 million NOK per year. The parental leave and the father's quota were also extended after propositions from his office. Lysbakken also wrote a book entitled "Liberty, equality and fatherhood", which was published in 2011.

Lysbakken resigned from his office on 5 March 2012 (see "self-defense case" below). On 10 March, he was elected party leader.

=== Party leadership ===
After resigning as Minister, Lysbakken resumed his duties as a representative in the Storting and the position as parliamentary leader, now holding a seat on the Parliament's Standing Committee on Health and Social Services, as well as the Enlarged Standing Committee on Foreign and Defence Affairs. Later in the 2009-2013 assembly of the Norwegian Parliament, he moved to the Standing Committee on Schools and Education. After the 2017 election, he rejoined the Standing Committee on Foreign and Defence Affairs.

Under Lysbakken's leadership, the Socialist Left Party, which had declined steadily in the polls since joining Jens Stoltenberg's "Red-Green" government, bounced back, increasing its parliamentary group after gains in the 2017 election. The party's election campaign in 2017 and Lysbakken as party leader was awarded the prize for best campaign by a panel in the publicity industry magazine Kampanje, and the media-industry newspaper Medier24. Several commentators agreed that Lysbakken was the "winner" of several of the biggest televised debates.

The campaign, focusing on issues of inequality, climate change and education, also resulted in a growth in voter share. The party gained almost 50% in the number of votes since the poor showing in the 2013 election, gaining 4 new seats in Parliament and 176.000 votes, corresponding to a 6,0 % voter share. Party membership rose in parallel. In early 2018, the party had over 11.000 members, the highest number since the early nineties.

Lysbakken led the party into 2021 election, with the campaign focusing on tackling climate change and inequality. His party went onto win 2 more seats, increasing the seat count to 13. He was open to forming a red-green government with the Labour and Centre parties, and led the party's delegation in the pre-negotiations in Hurdal starting on 23 September. However, on 29 September, Lysbakken announced that his party would withdraw from negotiations, notably citing disagreements with the Labour and Centre Party on issues of petroleum and welfare. He reassured that the party was open to re-start negotiations at a later point in time, and added that the party would be going into opposition.

On 9 November 2022, Lysbakken announced that he wouldn't seek re-election as party leader and step down at the next party convention in March 2023, citing family reasons. Lysbakken was succeeded by his deputy leader, Kirsti Bergstø, at the party convention in March.

=== "Self-defense" case ===
In January 2012, the newspaper Dagbladet reported that the Ministry of Children and Equality had awarded NOK 500,000 to two groups to fund self-defense education for high school girls. Although approved by parliament to combat a recent spike in sexual assaults, the allocation was made without public notice, in violation of internal government rules. As Lysbakken was on parental leave when the case broke, his State secretary, Henriette Westhrin, reported that the allocation was made according to "completely normal procedure". Lysbakken later apologized unreservedly, calling the affair an "error of judgment" on his behalf and promising a "full review" of the Ministry's past funding of external projects.

In the wake of the disclosure, Lysbakken's conflict of interest in the allocation of funds to the NGO Reform, where he had been a member of the board until assuming his ministerial post, also came to attention. The Norwegian parliament's Standing Committee on Scrutiny and Constitutional Affairs opened a public inquiry into the misuse of public funds under Lysbakken's leadership. As a result of the affair, he resigned as minister on 5 March 2012. Not only Lysbakken, but also one of his State secretaries, Kirsti Bergstø, and the non-political permanent under-secretary of state, Harald Nybøen, resigned as a consequence of the case.

His conduct was labeled "political corruption" by anti-corruption watchdog Transparency International's Norwegian branch, a position that was echoed by scholar Petter Gottschalk. Professor of Law, Jan Fridthjof Bernt, however, asserted that while the case was clearly one of poor practice, there were no signs of criminal action. Based on statements by Lysbakken, alleging that "this could have happened in many ministries", the Parliament initiated a wide-reaching inquiry into the ministries' allocations to external beneficiaries. During this inquiry's final hearing, Lysbakken was lauded by opposition leader of the Standing Committee on Scrutiny and Constitutional Affairs, Anders Anundsen, for taking his constitutional responsibility and resigning, and his successor Inga Marte Thorkildsen received praise for taking measures "which could make one of the worst ministries into one of the best" in its allocation practices. The inquiry exposed irregularities in the allocation practices of several ministries.

== Political views ==
In his 2015 book, Frihet Sammen (Freedom Together), Lysbakken describes himself as a democratic socialist, a male feminist, and an environmentalist. He puts inequality and injustice at the centre of his political project, arguing that the left should prioritize the reduction of economic and social inequality. He makes the case that SV is a party rooted as strongly in socialist views as in the green, environmental tradition, and that he sees the question of climate change in terms of inter-generational and international equity. In 2009, he co-authored a book, arguing that the 2008 financial crisis demonstrated, among other things, a need for greater economic democracy.

Earlier, as deputy leader of the Socialist Youth, Lysbakken described himself as a Marxist, and expressed wishes to "abolish capitalism", as well as the Oslo Stock Exchange. In a study booklet for the Socialist Youth that he co-authored, called Manifest 02, he called for a ban on the right to privately own means of production, as well as wage labour. He argued for his views in a 2005 interview, and was defended by Prime Minister Stoltenberg when appointed minister in 2009. During his campaign to be elected party leader in 2011, he said that, "Ten years ago, when I was elected as a representative to the Parliament, I called myself a revolutionary Marxist. I no longer do. The world has changed, and the Socialist Left has changed."

== Personal life ==
He is married to Siv Mjaaland, and the couple have three children. Mjaaland has a son from a previous relationship.

Political offices
Preceded by Anniken Huitfeldt	Minister of Children and Equality; 2009–2012	Succeeded by Inga Marte Thorkildsen
Party political offices
Preceded by Øystein Djupedal	Deputy Leader of the Socialist Left Party; 2006–2012	Succeeded by Inga Marte Thorkildsen
Preceded by Kristin Halvorsen	Leader of the Socialist Left Party; 2012–2023	Succeeded by Kirsti Bergstø
Preceded by Bård Vegar Solhjell	Parliamentary Leader of the Socialist Left Party; 2012–2023	Succeeded by Kirsti Bergstø
