= Tuva Moflag =

Norwegian politician (born 1979)

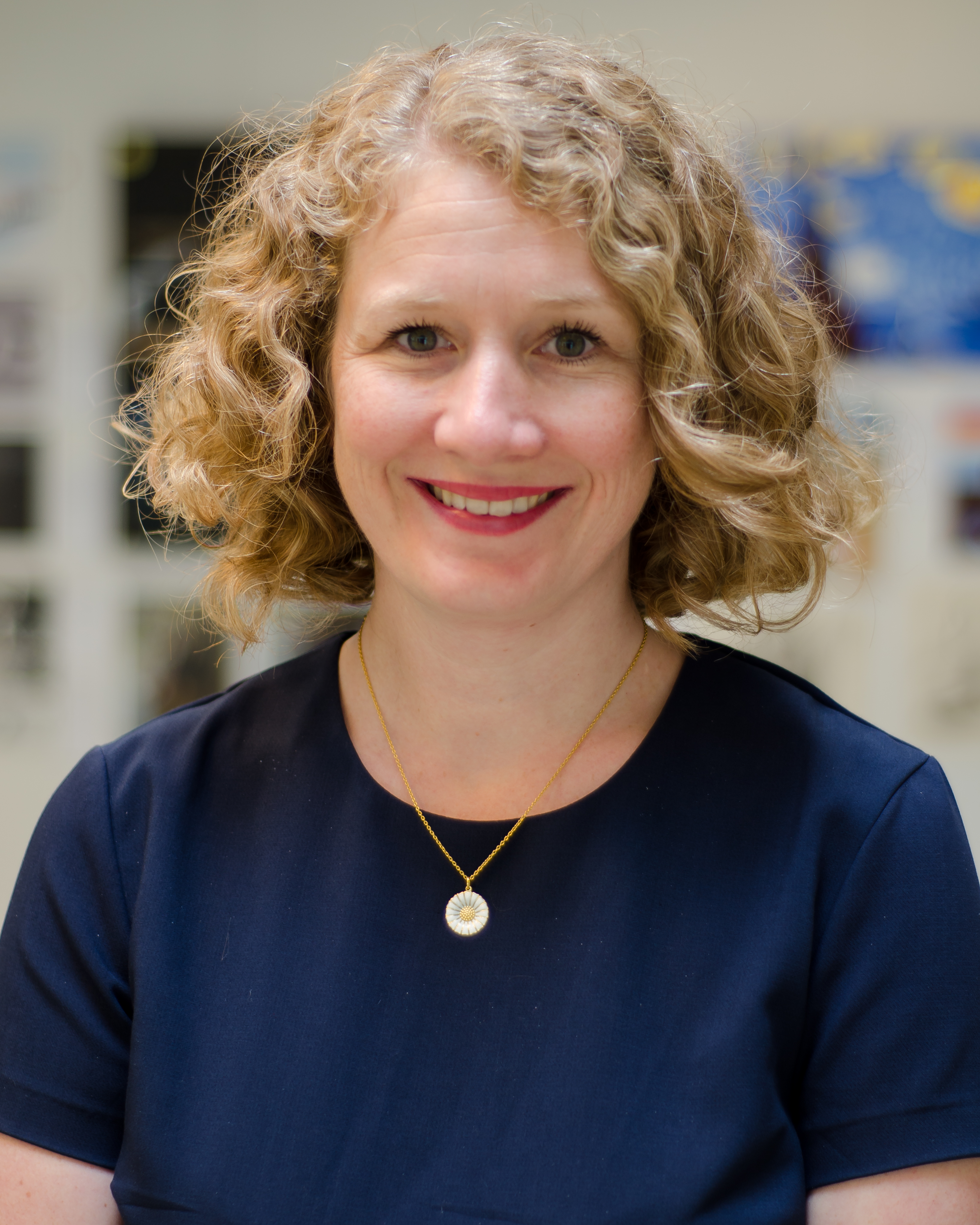
- Moflag in June 2017

Member of the Storting
- Incumbent
- Assumed office 9 October 2017
- Constituency: Akershus

Deputy Parliamentary Leader of the Labour Party
- Incumbent
- Assumed office 5 February 2025 Serving with Andreas Bjelland Eriksen
- Leader: Bjørnar Skjæran; Tonje Brenna
- Preceded by: Lene Vågslid; Åsmund Grøver Aukrust

Mayor of Ski Municipality
- In office 28 October 2015 – 28 September 2017
- Deputy: Camilla Edi Hille
- Preceded by: Anne Kristine Linnestad
- Succeeded by: Hanne Opdan

Personal details
- Born: 17 March 1979 (age 47) Oslo, Norway
- Party: Labour
- Education: Bodø University College
- Occupation: Politician

Tuva Moflag (born 17 March 1979) is a Norwegian politician for the Labour Party. She has been member of the Storting for Akershus since 2017. She has also served as one of the party's deputy parliamentary leaders since 2025 and previously served as the mayor of Ski Municipality between 2015 and 2017.

== Political career ==
Moflag served as mayor of Ski from 2015 to 2017, and was elected representative to the Storting for the period 2017–2021 for the Labour Party, from the constituency of Akershus. In the Storting, she was a member of the Standing Committee on Health and Care Services from 2017 to 2021. From 2017 to 2018 she was a delegate to the United Nations General Assembly.

She was re-elected to the Storting in 2021 and 2025. From 2021 she was a member of the Standing Committee on Labour and Social Affairs, where she was second deputy leader. In April 2024, she became chair of the Standing Committee on Finance and the party's spokesperson on finance following Eigil Knutsen's departure and retained the post following the 2025 election.

Moflag had been the party's spokesperson on labour and social policy before moving to finance.

Following the Centre Party's withdrawal from government in February 2025, she and Ingvild Kjerkol became the Labour Party's deputy parliamentary leaders. She retained the position following the 2025 election, now serving alongside Rune Støstad. Støstad would later be succeeded by Andreas Bjelland Eriksen in September 2026.

== Personal life ==
Moflag was born in Oslo on 17 March 1979, a daughter of Erling Moflag and Turid Petrine Svaleng. She graduated as an economist from the Bodø University College in 2002.

She is married and has four children and one dog.
