= Akershus (Storting constituency) =

Constituency of the Storting, the national legislature of Norway

- Constituency for the Storting
- Location of Akershus within Norway
- County: Akershus
- Population: 742,511 (2025)
- Electorate: 514,392 (2025)
- Area: 5,894 km^{2} (2025)

Current constituency
- Created: 1921
- Seats: List: 19 (2025–present); 18 (2021–2025); 16 (2013–2021); 15 (2005–2013); 12 (1985–2005); 10 (1973–1985); 7 (1921–1973)
- Members of the Storting: List: Henrik Asheim (H); Une Aina Bastholm (MDG); Ragnhild Bergheim (Ap); Kirsti Bergstø (SV); Kari Sofie Bjørnsen (H); Tonje Brenna (Ap); Anette Carnarius Elseth (FrP); Himanshu Gulati (FrP); Liv Gustavsen (FrP); Mani Hussaini (Ap); Hans Andreas Limi (FrP); Tobias Linge (Ap); Anne Kristine Linnestad (H); Marie Sneve Martinussen (R); Tuva Moflag (Ap); Marie Østensen (Ap); Abid Raja (V); Ida Lindtveit Røse (KrF); Tom Staahle (FrP); Tone Wilhelmsen Trøen (H)
- Created from: List: Aker; Bærum and Follo; Lower Romerike; Mellem Romerike; Upper Romerike

Akershus is one of the 19 multi-member constituencies of the Storting, the national legislature of Norway. The constituency was established in 1921 following the introduction of proportional representation for elections to the Storting. It is conterminous with the county of Akershus. The constituency currently elects 19 of the 169 members of the Storting using the open party-list proportional representation electoral system. At the 2025 parliamentary election it had 514,392 registered electors.

== Electoral system ==
Akershus currently elects 19 of the 169 members of the Storting using the open (Note: Although technically elections to the Storting have open lists, they are in effect closed lists as a majority of those voting for a party must make changes to the lists for the changes to take effect, which has never happened since the introduction of proportional representation in 1921, and as result candidates are elected in the order submitted by the party.) party-list proportional representation electoral system. Constituency seats are allocated by the County Electoral Committee using the Modified Sainte-Laguë method. Compensatory seats (seats at large or levelling seats) are calculated based on the national vote and are allocated by the National Electoral Committee using the Modified Sainte-Laguë method at the constituency level (one for each constituency). Only parties that reach the 4% national threshold compete for compensatory seats.

== Election results ==
=== Summary ===
Election	Communists K			Reds R / RV / FMS			Socialist Left SV / SF			Labour Ap			Greens MDG			Centre Sp / Bp / L			Liberals V			Christian Democrats KrF			Conservatives H			Progress FrP / ALP		
Election	Votes	%	Seats	Votes	%	Seats	Votes	%	Seats	Votes	%	Seats	Votes	%	Seats	Votes	%	Seats	Votes	%	Seats	Votes	%	Seats	Votes	%	Seats	Votes	%	Seats
2025				17,663	4.25%	1	21,536	5.18%	1	113,527	27.32%	6	22,528	5.42%	1	12,196	2.93%	0	22,543	5.42%	1	10,788	2.60%	0	80,782	19.44%	4	97,960	23.57%	5
2021				14,572	3.94%	1	25,240	6.82%	1	95,609	25.82%	5	17,461	4.72%	1	32,584	8.80%	2	25,393	6.86%	1	7,580	2.05%	0	101,439	27.39%	5	38,779	10.47%	2
2017				6,542	1.94%	0	17,859	5.30%	1	88,689	26.32%	5	12,459	3.70%	0	20,219	6.00%	1	21,853	6.48%	1	7,839	2.33%	0	104,451	30.99%	5	50,741	15.06%	3
2013				2,365	0.74%	0	11,305	3.52%	0	91,364	28.44%	5	9,804	3.05%	0	8,111	2.52%	0	20,217	6.29%	1	10,377	3.23%	0	108,860	33.89%	7	54,658	17.01%	3
2009				2,566	0.85%	0	17,040	5.67%	1	101,241	33.68%	5	1,181	0.39%	0	9,435	3.14%	0	14,688	4.89%	1	9,308	3.10%	0	69,505	23.12%	4	73,300	24.39%	4
2005				2,269	0.79%	0	22,555	7.85%	1	87,702	30.52%	5	480	0.17%	0	11,328	3.94%	0	21,834	7.60%	1	11,212	3.90%	0	59,181	20.60%	4	67,411	23.46%	4
2001	134	0.05%	0	1,902	0.70%	0	33,168	12.29%	2	63,643	23.58%	3	660	0.24%	0	8,747	3.24%	0	10,855	4.02%	0	21,446	7.94%	1	85,618	31.72%	4	38,830	14.38%	2
1997	119	0.04%	0	2,874	1.06%	0	15,404	5.69%	1	94,187	34.80%	5	976	0.36%	0	12,478	4.61%	0	10,853	4.01%	0	24,930	9.21%	1	58,993	21.80%	3	47,218	17.45%	2
1993				2,002	0.80%	0	16,505	6.57%	1	94,837	37.77%	5	670	0.27%	0	26,610	10.60%	1	8,699	3.46%	0	10,552	4.20%	0	66,674	26.55%	4	19,439	7.74%	1
1989				1,464	0.56%	0	26,295	9.98%	1	80,862	30.68%	4	1,353	0.51%	0	12,187	4.62%	0	7,634	2.90%	0	11,229	4.26%	0	81,140	30.79%	5	39,851	15.12%	2
1985	297	0.12%	0	1,183	0.48%	0	14,221	5.73%	1	85,864	34.62%	5				12,162	4.90%	1	6,880	2.77%	0	9,881	3.98%	0	102,360	41.27%	5	12,984	5.23%	0
1981	508	0.22%	0	1,575	0.68%	0	12,727	5.53%	0	76,112	33.09%	4				11,348	4.93%	0	7,881	3.43%	0	11,047	4.80%	0	92,069	40.03%	5	13,697	5.96%	1
1977	619	0.30%	0	1,362	0.66%	0	9,618	4.65%	0	83,303	40.25%	4				13,222	6.39%	1	6,458	3.12%	0	13,764	6.65%	1	71,740	34.67%	4	4,458	2.15%	0
1973				945	0.50%	0	22,359	11.87%	1	62,740	33.31%	3				15,369	8.16%	1	5,016	2.66%	0	13,178	7.00%	1	45,080	23.93%	3	13,040	6.92%	1
1969	1,554	0.89%	0				6,818	3.90%	0	79,458	45.48%	3				23,316	13.35%	1	18,399	10.53%	1				45,161	25.85%	2			
1965	1,879	1.24%	0				9,866	6.49%	0	64,882	42.65%	3				13,511	8.88%	1	16,243	10.68%	1	6,868	4.51%	0	38,878	25.56%	2			
1961	3,060	2.41%	0				6,537	5.14%	0	59,527	46.82%	4				12,177	9.58%	1	7,623	6.00%	0	7,725	6.08%	0	30,496	23.99%	2			
1957	4,083	3.55%	0							57,813	50.29%	4				11,301	9.83%	1	8,579	7.46%	0	7,717	6.71%	0	25,466	22.15%	2			
1953	5,988	5.64%	0							52,243	49.17%	4				11,755	11.06%	1	6,155	5.79%	0	7,892	7.43%	0	22,207	20.90%	2			
1949	7,164	7.24%	0							48,002	48.53%	4				11,335	11.46%	1	4,875	4.93%	0	7,212	7.29%	0	20,017	20.24%	2			
1945	20,015	13.26%	1							59,928	39.70%	3				9,177	6.08%	0	7,224	4.79%	0	16,179	10.72%	1	38,418	25.45%	2			
1936										64,483	49.36%	4				13,235	10.13%	1	4,398	3.37%	0				35,371	27.07%	2			
1933	748	0.68%	0							50,619	46.25%	4				13,698	12.52%	1	6,525	5.96%	0				29,820	27.25%	2			
1930	593	0.58%	0							40,947	40.07%	3				15,119	14.79%	1	5,374	5.26%	0				34,541	33.80%	3			
1927	1,044	1.21%	0							39,885	46.15%	3				11,352	13.13%	1	2,792	3.23%	0				20,426	23.63%	2			
1924	1,673	2.17%	0							18,689	24.22%	2				11,222	14.54%	1	3,080	3.99%	0				31,915	41.36%	3			
1921										12,728	20.78%	1				9,047	14.77%	1	3,205	5.23%	0				26,558	43.37%	4			

(Excludes compensatory seats. Figures in italics represent joint lists.)

=== Detailed ===
==== 2020s ====
===== 2025 =====
Results of the 2025 parliamentary election held on 8 September 2025:

Party		Votes	%	Seats		
Party		Votes	%	Con.	Com.	Tot.
Labour Party	Ap	113,527	27.32%	6	0	6
Progress Party	FrP	97,960	23.57%	5	0	5
Conservative Party	H	80,782	19.44%	4	0	4
Liberal Party	V	22,543	5.42%	1	0	1
Green Party	MDG	22,528	5.42%	1	0	1
Socialist Left Party	SV	21,536	5.18%	1	0	1
Red Party	R	17,663	4.25%	1	0	1
Centre Party	Sp	12,196	2.93%	0	0	0
Christian Democratic Party	KrF	10,788	2.60%	0	1	1
Pensioners' Party	PP	3,770	0.91%	0	0	0
Norway Democrats	ND	3,043	0.73%	0	0	0
Generation Party	GP	2,651	0.64%	0	0	0
Industry and Business Party	INP	1,737	0.42%	0	0	0
Conservative	K	1,317	0.32%	0	0	0
Peace and Justice	FOR	1,313	0.32%	0	0	0
Center Party	PS	1,147	0.28%	0	0	0
Welfare and Innovation Party	VIP	679	0.16%	0	0	0
DNI Party	DNI	438	0.11%	0	0	0
Valid votes		415,618	100.00%	19	1	20
Blank votes		3,037	0.72%			
Rejected votes – other		639	0.15%			
Total polled		419,294	81.51%			
Registered electors		514,392				

The following candidates were elected:

- Constituency seats - Henrik Asheim (H); Åsmund Grøver Aukrust (Ap); Une Aina Bastholm (MDG); Ragnhild Bergheim (Ap); Kirsti Bergstø (SV); Kari Sofie Bjørnsen (H); Tonje Brenna (Ap); Anette Carnarius Elseth (FrP); Himanshu Gulati (FrP); Liv Gustavsen (FrP); Mani Hussaini (Ap); Hans Andreas Limi (FrP); Anne Kristine Linnestad (H); Marie Sneve Martinussen (R); Tuva Moflag (Ap); Sverre Myrli (Ap); Abid Raja (V); Tom Staahle (FrP); and Tone Wilhelmsen Trøen (H).
- Compensatory seat - Ida Lindtveit Røse (KrF).

===== 2021 =====
Results of the 2021 parliamentary election held on 13 September 2021:

Party		Votes	%	Seats		
Party		Votes	%	Con.	Com.	Tot.
Conservative Party	H	101,439	27.39%	5	1	6
Labour Party	Ap	95,609	25.82%	5	0	5
Progress Party	FrP	38,779	10.47%	2	0	2
Centre Party	Sp	32,584	8.80%	2	0	2
Liberal Party	V	25,393	6.86%	1	0	1
Socialist Left Party	SV	25,240	6.82%	1	0	1
Green Party	MDG	17,461	4.72%	1	0	1
Red Party	R	14,572	3.94%	1	0	1
Christian Democratic Party	KrF	7,580	2.05%	0	0	0
Democrats in Norway		4,007	1.08%	0	0	0
Pensioners' Party	PP	2,286	0.62%	0	0	0
Health Party		1,161	0.31%	0	0	0
Center Party		953	0.26%	0	0	0
The Christians	PDK	719	0.19%	0	0	0
Capitalist Party		636	0.17%	0	0	0
People's Action No to More Road Tolls	FNB	634	0.17%	0	0	0
Industry and Business Party	INP	489	0.13%	0	0	0
Pirate Party of Norway		338	0.09%	0	0	0
Alliance - Alternative for Norway		309	0.08%	0	0	0
The Generation Party		112	0.03%	0	0	0
Valid votes		370,301	100.00%	18	1	19
Blank votes		2,372	0.64%			
Rejected votes – other		614	0.16%			
Total polled		373,287	79.24%			
Registered electors		471,106				

The following candidates were elected:

- Constituency seats - Henrik Asheim (H); Åsmund Grøver Aukrust (Ap); Une Aina Bastholm (MDG); Kirsti Bergstø (SV); Sigbjørn Gjelsvik (Sp); Himanshu Gulati (FrP); Anniken Huitfeldt (Ap); Mani Hussaini (Ap); Turid Kristensen (H); Hans Andreas Limi (FrP); Anne Kristine Linnestad (H); Marie Sneve Martinussen (R); Tuva Moflag (Ap); Sverre Myrli (Ap); Abid Raja (V); Else Marie Tveit Rødby (Sp); Jan Tore Sanner (H); and Tone Wilhelmsen Trøen (H).
- Compensatory seat - Hårek Elvenes (H).

==== 2010s ====
===== 2017 =====
Results of the 2017 parliamentary election held on 11 September 2017:

Party		Votes	%	Seats		
Party		Votes	%	Con.	Com.	Tot.
Conservative Party	H	104,451	30.99%	5	1	6
Labour Party	Ap	88,689	26.32%	5	0	5
Progress Party	FrP	50,741	15.06%	3	0	3
Liberal Party	V	21,853	6.48%	1	0	1
Centre Party	Sp	20,219	6.00%	1	0	1
Socialist Left Party	SV	17,859	5.30%	1	0	1
Green Party	MDG	12,459	3.70%	0	0	0
Christian Democratic Party	KrF	7,839	2.33%	0	0	0
Red Party	R	6,542	1.94%	0	0	0
Health Party		2,052	0.61%	0	0	0
Pensioners' Party	PP	1,954	0.58%	0	0	0
Capitalist Party		598	0.18%	0	0	0
Pirate Party of Norway		565	0.17%	0	0	0
The Christians	PDK	420	0.12%	0	0	0
The Alliance		383	0.11%	0	0	0
Democrats in Norway		268	0.08%	0	0	0
Coastal Party	KP	136	0.04%	0	0	0
Valid votes		337,028	100.00%	16	1	17
Blank votes		1,872	0.55%			
Rejected votes – other		558	0.16%			
Total polled		339,458	81.38%			
Registered electors		417,141				

The following candidates were elected:

- Constituency seats - Henrik Asheim (H); Åsmund Grøver Aukrust (Ap); Sigbjørn Gjelsvik (Sp); Himanshu Gulati (FrP); Anniken Huitfeldt (Ap); Nils Aage Jegstad (H); Kari Kjønaas Kjos (FrP); Turid Kristensen (H); Hans Andreas Limi (FrP); Tuva Moflag (Ap); Sverre Myrli (Ap); Abid Raja (V); Nina Sandberg (Ap); Jan Tore Sanner (H); Tone Wilhelmsen Trøen (H); and Nicholas Wilkinson (SV).
- Compensatory seat - Hårek Elvenes (H).

===== 2013 =====
Results of the 2013 parliamentary election held on 8 and 9 September 2013:

Party		Votes	%	Seats		
Party		Votes	%	Con.	Com.	Tot.
Conservative Party	H	108,860	33.89%	7	0	7
Labour Party	Ap	91,364	28.44%	5	0	5
Progress Party	FrP	54,658	17.01%	3	0	3
Liberal Party	V	20,217	6.29%	1	0	1
Socialist Left Party	SV	11,305	3.52%	0	1	1
Christian Democratic Party	KrF	10,377	3.23%	0	0	0
Green Party	MDG	9,804	3.05%	0	0	0
Centre Party	Sp	8,111	2.52%	0	0	0
Red Party	R	2,365	0.74%	0	0	0
Pensioners' Party	PP	1,557	0.48%	0	0	0
Pirate Party of Norway		1,106	0.34%	0	0	0
The Christians	PDK	792	0.25%	0	0	0
Christian Unity Party	KSP	197	0.06%	0	0	0
Liberal People's Party	DLF	195	0.06%	0	0	0
Coastal Party	KP	149	0.05%	0	0	0
Democrats in Norway		115	0.04%	0	0	0
Society Party		77	0.02%	0	0	0
Valid votes		321,249	100.00%	16	1	17
Blank votes		1,267	0.39%			
Rejected votes – other		436	0.14%			
Total polled		322,952	81.88%			
Registered electors		394,439				

The following candidates were elected:

- Constituency seats - Marianne Aasen (Ap); Henrik Asheim (H); Åsmund Grøver Aukrust (Ap); Gunvor Eldegard (Ap); Sylvi Graham (H); Anniken Huitfeldt (Ap); Nils Aage Jegstad (H); Kari Kjønaas Kjos (FrP); Hans Andreas Limi (FrP); Bente Stein Mathisen (H); Sverre Myrli (Ap); Abid Raja (V); Jan Tore Sanner (H); Ib Thomsen (FrP); Mette Tønder (H); and Tone Wilhelmsen Trøen (H).
- Compensatory seat - Bård Vegar Solhjell (SV).

==== 2000s ====
===== 2009 =====
Results of the 2009 parliamentary election held on 13 and 14 September 2009:

Party		Votes	%	Seats		
Party		Votes	%	Con.	Com.	Tot.
Labour Party	Ap	101,241	33.68%	5	0	5
Progress Party	FrP	73,300	24.39%	4	0	4
Conservative Party	H	69,505	23.12%	4	0	4
Socialist Left Party	SV	17,040	5.67%	1	0	1
Liberal Party	V	14,688	4.89%	1	0	1
Centre Party	Sp	9,435	3.14%	0	0	0
Christian Democratic Party	KrF	9,308	3.10%	0	1	1
Red Party	R	2,566	0.85%	0	0	0
Pensioners' Party	PP	1,595	0.53%	0	0	0
Green Party	MDG	1,181	0.39%	0	0	0
Christian Unity Party	KSP	307	0.10%	0	0	0
Democrats in Norway		164	0.05%	0	0	0
Coastal Party	KP	153	0.05%	0	0	0
One (Written) Language		103	0.03%	0	0	0
Valid votes		300,586	100.00%	15	1	16
Blank votes		1,286	0.43%			
Rejected votes – other		244	0.08%			
Total polled		302,116	80.43%			
Registered electors		375,622				

The following candidates were elected:

- Constituency seats - Marianne Aasen (Ap); Hans Frode Asmyhr (FrP); André Oktay Dahl (H); Gunvor Eldegard (Ap); Sylvi Graham (H); Morten Høglund (FrP); Anniken Huitfeldt (Ap); Gorm Kjernli (Ap); Kari Kjønaas Kjos (FrP); Sverre Myrli (Ap); Jan Tore Sanner (H); Sonja Irene Sjøli (H); Bård Vegar Solhjell (SV); Borghild Tenden (V); and Ib Thomsen (FrP).
- Compensatory seat - Knut Arild Hareide (KrF).

===== 2005 =====
Results of the 2005 parliamentary election held on 11 and 12 September 2005:

Party		Votes	%	Seats		
Party		Votes	%	Con.	Com.	Tot.
Labour Party	Ap	87,702	30.52%	5	0	5
Progress Party	FrP	67,411	23.46%	4	0	4
Conservative Party	H	59,181	20.60%	4	0	4
Socialist Left Party	SV	22,555	7.85%	1	0	1
Liberal Party	V	21,834	7.60%	1	0	1
Centre Party	Sp	11,328	3.94%	0	1	1
Christian Democratic Party	KrF	11,212	3.90%	0	0	0
Red Electoral Alliance	RV	2,269	0.79%	0	0	0
Pensioners' Party	PP	2,102	0.73%	0	0	0
Coastal Party	KP	559	0.19%	0	0	0
Green Party	MDG	480	0.17%	0	0	0
Abortion Opponents' List		265	0.09%	0	0	0
Christian Unity Party	KSP	250	0.09%	0	0	0
Democrats		132	0.05%	0	0	0
Reform Party		37	0.01%	0	0	0
Valid votes		287,317	100.00%	15	1	16
Blank votes		1,187	0.41%			
Rejected votes – other		262	0.09%			
Total polled		288,766	81.10%			
Registered electors		356,045				

The following candidates were elected:

- Constituency seats - Marianne Aasen (Ap); Hans Frode Asmyhr (FrP); Vidar Bjørnstad (Ap); André Oktay Dahl (H); Gunvor Eldegard (Ap); Morten Høglund (FrP); Anniken Huitfeldt (Ap); Kari Kjønaas Kjos (FrP); Sverre Myrli (Ap); Jan Petersen (H); Rolf Reikvam (SV); Jan Tore Sanner (H); Sonja Irene Sjøli (H); Borghild Tenden (V); and Ib Thomsen (FrP).
- Compensatory seat - Åslaug Haga (Sp).

===== 2001 =====
Results of the 2001 parliamentary election held on 9 and 10 September 2001:

Party		Votes	%	Seats		
Party		Votes	%	Con.	Com.	Tot.
Conservative Party	H	85,618	31.72%	4	1	5
Labour Party	Ap	63,643	23.58%	3	0	3
Progress Party	FrP	38,830	14.38%	2	1	3
Socialist Left Party	SV	33,168	12.29%	2	0	2
Christian Democratic Party	KrF	21,446	7.94%	1	0	1
Liberal Party	V	10,855	4.02%	0	0	0
Centre Party	Sp	8,747	3.24%	0	1	1
Pensioners' Party	PP	2,685	0.99%	0	0	0
Red Electoral Alliance	RV	1,902	0.70%	0	0	0
Coastal Party	KP	1,373	0.51%	0	0	0
Green Party	MDG	660	0.24%	0	0	0
Christian Unity Party	KSP	292	0.11%	0	0	0
Fatherland Party	FLP	267	0.10%	0	0	0
Norwegian People's Party	NFP	179	0.07%	0	0	0
Non-Partisan Coastal and Rural District Party		155	0.06%	0	0	0
Communist Party of Norway	K	134	0.05%	0	0	0
Valid votes		269,954	100.00%	12	3	15
Rejected votes		2,006	0.74%			
Total polled		271,960	79.08%			
Registered electors		343,896				

The following candidates were elected:

- Constituency seats - Siri Hall Arnøy (SV); Vidar Bjørnstad (Ap); Kjell Engebretsen (Ap); Ursula Evje (FrP); Grethe Fossli (Ap); Valgerd Svarstad Haugland (KrF); André Kvakkestad (FrP); Leif Frode Onarheim (H); Jan Petersen (H); Rolf Reikvam (SV); Jan Tore Sanner (H); and Sonja Irene Sjøli (H).
- Compensatory seats - Julie Christiansen (H); Åslaug Haga (Sp); and Morten Høglund (FrP).

==== 1990s ====
===== 1997 =====
Results of the 1997 parliamentary election held on 15 September 1997:

Party		Votes	%	Seats		
Party		Votes	%	Con.	Com.	Tot.
Labour Party	Ap	94,187	34.80%	5	0	5
Conservative Party	H	58,993	21.80%	3	0	3
Progress Party	FrP	47,218	17.45%	2	0	2
Christian Democratic Party	KrF	24,930	9.21%	1	0	1
Socialist Left Party	SV	15,404	5.69%	1	0	1
Centre Party	Sp	12,478	4.61%	0	1	1
Liberal Party	V	10,853	4.01%	0	1	1
Red Electoral Alliance	RV	2,874	1.06%	0	0	0
Pensioners' Party	PP	1,830	0.68%	0	0	0
Green Party	MDG	976	0.36%	0	0	0
Fatherland Party	FLP	298	0.11%	0	0	0
Natural Law Party		258	0.10%	0	0	0
White Electoral Alliance		159	0.06%	0	0	0
Communist Party of Norway	K	119	0.04%	0	0	0
Liberal People's Party	DLF	74	0.03%	0	0	0
Valid votes		270,651	100.00%	12	2	14
Rejected votes		1,117	0.41%			
Total polled		271,768	82.01%			
Registered electors		331,397				

The following candidates were elected:

- Constituency seats - Vidar Bjørnstad (Ap); Anneliese Dørum (Ap); Kjell Engebretsen (Ap); Ursula Evje (FrP); Grethe Fossli (Ap); Fridtjof Frank Gundersen (FrP); Valgerd Svarstad Haugland (KrF); Sverre Myrli (Ap); Jan Petersen (H); Rolf Reikvam (SV); Jan Tore Sanner (H); and Sonja Irene Sjøli (H).
- Compensatory seats - Anne Enger (Sp); and Terje Johansen (V).

===== 1993 =====
Results of the 1993 parliamentary election held on 12 and 13 September 1993:

Party		Votes	%	Seats		
Party		Votes	%	Con.	Com.	Tot.
Labour Party	Ap	94,837	37.77%	5	0	5
Conservative Party	H	66,674	26.55%	4	0	4
Centre Party	Sp	26,610	10.60%	1	0	1
Progress Party	FrP	19,439	7.74%	1	1	2
Socialist Left Party	SV	16,505	6.57%	1	0	1
Christian Democratic Party	KrF	10,552	4.20%	0	1	1
Liberal Party	V	8,699	3.46%	0	0	0
Pensioners' Party	PP	2,547	1.01%	0	0	0
Red Electoral Alliance	RV	2,002	0.80%	0	0	0
Fatherland Party	FLP	1,212	0.48%	0	0	0
New Future Coalition Party	SNF	922	0.37%	0	0	0
Green Party	MDG	670	0.27%	0	0	0
Natural Law Party		307	0.12%	0	0	0
Liberal People's Party	DLF	141	0.06%	0	0	0
Valid votes		251,117	100.00%	12	2	14
Rejected votes		1,195	0.47%			
Total polled		252,312	79.02%			
Registered electors		319,318				

The following candidates were elected:

- Constituency seats - Vidar Bjørnstad (Ap); Paul Chaffey (SV); Anneliese Dørum (Ap); Kjell Engebretsen (Ap); Anne Enger (Sp); Eva R. Finstad (H); Kaci Kullmann Five (H); Grethe Fossli (Ap); Fridtjof Frank Gundersen (FrP); Jan Petersen (H); Jan Tore Sanner (H); and Solveig Torsvik (Ap).
- Compensatory seats - Stephen Bråthen (FrP); and Valgerd Svarstad Haugland (KrF).

==== 1980s ====
===== 1989 =====
Results of the 1989 parliamentary election held on 10 and 11 September 1989:

Party		Votes	%	Seats		
Party		Votes	%	Con.	Com.	Tot.
Conservative Party	H	81,140	30.79%	5	0	5
Labour Party	Ap	80,862	30.68%	4	0	4
Progress Party	FrP	39,851	15.12%	2	1	3
Socialist Left Party	SV	26,295	9.98%	1	1	2
Centre Party	Sp	12,187	4.62%	0	1	1
Christian Democratic Party	KrF	11,229	4.26%	0	0	0
Liberal Party	V	7,634	2.90%	0	0	0
County Lists for Environment and Solidarity	FMS	1,464	0.56%	0	0	0
Green Party	MDG	1,353	0.51%	0	0	0
Stop Immigration	SI	1,342	0.51%	0	0	0
Liberals-Europe Party		116	0.04%	0	0	0
Free Elected Representatives		59	0.02%	0	0	0
Valid votes		263,532	100.00%	12	3	15
Rejected votes		715	0.27%			
Total polled		264,247	85.90%			
Registered electors		307,608				

The following candidates were elected:

- Constituency seats - Tora Aasland (SV); Jo Benkow (H); Helen Bøsterud (Ap); Anneliese Dørum (Ap); Eva R. Finstad (H); Kaci Kullmann Five (H); Fridtjof Frank Gundersen (FrP); Tore Haugen (H); Thor-Eirik Gulbrandsen Mykland (Ap); Jan Petersen (H); Reiulf Steen (Ap); and Finn Thoresen (FrP).
- Compensatory seats - Paul Chaffey (SV); Anne Enger (Sp); and Jan Erik Fåne (FrP).

===== 1985 =====
Results of the 1985 parliamentary election held on 8 and 9 September 1985:

Party		Party			List Alliance		
Party		Votes	%	Seats	Votes	%	Seats
Conservative Party	H	102,360	41.27%	6	102,360	41.49%	5
Labour Party	Ap	85,864	34.62%	5	85,864	34.80%	5
Centre Party	Sp	12,162	4.90%	0	22,401	9.08%	1
Christian Democratic Party	KrF	9,881	3.98%	0	22,401	9.08%	1
Liberal People's Party	DLF	1,648	0.66%	0	22,401	9.08%	1
Socialist Left Party	SV	14,221	5.73%	1	14,221	5.76%	1
Progress Party	FrP	12,984	5.23%	0	12,984	5.26%	0
Liberal Party	V	6,880	2.77%	0	6,880	2.79%	0
Red Electoral Alliance	RV	1,183	0.48%	0	1,183	0.48%	0
Pensioners' Party	PP	499	0.20%	0	499	0.20%	0
Communist Party of Norway	K	297	0.12%	0	297	0.12%	0
Free Elected Representatives		49	0.02%	0	49	0.02%	0
Valid votes		248,028	100.00%	12	246,738	100.00%	12
Rejected votes		323	0.13%				
Total polled		248,351	86.63%				
Registered electors		286,669					

As the list alliance was entitled to more seats contesting as an alliance than it was contesting as individual parties, the distribution of seats was as list alliance votes. The Sp-KrF-DLF list alliance's seat was allocated to the Centre Party.

The following candidates were elected: Tora Aasland (SV); Jo Benkow (H); Helen Bøsterud (Ap); Anneliese Dørum (Ap); Anne Enger (Sp); Kaci Kullmann Five (H); Terje Granerud (Ap); Carl Fredrik Lowzow (H); Thor-Eirik Gulbrandsen Mykland (Ap); Jan Petersen (H); Rolf Presthus (H); and Reiulf Steen (Ap).

===== 1981 =====
Results of the 1981 parliamentary election held on 13 and 14 September 1981:

Party		Votes	%	Seats
Conservative Party	H	92,069	40.03%	5
Labour Party	Ap	76,112	33.09%	4
Progress Party	FrP	13,697	5.96%	1
Socialist Left Party	SV	12,727	5.53%	0
Centre Party	Sp	11,348	4.93%	0
Christian Democratic Party	KrF	11,047	4.80%	0
Liberal Party	V	7,881	3.43%	0
Liberal People's Party	DLF	2,892	1.26%	0
Red Electoral Alliance	RV	1,575	0.68%	0
Communist Party of Norway	K	508	0.22%	0
Plebiscite Party		83	0.04%	0
Free Elected Representatives		66	0.03%	0
Valid votes		230,005	100.00%	10
Rejected votes		328	0.14%	
Total polled		230,333	86.44%	
Registered electors		266,471		

The following candidates were elected: Jo Benkow (H); Helen Bøsterud (Ap); Kaci Kullmann Five (H); Einar Førde (Ap); Terje Granerud (Ap); Fridtjof Frank Gundersen (FrP); Thor-Eirik Gulbrandsen Mykland (Ap); Carl Fredrik Lowzow (H); Jan Petersen (H); and Rolf Presthus (H).

==== 1970s ====
===== 1977 =====
Results of the 1977 parliamentary election held on 11 and 12 September 1977:

Party		Votes	%	Seats
Labour Party	Ap	83,303	40.25%	4
Conservative Party	H	71,740	34.67%	4
Christian Democratic Party	KrF	13,764	6.65%	1
Centre Party	Sp	13,222	6.39%	1
Socialist Left Party	SV	9,618	4.65%	0
Liberal Party	V	6,458	3.12%	0
Progress Party	FrP	4,458	2.15%	0
New People's Party	DNF	2,059	0.99%	0
Red Electoral Alliance	RV	1,362	0.66%	0
Communist Party of Norway	K	619	0.30%	0
Single Person's Party		172	0.08%	0
Norwegian Democratic Party		99	0.05%	0
Free Elected Representatives		69	0.03%	0
Valid votes		206,943	100.00%	10
Rejected votes		246	0.12%	
Total polled		207,189	86.80%	
Registered electors		238,698		

The following candidates were elected: Erland Asdahl (Sp); Jo Benkow (H); Helen Bøsterud (Ap); Thor Gystad (Ap); Anne-Olaug Ingeborgrud (KrF); Gerd Kirste (H); Carl Fredrik Lowzow (H); Thor-Eirik Gulbrandsen Mykland (Ap); Rolf Presthus (H); and Inger Louise Valle (Ap).

===== 1973 =====
Results of the 1973 parliamentary election held on 9 and 10 September 1973:

Party		Votes	%	Seats
Labour Party	Ap	62,740	33.31%	3
Conservative Party	H	45,080	23.93%	3
Socialist Electoral League	SV	22,359	11.87%	1
Centre Party	Sp	15,369	8.16%	1
Christian Democratic Party	KrF	13,178	7.00%	1
Anders Lange's Party	ALP	13,040	6.92%	1
New People's Party	DNF	9,946	5.28%	0
Liberal Party	V	5,016	2.66%	0
Red Electoral Alliance	RV	945	0.50%	0
Single Person's Party		420	0.22%	0
Women's Free Elected Representatives		170	0.09%	0
Norwegian Democratic Party		103	0.05%	0
Valid votes		188,366	100.00%	10
Rejected votes		273	0.14%	
Total polled		188,639	84.17%	
Registered electors		224,117		

The following candidates were elected: Egil Aarvik (KrF); Tønnes Andenæs (Ap); Jo Benkow (H); Erik Gjems-Onstad (ALP); Thor Gystad (Ap); Gerd Kirste (H); Sonja Ludvigsen (Ap); Rolf Presthus (H); Torild Skard (SV); and Bjørn Unneberg (Sp).

==== 1960s ====
===== 1969 =====
Results of the 1969 parliamentary election held on 7 and 8 September 1969:

Party		Votes	%	Seats
Labour Party	Ap	79,458	45.48%	3
Conservative Party	H	45,161	25.85%	2
Centre Party–Christian Democratic Party	Sp-KrF	23,316	13.35%	1
Liberal Party	V	18,399	10.53%	1
Socialist People's Party	SF	6,818	3.90%	0
Communist Party of Norway	K	1,554	0.89%	0
Wild Votes		1	0.00%	0
Valid votes		174,707	100.00%	7
Rejected votes		243	0.14%	
Total polled		174,950	87.73%	
Registered electors		199,417		

The following candidates were elected: Tønnes Andenæs (Ap); Jo Benkow (H); Thor Gystad (Ap); Halfdan Hegtun (V); Sonja Ludvigsen (Ap); Rolf Presthus (H); and Bjørn Unneberg (Sp-KrF).

===== 1965 =====
Results of the 1965 parliamentary election held on 12 and 13 September 1965:

Party		Votes	%	Seats
Labour Party	Ap	64,882	42.65%	3
Conservative Party	H	38,878	25.56%	2
Liberal Party	V	16,243	10.68%	1
Centre Party	Sp	13,511	8.88%	1
Socialist People's Party	SF	9,866	6.49%	0
Christian Democratic Party	KrF	6,868	4.51%	0
Communist Party of Norway	K	1,879	1.24%	0
Valid votes		152,127	100.00%	7
Rejected votes		569	0.37%	
Total polled		152,696	89.33%	
Registered electors		170,927		

The following candidates were elected: Kristian Asdahl (H); Jo Benkow (H); Hans Borgen (Sp); Thor Fossum (Ap); Halfdan Hegtun (V); Halvard Lange (Ap); and Sonja Ludvigsen (Ap).

===== 1961 =====
Results of the 1961 parliamentary election held on 11 September 1961:

Party		Votes	%	Seats
Labour Party	Ap	59,527	46.82%	4
Conservative Party	H	30,496	23.99%	2
Centre Party	Sp	12,177	9.58%	1
Christian Democratic Party	KrF	7,725	6.08%	0
Liberal Party	V	7,623	6.00%	0
Socialist People's Party	SF	6,537	5.14%	0
Communist Party of Norway	K	3,060	2.41%	0
Valid votes		127,145	100.00%	7
Rejected votes		548	0.43%	
Total polled		127,693	83.66%	
Registered electors		152,625		

The following candidates were elected: Kristian Asdahl (H), 30,493 votes; Hans Borgen (Sp), 12,178 votes; Thor Fossum (Ap), 59,520 votes; Halvard Lange (Ap), 59,519 votes; John Lyng (H), 30,488 votes; Hartvig Svendsen (Ap), 59,522 votes; and Liv Tomter (Ap), 59,519 votes.

==== 1950s ====
===== 1957 =====
Results of the 1957 parliamentary election held on 7 October 1957:

Party		Votes	%	Seats
Labour Party	Ap	57,813	50.29%	4
Conservative Party	H	25,466	22.15%	2
Farmers' Party	Bp	11,301	9.83%	1
Liberal Party	V	8,579	7.46%	0
Christian Democratic Party	KrF	7,717	6.71%	0
Communist Party of Norway	K	4,083	3.55%	0
Valid votes		114,959	100.00%	7
Rejected votes		551	0.48%	
Total polled		115,510	81.31%	
Registered electors		142,064		

The following candidates were elected: Hans Borgen (Bp); Hartvig Caspar Christie (H); Halvard Lange (Ap); John Lyng (H); Arne Torolf Strøm (Ap); Hartvig Svendsen (Ap); and Liv Tomter (Ap).

===== 1953 =====
Results of the 1953 parliamentary election held on 12 October 1953:

Party		Votes	%	Seats
Labour Party	Ap	52,243	49.17%	4
Conservative Party	H	22,207	20.90%	2
Farmers' Party	Bp	11,755	11.06%	1
Christian Democratic Party	KrF	7,892	7.43%	0
Liberal Party	V	6,155	5.79%	0
Communist Party of Norway	K	5,988	5.64%	0
Wild Votes		4	0.00%	0
Valid votes		106,244	100.00%	7
Rejected votes		509	0.48%	
Total polled		106,753	81.19%	
Registered electors		131,479		

The following candidates were elected: Kristian Asdahl (H); Hans Borgen (Bp); Hartvig Caspar Christie (H); Halvard Lange (Ap); Arne Torolf Strøm (Ap); Hartvig Svendsen (Ap); and Liv Tomter (Ap).

==== 1940s ====
===== 1949 =====
Results of the 1949 parliamentary election held on 10 October 1949:

Party		Votes	%	Seats
Labour Party	Ap	48,002	48.53%	4
Conservative Party	H	20,017	20.24%	2
Farmers' Party	Bp	11,335	11.46%	1
Christian Democratic Party	KrF	7,212	7.29%	0
Communist Party of Norway	K	7,164	7.24%	0
Liberal Party	V	4,875	4.93%	0
Society Party	Samfp	307	0.31%	0
Valid votes		98,912	100.00%	7
Rejected votes		582	0.58%	
Total polled		99,494	84.18%	
Registered electors		118,192		

The following candidates were elected: Hans Borgen (Bp); Hartvig Caspar Christie (H); Sverre Hope (H); Halvard Lange (Ap); Arne Torolf Strøm (Ap); Hartvig Svendsen (Ap); and Liv Tomter (Ap).

===== 1945 =====
Results of the 1945 parliamentary election held on 8 October 1945:

Party		Party			List Alliance		
Party		Votes	%	Seats	Votes	%	Seats
Labour Party	Ap	59,928	39.70%	3	59,928	39.71%	3
Conservative Party	H	38,418	25.45%	2	47,583	31.53%	2
Farmers' Party	Bp	9,177	6.08%	0	47,583	31.53%	2
Communist Party of Norway	K	20,015	13.26%	1	20,015	13.26%	1
Christian Democratic Party	KrF	16,179	10.72%	1	16,179	10.72%	1
Liberal Party	V	7,224	4.79%	0	7,224	4.79%	0
Valid votes		150,941	100.00%	7	150,929	100.00%	7
Rejected votes		1,440	0.94%				
Total polled		152,381	81.97%				
Registered electors		185,894					

As the list alliance was not entitled to more seats contesting as an alliance than it was contesting as individual parties, the distribution of seats was as party votes.

The following candidates were elected: Kirsten Hansteen (K); Sverre Hope (H); Trygve Lie (Ap); Herman Smitt Ingebretsen (H); Arne Torolf Strøm (Ap); Hartvig Svendsen (Ap); and Erling Wikborg (KrF).

==== 1930s ====
===== 1936 =====
Results of the 1936 parliamentary election held on 19 October 1936:

Party		Party			List Alliance		
Party		Votes	%	Seats	Votes	%	Seats
Labour Party	Ap	64,483	49.36%	4	64,483	49.36%	4
Conservative Party	H	35,371	27.07%	2	57,348	43.90%	3
Farmers' Party	Bp	13,235	10.13%	1	57,348	43.90%	3
Free-minded People's Party–Fatherland League	FF-Fl	8,755	6.70%	0	57,348	43.90%	3
Liberal Party	V	4,398	3.37%	0	4,398	3.37%	0
Nasjonal Samling	NS	3,573	2.73%	0	3,573	2.74%	0
Society Party	Samfp	826	0.63%	0	826	0.63%	0
Wild Votes		2	0.00%	0	2	0.00%	0
Valid votes		130,643	100.00%	7	130,630	100.00%	7
Rejected votes		923	0.70%				
Total polled		131,566	85.96%				
Registered electors		153,052					

As the list alliance was not entitled to more seats contesting as an alliance than it was contesting as individual parties, the distribution of seats was as party votes.

The following candidates were elected: Ole Ludvig Bærøe (H); Harald Halvorsen (Ap); Christian Ludvig Jensen (H); Bernt Korslund (Ap); Trygve Lie (Ap); Marta Marie Nielsen (Ap); and Jon Sundby (Bp).

===== 1933 =====
Results of the 1933 parliamentary election held on 16 October 1933:

Party		Party			List Alliance		
Party		Votes	%	Seats	Votes	%	Seats
Labour Party	Ap	50,619	46.25%	4	50,619	46.26%	4
Conservative Party	H	29,820	27.25%	2	29,820	27.25%	2
Farmers' Party	Bp	13,698	12.52%	1	21,255	19.43%	1
Free-minded People's Party	FF	4,369	3.99%	0	21,255	19.43%	1
Nasjonal Samling	NS	3,219	2.94%	0	21,255	19.43%	1
Liberal Party	V	6,525	5.96%	0	6,525	5.96%	0
Communist Party of Norway	K	748	0.68%	0	748	0.68%	0
Society Party	Samfp	227	0.21%	0	227	0.21%	0
Akershus Social Democratic Party		220	0.20%	0	220	0.20%	0
Wild Votes		5	0.00%	0	5	0.00%	0
Valid votes		109,450	100.00%	7	109,419	100.00%	7
Rejected votes		605	0.55%				
Total polled		110,055	78.78%				
Registered electors		139,699					

As the list alliance was not entitled to more seats contesting as an alliance than it was contesting as individual parties, the distribution of seats was as party votes.

The following candidates were elected: Ole Ludvig Bærøe (H); Harald Gram (H); Harald Halvorsen (Ap); Bernt Korslund (Ap); Knut Nordanger (Ap); Helga Ramstad (Ap); and Jon Sundby (Bp).

===== 1930 =====
Results of the 1930 parliamentary election held on 20 October 1930:

Party		Party			List Alliance		
Party		Votes	%	Seats	Votes	%	Seats
Labour Party	Ap	40,947	40.07%	3	40,947	40.13%	3
Conservative Party	H	34,541	33.80%	3	60,486	59.28%	4
Farmers' Party	Bp	15,119	14.79%	1	60,486	59.28%	4
Free-minded People's Party	FF	5,620	5.50%	0	60,486	59.28%	4
Liberal Party	V	5,374	5.26%	0	60,486	59.28%	4
Communist Party of Norway	K	593	0.58%	0	593	0.58%	0
Valid votes		102,194	100.00%	7	102,026	100.00%	7
Rejected votes		863	0.84%				
Total polled		103,057	79.95%				
Registered electors		128,904					

As the list alliance was not entitled to more seats contesting as an alliance than it was contesting as individual parties, the distribution of seats was as party votes.

The following candidates were elected: Finn Blakstad (H); Harald Gram (H); Harald Halvorsen (Ap); Thorleif Høilund (Ap); Knut Nordanger (Ap); Alf Staver (H); and Jon Sundby (Bp).

==== 1920s ====
===== 1927 =====
Results of the 1927 parliamentary election held on 17 October 1927:

Party		Votes	%	Seats
Labour Party	Ap	39,885	46.15%	3
Conservative Party	H	20,426	23.63%	2
Farmers' Party	Bp	11,352	13.13%	1
Free-minded Liberal Party	FV	10,930	12.65%	1
Liberal Party	V	2,792	3.23%	0
Communist Party of Norway	K	1,044	1.21%	0
Valid votes		86,429	100.00%	7
Rejected votes		611	0.70%	
Total polled		87,040	74.28%	
Registered electors		117,184		

The following candidates were elected: Harald Gram (H); Harald Halvorsen (Ap); Thorleif Høilund (Ap); Knut Nordanger (Ap); Jon Sundby (Bp); Rolf Thommessen (FV); and Anders Venger (H).

===== 1924 =====
Results of the 1924 parliamentary election held on 21 October 1924:

Party		Votes	%	Seats
Conservative Party	H	31,915	41.36%	3
Labour Party	Ap	18,689	24.22%	2
Farmers' Party	Bp	11,222	14.54%	1
Social Democratic Labour Party of Norway	S	10,576	13.71%	1
Liberal Party	V	3,080	3.99%	0
Communist Party of Norway	K	1,673	2.17%	0
Wild Votes		4	0.01%	0
Valid votes		77,159	100.00%	7
Rejected votes		785	1.01%	
Total polled		77,944	75.10%	
Registered electors		103,782		

The following candidates were elected: Olaf Bryn (H); Harald Halvorsen (S); Alfred Madsen (Ap); Peter Andreas Morell (H); Knut Nordanger (Ap); Jon Sundby (Bp); and Anders Venger (H).

===== 1921 =====
Results of the 1921 parliamentary election held on 24 October 1921:

Party		Votes	%	Seats
Conservative Party–Free-minded Liberal Party	H-FV	26,558	43.37%	4
Labour Party	Ap	12,728	20.78%	1
Norwegian Farmers' Association	L	9,047	14.77%	1
Social Democratic Labour Party of Norway	S	8,351	13.64%	1
Liberal Party	V	3,205	5.23%	0
Radical People's Party	RF	1,333	2.18%	0
Wild Votes		18	0.03%	0
Valid votes		61,240	100.00%	7
Rejected votes		651	1.05%	
Total polled		61,891	69.39%	
Registered electors		89,187		

The following candidates were elected: Jakob Brevig (H-FV); Olaf Bryn (H-FV); Harald Halvorsen (S); Alfred Madsen (Ap); Peter Andreas Morell (H-FV); Jon Sundby (L); and Anders Venger (H-FV).
