= Asdahl =

Asdahl is a Norwegian surname. Notable people with the surname include:

- Erland Asdahl (1921–1988), Norwegian politician
- Kristian Asdahl (1920–2000), Norwegian politician
