= Nils Aage Jegstad =

Norwegian politician (born 1950)

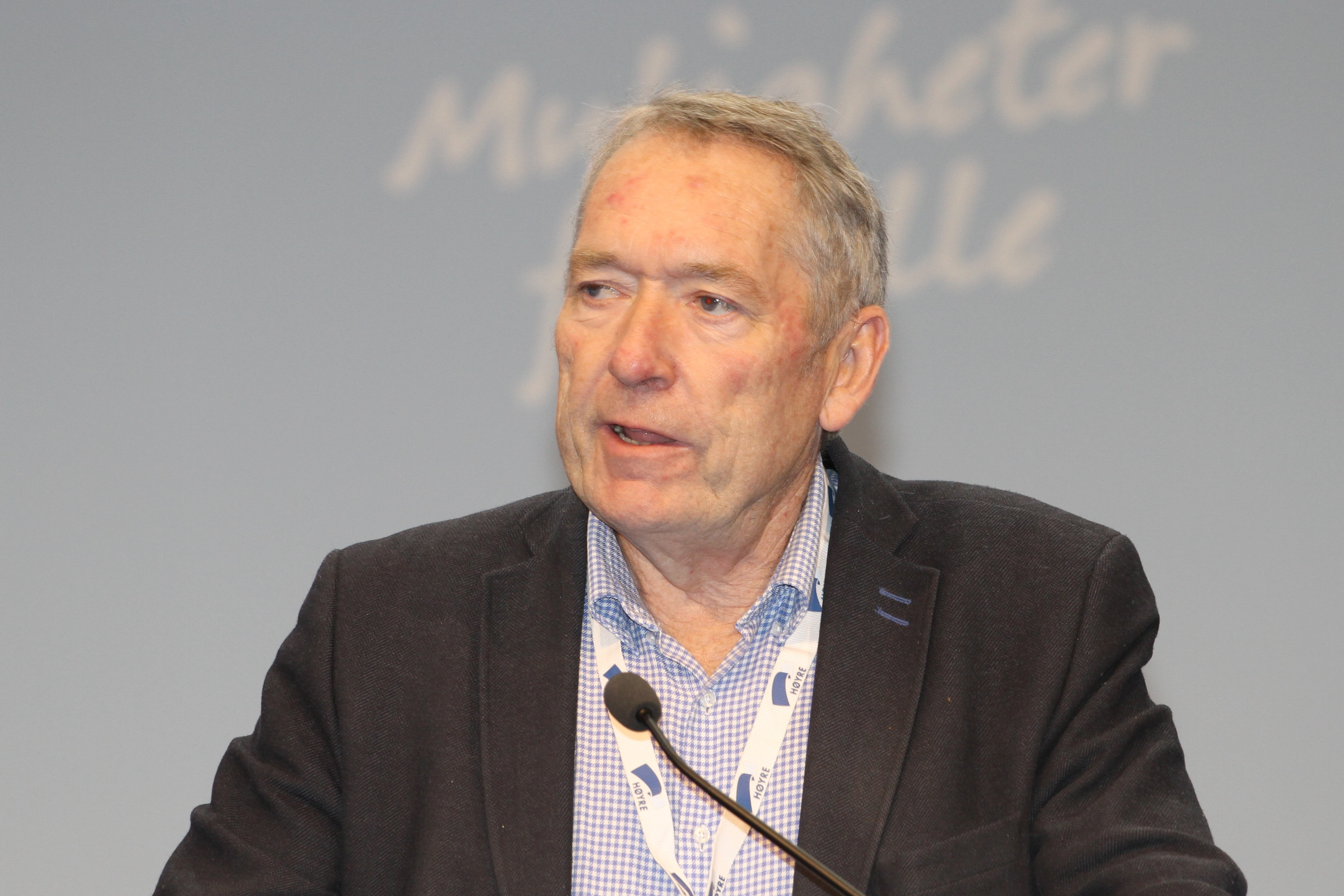
- Jegstad in 2017

Member of the Storting
- In office 1 October 2013 – 30 September 2021
- Constituency: Akershus

County mayor of Akershus
- In office 25 October 2007 – 23 September 2013
- Deputy: Inge Solli (V) (2007–2011); Lars Salvesen (KrF) (2011-2013)
- Preceded by: Hildur Horn Øien (KrF)
- Succeeded by: Anette Solli (H)

Deputy Member of the Storting
- In office 1 October 2005 – 30 September 2009
- Constituency: Akershus

Leader of the Akershus Conservative Party
- In office 2002–2008
- Deputy: Jan Tore Sanner; Hårek Elvenes
- Preceded by: Sonja Irene Sjøli
- Succeeded by: André Oktay Dahl

Mayor of Vestby
- In office 1 January 1988 – 18 October 1999
- Preceded by: Helge Bakke
- Succeeded by: Tom Anders Ludvigsen

Personal details
- Born: 12 December 1950 (age 74)
- Political party: Conservative
- Occupation: Politician

Nils Aage Jegstad (born 12 December 1950) is a Norwegian politician for the Conservative Party.

He served as a deputy representative to the Storting from Akershus during the term 2005–2009.

He was also the leader of the Akershus Conservative Party from 2002 to 2008.

On the local level, he was first elected to Vestby municipality council in 1976, and served as mayor from 1987 to 1999. In 1995 he was elected for the first time to the county council. Following the 2007 elections, Jegstad became the new county mayor (fylkesordfører) of Akershus. He was re-elected in 2011 and continued to serve as county mayor until the 2013 election when he was elected to the Storting.

He was re-elected to the Storting in 2017, but he did not seek re-election in 2021.
