= Anita Patel =

Norwegian politician (born 1971)

Deputy Member of the Storting
- In office 1 October 2021 – 30 September 2025
- Constituency: Akershus

Personal details
- Born: 3 April 1971 (age 55)
- Party: Labour

Anita Patel (born 3 April 1971) is a Norwegian politician for the Labour Party.

She served as a deputy representative to the Storting from Akershus during the term 2021–2025. In total she met during 62 days of parliamentary session.

Outside of politics, she is a member of the executive committee of Lørenskog municipal council. In September 2026, she was chosen to be the mayoral candidate for the Labour Party in Lørenskog for the upcoming election in 2027.

She is a social anthropologist by education and a schoolteacher by profession.
