= Tomter (surname) =

Tomter is a surname. Notable people with the surname include:

- Andrine Tomter (born 1995), Norwegian footballer
- Jørn Tomter (born 1975), Norwegian photographer
- Lars Anders Tomter (born 1959), Norwegian viola player
- Liv Tomter (1901–1978), Norwegian politician
