= Kari Kjønaas Kjos =

Norwegian politician (born 1962)

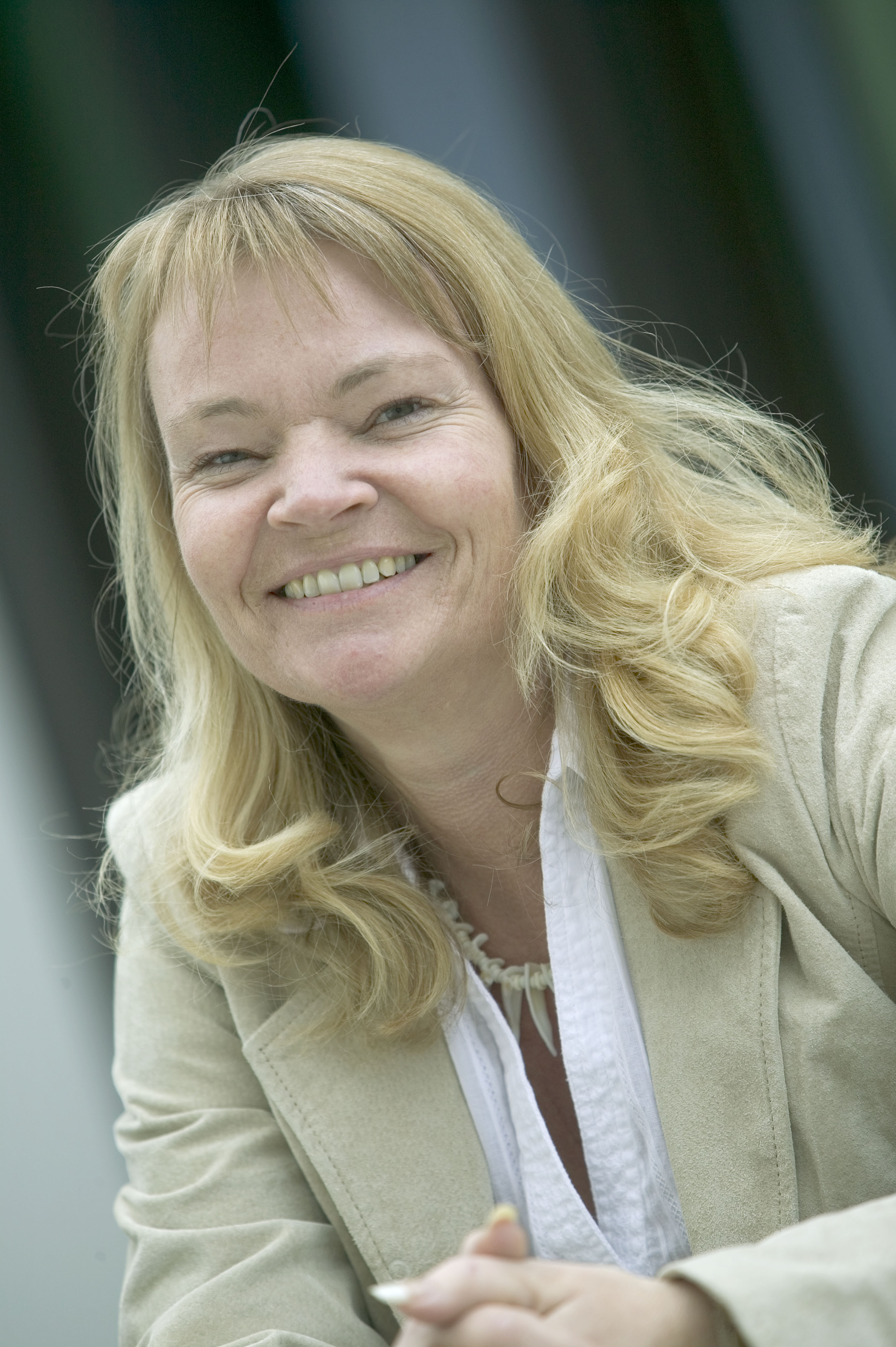

Personal details
- Party: Progress Party (Norway)
- Education: BI Norwegian Business School

Kari Kjønaas Kjos (born 25 January 1962, in Oslo) is a Norwegian politician representing the Progress Party. She is a representative of Akershus in the Storting since 2005 where she since 2013 has chairs the Standing Committee on Health and Care Services.

She has worked as assistant in kindergartens and had administrative positions in business. She studied economics at BI Norwegian Business School 1993–95. She worked for the Progress Party at district level between 2000 and 2005.

== Storting committees ==
- 2005–2009 member of the Standing Committee on Labour and Social Affairs.
- 2009–2013 member of the Standing Committee on Health and Care Services.
- 2013–current chair of the Standing Committee on Health and Care Services.
