= Gunvor Eldegard =

Norwegian politician (born 1963)

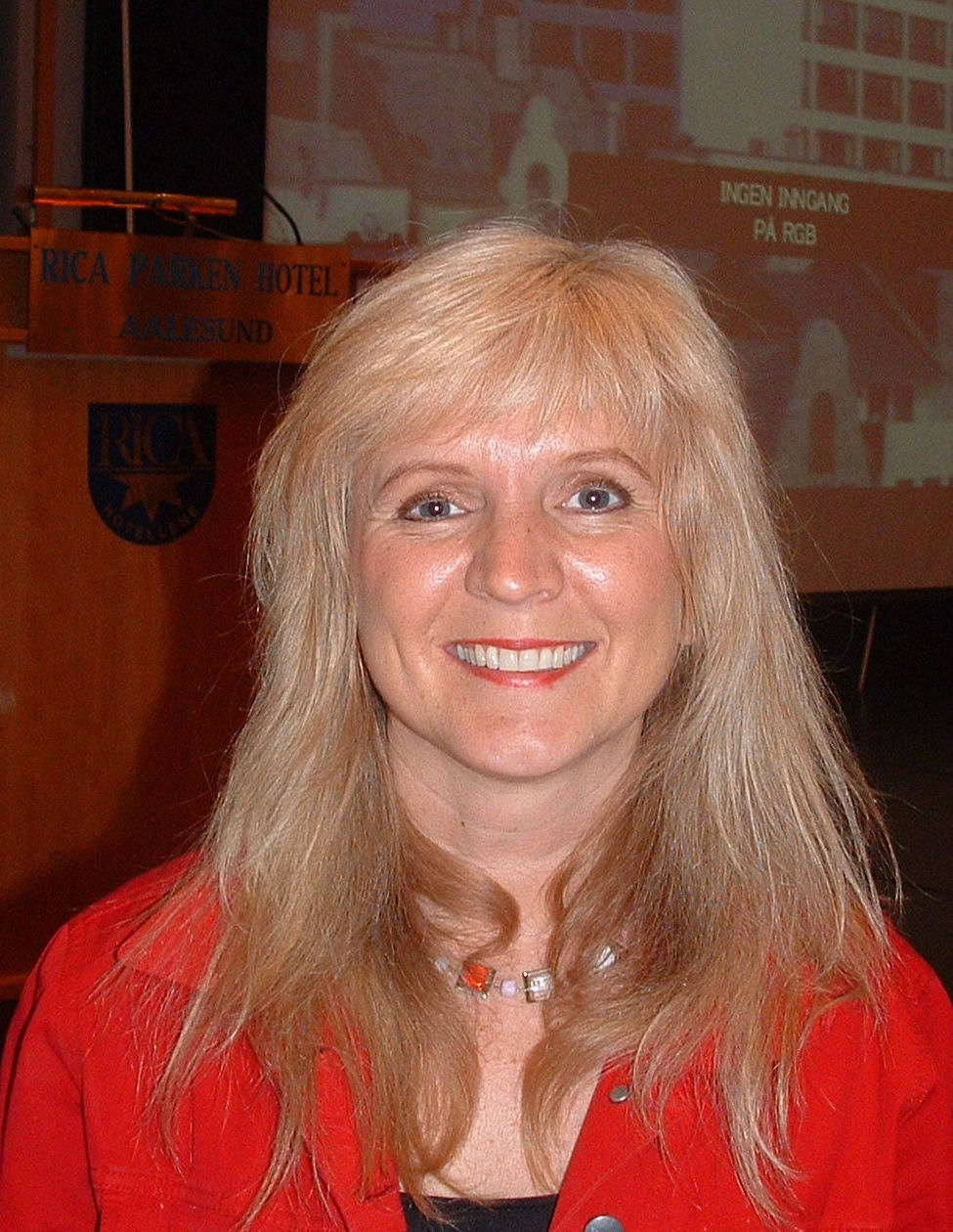
- Born: 14 April 1963 (age 63); Årdal Municipality, Norway
- Occupation: politician

Gunvor Eldegard (born 14 April 1963 in Årdal Municipality) is a Norwegian politician for the Labour Party.

She was elected to the Norwegian Parliament from Akershus in 2005. On the local level Eldegard was a member of the executive committee of the municipal council of Ski Municipality from 1999 to 2003, and then served as mayor to 2005.
