= Vidar Bjørnstad =

Norwegian politician (born 1955)

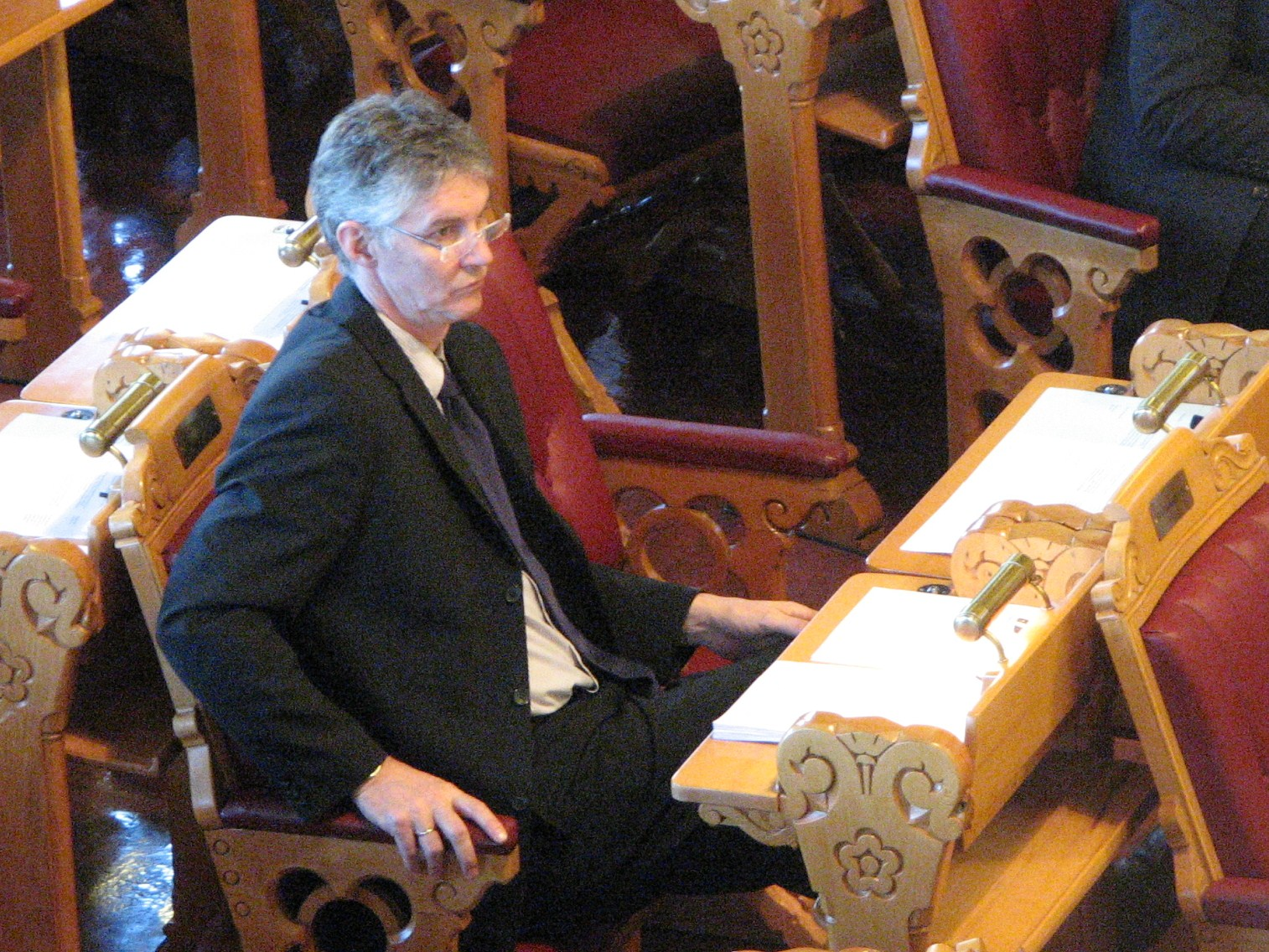

Personal details
- Party: Labour Party
- Education: George Washington University; University of Oslo

Vidar Bjørnstad (born 1 September 1955 in Tolga Municipality) is a Norwegian politician for the Labour Party.

== Career ==
He graduated with the cand.mag. degree from the University of Oslo in 1979. He later studied briefly at the George Washington University. From 1986 to 1987, during the second cabinet Brundtland, he was appointed personal secretary for the Minister of Foreign Development. He also worked in Amnesty International and the Norwegian Confederation of Trade Unions.

He was elected to the Norwegian Parliament from Akershus in 1993, and was re-elected on three occasions. On the local level he was a deputy member of the municipal council for Bærum Municipality from 1991 to 1995.
