= Rikke Lind =

Norwegian politician (born 1968)

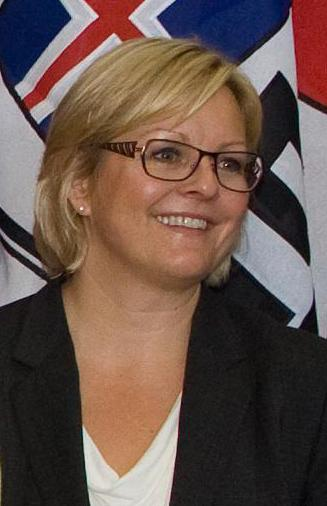
Rikke Lind (June 2011)

Rikke Lind (born 27 June 1968) is a Norwegian politician for the Labour Party.

She was born in Oslo as a daughter of an independent businessperson. She finished her secondary education at Nesodden in 1988 and graduated as a teacher from Oslo University College in 1995. She became involved in politics in the 1980s, as a board member of the Workers' Youth League in Nesodden from 1986 to 1987. She chaired the county branch from 1988 to 1989, and was also a political secretary in the Workers' Youth League nationwide before becoming office manager in the organization from 1989 to 1992.

She has been a board member of Norges Gymnasiastsamband from 1987 to 1988, later deputy chair of the county school board from 1992 to 1996 and county transport board from 1996 to 1999. She was a member of the executive committee in Akershus county council from 1991 to 1999, and a deputy member of Nesodden municipal council from 1995 to 2003. She was a national board member of the Labour Party from 1994 to 1996, and worked as a political adviser for their parliamentary group from 1997 to 1999. She served as a deputy representative to the Parliament of Norway from Akershus during the term 1997–2001. In November 2000, regular representative Anneliese Dørum died and was replaced by Lind for the remainder of the term.

She was an adviser in the Norwegian Electricity Industry Association from 2001 to 2002, then worked in the Norwegian Shipowners' Association for a year before being managing director in the Maritime Forum of Norway from 2003 to 2007. From 2007 to 2012 Lind served as a State Secretary in the Norwegian Ministry of Trade and Industry as a part of Stoltenberg's Second Cabinet. In 2012 she became secretary-general in the Norwegian Society for Sea Rescue.

Lind chaired Stor-Oslo lokaltrafikk from 1996 to 2000 and was a board member of the Norwegian State Educational Loan Fund from 2006 to 2007.
