= Else Marie Tveit Rødby =

Norwegian politician (born 1982)

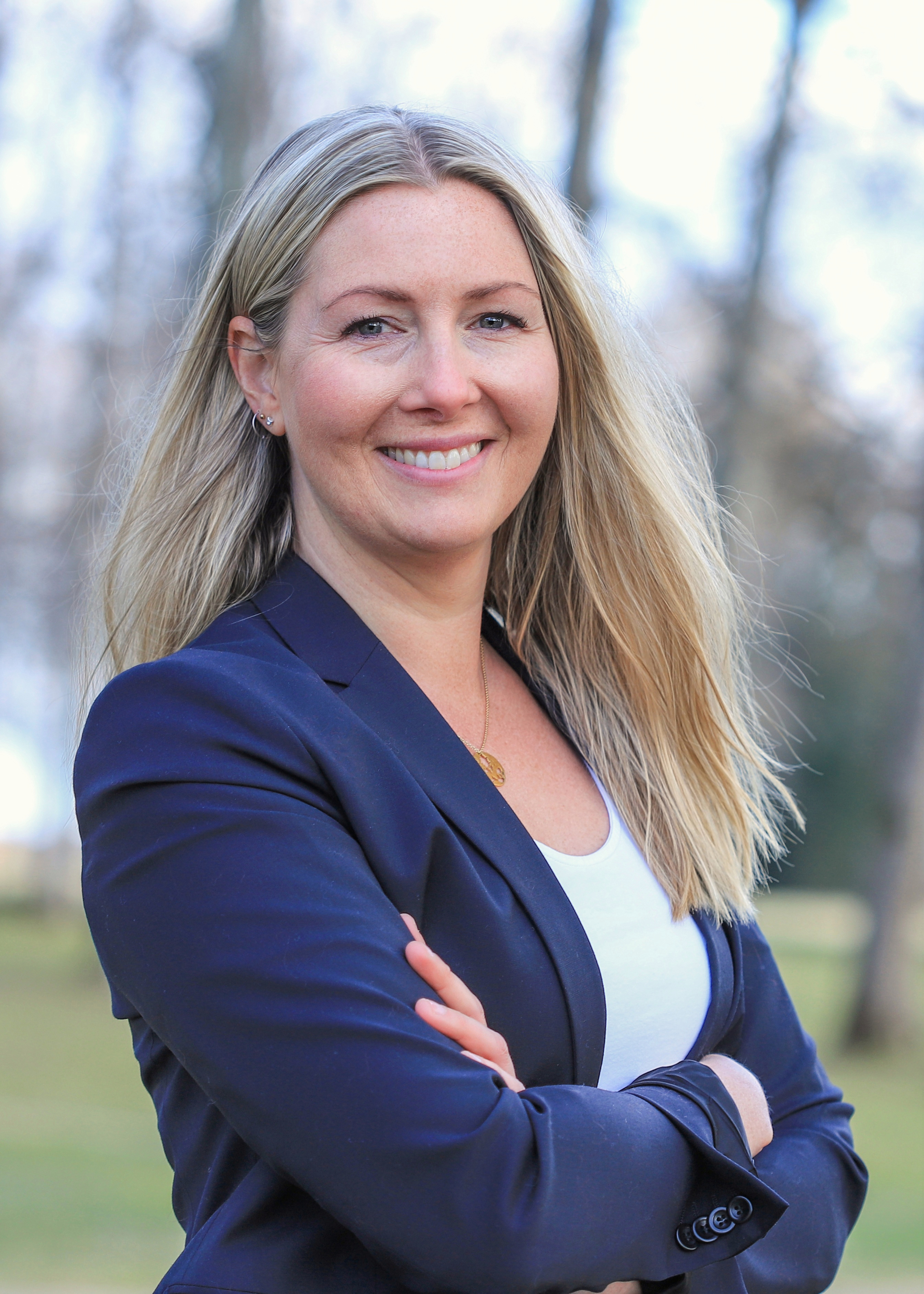
- Born: 26 May 1982 (age 44)
- Education: Jurisprudence
- Alma mater: University of Oslo
- Occupation: Politician
- Political party: Centre Party

Else Marie Tveit Rødby (born 26 May 1982) is a Norwegian politician for the Centre Party. She has been a member of the Storting since 2021.

== Biography ==
Rødby was elected representative to the Storting from the constituency of Akershus for the period 2021–2025, for the Centre Party. In the Storting, she is a member of the Standing Committee on Justice for the period 2021 to 2025.

Rødby graduated in jurisprudence from the University of Oslo, and is also a farmer.
