= Liv Gustavsen =

Norwegian politician (born 1967)

Member of the Storting
- Incumbent
- Assumed office 1 October 2025
- Constituency: Akershus

Deputy County Mayor of Akershus
- In office 17 October 2023 – 25 September 2025
- Mayor: Thomas Sjøvold
- Preceded by: Position re-established
- Succeeded by: Ole Jacob Johansen

Personal details
- Born: 13 March 1967 (age 59)
- Party: Progress

Liv Thon Gustavsen (born 13 March 1967) is a Norwegian politician for the Progress Party.

== Political career ==
=== Parliament ===
She served as a deputy representative to the Storting from Akershus from 2017 to 2021. She was elected as a regular representative in 2025.

=== Local politics ===
Hailing from Årnes, she joined the Progress Party in 2008. In 2011, she became deputy member of Nes municipal council, in 2015 she became a full member as well as deputy member of Akershus county council, and in 2016 she succeeded Hans Andreas Limi as chair of Akershus Progress Party.

Following the 2023 local elections, she became the new deputy county mayor of the newly re-established Akershus, serving under Conservative Thomas Sjøvold. She resigned after being elected to the Storting again at the 2025 parliamentary election and was succeeded by Ole Jacob Johansen.

== Personal life ==
She resided for many years in Haga and chaired the local sports club Haga IF. Outside of politics, she has spent her entire career in South African Pulp and Paper Industries.
