= André Kvakkestad =

Norwegian lawyer and politician

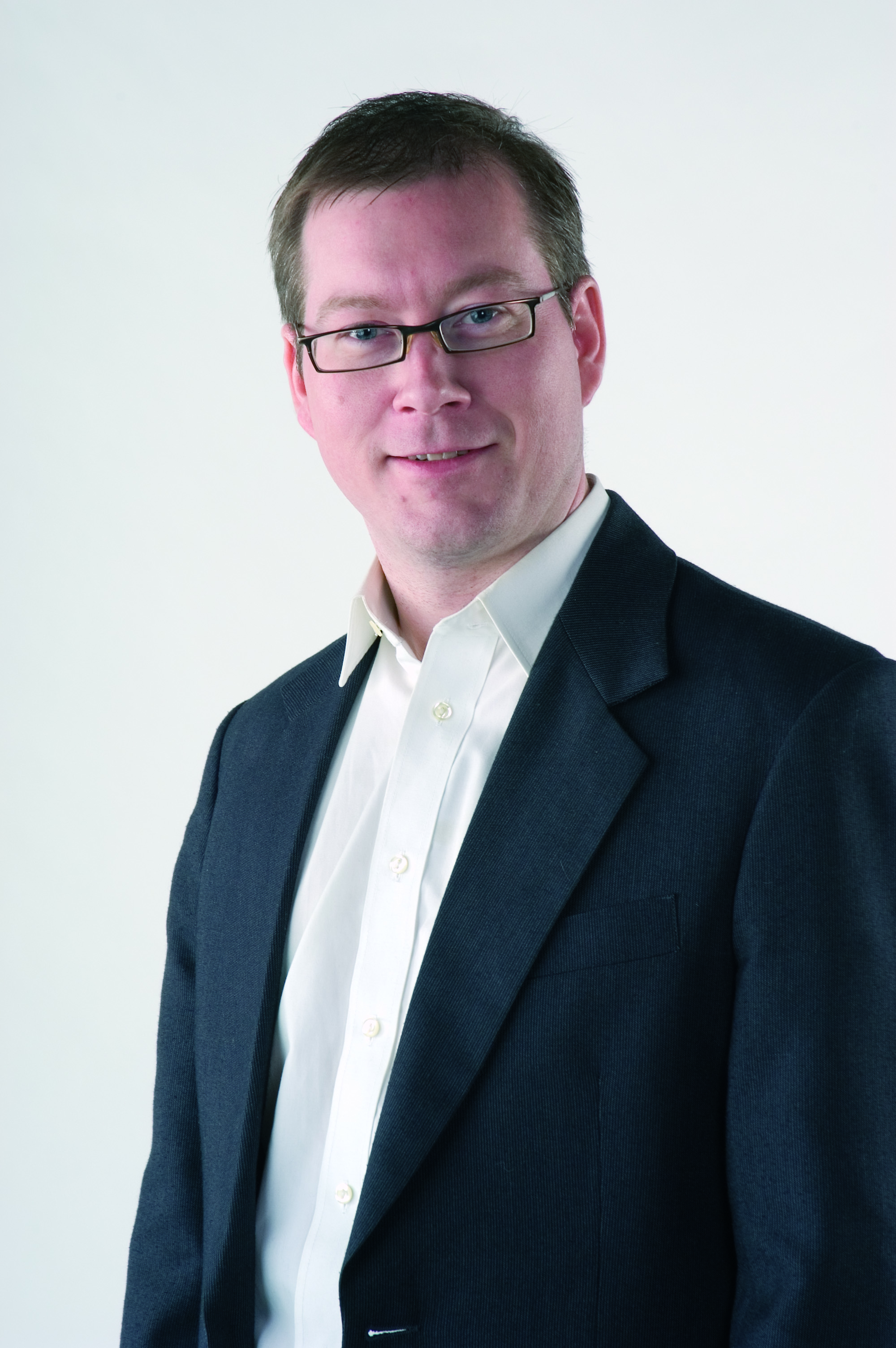

Deputy Mayor of Ski Municipality
- In office 2011–2015
- Mayor: Anne Kristine Linnestad (H)
- Preceded by: Anne-Gunn Steen Røse (KrF)
- Succeeded by: Camilla Edi Hille (V)

Member of the Storting
- In office 1 October 2001 – 30 September 2005
- Constituency: Akershus

Representative of the Parliamentary Assembly of the Council of Europe
- In office 2001–2005

Deputy Member of the Storting
- In office 1 October 1997 – 30 September 2001
- Constituency: Akershus

Personal details
- Party: Progress
- Occupation: Lawyer

André Kvakkestad (born 28 October 1971) is a Norwegian lawyer and politician for the Progress Party.

== Early life and education ==
Kvakkestad was born in Oslo as the son of director Willy R. Rahm and manager Elisabeth S. Kvakkestad. He attended Hebekk School (1978–84), Ski Lower Secondary School (1984–87), Ski Upper Secondary School (1987–1990) and studied law at the University of Oslo from 1990 to 1995. Since 2007, he has held a license as a lawyer.

== Political career ==
He has been a member Ski Municipal Council since 1991, the first two years as a regularly meeting deputy, and sat on the executive board from 1993 to 2003 and since 2006. He was a member of Akershus County Council from 1995 to 2003, and also sat on the executive board those years. From 1999 to 2003, he sat on the Akershus board of the Norwegian Association of Local and Regional Authorities. He was chair of Ski Progress Party from 1999 to 2001 and from 2006 to 2007. From 1997 to 2001, Kvakkestad was a deputy member of the Parliament of Norway for Akershus, and from 2000 to 2001 worked as an advisor for the parliamentary group. From 2001 to 2005, he was a regular member of parliament where he sat in the Standing Committee on Justice. He also participated in the parliamentary delegation to the European Council.

Prior to the 2005 Norwegian parliamentary election, the nomination committee of Akershus Progress Party wanted Kvakkestad as their top candidate for the election. The local chapter in Romerike held a secret meeting, without inviting members from Skedsmo or other parts of Akershus. At the nomination meeting, Kvakkestad and the other three top candidates were removed and replaced by people from Skedsmo. Kvakkestad stated afterwards that he felt that there had been a campaign against him intending to remove him as member of parliament due to him being gay.

== Personal life ==
After retiring from parliament, Kvakkestad worked as a lawyer at Ingfrid O. Tveit from 2006 to 2007, and after that as a sole proprietor, He is married and currently resides in Ski, Akershus. Kvakkestad is openly gay.
