= Tom Staahle =

Norwegian politician

Member of the Storting
- Incumbent
- Assumed office 1 October 2025
- Constituency: Akershus

Akershus commissioner of finance
- In office 17 October 2023 – 25 September 2025
- Gov. Mayor: Anette Solli (H)
- Succeeded by: Tonje Lavik Pederssen (FrP)

Mayor of Ullensaker
- In office 20 October 2015 – 30 September 2019
- Deputy: Willy Kvilten (H)
- Preceded by: Harald Espelund (FrP)
- Succeeded by: Eyvind Jørgensen Schumacher (Ap)

Personal details
- Born: 30 December 1972 (age 52)
- Political party: Progress

Tom Staahle (born 30 December 1972) is a Norwegian politician for the Progress Party.

He served as a deputy representative to the Parliament of Norway from Akershus during the terms 2005–2009 and 2009–2013. In total he met during 87 days of parliamentary session. He hails from Ullensaker where he has chaired the local party.

From 2015 to 2019, Staahle served as mayor of Ullensaker. From November 2019 to January 2020 he was a State Secretary in the Ministry of Local Government. Following the 2023 Norwegian local elections, the Progress Party managed to form a county cabinet together with its coalition partners, led by Anette Solli. The county cabinet would preside over Akershus County Municipality, following the dissolution of Viken on 1 January 2024. Staahle was selected as county commissioner of finance. He served under this role until the 2025 Norwegian parliamentary election, where Staahle was elected as a regular representantive to the Parliament of Norway from Akershus. Tonje Lavik Pederssen succeeded him as the new Akershus county commissioner of finance.
