= Thor-Eirik Gulbrandsen Mykland =

Norwegian politician (1940–2014)

Thor-Eirik Gulbrandsen

Member of the Storting from Akershus
- In office 1977–1989

Personal details
- Born: July 15, 1940 Fjære Municipality, Norway
- Died: July 25, 2014 (aged 74)
- Party: Labour Party
- Profession: Politician

Thor-Eirik Gulbrandsen (15 July 1940 – 25 July 2014) was a Norwegian politician for the Labour Party.

Gulbrandsen was born in Fjære Municipality. He was elected to the Norwegian Parliament from Akershus in 1977, and was re-elected on three occasions. He had previously served in the position of deputy representative during the terms 1969–1973 and 1973–1977. During his second term as a deputy, he filled in for Sonja Aase Ludvigsen meanwhile she was appointed to the Cabinet, and then replaced her permanently when she died in July 1974.

Gulbrandsen was a deputy member of the executive committee of the municipal council of Skedsmo Municipality during the term 1967–1971, and a member of the council from 1999–2003. In 1999, he was expelled from the Labor Party after he supported a rival candidate for mayor of Skedsmo Municipality.

After he retired from national politics, he took on the last name "Gulbrandsen Mykland".

He died on 25 July 2014.
