= Anne Kristine Linnestad =

Norwegian politician (born 1961)

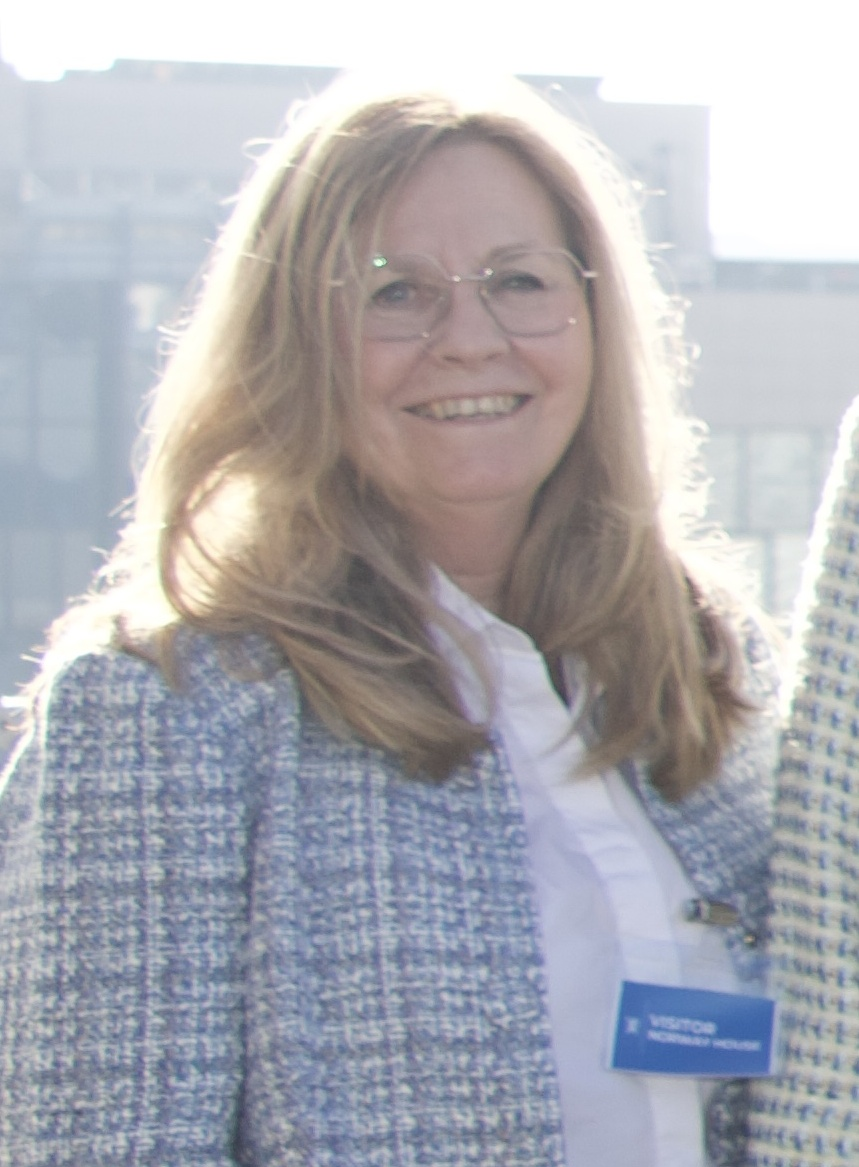

Member of the Storting
- Incumbent
- Assumed office 1 October 2021
- Constituency: Akershus

Deputy Member of the Storting
- In office 1 October 2017 – 30 September 2021
- Deputising for: Henrik Asheim (2017, 2020–2021)
- Constituency: Akershus

Mayor of Ski Municipality
- In office October 2011 – 28 October 2015
- Deputy: André Kvakkestad
- Preceded by: Georg Stub
- Succeeded by: Tuva Moflag

Personal details
- Born: 19 December 1961 (age 64)
- Party: Conservative
- Occupation: Politician

Anne Kristine Linnestad (born 19 December 1961) is a Norwegian politician.

== Political career ==
Linnestad was elected deputy representative to the Storting for the period 2017–2021 for the Conservative Party. She replaced Henrik Asheim at the Storting from October to November 2017, and again from 2020 when Asheim took a cabinet seat.

She was elected ordinary member to the Storting from the constituency of Akershus from September 2021. She was reelected representative to the Storting from Akershus for the period 2025–2029.

Linnestad was a member of Ski municipal council from 1999 to 2019, serving as mayor from 2011 to 2015. In 2020 Ski municipality was merged into Nordre Follo, and Linnestad continued in the municipal council there.
