= Turid Kristensen =

Norwegian politician (born 1966)

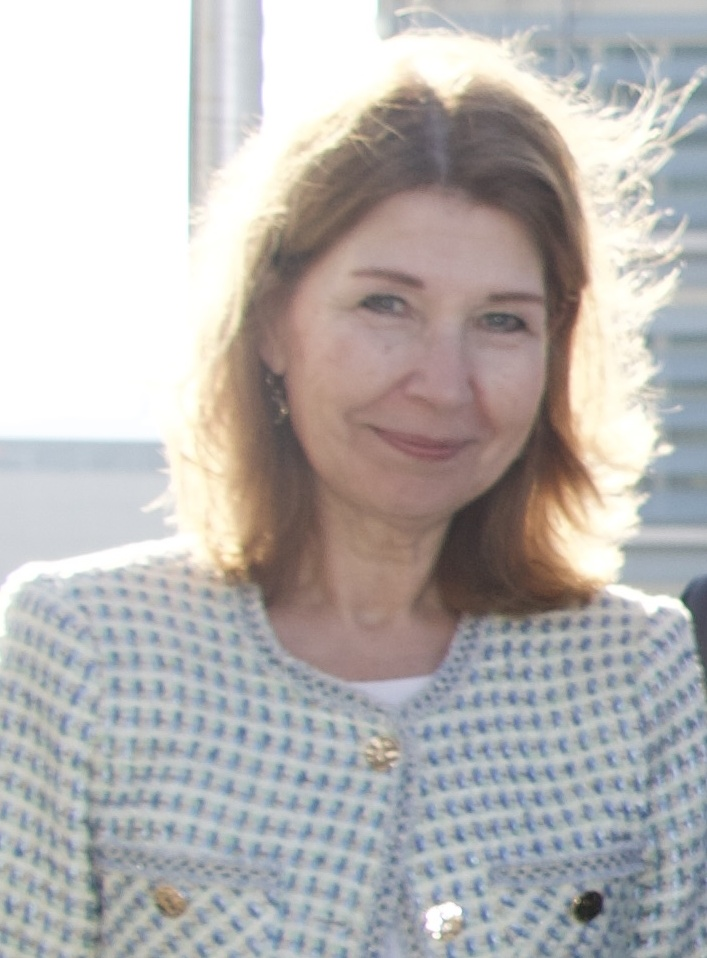

Member of the Storting
- In office 1 October 2017 – 30 September 2025
- Constituency: Akershus

Personal details
- Born: 8 October 1966 (age 59)
- Party: Conservative Party
- Occupation: Politician

Turid Kristensen (born 8 October 1966) is a Norwegian politician for the Conservative Party (H). She was a member of the Storting between 2017 and 2025.

== Biography ==
Born on 8 October 1966, Kristensen is educated in business economics, and was assigned with the University of Oslo from 1987.

Kristensen was the Conservative Party group leader in Lørenskog municipal council between 2007 and 2017, and she was also their mayor candidate in 2011 and 2015.

She was elected representative to the Storting from the constituency of Akershus for the period 2017–2021 for the Conservative Party, and re-elected in 2021. She wanted to seek re-election for the 2025 Election, but got passed over for a different candidate and thus was unable to seek re-election.

In the Storting, she was a member of the Standing Committee on Education and Research from 2017 to 2021, and the Standing Committee on Family and Cultural Affairs from 2021 to 2025.
