= Ib Thomsen =

Norwegian politician (born 1961)

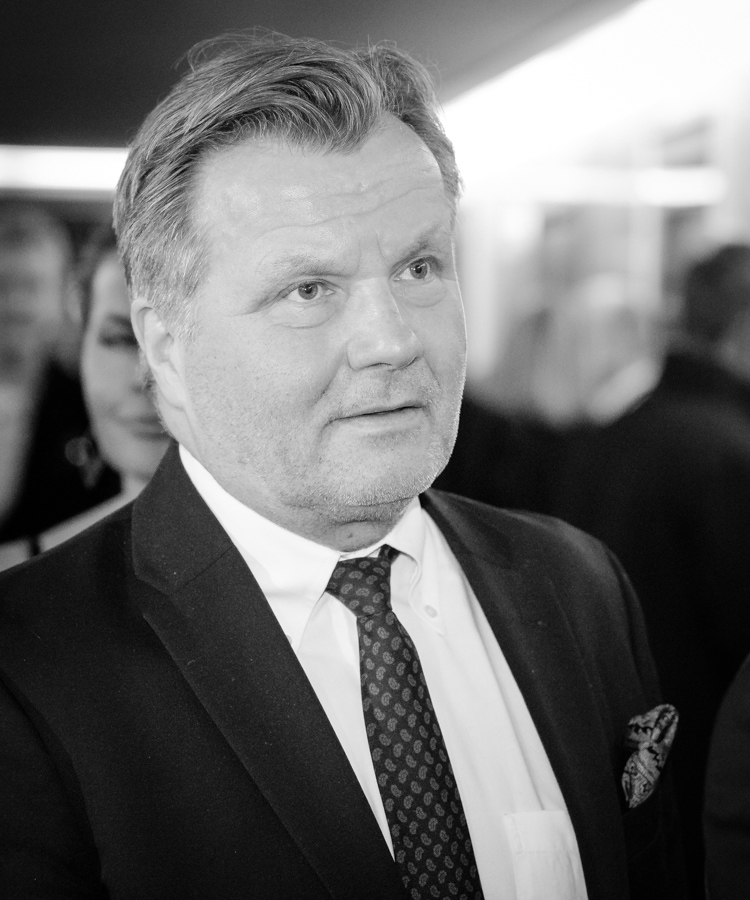

Member of the Storting
- In office 1 October 2005 – 30 September 2017
- Constituency: Akershus

Personal details
- Born: 6 October 1961 (age 64) Denmark
- Party: Progress

Ib Thomsen (born 6 October 1961) is a Norwegian politician representing the Progress Party. He was a representative of Akershus at the Storting between 2005 and 2017.

== Storting committees ==
- 2005–2009 member of the Municipality and Distribution committee.
