= Sverre Myrli =

Norwegian politician

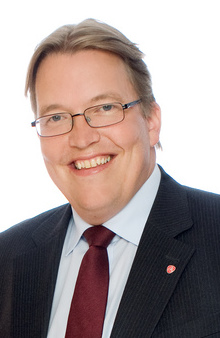

Fourth Vice President of the Storting
- In office 9 October 2021 – 25 November 2021
- President: Eva Kristin Hansen
- Preceded by: Nils T. Bjørke
- Succeeded by: Kari Henriksen

Member of the Storting
- Incumbent
- Assumed office 1 October 2005
- Constituency: Akershus
- In office 1 October 1997 – 30 September 2001
- Constituency: Akershus

Deputy Member of the Storting
- In office 1 October 2001 – 30 September 2005
- Constituency: Akershus

Personal details
- Born: 26 August 1971 (age 54) Nes, Akershus, Norway
- Party: Labour

Sverre Myrli (born 26 August 1971 in Nes) is a Norwegian politician for the Labour Party.

== Political career ==
=== Jagland cabinet ===
During the cabinet Jagland he was appointed political advisor in the Ministry of Transport.

=== Parliament ===
He was elected to the Norwegian Parliament from Akershus in 1997, served in the position of deputy representative during the term 2001–2005 and was elected for a second time in 2005. During the period as a deputy he completed a bachelor's degree at the Oslo University College.

On 20 February 2007, the Storting voted to abolish the bicameral chambers, the Lagting and Odelsting, where Myrli was the only one who voted against.

Following the 2021 election, Myrli was selected as the fourth Vice President of the Storting. His tenure was cut short after nearly a month, after he was dismissed by the party to retain his post after Masud Gharahkhani was nominated to succeed Eva Kristin Hansen following her resignation. The reason was said to be that he had an inappropriate relationship with an 18-year-old girl when he was 26. Myrli called it an "invaluable game", and "unnecessary".

=== Local politics ===
Myrli was a member of Nes municipality council from 1991 to 1997 and 2003 to 2007; during the first period he was also a member of Akershus county council.
