= Borghild Tenden =

Norwegian politician

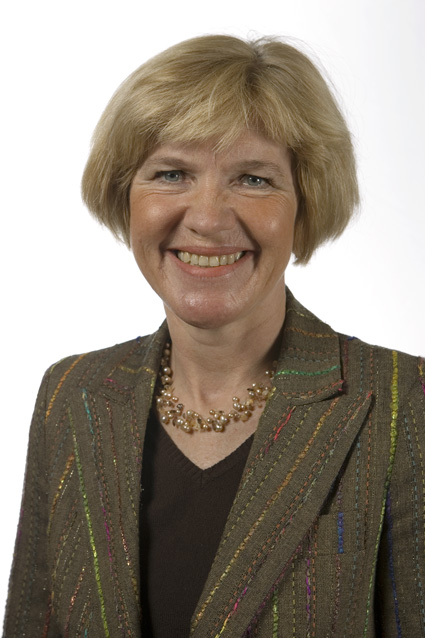
Borghild Tenden (2005)

Borghild Tenden (born 23 June 1951) is a Norwegian politician for the Liberal Party.

She was born in Stryn Municipality. After finishing her secondary education in 1970, she studied for two years at the Norwegian School of Sport Sciences and four years at the University of Oslo. Graduating as a teacher, she worked at Valler Upper Secondary School from 1978 to 1993 and also took further courses in law and sociology. From 1993 to 1996 she held a job as adviser to the Liberal Party parliamentary caucus, and from 1996 to 2005 she worked as an informational adviser in Parliament.

Standing for political election, she served as a deputy representative to the Parliament of Norway from Akershus from 1997 to 2001, and was elected as a full representative in 2005. She served as the first deputy chair the Standing Committee on Transport and Communications.

Although the 2009 parliamentary election ended badly for the Liberal Party, Tenden won a seat in Akershus. She and Trine Skei Grande from Oslo made up the Liberal Party's parliamentary delegation. Incidentally, this was the first time a Norwegian parliamentary caucus consisted only of women.

Ahead of the 2013 election she was offered the second ballot spot behind Abid Raja. She declined, choosing to not fight head-to-head for the first ballot spot, and retired from politics.

Tenden had also been a member of Bærum control committee from 1999 to 2003, deputy member of the municipal council for Bærum Municipality from 1999 to 2007 and a member from 2007 to 2011, as well as a member of Akershus county council from 2003 to 2007. She was deputy leader of Akershus Liberal Party from 1994 to 1996 and leader of Bærum Liberal Party from 1998 to 2001. Outside of politics, she sat on the Oslofjordens Friluftsråd council and sat on the central board of the European Movement Norway.
