= Rolf Reikvam =

Norwegian politician

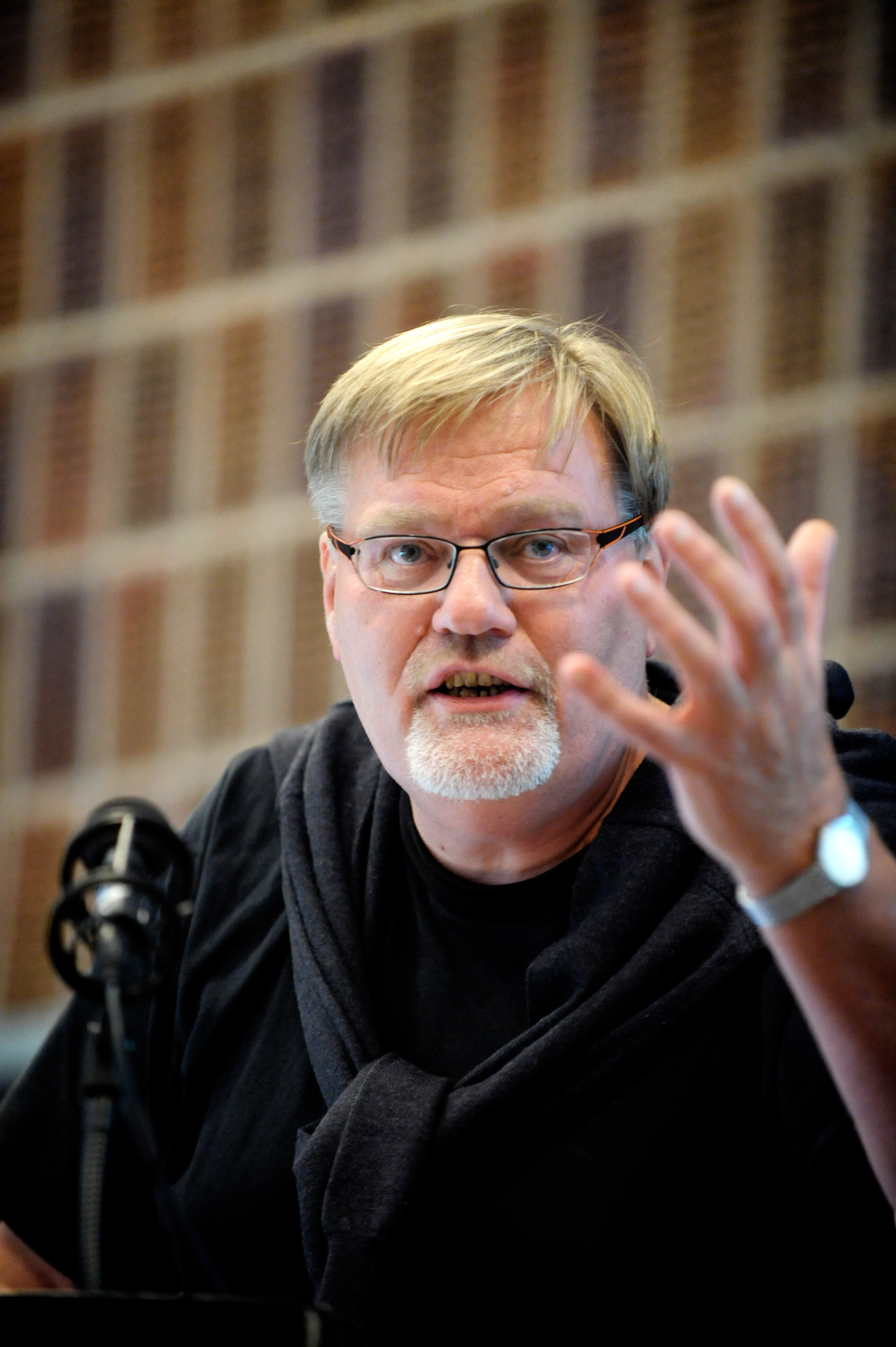
- Born: 12 March 1948 (age 77); Førde, Norway
- Occupation: Politician

Rolf Reikvam (born 12 March 1948 in Førde) is a Norwegian politician for the Socialist Left Party (SV). He was elected to the Norwegian Parliament from Akershus in 1997.

He was a member of the Akershus county council from 1987 to 1997.

== Parliamentary Presidium duties ==
- 2005–2009 secretary of the Lagting.

== Parliamentary Committee duties ==
- 2005–2009 member of the Electoral Committee.
- 2005–2009 member of the Fullmaktskomiteen.
- 2005–2009 member of the Standing Committee on Education, Research and Church Affairs.
- 2001–2005 member of the Fullmaktskomiteen.
- 2001–2005 leader of the Standing Committee on Education, Research and Church Affairs.
- 1997–2001 member of the Standing Committee on Education, Research and Church Affairs.
