= Kari Sofie Bjørnsen =

Norwegian politician (born 1967)

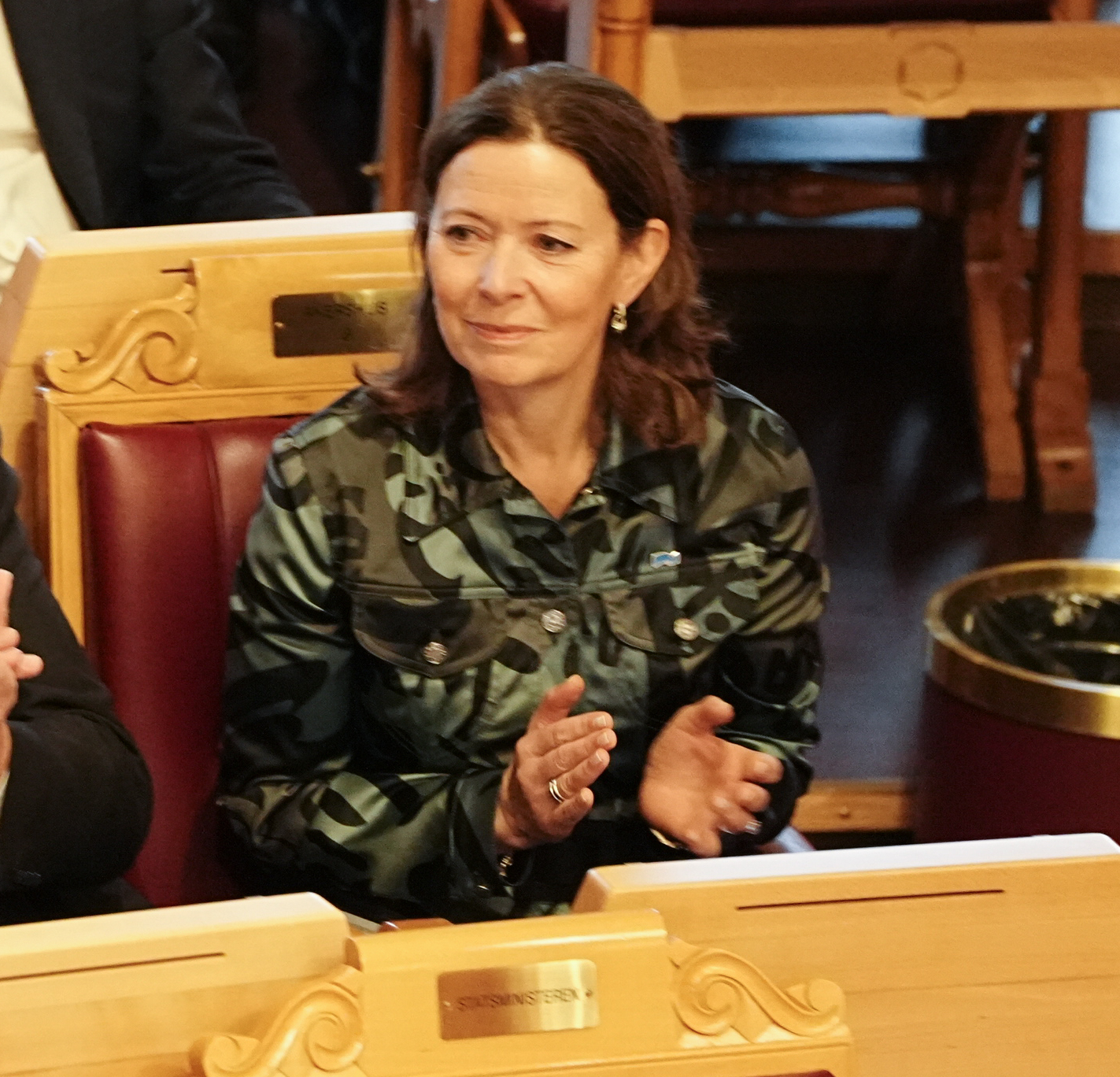
- Kari Sofie Bjørnsen in 2024

Member of the Storting
- Incumbent
- Assumed office 1 October 2025
- Constituency: Akershus

Leader of Akershus Conservative Party
- Incumbent
- Assumed office 23 November 2023
- First Deputy: Per Erling Løkken
- Second Deputy: Tonje Anderson Olsen
- Preceded by: Position established

Personal details
- Born: 11 February 1967 (age 59)
- Party: Conservative

Kari Sofie Bjørnsen (born 11 February 1967) is a Norwegian politician from the Conservative Party (H). She was elected to the Storting in the 2025 Norwegian parliamentary election and has since 2023 been the leader of the Akershus Conservative Party.

Bjørnsen is a board member of the Sahara Forest Project Foundation. She is a lawyer by profession.
