= Nicholas Wilkinson =

Norwegian politician

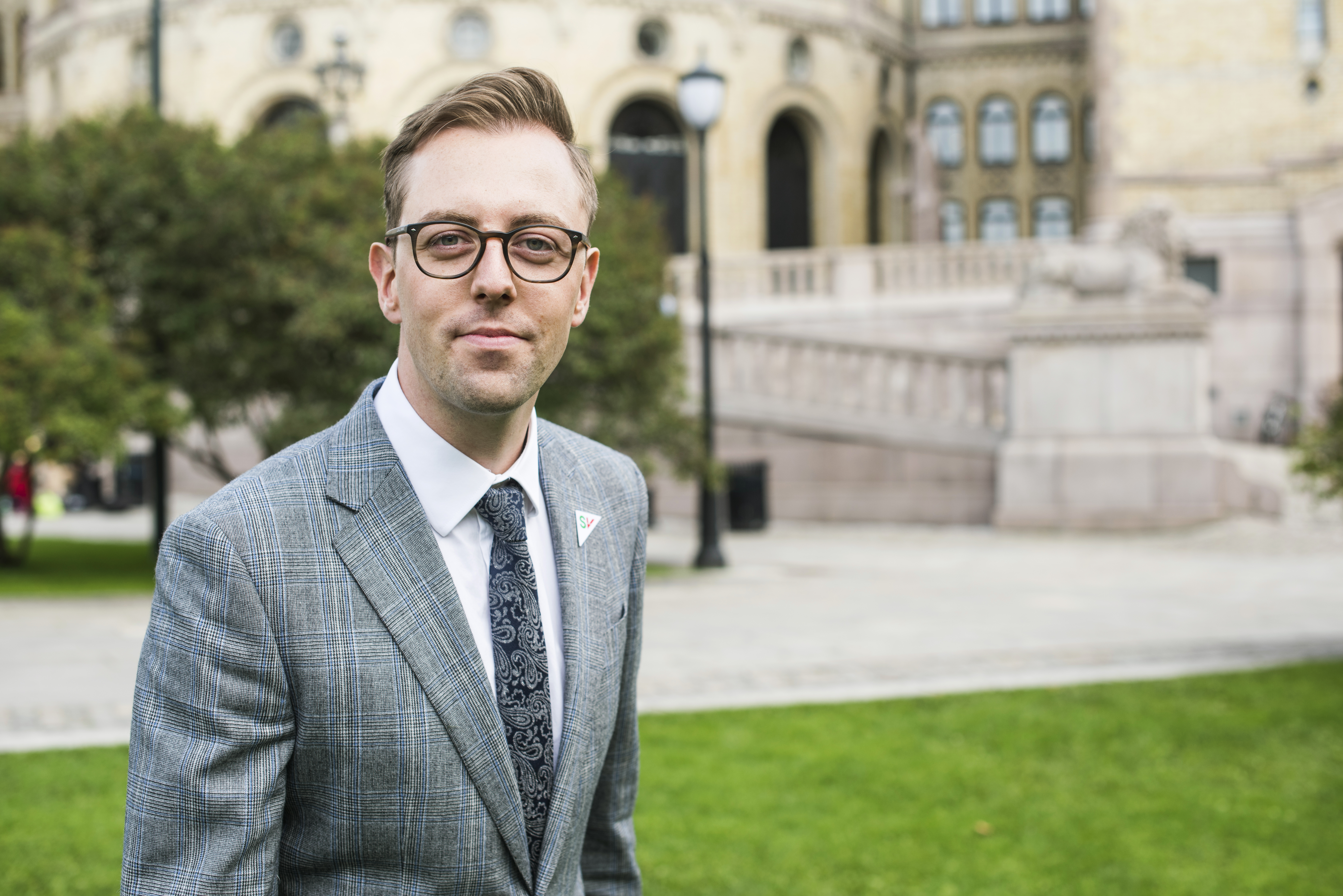
- Wilkinson in 2017

Member of the Storting
- In office 1 October 2017 – 30 September 2021
- Constituency: Akershus

Leader of the Socialist Youth
- In office 23 June 2014 – 26 June 2016
- Preceded by: Andreas Halse
- Succeeded by: Andrea Sjøvoll

Personal details
- Born: 15 March 1988 (age 38) Lillehammer, Oppland, Norway
- Party: Socialist Left
- Spouse: Sebastian Forbes (m. 2019)
- Education: University of Manchester
- Occupation: Politician

Nicholas Wilkinson (born 15 March 1988) is a Norwegian politician from the Socialist Left Party. He served as a representative to the Storting from Akershus from 2017 to 2021.

== Political career ==
Wilkinson served as the leader of the Socialist Youth from 2014 to 2016.

He was elected to the Storting, the Norwegian parliament, following the 2017 election. In Parliament, he was a member of the Standing Committee on Health and Care Services and the Preparatory Credentials Committee; the latter of which he sat in from June to September 2021. In June 2020, Wilkinson announced that he wouldn't be seeking re-election in the 2021 election.

== Personal life ==
Born in 1988, Wilkinson is the son of Simon Wilkinson and Ragnhild Bendiksby, a psychiatrist and former department manager for the Ministry of Children and Families respectfully. He resides in Oppegård and also holds British citizenship. He is openly gay. In January 2019, he married his boyfriend of seven years, Sebastian Forbes.
