= Kjell Engebretsen =

Norwegian politician (born 1941)

Kjell Engebretsen (born 29 April 1941 in Oslo) is a Norwegian politician for the Labour Party.

He was elected to the Norwegian Parliament from Akershus in 1993, and was re-elected on two occasions.

Engebretsen was a member of Frogn municipality council in the periods 1983–1987 and 1991–1993. During these periods he was also a member of Akershus county council.
