= Harald Halvorsen (politician) =

Norwegian politician (1877–1943)

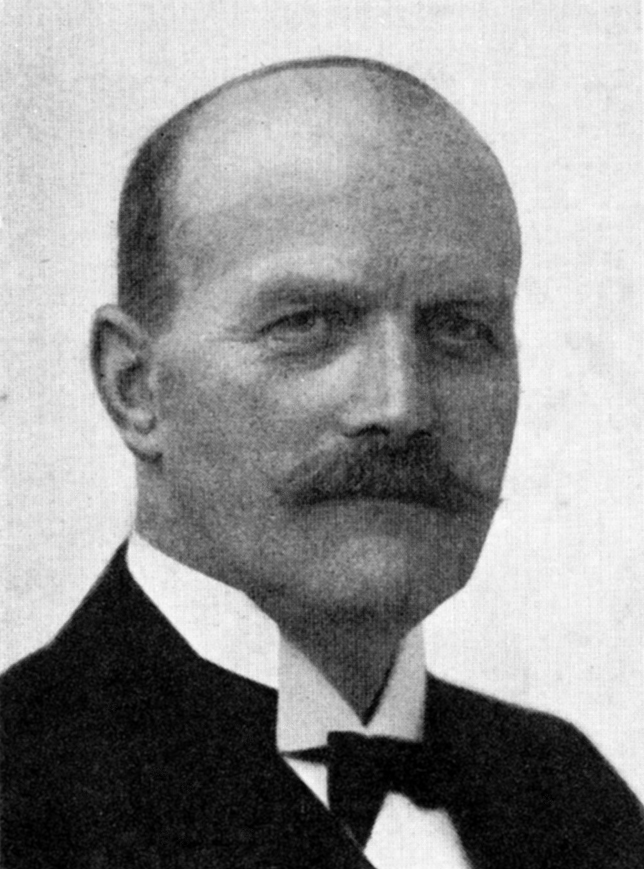
- Born: 13 September 1877; Østre Aker, Norway
- Died: 9 December 1943 (aged 66)
- Occupation: Politician

Harald Halvorsen (13 September 1877 – 9 December 1943) was a Norwegian politician.

He was born in Østre Aker to timberman Halvor Kristiansen and Anne Kristine Olsdatter. He was elected representative to the Storting for six consecutive periods, first 1922–1924 and last time 1937–1945, for the Labour Party.
