= Sonja Ludvigsen =

Norwegian politician

Minister of Social Affairs
- In office 16 October 1973 – 12 July 1974
- Prime Minister: Trygve Bratteli
- Preceded by: Bergfrid Fjose
- Succeeded by: Tor Halvorsen

Member of the Norwegian Parliament
- In office 1 October 1965 – 12 July 1974
- Constituency: Akershus

Deputy Member of the Norwegian Parliament
- In office 1 January 1958 – 30 September 1965
- Constituency: Akershus

Personal details
- Born: Sonja Aase Ludvigsen; 7 February 1928 Vestby, Akershus, Norway
- Died: 12 July 1974 (aged 46) Oslo, Norway
- Party: Labour

Sonja Aase Ludvigsen (7 February 1928 – 12 July 1974) was a Norwegian politician and member of the Labour Party, who served as minister of social affairs under Trygve Bratteli's second government.

== Career ==
Ludvigsen was born in Vestby in 1928. After completing her education she did various white-collar jobs before obtaining employment with Vestby municipality where she was a tax adjuster from 1958 to 1965. She was a member of Vestby municipal council from 1955 to 1959 and from 1963 to 1972, and a member of the school board from 1960 to 1968. She was a member of the Workers' Youth League central board from 1958 to 1964 and the Labour Party central board from 1965 to 1974.

Ludvigsen served as a deputy representative to the Parliament of Norway from Akershus during the terms 1958–1961 and 1961–1965 before being elected in 1965. During her first term she was a member of the Standing Committee on Transport and Communications. She was re-elected in 1969 and again in 1973. She spent her second term as a member of the Standing Committee on Industry from 1969 to 1971, then as chair of the Standing Committee on Social Affairs and member of the Enlarged Committee on Foreign Affairs and Constitutional Affairs from 1971 to 1973. During her third term she did not attend parliamentary sessions at all but served as Minister of Social Affairs in Bratteli's Second Cabinet from October 1973. She died in office, and was replaced in Parliament by Thor-Eirik Gulbrandsen.

Ludvigsen chaired the now-defunct government agency Likestillingsrådet from 1972 to 1973, and from 1973 to 1974 she was a deputy member of the Norwegian Nobel Committee.

Ludvigsen died when only 46 years old having been suffering from a terminal disease, a condition she knew about before taking office as Minister of Social Affairs.

Tor Halvorsen was appointed acting Minister in April, but no successor had been named a month after Ludvigsen's death. In August 1974 the newspaper Verdens Gang wrote that the "only thing which can be said to be certain now, is that the new Minister of Social Affairs will be a woman". This proved to be an inaccurate statement as three weeks later a man, Tor Halvorsen, was named as the permanent Minister of Social Affairs.

Political offices
Preceded by Bergfrid Fjose	Norwegian Minister of Social Affairs; 1973–1974	Succeeded by Tor Halvorsen
