= Morten Høglund =

Norwegian politician

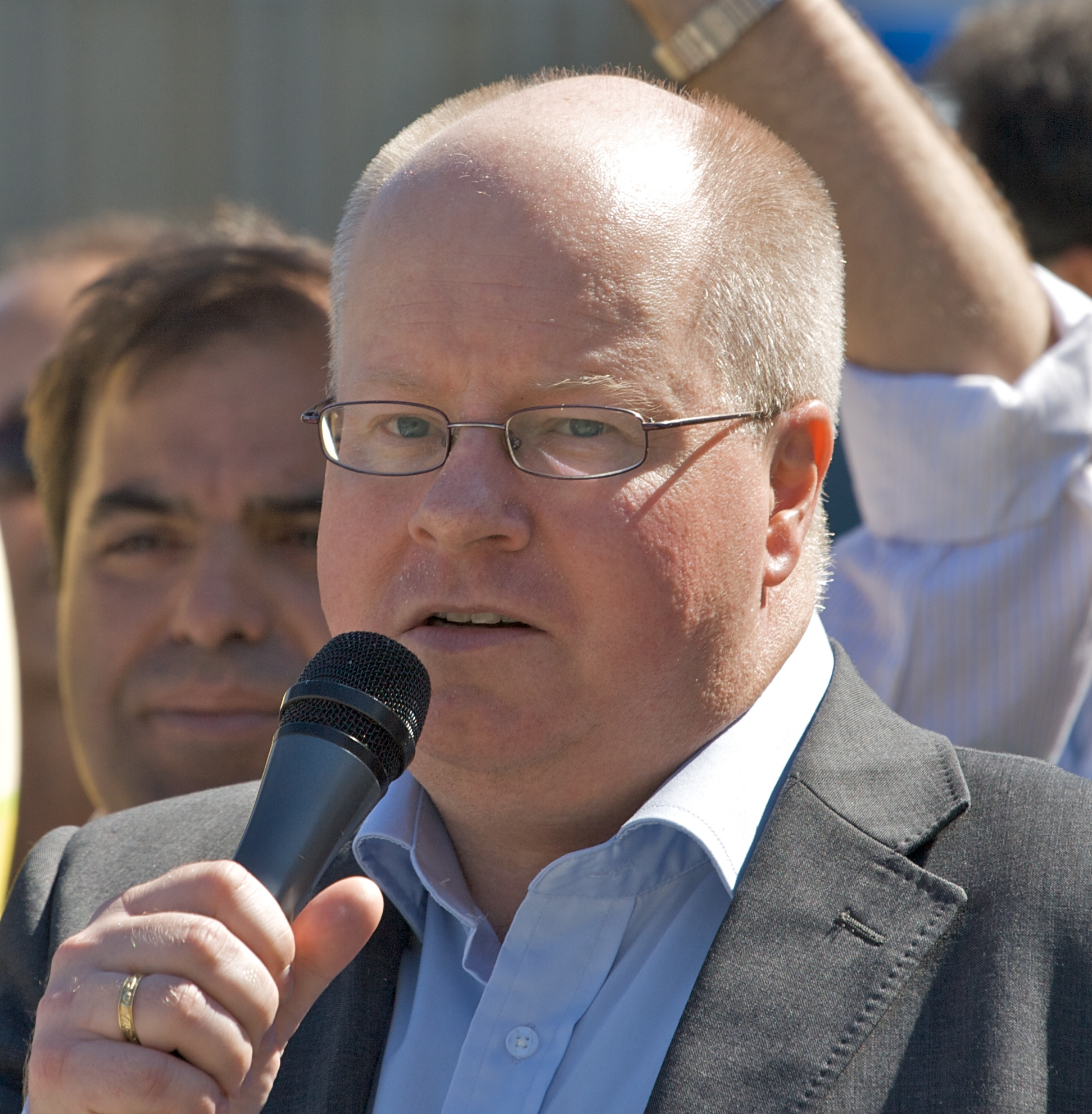
Morten Høglund in 2009

Morten Høglund (born 16 July 1965 in Ski, Norway) is a Norwegian politician representing the Progress Party. He is currently a representative of Akershus in the Storting and was first elected in 2001. Høglund was the vice-mayor of Ski between 1989 and 1991, and then held the same position in Asker from 1995 to 2003.

== Storting committees ==
- 2001–2009 member of the Foreign Affairs committee.
- 2005–2009 reserve member of the Electoral committee.
- 2001–2005 member of the Extended Foreign Affairs committee.
