= Anneliese Dørum =

Norwegian politician (1939–2000)

- Born: 3 October 1939; Trondheim, Norway
- Died: 4 November 2000 (aged 61)
- Occupation: politician
- Years active: 1971–2000
- Known for: Stortinget from Akershus
- Political party: Norwegian Labour Party

Anneliese Dørum (3 October 1939 – 4 November 2000) was a Norwegian politician for the Labour Party.

Dørum was born in Trondheim, Norway.

She was elected to the Norwegian Parliament from Akershus in 1985, and was re-elected on three occasions. She had previously served in the position of deputy representative during the terms 1977–1981 and 1981–1985. During her fourth term in Parliament, she died and was replaced by Rikke Lind.

Dørum was a member of Ullensaker municipality council from 1971 to 1979. From 1975 to 1985 she was a member of Akershus county council.
