= Hartvig Svendsen =

Norwegian politician

Hartvig Svendsen (Aremark, 22 December 1902 – 24 February 1971) was a Norwegian politician for the Labour Party.

== Biography ==
He was elected to the Norwegian Parliament from Akershus in 1945, and was re-elected on four occasions. He had previously served in the position of deputy representative during the years 1937–1945.

Svendsen was involved in local politics in Ski municipality between 1937 and 1963, except for the period between 1940 and 1945, during the German occupation of Norway. He served as mayor during the terms 1945–1947 and 1955–1957.
