= Carl Fredrik Lowzow =

Norwegian politician

Carl Fredrik Lowzow (5 August 1927 in Oslo – October 20, 2009) was a Norwegian politician for the Conservative Party.

He was elected to the Norwegian Parliament from Akershus in 1977, and was re-elected on two occasions.

On the local level he was a member of Skedsmo municipal council from 1967 to 1975. From 1971 to 1975 and 1991 to 1995 he was a member of Akershus county council. He chaired the county party chapter from 1978 to 1984, and was a member of the central party board during the same period.

Outside politics he worked as an engineer and a CEO.
