= Gerd Kirste =

Norwegian politician

Gerd Kirste, née Sørum (10 June 1918 – 9 December 2014) was a Norwegian politician for the Conservative Party.

She was born in Bærum as a daughter of engineer Sigurd Rolf Sørum (1889–1959) and housewife Anna née Hole (1894–1969). She was married to Ernst Kirste, a son of Max Richard Kirste. They had three children and resided at Høvik.

She was elected to the Parliament of Norway from Akershus in 1977, and was re-elected in 1981, serving until 1985. She had previously served as a deputy representative during the terms 1965–1969 and 1969–1973. On the local level she was a member of the executive committee of Bærum municipal council from 1963 to 1971. From 1965 to 1971 she was a member of Akershus county council.
