= Hans Frode Asmyhr =

Norwegian lawyer and politician

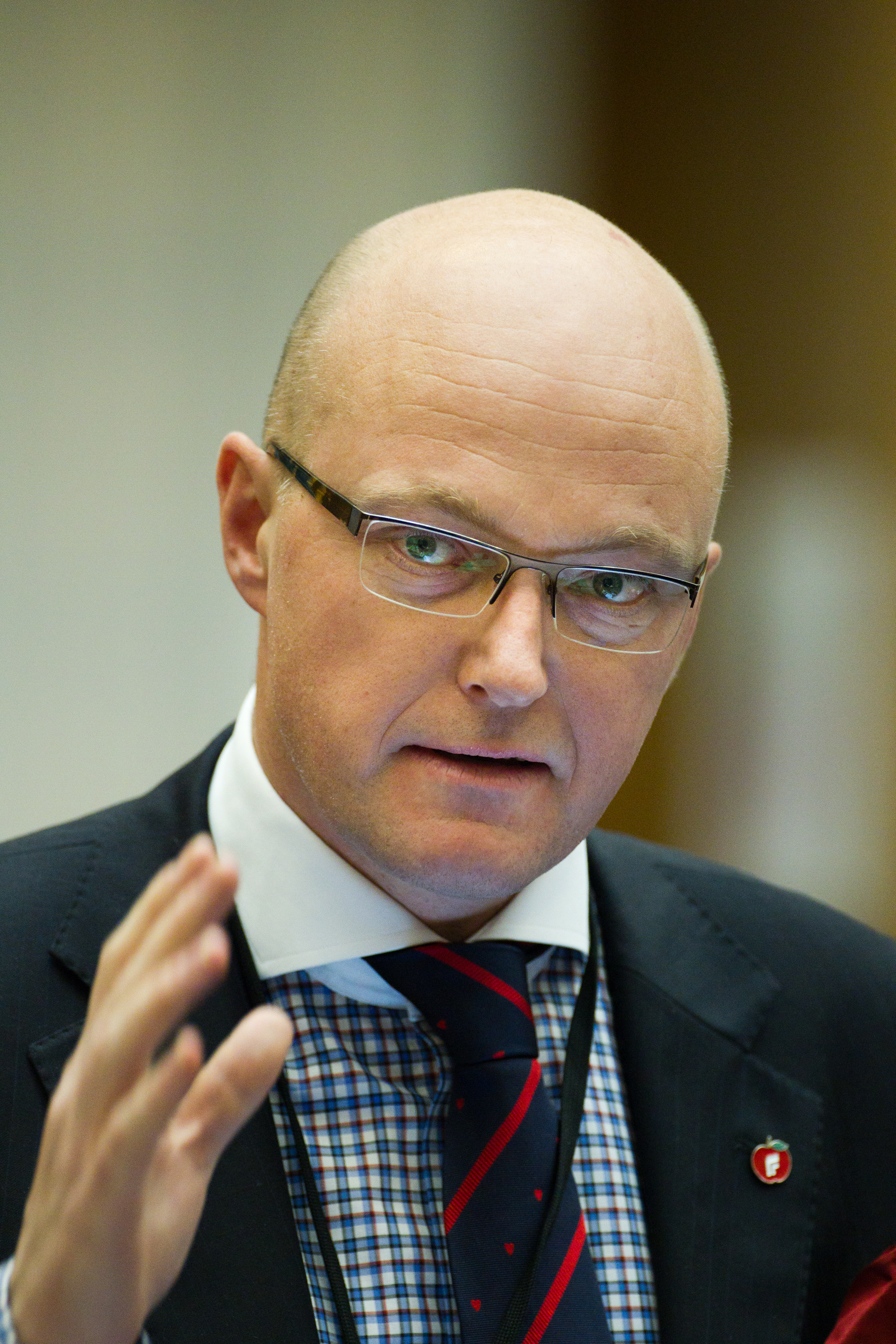
Hans Frode Asmyhr

Hans Frode Kielland Asmyhr (born 26 February 1970 in Lørenskog) is a Norwegian lawyer and politician representing the Progress Party. He is currently a representative of Akershus in the Storting and was first elected in 2005.

== Early life and education ==
Born in Lørenskog, Akershus to CEO Svein Kristian Asmyhr (1946-) and psychiatric nurse Rita Kielland (1948-). Asmyhr grew up in Frogner, Sørum on the family-owned farm. He attended Melvold junior high school from 1983 to 1986, and Lillestrøm senior high school from 1986 to 1990. He spent a one year in 1987-88 as a foreign exchange student at Grayson County High School in Kentucky, United States. He completed his military service with the Hans Majestet Kongens Garde from 1990 to 1991.

In 1991 he enrolled in law school at the University of Oslo earning his law degree in 1998. In 2000, he was a visiting scholar at the George Washington University in Washington, D.C., on a Robert D. Stuart, jr. Fellowship.

== Political career ==
On the local level, Asmhyr was elected to the municipal council for Sørum in 1995, on which he served until 2005. First elected to the Akershus county council in 1995, he served until 2003. He was first elected to the Norwegian parliament, the Storting, for Akershus in 2005, and was reelected in 2009. In the autumn of 2010 he served as the pro tempore Vice-speaker of the Storting for five weeks. During the run-up to the 2013 parliamentary elections, Asmyhr announced that he would not seek reelection.

== Political views ==
=== Law enforcement ===
Outspoken on issues relating to law enforcement and the judiciary, Asmyhr often acts as party spokesperson on these matters. In response to the annual increase in numbers of aggravated sexual assaults in the capital Oslo in 2011, Asmyhr called for the establishment of women-only taxi companies.

In the wake of case against the notorious child molester known as The Pocket Man, Asmyhr called for the implementation of Chemical sterilisation of convicted child molesters, warning against playing "Russian roulette with children's lives". In the aftermath of the 2011 Norway attacks, he proposed a parliamentary ad hoc committee be set up to examine, assess and scrutinize the Norwegian Police Security Service efforts before, during and after the attacks.

=== European integration ===
A lifelong proponent of Norwegian membership in into the European Union and European integration, Asmhyr was appointed to the central committee in the Norwegian branch of the European Movement International in 2011. He led a group of dissenter when the Progress Party voted no to the EU Data Retention Directive in parliament. After much debate, the measure was passed in the end, due to support from the Conservative Party as well as the Labour Party.

== Storting committees ==
- 2005–2009 member of the Election Committee
- 2005–2009 member of the Standing Committee on Business and Industry
- 2009–2013 member of the Standing Committee on Justice
