= Arne Torolf Strøm =

Norwegian politician

Arne Torolf Strøm (1 October 1901 – 2 April 1972) was a Norwegian politician for the Labour Party.

He was born in Oslo.

He was elected to the Norwegian Parliament from Akershus in 1945, and was re-elected on three occasions.
