= Thor Fossum =

Norwegian politician

Thor Fossum (29 June 1916 – 21 August 1993) was a Norwegian politician for the Labour Party.

He was born in Bærum.

He was elected to the Norwegian Parliament from Akershus in 1961, and was re-elected on one occasion. He had previously served in the position of deputy representative in the period 1958–1961, but during this whole period he met as a regular representative since Halvard Manthey Lange had been appointed to the Cabinet.
