= Ursula Evje =

Norwegian politician (born 1944)

Member of Parliament for Akershus
- In office 1 October 1997 – 30 September 2005

Personal details
- Born: December 13, 1944 (age 81) Oslo, Norway
- Party: Progress Party (until 2004); Independent (2004–2005)

Ursula Evje (born 13 December 1944 in Oslo) is a Norwegian politician for the Progress Party.

She was elected to the Norwegian Parliament from Akershus in 1997, and was re-elected on two occasions. However, in December 2004, during her third term, she left the party, continuing as an independent representative. She did not seek re-election for a new party in 2005.

Evje was a member of the executive committee of Skedsmo municipality council from 1995 to 1998.
