= Sonja Irene Sjøli =

Norwegian politician

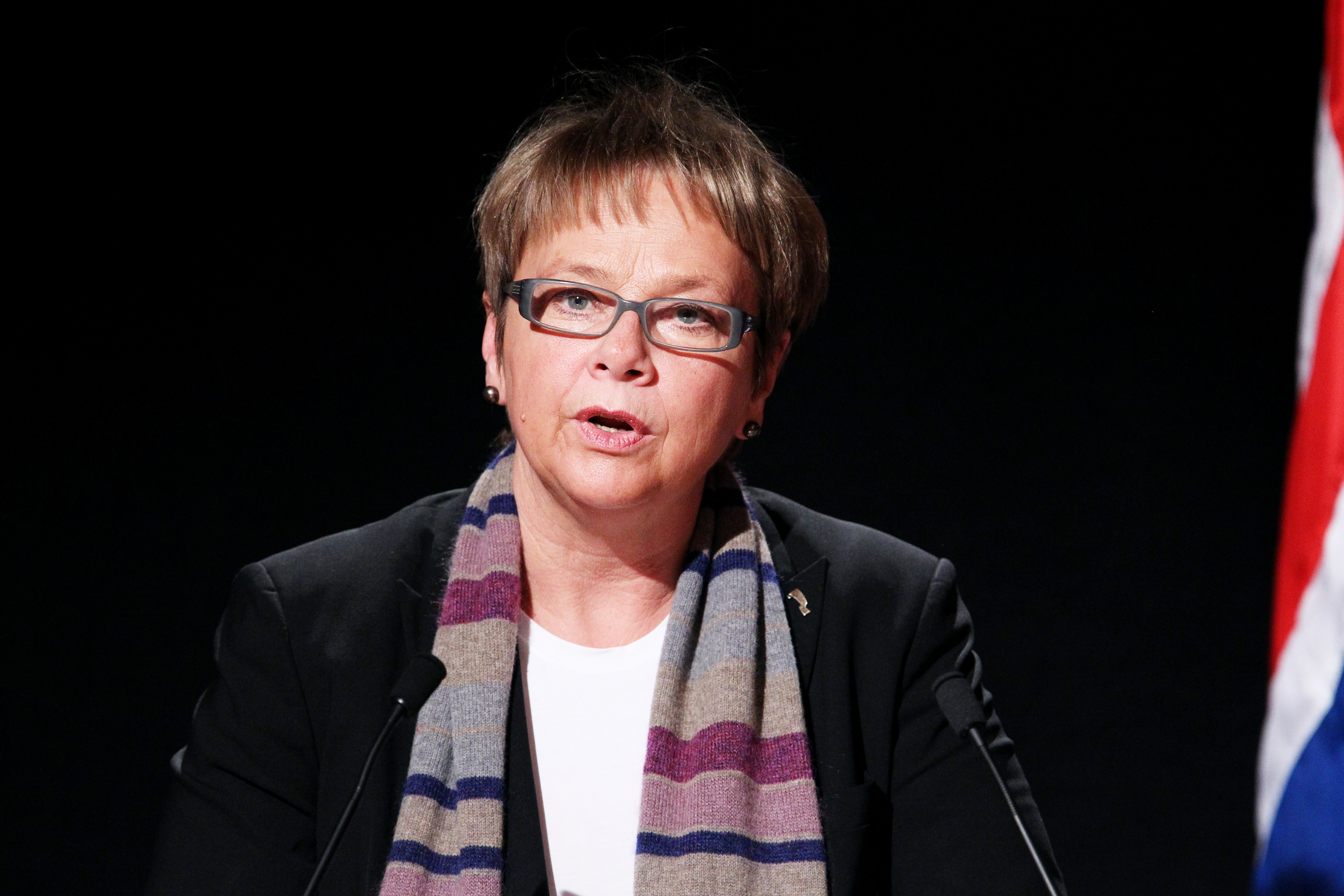
Sonja I. Sjøli

Sonja Irene Sjøli (born 6 June 1949 in Hamar) is a Norwegian politician representing the Conservative Party. She is currently a representative of Akershus in the Storting and was first elected in 1997.

== Parliamentary committee duties ==
- 2005–2009 member of the Healthcare committee.
- 2005–2009 member of the Electoral committee.
- 2005–2009 second vice-leader of the Accreditation committee.
- 2001–2005 leader of the Family, Culture and Administration committee.
- 2001–2005 member of the Accreditation committee.
- 2001–2005 reserve member of the Extended Foreign Affairs committee.
- 2001–2005 reserve member of the Electoral committee.
- 1997–2001 member of the Welfare committee.
- 2001–2005 vice-secretary of the Storting.
