= Liv Tomter =

Norwegian politician

Liv Tomter (27 August 1901 – 13 November 1978) was a Norwegian politician for the Labour Party.

Born in Nittedal, she was elected to the Norwegian Parliament from Akershus in 1950, and was re-elected on three occasions. She had previously served in the position of deputy representative in the period 1945–1949, but during this whole period she met as a regular representative since Trygve Lie had been appointed to the Cabinet (1945–1946) and later became the Secretary-General of the United Nations (from 1946).
