= Kristian Asdahl =

Norwegian politician (1920–2000)

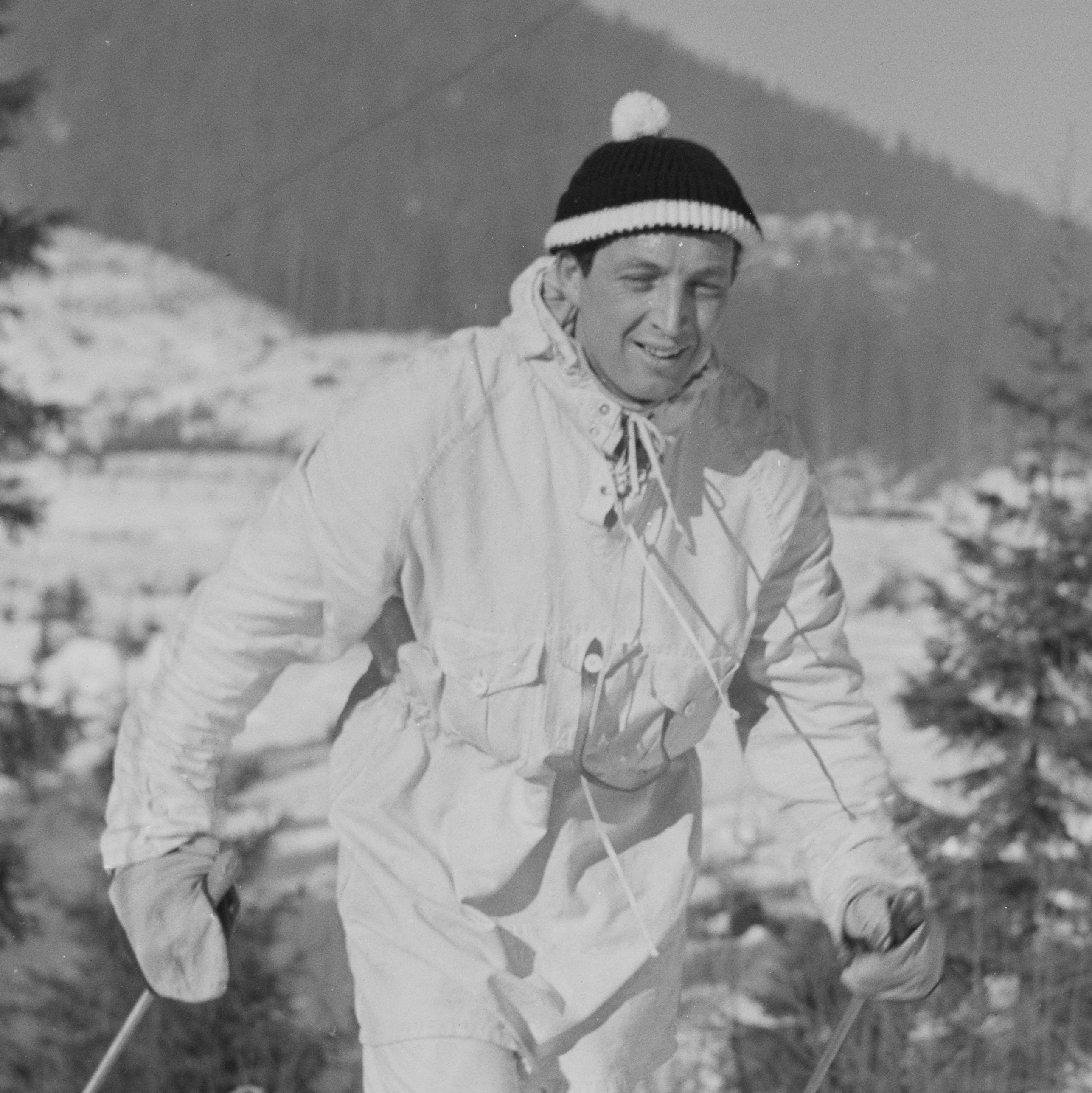

Kristian Asdahl (8 April 1920 – 21 January 2000) was a Norwegian politician for the Conservative Party.

He was born in Nes.

He was elected to the Norwegian Parliament from Akershus in 1954, and was re-elected on two occasions.

He spent his professional career as a business leader and CEO in Årnes, Jørpeland and Oslo, and later settled in Bærum. He had no less than 77 positions in boards of companies and non-governmental organizations.
