= Erland Asdahl =

Norwegian politician (1921–1988)

Erland Asdahl (6 April 1921, Nes – 19 July 1988) was a Norwegian politician for the Centre Party.

He was elected to the Norwegian Parliament from Akershus in 1977, but was not re-elected in 1981. He had previously served as a deputy representative during the terms 1954–1957, 1958–1961, 1965–1969 and 1969–1973.

On the local level he was a member of the executive committee of Nes municipal council during the terms 1959–1963 and 1971–1975. From 1959 to 1967 and 1971 to 1975 he was also a member of Akershus county council. He was a member of the national party board from 1952 to 1956, and chaired the local party chapter from 1956 to 1957.

A dedicated Lutheran, he chaired the Diocese Council of Borg from 1970 to 1974.
