= André Oktay Dahl =

Norwegian politician

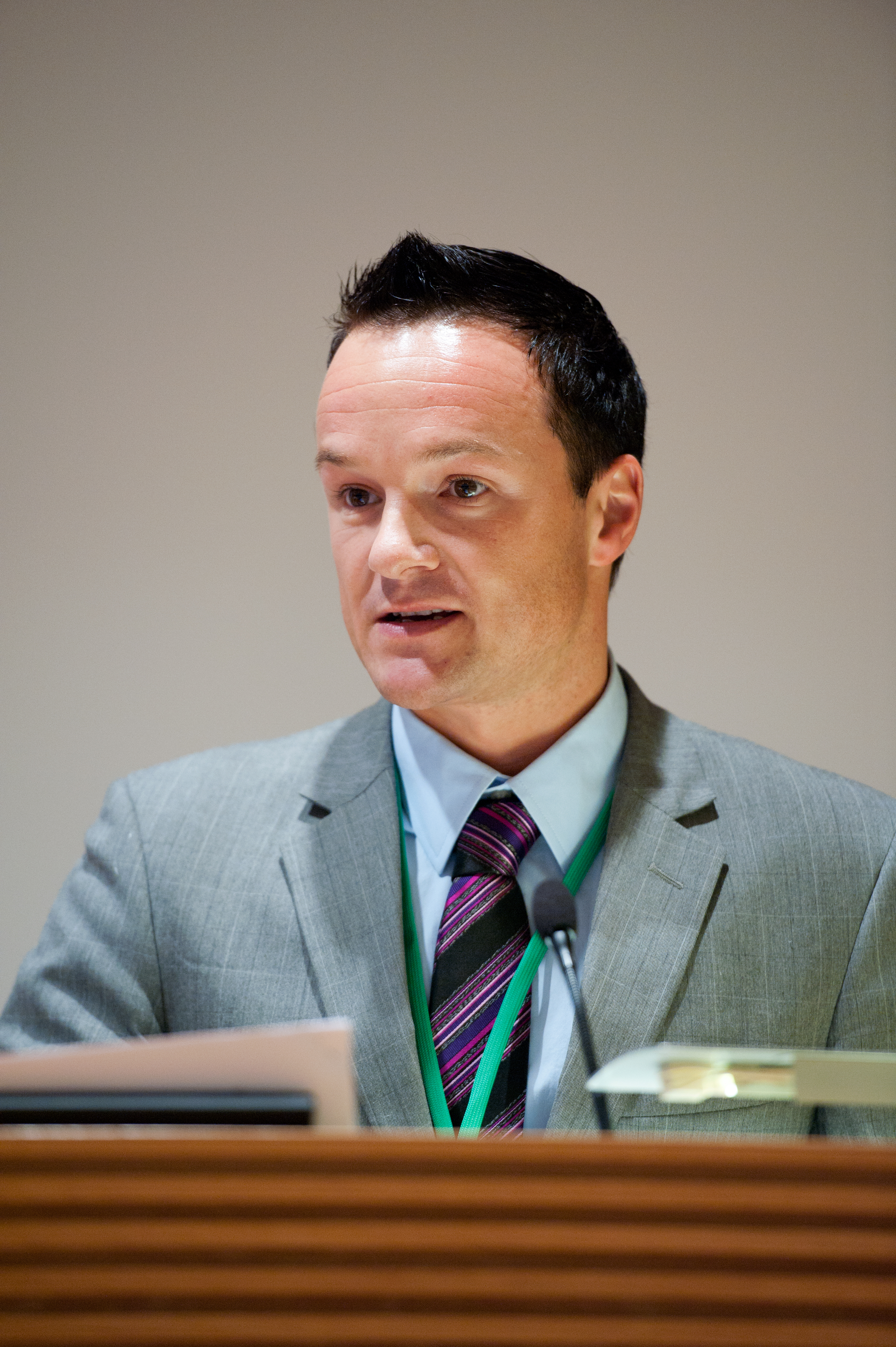

Member of the Norwegian Parliament for Akershus
- In office 2005–2013

Personal details
- Party: Conservative Party

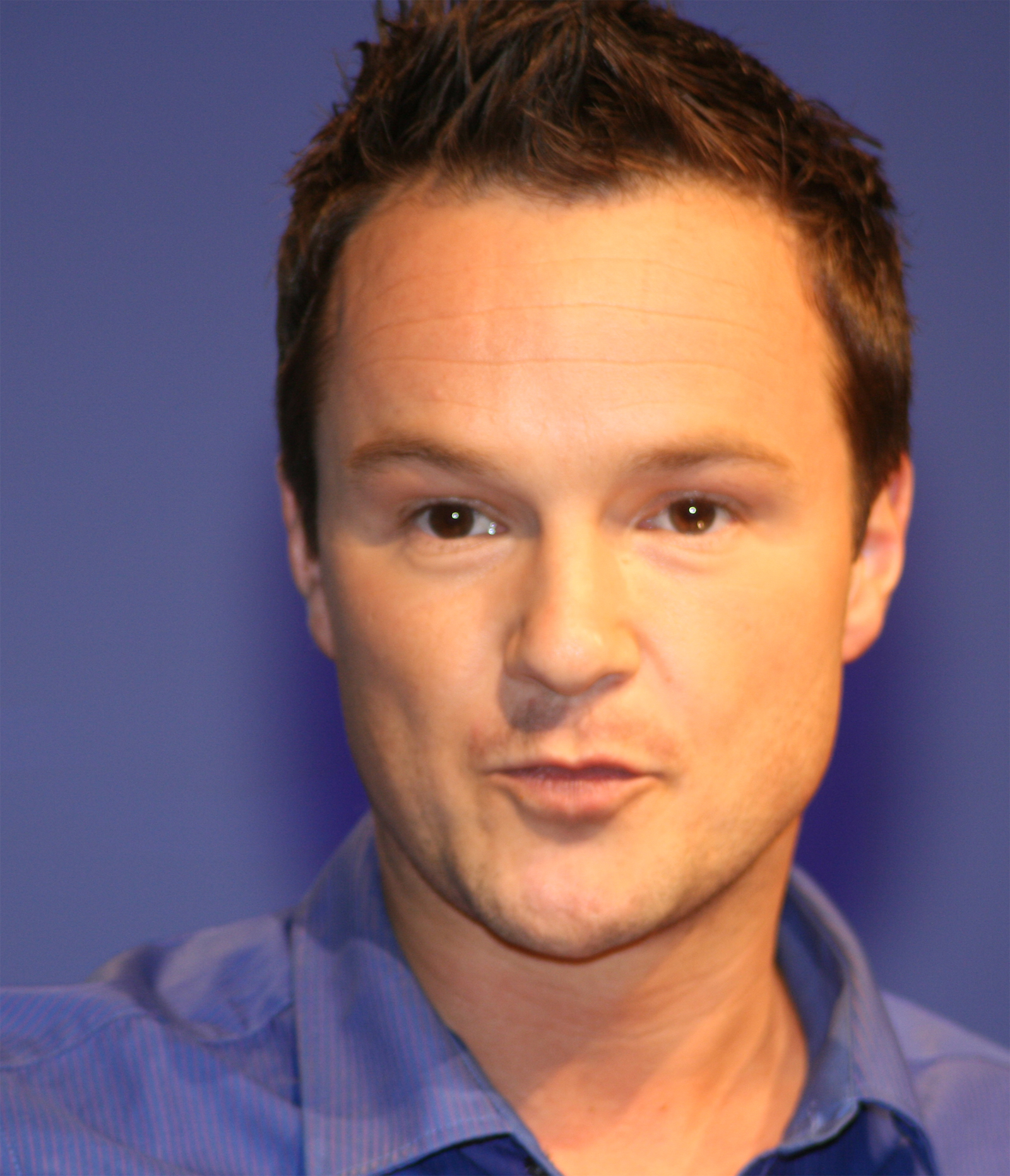
Dahl in 2009

André Oktay Dahl (born 7 July 1975, in Lørenskog) is a Norwegian law graduate who was a politician representing the Conservative Party. He served as a representative of Akershus in the Storting and was first elected in 2005. He was a reserve candidate in the two previous periods, and took Jan Petersen's seat while Petersen was a cabinet minister from 2001 to 2005.

He was elected to the regional Parliament of Akershus between 1999 and 2006, where he amongst others led the standing Committee on Scrutiny. Dahl has also led the Akershus Conservatives, his party's biggest regional party, between 2008 and 2012. During his time in parliament he focused on fighting homophobia, fighting for female rights, anti-corruption and fighting against child abuse. In January 2008 he made accusations that were considered harsh against controversial Norwegian defense attorney Tor Erling Staff who was then defense attorney for the suspected Pocket Man, a Norwegian pedophile predator. Attorney Staff had asserted that the bulk of the cases with which his client was charged amount to mere "peanuts". Dahl's position was that by downplaying the severity of the abuse, Staff in fact victimized the victims again. Dahl is a former victim of child sexual abuse, and he is also openly gay.

He was rewarded for both his work for gay rights as well as his openness about his own experiences of child sexual abuse. He was member of the board of several organizations working against homophobia and violence towards men as well as women.

Dahl served as his party's central spokesperson in judicial matters and was central in the discussions after the terrorist attacks in Norway after the 22 of July in 2011. Occasionally he tried to get his party to discuss whether Norwegian anti-drug policy "worked" and if criminalization works. He is now a member of the think tank Foenix which works to get better help for people addicted to drugs.

After leaving the Norwegian Parliament, Dahl took the position as account director in public relations consultancy Gambit Hill + Knowlton. He is still partly active in public debates, especially considering the core issues he engaged in when being an elected MP; child abuse, human rights and LGBT- issues.

In 2015 he withdrew his membership of the Conservative Party to become politically independent.

In an interview given to the weekend magazine Dagbladet Magasinet in March 2015 he stated the reason he left politics was that he wasn't sure any more about central political solutions by any political party and did not want to engage any more in party politics. He said he had been approached by several different parties, but wants to stay independent until he knows more about where he stands politically. He also stated that there were "no personal conflicts or dissatisfaction of not being given a position within the new Government" that made him withdraw. If he wanted a position he would "have asked for renomination", he added in the same interview.

Dahl is a skilful clarinet player, and planned to be a professional musician. He was a solo clarinet player in his Majesty's Kings Guards band when he served in the Norwegian Army.

== Storting committees ==
- 2009–2013 deputy leader of the standing Committee of Justice
- 2005–2009 member of the standing Committee of Justice
- 2001–2005 member of the standing Committee of Scrutiny and Constitutional affairs
