= Olav Gunnar Ballo =

Norwegian politician (born 1956)

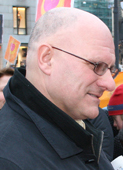
Olav Gunnar Ballo

Olav Gunnar Ballo (born 22 October 1956) is a Norwegian former politician for the Socialist Left Party (SV). Ballo changed party to Arbeiderpartiet in 2011. Ballo was elected to the Norwegian Parliament from Finnmark in 1997. He studied medicine at University of Würzburg, and has worked as a medical doctor. Ballo represented SV in Alta municipality council from 1991 to 1997. Ballo was the leader of the National Forensics Institute ("Rettsmedisinsk institutt") in Norway between 2009 and 2010/2011.

Ballo lost his daughter Kaja Bordevich Ballo in 2008. She committed suicide on 28 March 2008. This happened some hours after she had taken a Scientology personality test. The news made the front page of Norway's biggest newspapers, such as Verdens Gang and Dagbladet. Ballo divorced his first wife of 15 years in 1998. In 1999 he met, and later married, Heidi Sørensen, a politician for the Socialist Left.

== Parliamentary Presidium duties ==
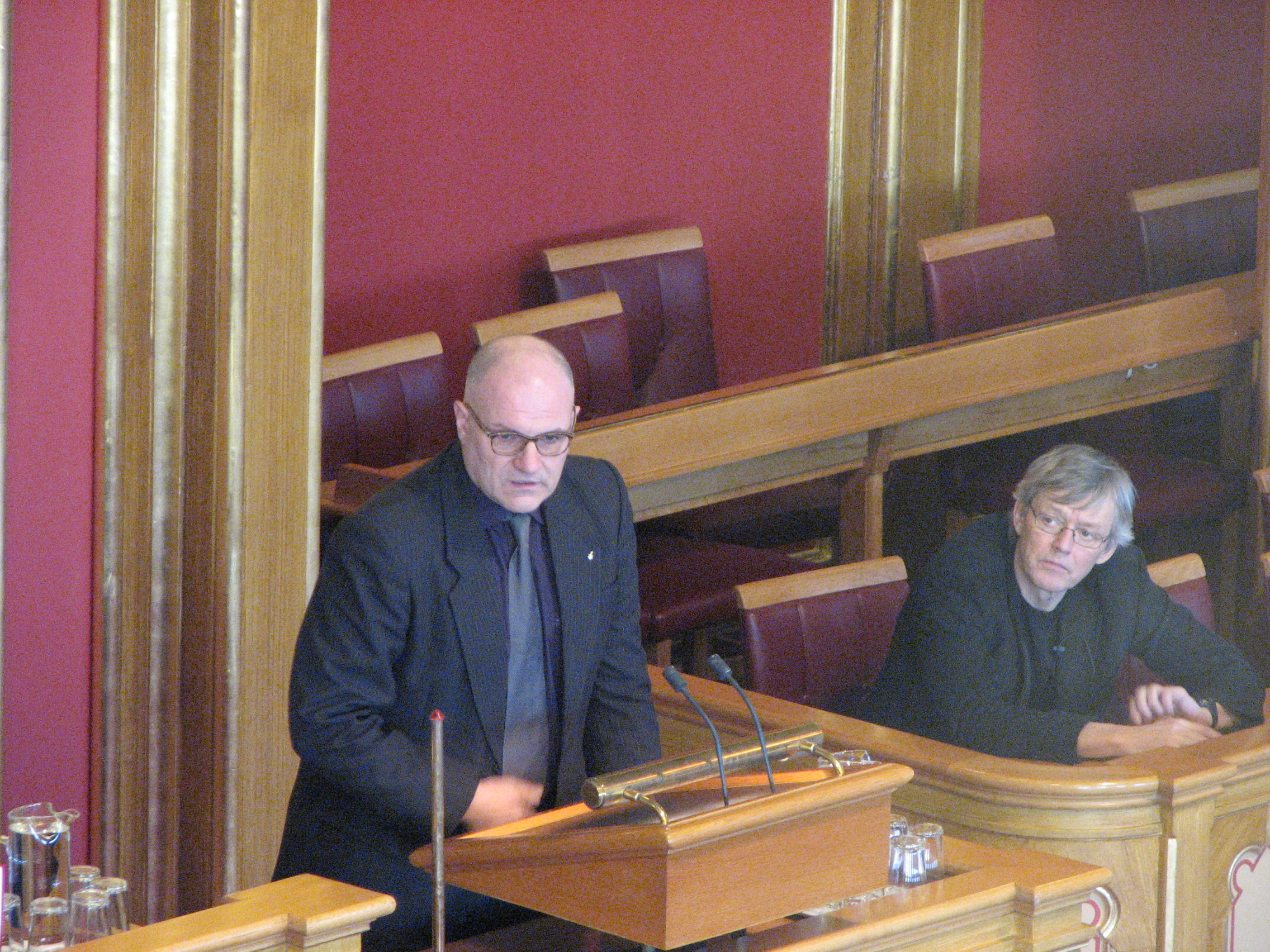
Olav Gunnar Ballo in February 2009, speaking in the Parliament of Norway.

- 2005 – 2009 Vice President of the Odelsting.
- 1997 – 2001 Vice Secretary of the Odelsting.

== Parliamentary Committee duties ==
- 2005 – 2009 member of the Standing Committee on Justice.
- 2001 – 2005 member of the Standing Committee on Labour and Social Affairs.
- 1997 – 2001 member of the Standing Committee on Labour and Social Affairs.

== Works ==
Books

- Ballo, Olav Gunnar (2009). Kaja: 1988-2008 (in Norwegian). Norway: Cappelen Damm. ISBN 978-82-02-28932-4.
