= Suicide of Kaja Ballo =

Norwegian student

- Kaja Ballo
- Date: March 28, 2008
- Location: Nice, France

Kaja Bordevich Ballo (1988 – March 28, 2008) was a Norwegian university student who took her own life in Nice, France, on March 28, 2008, shortly after taking an Oxford Capacity Analysis (OCA), a personality test administered by the Church of Scientology, earlier the same day. Family and friends state that Ballo was happy prior to taking the OCA, and that her mood dramatically shifted after receiving the results; she jumped from the fourth floor of her dorm room hours later. In addition to a suicide note, Ballo's family found the OCA among her belongings. French police investigated connections between Scientology and Ballo's death, and interviewed two leaders of the Church of Scientology in France; prosecutors stated in December 2008 that they were unable to establish a causative link.

A Scientology representative in France asserted that the OCA was not created by the Church, and that it was not related to the suicide. Scientology's information chief in Norway, Matthias Fosse, stated that the OCA was not dangerous and that the organization did not bear any responsibility for the tragedy. Ballo's father, Norwegian MP Olav Gunnar Ballo (SV), retained a lawyer to investigate his daughter's death, and her family considered filing a lawsuit against Scientology. Five hundred people attended Ballo's funeral on April 11, 2008, at Grefsen Church in Oslo.

The incident received significant media coverage in Norway, for which some outlets faced criticism. Norwegian MP Inga Marte Thorkildsen (SV) indicated that she thought Scientology had a role in Ballo's suicide. Psychologist Rudy Myrvang told Aftenposten that the OCA was designed to break down an individual; he characterized the test as a form of recruitment tool for the organization. Scientology critic Andreas Heldal-Lund stated parents of those involved in Scientology contacted him with similar concerns. The Norwegian Psychological Association warned individuals against taking such types of personality tests.

Ballo's father wrote a book about his daughter's death, and refrained from press interviews until the book was published in 2009. Titled Kaja: 1988–2008, the book became a bestseller in Norway. The author stated he wrote the book as an expository method to both process his grief, inform his family about the controversy, and educate the public about suicide.

== Family ==
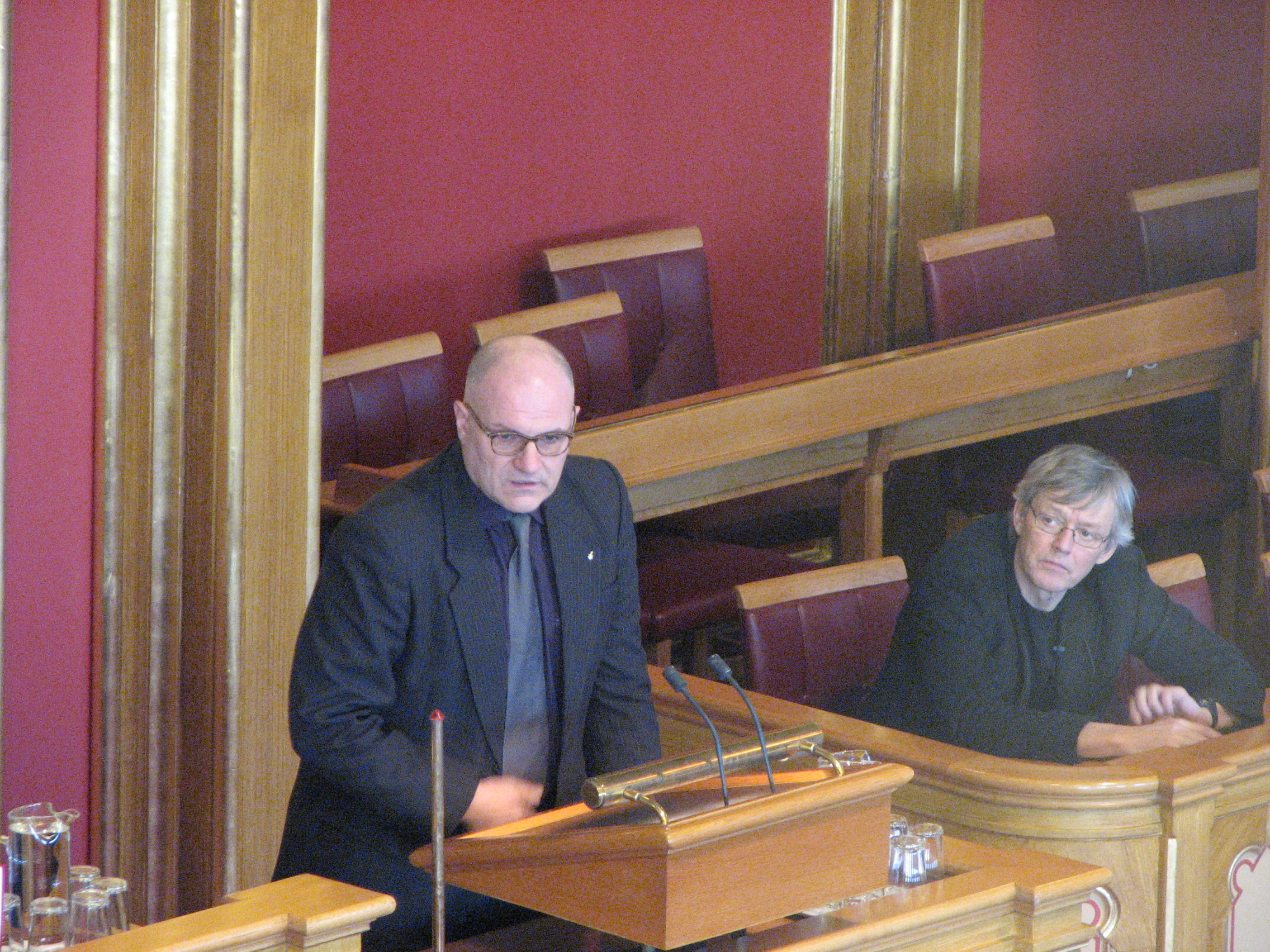
Kaja Bordevich Ballo was the daughter of Olav Gunnar Ballo, a member of the Norwegian Parliament. He wrote a book about her, titled, Kaja 1988–2008.

Kaja Bordevich Ballo was the daughter of Olav Gunnar Ballo, a member of the Norwegian parliament who at the time of her death belonged to the Socialist Left Party (SV). Her stepmother was Heidi Sørensen, a former Norwegian MP for the SV and State Secretary in the Ministry of the Environment.

== Scientology personality test ==
On March 28, 2008, Ballo took a Church of Scientology personality test, officially known as the Oxford Capacity Analysis (OCA), at a storefront Scientology mission located a few meters from her dormitory in Nice, France. According to representatives for Scientology, Ballo spent a total of one hour at the facility. She received a negative result from the OCA, which indicated that some of her responses were situated on what is referred to in Scientology as "an unacceptable level". Out of the 200 questions on the OCA, Ballo missed 100 points, which was seen as "unstable". The OCA stated Ballo had a "very limited" IQ.

Friends and family members maintain that Ballo had not indicated any problems prior to taking the OCA, but her mood "changed" after receiving the results. Ballo's uncle, Heljar Ballo, told public broadcaster NRK that the results of the OCA were "devastating" to her. He described Ballo as "happy and bubbly", stating, "We can only relate the facts, that she was doing well in France, was happy and had many good friends, and that she took this test."

== Death ==
Ballo jumped to her death from the fourth floor of her dorm room two hours after getting the results of the OCA. She left behind a suicide note, along with the OCA results, which was found by her family. In April 2008, Aftenposten noted that the French police were investigating connections between Scientology and Ballo's suicide. The investigation was headed by a French judge, and involved prosecutors. In April 2008, French police interviewed two leaders of the Church of Scientology in France. One French prosecutor told Dagbladet that, "We are almost convinced that it is a suicide. But the question is whether something encouraged her to this." Prosecutors stated in December 2008 that they could not determine a direct link between the Scientology test and Ballo's death.

Agnes Bron, a Scientology representative in France, denied that the OCA was related to Ballo's death, and asserted that the test was not created by the Church of Scientology. Scientologists pay royalties to the Hubbard Foundation for use of the OCA. Bron claimed that Ballo never actually received her test results.

Scientology spokespeople asserted that the OCA non-judgmentally allows an individual to gain insight into their own personality, described the concerns arising from the controversy as "deeply unfair", and noted that Ballo had an eating disorder as a teenager. Scientology's Information Chief in Norway, Matthias Fosse, asserted that the OCA was not "dangerous", and stated that "millions" of individuals had partaken in the test. He asserted that approximately 10,000 residents of Norway had taken the OCA. "I have never, never, never heard of someone who has killed on the basis of the OCA test," said Fosse. Fosse said that Ballo had entered the Scientology premises in Nice of her own volition. He maintained that the negative views of Scientology were based on ignorance and intolerance. "I feel deeply for the Ballo family, but it is a rude insinuation that the Church of Scientology has any responsibility for this incident," said Fosse.

Ballo's father Olav was critical of the statements made by Fosse about his daughter's psychological history. He commented to Verdens Gang (VG) that Scientology was impugning her reputation and not respecting her privacy. Olav did not wish to comment regarding the nature of the investigation in France. Ballo's uncle Heljar explained that her family decided to come forward with information to the media about her suicide, due to a motivation to publicize information relating to the circumstances of her death. Heljar told Aftenposten that the family "had confidence" in the investigation by local law enforcement in France. He publicly expressed his belief that there was a connection between her death and Scientology. Olav retained an attorney to investigate his daughter's death. In April 2008, her family was considering taking legal action against Scientology. Ballo was interred on April 11, 2008, at Grefsen Church in Oslo, and approximately 500 people were present at the funeral ceremony.

== Commentary ==
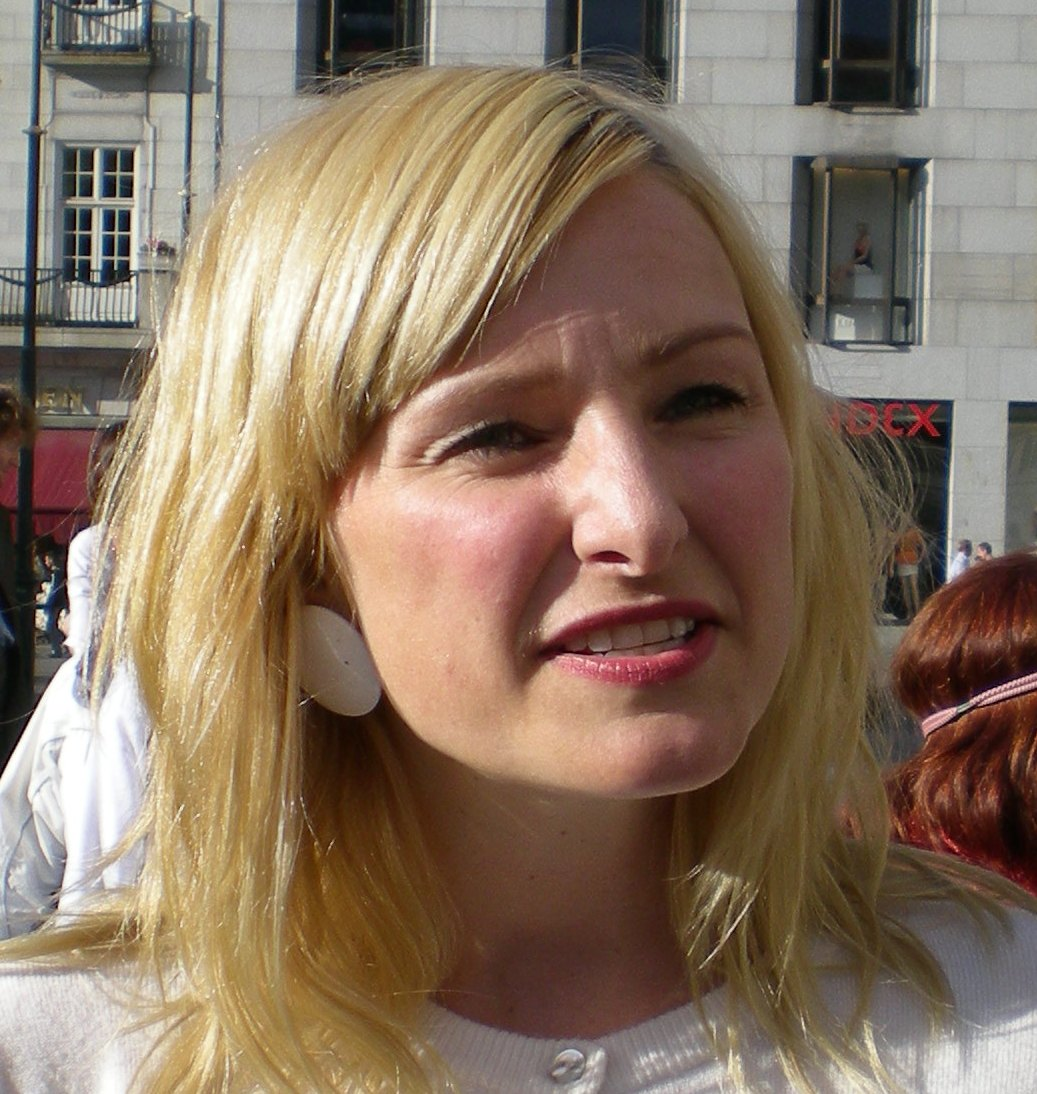
Norway parliament member Inga Marte Thorkildsen (2008)

The Ballo case received a significant amount of coverage in Norwegian news publications; and media attention focused criticism on Scientology. Both VG and Dagbladet devoted several cover stories investigating Ballo's death. However, the media received criticism regarding the amount of coverage given to the case, which a representative of a Norwegian suicide support group regarded as excessive. Peter Raaum, news editor of Dagbladet, defended his paper's coverage: "We write about this because the survivor has made criticism of the Scientology test that Kaja took just before she took her life. The family wanted a debate about this. What makes this so important is this test. What kind of test is this? Is it so reprehensible, and significant to what happened? If it is, I mean it's something that's extremely important to focus on." Ballo's family agreed to discuss the incident with the media. Olav Ballo stated he did not have issues with how newspapers were covering his daughter's death.

Norwegian MP Inga Marte Thorkildsen (SV) told Dagbladet that, "All indications are that the Scientologist sect has played a direct role in Kaja's choice to take her own life." Ballo's friend and study partner, Henry Møinichen, told Dagbladet, "I think Kaja would be alive today if she had not gone to the Scientologists." Psychologist Rudy Myrvang told Aftenposten that testing procedures such as the OCA could have negative consequences; he said the goal was focused on "breaking you down, and then they'll offer to build you up again". Myrvang characterized the OCA as a recruitment tool for Scientology. Dagbladet consulted an expert on the subject of assessment tests, Ole I. Iversen, who characterized the OCA as "unethical and junk".

Scientology critic Andreas Heldal-Lund stated that Scientology views candidates for the OCA as "raw meat from the street". He stated that, "thousands of desperate parents contact me because they have children who have had major mental problems, or taken their own life after similar circumstances to Kaja Ballo". Musician Hank Von Helvete, a Scientologist, commented that he thought psychiatry, not Scientology, was the cause of Ballo's suicide. TV 2 reported that psychologists advised that subsequent to the OCA, there should be proper follow-up attention with the subject. In an analysis of personality tests available online on social networking sites, Andreas Høstmælingen of the Norwegian Psychological Association cited Ballo as "an example of how wrong things can go". The Association warned individuals against taking such types of personality tests.

== Kaja: 1988–2008 ==
Olav Ballo subsequently wrote a book about her suicide. He decided not to give press interviews about his ordeal until the book was published. He wanted to be able to tell the story and impact of his daughter's death, on his own terms. Titled, Kaja: 1988–2008, the book explores the sequence of events that led to Ballo's death. Her early history of psychiatric treatment is discussed in the book. Olav recounts the difficulties in getting information about Ballo's death from government authorities. According to the author, there was a slow response in receiving help from Norway's Foreign Ministry.

In an interview with Politiken, Olav explained the motivation for writing the book: "After the funeral I felt I had to do something relating to grief. This was my way to process the grief. The second issue was that I needed to transcribe the account to later tell my little daughter Oda." He also said, "I wanted to contribute to greater openness about suicide." He acknowledged, "Losing a child means that life is turned upside down. I believe that grief becomes heavier if you do not share it with anyone." The book was written with input from other family members.

Kaja: 1988–2008 became a bestseller in Norway. Kaja: 1988–2008 sparked renewed controversy over perceptions of Scientology activities in Norway. In a review of the book, Dagbladet noted that because the author was writing both as a private individual and as a physician, "he is trained to look at the familiar and intimate with professionalism and distance." Upon the book's publication, Matthias Fosse stated, "Church of Scientology had absolutely nothing to do with this young woman's decision to take her own life. We are sorry for the loss the family has suffered, but this young woman was never a member of the Church of Scientology and never participated in any of the church activities."

== See also ==
- List of suicides (A–M)
- Scientology controversies
- Scientology in France: Suicide of Patrice Vic
- Scientology in Norway
- Scientology and the legal system
- Scientology and psychiatry
