= Ingrid Skjoldvær =

Norwegian environmentalist (born 1993)

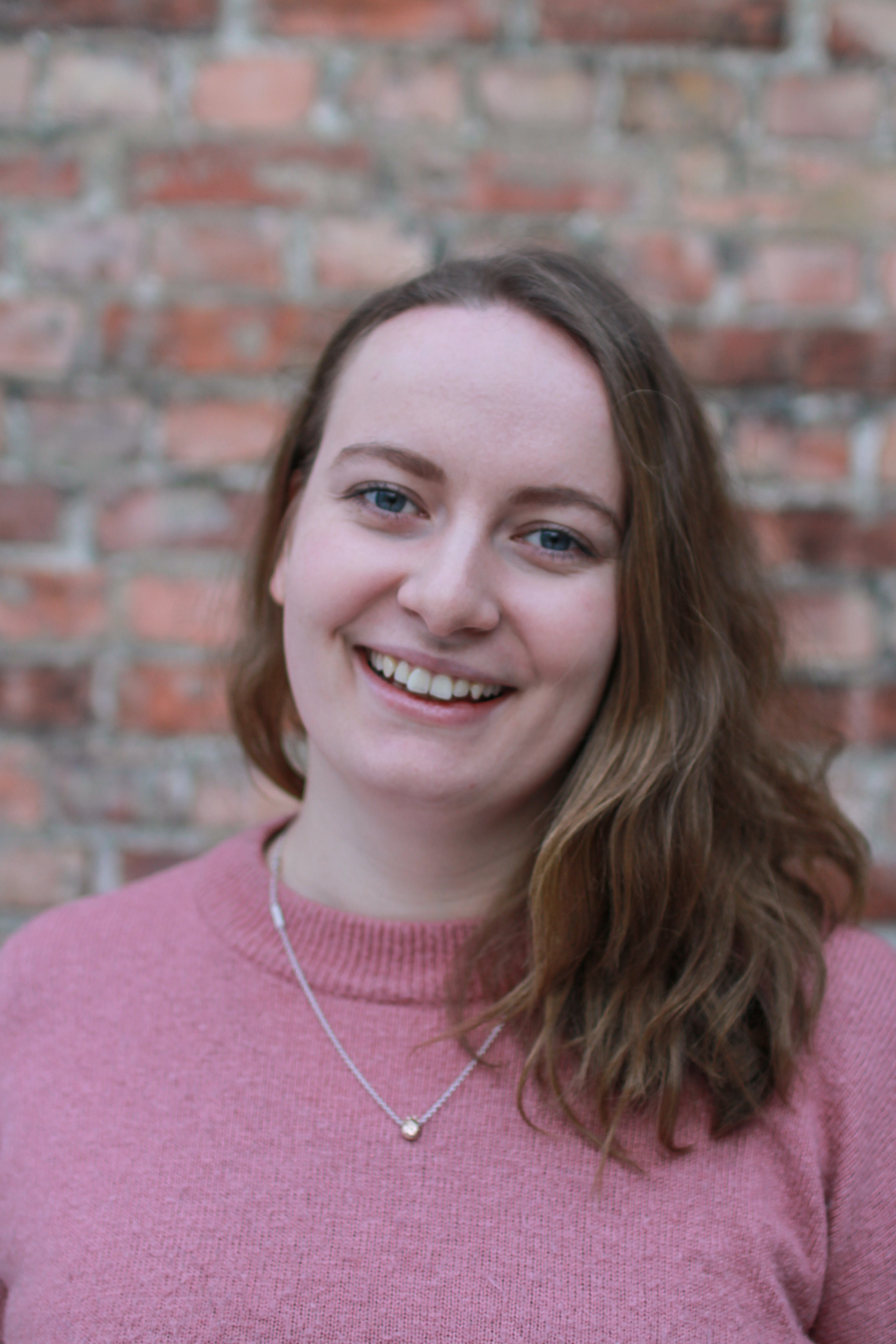
- Ingrid Skjoldvær
- Born: 8 August 1993 (age 33); Sortland, Vesterålen, Norway
- Occupation: Environmentalist
- Years active: 2016–present
- Organisations: Nature and Youth; Folkeaksjonen
- Predecessor: Arnstein Vestre (2014–2016)
- Successor: Gaute Eiterjord (2018–present)

Ingrid Skjoldvær (born 8 August 1993) is a Norwegian environmentalist and a former chairperson of the youth environmental organisation Nature and Youth. She comes from Sortland Municipality in Vesterålen and has held several positions in the organisation, most recently as deputy chairperson, before she was elected as head of the organisation on 10 January 2016, a position she held until 2017.

== Environmental action ==
Skjoldvær was involved in the actions against Nordic Mining's planned mining project at Førdefjorden in February 2016. Outside this event, she has been particularly involved in Nature and Youth's action against oil. Skjoldvær has also been employed in the environmental foundation Bellona as a senior oil advisor, and in the past has sat on the National Board of the Norwegian Society for the Conservation of Nature from 2015 to 2017. She is currently the Deputy Chair of the People's Action for Oil Free Lofoten, Vesterålen and Senja (Folkeaksjonen).

During 2018, Nature and Youth combined forces with Greenpeace and Grandparents Climate Campaign to sue the Norwegian government for opening new areas of the Arctic for oil drilling. The coalition of the three environmental groups argued that the move by the government violated the Norwegian Constitution as well as the nation's commitment to the Paris Agreement. The courts ruled that current and proposed Arctic drilling did not violate the constitutional right to a healthy climate.

However, success came for Skjoldvær in April 2019, when the actions of Folkeaksjonen, as well as its collaboration with other Norwegian NGOs and politicians led to the permanent protection of Lofoten, Vesterålen and Senja from oil drilling.
