= Bård Lahn =

Norwegian environmentalist and writer (born 1983)

Bård Lappegård Lahn
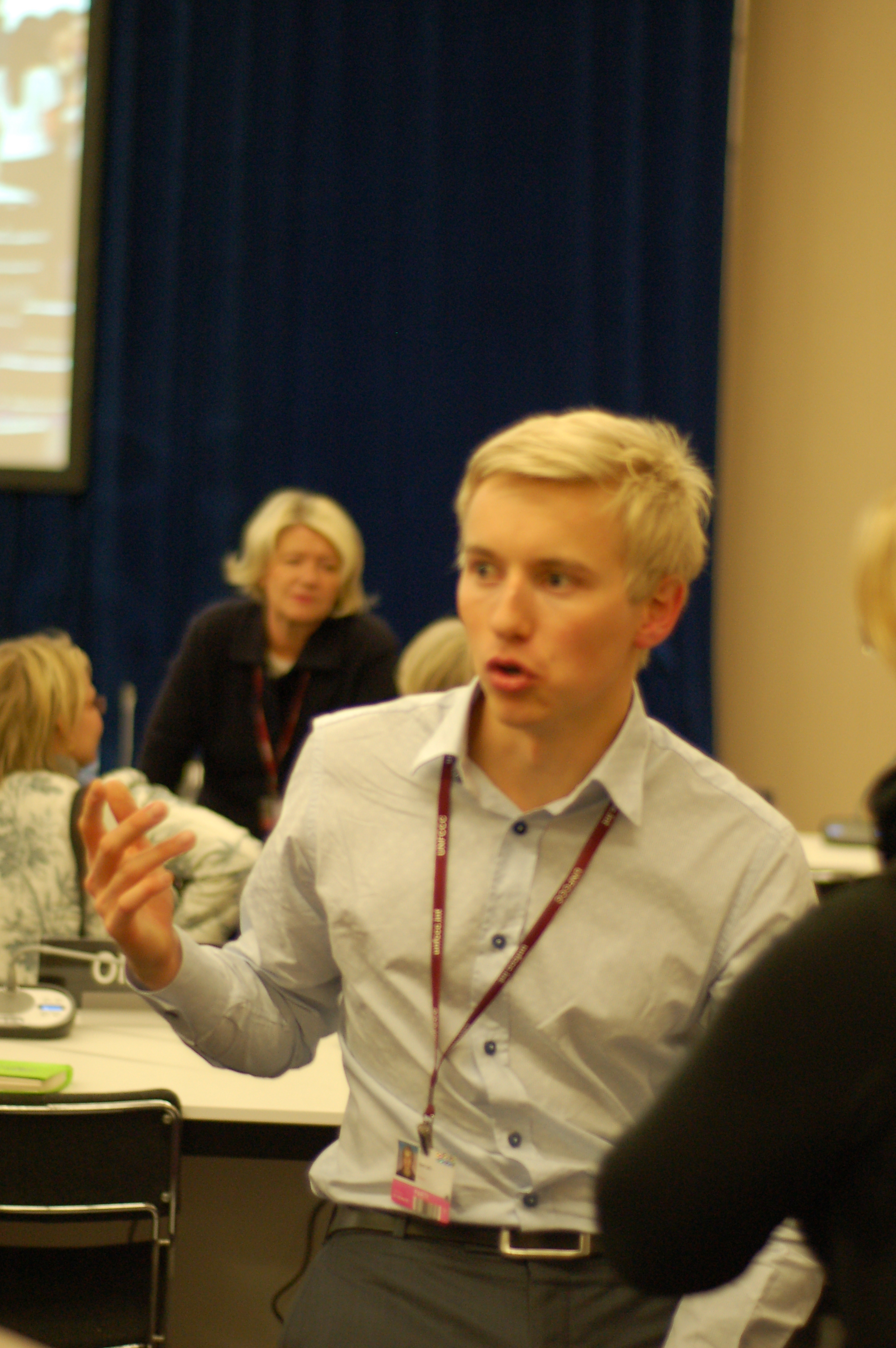
- Bård Lahn at UNFCCC Barcelona in 2009
- Born: 26 May 1983 (age 42); Stange, Norway

Bård Lappegård Lahn (born 26 May 1983 in Stange, Norway) is a Norwegian environmentalist and writer. He is an associate professor at the University of Oslo and a researcher at CICERO, Centre for International Climate and Environmental Research. His research focuses on climate politics, sociology, and Science and Technology Studies.

He has previously worked as an adviser on international climate policy in the Norwegian Society for the Conservation of Nature, and from 2006 to 2008 he was chairman of the environmental NGO Natur og Ungdom. Prior to his leadership he had been deputy chairman since 2003 and an active member of Natur og Ungdom since the mid-1990s.

Lahn has served on several boards, including the board of the Sophie Prize, and is currently chairman of the board for the Minor Foundation for Major Challenges. In the early 1990s, he had his own section in the children's TV show Newtons Hage on the Norwegian TV channel Norsk Rikskringkasting.

Preceded by Ane Hansdatter Kismul	Chairman of Natur og Ungdom; 2006–2007	Succeeded by Ingeborg Gjærum
