= Scientology in Norway =

Church of Scientology Norway
- Scientologi Kirken Norgen
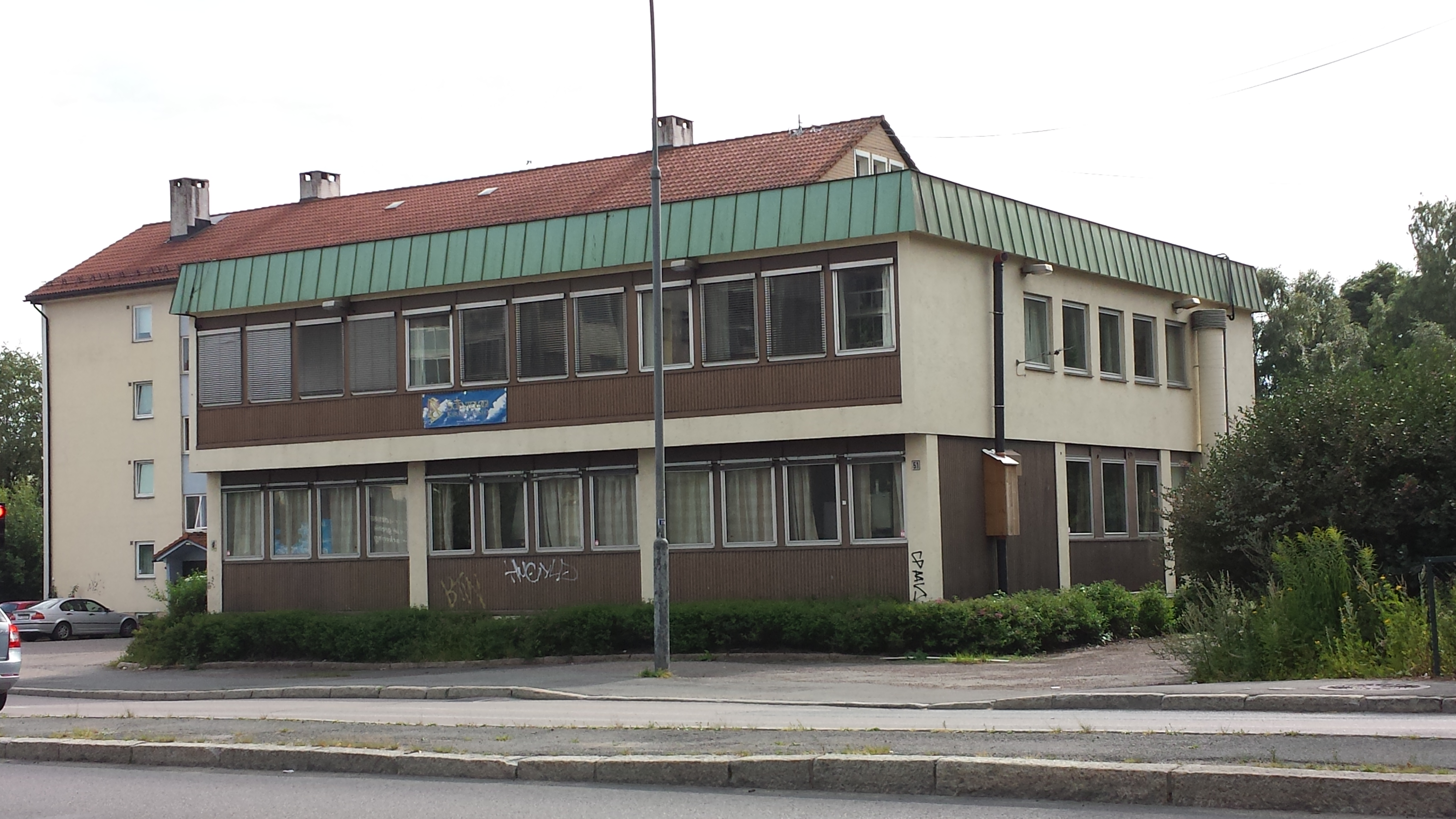
- The former site of Scientologikirken in Grünerløkka, Oslo, as it appeared in 2013. Subsequently, the premises were vacated and the building was demolished.
- Legal status: Non-profit corporation
- Coordinates: 59.9311°N 10.7975°E
- Members: 100 (estimated)
- Parent organization: Church of Scientology International
- Website: www.scientology-oslo.org

The Church of Scientology in Norway (Norwegian: Scientologi Kirken Norge) is officially recognised as a non-profit corporation of the Church of Scientology, rather than a religious community. Despite an estimated 8,000 individuals having participated in Scientology-related courses in Norway, the active membership within the church is estimated around 100 members as of 2016.

Scientology’s has one church in Norway which is situated in Oslo. The church has shifted its physical location within the city. Its previous sites have included upscale offices in central areas like Karl Johans gate and Tollbugata, and others such as Grünerløkka. It is currently located in Lørenvangen.

Legal disputes involving Scientologikirken often result in settlements outside of court. In one case, the church was directed to reimburse a former member 600,000 Norwegian kroner in course fees. The organization has also engaged in an unsuccessful legal endeavor spanning six years, aimed at obtaining official recognition as a religion.

Given the limited number of active members and the absence of government subsidies, the church operates primarily with income from participants who pay for individual courses.

== Controversies ==
In 2008, the Church of Scientology was investigated for connections between it and the death of Kaja Ballo. Ballo, a Norwegian citizen, died by suicide shortly after taking an Oxford Capacity Analysis, a personality test administered by the organisation, earlier the same day. Prosecutors were subsequently unable to establish a causative link.

As a result of the bad light that was shed upon the church, it has become vastly unpopular and controversial in Norway. Members usually keep a low profile and are reluctant to share their religious beliefs. Norwegians in general regard Scientologikirken as a cult.

Despite low membership numbers, the Norwegian community has made a name for itself among opposition-groups. There are often protests outside of the Oslo church, with Anonymous being very present. This is not the only reason; Andreas Heldal-Lund is a known critic of Scientology, and is the founder of xenu.net and Operation Clambake.

In August 2015, a banner was displayed on the front facade of the Scientologikirken headquarters bearing the message "New homes, coming soon." This indicated that the church was no longer occupying the premises. Subsequently, the church returned to its previous headquarters on Tollbugata; however, it left behind unpaid rent totaling nine months' worth, amounting to 292,434 Norwegian kroner or approximately $33,707.
