= Tore Killingland =

Norwegian politician (born 1953)

Tore Killingland (born 1953) is a Norwegian business manager, environmentalist and politician for the Liberal Party.

He took his cand.mag. degree at the University of Oslo. He was a co-founder and chairman of Natur og Ungdom (1971–1973), worked for the Norwegian Ministry of the Environment, the Norwegian Consumer Council and the Norwegian Directorate for Nature Management. From 1997 to 2000 he was a political advisor in the Ministry of Transport and Communications, and from February to March 2000 he was appointed State Secretary in the Office of the Prime Minister. Between 2002 and 2006 he served as secretary-general of Friends of the Earth Norway. He was a former assisting secretary-general.

He left as secretary-general in December 2006, and became CEO of EnPro in February 2007. He resigned later in 2007, and was hired as leader of the "Green Team" in Burson-Marsteller. He was also hired as manager of the foundation Green in Practice, but he backed out as the existence of the foundation was threatened. In 2009 he became manager of Jernbanealliansen.

Non-profit organization positions
Preceded by Geir Tveit	Chairman of Natur og Ungdom; 1971–1973	Succeeded by Preben Ottesen
