= Silje Lundberg =

Norwegian environmentalist

Silje Ask Lundberg
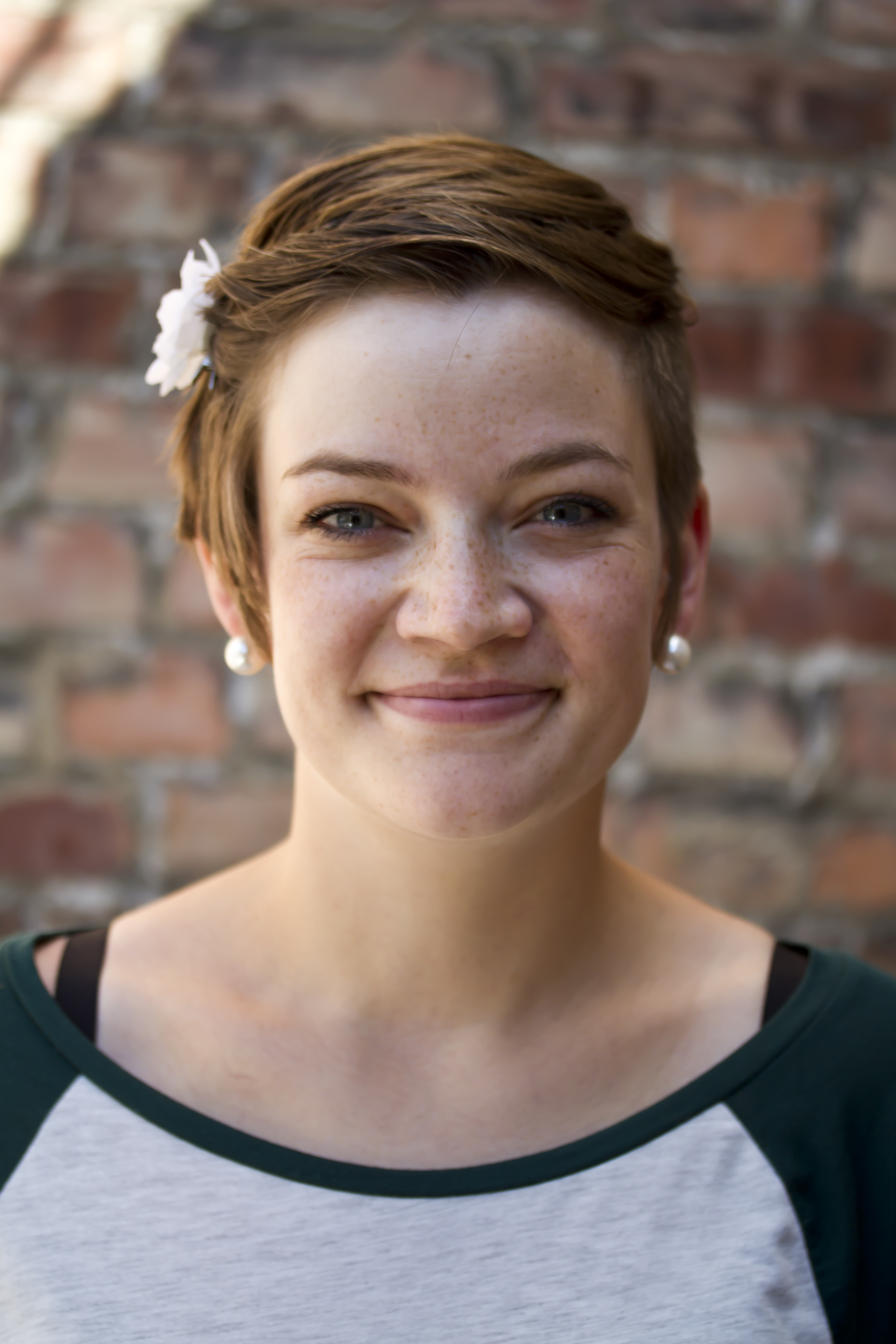
- Silje Lundberg in 2012
- Born: 13 April 1988 (age 37); Oslo, Norway
- Occupation: Chairman of Norwegian Society for the Conservation of Nature

Silje Ask Lundberg (born 13 April 1988 in Oslo) is a Norwegian environmentalist and chairperson of Norwegian Society for the Conservation of Nature (Friends of the Earth Norway). She is a former leader of Nature and Youth. She grew up in Harstad in Northern Norway. Prior to her leadership, she has been deputy chairman and been working for other environmental organisations, such as ZERO and Bellona Foundation.

Preceded by Ola Skaalvik Elvevold	Leader of Natur og Ungdom; 2012–2014	Incumbent
