= Putsj =

Norwegian environmental magazine

- Editor: Sol Sandvik
- Categories: Political magazine
- Frequency: Bimonthly
- First issue: 2000
- Company: Natur og Ungdom
- Country: Norway
- Based in: Oslo
- Language: Norwegian
- Website: http://www.putsj.no

Putsj is a magazine affiliated with the Norwegian environmental organisation Natur og Ungdom (Nature and Youth). The magazine was started in 2000. It is a youth magazine writing about topics related to youth, activism, culture and environmentalism. The headquarters of the magazine is in Oslo.

Putsj is a print and a web magazine. The paper issue is published four times a year. The magazine is designed by Isabelle Poole and edited by Sol Sandvik. In addition to these, idealistic writers, photographers and illustrators contribute to the making of Putsj.
