= Ola Skaalvik Elvevold =

Norwegian environmentalist

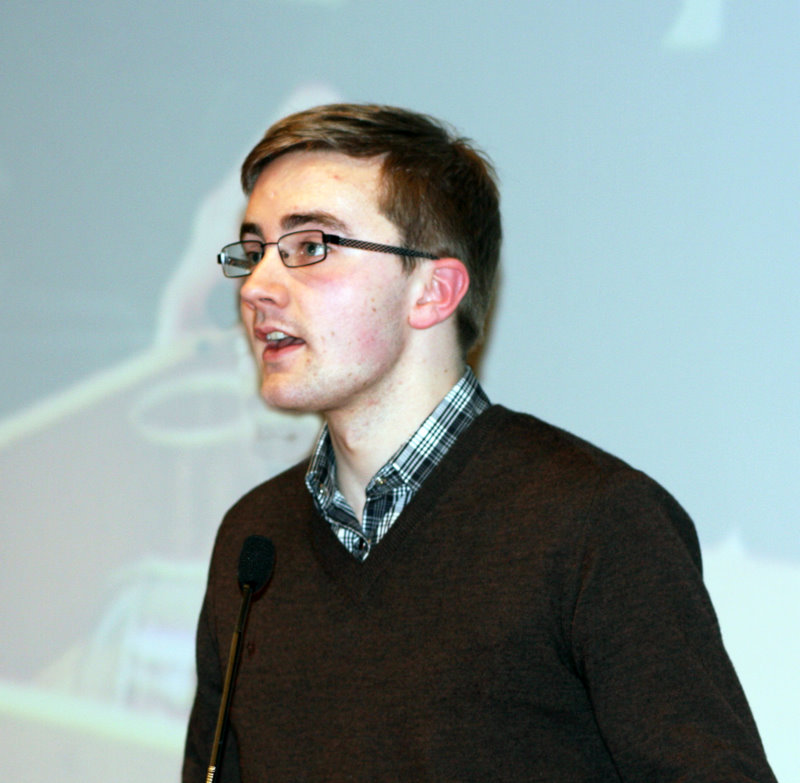
- Ola Skaalvik Elvevold in 2010
- Born: 12 June 1988 (age 38); Tromsø, Norway
- Occupation: Chairman of Natur og Ungdom

Ola Skaalvik Elvevold (born 12 June 1988 in Tromsø) is a Norwegian environmentalist. He is a former chairman (2010–2012) of Natur og Ungdom, a youth environment protecting organisation. Prior to his leadership, he had served as the organisation's deputy chairman since 2008.

Preceded by Ingeborg Gjærum	Chairman of Natur og Ungdom; 2010–2011	Succeeded by Silje Lundberg
