= Eco-Agents =

Norwegian environmental organization

- Founded: 1992
- Type: NGO
- Purpose: Environmentalism
- Region served: Norway
- Members: 3,000

Eco-Agents (Norwegian: Miljøagentene) is a member-based environmental organization for children. A subsidiary of the Norwegian Society for the Conservation of Nature, it has 3000 members. The three focus issues are conservation of nature, global warming and consumption.

The organization was founded in 1992 as Blekkulfs venner, later Blekkulfts miljødetektiver. In 2006, it changed to the current name, and discontinued its cooperation with the mascot Blekkulf, a fictional octopus. The reason was in part to communicate better with older children, and in part because the organization had problems funding the license fees to the creators of the fictional characters.

In 2015, the Children's Climate Panel was started by the Environmental Agents.

Every year, the Environmental Agents organize the school competition Batterijakten and Beintøft.
