= Nature and Youth =

Norwegian youth environmental organisation

Natur og Ungdom
- Type: Non-governmental organization
- Industry: Environmentalism
- Founded: 18 November 1967
- Headquarters: Oslo, Norway
- Area served: Norway
- Key people: Sigrid Margrethe Losnegård
- Number of employees: 24 (2015)
- Website: nu.no

Natur og Ungdom (NU) which translates to Nature and Youth, also known in English as Young Friends of the Earth Norway, is a Norwegian youth environmental protection organisation. It is the only environmentalist youth organisation in Norway. 7,000 members, in 80 local groups, work on environmental issues throughout the country. Officially, NU is the youth branch of the Norwegian Society for the Conservation of Nature. The organisation is led by Sigrid Margrethe Losnegård.

The main issues the organisation works with include petroleum, public transport, energy, and nature conservation. In addition to local groups, there is a central board with 15 members that works on national issues and an administration; both are located in Oslo.

Natur og Ungdom is a member of Friends of the Earth International, and publishes the magazine Putsj.

== History ==
In 1967, the Norwegian Society for the Conservation of Nature (NNV) had announced that they wanted a youth organization, and the two organisations, Norsk Feltbiologisk Ungdomsforening (NFU) and Oslo Katedralskoles Naturvernforening, decided to merge on November 18, 1967. The organisation had a difficult start with few members and a complicated organization, but in the 1970s, NU got better organised with more local groups. Focus in this period was agriculture. But in the 1970s, nuclear power became a hot issue in Norway and NU gained organizational strength as it opposed the plans, and won a victory when it was decided to not build nuclear power in Norway.

Through the 1970s and 1980s, the organization worked with many issues, including the Alta controversy, and also to prevent environmental contamination, especially from industry. In 1984 members from NU and Greenpeace chained themselves to the factory Titania in Sokndal Municipality in a civil disobedience action to prohibit the dumping of 2.2 million tonnes oil and rockdust mixed with chemicals in Dyngadjupet near the mouth of the Jøssingfjorden. This was the first civil disobedience direct action taken on by NU. In 1990, Titania was required to deposit the waste on land, like the environmentalists had demanded.

During the end of the 1980s, environmentalism grew among the general population, further strengthening the organization with more members and local groups. In 1991, NU was the prime contributor to the Rotvoll protests, a fight to preserve a rich cultural area on the fringe of the city of Trondheim. In the EU referendum in 1994, NU worked actively against EU membership. During the late 1990s, the main focus was on trying to prevent the building of natural gas power plants in Norway and in the 2000s (decade), stopping the opening of the Barents Sea for petroleum production.

In December 2025, Nature and Youth was designated as an "undesirable organization" in Russia.

== Chairs ==
- Knut Skedsmo (1966–1968)
- Willy Klein (1968)
- Geir Tveit (1969)
- Tore Killingland (1971–1973)
- Preben Ottesen (1974)
- Espen Wæhle (1975)
- Karen Johanne Baalsrud (1976)
- Bjart Holtsmark (1977)
- Trond Amundsen (1978)
- Espen Koksvik (1979)
- Grete Bæverfjord (1980)
- Marit Smith (1981)
- Haakon Vennemo (1982)
- Inger Spangen (1983)
- Stig Horsberg (1984)
- Tom Christian Axelsen (1985–1986)
- Marianne Gjørv (1987–1988)
- Marit Nyborg (1988–1990)
- Åsne Berre Persen (1991–1992)
- Heidi Sørensen (1993–1994)
- Lars Haltbrekken (1995–1996)
- Silje Schei Tveitdal (1997–1998)
- Einar Håndlykken (1999–2000)
- Elin Lerum Boasson (2001–2002)
- Ane Hansdatter Kismul (2003–2005)
- Bård Lahn (2006–2007)
- Ingeborg Gjærum (2008–2009)
- Ola Skaalvik Elvevold (2010–2012)
- Silje Lundberg (2012–2014)
- Arnstein Vestre (2014–2016)
- Ingrid Skjoldvær (2016–2017)
- Gaute Eiterjord (2018–2019)
- Therese Hugstmyr Woie (2020–2021)
- Gina Gylver (2022–2024)
- Gytis Blaževičius (2024-2025)
- Sigrid Hoddevik Losnegård (2025-present)

== See also ==
- Young Greens of Norway
