= Elin Lerum Boasson =

Norwegian environmentalist (born 1978)

- Born: 28 May 1978 (age 48); Norway
- Occupation: Professor

Elin Lerum Boasson (born 28 May 1978) is a Norwegian professor of political science, at the Universitetet i Oslo, University of Oslo. She is also affiliated with CICERO, Center for International Climate Research.

She has a PhD in Political Science from the University of Oslo and has been a visiting scholar at the University of California, Berkeley and Harvard University.

She was charing Natur og Ungdom in 2001 and 2002. She became active in the organisation in 1991, and joined the board in 1997 before she was elected deputy chairperson in 1999.

| Preceded by Einar Håndlykken | Chairman of Natur og Ungdom; 2001–2002 | Succeeded by Ane Hansdatter Kismul |
