= Ingeborg Gjærum =

Norwegian environmentalist

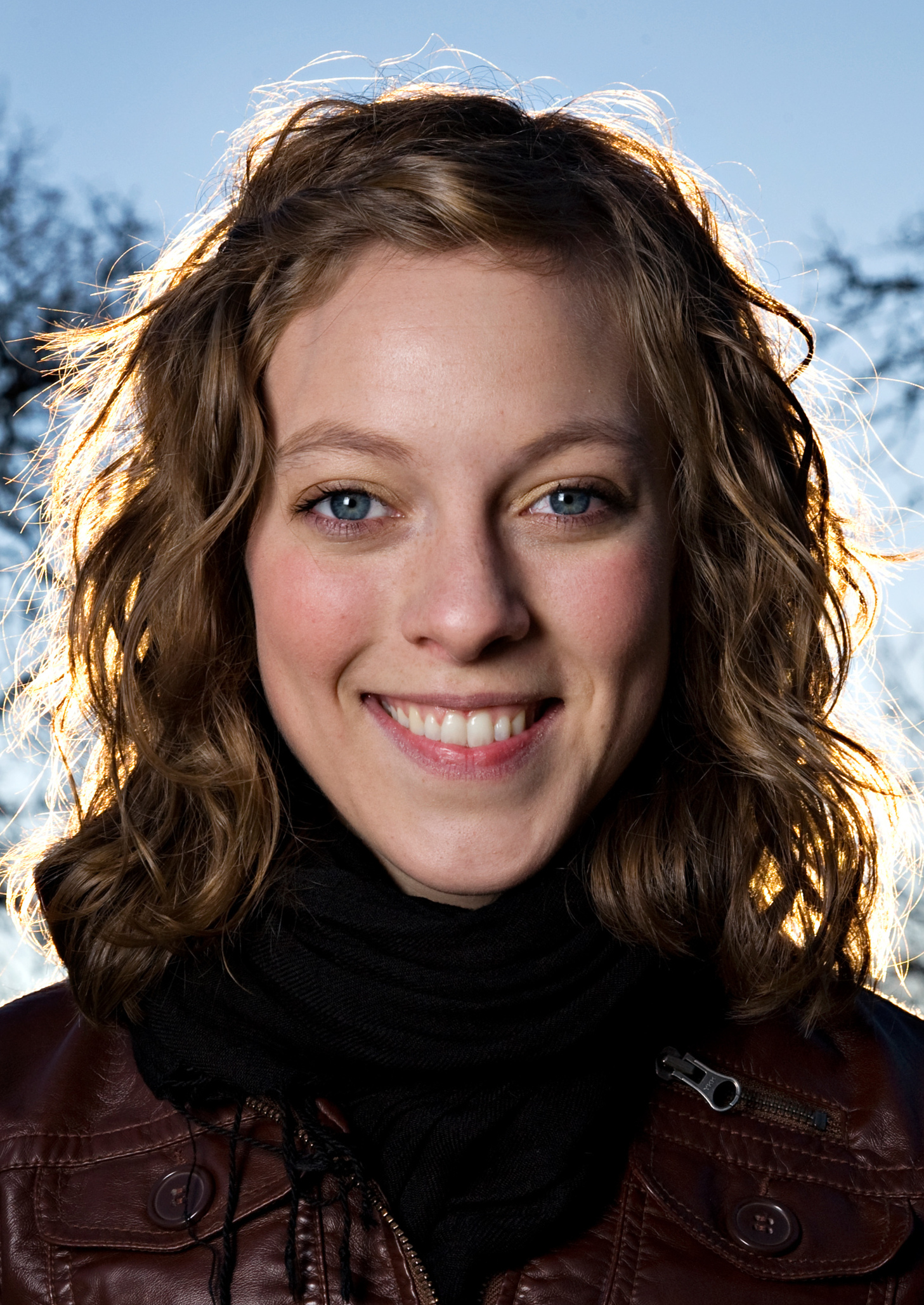
- Ingeborg Gjærum, in 2008
- Born: 16 April 1985 (age 40); Stange, Norway
- Occupation: Consultant

Ingeborg Gjærum (born 16 April 1985) is a Norwegian environmentalist.

She hails from Ottestad in Stange Municipality. She broke national news in 2005, when she was a central board member of the youth environment protecting organisation Natur og Ungdom. She served as its deputy leader from 2006 to 2008, and as its leader in 2008 and 2009.

In 2010 she was hired by the public relations firm Burson-Marsteller.

Preceded by Bård Lahn	Chairman of Natur og Ungdom; 2008–2009	Succeeded by Ola Skaalvik Elvevold
