= Ane Hansdatter Kismul =

Norwegian environmentalist and politician

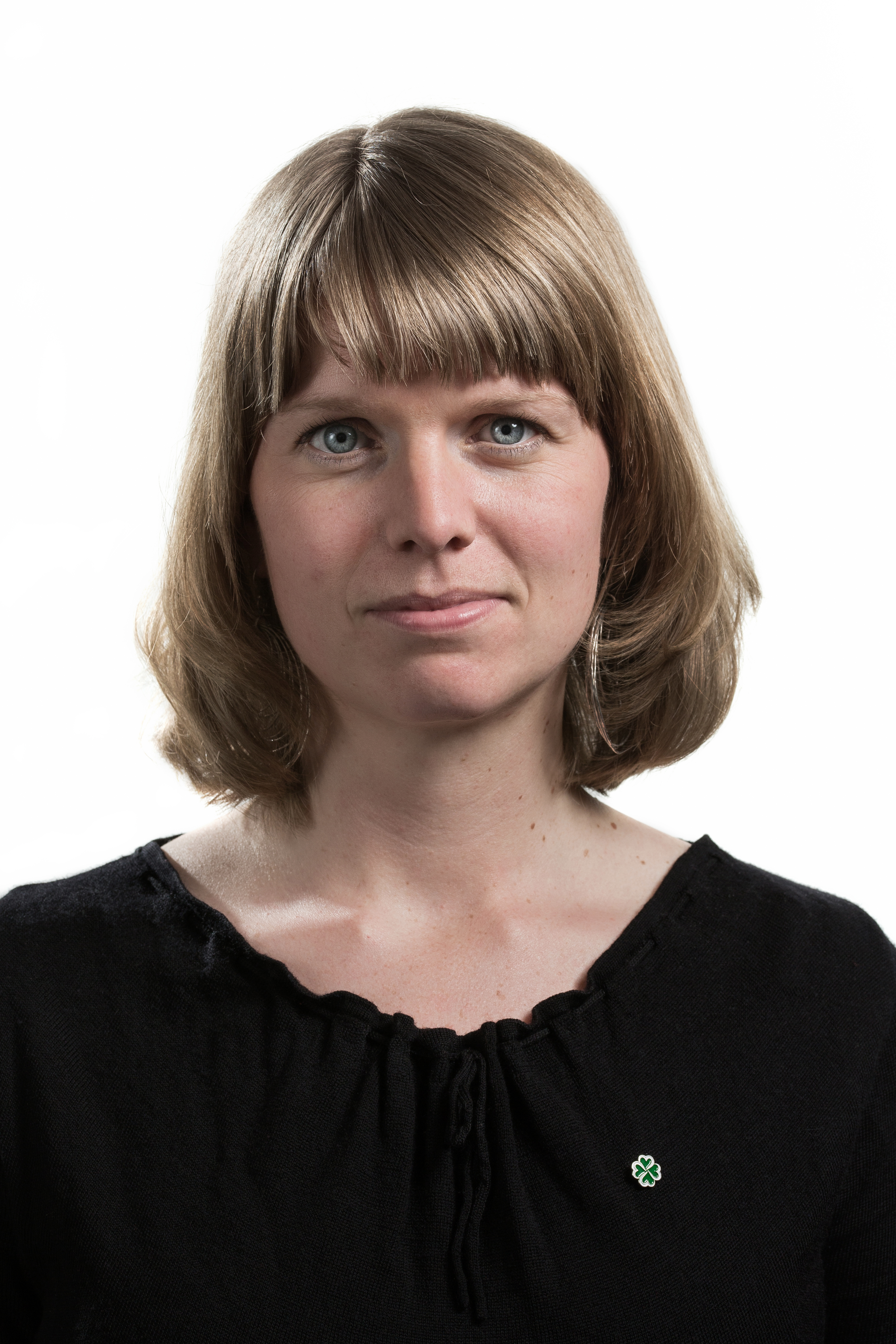
- Ane Hansdatter Kismul in 2013
- Born: 8 March 1980 (age 45); Mosjøen, Norway
- Occupation: Political advisor

Ane Hansdatter Kismul (born 8 March 1980 in Mosjøen) is a Norwegian environmentalist and politician for the Centre Party.

She joined Nature and Youth in 1996 and started a new local chapter in her native Mosjøen, the oldest town in the Helgeland region. In 2000 she was elected deputy leader and from 2003 to 2005 she was leader of the organization. She completed a bachelor's degree in political science at the University of Oslo in 2007. She was general secretary of the Norwegian Wind Energy Association in 2006 and 2007, when she was hired as advisor for the Centre Party's parliamentary group.

In July 2008, she was appointed as political advisor in the Ministry of Agriculture and Food. In September 2012 she was promoted to State Secretary in the Ministry of Petroleum and Energy.

Preceded by Elin Lerum Boasson	Chairman of Natur og Ungdom; 2003–2005	Succeeded by Bård Lahn
