= Einar Håndlykken =

Norwegian environmentalist

Einar Bakke Håndlykken
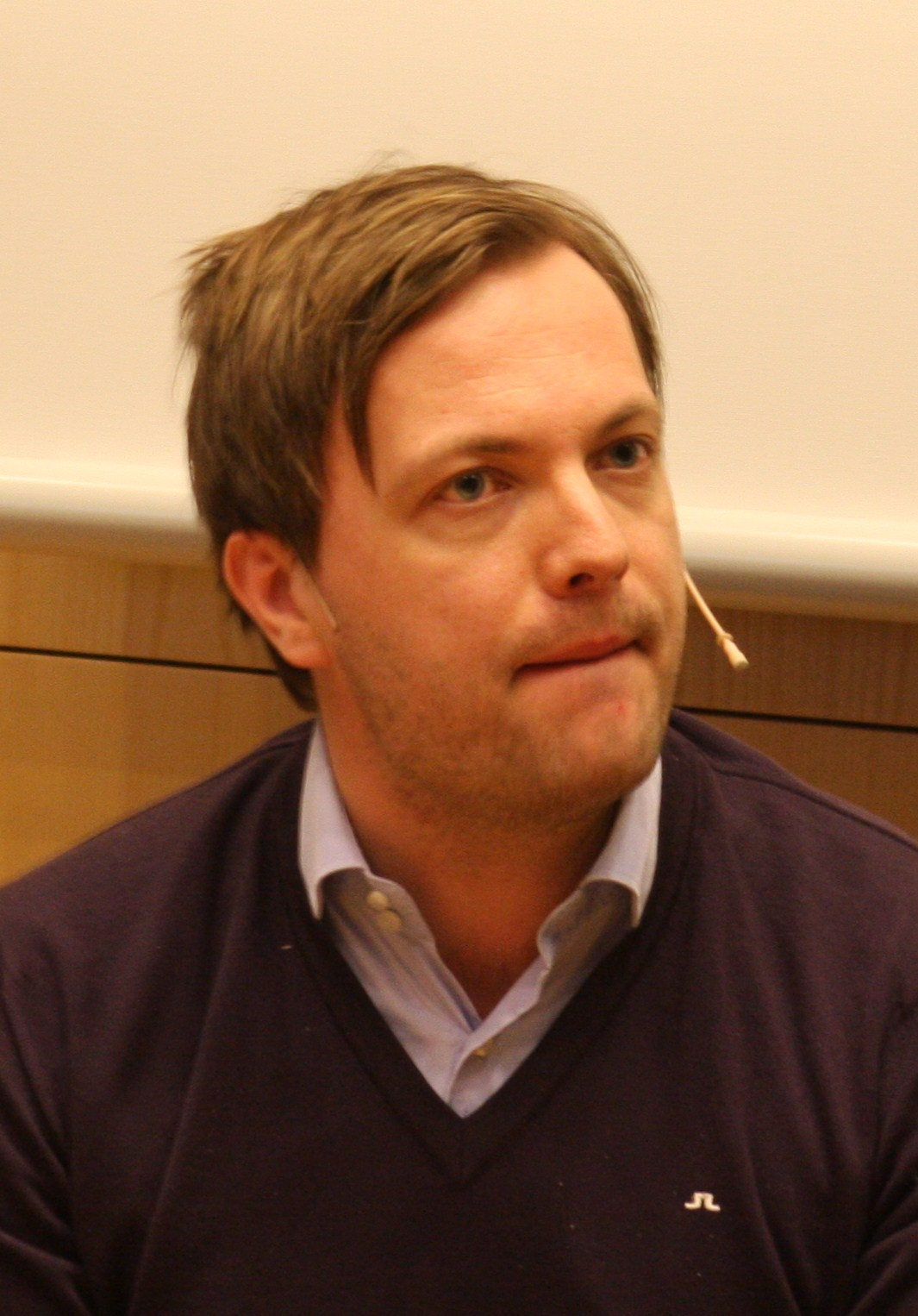
- Born: 9 August 1976 (age 48); Trondheim, Norway
- Occupation: Environmentalist CEOOdds Ballklubb

Einar Bakke Håndlykken (born 9 August 1976 in Trondheim, Norway) is a Norwegian environmentalist and director of the environmental foundation Zero Emission Resource Organisation (ZERO). Håndlykken started with environmentalism as a youth in Grenland Natur og Ungdom, and became deputy chairman of the national organisation in 1997 and served as its chairman in 1999 and 2000. He worked for Bellona from 2001 to 2002, when he co-founded ZERO.

Preceded by Silje Schei Tveitdal	Chairman of Natur og Ungdom; 1999–2000	Succeeded by Elin Lerum Boasson
