= Heidi Sørensen =

Norwegian politician (1970–2026)

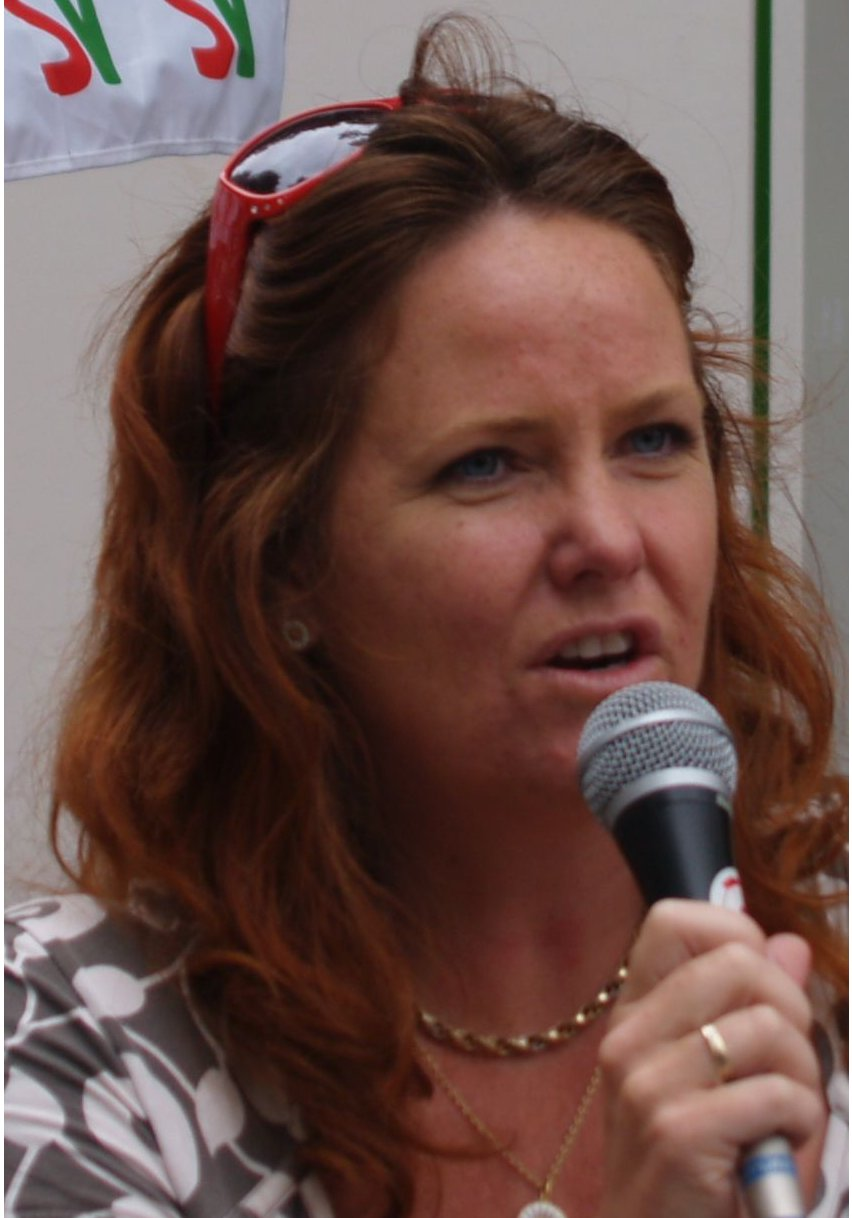
Sørensen in 2007

Heidi Sørensen (14 February 1970 – 25 April 2026) was a Danish-Norwegian politician for the Socialist Left Party.

== Life and career ==
With a Danish father, Sørensen held Danish citizenship in her early life. She was born in Levanger Municipality, and studied for a cand.mag. degree between 1989 and 1992. In her youth, Sørensen was an active environmentalist, and leader of Natur og Ungdom from 1993 to 1994, and later became leader of Friends of the Earth Norway between 1995 and 1998. She was also a working committee member in No to the EU from 1991 to 1995.

Sørensen was elected to the Parliament of Norway from Oslo in 2001, but was not re-elected in 2005. She instead served as a deputy representative, but met on a regular basis as Kristin Halvorsen was appointed to Stoltenberg's Second Cabinet. In October 2007 Sørensen left Parliament to work for the Cabinet, serving as State Secretary in the Ministry of the Environment. Upon her resignation in 2012, she returned to Parliament where she again served as a replacement for Kristin Halvorsen until the term ended in 2013.

She was a member of the Norwegian Consumer Council from 1997 to 2001, the Norwegian Board of Technology from 1999, the board of the Research Council of Norway from 2000 and the Norwegian School of Sport Sciences from 2013. She was also a member of committees producing Norwegian Official Reports on energy and waste management.

Sørensen died of cancer on 25 April 2026, at the age of 56.

Preceded by Stein Malkenes	Chairman of Friends of the Earth Norway; 1995–1998	Succeeded by Erik Solheim
Preceded by Åsne Berre Persen	Chairman of Natur og Ungdom; 1993–1995	Succeeded by Lars Haltbrekken
