= Grefsen Church =

Coordinates: 59°57′15.196″N 10°46′45.361″E

- Grefsen kirke
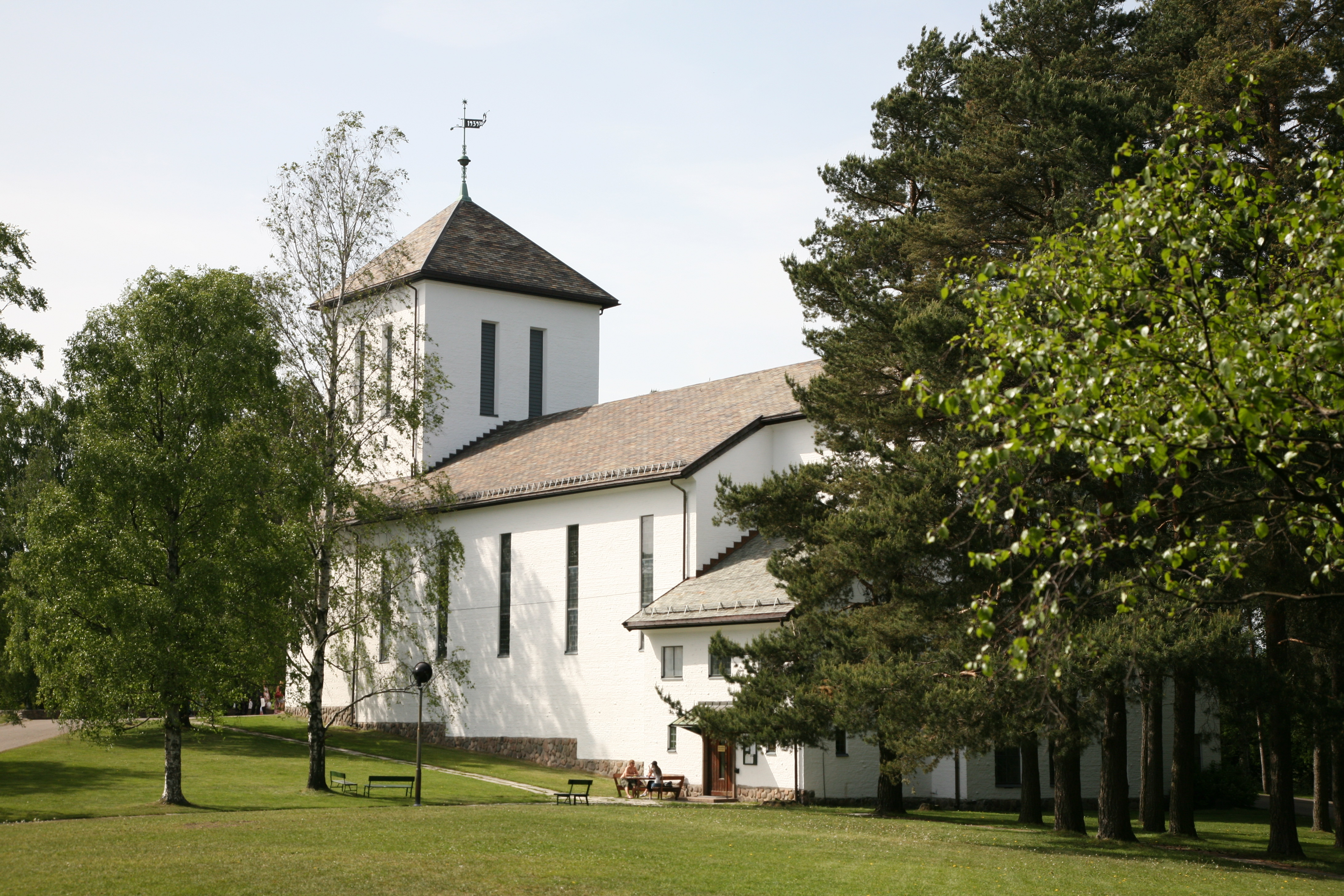

- Location in Oslo Grefsen Church (Norway)
- Location: Oslo
- Country: Norway
- Denomination: Church of Norway
- Churchmanship: Evangelical Lutheran

History
- Status: Parish church

Architecture
- Functional status: Active
- Architect: Georg Greve
- Completed: 1940

Specifications
- Capacity: 600
- Materials: Brick

Administration
- Diocese: Diocese of Oslo
- Deanery: Nordre Aker

Grefsen Church is a long church (Norwegian: langkirke) located in Grefsen, a neighborhood of Oslo, Norway.

The church was consecrated by Bishop Eivind Berggrav on March 3, 1940 and it is the parish church of the Grefsen Parish. It is built of brick, has a frescoed ceiling, and can accommodate 600 people. It was designed by the architect Georg Greve. The building has elements of the Norwegian Romanesque style, but has rectangular window openings instead of Romanesque arches. It is sparsely decorated. The stained glass in the chancel was created by Oddmund Kristiansen. Grefsen Church has protected status as a church listed by the Norwegian Directorate for Cultural Heritage. Magne Elvestrand served as organist at the church from 1940 to 1967.

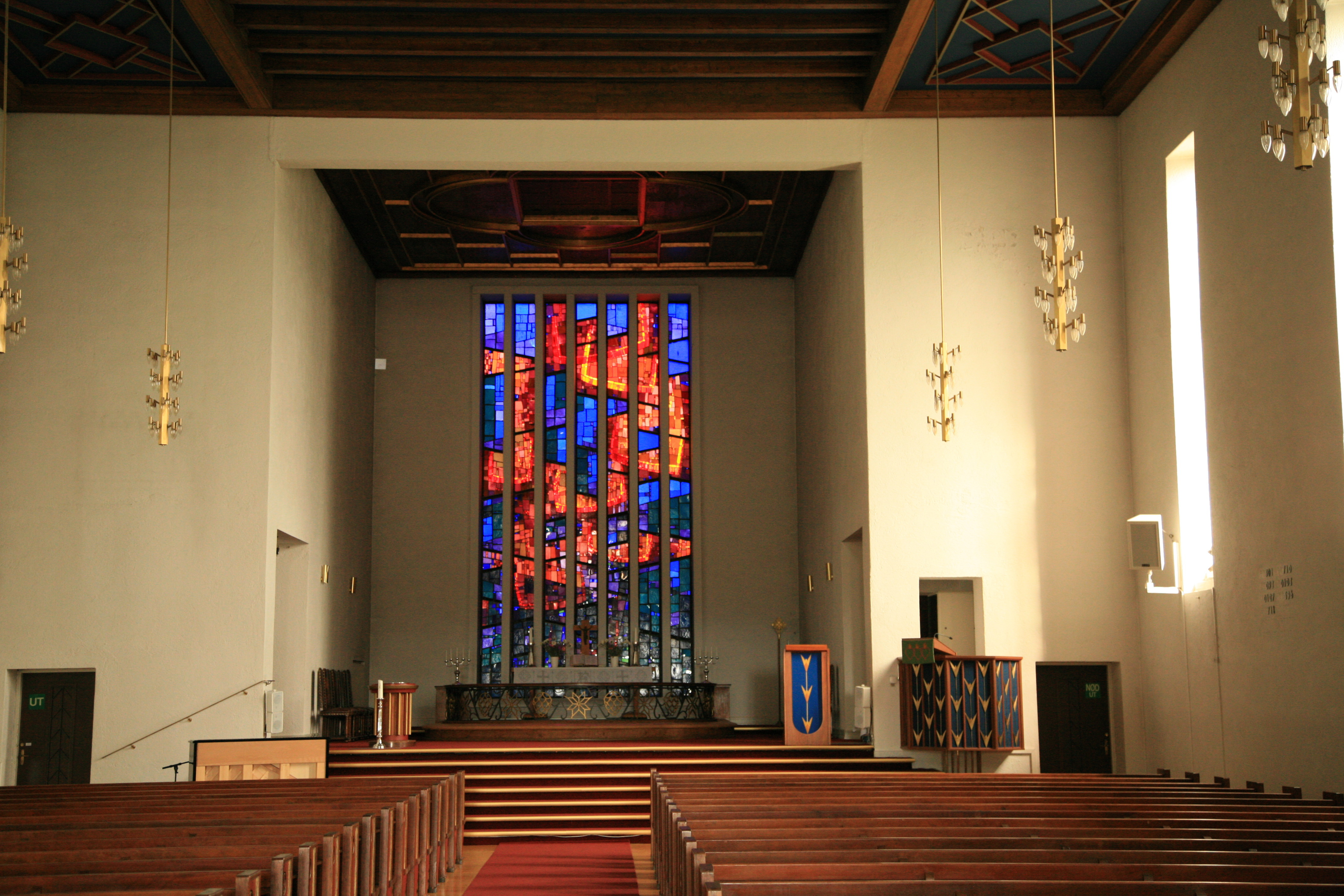
Interior view towards the altar
