= Oxford Capacity Analysis =

Test administered by the Church of Scientology

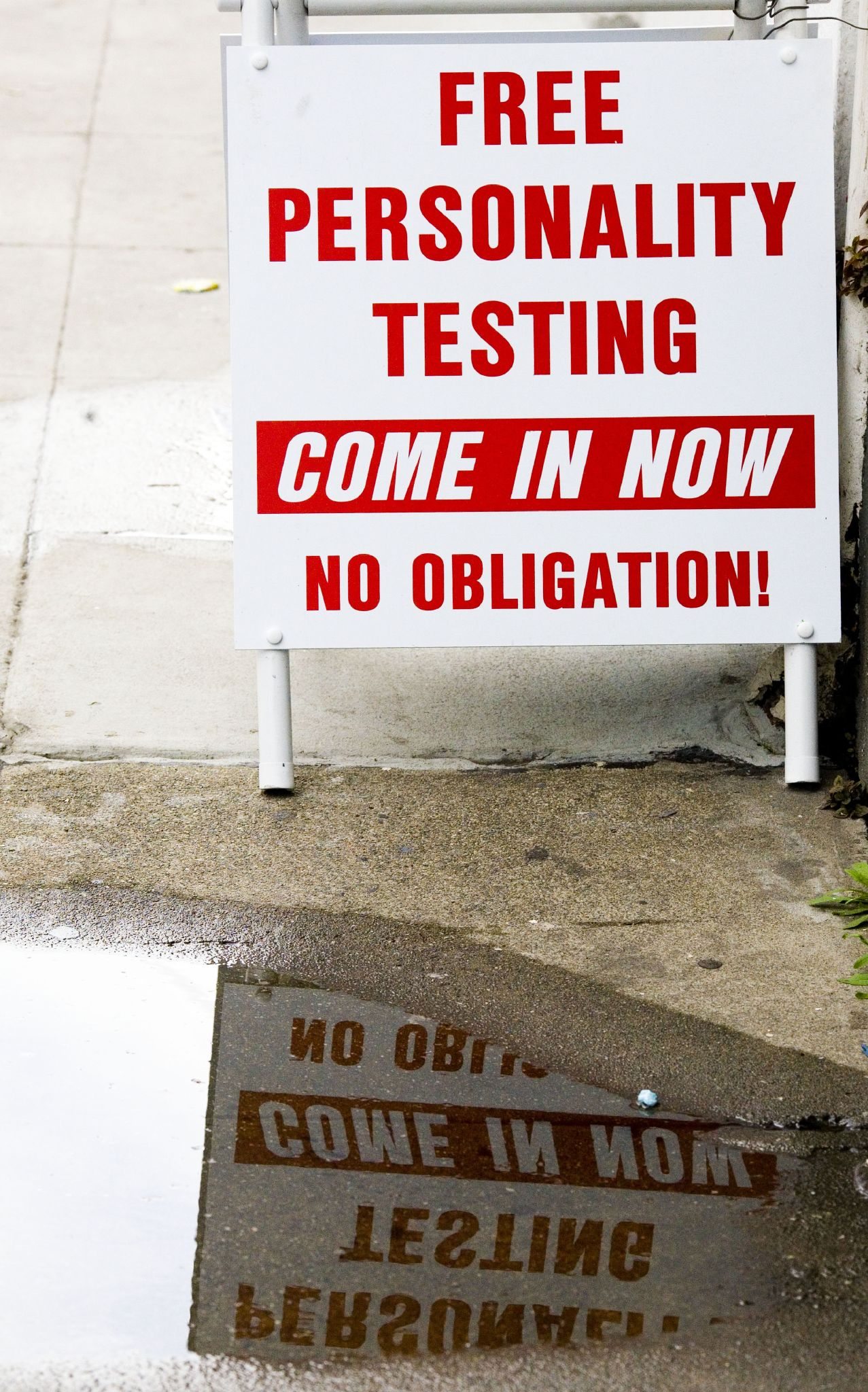
Sign advertising Scientology personality tests

The Oxford Capacity Analysis (OCA), also known as the American Personality Analysis, is a list of questions which is advertised as being a personality test and that is administered for free by the Church of Scientology as part of its recruitment process. The organization offers the test online, at its local sites, and sometimes at local fairs, carnivals, and in other public settings. It has no relation to the University of Oxford, although the name may have been chosen to imply a link.

The test is an important part of Scientology recruitment and is used worldwide by the Church of Scientology to attract new members. However, it is not a scientifically recognized test and has been criticized by numerous psychology organizations, who point out that it is not a genuine personality test and that Scientology recruiters use it in a highly manipulative and unethical fashion.

== Questions ==
Two hundred questions make up the Scientology personality test. Each can be answered 'yes', 'no', or 'maybe'. Typical questions include:

3. Do you browse through railway timetables, directories or dictionaries just for pleasure?

6. Do you get occasional twitches of your muscles, when there is no logical reason for it?

27. Do you often sing or whistle just for the fun of it?

30. Do you enjoy telling people the latest scandal about your associates?

59. Do you consider the modern prisons without bars system "doomed to failure"?

69. Does emotional music have quite an effect on you?

105. Do you rarely suspect the actions of others?

124. Do you often make tactless blunders?

196. Do you sometimes feel that your age is against you (too young or too old)?

— Oxford Capacity Analysis, 1997

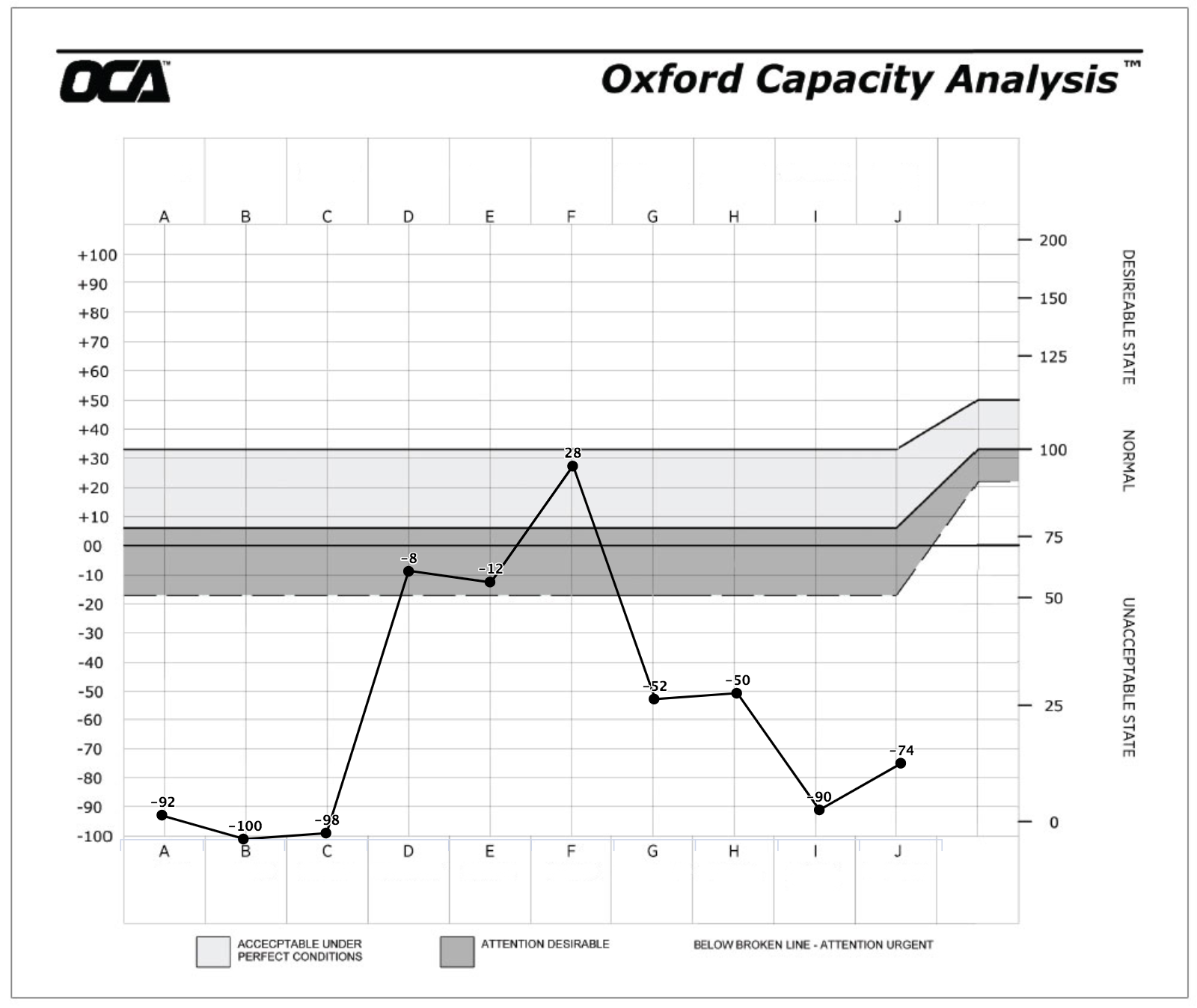

The OCA test is often given at the same time as a "Novis Mental Ability Test," a short 30 minute test which Scientology recruiters claim measures IQ. After the two tests have been completed, a computer program is used to plot the results on a personality profile graph. This gives the testee's IQ rating and score in personality characteristics such as "Stable," "Happy," "Composed," "Certainty," "Active," "Aggressive," "Responsible (Causative)," "Correct Estimation" (meaning the testee's ability to look at a situation and determine what is needed to deal with it), "Appreciative," and "Comm[unication] Level" (meaning the testee's ability to communicate with others).

The scale on the graph of each trait ranges from +100 to −100, with three main bands marked "Desirable State" (+100 to +30), "Normal" (+30 to 0) and "Unacceptable State" (0 to −100). In the middle are two shaded bands, "Acceptable under perfect conditions" (about +32 to about +6) and "Attention Desirable" (about +6 to about −18). A legend at the foot of the graph sheet warns that a point below the latter band indicates "Attention Urgent."

After the graph has been plotted, a Scientology staff member reviews the results with the testee.

== Role ==
=== Development ===
Even before the Church of Scientology had fashioned its own test, founder L. Ron Hubbard made personality tests central to the business. In his 1951 book, Science of Survival, he recommended the use of existing psychometric exams, including the California Test for Mental Maturity.

In the mid-1950s, the project to create Hubbard's own test began, with Hubbard commissioning a longtime follower, Julia Salman Lewis, to produce one. Her first effort, the American Personality Analysis (APA), failed to satisfy Hubbard so, in 1959, he asked a friend and Scientologist, Ray Kemp, to broaden the scope of the test. Wrote Kemp:

Ron asked me whether it would be possible to write a test that was more general in nature, and would enable him to see in the test what he was looking for. He also wanted it to be in the same general format as the APA and if possible to have both tests interchangeable in the matter of what he wanted to see as information. Quite a task. As a result of quite a few months works, I eventually devised the Oxford Capacity Analysis (OCA). Note that it did not test personality, but rather the capacity of any person with respect to various traits and syndromes.

The Scientology organization first announced its test in an article by Kemp, who hailed the OCA in the pages of Certainty, the magazine of the Hubbard Association of Scientologists in London. Later, the church gave credit to Hubbard for the test and trademarked the terms "OCA" and "Oxford Capacity Analysis." The copyright holder is L. Ron Hubbard Library, a business alias of the Church of Spiritual Technology.

At first, the test was reserved by the Scientology organization solely for existing members, and was not used on members of the public who could potentially be recruited into Scientology. However, following a recruitment drive in Johannesburg, South Africa in 1960, the organization began to use the test on members of the public. The South African campaign had kicked off with a newspaper ad:

IQ TESTED

THE JOHANNESBURG TEST CENTRE offers for a limited time, free intelligence and personality tests. Your IQ, personality and aptitude determine your future.

Know them. No obligations.

23, Hancock Street, Joubert Park, Johannesburg.

Phone. 44-9075

— L. Ron Hubbard, "Testing Promotion Revised", HCO Policy Letter, 1960

Respondents were tested in the Johannesburg Scientology office, having been told:

These are old tests reworked and modernized and coordinated with an electro-psycho-galvanometer [an e-meter]. The results are more accurate than psychological tests. This is Scientometry. This is not psychology. These tests are more modern, being electronically coordinated. Psychology considers a person to be a materialistic biological brain. Scientology considers a person to be an electronic spiritual phenomena [sic].

Hubbard proclaimed it "the hottest, fastest procurement service set up we have ever had." He announced that the new "Personal Efficiency Test Program," utilising the OCA, would be rolled out across Scientology in the next few months. Since then, OCA tests have been one of the most visible means by which the Church of Scientology attempts to attract new members.

=== Use within Scientology ===
Testing center – Brussels

The OCA is today used for two principal purposes. Within the Church of Scientology, it is used to test for improvement in the personality of a "preclear" (a Scientologist who is getting auditing) and the effectiveness of the chosen Scientology "process". OCA evaluations are conducted regularly and recorded, following Hubbard's instructions:

The American Personality Analysis or the Oxford Capacity Analysis should always be given before processing or training has begun and after that processing or training has been completed. In the case of preclears, they should, if taking several weeks of processing, be tested at the end of every twenty-five hours.

— L. Ron Hubbard, Dianetics Today, 1975

The other use, more visible to non-Scientologists, is that of recruitment, using the OCA as a tool to attract new people for Scientology services. In a 1960 policy letter, Hubbard wrote:

For some time Orgs have used testing as a promotional means. It has been found that this is a good, reliable method of getting people to come in. The essence of testing procedure is (a) to get the person to do a test and (b) get him or her to come in to have it evaluated. From this follows his or her getting processing and training as sold to the person by PrR [Promotion & Registration] at the same time as the evaluation is done.

— L. Ron Hubbard, "New Testing Promotion Section", HCO Policy Letter, 1960

The results of the test are invariably negative, as various reporters have found:

With a serious expression, another woman called Emily – a long haired, pretty 20-something – took me into a booth and with a deadpan voice told me it was 'well, not very good.'

Apparently, I was depressed, unstable, overly-critical, argumentative and withdrawn.

The computer print-out said I needed 'urgent attention.'

A university student who visited the HASI [Hubbard Association of Scientologists International] [...] was told that, though he had a high IQ and was a genius and could do anything he wanted to, his character, as the graph showed, was defective, that he was mentally unstable and that he was going to have a mental breakdown in eighteen months' time unless he had Scientology help, and it was also suggested to him that he had homosexual tendencies.

Former Scientologists have spoken of how everything that is ostensibly defective in a person is purposefully emphasized in OCA test results. Individuals who have undertaken the OCA have described how they were given just such negative evaluations; as one young Sydney woman put it in an interview in 1980:

After they had graphed the results of my test, this lady came up to me and said: "Well, I don't want to [...] it's not a personal comment on you, you understand, we are not personally trying to put you down, but this is your graph,' and it was just scraping along the bottom, way below normal.

Then another lady came and talked to me about doing a course with them, because though I had an abysmal personality, they could fix it, they could scrape me up from the bottom.

She hit on a few nerves that were really sensitive at the time – I'd split with my boyfriend, I'd only just moved into a place of my own, I didn't have a job, I didn't have any money and I was feeling really lonely and insecure.

— "Scientology: cash for 'communication' help", Sydney Morning Herald, 1980

Hubbard advised that the hopelessness of the testee's predicament (or "ruin," as he put it) should be emphasized by the tester, who should continually state that Scientology services are what is necessary for the situation to be salvaged:

Remarks that "Scientology can improve this or that characteristic" or "auditing can remedy that" or "Processing can change this" or "Training can stabilize that" should be used repeatedly during the evaluation for the sake of impingement.

A clever evaluator can surmise such things as domestic grief, trouble with possessions, etc much more easily than a fortune teller.

Test evaluation is modern, scientific fortune telling. It deals with past, present and future. A low profile, low IQ future is of course a dreary one, profitless, unless changed. We can erase the fate of the past and alter utterly anyone's future. So it does not matter how hard one leans on the person.

The evaluator generally follows a script (pre-written answers based on the test taker's score) originally devised by South African Scientologist Peter Greene around 1960/1961, which Hubbard instructs "must be studied and learned by heart" by evaluators. Although the analysis is represented as being "not our opinion of you, but [...] a factual scientific analysis taken from your answers," it relies heavily on scripted responses set out in detail in the "OCA Automatic Evaluation Script".

The evaluator is instructed to recommend Scientology as the only viable remedy for such problems. Alternatives are to be mentioned – "psychology, psychoanalysis, Dale Carnegie, Confidence Courses, Mental Exercises" – but only for the purpose of dismissing them: "these things had a very limited application and you could get yourself terribly involved in mysteries, expenses and wasted time, before you found any solutions to your difficulties. All across the world today, people are coming to us, to find simpler, more straight forward answers."

The idea is to impinge on the person. The more resistive or argumentative he is, the more the points should be slammed home. Look him straight in the eye and let him know, 'That is the way it is.' Proceed with evaluation on the low points, column by column. Make a decisive statement about each. If the subject agrees – says, 'That's right', or 'That describes me all right', or similar – leave it immediately. You have impinged. If he argues or protests, don't insist. You simply are not talking on his reality level. Re-phrase your statement until it is real to him. Stop as soon as you get through. As soon as you get an impingement, look subject in the face and say, with intention, 'Scientology can help you with that' or 'That can be changed with Scientology', or some similar positive statement."

The vehemence with which OCA test evaluators attempt to "impinge" has attracted comment from non-Scientologists who have undergone the test. Writing in 1970, a British psychologist who underwent the test noted that:

The staff member who had scored the inventory expounded the extreme scores with some urgency. He avoided questions on the meaning of the scales, dismissing as irrelevant the trait words at top and bottom; yet he invested the points on the scale with immense importance, almost of a charismatic nature.

If an IQ test is added to the regular OCA examination, Scientology is likewise promoted as being essential no matter what the results – for everything from raising a low IQ to managing a high IQ. Hubbard provides four levels of grading for this test, for each of which there is a scripted response:

Now, Mr, (Mrs, Miss,) let us have a look at your tests.' Open folder. 'Your I.Q. Score was ----' a) less than 100

'This is very low. Less than average and you obviously have great difficulty solving problems. Scientology training would raise that considerably.'

b) 100–110

'A very ordinary score and you have more difficulty than you need in handling problems. Scientology training would raise that considerably.'

c) 110–120

'An above average score. You can take advantage of opportunity and when you apply yourself, you progress fast. However, a high intelligence is only useful so long as you have data to apply the intelligence to. Scientology will not only give you useful data, but can raise your I.Q. even higher.'

d) Above 120

Ditto.

=== Use outside Scientology ===
The OCA is licensed to Scientologist-owned companies through the World Institute of Scientology Enterprises. It has been used for a variety of purposes, most commonly employee screening.

Some Scientologist doctors use the test to evaluate patients. US plastic surgeon Edward Terino rates his patients on a "Trouble Scale" after administering the test, which he markets to doctors via a company called Surgeon's Insight. Terino, a Scientologist, adopted the test after being threatened with injuries by a husband who hated Terino's nose-job work.

It has often been used without alteration, but has also been issued in modified versions; for instance, MasterTech markets the OCA with minor changes and calls it the Personnel Potential Analysis Test.

== Criticism and controversy ==
Psychologists have assailed the test's lack of scientific basis. Other critics call it intentionally manipulative and humiliating.

"The overall impression one gets [from the test manual]," said a psychologist testifying before a public inquiry into Scientology in Victoria, Australia in the mid-1960s, "is that it has been prepared by somebody with a smattering of psychometrics rather than by someone who is really competent in the field." A more detailed investigation was undertaken in 1970 by the British Psychological Society (BPS) at the request of politician Sir John Foster. The group's conclusions:

Taking the procedure as a whole, one is forced to the conclusion that the Oxford Capacity Analysis is not a genuine personality test; certainly the results as presented bear no relation to any known methods of assessing personality or of scaling test scores.

Another detailed evaluation was carried out in 1981 by Gudmund Smith, Professor Emeritus at the Institute of Psychology of the University of Lund, Sweden. The investigation was carried out for a prosecutor in a case against a local branch of Narconon, the church's ostensible drug rehab offshoot. Smith cited numerous methodological and empirical flaws in the OCA, describing it as a "terrible mess," and concluded (in translation from the original Swedish):

The Oxford Capacity Analysis consists to a high degree of unclearly formulated, ambiguous or misleading questions. It is used as a foundation, in a non-specific way, for an individual evaluation in 11 dimensions, partly incoherent or openly judgmental, as a whole diffuse. In view of the weaknesses also characterizing serious instruments of this type, this instrument must be regarded as completely unreliable.

The OCA also came under scrutiny in Queensland, Australia in 1990, when it emerged that scores of people had lost their jobs after a Brisbane-based personnel management company had given them poor OCA evaluations, "us[ing] such brutal terms they can read like character assassinations, leaving employers with little choice but to fire staff." The Australian Psychological Society denounced the OCA as "downright dangerous," commenting that

We've had a look at their tests and if you didn't know better, they look credible [...] These tests are saying people are acceptable or unacceptable, but really there's nothing in them to allow you to draw that kind of conclusion. It's the interpretations that are bogus – they are drawing arbitrary conclusions that simply aren't warranted.

The Church of Scientology has reportedly been unable to produce information to substantiate the validity of the Oxford Capacity Analysis. This has attracted criticism from the Buros Institute of Mental Measurements in Lincoln, Nebraska, US, which produces the Mental Measurements Yearbook, a recognised reference for psychological tests. According to the institute, "Any group should include information that substantiates the use of its test. If they can't, then it doesn't meet the standards for educational and psychological tests."

The OCA evaluators' criticism of their test subjects' personalities has also drawn sharp criticism. A London Evening Standard reporter described the unease she felt after she had taken the OCA test:

Later, as I sat on the Tube thinking about this small taste of Scientology, I was able to brush it off. Maybe Nicole Kidman has done, or is doing, something vaguely similar. In truth, though, while I sat in that office and listened to a total stranger utterly trash my personality and character – on the basis of no evidence at all – I began to feel vaguely insecure. Paranoid even. The Church of Scientology claims to help people attain a deeper, richer existence – but it clearly does so by erasing all sense of self-respect first.

Psychologists have echoed this critique. The methodological flaws of the OCA were such that, in the view of Professor Gudmund Smith, "Analysis for evaluation of an individual is, in my opinion, manifestly unethical." Testifying in a court case in Ireland in 2003, Declan Fitzgerald of University College Dublin said he believed that the OCA "impinged on people's self-esteem and was highly manipulative." In its 1970 report, the British Psychological Society's working party was even harsher with its criticism, declaring that:

No reputable psychologist would accept the procedure of pulling people off the street with a leaflet, giving them a 'personality test' and reporting back in terms that show the people to be 'inadequate,' 'unacceptable' or in need of 'urgent' attention. In a clinical setting a therapist would only discuss a patient's inadequacies with him with the greatest of circumspection and support, and even then only after sufficient contact for the therapist–patient relationship to have been built up. To report back a man's inadequacies to him in an automatic, impersonal fashion is unthinkable in responsible professional practice. To do so is potentially harmful. It is especially likely to be harmful to the nervous introspective people who would be attracted by the leaflet in the first place. The prime aim of the procedure seems to be to convince these people of their need for the corrective courses run by the Scientology organisations.

The name of the Oxford Capacity Analysis has also been criticized as misleading. The Times comments that the test "has nothing to do with Oxford University" and says that "Scientologists use the word 'Oxford' to give it credence."

== See also ==
- E-meter
- Kaja Bordevich Ballo
