= Norwegian Society for the Conservation of Nature =

Norges Naturvernforbund
- Type: NGO
- Industry: Environmental organisation
- Founded: 1914
- Headquarters: Oslo, Norway
- Area served: Norway
- Number of employees: 28 (2018)
- Website: https://naturvernforbundet.no/?lang=en_GB

The Norwegian Society for the Conservation of Nature (Norwegian: Norges Naturvernforbund, NNV), also known as Friends of the Earth Norway, is one of the largest Norwegian environmental organisations with approximately 43,000 members. The organisation is based on a volunteer work among the members, constituting work both at local and national levels. Norges Naturvernforbund works within a large range of environmental areas. The organisation is affiliated with Friends of the Earth, and member of INFORSE-Europe.

== History ==
The society dates back to 1914 as the National Association for Natural Conservation (Landsforeningen for Naturfredning). In 1916 the association started its work after three regional chapters had been founded, and the first Chairman was Hjalmar Broch. The society changed its name in 1936 to the Landsforeningen for Naturfredning i Norge, and again in 1951 to Landsforbundet for naturvern i Norge. Its current name is from 1962. The first issue of the membership magazine Norsk Natur was published in 1965 and two years later Nature and Youth (Natur og Ungdom) was founded as the youth branch.
International activities include an educational project in 16 countries on sustainable energy and practical energy saving measures SPARE, which is also part of the INFORSE-Europe cooperation school activities. The SPARE activities started in eastern European countries in 1996-99, and became introduced in the previous Soviet Union countries since 2005, where it is spread in 7000 schools (2008).

Friends of the Earth

The Norwegian Society for the Conservation of Nature is part of the 30 national organisations that constitute Friends of the Earth Europe.

== Organisation ==
The organisation has 15 county branches and 114 local groups throughout the country. In addition it has the youth branch Nature and Youth (Natur og Ungdom) and the children's branch Eco-detectives (Miljøagentene).

Their head office is located in Oslo. In total the environmental organisation has about 28 employees, some working in county offices throughout the country. Norges Naturvernforbund publishes the magazine Natur & miljø, and previously published the news bulletin Miljøjournalen.

The main policy areas for the organisation are climate change and nature conservation. Also, the organisation is concerned with preserving coastal nature habitats and increasing energy efficiency in buildings.

The organisation has a large foreign NGO branch, which mainly runs projects on energy saving and environmental education. Most of these projects are located in Central and Eastern Europe, Central Asia, and West Africa.

The organisation has formed a climate delegation which helps the organisation to work with climate policies.

=== Leadership ===
The highest leadership events of the organisation are its biennial meetings. Between these the organisation is guided by:

- a 6-member Central board, consisting since 2025 of Truls Gulowsen, Pernille Hansen, Helene Ødven, Kjell Derås, Øyunn Hasvik and Mattis Danielsen.
- a 23-member National board: consisting of the county chairpersons and representatives from subordinate organisations and employees.

The youth branch Natur og Ungdom is also represented on the Central board with their leader.

Truls Gulowsen has been the organisation's leader since 2021, and Gro Holstad has been CEO since 2022.

== See also ==
- Environmental organisations based in Norway
- Friends of the Earth topics
