= 2019 Alta helicopter crash =

Helicopter crash in Norway

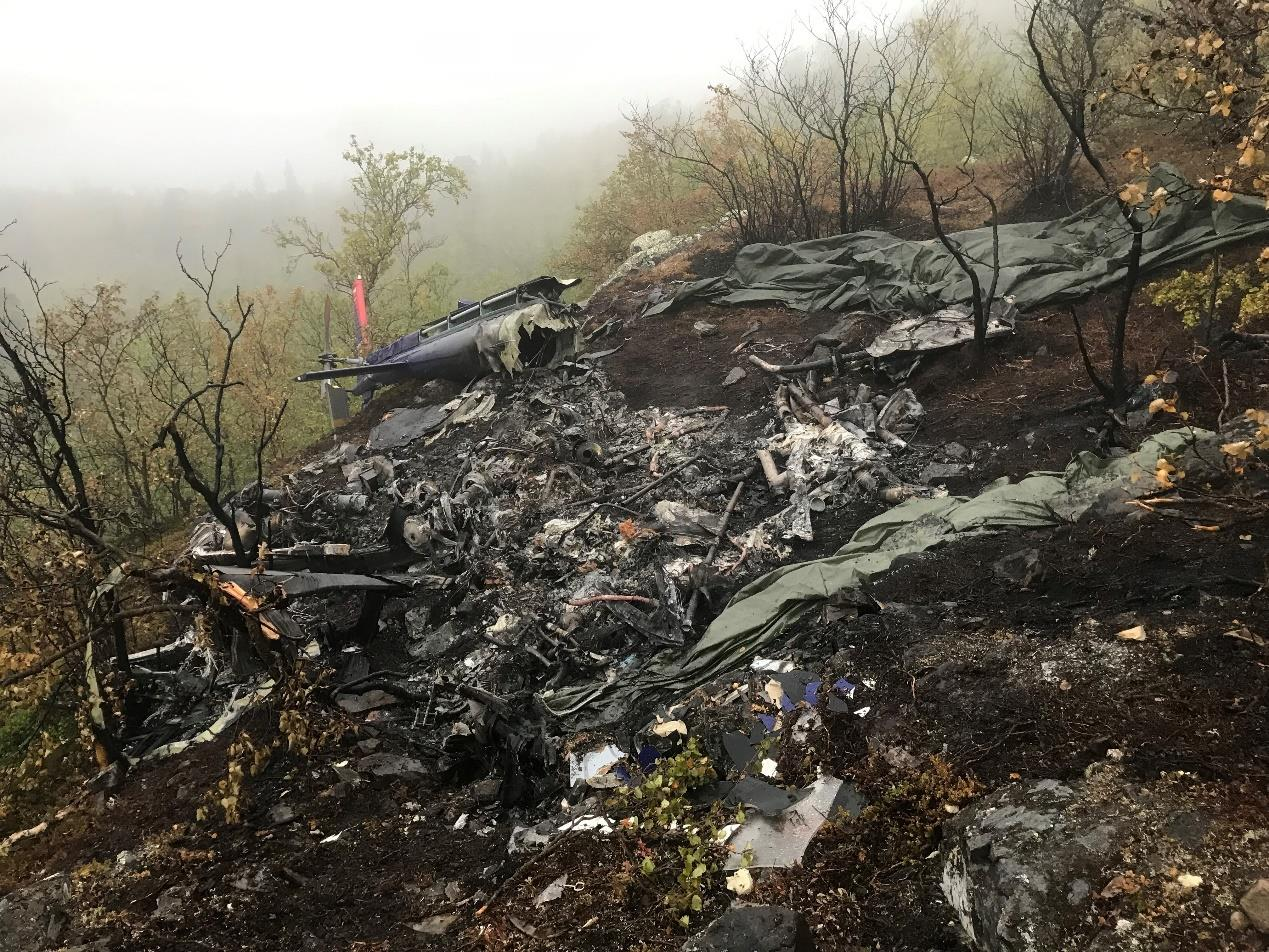
- LN‑OFU wreck at crash site at Skoddevarre

Accident
- Date: 31 August 2019
- Summary: Loss of control after helicopter entered servo transparency
- Site: Skoddevarre, Alta, Norway; 69°55′06″N 23°09′18″E

Aircraft
- Aircraft type: Airbus AS350
- Operator: Helitrans
- Registration: LN‑OFU
- Occupants: 6
- Passengers: 5
- Crew: 1
- Fatalities: 6
- Survivors: 0

On 31 August 2019, an Airbus AS350 helicopter operated by a contracted Helitrans pilot from Sweden crashed in the mountains of Skoddevarre in Alta Municipality in Finnmark county, Norway. The crash happened during a sightseeing tour, killing all six people on board. The tour was offered by a local music festival, Høstsprell, who had been providing the service for seven years. The helicopter, registered as LN‑OFU, had recently been delivered and had undergone security checks hours before takeoff.

An investigation by the Norwegian Safety Investigation Authority (NSIA) found no technical faults with the machinery, and concluded that LN‑OFU had entered servo transparency; the stresses on the rotors had exceeded the hydraulic servomotor's capacity, causing the controls to lock up. This was caused by the helicopter's heavy load and rapid fluctuations in velocity and height. The pilot tried to regain control, but was ultimately unable to do so and crashed into the terrain. As the aircraft did not have a crash-resistant fuel system (CRFS), the wreck promptly caught fire, destroying most of it and inflicting lethal burns to the people on board; autopsies of the victims' bodies suggested that they died from their burns. The NSIA consequently called for the ban of commercial flights on rotorcraft without CRFSs in the European Union. Airworthiness certificates in the European Union were amended in 2024 to require CRFSs on helicopters.

Helitrans received criticism for allowing an inexperienced pilot to fly with passengers, and for not having CRFSs installed on their helicopters. After the incident, they started replacing their fleet of aircraft with new ones installed with CRFSs. Both Høstsprell and Helitrans stopped providing sightseeing tours.

== Background ==
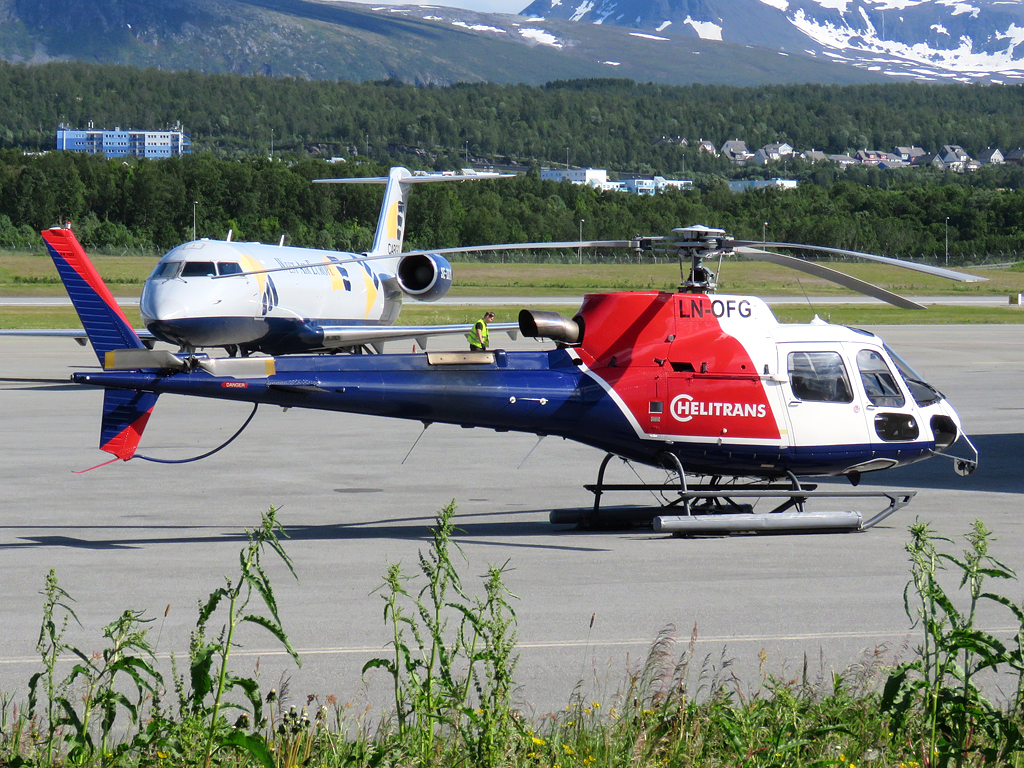
An AS350 similar to the one involved in the incident

Høstsprell, a music festival held in Kvenvik in Alta Municipality, had been arranging helicopter tours for attendees every year since 2012 for 500 kr apiece. The company operating the tours, Helitrans, rented helicopters from Skjolden Cruisekai, who had acquired seven helicopters in June 2019 from Østnes Helicopters, the Norwegian representative for European aerospace manufacturer Airbus. Both Helitrans and Skjolden Cruisekai were owned in whole by Røysi Invest, an investment firm run by father-daughter pair Oddvar and Anne Line Røysi. Of their fleet of 25 helicopters, 15 were of the type Airbus AS350. Around 100 people were employed by Helitrans in 2019, one of whom was the Swedish pilot Fredrik Lindmark, who operated the flights in Kvenvik.

Fredrik Lindmark was a contract worker from Nyköping, Sweden, who lived with his partner and her son in Honningsvåg. He had worked with Helitrans as a loadmaster for two years since his first seasonal contract with them on 9 May 2017. His final contact with Helitrans was to last from 1 April to 30 November 2019. After having undergone an operator proficiency check on 26 August, he was now able to operate helicopters for them. 27 years old at the time of his death, he held a Swedish commercial flight certificate and a first-class medical certificate. He had obtained an AS350 rating from Airbus' facility in Marignane, France, in May 2018, where he scored a 96% on the knowledge test, and passed with full marks on the flight assessment. Airbus' training did not include supervised passenger flights. He underwent several successful proficiency checks, the last one performed in April 2019 by the Norwegian government. He had not undergone any training with a flight simulator. He was still in the process of gaining experience, having a combined flight time of 256 hours, 17 of which were conducted in AS350 type helicopters, and 50 hours in passenger flights. His employers at Helitrans viewed sightseeing tours as a less demanding task, therefore being fit for building the experience he lacked. Lindmark's coworkers described him as a thorough, structured, calm, and cautious individual, who was unlikely to invite danger by seeking thrills.

The helicopter operated by Lindmark, registered as LN‑OFU, was an AS350 with a flight time of 73 hours. It was ordered in September 2018 by Skjolden Cruisekai, and was delivered with an airworthiness certificate on 12 June 2019. Airbus had been working on crash-resistant fuel systems (CRFS) since 2011, which would be ready by 2014. They did not, however, make these obligatory in production until October 2019, and customers could therefore choose to leave them out. EU legislation from 2003 made it so any helicopter designs certified in or before 1994 did not require CRFSs. LN‑OFU did not have a CRFS, making it more vulnerable to catching fire in case of a crash. The installment of such a system would have cost €35.000. When questioned, CEO Oddvar Røysi denied that they left it out deliberately, noting that it was only considered "additional equipment" by the manufacturers.

== Incident ==
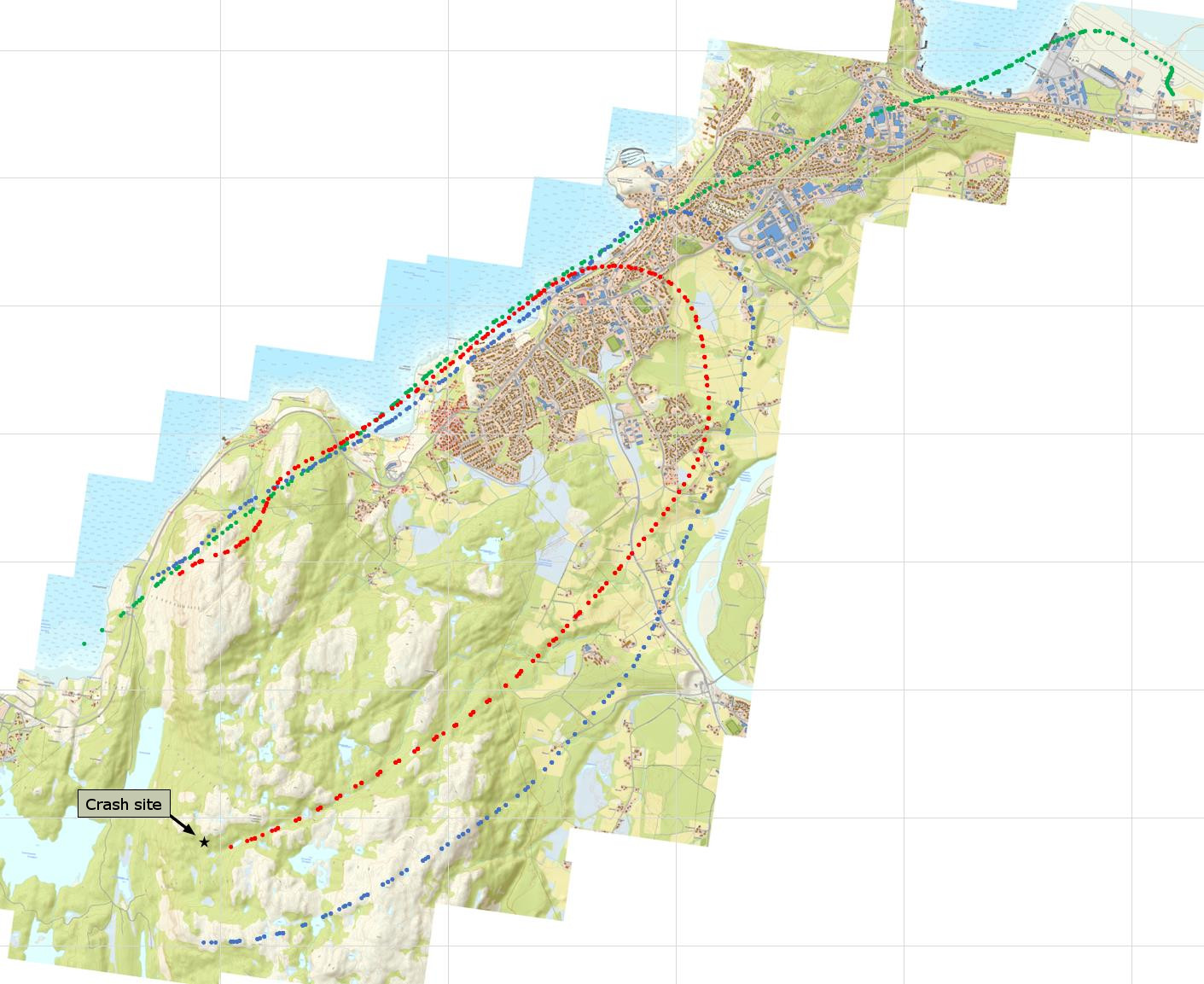
Flight data before LN‑OFU crashed, retrieved from Flightradar24

On 31 August 2019, a 100-hour inspection of LN‑OFU was performed at 13:30, with no anomalies found, except a slight oil leak from the gasket of the gearbox's input shaft. At 16:05, the pilot and the loadmaster took off from Alta Airport to the festival grounds at Kvenvik, landing seven minutes later. At 16:40, the pilot gave his first sightseeing tour of the day for attendees of that year's Høstsprell in Kvenvik, which ended without incident at 16:50. At 16:59, he took off for another tour with five passengers in clear weather conditions. During the flight, the passengers sent media over Snapchat to acquaintances as they were heading toward the mountains of Skoddevarre. At 17:05, LN‑OFU disappeared from Helitrans' GSM network, and was last recorded by Flightradar24 as being stationary at the coordinates of the crash site at 17:08. Several witnesses reported seeing and hearing the helicopter, but no witnesses reported seeing the crash itself. LN‑OFU's loadmaster was notified of smoke coming from the mountains by a bystander, after which he started observing. Initially, he did not believe it to be from the aircraft, but after he was unable to hear any helicopter sounds, he contacted Helitrans' traffic centre, the police, the Joint Rescue Coordination Centre of Northern Norway (JRCC), and air traffic control at Alta Airport.

At 17:06, the JRCC received a report of the accident after the emergency position-indicating radiobeacon of the helicopter went off. Helitrans' traffic centre last received notice of LN‑OFU at 17:08, after which they started a rescue operation. At 17:16, another civilian Bell 205 helicopter operated by Heli‑Team came across the crashed helicopter by coincidence when returning from a transport order in the east (Note: Initial reports by NRK and Finnmark Dagblad stated that the mission was in Tana Municipality, while the NSIA's 2022 report stated that it was in Banak in Porsanger Municipality.) to their base in Kvænangen Municipality. By the time they arrived, LN‑OFU had nearly burnt to a crisp. At 17:18 they started sending messages by radio, which were picked up by a Widerøe plane flying over. The crew of the plane started relaying information about the situation from Heli‑Team to the air traffic control tower at Alta Airport, including GPS-coordinates. The crew of the Heli‑Team spotted a survivor on the ground, around 50 meters (164 feet) from the crash site, after which they landed a safe distance away to try and assist him. After the loadmaster of the aircraft approached the survivor, they realised he was conscious and able to speak, but their conversation was not able to elucidate how the crash had happened. A Sea King rescue helicopter was sent from the military airbase at Banak at 17:20, and arrived at the scene of the crash at 17:50. Four of the victims were declared dead by the JRCC at 18:17, with one victim still missing, and one being treated by rescuers. The victim being treated was flown to the University Hospital of North Norway, where they died overnight. The missing person was found dead at 20:40. The entirety of the helicopter's airframe except the tail was destroyed by the fire, including all electronic devices on board, and it lit the terrain c. 50 m^{2} (538.2 ft^{2}) around it on fire.

== Investigation ==
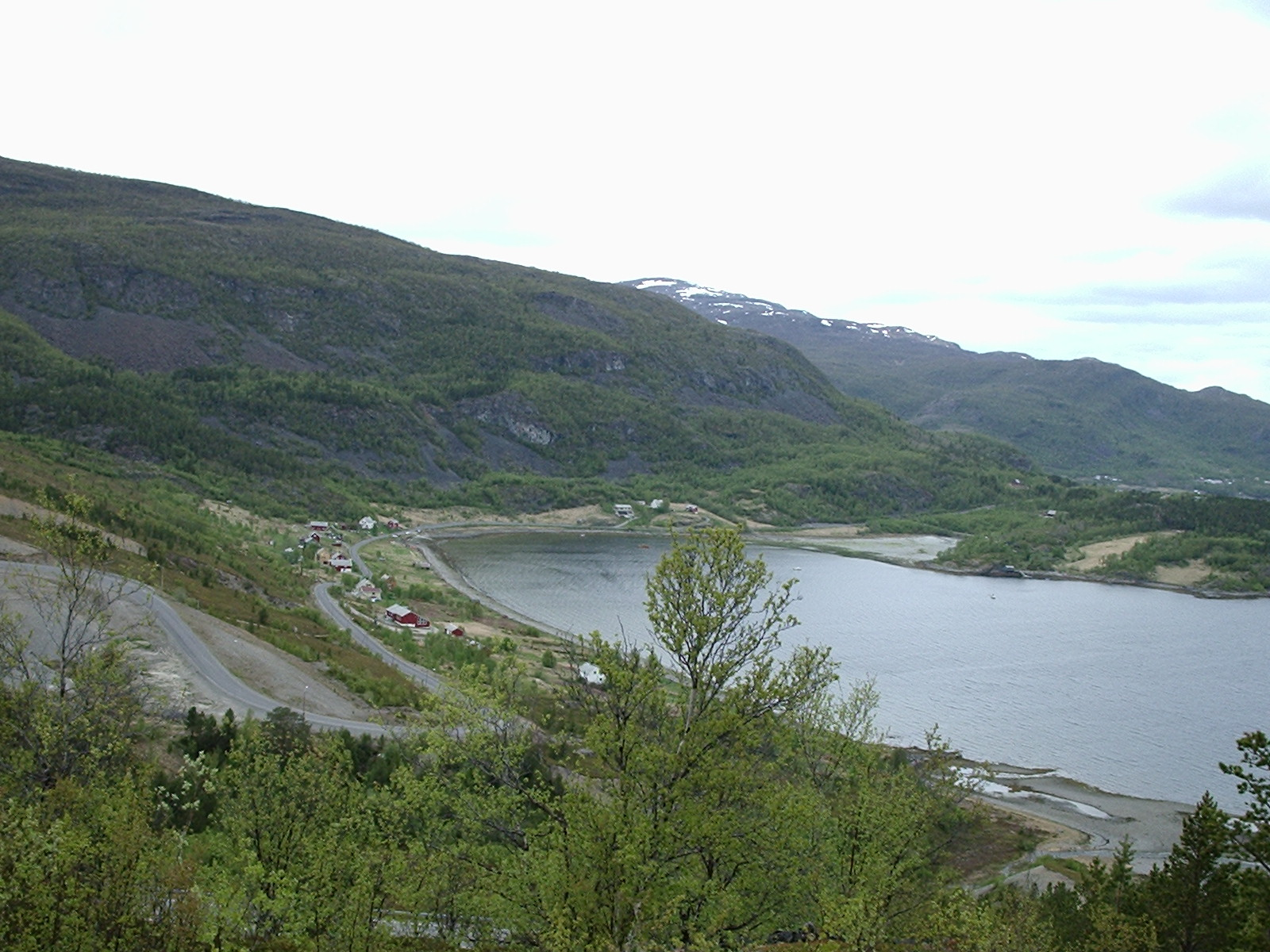
Kvenvik in Alta, Norway

Three representatives of the Norwegian Safety Investigation Authority (NSIA) (Note: The NSIA was known at the time as the Accident Investigation Board Norway (AIBN). The name was changed on 1 July 2020 when it merged with the Defense Accident Investigation Board Norway.) arrived at the crash site on 1 September to gather information. The Norwegian Civil Defence assisted in safeguarding and searching the area, and provided air transportation of personnel and equipment for police. They also provided food and shelter for the investigators at the scene. A team of Airbus technicians from France were sent to aid in investigation, in addition to the French Bureau of Enquiry and Analysis for Civil Aviation Safety and the engine manufacturer Safran Aircraft Engines. The NSIA asked airport operator Avinor for any additional data they had from radar and the air traffic control tower in Alta. Police in Finnmark notified the public that they had introduced a restriction on entry and flight within 500 metres of the crash site on 1 September. They also asked people to refrain from spreading rumours about the situation, as they were worried about the effect it could have on witness reports. On 3 September, the NSIA started transporting the wreck to Kjeller in Southern Norway. The restrictions on travel to the area ended on 5 September.

During the NSIA's investigation at the crash site, they retrieved the flight recorder of the helicopter, but it had been destroyed by fire, making the cause of the crash difficult to identify. The flight recorder was nevertheless sent to its producers in France to try and retrieve information. They also found that five out of six bolts connecting the gearbox to the motor were missing, with only half a bolt remaining, leading investigators to hypothesise that they had been severed from one another before the crash. On 9 October, police started searching for the bolts that had gone missing in the mountains with metal detectors and magnets. Two days later, police reported that they had found several, but did not specify whether they came from the helicopter. Out of a total of eleven missing bolts, ten were eventually found.

After preliminary investigations at the crash site, Airbus released an emergency alert service bulletin on 11 September, asking for immediate inspection of any new AS350, AS550, and EC130 helicopters. Helitrans found no anomalies in their other aircraft, and the director of communications at the Civil Aviation Authority of Norway stated that they had found no anomalies in any Norwegian companies that operated these helicopter types.

Media sent by the passengers through Snapchat, one captured half a minute before the crash, were initially analysed by the police, but were ultimately not useful in identifying any problems with the helicopter. One video, taken seconds before the crash, was however identified as important by the police, as they believed it could contain information not found in the others. The police were not able to acquire a warrant to recover the video from Snapchat's servers in the United States, as the video did not contain evidence of a criminal offence.

=== NSIA report ===
In March 2022, the NSIA released a report on the incident. Early drafts of the report had been given out to affected parties such as the manufacturers after quality insurance of translations. They concluded that the most likely cause of the crash was a servo transparency, a phenomenon that occurs when stress on the rotor exceeds the capacity of the hydraulic servomotor, causing flight controls to stiffen and become harder to handle. Such stress can be caused by a combination of factors, including high speeds, mass and density altitude. The report attributed 11 prior accidents with AS350s to servo transparency.

In their report, the NSIA estimated that LN‑OFU had an excessive amount of fuel on board, which induced high stress on the main rotor. The flight data in their report also revealed that the aircraft had experienced great variations in velocities and heights, the latter of which was below the legal limit of at least 500 ft (152.4 m) above the terrain. The aircraft's pitch was recorded to be pointing 30° downward, which was outside the limit of 15° that Helitrans had set due to safety recommendations from the NSIA following the 2011 Dalamot helicopter crash. They therefore concluded that the pilot's inexperience led him to eschew these safety standards during the flight; an earlier passenger noted that the pilot promised to fly low to the ground to give a sense of speed during the flight, which was corroborated by the report's flight-tracking data.

The pilot of a helicopter undergoing servo transparency can try to regain control by lowering the collective pitch, therefore reducing the stress on the rotor. This will in turn increase the helicopter's sink rate, bringing it closer to the ground. The NSIA's report stated that their evaluation of the wreck and crash site indicated the pilot had nearly regained control, but did not have enough height to avoid crashing into the terrain. There was no evidence to suggest that he had a debilitating clinical condition, weakened sense of awareness or judgement, or any other health problems during his flight. The distribution of the wreckage led the NSIA to suggest that the crash was a "low energy impact", and stated that the chance of survival for the victims would have been higher if the aircraft hadn't caught fire, a consequence of it lacking a CRFS. They therefore recommended that helicopters not fly any passengers without being equipped with a CRFS.

== Victims ==
The five passengers that died in the crash were locals from Alta. They were between the ages of 19 and 22. Two of the victims, Kevin Berg and Kine Johnsen, were cousins and close relatives of local politician Ronny Berg, who had previously served as State Secretary of Ministry of Trade, Industry and Fisheries from 2015 to 2017 in Solberg's Cabinet. Their bodies were transported from the crash site the following evening. They were not immediately identifiable, as the wreck had started burning after the crash, so the police service Kripos were asked for help in identifying their bodies. The family of Berg were asked to take DNA tests to positively identify him. The identities of four of the passengers were released on 1 September by the police, with the names of the other two being withheld due to their families wishes. The identity of the last passenger was released by police the following day. The bodies were transported to Tromsø on 2 September by helicopter to be autopsied and identified. The autopsies revealed that the likely cause of death for all on board was damage caused by the fire.

On 5 September, the victims from Alta were escorted back home by police in separate hearses. People across Troms and Finnmark chose to stand by the roadside of the E6 motorway when the cortege was driving to Alta to pay their respects. On the final stretch, the entourage was followed by hundreds of cars, and was greeted by lit candles in Talvik. Hundreds of people from Alta, including the local fire department, congregated in the town centre to welcome the hearses. The funerals of the victims from Alta were held between 10 and 13 September. Due to difficulties with getting clearance, the pilot was not transported to Sweden until 25 September. With assistance from SOS International, he was flown to Stockholm Arlanda Airport, then driven home to his family. His identity was not revealed until 3 October, when his obituary was published in Nyköping's local newspaper Södermanlands Nyheter. His funeral was held on 14 October. The expenses for the pilot's transport and funeral were covered by Helitrans' insurance.

== Reactions ==
On the day following the incident, representatives of every political party in Alta agreed to suspend their political campaigning for the local elections held that year to mourn the victims. All debates, internet campaigns, and official visits were cancelled. The political parties in the neighbouring municipalities of Karasjok, Kautokeino, Loppa, and Kvænangen soon followed suit. Campaigning in Hammerfest was not cancelled, but political parties in the municipality agreed to "tone it down" to "an absolute minimum". Following the results of the election in Alta, they suspended all negotiations until the funerals of the victims had been held. School debates and elections were also cancelled at the secondary schools in Alta and Karasjok; in Kautokeino, only the debates were stopped. The secondary school in Alta also suspended all their lessons on Monday in order to provide care for any students that may have been affected. Prime Minister Erna Solberg offered her condolences to the families of the victims and the community of Alta, in particular to Ronny Berg, who had worked in her cabinet. She also sent condolences to the people working at Helitrans.

The Northern Lights Cathedral in Alta held memorial services for the passengers on 1 September and 4 September. According to Finnmark Dagblad, the church was three fourths full during the first service. The attendees of the second service numbered in the hundreds, exceeding the capacity of the venue. Karasjok Church did the same for two of the victims whose parents and extended family were from Karasjok. Around 30 people showed up.

On 13 September, a fundraiser was started on Spleis to support the family of the pilot after a Facebook user commented on the lack of support for him compared to the passengers: "If we all give 1 kr, we could send it to Helitrans to have them order and deliver a flower from the people of Alta". The fundraiser reached 130,000 kr in less than a day, exceeding its initial goal of 30,000 kr, and reached a total of 231,100 kr by its conclusion. Helitrans stated that they would transfer the money to an account administered by them until the family had decided what to do with it. Another fundraiser was started the following day to support the families of the victims from Alta, with money to be split equally among them. It earned a total of 144,630 kr.

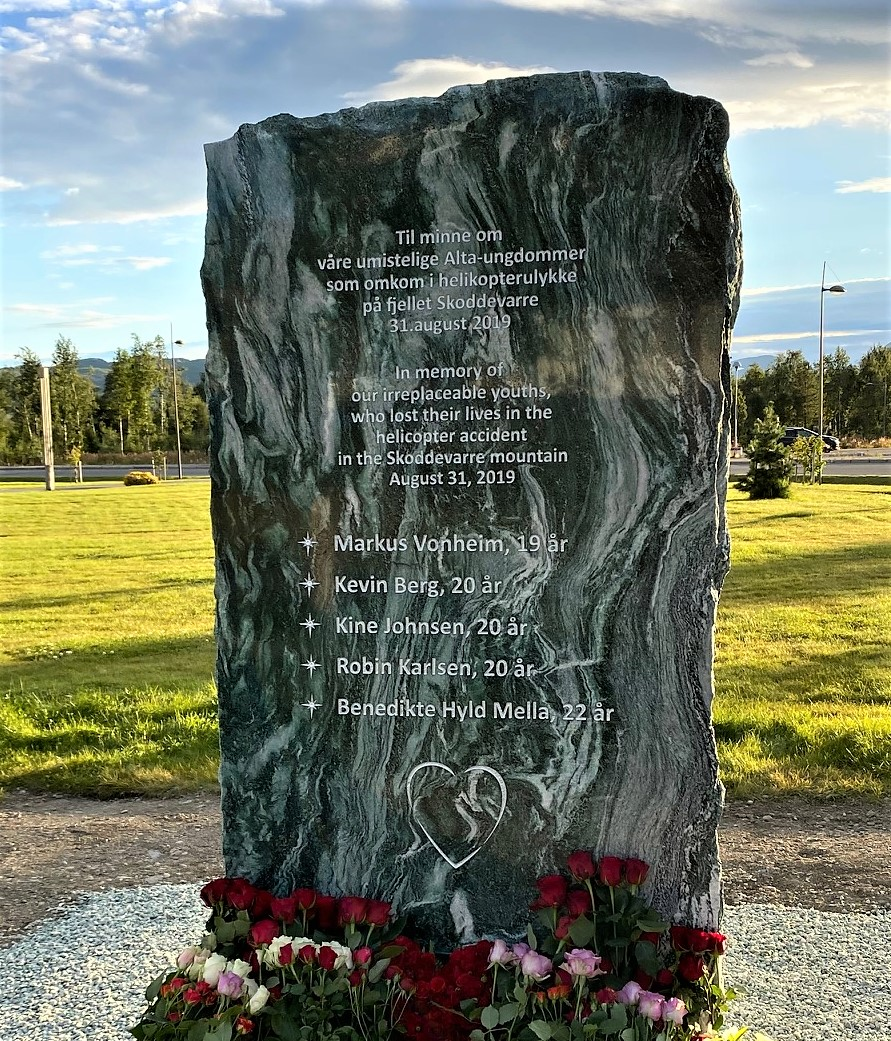
Memorial unveiled at the Northern Lights Cathedral on 31 August 2020

Several monuments were unveiled in the area on 31 August 2020, a year after the incident took place, to commemorate the victims; One was located at the Northern Lights Cathedral, which was unveiled by Alta Councillor Bjørn-atle Hansen. Its construction had been announced in June, and was funded by the municipality. Around 200 people attended the ceremony. Another memorial was made by local youth at Kvenvikmoen where a makeshift memorial was held the previous year. It was located on the grounds of a local golf club, who did not mind its presence. The last one was unveiled at Skoddevarre by Helitrans general manager Richard Simonsen, who invited the families of the victims to attend. The pilot's family could not come due to the COVID-19 pandemic. After a speech at the memorial, Simonsen laid down a wreath next to it, followed by families of the deceased laying down flowers. Helitrans also grounded all of their helicopters for an hour.

After the NSIA's report came out in March 2022, people in Alta voiced their criticism of the practice of flying sightseeing tours with passengers to build experience. The families of the victims were, according to their lawyer, also critical of Helitrans for not securing their helicopters with CRFSs.

A five-year commemoration was held in Alta on 31 August 2024. Around seventy people gathered at the event.

== Aftermath ==
Alta municipality mobilised a crisis response team at the town hall shortly after news of the accident was reported. The Regional Psychiactric Centre for Western Finnmark set up a phone number that the next-of-kin and friends of the victims could call for immediate support from emergency personnel or a crisis response team. The Municipal Medical Officer of Alta ordered local psychiatric institutions such as the Finnmark Hospital Trust to prioritise supporting the bereaved over other non-emergency cases. General practitioners were consequently ordered to always be ready to pick up phone calls, and if they were unable to, were asked to call back as quickly as possible. The local church (the Northern Lights Cathedral), youth centre, and hospital were fully staffed by doctors and nurses to provide support.

The Høstsprell festival cancelled all events, but allowed for people to gather at the premises. The general manager of Alta Event, the company behind the festival, stated they would stop providing sightseeing tours in helicopters. Helitrans grounded their fleet of helicopters following the incident; the helicopters were back in service on 11 September. On 2 September 2020, Helitrans general manager Richard Simonsen stated that they would no longer provide sightseeing tours out of respect for the victims. By September 2021, Helitrans had invested in two new flight simulators to "promote a culture of safety" and enhance the safety standards of their pilots. They also invited other companies to assist in building a competency centre to raise safety standards in the industry.

Airbus made crash-resistant fuel systems part of the standard equipment on every new AS350 on 1 October 2019, and strongly suggested that operators retrofit their old helicopters with the new systems. An AS350 flight simulator facility was opened in Vantaa, Finland, by flight training company Coptersafety on 17 October, with the highest level of certification from the European Union Aviation Safety Agency (EASA).

In March 2022, the NSIA requested a ban on commercial flights of helicopters without CRFSs within the European Union, noting that the occupants could have "probably survived" if a fire had not broken out immediately after. In light of the NSIA's report, Helitrans stated that they had replaced 60% of their old fleet with new helicopters installed with a CRFS; they did not view retrofitting their old rotorcraft with the system as cost-effective. In November 2022, the EASA released a Notice of Proposed Amendment to mandate the installation of CRFSs onto old helicopter designs still in production, and the retrofitting of existing aircraft with such systems. They asked for opinions from interested parties to be sent to the European Commission by 2023, who decide the requirements for earning airworthiness certificates. In 2024, airworthiness certificates in the EU were amended to mandate CRFSs on helicopters.

=== Lawsuits ===
Hours after the crash took place, the Troms and Finnmark Public Prosecution Office ordered the police in Finnmark to investigate Helitrans in regards to their pilot licencing and certificates, among other things. On 22 July 2022, the public prosecutor decided to drop the case against the pilot because of his death, and the case against Helitrans due to the lack of evidence. Police attorney Hanne Bernhardsen stated that the accident had been thoroughly investigated by police. A lawyer representing four of the families did not want to comment on any potential appeal against the ruling.

On 4 September 2019, days after the crash had occurred, the newly established consulting firm Helicopter Solutions sent e-mails to various lawyers in Alta, claiming that they would assist in any potential lawsuits against Helitrans as "independent specialists providing testimony on helicopter operations and technical maintenance". In their correspondences, they used preliminary information about the crash to assign fault to Helitrans and the pilot, noting that the company had previously been implicated in deadly crashes. Three of the lawyers contacted by the firm condemned their proposition as speculative and distasteful, saying that it was too early to draw conclusions. Helitrans general manager Richard Simonsen called it untimely and tasteless. Helicopter Solutions did not return any requests for comment from Altaposten or Finnmark Dagblad.
