= Friends of Israel in the Parliament of Norway =

Friends of Israel in the Parliament of Norway (Norwegian: Israels Venner på Stortinget) is a pro-Israel caucus group consisting of members of the Parliament of Norway.

== History ==
In 1974, the group constituted a majority in the Parliament of Norway for the first time, with 86 members among the 150 parliamentary representatives. All political parties except for the Socialist Electoral League were represented. In 1981 the group had 100 members, but this number declined following the Israeli invasion of Lebanon in 1982.

In the 2005, the group had 28 members from three political parties; 16 from the Progress Party (FrP), 10 from the Christian Democratic Party (KrF) and 2 from the Conservative Party (H). One member, KrF's Jon Lilletun, died during the term. In comparison, the number of seats in parliament for each party was 38 from the Progress Party, 11 from the Christian Democratic Party and 23 from the Conservative Party. The group was chaired by Ingebrigt S. Sørfonn of the Christian Democratic Party.

In late 2007, an initiative was taken to form an opposing parliamentary group, Friends of Palestine in the Parliament of Norway, in support of Palestinians.

After the 2009 election, the groups supporting Israel and Palestine reconvened. Torbjørn Røe Isaksen (H) joined both groups. In late November 2009 the group had 26 members; 13 from the Progress Party (FrP), 10 from the Christian Democratic Party (KrF) and 3 from the Conservative Party (H). In comparison, the number of seats in parliament for each party was 41 from the Progress Party, 10 from the Christian Democratic Party and 30 from the Conservative Party. The members elected Hans Olav Syversen as leader from 2009 to 2011, and Jørund Rytman as leader from 2011 to 2013.

== Present members (2013–2017) ==
As of June 2014, the Friends of Israel have a total of 37 members, 20 (of 29) from the Progress Party (FrP), 10 (of 10) from the Christian Democratic Party (KrF), 4 (of 48) from the Conservative Party (H), and 3 (of 55) from the Labour Party (Ap). Hans Fredrik Grøvan (KrF) chaired the caucus the first two years, and Jørund Rytman (FrP) the final two years.

- Harald T. Nesvik (FrP)
- Ingebjørg Godskesen (FrP)
- Jan-Henrik Fredriksen (FrP)
- Jørund Rytman (FrP)
- Sivert Bjørnstad (FrP)
- Kenneth Svendsen (FrP)
- Morten Ørsal Johansen (FrP)
- Christian Tybring-Gjedde (FrP)
- Tor André Johnsen (FrP)
- Per Sandberg (FrP)
- Erlend Wiborg (FrP)
- Oskar Grimstad (FrP)
- Bente Thorsen (FrP)
- Kristian Norheim (FrP)
- Ulf Leirstein (FrP)
- Mazyar Keshvari (FrP)
- Morten Wold (FrP)
- Morten Stordalen (FrP)
- Tom E. B. Holthe (FrP)
- Helge Thorheim (FrP)
- Himanshu Gulati (FrP)
- Kjell Ingolf Ropstad (KrF)
- Olaug Bollestad (KrF)
- Knut Arild Hareide (KrF)
- Hans Fredrik Grøvan (KrF)
- Rigmor Andersen Eide (KrF)
- Hans Olav Syversen (KrF)
- Line Henriette Hjemdal (KrF)
- Geir Jørgen Bekkevold (KrF)
- Geir Toskedal (KrF)
- Anders Tyvand (KrF)
- Siri A. Meling (H)
- Ingjerd Schou (H)
- Øyvind Halleraker (H)
- Frank Jenssen (H)
- Kari Henriksen (Ap)
- Sverre Myrli (Ap)
- Kåre Simensen (Ap)

Two members, Kari Henriksen and Sverre Myrli (both Ap) were also members of Friends of Palestine.
