= Ronny Berg =

Norwegian politician

Ronny Berg (born 16 April 1970) is a Norwegian politician for the Progress Party.

He served as a deputy representative to the Parliament of Norway from Finnmark during the term 2013–2017. In total he met during 7 days of parliamentary session. From 2015 to 2017 he served in Solberg's Cabinet as a State Secretary in the Ministry of Trade, Industry and Fisheries. He was also the deputy mayor of Alta Municipality.

On 31 August 2019, two of Berg's relatives, those being his son Kevin Berg, and his niece Kine Johnsen, died in a helicopter crash in the mountains of Skoddevarre in Alta Municipality. In 2022, he criticised the operator Helitrans' practice of letting pilots gain experience with sightseeing tours.
