= Friends of Estonia in the Parliament of Norway =

Pro-Estonia caucus group in Norway

Friends of Estonia in the Parliament of Norway (Norwegian: Estlands Venner på Stortinget) is a pro-Estonia caucus group consisting of Members of the Parliament of Norway.

The Friends of Estonia in the Parliament of Norway was founded in November 2009, largely by the initiative of Progress Party politician Jørund Rytman. At the founding meeting of the group, more than twenty Members of Parliament joined in. Although Rytman found many good things about the country, the market liberal economic policies were cited as one of the most appreciated policies. Rytman also cited the country's low taxes, highly ranked internet and computer services and coverage, an all-around ID-card used for many public and private services, and a reduction of bureaucracy, with "100 percent" of the public sector being on the internet.

The group had 22 members as of July 2010, from the Progress Party (FrP), Conservative Party (H), Christian Democratic Party (KrF) and Labour Party (AP). They were:

- Jørund Rytman (FrP)
- Ulf Leirstein (FrP)
- Morten Høglund (FrP)
- Karin S. Woldseth (FrP)
- Per Roar Bredvold (FrP)
- Øyvind Vaksdal (FrP)
- Henning Skumsvoll (FrP)
- Morten Ørsal Johansen (FrP)
- Laila Reiertsen (FrP)
- Ingebjørg Godskesen (FrP)
- Kenneth Svendsen (FrP)
- Torgeir Trældal (FrP)
- Christian Tybring-Gjedde (FrP)
- Gjermund Hagesæter (FrP)
- Svein Flåtten (H)
- Peter S. Gitmark (H)
- Ingjerd Schou (H)
- Geir Bekkevold (KrF)
- Rigmor Andersen Eide (KrF)
- Hans Olav Syversen (KrF)
- Sverre Myrli (AP)
- Laila Gustavsen (AP)
