= Servo transparency =

Hazardous aero-mechanical phenomenon in helicopters

In aviation, and in particular in helicopters, servo transparency (also called servo reversibility or jack stall), is a phenomenon affecting the servomechanisms (or servos) that assist a helicopter's flight controls, which, in certain flight conditions, can result in a significant stiffening of the controls handled by the pilot. The effect, if not promptly recognised by the pilot, can be hazardous as it can lead to partial or total loss of control, which, if encountered at low altitude, could result in impact with terrain.

== Background ==
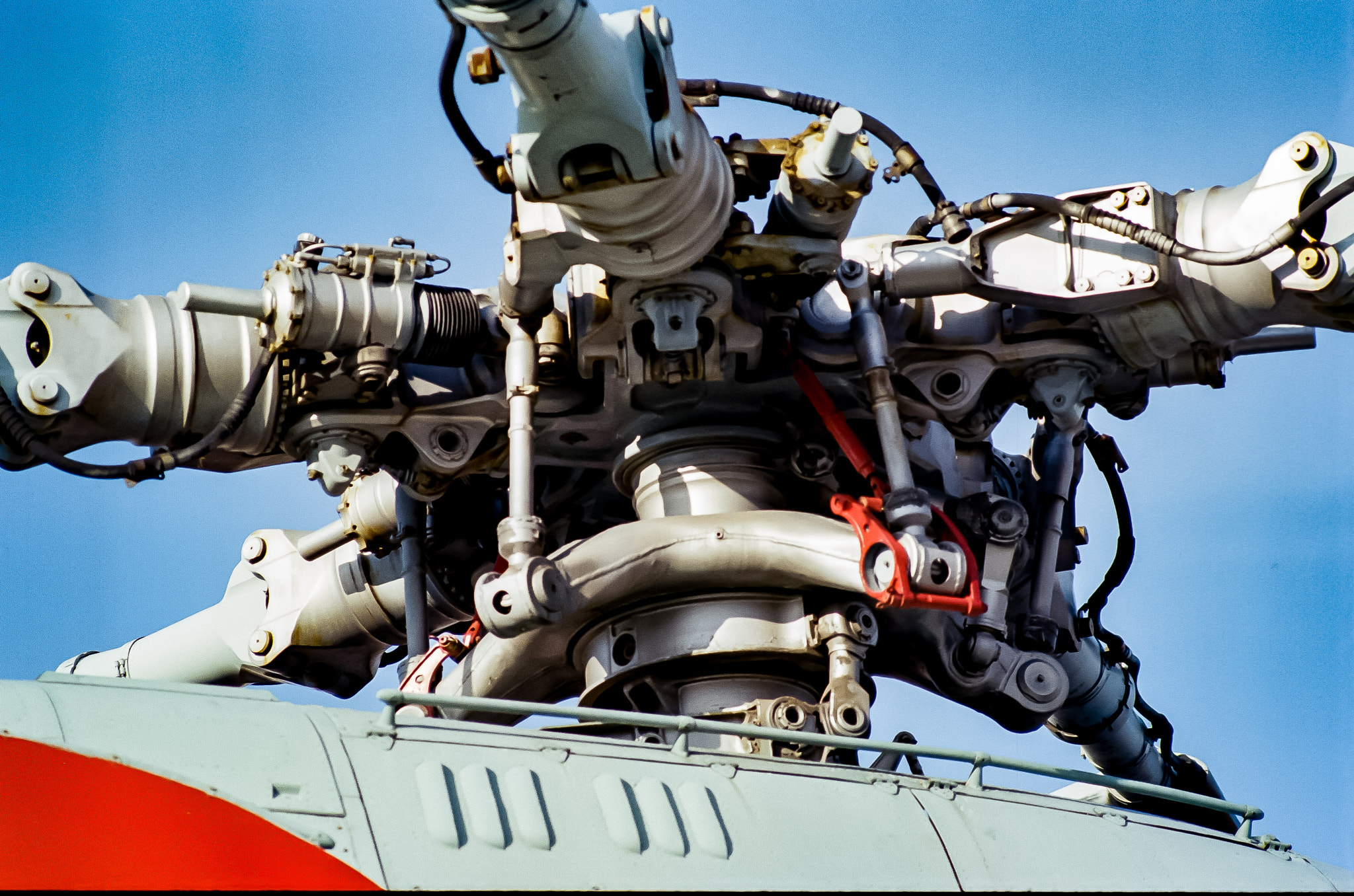
A helicopter's main rotor hub. The vertical rods are at the end of the control chain that starts with the pilot controls.

Helicopter flight controls are connected to the main and tail rotors, and include a cyclic stick, broadly to control forward-aft and left-right movements, a collective lever, broadly to control vertical movements, and anti-torque pedals, to control left and right yaw. The forces applied to such controls by the pilot are opposed by aerodynamic forces acting on the rotors, and in all but the lightest helicopter types (such as the two-seater Robinson R22), they are too big for a human alone to handle. Therefore, most helicopters are fitted with servo systems that aid the control effort and effectively isolate the controls from the aerodynamic forces acting on the rotors. The concept is similar to that of power steering in automotive technology.

== Phenomenon ==
The servomechanisms employed on helicopters are typically hydraulic actuators. The maximum force that such servos can impart is set, and depends primarily on the design service pressure delivered by the aircraft's hydraulic system. Within the approved flight envelope (that is in ordinary flight conditions), the aerodynamic forces acting on the rotor generally remain within the servos' ability to oppose them, but in certain conditions, for example during aggressive manoeuvring, such aerodynamic forces can exceed the maximum force that the servos can exert. When that happens, the excess force is transmitted unabated down the control chain and to the cyclic and collective levers, giving the pilot the impression that the controls are either moving of their own accord or are jammed. The servos have become 'transparent', in that, relatively to the excess force, it is as if they were absent.

=== Onset and recovery ===
During forward flight, the pitch angle – and therefore the angle of attack – of the rotor blades is increased while blades are retreating (that is moving backwards) and decreased while they are advancing; this is to compensate for the variation of the blades' speed relative to the air, with the aim of maintaining the rotor's lift distribution as uniform as possible. A higher angle of attack on the retreating blades results in a higher load on the servos, and on helicopters with the main rotor turning clockwise, when seen from above, this means that the blades on the right-hand side of the helicopter are generally more heavily loaded than the ones on the left.

Therefore, on clockwise-turning rotors, the right servo will reach its maximum design load first, and if the manoeuvring persists, the lift on the right side of the rotor disk will become insufficient, creating a rolling moment to the right. Gyroscopic effects will then cause the helicopter’s nose to pitch up. The way servo transparency manifests itself, with pitch-up and roll towards the retreating blades, is therefore similar to a retreating blade stall, although the two are distinct phenomena.

The helicopter's natural response to servo transparency is to a degree self-correcting, in that the pitch-up normally results in a reduction of airspeed, collective pitch, and rotor loading, which within a few seconds allow the servos to regain effectiveness. However, if a helicopters encounters servo transparency while in a turn towards the blades' retreating side, there is the risk that the bank angle could significantly increase and lead to loss of control, before an unsuspecting pilot has a chance to recognise the phenomenon and take corrective action.

When encountering servo transparency conditions, pilots are advised to immediately reduce the severity of the manoeuvre by following the controls movements, which allows the collective pitch to decrease naturally, thus lowering the rotor loading. The tendency to roll towards the retreating blades should be countered smoothly, to avoid abrupt roll inputs in the opposite direction once servo effectiveness is restored.

== Prevalence ==
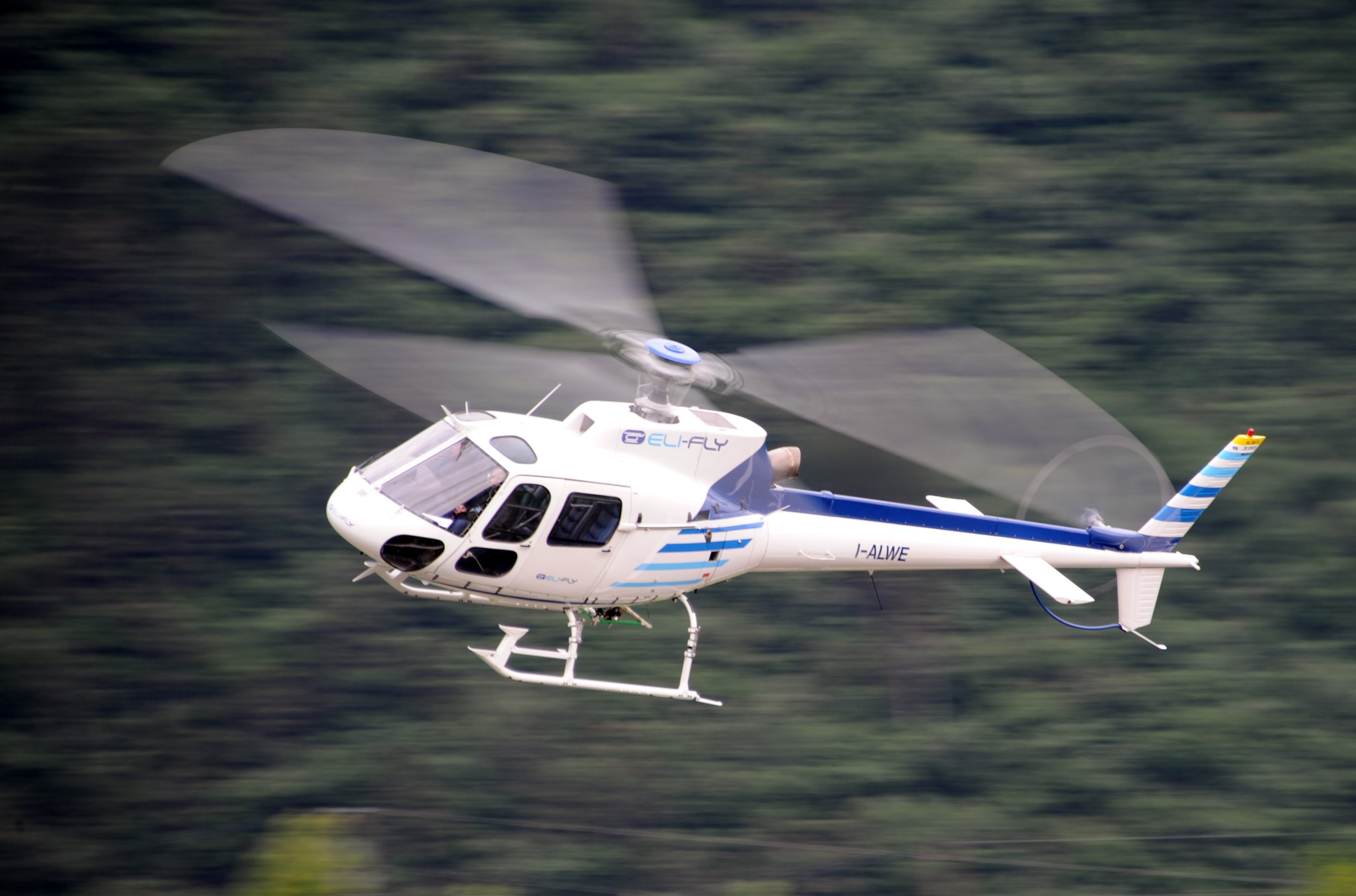
An AS350 B2 helicopter in flight

In general, factors that increase the risk of encountering servo transparency include:

- High airspeed
- High collective pitch input
- High gross weight
- High g-loads
- High density altitude
- Low servo hydraulic pressure

Servo transparency has been cited as a possible or likely contributing factor in several accidents involving helicopters of the Eurocopter AS350 family (now Airbus Helicopters H125), although in principle any helicopter fitted with hydraulically-assisted flight controls could experience the condition. The phenomenon has been described as a "well-known quirk of the Airbus AS 350".

In a widely circulated 2003 service letter on the subject, Eurocopter (now Airbus Helicopters) explains that servo transparency could be regarded as a consequence of the self-limiting structural design of the AS350. In other words, if the servo system was able to sustain any level of rotor loading induced by the pilot, therefore never entering servo transparency conditions, the rotor or the airframe could become subjected to overstress and suffer structural damage.

Nevertheless, in 2023, the European civil aviation regulator EASA, in response to a safety recommendation by the Norwegian Safety Investigation Authority "to establish a technical solution preventing [...] servo transparency", replied that an increase in hydraulic pressure or the fitting of a more capable dual hydraulic system could constitute such solution. The AS350 was originally fitted with a single hydraulic system; EASA remarked that no accidents attributable to servo transparency are known to have happened to AS350 B3e helicopters fitted or retrofitted with dual hydraulic system.

== Notable accidents involving servo transparency ==
- 15 September 2007: British rally driver Colin McRae and three passengers were killed in the crash of the AS350 helicopter he was flying. Servo transparency was cited as a possible factor in the accident.
- 31 August 2019: An H125 helicopter crashed in Alta, Norway, after entering servo transparency conditions. All six people on board were killed.
