= Jon-Ivar Nygård =

Norwegian politician (born 1973)

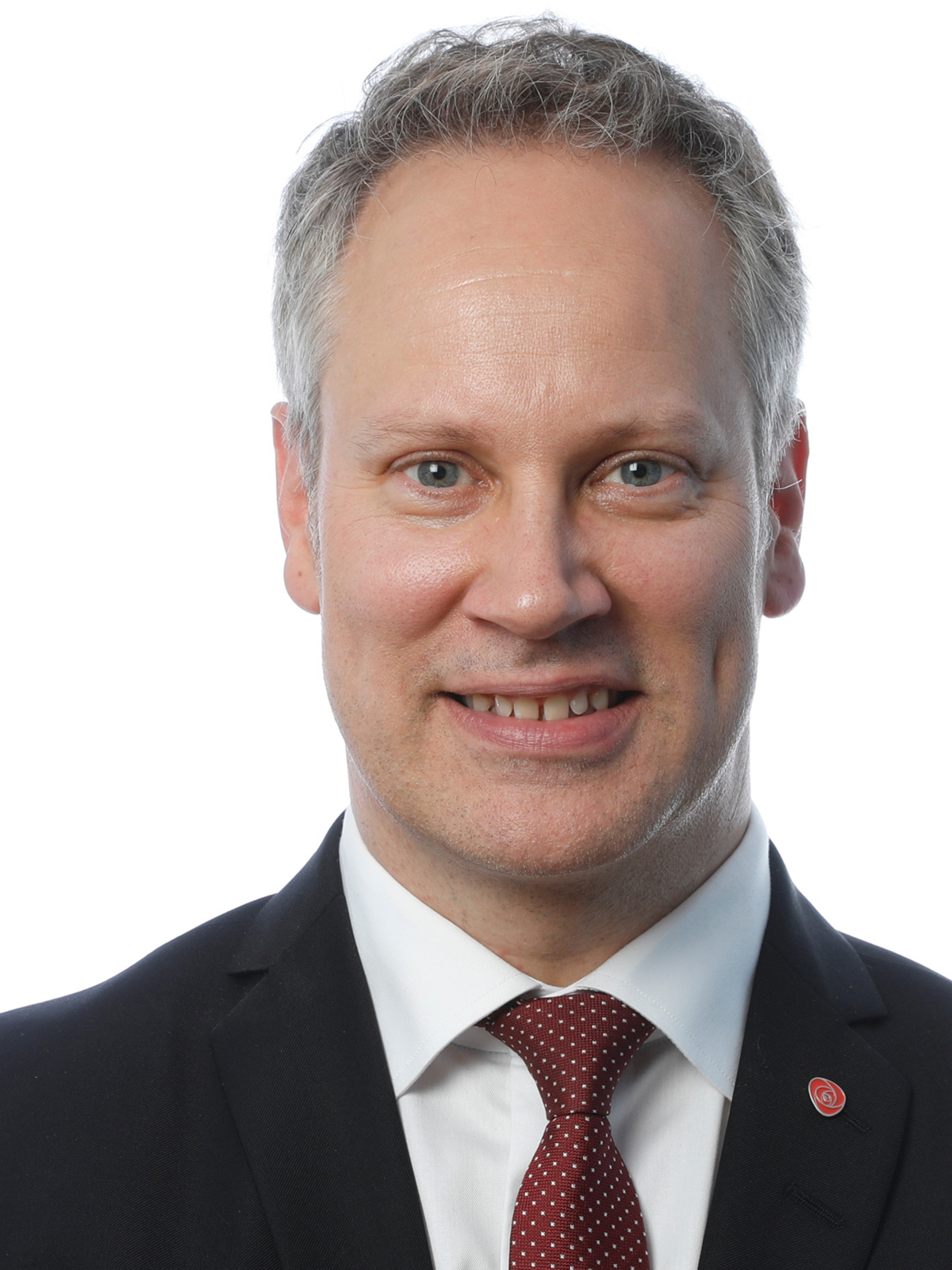

Minister of Transport
- In office 14 October 2021 – 11 September 2026
- Prime Minister: Jonas Gahr Støre
- Preceded by: Knut Arild Hareide
- Succeeded by: Kamzy Gunaratnam

Member of the Storting
- Incumbent
- Assumed office 1 October 2021
- Deputy: Solveig Vitanza (2021–2025); Ronny Aukrust (2025–2026)
- Constituency: Østfold

Deputy Member of the Storting
- In office 1 October 2013 – 30 September 2017
- Constituency: Østfold

Mayor of Fredrikstad
- In office 20 October 2011 – 21 October 2021
- Deputy: Kari Agerup; Siri Martinsen
- Preceded by: Eva Kristin Andersen
- Succeeded by: Siri Martinsen

Personal details
- Born: 2 January 1973 (age 53) Borge, Østfold, Norway
- Party: Labour
- Spouse: Anne Gro Bjerknes (m. 2023)
- Children: 3
- Education: University of Oslo; Østfold University College
- Occupation: Politician

Jon-Ivar Nygård (born 2 January 1973) is a Norwegian politician for the Labour Party. He served as minister of transport from 2021 to 2026. He previously served as the mayor of Fredrikstad from 2011 to 2021.

== Early and personal life ==
Born in Borge, Nygård graduated as cand.mag. from the University of Oslo in 1998. He lives with his partner, Anne Gro Bjerknes, and has three children from a previous relationship. He and Bjerknes married in January 2023.

== Political career ==
=== Local politics ===
He was member of the municipal council of Fredrikstad since 1993, and served as mayor of Fredrikstad from 2011 to 2021. He won re-election in 2015 and 2019. He resigned in 2021 upon entering parlament and his appointment to government and was succeeded by deputy mayor Siri Martinsen.

=== Parliament ===
Having previously been a deputy representative from 2013 to 2017, Nygård was elected representative to the Storting from the constituency of Østfold for the period 2021–2025, for the Labour Party. While part of the government from October 2021, Solveig Vitanza met in the Storting in his place until 2025 and Ronny Aukrust between 2025 and 2026.

=== Minister of Transport ===
On 14 October 2021, Nygård was appointed minister of transport in Jonas Gahr Støre's cabinet.

==== 2021 ====
Nygård announced that he wants an end to tenders for Norwegian train routes, and allocate routes directly to Vy. At the same time, he announced that foreign companies, like Go-Ahead and SJ, would keep their contracts until they expire.

In November, Nygård announced that the government would not cancel future construction of planned motorways, while also reiterating an increased focus on railways, notably InterCity.

On 15 November, Nygård and Minister of Labour and Social Inclusion Hadia Tajik met the head of SAS Norway, Kjetil Håbjørg, regarding the ongoing conflict with its staff. As a solution, Nygård was set to present the government's new aviation strategy, commenting: "We will create an aviation strategy, and Norwegian wage and working conditions will be important. It is about getting a good overview of how this is in the industry and having good control mechanisms".

In a press release on 8 December, it was announced that the government would expand the compensation scheme for train companies and commercial bus and ferry routes. Nygård stated: "The pandemic has not developed as we had hoped. New national measures have now been introduced to limit the spread of infection in society. We therefore expect that fewer travelers will use public transport. The government is therefore in favour of compensating train companies and commercial bus and boat routes for reduced ticket revenues until March 2022. If the infection control measures so require, the government will consider further extension". He also stressed that if they were the make cuts in the routes too early, they would risk losing more travellers that otherwise would return.

Green Party MP Rasmus Hansson criticised Nygård regarding a rise in prices for busses, which he sent in as a question for him to answer in the Storting. On 13 December, Nygård told media that the prices weren't too high, saying: "Until the COVID-19 outbreak, the number of travelers has increased as public transport has steadily improved. It is no wonder that an expanded offer costs something more. The fact that more and more people have found their way to public transport is a sign that pricing has not been too high". He went on to say: "I know that several county municipalities are working with new ticket products now as a result of changed travel habits, and I would like to wish them luck in the work of developing public transport now in a particularly difficult period".

After the government announced that they would be abolishing the aircraft passenger tax until 1 July 2022, as a part of new COVID-19 measures; Nygård commented: "The negative consequences for the industry may be more long-term, so that compensatory measures are needed over a longer period". He went on to say: "Without financial support, we risk unwanted and noticeable cuts in the route offers in aviation. This can lead to people who perform socially critical functions not being able to get to work, or patients not being able to get to and from the hospitals".

==== 2022 ====
In January 2022, he and labour minister Hadia Tajik announced that the government would take action against "workplace crime" in the transport sector. Nygård assessed that workplace criminality can spread from one workplace to the other, and that the transport sector was one of the most vulnerable. Further that if one company utilised illegal means, other companies could catch onto it as well. He also assessed that it would lead to a non sensical competition in the market, and lead to eventual further downward spiral. Nygård went on to stress the importance of "clearing the conditions".

Following revelations that tunnels in Western Norway had not been inspected properly, Conservative Party MP Liv Kari Eskeland asked in a written question to Nygård how road inspections should be followed up in said region. Nygård responded that "we take tunnel safety seriously" and that "Norwegian tunnels will become safer".

Nygård and the Ministry of Transport tasked the Norwegian Railway Directorate to make a concept study for the Northern Norway railway line. In a press release on 24 February, Nygård stated: "In this connection, the Norwegian Railway Directorate must see the report in connection with the adjacent railway sections Ofotbanen and Nordlandsbanen, and it must describe consequences for other parts of the railway network on both the Norwegian and Swedish sides".

Nygård announced on 22 April that the government would seek to get rid of extra monthly pay annually for the leadership of the state owned railway company Vy. He stated: "We want to give a clear signal that we believe it is time for moderation in all possible ways, and this also applies to our companies in the transport sector. Most of our companies have discontinued bonus schemes for a long time, but not Vy".

In early May, he expressed that the state might have to intervene when it came to payment for charging electric vehicles. He added that charging electric vehicles would have to become simpler, and solution could be ready in 2023.

In a press release in June, the Ministry of Transport asked for inputs regarding the reduction of road companies in the country. Nygård clarified that this would include the status of the government owned road company, Nye Veier AS. He stated: "Several major changes have been made to the organization of the road area, in particular the closure of (what was previously called) Sam's road administration and the establishment of Nye Veier". He went on to say: "We are concerned with avoiding fragmented professional environments, increased costs and less coherent development. The Hurdal platform says that we will investigate - that is because we actually want to assess how we can best move forward to achieve the goals for the road sector". He also noted that if the government had considered reversing Nye Veier's status, they would have done so.

On 6 July, he announced that the Ministry of Transport would be commencing a three step mapping plan for the railway industry after summer. The priority for the mapping is to find challenges within the railway industry and the shares responsibilities between the Ministry, the Railway Directorate and Bane NOR. Nygård emphasised that the government had high ambitions for the railway sector, and a goal to increase passenger and goods services.

On 15 August, Nygård visited Gudbrandsdalen following the collapse of the Tretten Bridge. While visiting the site of the collapse, he said: "A bridge collapse like this is a significant event, as we cannot currently understand why it has happened and in that sense it is quite worrying". He also called for an external investigation of the collapse and an inspection of other wooden bridges. Aud M. Riseng, Innlandet county's chief of transport, assured that they would be inspecting other wooden bridges, but not necessarily close them unless necessary.

On 9 September, Nygård confirmed that he would take the initiative to seek an evaluation of the possibility of merging Vy and Flytoget. He argued that the initiative was in line with the Hurdal platform, which sought to evaluate whether or not Norway should have one or two state owned rail companies.

On 27 September, Nygård expressed that the National Transport Plan (NTP, nasjonal transportplan) would be unrealistic, and that planned transport projects would be put on hold. He didn't specify which projects would be affected, as this would be revealed in the state budget for 2023.

On 19 November, Governing Mayor of Oslo Raymond Johansen and City Commissioner Sirin Stav called on the government to scrap several road projects around the capital, including transforming some streets into "environmental streets". In response, Nygård stated that the professional services would be imposed to include climate measures as a criterion. He also emphasised how much is being done to make the Norwegian transport sector as environmentally friendly as possible.

On 13 December, Nygård and foreign minister Anniken Huitfeldt announced that Norway would be donating bridge parts to Ukraine to help the country rebuild its infrastructure. He stated: "We know that these bridges will help Ukraine, while this does not weaken our own bridge readiness. The war in Ukraine requires Europe to stand together. We want to contribute when we are asked, with what Norway has the expertise and capacity for".

==== 2023 ====
In early January 2023, following a meeting with the Norwegian Railway Directorate, the Railway Authority and Bane NOR, Nygård announced that he saw the need for an investigation into the incident at the opening of the Follo Line. He also expressed that some of the information he was told in the meeting was "concerning". However, a few days later, Aftenposten revealed that Nygård had been informed about the incident on 23 December by Bane NOR despite him publicly saying otherwise. The opposition criticised Nygård's actions, with the Progress Party accusing him of misinformation. The Socialist Left Party said that the matter seemed to become "a bigger and bigger scandal". Nygård responded saying that Bane NOR had clarified that they had been uncertain about the cause of the incident on 27 December, but had narrowed it down to being the heating developments. In March, Aftenposten revealed that Nygård had given a secret instruction to the Railway Directorate, asking them to allow Vy to be offered one of two railway stretches being negotiated. In effect, this blocked Flytoget from giving an offer to run both stretches to compete with Vy. The opposition parties accused Nygård of having given limited negotiation powers to the Railway Directorate and that the government as a whole, had little regard for passengers.

Appearing before the Storting in June, Nygård expressed his disagreement with the Norwegian Public Roads Administration's findings that multiple road projects in Hordaland would be less socially beneficial to reach the climate goals. One of their findings included raising the fuel costs to 50kr per litre, which Nygård argued would not be relevant. He also emphasised that more views would be needed to estimate how the future would look like should emissions be cut drastically to reach Norway's climate goals.

In September, the government announced that they would make future motorways slimmer in order to save the environment, reuse existing roads and decrease intervention in nature. Nygård argued that it would be a more responsible road policy and that more resources could be used to achieve a better road standard for the population.

On 7 December, he announced that the government would allow electric and gas powered vehicles to pay a lower tolls price. Nygård additionally said that this measure was a part of making transport less fossil driven and reducing emissions, while also calling it "a step in the right direction".

==== 2024 ====
In February, the Norwegian Public Roads Administration announced that it would be abolishing the practical test in the process for receiving a taxi license, which Nygård and his ministry had requested earlier. He did emphasise that the demands in achieving such a license would still be in place, with notabilities like a theoretical test and the Passenger Carrying Vehicle driver's license.

Ahead of the government's National Transport Plan, Nygård and defence minister Bjørn Arild Gram visited Trøndelag in March to inspect motorways which would require upgrading in order to support military infrastructure in the event of armed conflict. Among other projects in the county aimed for upgrading includes the Ofoten Line, European route E14 and other motorways put as a priority for the Norwegian Army.

Nygård came under fire from mayors of Asker and Bærum in late August for refusing to allow electric vehicles to travel in bus lanes on week days due to traffic jams on the European route E18. He had previously stated that the government would allow electric vehicles in bus lanes on weekends, but citing his rejection for week days to be on grounds of capacity during these periods.

Akershus County Commissioner for Transport Håkon Snortheim criticised Nygård in late September for failing to implement sufficient measures in the transport industry, notably citing the government's decision to merge Flytoget and Vy and other issues with rail transport. Nygård rejected the criticism and claimed that the government has been increasing their budgets and prioritised projects that will help improve public transport.

Nygård faced extensive criticism from the opposition over train delays in Eastern Norway at a question time session in December. He had earlier pledged that the railway traffic would be more punctual and on schedule in 2024. His response acknowledged that the scheduling hadn't gone to plan and that there had been too many delays. Furthermore, he acknowledged that he might have overestimated his own pledge, but argued that he wanted to demonstrate to the sector and customers that punctuality would be a priority.

==== 2025 ====
Nygård announced in early March that the government would be allowing cities to determine themselves if they want to implement net zero zones, hailing it as an important tool for municipalities to develop an ambitious climate policy. Additionally, the Ministry of Transport announced that it would task the Norwegian Public Roads Administration to prepare and submit a proposal for legislation and regulations for consultation which would grant municipalities this authority.

In early June, Nygård admitted to misleading parliament and that a sentence in the government's budget regarding the Civil Aviation Authority inspections, which were legally required, were 111 of these weren't followed up on in the last two years. The issue was brought up by the Conservative Party and further supported by the Progress Party and Socialist Left Party.

With the government's legislation banning sideways adjusted seats and standing arrangements on Russ buses from 2026, in September Nygård dismissed continued calls from Russ about a transition period for the legislation. He argued that with the announcement of the legislation back in 2024, the Russ would have had time to adapt to the upcoming changes and that the legislation was intended to improve traffic safety. He did however express sympathy for any economic strain it would put on Russ paying for seating arrangements to be upgraded to comply with the legislation.

He announced in October that the government would not recall Chinese made Yutong buses operated by Ruter despite them discovering that the manufacturer could stop and control them. The Ministry of Transport would however still evaluate how buses from overseas generally, could affect national security.

==== 2026 ====
Opposition parties expressed in February 2026 that they would potentially pursue a scrutiny case against Nygård over misleading parliament over a delay in the construction of double lines on the Dovre Line. Though Nygård had previously stated that he had been informs about the delay the month before, but reports indicate that his ministry was informed about it in April 2025 and that he knew of the delay when informing parliament the same month, but he never disclosed information about the delay of the project. In his defence, Nygård argued that parliament still had been properly informed about the project's progression and economic spending.

Nygård announced in March that the government would be reversing their proposal to make cuts in deliveries of mail once a week. This was after the proposal received negative feedback during its hearing in parliament and from the post industry itself. Nygård emphasised the costs of mail deliveries, but highlighted that the government would ensure that people still received effective services for a lower cost.

In June, after facing criticism by the opposition for not adressering capacity issues on the Vestfold Line, Nygård responded that the government is working to resolve the issue, citing the government's plans to merge Flytoget and Vy and establishing regional trains. Furthermore, he noted that state secretaries also represent government leadership in order to address public concerns. Vy also addressed the same concerns, citing Bane NOR's reduced maintenance capacity as a cause to a shortage in train sets and that passengers will get a refund if they don't receive their assigned seats.

Nygård and his ministry were criticised in July when chair of the Standing Committee on Transport and Communications, Bård Hoksrud, accused them of secrecy and hiding issues related to the Vestfold Line, after a meeting with Norske tog was cancelled in May. The ministry had advised them to not meet with Hoksrud, citing the lack of equal access to information by all political parties. Nygård defended the decision, citing his brief to the Storting that same month was sufficient information about the issue, but didn't necessarily mean Hoksrud's cancelled meeting was because of it. His and the ministry's handling of the case was criticsed by a transparency expert, who found it problematic that the ministry had declined to meet with an opposition politician for the sake of "the lack of equal opportunity of information for all parties".

He left the government in a cabinet reshuffle on 11 September 2026.

Political offices
Preceded by Knut Arild Hareide	Minister of Transport; 2021–2026	Succeeded by Kamzy Gunaratnam
Preceded by Eva Kristin Andersen	Mayor of Fredrikstad; 2011–2021	Succeeded by Siri Martinsen
