= Technical Supervisory Authority for Cableways (Norway) =

Norwegian government agency, 1977–2012

- Taubanetilsynet

Agency overview
- Formed: 1 July 1977
- Dissolved: 1 January 2012
- Superseding agency: Norwegian Railway Authority
- Jurisdiction: Norway
- Headquarters: Trondheim
- Parent agency: Norwegian Ministry of Transport and Communications
- Website: www.taubanetilsynet.no

The Technical Supervisory Authority for Cableways (Norwegian: Taubanetilsynet) was the Norwegian authority responsible for cableways, including cable cars, aerial tramways, funiculars, ski lifts and similar installations. The authority has since 1 July 1977 been performed by the Trondheim office of Det Norske Veritas (DNV) on contract with the Norwegian Ministry of Transport and Communications. The agency is self-financing and covers its costs through fees based on the services provided. The agency was dissolved on 1 January 2012 and the responsibility transferred to the Norwegian Railway Authority.
