= Ministry of Transport (Norway) =

Government ministry of Norway

Royal Ministry of Transport
- Det kongelige samferdselsdepartement

Agency overview
- Formed: 22 February 1946; 80 years ago
- Preceding agency: Ministry of Labour
- Jurisdiction: Government of Norway
- Headquarters: Oslo
- Minister responsible: Jon-Ivar Nygård, Minister of Transport
- Agency executive: Villa Kulild, Secretary General
- Website: Official website

Footnotes
- List of Norwegian ministries

The Royal Norwegian Ministry of Transport, also referred as Ministry of Transport and Communications (Norwegian: Samferdselsdepartementet, SD) is a Norwegian ministry established in 1946, and is responsible for transportation in Norway. The ministry was responsible for communication infrastructure until may 2019, when the responsibility for the Norwegian Communications Authority was transferred to Ministry of Local Government and Regional Development. Since October 2021, the ministry has been headed by Jon-Ivar Nygård of the Labour Party. The department must report to the parliament (Stortinget).

== Organization ==
=== Political staff ===
As of September 2025, the political staff of the ministry is as follows

- Minister of Transport Jon-Ivar Nygård (Labour Party)
- State Secretary Tom Kalsås (Labour Party)
- State Secretary Abel Cecilie Knibe Kroglund (Labour Party)
- Political Adviser Jakob Vorren (Labour Party)

=== Department ===
The ministry has 135 employees and is divided into the following sections:

- Political staff
- Communication Unit
- Department of Management, Administration and Public Safety and Security
- Department of Civil Aviation, Postal services and Procurement of Non-Commercial Transport
- Department of Planning and Rail transport
- Department of Public Roads, Urban Mobility and Traffic Safety

=== Subsidiaries ===
Under the ministry there are seven administrative agencies and four state-owned limited companies:

- Avinor (Airport operator, company)
- Bane NOR (Railway infrastructure, company)
- Baneservice (Construction, company)
- Norwegian Accident Investigation Board
- Norwegian Civil Aviation Authority
- Norwegian Railway Directorate
- Norwegian Railway Inspectorate
- Technical Supervisory Authority for Cableways
- Vygruppen AS (Vy) (company)
- Entur AS (company)
- Posten (Postal service, company)
- Statens Vegvesen (Public Roads Administration)

The department owned 1/3 of Stor-Oslo Lokaltrafikk that organised the public transport in Akershus.

Note: The railway company Airport Express Train, the Norwegian Maritime Directorate and the Norwegian Ship Registers are subsidiaries of the Norwegian Ministry of Trade and Industry while Kystverket is a subsidiary of the Norwegian Ministry of Fisheries and Coastal Affairs.

== See also ==
- List of Norwegian Ministers of Transport
