= Dagrun Eriksen =

Norwegian politician

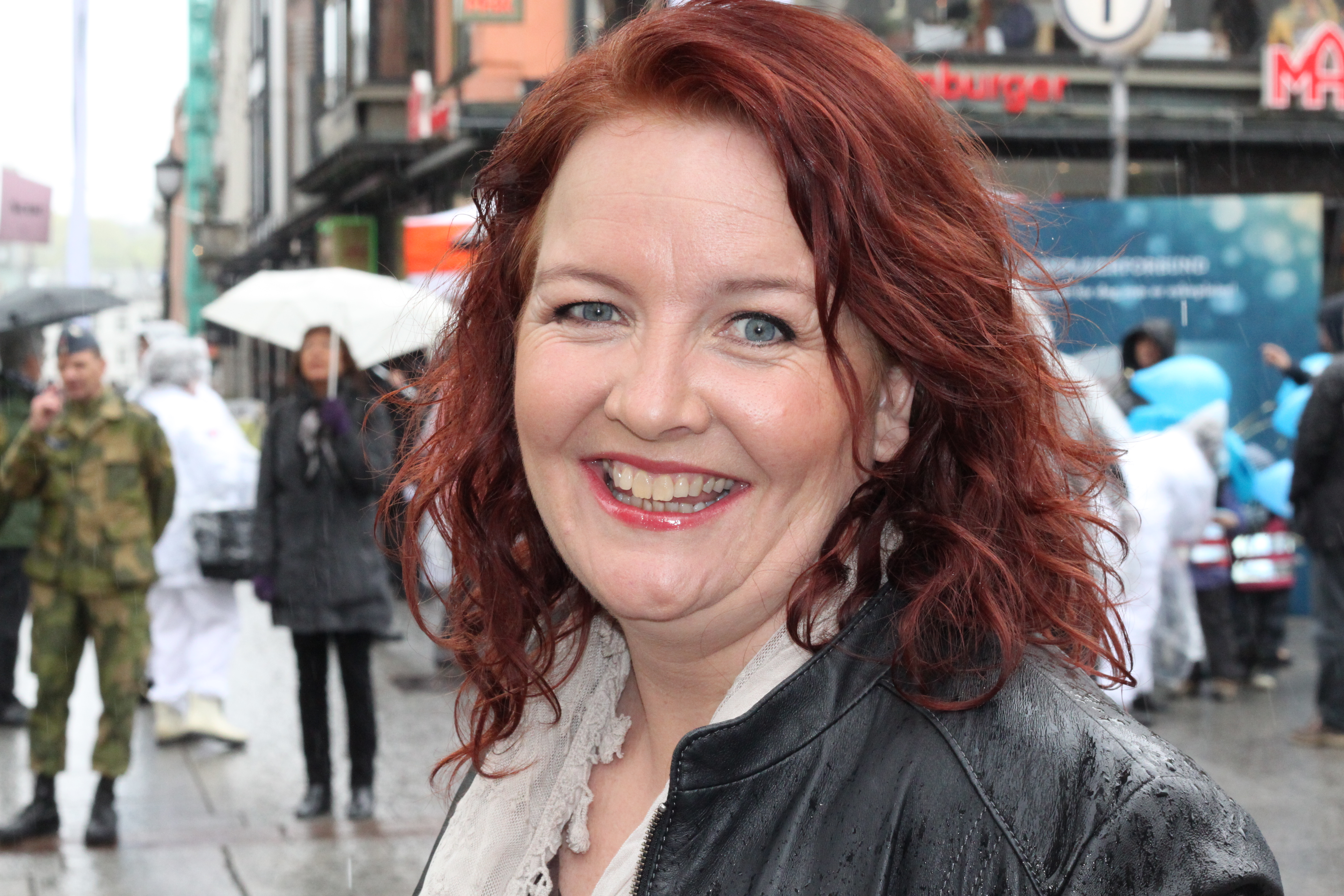

First Deputy Leader of the Christian Democratic Party
- In office 23 January 2004 – 29 April 2017
- Leader: Dagfinn Høybråten; Knut Arild Hareide
- Succeeded by: Olaug Bollestad

Member of the Norwegian Parliament
- In office 21 August 2006 – 30 September 2013
- Preceded by: Jon Lilletun
- Constituency: Vest-Agder
- In office 1 October 2001 – 30 September 2005
- Constituency: Vest-Agder

Deputy Member of the Norwegian Parliament
- In office 1 October 2005 – 21 August 2006
- Deputising for: Jon Lilletun
- Constituency: Vest-Agder
- In office 17 October 1997 – 17 March 2000
- Deputising for: Jon Lilletun
- Constituency: Vest-Agder

Personal details
- Born: 28 June 1971 (age 54); Kristiansand, Vest-Agder, Norway
- Political party: Christian Democratic

Dagrun Eriksen (born 28 June 1971 in Kristiansand) is a Norwegian politician for the Christian Democratic Party. She served as deputy leader of the party from 2004 to 2017.

== Political career ==
Eriksen was elected into the Norwegian parliament (Storting) from the county of Vest-Agder in 2001. She was not re-elected in the 2005 elections, but took Jon Lilletun's seat upon his illness and later death. In 2009 she had the top spot on the party's ballot in Vest-Agder and

In 2012 Eriksen lost a fight for the top spot on the party's list for the 2013 Norwegian parliamentary election to Hans Fredrik Grøvan and will not be on the ballot at all. Possible explanations for her loss according to pundits might have been that she was perceived to have focused too much on national politics and too little on the county's particular issues and that she was perceived as too liberal on some issues.

== Parliamentary Presidium duties ==
- 2005 – 2009 vice secretary of Lagstinget.

== Parliamentary Committee duties ==
- 2001 – present, member of Standing Committee on Education, Research and Church Affairs, second deputy chair since 2006, first deputy chair since 2009
- 2001 – 2005 member of the Family, Culture and Administration committee.
- 1997 – 2001 member of the Defense committee until 17 March 2000.
