= 2011 Dalamot helicopter crash =

Aviation incident in Norway

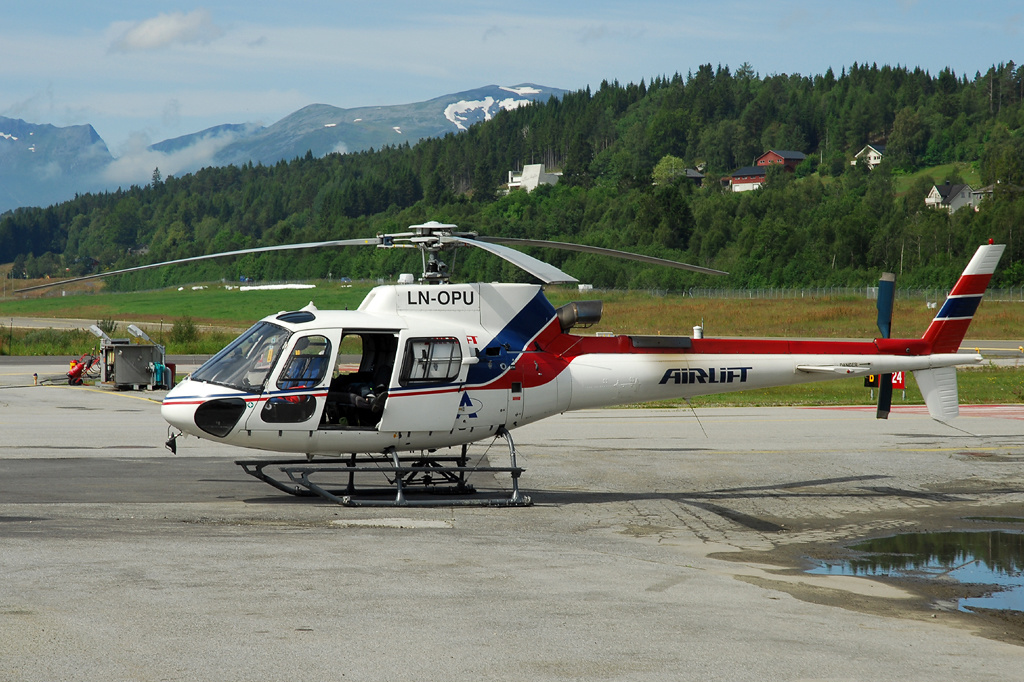
- An Airlift Airbus AS350 similar to the one involved

Accident
- Date: July 4, 2011
- Summary: Loss of control due to abrupt maneuver
- Site: Dalamot, Ullensvang, Norway; 60°24′27″N 6°58′18″E

Aircraft
- Aircraft type: Eurocopter AS350 Écureuil
- Operator: Airlift
- Registration: LN-OXC
- Flight origin: Kinsarvik
- Destination: Kinsarvik
- Occupants: 5
- Passengers: 4
- Crew: 1
- Fatalities: 4
- Survivors: 0

On 4 July 2011, a Airlift Eurocopter AS 350 helicopter crashed in Dalamot in the Ullensvang Municipality, killing all five people on board.

The accident was investigated by the Norwegian Safety Investigation Authority (SHT). The SHT concluded that the accident was caused by a "sudden maneuver."
