= Knut Arild Hareide =

Norwegian politician

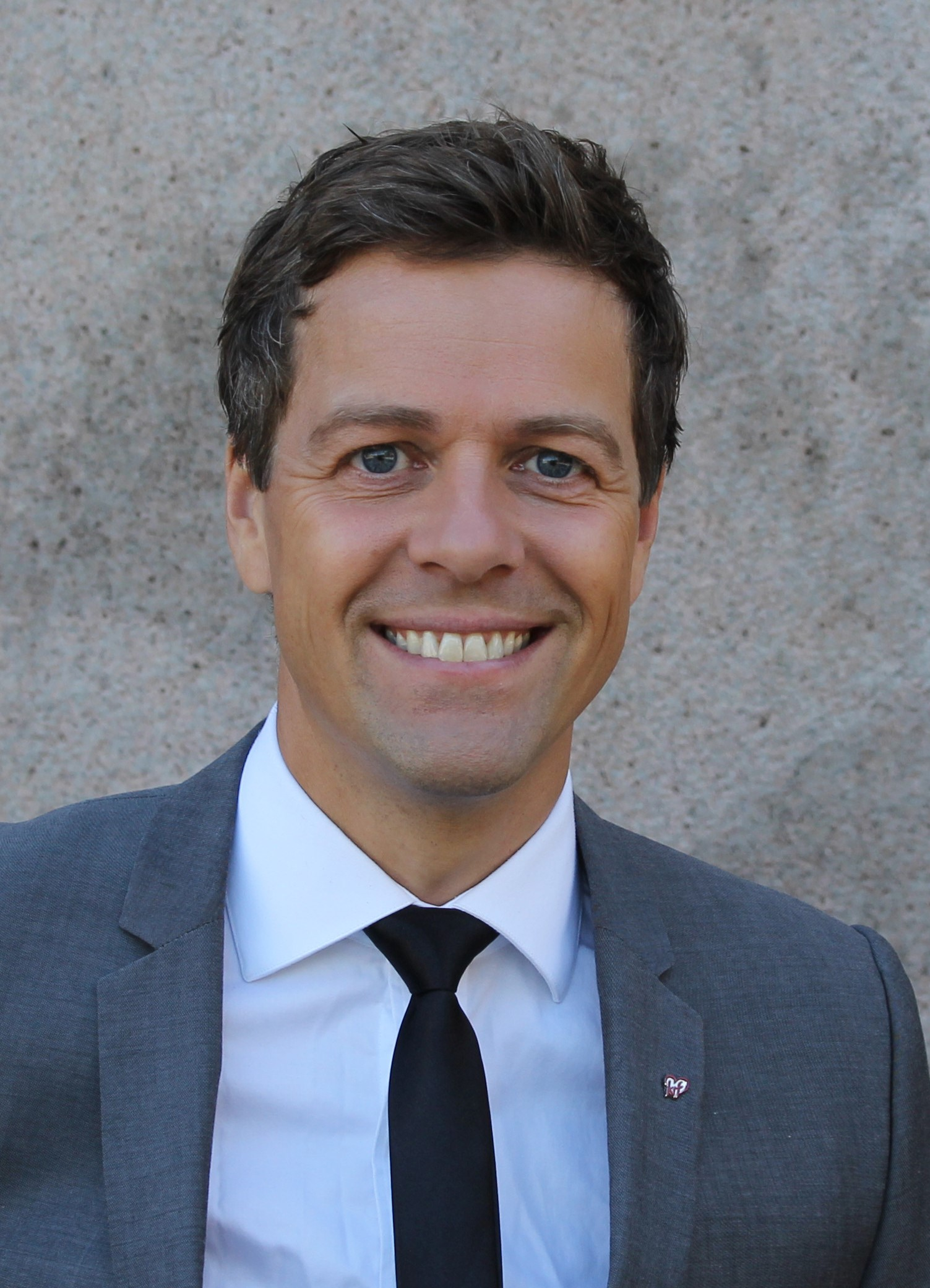

Minister of Transport and Communications
- In office 24 January 2020 – 14 October 2021
- Prime Minister: Erna Solberg
- Preceded by: Jon Georg Dale
- Succeeded by: Jon-Ivar Nygård

Leader of the Christian Democratic Party
- In office 30 April 2011 – 17 January 2019
- First Deputy: Dagrun Eriksen; Olaug Bollestad
- Second Deputy: Olaug Bollestad; Kjell Ingolf Ropstad
- Preceded by: Dagfinn Høybråten
- Succeeded by: Kjell Ingolf Ropstad

Christian Democratic Parliamentary Leader
- In office 16 October 2013 – 29 January 2019
- Leader: Himself
- Preceded by: Hans Olav Syversen
- Succeeded by: Hans Fredrik Grøvan

Minister of the Environment
- In office 18 June 2004 – 17 October 2005
- Prime Minister: Kjell Magne Bondevik
- Preceded by: Børge Brende
- Succeeded by: Helen Bjørnøy

Member of the Norwegian Parliament
- In office 1 October 2013 – 30 September 2021
- Deputy: Torill Selsvold Nyborg
- Constituency: Hordaland
- In office 1 October 2009 – 30 September 2013
- Constituency: Akershus

Personal details
- Born: 23 November 1972 (age 53) Bømlo Municipality, Hordaland, Norway
- Party: Christian Democratic
- Spouse: Lisa Marie Larsen (m. 2012)
- Children: 2
- Education: NHH; University of Bergen
- Website: Knut Arild Hareide's blog

Knut Arild Hareide (born 23 November 1972) is a Norwegian former politician who served as a member of parliament from Hordaland and as the leader of the Christian Democratic Party from 2011 to 2019. He served as Minister of Transport and Communications from 2020 to 2021, and as Minister of the Environment from 2004 to 2005 in the second Bondevik cabinet. In 2007, he announced he would step down from the national political scene for the time being, but he returned when he was nominated as the top candidate for the Christian Democratic Party ticket in Akershus in the 2009 election, winning the county's leveling seat. After Dagfinn Høybråten stepped down as party leader, Hareide was unanimously elected to take his place at the 2011 party convention. In the 2013 election, Hareide was reelected to parliament, this time from his home county of Hordaland.

Before his tenure as government minister, Hareide had served one term in the municipal council of his native Bømlo Municipality, served as a deputy representative to the national parliament as well as working two years as a State Secretary. He was also second deputy leader of his party from 2003 to 2007, having come through the ranks of the party's youth organization.

Outside politics, Hareide is an economist by education and he has worked for the media conglomerate Schibsted.

== Education ==
Hareide was born in the village of Rubbestadneset in Bømlo Municipality, Hordaland. He started his higher education in 1992, the same year he graduated from upper secondary school. Enrolled at the Norwegian School of Economics (NHH), he graduated in 1997 with a siv.øk. degree. During his time at NHH, he also minored in sociology (1995) at the University of Bergen.

Hareide was active in student politics. His involvement included terms as a member of the student parliament at the University of Bergen, as the leader of the Student Union of the Norwegian School of Economics 1994–1995, and as a board member of the national student union 1993–1994. During his time in student politics, Hareide held a Christian democratic middle ground between radical (such as later socialist politician Aslak Sira Myhre) and conservative representatives, an experience he has described as educational.

== Career ==
Hareide was active in the Youth of the Christian People's Party, being a member of the national board 1999–2001 before joining the national board of the Christian Democratic Party. He worked as a political advisor in the Ministry of Church Affairs, Education and Research from 1998 to 2000, during the first cabinet Bondevik. He later became State Secretary in the Ministry of Finance from 2001 to 2003 during the second cabinet Bondevik. In 2003 he became second deputy leader of the Christian Democratic Party nationwide.

He then joined the cabinet during a 2004 reshuffle, serving as the Norwegian Minister of the Environment from summer 2004 to autumn 2005. He was the youngest ever cabinet member from the Christian Democratic Party, and the first Christian Democrat to hold the post. The second cabinet Bondevik did not survive the 2005 elections, and Hareide therefore had to step down from office that year. His successor was Helen Bjørnøy. Until 2009, Hareide had never been elected to the Norwegian Parliament, but served as a deputy representative during the terms 1997–2001, 2001–2005 and 2005–2009. At the local level, he was a member of the municipal council of Bømlo Municipality from 1991 to 1995.

In 2007 Hareide announced that he had left politics for the time being to pursue a career in the national media conglomerate Schibsted, as an organizational director. His career in the company started with the position of trainee in 1997. Outside politics, his only paid full-time appointments have been in Schibsted. He continued to work behind the scenes for his party, occasionally commenting on issues in the national media. He did not rule out a return to national politics in the future, and in late 2008 he was selected by his party as the top candidate on the party's ticket in Akershus county. The Christian Democratic Party formerly held a seat in this county, but lost it in 2005. Hareide has never lived in Akershus. Party leader Dagfinn Høybråten hails from Akershus, but he runs on the Rogaland ticket to secure a safe seat.

Prior to the 2009 election, Hareide announced that he would leave national politics if he failed to win a parliament seat. Although the Christian Democrats suffered nationwide setbacks in 2009, Hareide managed to win Akershus' levelling seat after a close race against Dagfinn Sundsbø of the Centre Party. In parliament, Hareide became the chair of the Standing Committee on Transport and Communications.

After Høybråten announced that he would not seek reelection as party leader of KrF, Hareide quickly emerged as the leading candidate to succeed Høybråten, after the two other apparent candidates, Dagrun Eriksen and Hans Olav Syversen, announced they would not run. Hareide is considered to belong to the socially liberal wing of the party, and conservative members of the party have demanded that at least one of the deputy leaders be from the party's conservative wing if they are to support Hareide. Hareide supported the efforts to eliminate the rule which requires Christian Democratic party representatives to declare a Christian faith, and a vote gave a clear majority to abolish that rule two years later. Hareide was unanimously voted in as new party leader at the 2011 convention on 30 April 2011. Hareide declined the nomination as parliamentary leader, and Hans Olav Syversen was elected to this position.

On 18 November 2011 Hareide was appointed to lead the parliamentary committee that is investigating the 2011 Norway Attacks. His nomination to that position was proposed by the red-green parties. On 23 January 2012 Hareide denounced a speech at KrF's local chapter in Sarpsborg that had suggested that the terrorist attacks and the Alexander Kielland disaster were divine warnings or punishments for Norway's policy towards Israel; Hareide said that this was far beyond normal thinking and completely out of line with the party's values.

=== Reception and issues ===
Following the 11th United Nations Climate Change Convention in Buenos Aires in December 2004, Hareide spoke out against the United States and China, whom he saw as "problems" in the international work against climate change. Hareide gained a fair level of praise for his role in the convention, from both his own party as well as political opponents.

Hareide received heavy criticism for the policy on large carnivores. A decision in early 2005, to uphold the ongoing wolf hunt even though a certain alpha she-wolf Gråfjellstispa had mistakenly been shot in January that year, was met with protests from the national World Wildlife Fund chapter and other environment organizations, as well as the Swedish Minister of the Environment Lena Sommestad and representatives from the European Union. Hareide described the event as "regrettable", but "not against the law". The case made headlines in BBC and New Scientist. A few weeks before, Hareide had been criticized in a parliamentary hearing session for being too wolf-friendly. The environmental organizations went as far as to press charges against the Ministry of the Environment. The Ministry was acquitted when the case was finally brought up in late 2006, some time after Hareide left office.

In July the same year, Hareide received further criticism as the number of licenses to kill large carnivores allegedly was not only at a record high (12 brown bears, 10 grey wolves, 22 wolverines and 13 lynx), but also contradictory to the parliamentary policy on the matter. According to Hareide, the actions were in line with the parliamentary stance on the issue.

In April 2005 he was criticized for an issue connected to monetary support of environmental projects and organizations. The Ministry approved a $90,000 project support for the Church of Norway, while the pressure group Bellona faced a cut of the same amount. Hareide, being a devout Christian and a member of the Church of Norway, was accused of putting his own religious interests ahead of environmental considerations. The case became a curiosity in the Norwegian media as some of the money was channelled into the church internet site, which, among other things, contained a set of prayers for earthworms – described in such odd terms as "the blind subterranean workers", "small sisters and brothers in the compost" and "members of the subterranean congregation". Hareide responded to the criticism by describing the overall project as "exciting".

One of Hareide's last actions in office was to approve the construction of a hydroelectric power plant in the Hatteberg watershed in Kvinnherad, a protected natural area. Most of the criticism went to his successor, Helen Bjørnøy, who neglected to roll back the decision when assuming office. She eventually resigned halfway into her term.

During his time as Minister of the Environment, Hareide was parodied in the television comedy program Tre brødre som ikke er brødre. The character Knut Arild Hareide, played by Harald Eia, was portrayed in several sketches as a physically weak person. These parodies were criticized by the authors in a 2005 book about different forms of mobbing; this stirred a minor debate in the Norwegian media. Nonetheless, Hareide himself showed a video clip of one of the parodies when publicly announcing his stepdown from national politics at the 2007 party congress.

In a poll taken in December 2013, Hareide received a 99 percent approval rating among Christian Democratic voters.

=== Resignation from party leadership ===
In September 2018, Hareide gave his party an ultimatum, that they should either join the Labour Party and Centre Party to form a government, thereby toppling the Solberg Cabinet, or enter the Solberg Cabinet, consisting of the Conservatives, Progress Party and Liberals. Hareide led the Labour-favoured campaign, and had it been successful, it would have led to Jonas Gahr Støre becoming prime minister. On the opposing side,Kjell Ingolf Ropstad and Olaug Bollestad favoured entering the cabinet. At the party conference on 2 November, the party voted to enter the Solberg cabinet. Negotiations eventually started to enter the cabinet, led by Ropstad himself. Hareide resigned as party leader in January 2019 and subsequently as parliamentary leader twelve days later. He was succeeded by Ropstad at the party conference in April the same year.

In October 2019, he announced that he didn't want to seek re-election to Parliament in the 2021 election.

=== Return as minister ===
In January 2020, about a year after the Christian Democrats entered the Solberg cabinet, the Progress Party withdrew from the government over the decision to repatriate a woman and her sick child from Syria, which the party opposed. Hareide returned from a committee trip, presumed to be because of the changes in the government, something he didn't confirm or deny upon his arrival at Oslo Gardermoen Airport. By 23 January, rumours circulated that he might be appointed as minister, which was confirmed the following day, when he was appointed transport minister. This marked the first time since Bondevik's second cabinet that Hareide held a ministerial post. His appointment was criticized by the Progress Party, who saw it as a taunt given his opposition entering the Solberg Cabinet in 2018.

=== Minister of Transport and Communications ===
After Widerøe announced in February 2020, that they would cut 15 percent of their short-haul routes, Hareide criticised the move and called it "dramatic". He stressed that the airline's services were crucial for the districts and regions, and warned that it would impact citizens all over the country. The Labour Party blamed the airline's decision on the government for a lack of district policies.

In June 2020, Hareide announced that COVID-19 restrictions on airlines, notably SAS, Norwegian Air Shuttle and Widerøe, would be lifted, and that they would be able to fly with full seats. Hareide stated it was a wish from the airlines, and that the government deemed it defensible based on infection control.

Following controversy regarding the Hungarian low-cost airline Wizzair possibly breaching Norwegian laws, Hareide, alongside trade minister Iselin Nybø, met virtually with representatives from the airline in early December 2020. Hareide told the press that he made himself clear about the Norwegian labour model, and expressed that he felt that he "spoke like Harald Eia" when explaining the model for the airline representatives.

On 20 April 2021, the opposition passed a motion that would ensure the beginning of the construction of the Northern Norway Line. Hareide criticised the motion, saying "my concern is that we will be creating expectations that I think are unrealistic to deliver upon". He also stressed the construction of the new line would cost more than the originally expected 107–120 NOK. He further added that "I think Northern Norway should really think if they want this railway line. Everything indicates it will cost a lot, lot more".

Following revelations of company bonuses at Norwegian Air Shuttle in late June 2021, Hareide called it a "serious betrayal" from the company, and that it would make it difficult for the government to assist the aviation sector next time a crisis could occur.

After extensive criticism of the Norwegian Public Roads Administration's handling of driving tests waiting time, in July 2021, Hareide stated that even retired instructors were brought in to compensate capacity. He also expressed criticism to the Centre Party's Maren Grøthe, that only fully qualified instructors could step in, not ones that were nearly done with their education, because it would breach the bare minimum demand from the EEA.

At the end of August, Hareide attended the opening ceremony in Trondheim for the country's first hybrid driven train that would be going on the Trønder- and Røros line. The Trøndelag county mayor Tore O. Sandvik was also invited to the ceremony, but didn't attend, in protest against the purchase. He expressed that the entire Trønder line should be electrified instead. Hareide responded to his criticism by saying that electrifying railway lines will take time, and indicated that hybrid trains was a step in the right direction. He also gave a reassurance, saying that electrifying railway lines is a work in progress.

In early September, Hareide asked the Norwegian Railway Directorate to evaluate the timeframe, costs and necessary prerequisites for a possible night train to Copenhagen, by 1 November. Hareide expressed he imagined it could either be a public purchase or an exposure to completion for the route. He further stated that it was an exciting concept, "both that and to get a train to Malmö, Copenhagen and Europe beyond".

A few days before the 2021 election, Hareide asked the Railway Directorate to get in touch with the Swedish Transport Administration to make a common proposal for a possible railway connection between Oslo and Stockholm, something both country's authorities have agreed to do. Hareide stressed the importance to map out the marked potential, evaluating the railway capacity, evaluate the costs, possible tracks, and social economic estimations. He also expressed that it should receive inputs from non-state initiatives, who could in turn see the potential for building such a railway without state investments.

Despite the Storting approving in February to abolish the need for health certificate for elderly drivers, Hareide stated in October that he would not oblige to the decision. Instead he defended the certificate, saying it was an important tool to keep drivers safe. He also referred to it being the professional opinion to keep the certificate, but also said it was up to the new government to handle the issue further.

=== Director of the Norwegian Maritime Authority ===
On 12 November 2021, he was nominated to become the next director of the Norwegian Maritime Authority. He assumed office on 1 January 2022.

On 5 December 2021, a month before assuming the position, he announced that he and his family would be moving to Karmøy Municipality in relation to his new job.

=== Director of the Norwegian Shipowners' Association ===
In March 2024, it was announced that Hareide would be taking over as director of the Norwegian Shipowners' Association, starting 1 August.

== Personal life ==
Hareide comes from a middle-class background, his father being a transportation manager and his mother a consultant.

Although reluctant to comment on the issue, Hareide was likely single during his first tenure in national politics. He has been confronted with rumours of homosexuality by segments of the media, but these have been dismissed. In 2008 he was reported as having a relationship with Solveig Engevik from Kolbotn, which ended in 2010. In the spring of 2011 he was confirmed in a relationship with school teacher Lisa Marie Larsen. The couple married in Moi on 23 June 2012, and had a daughter on 6 April 2013.

Political offices
| Preceded by Jon Georg Dale | Minister of Transport and Communications; 2020–2021 | Succeeded by Jon-Ivar Nygård |
| Preceded by Børge Brende | Minister of the Environment; 2004–2005 | Succeeded by Helen Bjørnøy |
| Preceded by Per Sandberg | Chair of the Standing Committee on Transport and Communications; 2009–2013 | Succeeded by Linda Hofstad Helleland |
Party political offices
| Preceded by Dagfinn Høybråten | Leader of the Christian Democratic Party; 2011–2019 | Succeeded by Kjell Ingolf Ropstad |
| Preceded by Hans Olav Syversen | Christian Democratic Parliamentary Leader; 2013–2019 | Succeeded by Hans Fredrik Grøvan |
