= Jørund Rytman =

Norwegian politician

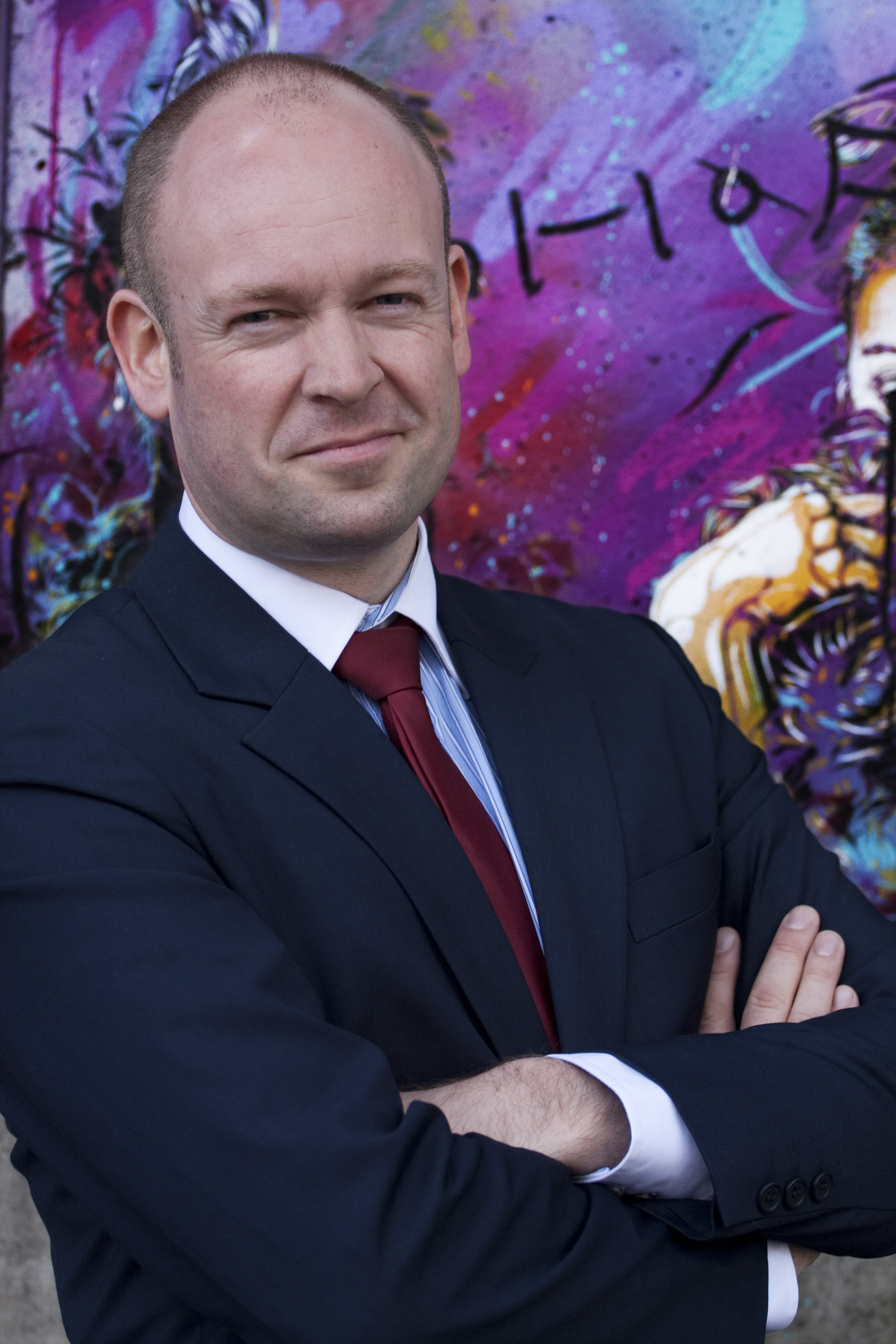
Rytman in 2011

Jørund Henning Rytman (born 4 May 1977) is a Norwegian politician from Buskerud who represented the Progress Party in the Storting from 2005 until 2017.

He was known as one of the most active supporters of Israel in the Norwegian parliament, and was chairman of Friends of Israel in the Parliament of Norway for two two-year periods. He is also associated with Friends of Estonia in the Parliament of Norway.

He is a Seventh-day Adventist, and considers himself a libertarian.

== Storting committees ==
- 2013–2017 member of the Business and Industry committee
- 2009–2013 member of the Finance and Economic Affairs committee
- 2005–2009 member of the Finance and Economic Affairs committee
