= Helen Bjørnøy =

Norwegian politician

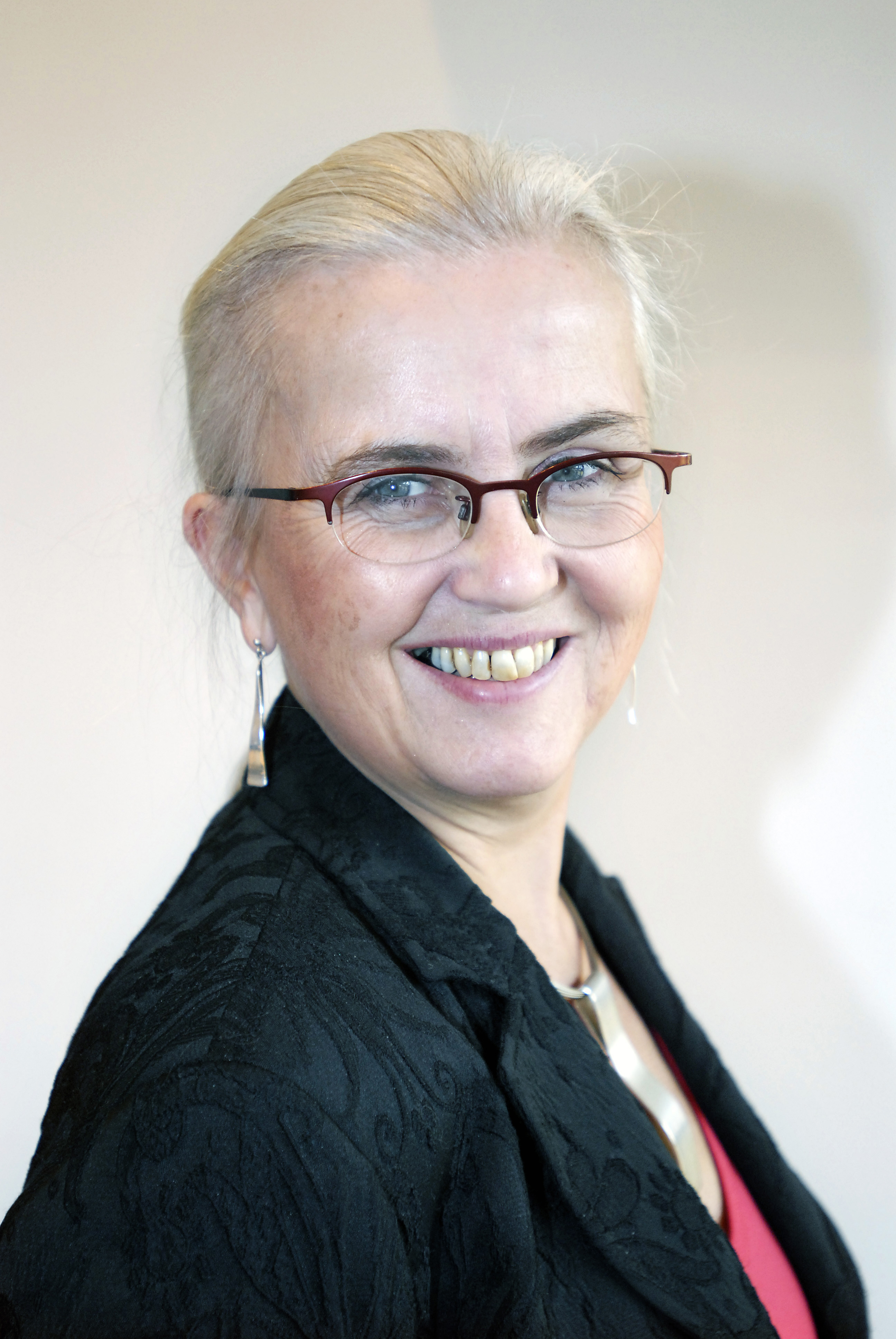

County Governor of Buskerud
- Incumbent
- Assumed office 1 October 2013
- Prime Minister: Jens Stoltenberg; Erna Solberg
- Preceded by: Kirsti Kolle Grøndahl

Minister of the Environment
- In office 17 October 2005 – 18 October 2007
- Prime Minister: Jens Stoltenberg
- Preceded by: Knut Arild Hareide
- Succeeded by: Erik Solheim

Personal details
- Born: Helen Oddveig Bjørnøy; 18 February 1954 (age 72) Ålesund, Norway
- Party: Socialist Left Party
- Spouse: Torstein Lalim
- Children: 4
- Occupation: Priest; Politician

Helen Oddveig Bjørnøy (born 18 February 1954 in Ålesund, Norway) is a Norwegian Lutheran minister and politician (Socialist Left Party), currently County Governor of Buskerud. From October 2005 to October 2007, she was Minister of the Environment in the Red-Green Coalition cabinet headed by Jens Stoltenberg. On 18 October 2007 she was relieved from her duties in the government and replaced by Erik Solheim (Socialist Left Party).

== Biography ==
Bjørnøy graduated from MF Norwegian School of Theology in 1980 and was ordained a minister in the Church of Norway the same year. She held a teaching position as assistant professor in the field of Ethics at Lovisenberg Deaconal University College from 1991 to 1999. Her last position before entering into government was Secretary General for the Church City Mission, Kirkens Bymisjon (1999–2005).

Bjørnøy suffered an illness in 2016, taking an indefinite leave as Buskerud's County Governor. In 2020, she was one of those who called for further review of a new biolaw being proposed in Norway. She has advocated for the recognition of children's rights and the protection of the female body.

Bjørnøy is married to Tortein Lalim.

Political offices
Preceded by Knut Arild Hareide	Norwegian Minister of the Environment; 2005–2007	Succeeded by Erik Solheim
Civic offices
Preceded by Kirsti Kolle Grøndahl	County Governor of Buskerud; 2013–present	Incumbent
