= Helitrans =

Norwegian helicopter operator

IATA	ICAO	Call sign
9I	HTA	HELIDRIFT
- Founded: 1990
- Hubs: Trondheim Airport, Værnes
- Fleet size: 22
- Headquarters: Stjørdal, Norway
- Key people: Richard Simsonsen (CEO)
- Website: https://www.helitrans.no

Helitrans is a Norwegian helicopter and maintenance company based at Trondheim Airport, Værnes established in 1990. The airline also has bases in Lillestrøm Kjeller Airport, Ås Municipality, Mo i Rana Airport, Røssvoll, Narvik, Langnes Airport, Alta Airport, Stavanger Airport, Ljosland, and Sauda in Norway.

The airline offers services within construction, fire fighting, charter and sightseeing, surveillance exercises and other areas.

In April 2010, Helitrans received approval to fly to London City Airport, in the business center of London, one of Europe's most demanding airports.

== History ==
The company started helicopter services from Trondheim Airport in 1990 providing general services, including work for mobile telephone network operators, power grid operators and reindeer farmers. In 1997 the company started a fixed-wing division, with a Dornier Do-228. Services included charter flights from Trondheim Airport with Rosenborg BK and with Statoil to Brønnøysund. The fixed-wing division was sold to Kato Airline in 1998.

In 2004 Helitrans made two large purchases: the aerial photography company Fjellanger Widerøe and the domestic division of NorCopter. Later they also have bought the Swedish aircraft maintenance company Air Service Torsby based at Torsby Airport and the Ålesund Airport, Vigra based airline Classic Norway Air that operated a BAe Jetstream 31.

In 2007 Helitrans purchased HelikopterDrift AS, a helicopter company based in Kjeller Airport, Lillestrøm, and later merged into Helitrans AS in 2011.

In December 2012 Helitrans ended the fixed wing operation and continued to only operate helicopters.

In 2016 Investor Oddvar Røysi buys 13 brand new Airbus-helicopter close to 300 million NOK, which he pays cash.

In march 2017 Investor Røysi Invest buys Helitrans from BOA

February 27, 2018 – Kopter is proud to announce the signature of a firm contract for twelve units plus six options with Helitrans AS, one of Norway’s largest helicopter operators.

May 2019 Helitrans has taken delivery of two Airbus H125 helicopters with digital logcards, becoming the first H125 operator able to manage the maintenance history of its aircraft components digitally, resulting in better data quality, time savings, and simpler processes, thereby reinforcing flight safety.

On 31 August 2019, an Airbus AS350 operated by a contracted Helitrans worker crashed in the mountains of Skoddevarre in Alta Municipality, Norway, during a sightseeing tour, killing all 6 occupants.

In June of 2021, the board of Helitrans appointed Ole Christian Melhus as acting CEO.

== Fleet ==
As of August 2021:

Helicopters:

- 1 Bell 205
- 24 Airbus Helicopters H125

== Financials ==
In 2014, Helitrans had an annual revenue of NOK 90 million ($10,785,160 USD), with a net profit of $409,000 USD.

In 2018, Helitrans had an annual revenue of NOK 248 million.
