= Solveig Vitanza =

Norwegian politician

Member of the Storting
- Incumbent
- Assumed office 1 October 2025
- Constituency: Østfold

Deputy Member of the Storting
- In office 1 October 2021 – 30 September 2025
- Deputising for: Jon-Ivar Nygård (2021–2025)
- Constituency: Østfold

Personal details
- Born: 10 July 1982 (age 44)
- Party: Labour
- Education: University of Oslo
- Occupation: Research advisor Politician

Solveig Vitanza (born 10 July 1982) is a Norwegian research advisor and politician for the Labour Party.

== Biography ==
Vitanza was elected deputy representative to the Storting from the constituency of Østfold for the period 2021–2025, for the Labour Party. She was meeting for Jon-Ivar Nygård in the Storting from 2021 while Nygård is minister of transport. After the 2025 election, she was elected as a regular member of the Storting, securing her own seat rather than being an active meeting deputy member. In the Storting, she is a member of the Standing Committee on Business and Industry for both the 2021–2025 period and the ongoing period of 2025–2029.

Vitanza hails from Halden, and has been member of the municipal council of Halden since 2019. She is educated from the University of Oslo, and has worked as research advisor at the Østfold University College.
