= Friends of Palestine in the Parliament of Norway =

Pro-Palestine caucus group

Friends of Palestine in the Parliament of Norway (Norwegian: Palestinas Venner på Stortinget) is a pro-Palestine caucus group consisting of members of the Parliament of Norway (Stortinget).

The initiative to form the group was taken in late 2007, and was modelled after the pro-Israel group Israels Venner på Stortinget. After the 2009 election, the group convened. Torbjørn Røe Isaksen joined the groups for support of both Israel and Palestine, and was the only member from a non-socialist party. The leader of Palestinas Venner is Anette Trettebergstuen. After the 2009 election the group had 29 members.

== Present members (2013–2017) ==
As of August 2014, the Friends of Palestine have a total of 23 members, 19 (of 55) from the Labour Party (Ap) and 4 (of 7) from the Socialist Left Party (SV).

- Audun Lysbakken (SV)
- Snorre Valen (SV)
- Karin Andersen (SV)
- Bård Vegard Solhjell (SV)
- Eva Kristin Hansen (Ap)
- Åsmund Aukrust (Ap)
- Sverre Myrli (Ap)
- Lise Christoffersen (Ap)
- Ruth Grung (Ap)
- Torstein Tvedt Solberg (Ap)
- Freddy de Ruiter (Ap)
- Anna Ljunggren (Ap)
- Kari Henriksen (Ap)
- Sonja Mandt (Ap)
- Stine Renate Håheim (Ap)
- Eirin Sund (Ap)
- Truls Wickholm (Ap)
- Jette Christensen (Ap)
- Anette Trettebergstuen (Ap)
- Karianne Tung (Ap)
- Ingrid Heggø (Ap)
- Lene Vågslid (Ap)
- Martin Henriksen (Ap)

Two members, Kari Henriksen and Sverre Myrli (both Ap) were also members of Friends of Israel.
