= Ronny Aukrust =

Norwegian politician (born 1975)

Deputy Member of the Storting
- Incumbent
- Assumed office 1 October 2025
- Deputising for: Jon-Ivar Nygård (2025–2026)
- Constituency: Østfold

Personal details
- Born: 20 October 1975 (age 50) Kråkstad, Norway
- Party: Labour Party
- Children: 4
- Education: Merkantilt Institutt

Ronny Holen Aukrust (born 20 October 1975) is a Norwegian politician and deputy member of the Storting. A member of the Labour Party, he represented Østfold between October 2025 and September 2026.

== Early life ==
Aukrust was born on 20 October 1975 in Kråkstad. The family moved to Askim in 1977, where Aukrust has lived ever since. He went to primary school in Korsgård and junior high school in Løken. Aukrust was a blårussen and studied commerce and office management at Mysen Upper Secondary School in Mysen. He studied accounting at the Merkantilt Institutt in Oslo.

== Career ==
After school, Aukrust worked as an accountant before joining software company Visma in 2002.

=== Politics ===
Aukrust joined the Labour Party in 2017. He is leader of the Labour Party in Indre Østfold and a member of the local municipal council. He was leader of the commuter association in Indre Østfold. He was the Labour Party's fifth placed candidate in Østfold at the 2025 parliamentary election, but the party won only four seats in the constituency. Aukrust became the party's first deputy representative (Vararepresentant) in the constituency. He entered the Storting on 1 October 2025 as a permanent substitute for Jon-Ivar Nygård until 11 September 2026 while Nygård served as Minister of Transport. He was a member of the Standing Committee on Scrutiny and Constitutional Affairs and was also elected by the Storing to be a part of the Norwegian delegation to the Nordic Council.

== Personal life ==
Aukrust has four children.
