= Kvenvik =

Village in Alta Municipality, Norway

Kvenvik (Norwegian); Šuovošluovta (Northern Sami); Suislahti (Kven)
- Village
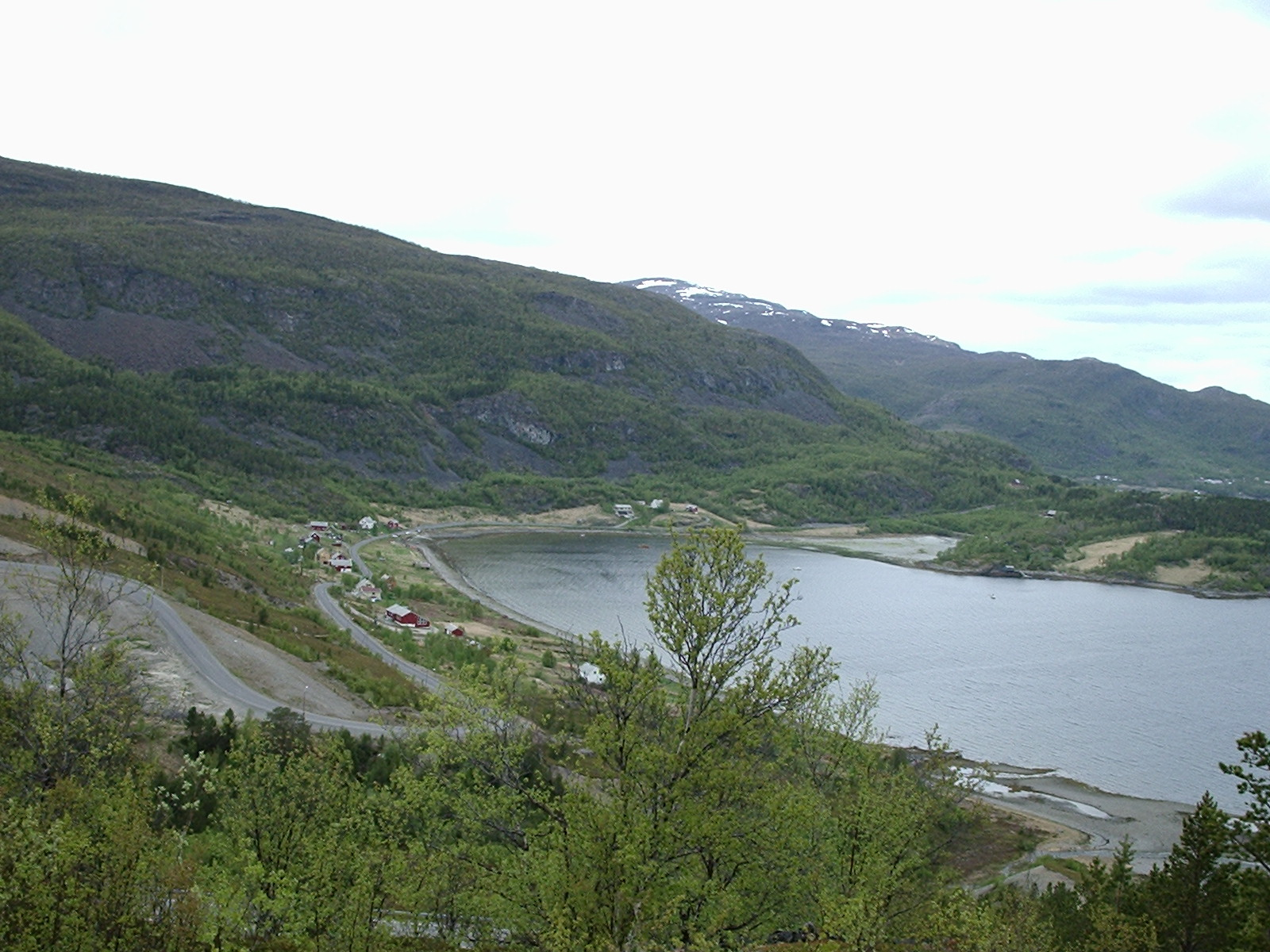
- View of the village
- Interactive map of: Kvenvik (Norwegian); Šuovošluovta (Northern Sami); Suislahti (Kven)
- Location within Finnmark Location within Norway
- Coordinates: 69°55′37″N 23°06′17″E
- Country: Norway
- Region: Northern Norway
- County: Finnmark
- District: Vest-Finnmark
- Municipality: Alta Municipality
- Elevation: 68 m (223 ft)
- Time zone: UTC+01:00 (CET)
  - Summer (DST): UTC+02:00 (CEST)
- Post Code: 9518 Alta

Kvenvik (Norwegian), Šuovošluovta (Northern Sami), or Suislahti (Kven) is a village in Alta Municipality in Finnmark county, Norway. It is located in an inlet on the inner part of the Altafjorden, about 10 kilometres (6.2 mi) from the town of Alta. It had a population (2012) of 194.

On 31 August 2019, a sightseeing helicopter crashed in the mountains of Skoddevarre, just south of Kvenvik.
