= Jon Lilletun =

Norwegian politician

Minister of Education and Research
- In office 17 October 1997 – 17 March 2000
- Prime Minister: Kjell Magne Bondevik
- Preceded by: Reidar Sandal
- Succeeded by: Trond Giske

Member of the Norwegian Parliament
- In office 1 October 1989 – 2 May 2005
- Constituency: Vest-Agder

Vice President of the Odelsting
- In office 10 October 2005 – 21 August 2006
- President: Inge Lønning
- Preceded by: Odd Holten
- Succeeded by: Ola T. Lånke

Personal details
- Born: 23 October 1945 Vossestrand Municipality, Norway
- Died: 21 August 2006 (aged 60) Oslo, Norway
- Party: Christian Democratic Party

Jon Lilletun (23 October 1945 – 21 August 2006) was a Norwegian politician active in the Christian Democratic Party.

== Background ==
Lilletun was born in the western part of Vossestrand Municipality, now a part of Voss Municipality. His father owned a farm and also worked as a mailman. Lilletun was raised as a Pentecostal, and his family always tithed to the religious community.

After his mandatory 8-year primary education, Lilletun's family was unable to finance attendance at a higher level of school with an academic track. Lilletun worked as an apprentice at a local merchant and attended various trade schools. In 1974, he opened his own retail store that went bankrupt within a few years. He was subsequently convicted of negligence in his accounting practices and sentenced to a 55-day prison term, which he served.

He attributed this experience with a new outlook on life, and from 1975 to 1988 he worked for Vennesla Municipality on issues related to youth. In 1982, he ran for election as the mayor of Vennesla Municipality, but lost in a landslide defeat. During this time he also moved from the Pentecostal movement to the Church of Norway.

He died of cancer in 2006.

== Political career ==
Representing the county of Vest-Agder, he served as a deputy member of the Norwegian parliament from 1981 to 1985, and as an elected member from 1989 until his death. In the spring of 2005 he took sick leave, and his deputy Sigmund Kroslid filled in for him. After his death he was replaced by Dagrun Eriksen.

Lilletun was the Minister of Education, Research and Church Affairs 1997–2000, in the first cabinet of Kjell Magne Bondevik. Under his administration, the Norwegian Center for Studies of Holocaust and Religious Minorities was approved.

Among his other parliamentary appointments were:

=== Storting Committees ===
- Since 2001: member of the Standing Committee on Foreign Affairs and the Enlarged Foreign Affairs Committee
- 2000-2001: member of the Standing Committee on Business and Industry
- 1993-1997: chair of the Standing Committee on Education, Research and Church Affairs
- 1990-1993: member of the Standing Committee on Church and Education
- 1989-1990: member of the Standing Committee on Local Government and the Environment

=== Other ===
- Since 2001: member of the Norwegian delegation for Relations with the European Parliament
- Since 2000: member of the Norwegian delegation to the NATO Parliamentary Assembly, Deputy Head of the delegation since 2001
- 1993-1997: alternate member of the Storting delegation to the Nordic Council
- 2001-2005: chair of the Christian Democratic Party parliamentary group

Since 2005, he was also vice president of the Lagting.
