= Hans Olav Syversen =

Norwegian politician (born 1966)

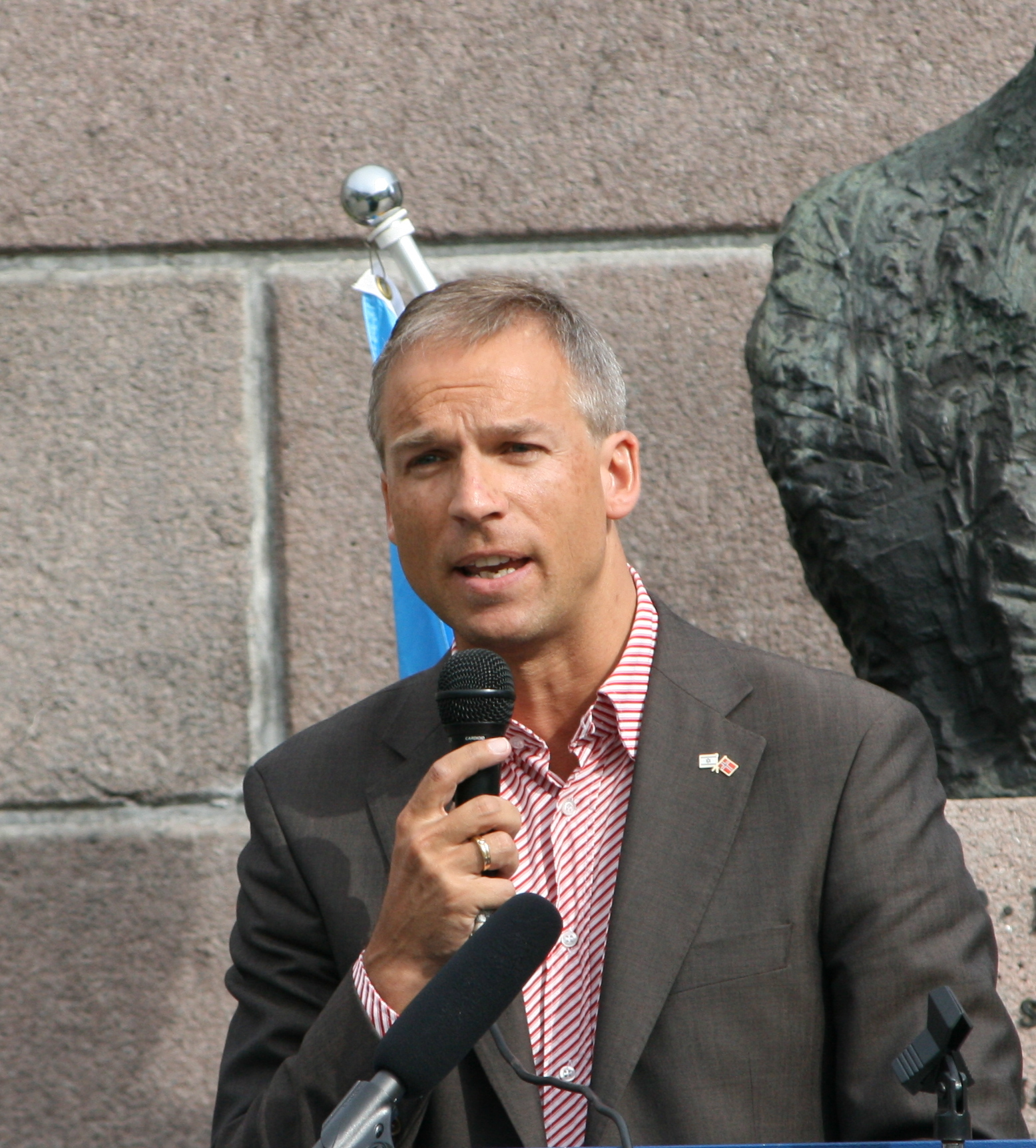

Member of the Norwegian Parliament
- In office 1 October 2005 – 30 September 2017
- Constituency: Oslo

Christian Democratic Parliamentary Leader
- In office 28 April 2011 – 16 October 2013
- Leader: Knut Arild Hareide
- Preceded by: Dagfinn Høybråten
- Succeeded by: Knut Arild Hareide

Personal details
- Born: 25 November 1966 (age 58); Skjervøy, Troms, Norway
- Political party: Christian Democratic Party

Hans Olav Syversen (born 25 November 1966 in Skjervøy) is a Norwegian politician for the Christian Democratic Party.

He was first elected to the Norwegian Parliament from Oslo in 2005, serving until 2017. He previously served as a deputy representative to the Norwegian Parliament during the term 1989–1993.

During the first cabinet Bondevik, Syversen was appointed political advisor in the Ministry of Justice and the Police. He left the position in 1999. In 2003, during the second cabinet Bondevik, he was appointed State Secretary in the Ministry of Children and Family Affairs.

On the local level he was a member of Oslo city council from 1995 to 2003, being city administrative councillor (kommunalråd) since 1999. He was a member of the central party board from 1997 to 1999.

He graduated with the cand.jur. degree from the University of Oslo in 2000. He has been involved in the European Movement, and in 2009 became chairman of Friends of Israel in the Parliament of Norway for a two-year period.
