= Skoddevarre =

Mountain in Norway

- Skoađđovárri
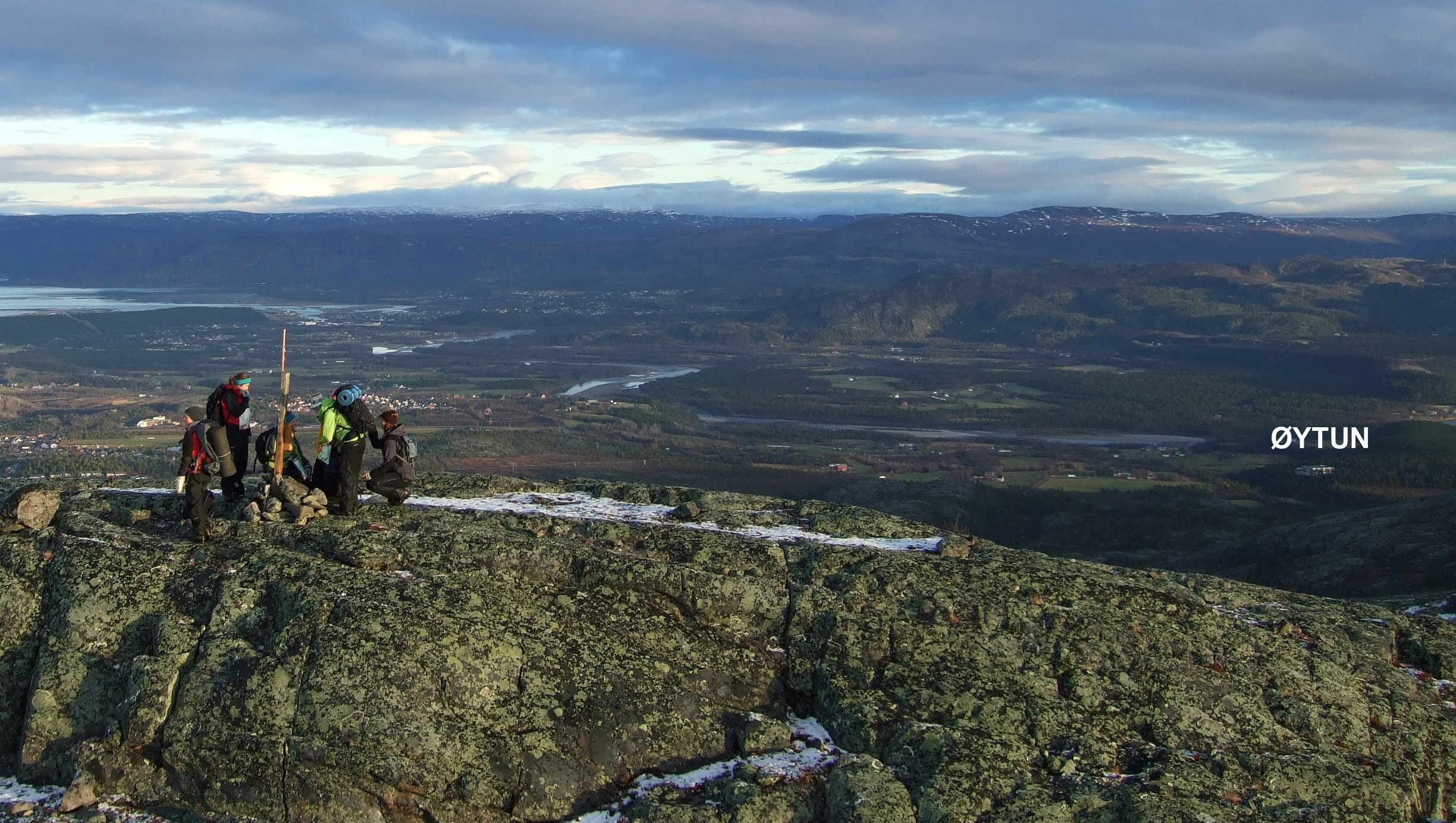
- View from the peak of Skoddevarre towards Alta.

Highest point
- Elevation: 435.4 m (1,428 ft)
- Coordinates: 69°56′09″N 23°08′45″E

Geography
- Location within Norway
- Location: Alta, Finnmark, Norway

Skoddevarre (Northern Sami: Skoađđovárri) is a mountain in Alta Municipality in Finnmark county, Norway. The mountain has several peaks, the tallest of which is located in the east, reaching 435.4 metres (1,428 ft) above sea level. The Great Norwegian Encyclopedia states that the highest peak is 434 metres (1,424 ft) and is located in the north. Nearby settlements include the village of Kvenvik northwest of the mountain and the town of Alta to the northeast. The European route E6 runs north of the mountain between the settlements. The west wall at Skoddevarre is 200 metres (660 ft) high and is used for rock climbing. The bedrock consists of sandstone and greenschist. The "Gubben" formation is a pinnacle in the middle of the rock.

On 31 August 2019, the mountain was the site of a helicopter crash that killed six people. A memorial is located at the crash site, which was built a year after the accident.

== See also ==
- 2019 Alta helicopter crash
