= Norwegian Safety Investigation Authority =

Government agency of Norway

- Statens havarikommisjon

Agency overview
- Formed: 1 January 1989 (37 years ago)
- Preceding agencies: Aviation Accident Commission; Institute of Maritime Enquiry
- Type: Government agency
- Jurisdiction: Government of Norway
- Headquarters: Lillestrøm, Norway; 59.96772°N 11.03623°E
- Parent department: Ministry of Transport
- Website: havarikommisjonen.no

The Norwegian Safety Investigation Authority (NSIA; Norwegian: Statens havarikommisjon, SHK) is the government agency responsible for investigating transport-related accidents within Norway. Specifically, it investigates aviation accidents and incidents, rail accidents, maritime accidents, select traffic accidents, and serious incidents in the defence sector.

All investigations aim to find underlying causes and to improve safety; criminal investigation is not part of AIBN's mandate. Subordinate to the Ministry of Transport, the agency is located in Lillestrøm.

Traditionally marine accidents were investigated Institute of Maritime Enquiry, which mixed safety investigation, criminal and civil liability into a combined investigation. Aviation accidents and major rail accidents were investigated by ad hoc commissions. The Accident Investigation Board for Civil Aviation was established as a permanent organization on 1 January 1989, originally based at Oslo Airport, Fornebu. From 2002 it also took over investigating rail accidents, road accidents were included in 2005, marine accidents from 2008 and finally defense sector accidents in 2020.

== History ==
=== Former commissions ===
Traditionally, marine accident investigation was carried out by the Institute of Maritime Enquiry (Sjøforklaringsinstituttet) and the Permanent Investigation Board for Special Accidents in the Fisheries Fleet. This system centered around mandatory inquiries carried out by a district court. In exceptional cases the Norwegian government had the jurisdiction to appoint an ad hoc investigation board.

At the time of Norway's first major civilian aviation accident, the Havørn accident on 16 June 1936, no particular routine existed for investigating aviation accidents. An ad hoc commission was established at the scene to investigate it, consisting of Chief of Police Alf Reksten, Sheriff Kaare Bredvik, the Norwegian Air Lines' technical director Bernt Balchen, Captain Eckhoff of the aviation authorities, and Gjermundson from the insurance company.

A similar organization took place from 1945 to 1956, where the government appointed an accident investigation commission for each accident and incident. These commissions had no permanent organization or members and were appointed for each accident on an ad hoc basis. Its members normally consisted of staff from the Norwegian Air Traffic and Airport Management and the Royal Norwegian Air Force. In addition, it had representatives from the Norwegian Police Service and the Norwegian Prosecuting Authority.

From 1956, a permanent secretariat was appointed, the Aviation Accident Commission (Flyhavarikommisjonen), but the various commissions members were only tied to the commission during the period of the investigation. By the 1980s, this had increased to two full-time technicians and a clerk. This period had accident commissions with a significantly different mission from later. Firstly, it only investigated actual accidents of a certain size. General-aviation accidents and near accidents were not investigated. Secondly, the commissions were both given the task to uncover the cause of the accident from a safety point of view, but also to uncover any criminal occurrences. This was the reason for including police and prosecution officials in the commissions.

Within the railway sector, accident investigation had been carried out by the Norwegian State Railways and its successors, the Norwegian National Rail Administration and the Norwegian State Railways. Major accidents were thereby investigated by in-house commissions with the potential for conflicts of interest, or through ad hoc committees appointed by the government. Similar to marine accidents, it was ultimately a subjective call by the Ministry of Transport and Communications to make the call for if a committee were needed.

=== Establishment ===
During the 1980s, a shift occurred in the view of aviation accident commissions, and by 1988, the Ministry of Transport and Communications launched a specific proposal to create a permanent agency responsible for aviation accident and incident investigation. This followed changes to international law according to regulations set down by the International Civil Aviation Organization. The ministry primarily stressed the mix of criminal and safety preventative as contrary to international law, as well as near-accidents being investigated by NATAM. Secondary concerns were that since the commission members were part-time employees, investigations would drag on unnecessarily, as freeing up the members from the regular jobs was often difficult. The investigators also often arrived late at the scene of the crime due to these conditions. One alternative proposal was to make the commission part of the Civil Aviation Authority of Norway, although this never materialized as the latter was not created until later.

The legal framework took effect on 1 January 1989, and the same day, the Accident Investigation Board for Civil Aviation (Havarikommisjonen for sivil luftfart) was established. In its primordial form it was organized as an office within the Ministry of Transport and Communications. Its first director was Ragnar Rygnestad, which had been the former commission's secretary for ten years. The board soon received five employees. The legal changes meant that near-accidents were also investigated, significantly increasing the number of cases to be handled. By June, the agency still did not have sufficient staff to handle all cases, and in particular had not yet implemented human behavior and psychological expertise. It was initially based at Villa Hareløkka on the premises of Oslo Airport, Fornebu in Bærum. In addition, it used a military hangar at Kjeller Airport to store and reconstruct aircraft parts.

The board was reorganized from 1 July 1999, when it was split out of the ministry and became an independent government agency. By then, the agency had 15 employees. Oslo Airport, Fornebu was closed down 1998, so the board was forced to move from its premises. The board subsequently relocated to a temporary site on the premises of Kjeller Airport in Skedsmo. A new, tailor-made structure was opened within the military perimeter of the airport in May 2001. Designed by Knut Longva, it features both offices and a hangar measuring 24 by 25 m (79 by 82 ft).

=== Rail and road ===
Meanwhile, the government started looking at expanding the agency's role. While these commissions had technical competence, their transient nature caused them to not be sufficient methodological in their investigations. Creating a permanent staff and a larger specialist environment was seen as a way to allow for better investigation and reporting. Particularly two accidents were pinnacle to this move, the sinking of MS Sleipner and the Åsta accident, which killed 16 and 19 people, respectively. Although the government wanted to include all modes of transport, legal and practical reasons caused the railway sector to be the first to be included.

The agency took over responsibility for investigating railway accidents from 1 January 2002. It simultaneously took the name Accident Investigation Board for Civil Aviation and Railways (Havarikommisjonen for sivil luftfart og jernbane, HSLB). At the time, the agency investigated about 100 to 150 aviation accidents and incidents per year and about 60 railway accidents and incidents per year.

The next expansion involved road traffic accidents, taking effect on 1 September 2005. Unlike in aviation and railway accidents, only a select few road accidents were to be investigated. These were selected based on their ability to provide useful information to improve road safety. In particular bus and truck accidents were prioritized, along with tunnel accidents and ones with dangerous goods. The agency initially hired four investigations and aimed at them investigating twenty to twenty-five accidents per year. This comprised 3.4 million Norwegian krone of the agency's 31.8 million budget. One advantage of the agency was that it could allow for protected testimonies, without these having to be subject to criminal investigation by the Norwegian Police Service. The agency thereby took its current name. Meanwhile, the Norwegian Public Roads Administration established a group of regional offices to investigate other accidents and aggregate information from these.

During this period, discussions also arose as to whether the board should investigate cases related to pipelines and accidents on oil platforms. This discussion came from the mandate of the United States' National Transportation Safety Board, which had such authority.

=== Marine expansion ===
In particular, the investigations of MS Scandinavian Star, MS Estonia, and MS Jan Heweliusz during the 1990s caused a questioning of the quality of marine accident investigations, and the other Nordic countries established marine investigation boards during that decade. Work on reforming the marine system started in 1998, and resulted in a committee recommending the system be scrapped in favor of an accident investigation board. The prime reason was that the Institute of Maritime Enquiry was regarded as having insufficient competence to investigate major accidents. Also, some concerns were that the system mixed the criminal prosecution and the safety investigation aspects, which could hinder a proper learning to take place from an accident. The system used court interviews with witnesses, while owners, insurance companies, and press were present. Facing both legal and economic consequences, witnesses would often give testimonies of reduced accuracy, hindering proper investigation from a safety point of view.

Initially, the committee proposed an independent investigation board for the maritime sector, either as part of the Norwegian Maritime Authority or as an independent agency subordinate to the Ministry of Justice. During the political discussions a joint board was favored instead. Parliament approved the new jurisdiction in 2004. However, it took four years to implement the decision, and nine years from the conclusions of the committee were presented. The delays were caused by the legal implications and complexity of the investigations. Because the board was only to investigate from a safety point of view, a new legal and administrative framework had to be implemented to ensure that the Norwegian Police Service could take over the responsibility for criminal investigation of the marine accidents.

The changes took effect on 1 July 2008. In addition to the investigation aspect, which was issued to the board, the Maritime Authority established a division to work with strategic safety. Criminal investigation of marine accidents became the responsibility of an office at Rogaland Police District.

=== Defense sector expansion ===
In July 2019, the Norwegian government announced that the AIBN would merge with the Defense Accident Investigation Board Norway (DAIBN) in 2020. The AIBN would take over the work of the DAIBN on 1 July 2020 under the new name Norwegian Safety Investigation Authority (NSIA; Norwegian: Statens havarikommisjon (SHK)).

== Mandate ==
The Accident Investigation Board Norway is a government agency subordinate to the Ministry of Transport and Communications. In questions related to maritime safety, it reports to the Ministry of Trade, Industry, and Fisheries. Neither ministry can instruct the board in professional matters. The agency is mandated to investigate transport-related accidents and incident within the scope of aviation, maritime, rail transport, and road transport. The board's responsibility is to determine which accidents and incidents are to be investigated, and the scope and scale of any investigations. This is a trade-off between use of resources and the perceived safety benefits from further inquiries.

AIBN's goal is exclusively to look into the safety aspects of accidents, with the overall goal to uncover causes and the line of events so as to learn, improve safety, and hinder similar accidents from happening again. The board is not involved in any assessment of blame or liability, whether under criminal or civil law. Criminal investigation is carried out by the Norwegian Police Service and prosecution by the Norwegian Prosecuting Authority. In particular, the board can accept testimonies, which can remain anonymous and will under no circumstances be handed over to the police or prosecuting authorities. The board's responsibilities are delineated towards those of the Police Service and the Prosecution Authority, as well as those of the Civil Aviation Authority of Norway, the Norwegian Maritime Authority, the Norwegian Public Roads Administration, and the Norwegian Railway Authority.

Aviation accidents are mandated through the Aviation Act of 11 June 1993, which again references Council Directive 94/56/EC of 21 November 1994. This includes all aviation accidents, as well as serious incidents.

Marine accidents and incident investigation is based on the Norwegian Maritime Code of 24 June 1994. This is again based on obligationsand requirements stipulated under the International Convention for the Safety of Life at Sea. This includes all accidents with passenger ships and other large Norwegian vessels, in which people have or are assumed to have lost lives or been substantially injured. AIBN may also investigate foreign ships in cases where Norwegian jurisdiction can be applied under international law. AIBN may also investigate accidents with recreational boats if such an inquiry is presumed to improve safety at sea.

Rail accident and incident investigation has its legal basis in the Railway Investigation Act of 3 June 2005. This is again a national incorporation of the European Union's Railway Safety Directive 2004/49/EC. The responsibility includes both mainline railways, tramways and rapid transit, but not funiculars.

Road accident investigation is based on the Road Traffic Act of 18 June 1965. AIBN has no legal obligation to investigate any specific road accidents, although it is to be informed of any accidents involving buses and heavy trucks, and accidents in tunnels and those involving dangerous goods. AIBN then makes the call as to whether to investigate the matter, based on the assessment of if an investigation can further road traffic safety.
