= Norwegian Railway Authority =

Government agency

- Company type: Government agency
- Industry: Rail supervision
- Founded: 1996
- Headquarters: Oslo and Trondheim, Norway
- Area served: Norway
- Key people: Erik Ø. Reiersøl-Johnsen (Director)
- Number of employees: 62 (2014)
- Parent: Norwegian Ministry of Transport and Communications

The Norwegian Railway Authority (Norwegian: Statens jernbanetilsyn) is a Norwegian government agency responsible for practical control and supervision of rail transport in Norway, including railways, tramways, rapid transits, heritage railways and side tracks.

The agency was created on October 1, 1996, when the function was removed from the Norwegian State Railways. The inspectorate is subordinate to the Norwegian Ministry of Transport and Communications and is located in Oslo.

The Norwegian Railway Authority directs its efforts towards ensuring that rail traffic, cableways, fairgrounds and technical devices in amusement parks is operated in a safe and appropriate manner in the best interests of passengers/users, companies, employees and the general public.

The Authority is responsible for ensuring that rail operators meet the conditions and requirements set out in rail legislation that governs the traffic. The authority is also responsible for drawing up regulations, awarding licences for rail activity and approving rolling stock and infrastructure.
