= Norwegian Railway Directorate =

Norwegian government agency

Norwegian Railway Directorate logo

The Norwegian Railway Directorate (Norwegian: 'Jernbanedirektoratet', abbr.: JBD or JBDIR) is a government agency holding the strategic responsibility for the Norwegian railway network. It is formed on the basis of the railway reform and became operational on 1 January 2017. The directorate shall develop the railway as "an integrated transport system". Their mandate is to create "an efficient, safe and environmentally friendly railway network benefiting passengers and operators".

The reform privatised freight and passenger services, but not the infrastructure. Bane NOR will plan, build and maintain the infrastructure commissioned by the directorate. The directorate will manage the tenders for passenger transport services by specifying timetables and selecting bidders.
