= Bjartveit =

Bjartveit is a Norwegian surname. Notable people with the surname include:

- Eleonore Bjartveit (1924–2002), Norwegian politician, wife of Kjell
- Kjell Bjartveit (1927–2011), Norwegian physician and politician
