= Minister of Health and Care Services =

Norwegian cabinet position

Minister of Health and Care Services of Norway
- Helse- og omsorgsministeren

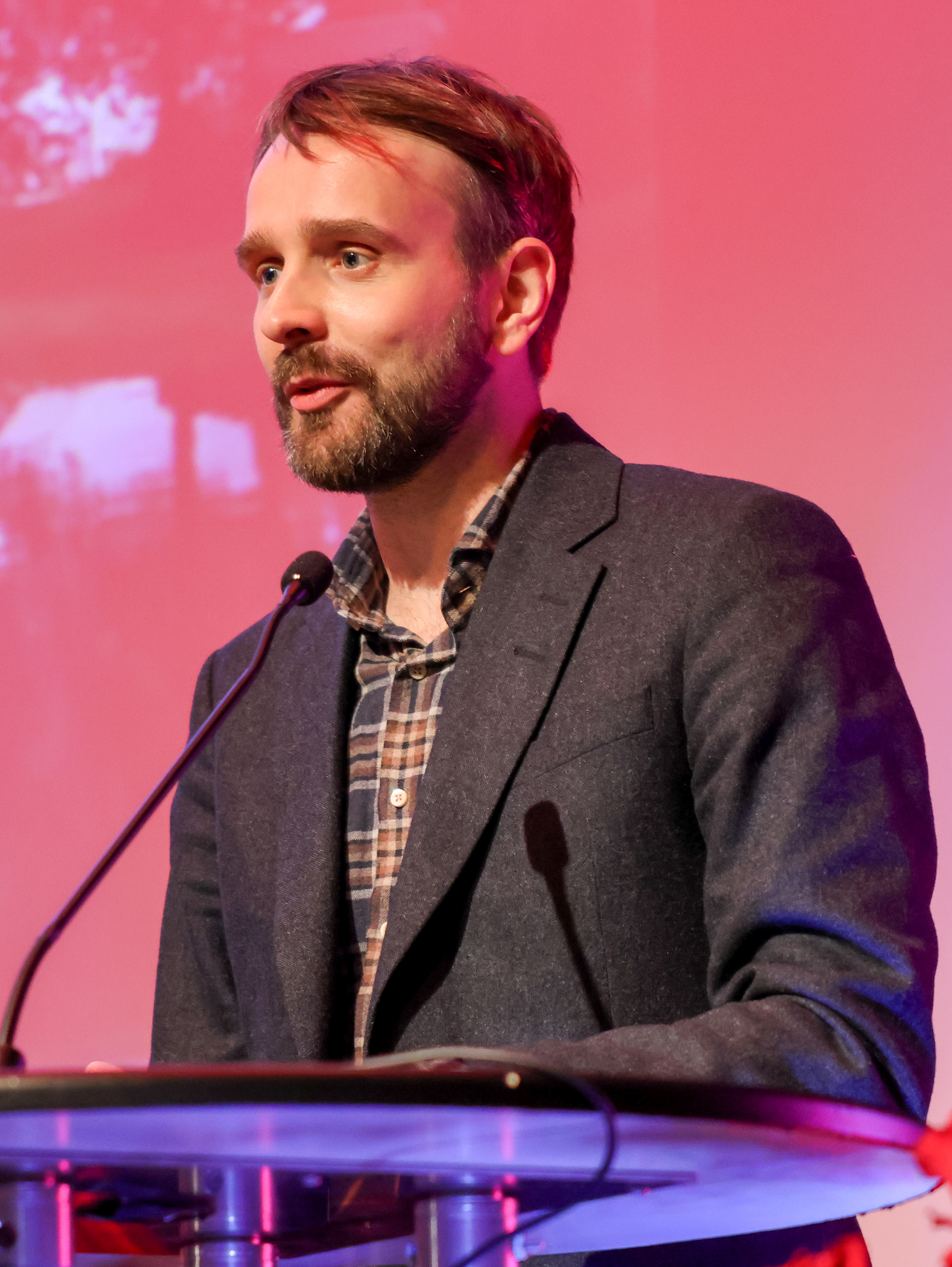
- Incumbent; Jan Christian Vestre since 19 April 2024
- Ministry of Health and Care Services
- Member of: Council of State
- Seat: Oslo
- Nominator: Prime Minister
- Appointer: Monarch with approval of Parliament
- Term length: No fixed length
- Constituting instrument: Constitution of Norway
- Precursor: Minister of Social Affairs
- Formation: 4 September 1992
- First holder: Werner Christie
- Deputy: State secretaries at the Ministry of Health and Care Services
- Website: Official website

The Minister of Health and Care Services (Norwegian: Helse- og omsorgsministeren) is a councilor of state and chief of the Norway's Ministry of Health and Care Services. Since 19 April 2024 the position has been held by Jan Christian Vestre of the Labour Party. The ministry is responsible for healthcare and care services, with the state's healthcare activities being carried out by four regional health authorities. Major institutions subordinate to the ministry include the Directorate for Health, the Board of Health Supervision, the Institute of Public Health, the Medicines Agency, the Radiation Protection Authority, the Labour and Welfare Service and the Food Safety Authority.

The position was created in 1992 and originally held the healthcare portfolio of the Ministry of Social Affairs. The remainder of the ministry's portfolio was taken care of by the Minister of Social Affairs. From 2002 the position has been chief of its own ministry. The position has been held by eleven people from three parties. Bent Høie has held the position the longest, for a total of eight years.

== Key ==
The following lists the minister, their party, date of assuming and leaving office, their tenure in years and days, and the cabinet they served in.

Christian Democratic Party
Conservative Party
Labour Party

== Ministers ==
Photo	Name	Party	Took office	Left office	Tenure	Cabinet	Ref
	Werner Christie	Labour	4 September 1992	22 December 1995	3 years, 109 days	Brundtland III	
	Gudmund Hernes	Labour	22 December 1995	17 October 1997	1 year, 299 days	Brundtland III; Jagland	
	Dagfinn Høybråten	Christian Democratic	17 October 1997	17 March 2000	2 years, 152 days	Bondevik I	
	Tore Tønne	Labour	17 March 2000	19 October 2001	1 year, 216 days	Stoltenberg I	
	Dagfinn Høybråten	Christian Democratic	19 October 2001	18 June 2004	2 years, 243 days	Bondevik II	
	Ansgar Gabrielsen	Conservative	18 June 2004	17 October 2005	1 year, 121 days	Bondevik II	
	Sylvia Brustad	Labour	17 October 2005	20 June 2008	2 years, 247 days	Stoltenberg II	
	Bjarne Håkon Hanssen	Labour	20 June 2008	20 October 2009	1 year, 114 days	Stoltenberg II	
	Anne-Grete Strøm-Erichsen	Labour	20 October 2009	21 September 2012	2 years, 337 days	Stoltenberg II	
	Jonas Gahr Støre	Labour	21 September 2012	16 October 2013	1 year, 25 days	Stoltenberg II	
	Bent Høie	Conservative	16 October 2013	14 October 2021	7 years, 363 days	Solberg	
	Ingvild Kjerkol	Labour	14 October 2021	19 April 2024	2 years, 188 days	Støre	
	Jan Christian Vestre	Labour	19 April 2024	present	2 years, 141 days	Støre	

== Minister of the Elderly and Public Health ==
The Minister of the Elderly and Public Health was responsible for cases related to the elderly and public health. It was abolished on 24 January 2020.

Key
Progress Party

=== Ministers ===
Photo	Name	Party	Took office	Left office	Tenure	Cabinet	Ref
	Åse Michaelsen	Progress	17 January 2018	3 May 2019	1 year, 106 days	Solberg	
	Sylvi Listhaug	Progress	3 May 2019	18 December 2019	229 days	Solberg	
	Terje Søviknes	Progress	18 December 2019	24 January 2020	37 days	Solberg	
