= Minister of Children and Families =

Norwegian cabinet position

Minister of Children and Families of Norway
- Barne- og familieministeren

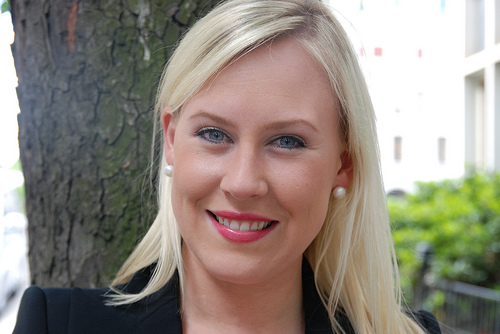
- Incumbent; Lene Vågslid since 4 February 2025
- Ministry of Children and Families
- Member of: Council of State
- Seat: Oslo
- Nominator: Prime Minister
- Appointer: Monarch with approval of Parliament
- Term length: No fixed length
- Constituting instrument: Constitution of Norway
- Precursor: Minister of the Interior
- Formation: 1 August 1955
- First holder: Aase Bjerkholt
- Deputy: State secretaries at the Children, Equality and Social Inclusion
- Website: Official website

The Minister of Children and Families (Norwegian: Barne- og familieministeren, Northern Sami: mánáid- ja bearašministtar) is a Councilor of State and Chief of Norway's Ministry of Children and Family Affairs. Since 4 February 2025, Lene Vågslid has held the position. The ministry is responsible for policy and public operations related to children, youth and families as well as consumer rights. Major agencies subordinate to the ministry include the Consumer Council and the Directorate for Children, Youth and Family Affairs.

The position was created as the Minister of Families and Consumer Affairs on 1 August 1955 as part of Gerhardsen's Third Cabinet. The Labour Party's Aase Bjerkholt as the inaugural minister. While at first a consultative minister, she received her own ministry on 21 December 1956. Sixteen people from four parties have held the position. It has been a favored position of the Christian Democratic Party, who have held it in all center-right governments they have participated in except during the four weeks of Lyng's Cabinet, when it was held by Karen Grønn-Hagen of the Centre Party. The minister position was discontinued on 8 May 1972, when the portfolio was transferred to the Minister of Consumer Affairs and Government Administration. The position was recreated under the original name on 16 October 1989 and occupied by Solveig Sollie of the Christian Democratic Party. When her successor Matz Sandman of the Labour Party took over the following year, it was renamed the Minister of Children and Family Affairs. With the appointment of Karita Bekkemellem (Labour) in 2005, the position changed name the Minister of Children and Equality, receiving responsibility for the government's anti-discrimination policies. She would be the first of six ministers during Stoltenberg's Second Cabinet, with the three last representing the Socialist Left Party. With these the position changed to its current name, but lost its responsibilities for kindergartens.

The position has been dominated by females—the only males to hold the position were Matz Sandman (Labour, 1990–91), Audun Lysbakken (Socialist Left, 2009–12) and Kjell Ingolf Ropstad (Christian Democratic, 2019–21). Manuela Ramin-Osmundsen (Labour) became the first non-white minister of Norway when she was appointed in 2007. Both she and Lysbakken were forced to resign after issues related to cronyism. Two people have held the position twice: Bjerkholdt and Karita Bekkemellem. With a tenure of ten years, Bjerkholdt has held the position the longest.

== Key ==
The following lists the minister, their party, date of assuming and leaving office, their tenure in years and days, and the cabinet they served in.

Centre Party
Christian Democratic Party
Conservative Party
Labour Party
Progress Party
Socialist Left Party

== Ministers ==
Photo	Name	Party	Took office	Left office	Tenure	Cabinet	Ref
	Aase Bjerkholt	Labour	1 August 1955	28 August 1963	8 years, 27 days	Gerhardsen III	
	Karen Grønn-Hagen	Centre	28 August 1963	25 September 1963	28 days	Lyng	
	Aase Bjerkholt	Labour	25 September 1963	12 October 1965	2 years, 17 days	Gerhardsen IV	
	Elsa Skjerven	Christian Democratic	12 October 1965	17 March 1971	5 years, 156 days	Borten	
	Inger Louise Valle	Labour	17 March 1971	18 October 1972	1 year, 215 days	Bratteli I	
	Solveig Sollie	Christian Democratic	16 October 1989	3 November 1990	1 year, 19 days	Syse	
	Matz Sandman	Labour	3 November 1990	15 November 1991	1 year, 12 days	Brundtland III	
	Grete Berget	Labour	15 November 1991	25 October 1996	4 years, 345 days	Brundtland III	
	Sylvia Brustad	Labour	25 October 1996	17 October 1997	357 days	Jagland	
	Valgerd Svarstad Haugland	Christian Democratic	17 October 1997	17 March 2000	2 years, 152 days	Bondevik I	
	Karita Bekkemellem	Labour	17 March 2000	19 October 2001	1 year, 216 days	Stoltenberg I	
	Laila Dåvøy	Christian Democratic	19 October 2001	17 October 2005	3 years, 363 days	Bondevik II	
	Karita Bekkemellem	Labour	17 October 2005	18 October 2007	2 years, 1 day	Stoltenberg II	
	Manuela Ramin-Osmundsen	Labour	18 October 2007	15 February 2008 (Note: Trond Giske was acting minister from 15 to 29 February.)	120 days	Stoltenberg II	
	Anniken Huitfeldt	Labour	29 February 2008	20 October 2009	1 year, 234 days	Stoltenberg II	
	Audun Lysbakken	Socialist Left	20 October 2009	5 March 2012 (Note: Kristin Halvorsen was acting minister from 5 to 23 March.)	2 years, 137 days	Stoltenberg II	
	Inga Marte Thorkildsen	Socialist Left	23 March 2012	16 October 2013	1 year, 207 days	Stoltenberg II	
	Solveig Horne	Progress	16 October 2013	17 January 2018	4 years, 93 days	Solberg	
	Linda Horstad Helleland	Conservative	17 January 2018	22 January 2019	1 year, 5 days	Solberg	
	Kjell Ingolf Ropstad	Christian Democratic	22 January 2019	20 September 2021	2 years, 241 days	Solberg	
	Olaug Bollestad	Christian Democratic	20 September 2021	14 October 2021	24 days	Solberg	
	Kjersti Toppe	Centre	14 October 2021	4 February 2025	3 years, 113 days	Støre	
	Lene Vågslid	Labour	4 February 2025	present	1 year, 215 days	Støre	
