= Astrid Søgnen =

Norwegian bureaucrat and politician

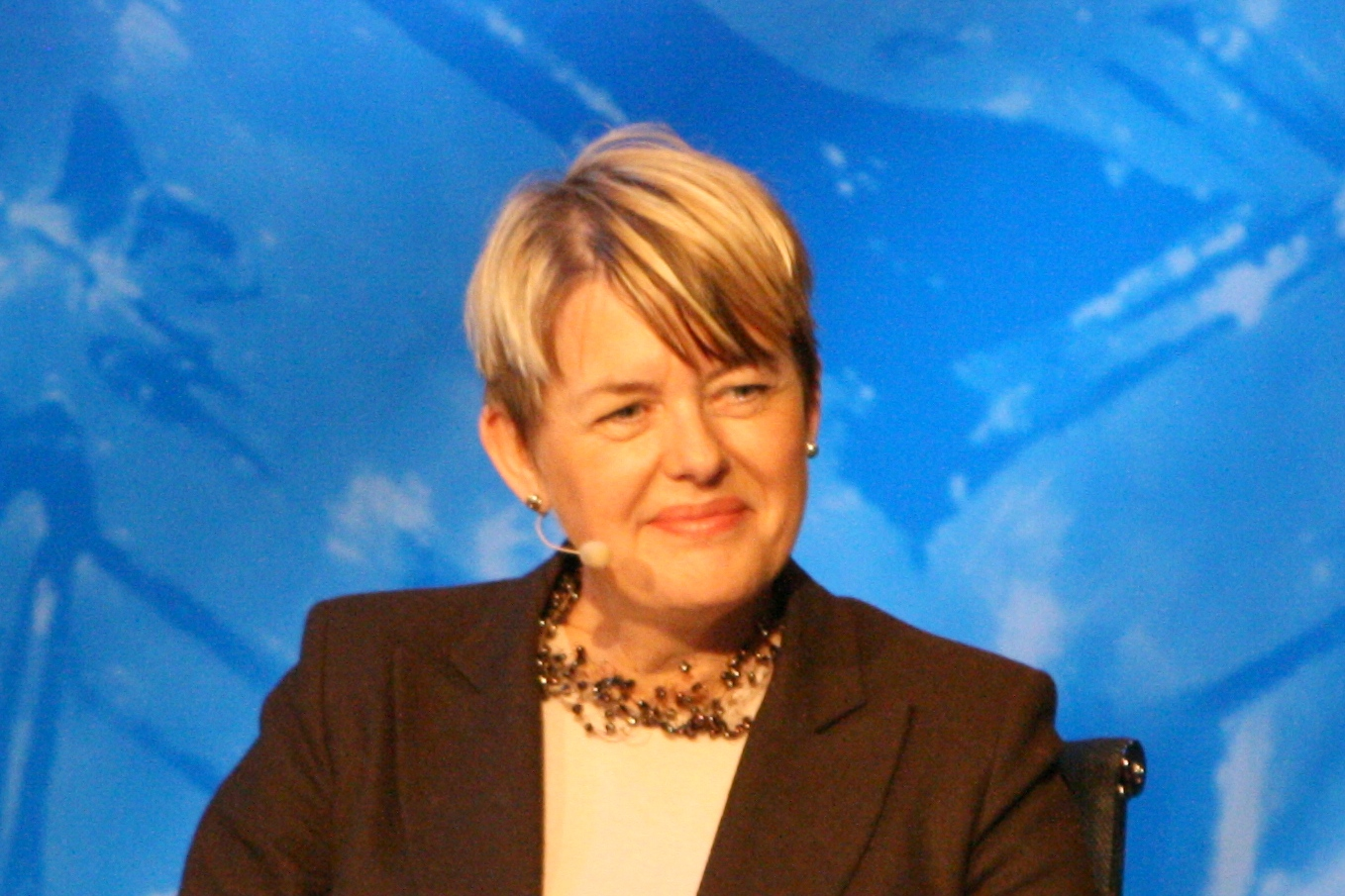
Astrid Søgnen

Astrid Olaug Søgnen (born 8 November 1951, in Gaular Municipality) is a Norwegian bureaucrat and politician for the Labour Party.

In 1995, during the third cabinet Brundtland, she was appointed state secretary in the Ministry of Education, Research and Church Affairs. She held this position throughout the cabinet Jagland, but lost her job when it fell in 1997.

A cand.philol. by education, Søgnen originally worked as a school teacher. From 1987 to 2000 she was assisting director of education in Akershus County Municipality. In 2000 she took over as director of the Education Agency (Utdanningsetaten) in Oslo.
