= Grete Berget =

Norwegian politician (1954–2017)

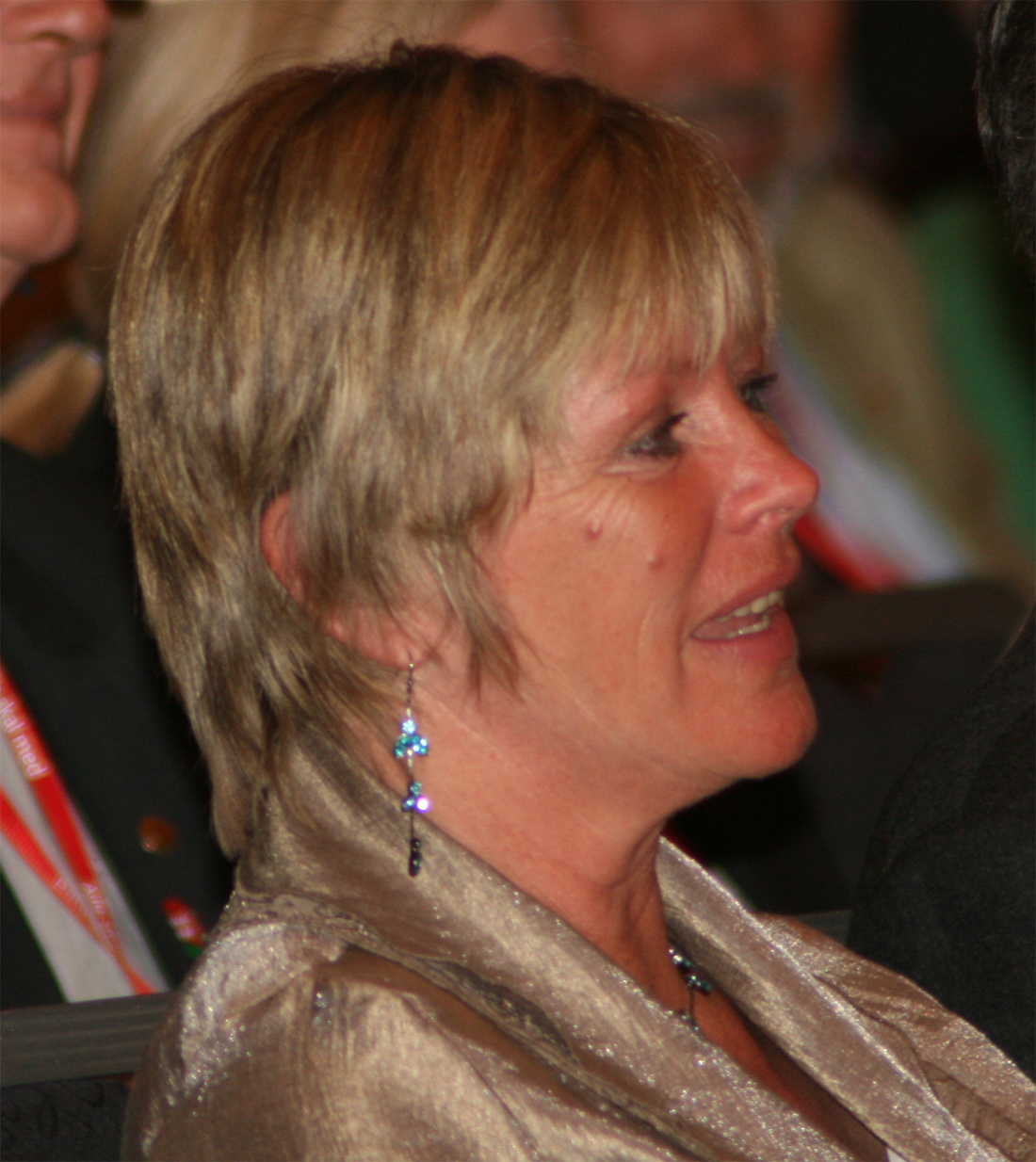
Grete Berget (2009)

Grete Anni Berget (25 March 1954 – 9 November 2017) was a Norwegian politician for the Labour Party. She was born in Vinstra in Nord-Fron Municipality, Oppland county. She worked as a journalist in her early career. Berget was private advisor to the Prime Minister 1990 – 1991, and Minister of Children and Family Affairs 1991 – 1996. From 2003 she was secretary general of the Norwegian European Movement. Berget died from cancer on 9 November 2017.

Political offices
Preceded by Matz Sandman	Norwegian Minister of Children and Families; 1991–1996	Succeeded by Sylvia Brustad
