= Bendik Rugaas =

Norwegian librarian and politician (1942–2025)

Minister of Administration and Planning
- In office 29 November 1996 – 17 October 1997
- Prime Minister: Thorbjørn Jagland
- Preceded by: Terje Rød-Larsen
- Succeeded by: Eldbjørg Løwer

Personal details
- Born: Bendik Jørgen Rugaas; 31 December 1942 Sør-Varanger, German-occupied Norway
- Died: 5 May 2025 (aged 82)
- Party: Labour

Bendik Jørgen Rugaas (31 December 1942 – 5 May 2025) was a Norwegian librarian and politician for the Norwegian Labour Party. Rugaas was Minister of Planning from 1996 to 1997 as part of the cabinet of Thorbjørn Jagland. He died on 5 May 2025, at the age of 82.
