= Dagfinn Høybråten =

Norwegian politician (born 1957)

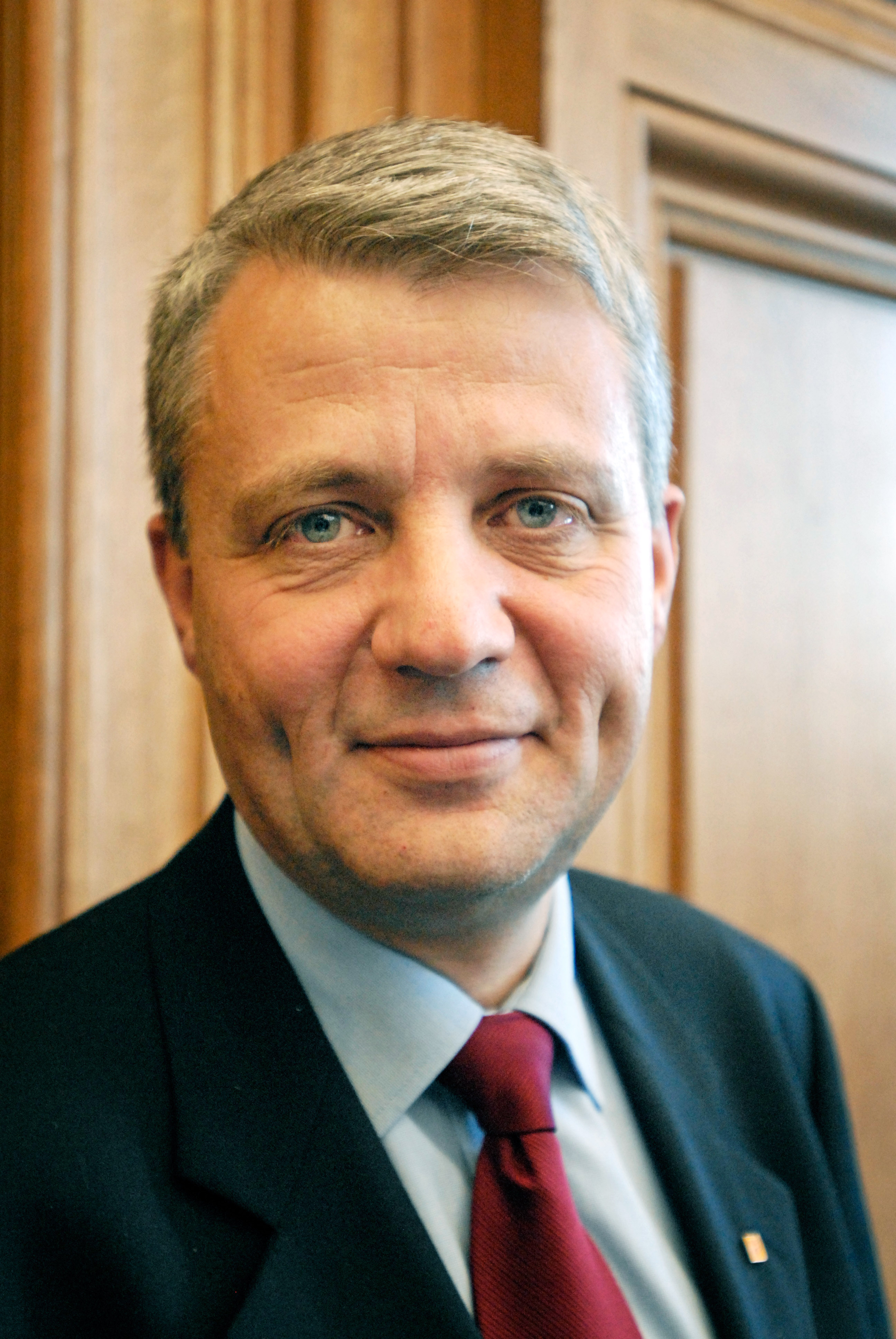

Leader of the Christian Democratic Party
- In office 23 January 2004 – 30 April 2011
- Preceded by: Valgerd Svarstad Haugland
- Succeeded by: Knut Arild Hareide

Minister of Health and Social Affairs
- In office 17 October 1997 – 17 March 2000
- Prime Minister: Kjell Magne Bondevik
- Preceded by: Gudmund Hernes
- Succeeded by: Tore Tønne

Minister of Health and Care Services
- In office 19 October 2001 – 18 June 2004
- Prime Minister: Kjell Magne Bondevik
- Preceded by: Tore Tønne
- Succeeded by: Ansgar Gabrielsen

Minister of Labour and Social Affairs
- In office 18 June 2004 – 17 October 2005
- Prime Minister: Kjell Magne Bondevik
- Preceded by: Ingjerd Schou
- Succeeded by: Bjarne Håkon Hanssen

President of the Nordic Council
- In office 1 January 2007 – 31 December 2007
- Preceded by: Ole Stavad
- Succeeded by: Erkki Tuomioja

Secretary General of the Nordic Council of Ministers
- In office 1 March 2013 – 17 March 2019
- Preceded by: Halldór Ásgrímsson
- Succeeded by: Paula Lehtomäki

Fifth Vice President of the Storting
- In office 1 October 2011 – 3 March 2013
- President: Dag Terje Andersen
- Preceded by: Line Holten Hjemdal
- Succeeded by: Line Holten Hjemdal

Member of the Norwegian Parliament
- In office 17 October 2005 – 4 March 2013
- Constituency: Rogaland

Personal details
- Born: 2 December 1957 (age 68) Oslo, Norway
- Party: Christian Democratic Party
- Children: 4
- Education: University of Oslo
- Occupation: Politician
- Profession: Political scientist

Dagfinn Høybråten (born 2 December 1957) is a Norwegian politician. He was the leader of the Christian Democratic Party 2004–2011. He was also Parliamentary leader from 2005 when he was elected as Member of Parliament representing Rogaland. He was Vice President of the Norwegian Parliament from 2011 to 2013. He was President of the Nordic Council in 2007. Høybråten was granted leave from his duty as Member of Parliament from March 2013 to take up the position as Secretary General of the Nordic Council of Ministers. He was elected board member of the GAVI Alliance in 2006 and chair of the board from 2011 to 2015.

In 2018 it was announced that Mr Høybråten will lead the "Truth and Reconciliation committee" regarding the discrimination of the indigenous Sami people in Norway up until 1980.

He was the chairman of the Young Christian Democrats (KrFU) in 1979–1982. Høybråten has been part of the political leadership of every Government the Christian Democratic Party has been part of since the early 1980s, first as a Political Adviser to Minister of Church and Education Kjell Magne Bondevik 1983–1986, later as State Secretary in the Ministry of Finance 1989–1990, Minister of Health 1997–2000 and 2001–2004 as well as Minister of Labour and Social Affairs 2004–2005.

Høybråten has also served as the Director General of Norway Social Security Administration 1997–2004, an executive director of the Norwegian Association of Local Government from 1990 to 1993 and a chief executive of the municipality of Oppegård 1994–1996. Høybråten holds a degree in political science from the University of Oslo.

== Early and personal life ==
Høybråten was born to churchwarden and politician Per Høybråten (1932–1990) and laboratory worker Åse Margrethe Hallen (born 1929). While he was born and grew up in Oslo, he lived for three years in Sandnes due to his father working there as a control veterinary. His father was politically active in the Christian Democratic Party, and was a State Secretary and deputy member of the Parliament of Norway from Oslo 1973–1977. Høybråten is married to his wife Jorun, and has four children.

== Political career ==
Høybråten became active in politics at an early age, and became deputy chairman of the Young Christian Democrats in 1978-1979 and chairman in 1979–1982. He got his first experience from Parliament as a personal assistant to Parliamentary leader of the Christian Democratic Party, Lars Korvald. When the Christian Democrats joined Kåre Willoch's government in 1983 Høybråten became a Political Adviser for Minister Kjell Magne Bondevik in the Ministry of Church and Education until 1986. I Jan P. Syse's government 1989-1990 he was State secretary in the Ministry of Finance.

He led the Ministry of Health and Care Services from 1997 to 2000 and again from 2001 to 2004. Following a 2004 Government reshuffle, Høybråten was transferred to lead the Ministry of Labour and Social Affairs. In 2004, he also assumed the leadership of the Christian Democratic Party.

As Minister of Health, Høybråten was noted for his campaign against tobacco smoking in public indoor places. It resulted in the adoption by Parliament of a bill banning smoking in restaurants, bars, and cafés that came into force on 1 June 2004. Several European countries followed the Norwegian experiences closely, and planned for similar legislation. Between 2004 and 2011 about 100 countries across the globe adopted a similar legislation. Høybråtens efforts have been credited for reducing the smoking rates and improving public health in Norway. Initially, the bill sparked some controversy, however it became popular after it passed. Høybråten received LHL's honorary award in 2006 for his work in this field. Høybråten was critical of employers advertising positions for non-smokers, since his he felt the issue ought to be fighting tobacco and its adverse health effects, rather than discriminating against people who smoke.

When former leader Valgerd Svarstad Haugland and the rest of the Party leadership withdrew in 2004 after a poor result in the local elections in 2003, Høybråten was elected new party leader at an extraordinary Party Congress. He became Member of Parliament of Norway from Rogaland in 2005, and he then also became parliamentary leader for the Christian Democratic Parliamentary group. After a year in the Scrutiny and Constitutional Affairs Committee he was from 2006 Member of the Committee of Foreign Affairs until he left Parliament. He was also President of the Nordic Council 2007–2008.

On 2 October 2010 Høybråten announced that he would not run for reelection as party leader at the 2011 party conference. He also announced that he would not run for a third term as member of Parliament in the 2013 general election. Knut Arild Hareide succeeded him from 30 April 2011. Høybråten was announced as the new secretary general of the Nordic Council of Ministers in September 2012 effective from 1 March 2013. He was granted a leave for the remainder of his term in parliament.

In 2016 he started to serve as board member at the Board of International Advisors at the Fudan Development Institute in Shanghai.

In March 2019 his tenure as secretary general at the Nordic Council of Ministers ended. On 1 April the same year he became secretary general of the Norwegian Church Aid.

== Gavi - the Vaccine Alliance ==
Høybråten was elected board member of Gavi – the Vaccine Alliance in 2006. In the period 2011–2015 he served as chair of the Gavi Alliance Board. He succeeded Mary Robinson, Graça Machel and Nelson Mandela in this position, and he is the longest-serving chair of the organisation. Gavi was set up in 2000 as a global Vaccine Alliance, bringing together public and private sectors with the shared goal of saving children's lives and protecting people's health by increasing access to immunisation in the world's poorest countries.

In 2015, new figures documented that Gavi has helped vaccinate half a billion children and saved 7 million lives since the organisation was funded. During Høybråten's term as chair, Gavi – the Vaccine Alliance had two replenishment conferences to finance the global vaccination work. Both in London 2011 and in Berlin 2015 the donors exceeded the ask, and managed to raise respectively 4.3 and US$7.539 billion.

== Awards and decorations ==
In 1999 Høybråten was appointed as honorary president of Yiang Central Hospital in the Hunan province of China. The hospital was founded in 1906 by Høybråtens great grandfather, Jørgen Edvin Nielsen. Høybråten was awarded the Grand Cross of St. Olav in 2004. In 2005 Høybråten was awarded an honorary degree from Luther College in Iowa.

Political offices
Preceded by Gudmund Hernes	Norwegian Minister of Health and Social Affairs; 1997–2000	Succeeded by Tore Tønne
Preceded by Tore Tønne	Norwegian Minister of Health; 2001–2004	Succeeded by Ansgar Gabrielsen
Preceded by position created	Norwegian Minister of Labour and Social Affairs; 2004–2005	Succeeded by Bjarne Håkon Hanssen
Party political offices
Preceded by Idar Magne Holme	Chairman of the Youth of the Christian People's Party; 1979–1982	Succeeded by Reidar Andestad
Preceded by Valgerd Svarstad Haugland	Leader of the Christian Democratic Party; 2004–2011	Succeeded by Knut Arild Hareide
Civic offices
Preceded by Eva Birkeland	Director of the National Insurance Administration; 1997–2004 (Arild Sundberg was acting from 1997–2000 and 2001–2004)	Succeeded by Arild Sundberg
