= Eldbjørg Løwer =

Norwegian politician

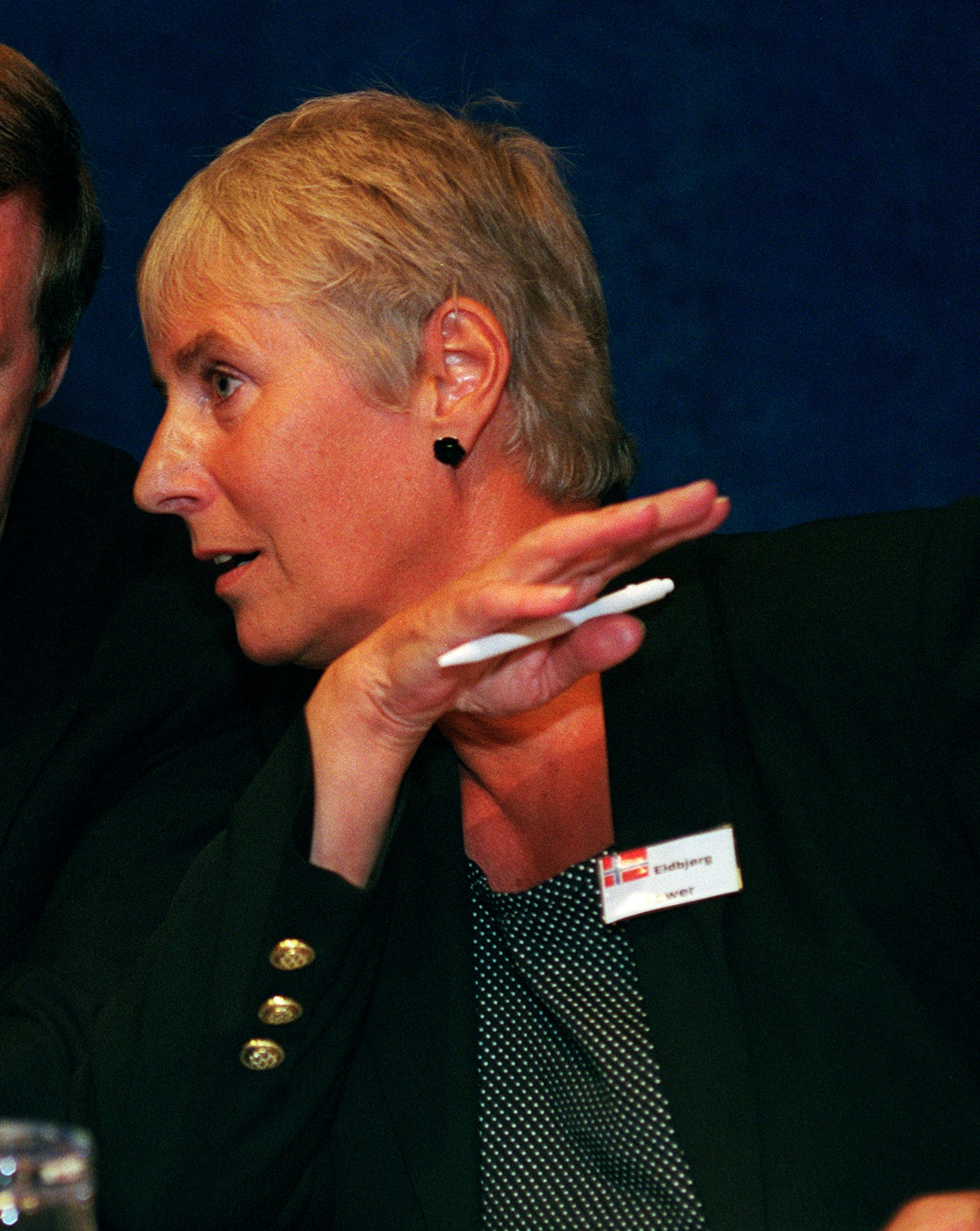

Minister of Defence
- In office 15 March 1999 – 17 March 2000
- Prime Minister: Kjell Magne Bondevik
- Preceded by: Dag Jostein Fjærvoll
- Succeeded by: Bjørn Tore Godal

Minister of Labour and Administration
- In office 17 October 1997 – 15 March 1999
- Prime Minister: Kjell Magne Bondevik
- Preceded by: Bendik Rugaas
- Succeeded by: Laila Dåvøy

Personal details
- Born: 14 July 1943 (age 82) Ål, Buskerud, Norway
- Party: Liberal

Eldbjørg Løwer (born 14 July 1943) is a Norwegian politician for the Liberal Party.

== Education ==
Løwer was trained at the Norwegian National Academy of Craft and Art Industry.

== Career ==
Løwer was a ceramist. Løwer began her career in politics and served as mayor of Kongsberg and later leader of Kongsberg Chamber of commerce. Løwer was Minister of Planning and Coordination and Minister of Local Government and Labour (local government affairs) in 1997, Minister of Labour and Administration 1998-1999, and Minister of Defence 1999-2000.

Since 2011 she has chaired the Norwegian Parliamentary Intelligence Oversight Committee.

== See also ==
- Minister of Defence (Norway)

Media offices
Preceded by Anne Carine Tanum	Chair of the Norwegian Broadcasting Corporation; 2004–2006	Succeeded by Hallvard Bakke
