= Frøy Kannert =

Norwegian politician

Frøy Kannert (born 19 May 1949) is a Norwegian journalist and politician for the Labour Party.

She grew up in Porsgrunn as a daughter of author Margaret Johansen (1923–2013) and office manager Harry Arnoldus Borchgrevink Kannert (1919–1952). Frøy Kannert took a cand.mag. degree, minoring in criminology, penal law and sociology as well as journalism. She worked at the Norwegian Journalist Academy, NRK Radio and Dagbladet. In 1993 she resigned from Dagbladet and moved to Longyearbyen. She left Svalbard in the spring of 1996. She was a board member of Kings Bay and Bjørnøen AS.

Moving back to the Norwegian mainland, she was hired as director of information in the Labour Party. In October 1996, Kannert was appointed as a State Secretary in the Office of the Prime Minister, where she served until Jagland's Cabinet fell in October 1997. She was also appointed to Det kriminalitetsforebyggende råd. After leaving politics, Kannert was an editor in Newswire and a department director for the government agency Kompetanse Norge (formerly Vox). She married and had two children, and resides at Stabekk.
