= Magnus Midtbø (politician) =

Norwegian politician

Magnus Midtbø (15 December 1942 – 25 February 2010) was a Norwegian trade unionist and politician for the Labour Party.

He was born in Ålvik. He took education in electronics and worked in this field before becoming a leading trade unionist. He joined the union Norwegian Engineers and Managers Association in 1971, and served as deputy leader from 1982 to 1989, acting leader from 1989 to 1990 and leader from 1990 to 2005. An exception was the period from 1996 to 1997, when he served in Jagland's Cabinet as State Secretary in the Ministry of Education, Research and Church Affairs.

Midtbø died in February 2010 in his Nesodden home.
