= Elsa Skjerven =

Norwegian politician (1919–2005)

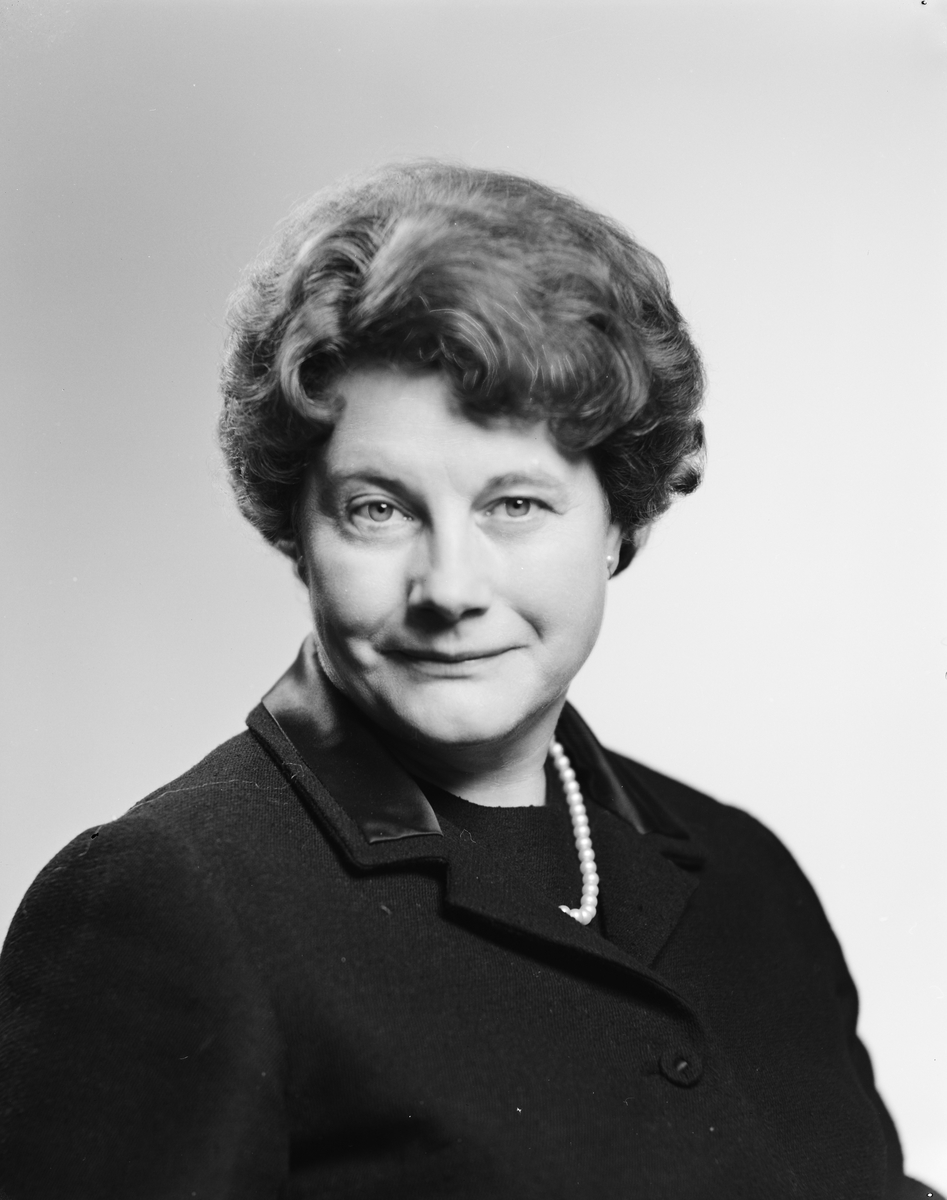
- Skjerven in 1968.

Minister of Family and Consumer Affairs
- In office 12 October 1965 – 17 March 1971
- Prime Minister: Per Borten
- Preceded by: Aase Bjerkholt
- Succeeded by: Inger Louise Valle

Deputy Member of the Norwegian Parliament
- In office 1 October 1965 – 30 September 1977
- Constituency: Sør-Trøndelag

Personal details
- Born: Elsa Rigmor Skjerven; 11 December 1919 Oslo, Norway
- Died: 29 October 2005 (aged 85) Bærum, Akershus, Norway
- Party: Christian Democratic

Elsa Rigmor Skjerven (11 December 1919 – 29 October 2005) was a Norwegian politician for the Christian Democratic Party.

She was born in Oslo.

She was never elected to the Norwegian Parliament, but served in the position of deputy representative from Sør-Trøndelag during the terms 1965–1969, 1969–1973 and 1973–1977.

In 1965 Skjerven was appointed Minister of Family and Consumer Affairs in the centre-right cabinet Borten. She held the position until the Borten cabinet fell in 1971.

Skjerven was a member of Trondheim city council from 1959 to 1983, as well as a member of Sør-Trøndelag county council in 1979–1982.

Political offices
| Preceded by Aase Bjerkholt | Minister of Family and Consumer Affairs; 1965–1971 | Succeeded by Inger Louise Valle |
