= Karita Bekkemellem =

Norwegian politician (born 1965)

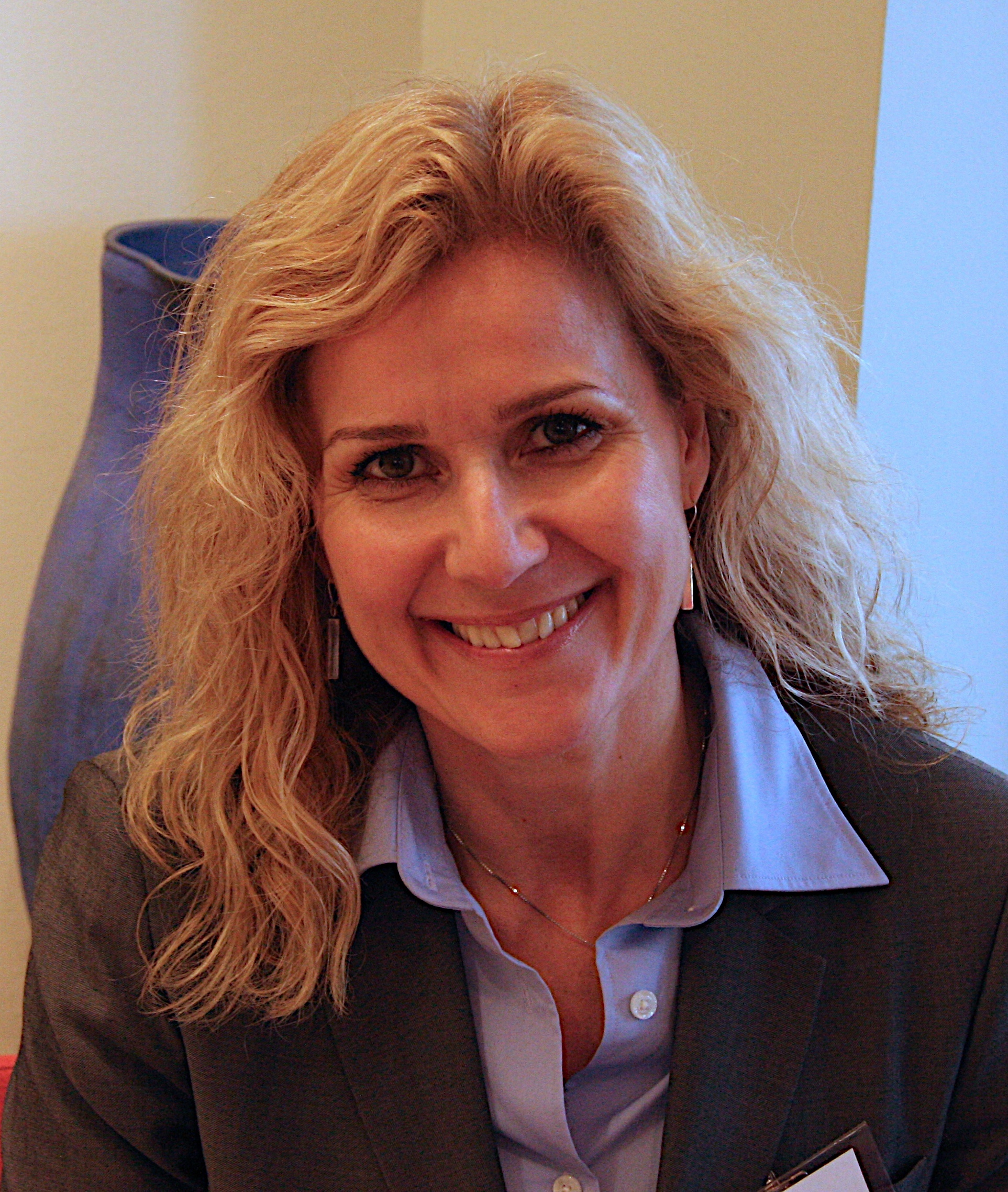

Minister of Children and Equality
- In office 17 October 2005 – 18 October 2007
- Prime Minister: Jens Stoltenberg
- Preceded by: Laila Dåvøy
- Succeeded by: Manuela Ramin-Osmundsen
- In office 17 March 2000 – 19 October 2001
- Prime Minister: Jens Stoltenberg
- Preceded by: Valgerd Svarstad Haugland
- Succeeded by: Laila Dåvøy

Personal details
- Born: 15 January 1965 (age 61) Lillehammer, Norway
- Party: Labour (formerly)
- Spouse: Stein Røsberg (2007–present)

Karita Bekkemellem (born 15 January 1965 in Lillehammer) is a Norwegian politician. She belongs to the Norwegian Labour Party, where she leads the women's network.

Bekkemellem was the Minister of Children and Families in Jens Stoltenberg's short-lived 2000-2001 cabinet, and also Minister of Children and Equality Affairs in the second cabinet Stoltenberg from 2005 to 2007. She is in her fifth period of representing the county of Møre og Romsdal. In the period from 2001 to 2005 she served as faction leader in the committee for church, education and research affairs.

Her autobiography Mitt røde hjerte (My Red Heart) was published in 2009. In this book, she described the circumstances surrounding her departure from the cabinet in 2007. She also described her childhood where her father had accidentally killed a girlfriend and turned to alcohol. She also wrote about her survival of a suicide attempt in 1992. It was revealed that she in 1983, when she was 18, had voted for the right-wing Progress Party, though this was apparently based more on her liking of the politician Lodve Solholm than the actual politics of the party.

In April 2024, she announced that she had left the Labour Party.

Political offices
Preceded by Valgerd Svarstad Haugland	Norwegian Minister of Children and Families; 2000–2001	Succeeded by Laila Dåvøy
Preceded by Laila Dåvøy	Norwegian Minister of Children and Equality; 2005–2007	Succeeded by Manuela Ramin-Osmundsen
