= Valgerd Svarstad Haugland =

Norwegian politician (born 1956)

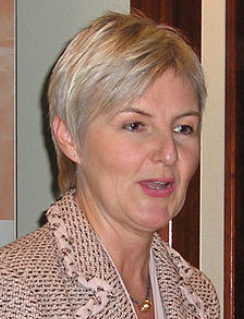
- Haugland in 2004

County Governor of Østfold, Buskerud, Oslo and Akershus (Note: Oslo and Viken between 2019 and 2024.)
- In office 1 January 2019 – 31 December 2024
- Monarch: Harald V
- Prime Minister: Erna Solberg; Jonas Gahr Støre
- Preceded by: Herself, as county Governor of Oslo and Akershus, later Oslo and Viken
- Succeeded by: Ingvild Aleksandersen (acting)

County Governor of Oslo and Akershus
- In office 5 December 2011 – 31 December 2018
- Monarch: Harald V
- Prime Minister: Jens Stoltenberg; Erna Solberg
- Preceded by: Hans J. Røsjorde
- Succeeded by: Herself, as Governor of Oslo and Viken

Minister of Culture
- In office 19 October 2001 – 17 October 2005
- Prime Minister: Kjell Magne Bondevik
- Preceded by: Ellen Horn
- Succeeded by: Trond Giske

Leader of the Christian Democratic Party
- In office 24 March 1995 – 23 January 2004
- Preceded by: Kjell Magne Bondevik
- Succeeded by: Dagfinn Høybråten

Minister of Children and Family Affairs
- In office 17 October 1997 – 17 March 2000
- Prime Minister: Kjell Magne Bondevik
- Preceded by: Sylvia Brustad
- Succeeded by: Karita Bekkemellem

Personal details
- Born: 23 August 1956 (age 69) Kvam Municipality, Hordaland, Norway
- Party: Christian Democratic

Valgerd Svarstad Haugland (born 23 August 1956) is a Norwegian teacher, politician and civil servant.

She was leader of the Christian Democratic Party in Norway from 1995 to 2004. She was Minister of Children and Family Affairs from 1997 to 2000 and Minister of Culture from 2001 to 2005. Since 2019, she has been County Governor of Østfold, Buskerud, Oslo and Akershus. Prior to that, she served as county Governor of Oslo and Akershus from 2011 to 2018. In May 2024, she announced that she wouldn't seek to be re-appointed county governor and would be leaving office by the end of the year. She announced her resignation in December, just shy of the end of her term, following revelations of the lack of treatment of discrepancies in the counties' health sector.

In her capacity as Minister of Culture and Church Affairs, she gave volunteer work particular emphasis.

She withdrew as party leader at an extraordinary annual assembly of the party on 23 January 2004. She was primarily held responsible for the poor results during the last local election, held in September 2003. In the 2005 parliamentary elections she failed to win a seat in parliament.

Until 2010 she was a board member of the Norwegian Broadcasting Corporation.

== Notes ==
Party political offices
Preceded by Kjell Magne Bondevik	Leader of the Christian Democratic Party; 1995–2004	Succeeded by Dagfinn Høybråten
Political offices
Preceded by Ellen Horn	Norwegian Minister of Culture and Church Affairs; 2001–2005	Succeeded by Trond Giske
Preceded by Sylvia Brustad	Norwegian Minister of Children and Families; 1997–2000	Succeeded by Karita Bekkemellem
