= Ansgar Gabrielsen =

Norwegian consultant and politician

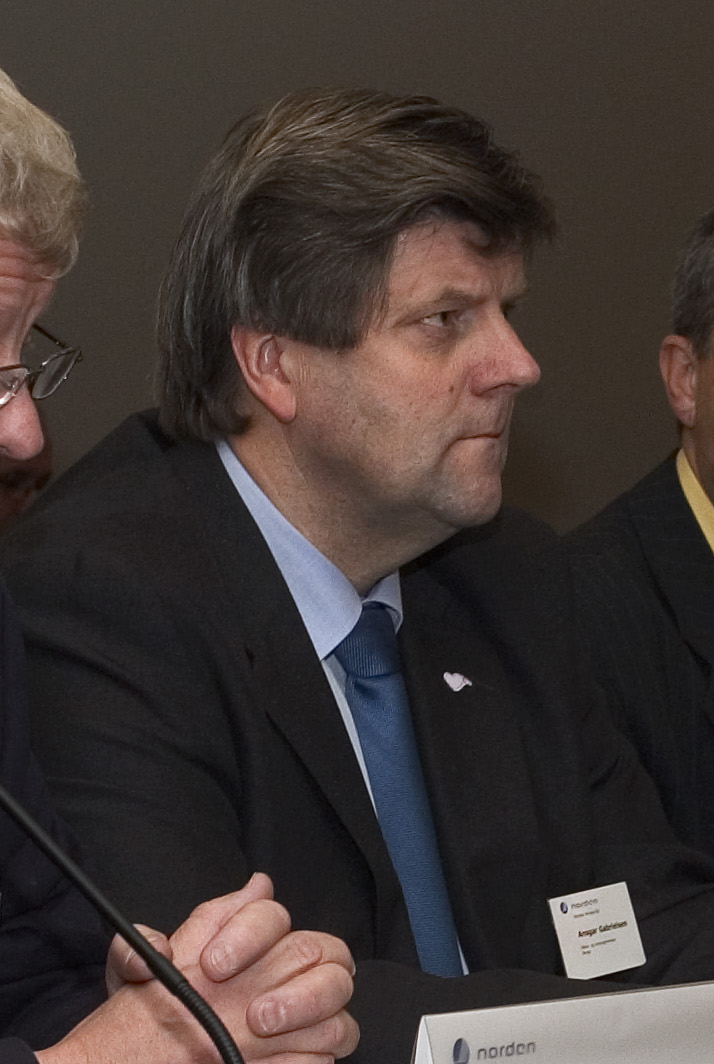
- Gabrielsen in 2004

Minister of Health and Care Services
- In office 18 June 2004 – 17 October 2005
- Prime Minister: Kjell Magne Bondevik
- Preceded by: Dagfinn Høybråten
- Succeeded by: Sylvia Brustad

Minister of Trade and Industry
- In office 19 October 2001 – 18 June 2004
- Prime Minister: Kjell Magne Bondevik
- Preceded by: Grete Knudsen
- Succeeded by: Børge Brende

Personal details
- Born: 21 May 1955 (age 71) Mandal, Vest-Agder, Norway
- Party: Conservative
- Occupation: Consultant and former politician

Ansgar Gabrielsen (born 21 May 1955 in Mandal) is a Norwegian consultant and former politician for the Conservative Party.

== Early life and local politics ==
He was born in Mandal as a son of Terje Gabrielsen and Astrid Olsen. He is an insurance agent by education and worked in this profession before entering politics. He is also a trained officer in the Norwegian Defence Force. He was a member of the municipal council of Lindesnes Municipality from 1983 to 1993, the last six years as mayor. His father Terje Gabrielsen has also been mayor of Lindesnes Municipality, from 1975 to 1979. Ansgar Gabrielsen also chaired his county party chapter from 1989 to 1990, and was a member of the Conservative Party central board during the same period.

== National politics ==
He was elected to the Parliament of Norway from Vest-Agder in 1993, and was re-elected on the two following occasions in 1997 and 2001. In 2001 Gabrielsen was appointed Minister of Trade and Industry as a part of Bondevik's Second Cabinet. Following the cabinet reshuffle in 2004 he became Minister of Health and Care Services. While Gabrielsen was a cabinet member his seat in parliament was taken by Peter Skovholt Gitmark. Bondevik's Second Cabinet fell following the 2005 election.

While Minister of Trade and Industry, Gabrielsen was first criticized for his suggestion about a law that requires 40% of the board members in Norwegian companies to be female. The law was passed with the blessing of the socialist parties, but his own party opposed it.

== Post-political career ==
Gabrielsen moved from Lindesnes when being elected in 1993, and resided at Østerås. He also kept his residential address in Spangereid, his constituent district. Towards the end of his cabinet tenure, he was reported as residing in a yacht at Aker Brygge in Oslo. In 2007 he stood for municipal re-election in Lindesnes, and won a seat. However, as it surfaced that he had recently bought an apartment in Oslo, he had to relinquish the seat.

Gabrielsen started his own consultant company in 2006. In 2007 he became chairman of the Special Olympics and the Norwegian Council for Mental Health.

In 2007, Tor Øystein Vaaland, former leader of the Norwegian Council for Mental Health, published the book Brev til en minister (Letters to a Minister) based on private letters Gabrielsen received while he served as Minister of Health, with a focus on letters from people with psychiatric problems or drug addiction. The book was published in 205,000 copies and distributed to Norwegian healthcare workers.

Gabrielsen was decorated as a Commander of the Order of St. Olav in 2005. Gabrielsen is married and has four children.

In 2014 was elected as chairman of the board at CSAM Health.

Political offices
Preceded by Grete Knudsen	Norwegian Minister of Trade and Industry; 2001–2004	Succeeded by Børge Brende
Preceded by Dagfinn Høybråten	Norwegian Minister of Health and Care Services; 2004–2005	Succeeded by Sylvia Brustad
