= Marianne Andreassen =

Norwegian economist and civil servant

Managing Director of the Storting
- In office 2 May 2018 – 28 June 2022
- Preceded by: Ida Børresen

State Secretary for the Ministry of Finance
- In office 19 August 1994 – 17 October 1997
- Prime Minister: Gro Harlem Brundtland
- Minister: Sigbjørn Johnsen; Jens Stoltenberg

State Secretary for the Ministry of Foreign Affairs
- In office 15 October 1993 – 24 June 1994
- Prime Minister: Gro Harlem Brundtland
- Minister: Johan Jørgen Holst; Bjørn Tore Godal

Personal details
- Born: 1 August 1961 (age 65) Harstad, Troms, Norway
- Education: University of Oslo
- Occupation: Civil servant

Marianne van den Houten Andreassen (born 1 August 1961) is a Norwegian economist and civil servant, who served as the managing director of the Storting from 2018 to 2022.

== Biography ==
Born in Harstad, Andreassen graduated as an economist from the University of Oslo in 1985. She has earlier been part of the management of SpareBank 1, state secretary in the Ministry of Finance, and director of Norwegian State Educational Loan Fund. From November 2012 to May 2018, she was CEO of the State Loan Fund for Education. She was appointed director of the Storting in 2018. She resigned from her position on 28 June 2022 after receiving a fee from the Norwegian Data Protection Authority as a consequence of a data breach back in 2020.

As a politician, she was part of Brundtland's Third Cabinet as a political adviser in the Ministry of Foreign Affairs from January 1992 to October 1993. She advanced to State Secretary until June 1994. From August 1994, she was a State Secretary in the Ministry of Finance, continuing as such in Jagland's Cabinet, until 1997.

Civic offices
| Preceded by | Director of the Norwegian State Educational Loan Fund –2018 | Succeeded by |
| Preceded by Kyrre Grimstad (acting) | Managing director of the Storting; 2018– | Succeeded by incumbent |
