= Britt Schultz =

Norwegian politician

Britt Schultz (born 30 January 1945) is a Norwegian politician for the Labour Party.

She served as a deputy representative to the Norwegian Parliament from Finnmark during the term 1977–1981.

During the cabinet Jagland, Schultz was appointed State Secretary in the Office of the Prime Minister. She was again appointed State Secretary during the first cabinet Stoltenberg, this time in the Ministry of Trade and Industry.
