= Trond Giske =

Norwegian politician (born 1966)

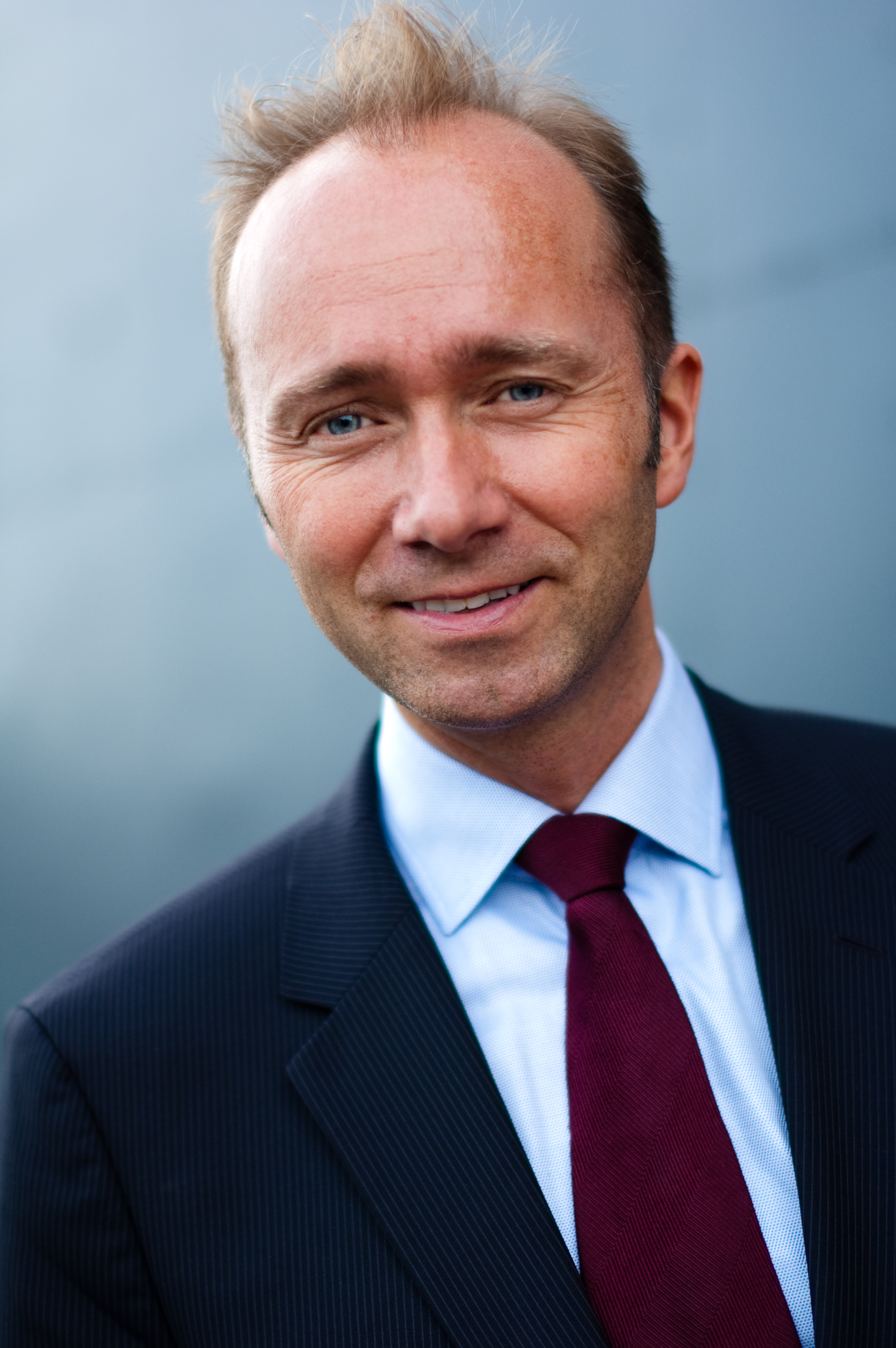
- Giske during the opening of Rockheim.

Deputy Leader of the Labour Party
- In office 18 April 2015 – 7 January 2018 Serving with Hadia Tajik
- Leader: Jonas Gahr Støre
- Preceded by: Helga Pedersen
- Succeeded by: Bjørnar Skjæran

Minister of Trade and Industry
- In office 20 October 2009 – 16 October 2013
- Prime Minister: Jens Stoltenberg
- Preceded by: Sylvia Brustad
- Succeeded by: Monica Mæland

Minister of Culture and Church Affairs
- In office 17 October 2005 – 20 October 2009
- Prime Minister: Jens Stoltenberg
- Preceded by: Valgerd Svarstad Haugland
- Succeeded by: Anniken Huitfeldt

Minister of Education and Research
- In office 17 March 2000 – 19 October 2001
- Prime Minister: Jens Stoltenberg
- Preceded by: Jon Lilletun
- Succeeded by: Kristin Clemet

Member of the Storting
- Incumbent
- Assumed office 1 October 2025
- Constituency: Sør-Trøndelag
- In office 1 October 1997 – 30 September 2021
- Deputy: Tore Nordseth; Ola Røtvei; Arne L. Haugen; Audun Otterstad
- Constituency: Sør-Trøndelag

Leader of the Workers' Youth League
- In office 6 September 1992 – 27 October 1996
- Preceded by: Turid Birkeland
- Succeeded by: Anniken Huitfeldt

Personal details
- Born: 7 November 1966 (age 59) Trondheim, Sør-Trøndelag, Norway
- Party: Labour
- Spouse: Haddy N'jie (m. 2019)
- Domestic partner: Anne Grethe Moe (1996–2006)
- Children: 2
- Education: University of Oslo

Trond Giske (born 7 November 1966) is a Norwegian politician who served as deputy leader of the Labour Party from 2015 until his resignation in 2018 after accusations of widespread sexual harassment and sexual assault against multiple women. After renewed allegations in 2020 he announced his complete and permanent withdrawal from politics. In 2024 he returned to politics, becoming the deputy leader of the Trondheim Labour Party. In 2025, he was once more elected to the Storting.

Giske was elected into the Norwegian parliament for Sør-Trøndelag county in 1997, and served as Minister of Education and Church Affairs in the first cabinet of Jens Stoltenberg from 2000 to 2001, as Minister of Culture and Church Affairs in Stoltenberg's Second Cabinet from 2005 to 2009 and as Minister of Trade and Industry from 2009 to 2013. As a cabinet member he several times faced accusations of cronyism by having appointed little-qualified close friends to well paid government jobs, which also led to formal inquiries into his actions in the Standing Committee on Scrutiny and Constitutional Affairs.

In December 2017, during the Me Too controversy triggered by the allegations against Harvey Weinstein, Giske was accused of an extensive pattern of sexual harassment and sexual assault of young women, leading to the so-called Giske affair, which dominated Norwegian media for several weeks. After admitting to some of the accusations against him, Giske was asked to permanently resign by party leader Jonas Gahr Støre on 1 January 2018, which he subsequently did on 7 January 2018 shortly before the party executive committee were to debate the matter and shortly before Støre was about to state publicly that Giske needed to resign. On 25 January 2018 the Labour Party ruled that Giske had violated the party's rules against sexual harassment and that his behaviour disqualified him from holding offices or positions of trust in the party. In response Giske sought legal assistance against his own party. He faced intense criticism when seeking election as chairman of a local party branch in 2020, and as a result announced his withdrawal from politics. In 2023 Dagens Næringsliv reported that Giske had threatened the Labour Party with a lawsuit, resulting in a settlement where the party paid his legal expenses and wrote a letter as demanded by Giske which said that the party leadership couldn't rule out the possibility of a comeback.

In August 2024, Giske announced his intentions of a comeback to national politics and he was seeking the top nomination spot from Sør-Trøndelag for the Labour Party. Giske won the rights to be suggested for the top spot for the upcoming nomination meeting for Sør-Trøndelag electoral district by the Trondheim Labour Party, despite several members of Trondheim Labour Party accusing Giske and his supporters of organizing a coup to let Giske get the top spot. Before the nomination meeting took place, Giske was more than once rejected from the nomination committee's recommendation. However, Giske won the nomination for top spot with 76 votes over Per Olav Skurdal Hopsø's 57 votes. Several candidates withdrew from the nomination list following Giske's victory, including all candidates from the Trøndelag Workers' Youth League (AUF). Giske was elected to the Storting once more in 2025 and thus he had returned to national politics.

== Early life and education ==
Born in Trondheim, Sør-Trøndelag, he is the son of engineer Bjørn Giske (1938–) and associate professor Norunn Illevold (1935–). He attended the University of Oslo and the Norwegian University of Science and Technology, receiving a cand.mag. degree in 1997. Giske was an honorary member of the fraternity "Kjeller" during his studies.

== Political career ==
Active in the Workers' Youth League from an early age, Giske became the leader of its Trondheim branch in 1988, before becoming the leader of its Sør-Trøndelag branch the following year. In 1992 Giske was elected head of the Workers Youth League as a whole. He served until 1996, the following year he was elected to the parliament, the Storting for the first time, he has since been reelected on three occasions. In March 2000 Prime Minister Jens Stoltenberg appointed Giske as the new Minister of Education and Church affairs. He would serve in this capacity until the minority Labour government fell in the 2001 elections. 4 years later, the 2005 elections again swept the Labour party to power as a part of the Red-green coalition and Trond Giske was then appointed Minister of Culture. He would remain in this position until October 2009, when as a part of a cabinet reshuffle he was appointed Minister of Trade and Industry, succeeding Sylvia Brustad.

Following a confidence vote against the leader of the Trondheim Labour Party, Gunn Elen Høgni, Giske was elected deputy leader, succeeding Jørn Arve Flått. Alongside Giske, Per Sture Nilsen was elected leader.

=== Minister of Trade and Industry ===
In January 2012, Giske received widespread attention for his opposition to the sale of TV 2 to a Danish company. Giske spoke out against the transfer of 100% of TV 2's shares to the Egmont Group, at a price of 2.1 billion NOK (274 million euros), despite Prime Minister Jens Stoltenberg stating his government would have no opinion on the case. It was reported that Giske threatened the head of the Telenor Group, Harald Norvik, with the loss of his position if the sale went through.

One of the policies championed during Giskes tenure as minister has been the so-called "salary moderation". The idea is that the leaders of state owned companies or companies where the Norwegian government was majority shareholder should not earn more in salary than their counterparts in the private sector. Giske called on board members and CEO's to adhere to this policy or risk being replaced.

== Media appearances ==
As a well known Labour politician in Norway, Giske has had numerous appearances in the media. He displays an interest in culturally related subjects such as film, literature and especially football. He is also well known for his personal friendship with members of the royal family, namely Princess Märtha Louise of Norway and her previous husband, the author Ari Behn. He is also known for being a big supporter of his home town football club Rosenborg. In 2008, while serving as Minister of Culture and Church Affairs, Giske said after a meeting with UEFA president Michel Platini that he considered the number of foreign players in Rosenborg and the Norwegian top division unfortunate and that clubs risked losing their identity if key players no longer came from the clubs' region.

== Controversy ==
=== Allegations of cronyism ===
Giske has several times faced accusations of cronyism by having appointed little-qualified close friends to well paid government jobs, which also led to formal inquiries into his actions in the Standing Committee on Scrutiny and Constitutional Affairs.

Entra

In October 2012, Trond Giske's long-time friend and Labour party colleague Rune Olsø was appointed CEO of Entra Eiendom, a company wholly owned by the Ministry of Trade and Industry. Olsø was to receive NOK 4.2 million in salary, which was perceived by some to be in violation of Giske's own policy of moderation. Later it was revealed that the chairman and vice-chairman of the board opposed the appointment of Olsø, but lost the vote due to pressure from members who had personal or political ties to Giske. In the wake of the affair, prime minister Jens Stoltenberg appointed Bård Vegar Solhjell to handle the matter, as Giske had recused himself. Solhjell responded by firing three board members, including two who were largely seen as having close ties to Giske. Ten days after the story broke, Rune Olsø resigned as CEO of Entra.

Telenor

In October 2012, several media reported that Giske had demanded that his close friend and colleague Tore O. Sandvik be appointed to the board of directors of The Telenor Group, even though the board had stated that Sandvik "was not even close to being qualified", the board also objected due to the fact that Sandvik was considered one of Giske's closest friends. According to the media reports Giske eventually relented, but only after the board accepted another friend, Hallvard Bakke, instead; Bakke himself stated that he had no knowledge about the telecommunications industry. Giske vehemently denied ever having made the demand, claiming it might have been a mere proposal.

On 25 October 2012, it emerged that in 2009, when he was Minister of Culture, Giske personally appointed Tore O. Sandvik's wife and former party colleague Trine Brænden to the board of directors at the prestigious Trondheim Symphony Orchestra (TSO). Giske stated that they were not close friends.

=== Sexual assault and harassment and resignation ===
In December 2017, in what became known as the Giske affair, Giske was accused by multiple younger women of sexual harassment and sexual assault. The accusations came in the context of the international Me Too debate in the aftermath of the Harvey Weinstein sexual abuse allegations, and dominated Norwegian media for several weeks. Giske admitted to some of the allegations of sexual misconduct, although he denied some of the accusations. On 1 January 2018 he was relieved of his duty as deputy leader for the Labour Party for an indefinite period as a result of the allegations. On 7 January 2018 he permanently resigned as deputy leader of the Labour Party stating that it was impossible for himself and his family to withstand the pressure of the picture that was painted of him by the media. Labour Party leader Jonas Gahr Støre stated that he had asked Giske to permanently resign a week earlier. Giske's final resignation came shortly before the party executive committee were to debate the Giske affair. According to Aftenposten, Giske's resignation came only hours before party leader Støre was about to state publicly that Giske did not have his confidence and needed to resign. On 25 January 2018 the Labour Party ruled that Giske had violated the party's rules against sexual harassment and that his behaviour disqualified him from having offices in the party. In response Giske sought legal assistance against his own party.

In 2020, Giske faced intense criticism and renewed allegations of sexual harassment and sexual assault when he sought election as chairman of the local Trøndelag party branch; as a result he withdrew his candidacy and announced his complete and permanent withdrawal from politics.

=== Potential lawsuit against the Labour Party ===
In 2023, Dagens Næringsliv reported that Giske had threatened the Labour Party with a lawsuit, resulting in a settlement where the party paid his legal expenses and an agreement that included a stipulation about the possibility of a comeback.

== Personal life ==
Giske was in a relationship with Anne Grethe Moe from ca. 1996 until they separated amicably in 2006. They have one daughter, Una, together. From 2014, he has been in a relationship with singer and television host Haddy N'jie and the couple has two daughters, born in 2016 and 2022. They married in 2019. His nephew, Johannes Dalen Giske, was on Utøya during the 2011 Norway attacks.

== Bibliography ==
- 2009: Mangfold eller enfold: 21 stemmer om kultur i vår tid, Aschehoug
- 2009: "Hvem snakker for Bob Kåre?," Aschehoug (with Hadia Tajik)

== See also ==
- Workers' Youth League affair

Political offices
Preceded by Sylvia Brustad	Minister of Trade and Industry; 2009–2013	Succeeded by Monica Mæland
Preceded by Valgerd Svarstad Haugland	Minister of Culture and Church Affairs; 2005–2009	Succeeded by Anniken Huitfeldt
Preceded by Jon Lilletun	Minister of Education and Research; 2000–2001	Succeeded by Kristin Clemet
Party political offices
Preceded by Turid Birkeland	Leader of the Workers' Youth League; 1992–1996	Succeeded by Anniken Huitfeldt
Preceded by Helga Pedersen	Deputy Leader of the Labour Party; 2015–2018	Succeeded by Bjørnar Skjæran
Preceded by Jørn Arve Flått	Deputy Leader of the Trondheim Labour Party; 2024–present	Incumbent
