= Audun Otterstad =

Norwegian politician (born 1991)

Audun Otterstad (born 14 June 1991) is a Norwegian politician for the Labour Party.

He hails from Skaun Municipality. He was elected as a deputy representative to the Parliament of Norway from Sør-Trøndelag in 2013. As Trond Giske from Sør-Trøndelag was a member of the outgoing Stoltenberg's Second Cabinet, Otterstad met as a regular representative during the two weeks before the cabinet change.
