= Laila Dåvøy =

Norwegian politician

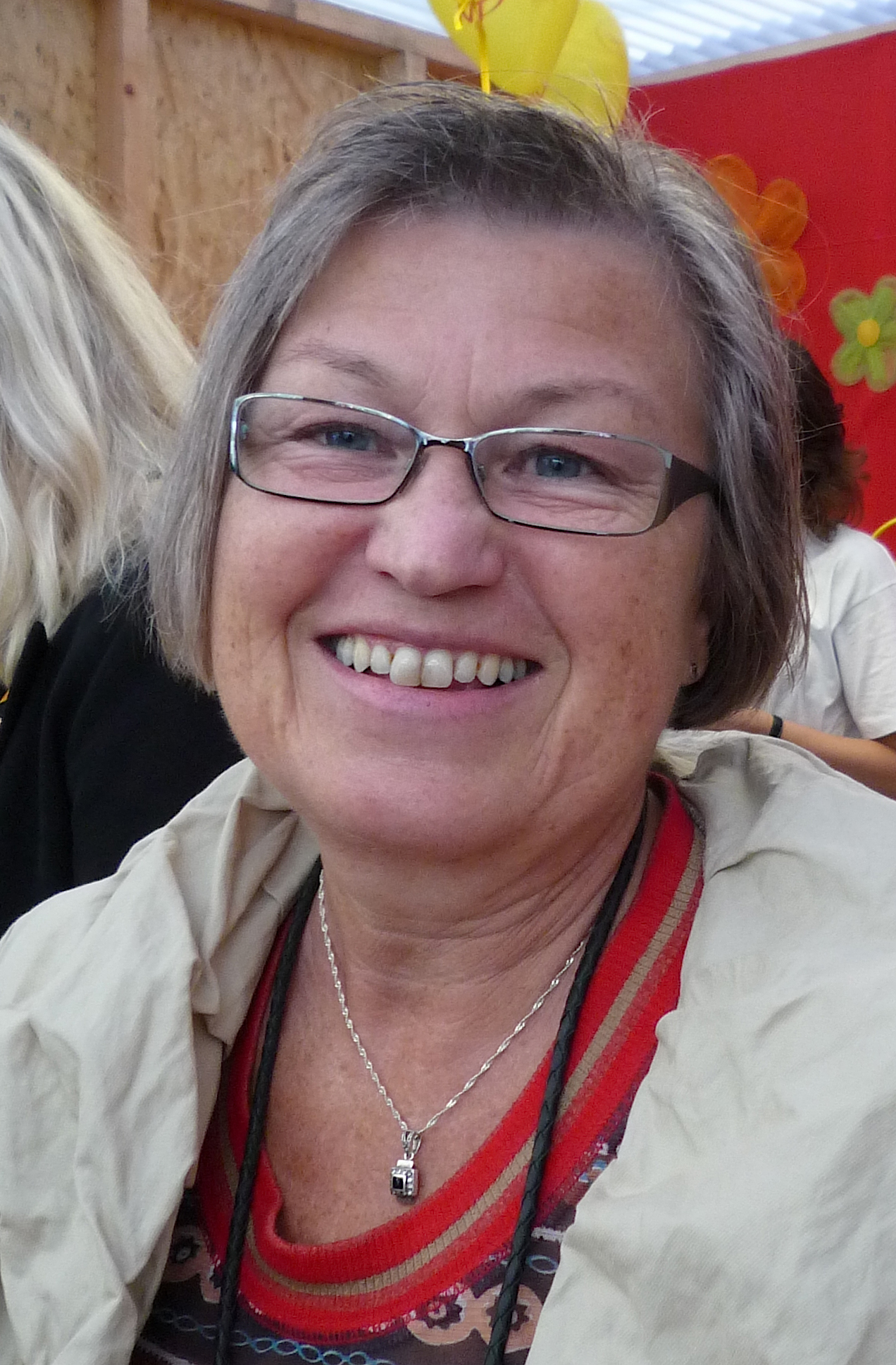

Member of Parliament for Hordaland
- In office 1 October 2005 – 30 September 2013

Minister of Government, Reform and Church Affairs
- In office 15 March 1999 – 17 March 2000
- Prime Minister: Kjell Magne Bondevik
- Preceded by: Eldbjørg Løwer
- Succeeded by: Jørgen Kosmo

Minister of Children and Equality
- In office 19 October 2001 – 17 October 2005
- Prime Minister: Kjell Magne Bondevik
- Preceded by: Karita Bekkemellem
- Succeeded by: Karita Bekkemellem

Personal details
- Born: 11 August 1948 (age 77) Bergen, Norway
- Party: Christian Democratic
- Spouse: Married
- Children: Three
- Profession: Nurse

Laila Dåvøy (born 11 August 1948, in Bergen) is a Norwegian nurse and politician for the Christian Democratic Party. She is a former member of the Norwegian parliament and a former Minister and leader of the Norwegian Nurses' Union.

== Career ==
Dåvøy was a member of the executive committee of the municipal council of Askøy Municipality from 1983 to 1987. From 1987 to 1991 she was a deputy member of Hordaland county council.

From 1989 to 1990, during the cabinet Syse, Dåvøy was appointed personal secretary (today known as political advisor) in the Ministry of Culture and Church Affairs. From August to November 1990 she was State Secretary in the same ministry.

A nurse by education, Davøy was the leader of the Norwegian Nurses' Union 1992 - 1998.

In 1999 she was appointed Norwegian Minister of Labour and Administration in the first cabinet Bondevik, an office she left when the cabinet fell in 2000. From 2001 to 2005, when the second cabinet Bondevik held office, Dåvøy was Norwegian Minister of Children and Family Affairs.

She was elected to the Norwegian Parliament from Hordaland in 2005 and re-elected in 2009. She did not seek reelection to the parliament in 2013.

== Personal life ==
Dåvøy lives in Askøy Municipality, is married and has three children.

Political offices
Preceded by Eldbjørg Løwer	Norwegian Minister of Labour and Administration; 1999–2000	Succeeded by Jørgen Kosmo
Preceded by Karita Bekkemellem	Norwegian Minister of Children and Families; 2001–2005	Succeeded by Karita Bekkemellem
