= Liv Undheim =

Norwegian politician (1949–2011)

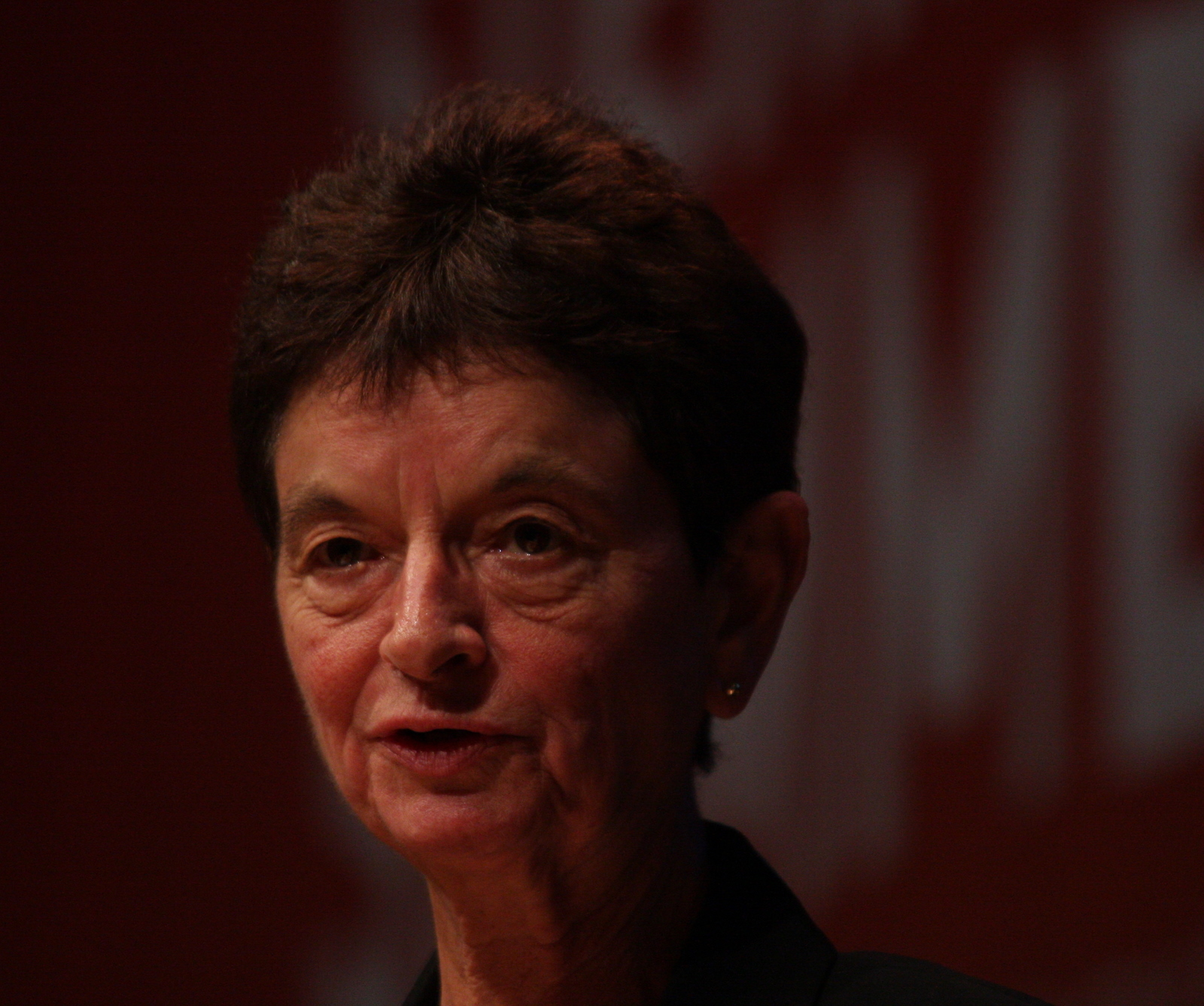
Liv Undheim

Liv Undheim (7 October 1949 – 4 April 2011) was a Norwegian trade unionist and politician for the Labour Party.

She was a factory laborer in the china company Figgjo for thirteen years, before being hired as a secretary in the Norwegian Union of Chemical Industry Workers. After nine years here she became deputy leader in 2001. When her union became a part of Industri Energi after the merger in September 2006, she continued as deputy leader there until October 2010.

From 1996 to 1997 she served in Jagland's Cabinet as State Secretary, first for energy affairs in the Ministry of Industry and Energy and then in the Ministry of Education, Research and Church Affairs. She was a board member of the Directorate of Labour and the Norwegian Labour Inspection Authority. She died in April 2011 after a long-term illness.
