= Sylvia Brustad =

Norwegian politician (born 1966)

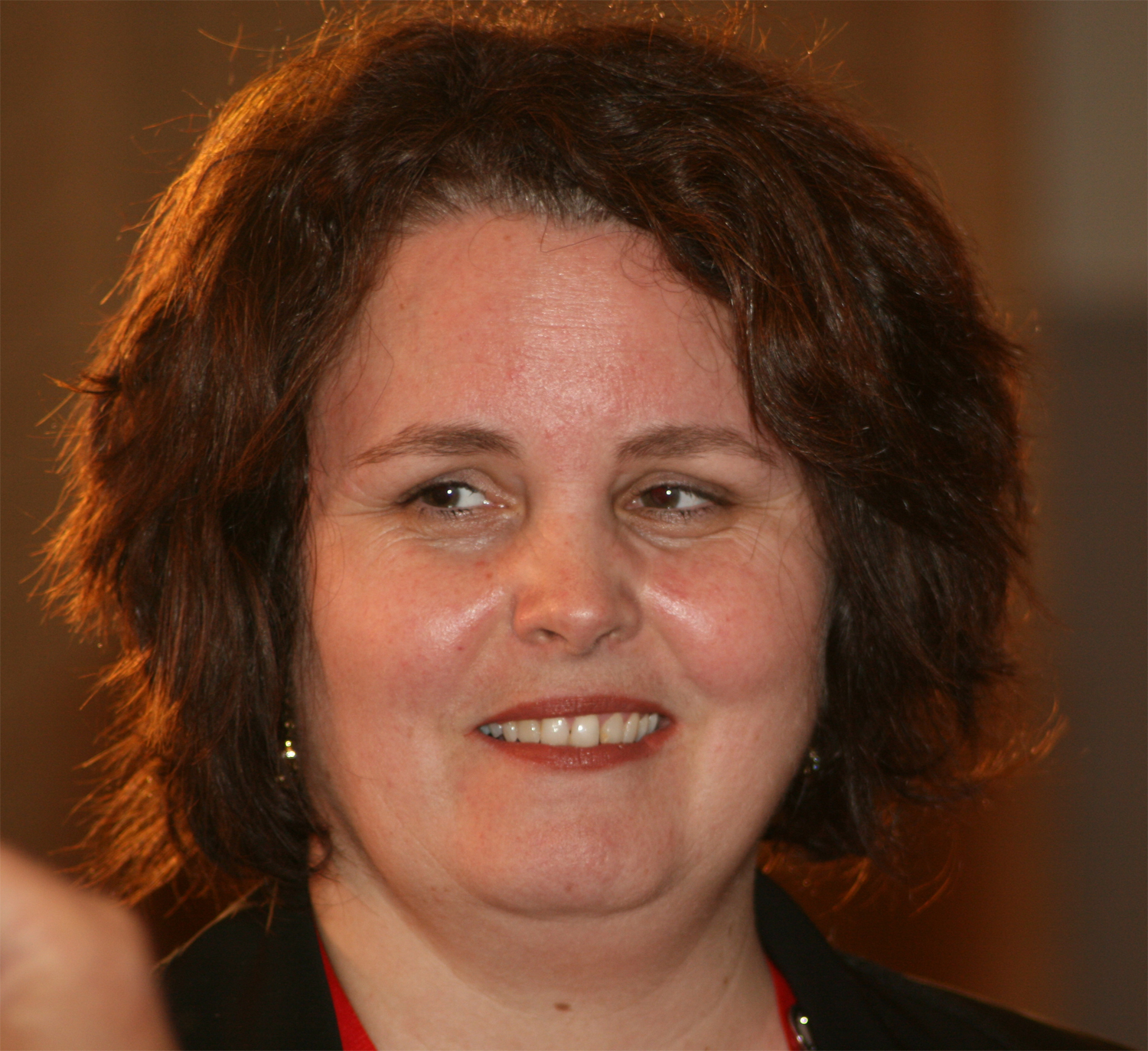
- Brustad in 2009

Governor of Hedmark
- Acting; 1 January 2010 – 16 October 2013
- Monarch: Harald V
- Preceded by: Tormod W. Karlstrøm (acting)
- Succeeded by: Sigbjørn Johnsen

Minister of Fisheries
- Acting; 2 October 2009 – 20 October 2009
- Prime Minister: Jens Stoltenberg
- Preceded by: Helga Pedersen
- Succeeded by: Lisbeth Berg-Hansen

Minister of Trade and Industry
- In office 20 June 2008 – 20 October 2009
- Prime Minister: Jens Stoltenberg
- Preceded by: Dag Terje Andersen
- Succeeded by: Trond Giske

Minister of Health and Care Services
- In office 17 October 2005 – 20 June 2008
- Prime Minister: Jens Stoltenberg
- Preceded by: Ansgar Gabrielsen
- Succeeded by: Bjarne Håkon Hansen

Minister of Local Government
- In office 17 March 2000 – 19 October 2001
- Prime Minister: Jens Stoltenberg
- Preceded by: Odd Roger Enoksen
- Succeeded by: Erna Solberg

Minister of Children and Families
- In office 25 October 1996 – 17 October 1997
- Prime Minister: Thorbjørn Jagland
- Preceded by: Grete Berget
- Succeeded by: Valgerd Svarstad Haugland

Minister of Labour and Administration
- Acting; 25 October 1996 – 15 November 1996
- Prime Minister: Thorbjørn Jagland
- Preceded by: Nils Olav Totland
- Succeeded by: Terje Rød-Larsen

Member of the Storting
- In office 1 October 1989 – 30 September 2009
- Deputy: Grethe G. Fossum; Erling Brandsnes; Ivar Skulstad
- Constituency: Hedmark

Personal details
- Born: 19 December 1966 (age 59) Elverum, Hedmark, Norway
- Party: Labour

Sylvia Brustad (born 19 December 1966, in Elverum) is a former Norwegian politician for the Labour Party.

== Education ==
Brustad graduated from high school in 1983, and attended the media courses at the folk high school in Ringsaker Municipality until 1985. She then worked as a journalist, among other publications she worked for LO-aktuelt, the news publication of the Norwegian Confederation of Trade Unions.

== Political career ==
=== Parliament ===
Brustad was elected to a county council seat in Hedmark following the local elections of 1987. In the 1989 election, she was elected to a seat in the Norwegian Parliament and left county politics.

=== Government ===
In cabinet Jagland which held office between 1996 and 1997, she was Minister for Children and Family Affairs. She was later Minister for Local Government and Regional Development in the first cabinet Stoltenberg between 2000 and 2001. Following the electoral victory of the 2005 elections, Brustad became Minister of Health and Care Services in the second cabinet Stoltenberg. She was moved to the post of Minister of Trade and Industry in June 2008 and left the government in October 2009.

Brustad became known for her role as Minister for Child and Family Affairs in 1996 when a law restricting the opening hours of shops on Sundays, holidays and after nine in the evening was passed. Only stores smaller than 100 square metres were allowed to remain open, such shops were somewhat disparagingly nicknamed "Brustadbuer" ("Brustad shacks"), until the law was quietly repealed in 2003. Brustad herself claimed that she had not personally advocated the law, but that she was required to follow through on a decision within the Labour Party.

Political offices
| Preceded by Nils Olav Totland | Norwegian Minister of Administration (acting); October 1996–November 1996 | Succeeded by Terje Rød-Larsen |
| Preceded by Grete Berget | Norwegian Minister of Children and Families; 1996–1997 | Succeeded by Valgerd Svarstad Haugland |
| Preceded by Odd Roger Enoksen | Norwegian Minister of Local Government and Regional Development; 2000–2001 | Succeeded by Erna Solberg |
| Preceded by Ansgar Gabrielsen | Norwegian Minister of Health and Care Services; 2005–2008 | Succeeded by Bjarne Håkon Hanssen |
| Preceded by Dag Terje Andersen | Norwegian Minister of Trade and Industry; 2008–2009 | Succeeded by Trond Giske |
| Preceded by Helga Pedersen | Norwegian Minister of Fisheries and Coastal Affairs; 2009–2009 | Succeeded by Lisbeth Berg-Hansen |
Civic offices
| Preceded by Tormod W. Karlstrøm (acting) | County Governor of Hedmark (acting); 2010–2013 | Succeeded by Sigbjørn Johnsen |
