= Åse Kleveland =

Norwegian musician, politician and activist (born 1949)

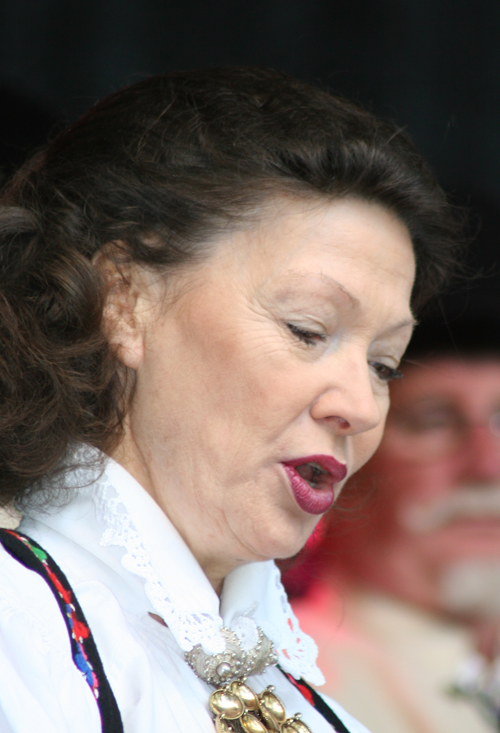
- Kleveland at Constitution Day, 2007

Background information
- Born: Åse Maria Kleveland; 18 March 1949 (age 77); Stockholm, Sweden
- Origin: Sweden; Norway
- Genres: Popular music, vispop
- Occupations: Musician, politician, leader
- Instruments: Singer, guitarist
- Years active: 1965–present
- Spouse: Oddvar Bull Tuhus

Minister of Culture
- In office 3 November 1990 – 25 October 1996
- Prime Minister: Gro Harlem Brundtland
- Preceded by: Eleonore Bjartveit
- Succeeded by: Turid Birkeland

Åse Maria Kleveland (born 18 March 1949) is a Norwegian singer, guitarist, politician and activist. She represented Norway in the Eurovision Song Contest 1966 with the entry "Intet er nytt under solen".

A well-known folk singer and traditional guitarist in Norway, she was appointed Minister of Culture in Norway in 1990, and held the position until 1996, representing the Labour Party under the Gro Harlem Brundtland administration. She was also president of the Swedish Film Institute from 1999 to 2006.

In June 2007, she became chairperson of the board of the Human-Etisk Forbund, the Norwegian humanist organization, a position she held until 2013.

== Early and personal life ==
Kleveland was born on 18 March 1949, in Stockholm, to Eva Hansson, a bookkeeper from Sweden, and Olaf Kleveland, a civil engineer from Norway who had fled to Sweden in 1943 because of the Nazi occupation and found refuge with relatives. In 1957, Kleveland and her family moved to Romerike, northeast of Oslo, where her father got a job working at the Institute for Atomic Energy.

In a 1977 interview, she describes how her parents shared equally in the household chores and that she and her husband Svenolov Ehrén, a Swedish artist, did the same. She is currently married to film director and cinematographer Oddvar Bull Tuhus.

Kleveland is fluent in Norwegian, Swedish, Danish, English, French and Japanese. She studied law at the University of Oslo.

== Musical career ==
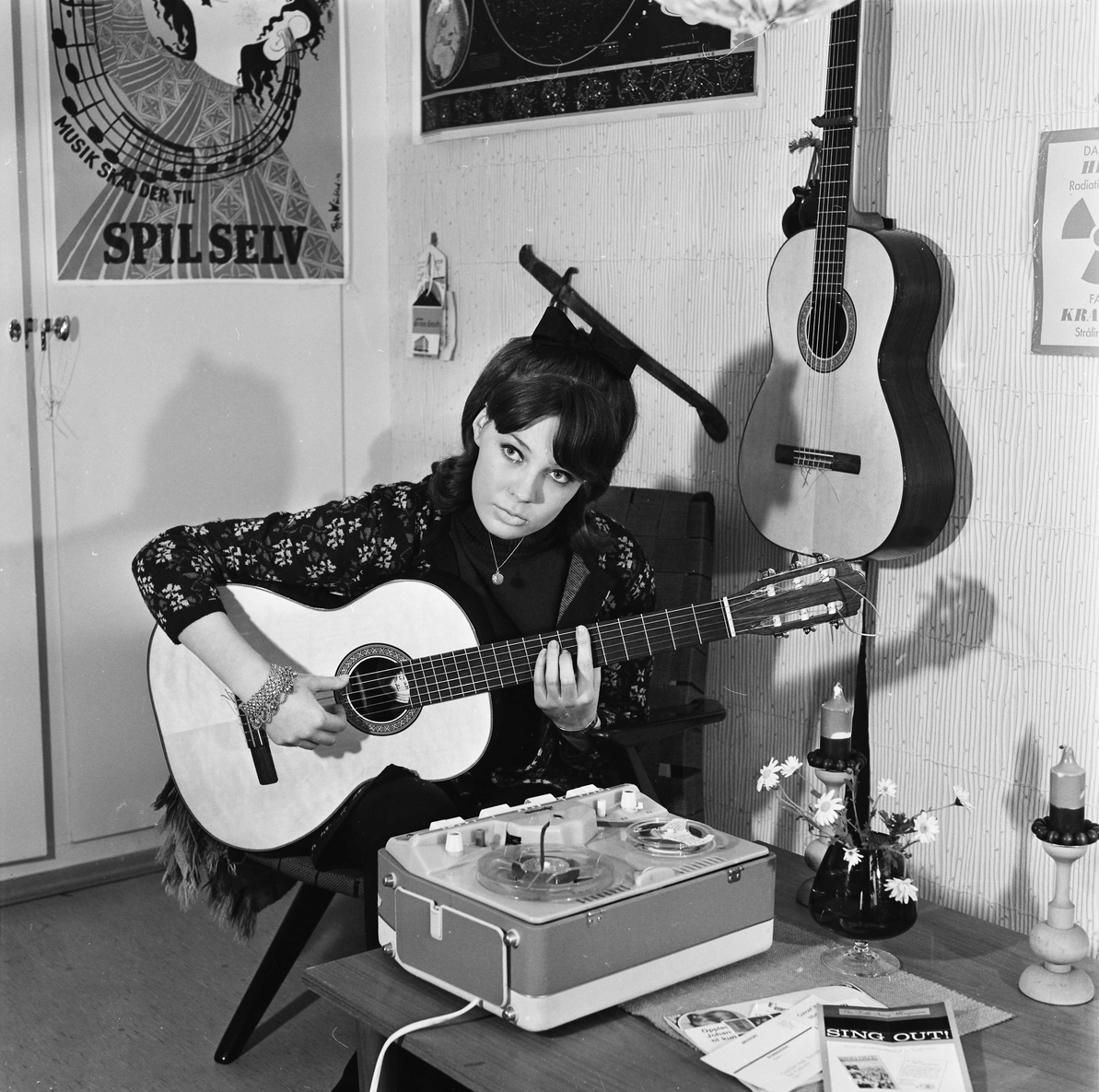
Kleveland performing in 1966

As a singer she is famous for her very dark, soulful voice. She also plays the guitar and has composed songs in the singer-songwriter tradition. She was also part of the vispop group Ballade!.

She began playing classical guitar at eight; at 10 she debuted in a radio show. Her first bout as a vispop singer was on an Erik Bye show when she was 13, and she released her first album in 1965. With her second album in 1966 she was one of the pioneers ushering in the new vispop genre, a blend of traditional folk song and pop. This led to a series of engagements in Paris, and a period of commuting between these Paris performances and her secondary school in Lillestrøm, north of Oslo. At age 17 she conducted a major tour of Japan which included several TV shows and the release of four singles in Japanese. She released her final solo album in 1973 and has released 13 singles for the Scandinavian and German markets.

In 1966, she represented Norway in the Eurovision Song Contest with the entry "Intet er nytt under solen" (There's Nothing New Under The Sun), finishing in third place. She broke a tradition expected of female performers at the time in that she was the first woman to not wear a dress, choosing a pantsuit instead.

She had a long association with the Norwegian Association of Musicians, first holding the office of secretary from 1979 to 1983, then serving as their leader from 1983 to 1987. She was also the President of the Musicians' Union from 1983 to 1986 and their Vice-President from 1986 to 1987.

In 1986, she hosted the first Eurovision Song Contest to be held in Norway in Bergen following Bobbysocks' victory in 1985, having previously introduced the Norwegian entry on camera at the 1980 contest.

== Books ==
- Kleveland, Åse; Ehrén, Svenolov (illus.) (1984). Fredmans epistlar & sånger [The songs and epistles of Fredman]. Stockholm: Informationsförlaget. ISBN 91-7736-059-1. (with facsimiles of Carl Michael Bellman's sheet music from first editions of the 1790 Fredmans epistlar and the 1791 Fredmans sånger)

== See also ==
- List of Eurovision Song Contest presenters

Political offices
Preceded by Eleonore Bjartveit	Norwegian Minister of Culture; 1990–1996	Succeeded by Turid Birkeland
Media offices
Preceded by Kirsti Sparboe with "Karusell"	Norway in the Eurovision Song Contest; 1966	Succeeded by Kirsti Sparboe with "Dukkemann"
Preceded by (Sweden) Lill Lindfors	Eurovision Song Contest presenter 1986	Succeeded by (Belgium) Viktor Lazlo
