= Ordet (magazine) =

Quarterly magazine in Norway

- Former editors: André Bjerke; Lars Roar Langslet
- Frequency: Quarterly
- Founder: André Bjerke
- First issue: 1950
- Country: Norway
- Based in: Oslo
- Language: Norwegian
- ISSN: 0030-4522
- OCLC: 467860887

Ordet (Norwegian: The Word) is a Norwegian language quarterly magazine published by Riksmål Society, a language policy organization, since 1950 with an interruption in the period 1974–1991. The magazine is headquartered in Oslo, Norway.

== History and profile ==
Ordet was started by Riksmål Society as a monthly magazine in 1950. The founder was the Norwegian poet André Bjerke who also edited the magazine. Its subtitle was Tidsskrift for fri sprogutvikling. In 1974 the magazine ceased publication, but was restarted as a quarterly magazine in 1991. Lars Roar Langslet, former minister of culture, was one of the editors of Ordet.
