= Aase Bjerkholt =

Norwegian politician (1915–2012)

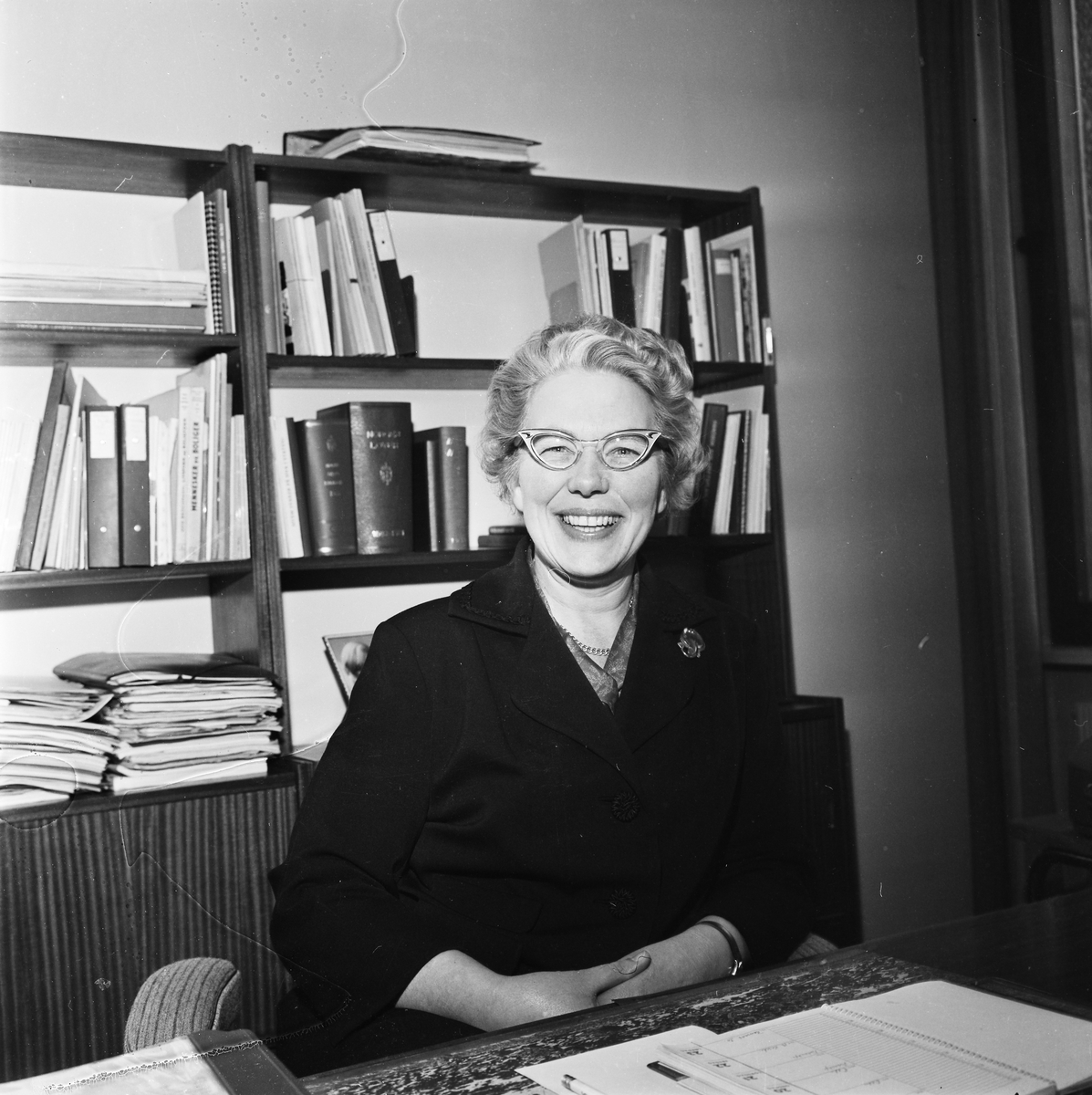

Minister of Family and Consumer Affairs
- In office 25 September 1963 – 12 October 1965
- Prime Minister: Einar Gerhardsen
- Preceded by: Karen Grønn-Hagen
- Succeeded by: Elsa Skjerven
- In office 1 August 1955 – 28 August 1963
- Prime Minister: Einar Gerhardsen
- Preceded by: Position established
- Succeeded by: Karen Grønn-Hagen

Personal details
- Born: Aase Ingerid Nathalie Bjerkholt; 16 January 1915 Oslo, Norway
- Died: 17 August 2012 (aged 97) Oslo, Norway
- Party: Labour

Aase Ingerid Nathalie Bjerkholt (16 January 1915 – 17 August 2012) was a Norwegian politician for the Labour Party. She was born in Oslo.

She was consultative councillor of state for family and consumer affairs during the third cabinet Gerhardsen in 1955–1956, and became the first Minister of Family and Consumer Affairs in 1956. She held the post until 1965, except for one month in 1963 during the cabinet Lyng. From January to February 1963 she was also caretaking Minister of Social Affairs.

She was elected to the Norwegian Parliament from Oslo in 1958, and was re-elected on three occasions. On the local level she was a member of Oslo city council from 1945 to 1947.

Political offices
Preceded by position created	Norwegian Minister of Family and Consumer Affairs; 1956–1963	Succeeded by Karen Grønn-Hagen
Preceded by Karen Grønn-Hagen	Norwegian Minister of Family and Consumer Affairs; 1963–1965	Succeeded by Elsa Skjerven
