= Solveig Sollie =

Norwegian politician

Minister of Family and Consumer Affairs
- In office 1 January 1990 – 3 November 1990
- Prime Minister: Jan P. Syse
- Preceded by: none
- Succeeded by: Matz Sandman

Minister of Administration and Consumer Affairs
- In office 16 October 1989 – 1 January 1990
- Prime Minister: Jan P. Syse
- Preceded by: Oddrunn Pettersen
- Succeeded by: none

Personal details
- Born: 19 April 1939 (age 87) Sørum, Norway
- Party: Christian People’s Party

Solveig Sollie (born 19 April 1939) is a Norwegian politician for the Christian People's Party, who served as parliamentary representative for Telemark 1985–1993. She was also Minister of Administration and Consumer Affairs (consumer affairs) in 1989, and Minister of Family and Consumer Affairs in 1990. From 1998-2004, she served as the County Governor of Telemark.

Government offices
Preceded by Kjell Bohlin	County Governor of Telemark; 1998–2004	Succeeded by Kari Nordheim-Larsen (Arne Malme was acting governor from 2004-2006)
Political offices
New ministerial post	Norwegian Minister of Family and Consumer Affairs; 1990	Succeeded by Matz Sandman
Preceded by Oddrunn Pettersen	Norwegian Minister of Administration and Consumer Affairs; 1989	Position abolished
