= Minister of Culture and Equality =

Norwegian cabinet minister

Minister of Culture and Equality of Norway
- Kultur- og likestillingsministeren

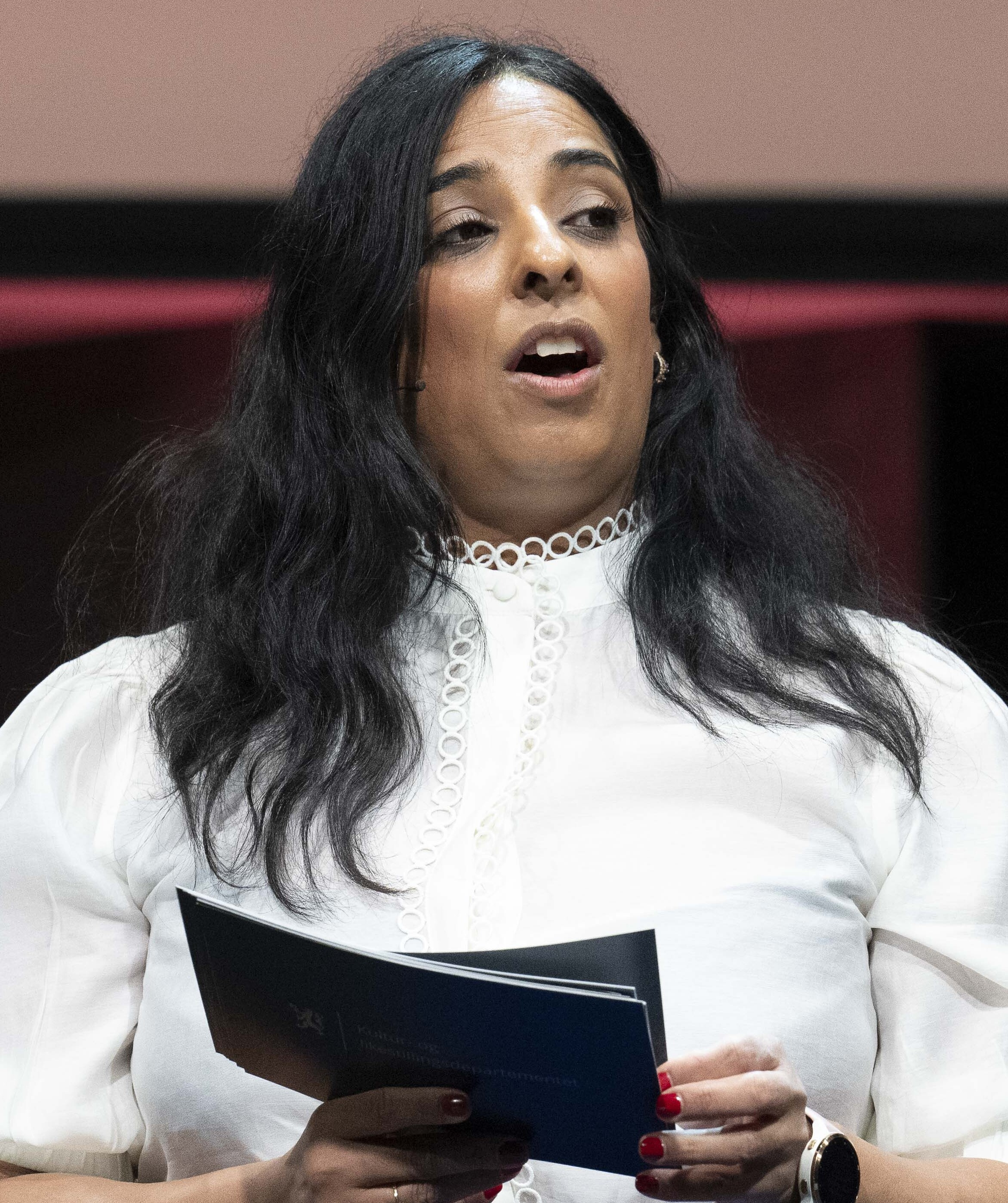
- Incumbent; Lubna Jaffery since 28 June 2023
- Ministry of Culture and Equality
- Member of: Council of State
- Seat: Oslo
- Nominator: Prime Minister of Norway
- Appointer: Monarch with approval of Parliament
- Term length: No fixed length
- Constituting instrument: Constitution of Norway
- Precursor: Minister of Church Affairs and Education
- Formation: 14 October 1981
- First holder: Lars Roar Langslet
- Deputy: State secretaries at the Ministry of Culture and Equality
- Website: Official website

The Minister of Culture and Equality (Norwegian: Kultur- og likestillingsminister; sometimes just kulturminister or likestillingsminister depending on context) is a councilor of state and chief of the Norway's Ministry of Culture and Equality. The ministry is responsible for the government's policy related to culture, church affairs, religion, media, sports and gambling. Subordinate agencies include the Gaming and Foundation Authority, the National Archival Services, the National Library, the Arts Council and the Media Authority. The portfolio includes issues related to the Church of Norway.

The position was created as the Minister of Culture and Sciences in 1981, resulting in a split of the responsibilities of the former Minister of Church Affairs and Education, where issues related to culture and research were moved to the new post. Science issues remained part of the portfolio until 1989, when they were swapped with religious issues with the Minister of Education and Research, creating the Minister of Culture and Church Affairs. This lasted for a year, when church and religious affairs were again resumed by the Minister of Education, Research and Church Affairs. This situation was retained until 2001, when the portfolio again became the Minister of Culture and Church Affairs. From 2009 the "Church Affairs" was transferred to the Ministry of Government Administration, Reform and Church Affairs as minister Anniken Huitfeldt was not a member of the Church of Norway. Issues related to religion remained within the portfolio.

When Solberg's Cabinet took office in 2013 church affairs was again included in the title and portfolio but with less significance than previously due to the increased autonomy given to the Church of Norway in 2012.

The current minister is Lubna Jaffery who took the position in June 2023.

== Key ==
The following lists the minister, their party, date of assuming and leaving office, their tenure in years and days, and the cabinet they served in.

Centre Party
Christian Democratic Party
Conservative Party
Labour Party
Liberal Party

== Ministers ==
| Photo | Name | Party | Took office | Left office | Tenure | Cabinet | Ref |
|---|---|---|---|---|---|---|---|
| | Lars Roar Langslet | Conservative | 14 October 1981 | 9 May 1986 | 4 years, 207 days | Willoch I-II | |
| | Hallvard Bakke | Labour | 9 May 1986 | 16 October 1989 | 3 years, 160 days | Brundtland II | |
| | Eleonore Bjartveit | Christian Democratic | 16 October 1989 | 3 November 1990 | 1 year, 18 days | Syse | |
| | Åse Kleveland | Labour | 3 November 1990 | 25 October 1996 | 5 years, 357 days | Brundtland III | |
| | Turid Birkeland | Labour | 25 October 1996 | 17 October 1997 | 357 days | Jagland | |
| | Anne Enger Lahnstein | Centre | 17 October 1997 | 8 October 1999 | 1 year, 356 days | Bondevik I | |
| | Åslaug Haga | Centre | 8 October 1999 | 17 March 2000 | 161 days | Bondevik I | |
| | Ellen Horn | Labour | 17 March 2000 | 19 October 2001 | 1 year, 216 days | Stoltenberg I | |
| | Valgerd Svarstad Haugland | Christian Democratic | 19 October 2001 | 17 October 2005 | 3 years, 364 days | Bondevik II | |
| | Trond Giske | Labour | 17 October 2005 | 20 October 2009 | 4 years, 3 days | Stoltenberg II | |
| | Anniken Huitfeldt | Labour | 20 October 2009 | 21 September 2012 | 2 years, 335 days | Stoltenberg II | |
| | Hadia Tajik | Labour | 21 September 2012 | 16 October 2013 | 1 year, 26 days | Stoltenberg II | |
| | Thorhild Widvey | Conservative | 16 October 2013 | 16 December 2015 | 2 years, 61 days | Solberg | |
| | Linda Hofstad Helleland | Conservative | 16 December 2015 | 17 January 2018 | 2 years, 32 days | Solberg | |
| | Trine Skei Grande | Liberal | 17 January 2018 | 24 January 2020 | 2 years, 7 days | Solberg | |
| | Abid Raja | Liberal | 24 January 2020 | 14 October 2021 | 1 year, 263 days | Solberg | |
| | Anette Trettebergstuen | Labour | 14 October 2021 | 28 June 2023 | 1 year, 257 days | Støre | |
| | Lubna Jaffery | Labour | 28 June 2023 | present | 3 years, 71 days | Støre | |
