= Lars Roar Langslet =

Norwegian politician (1936–2016)

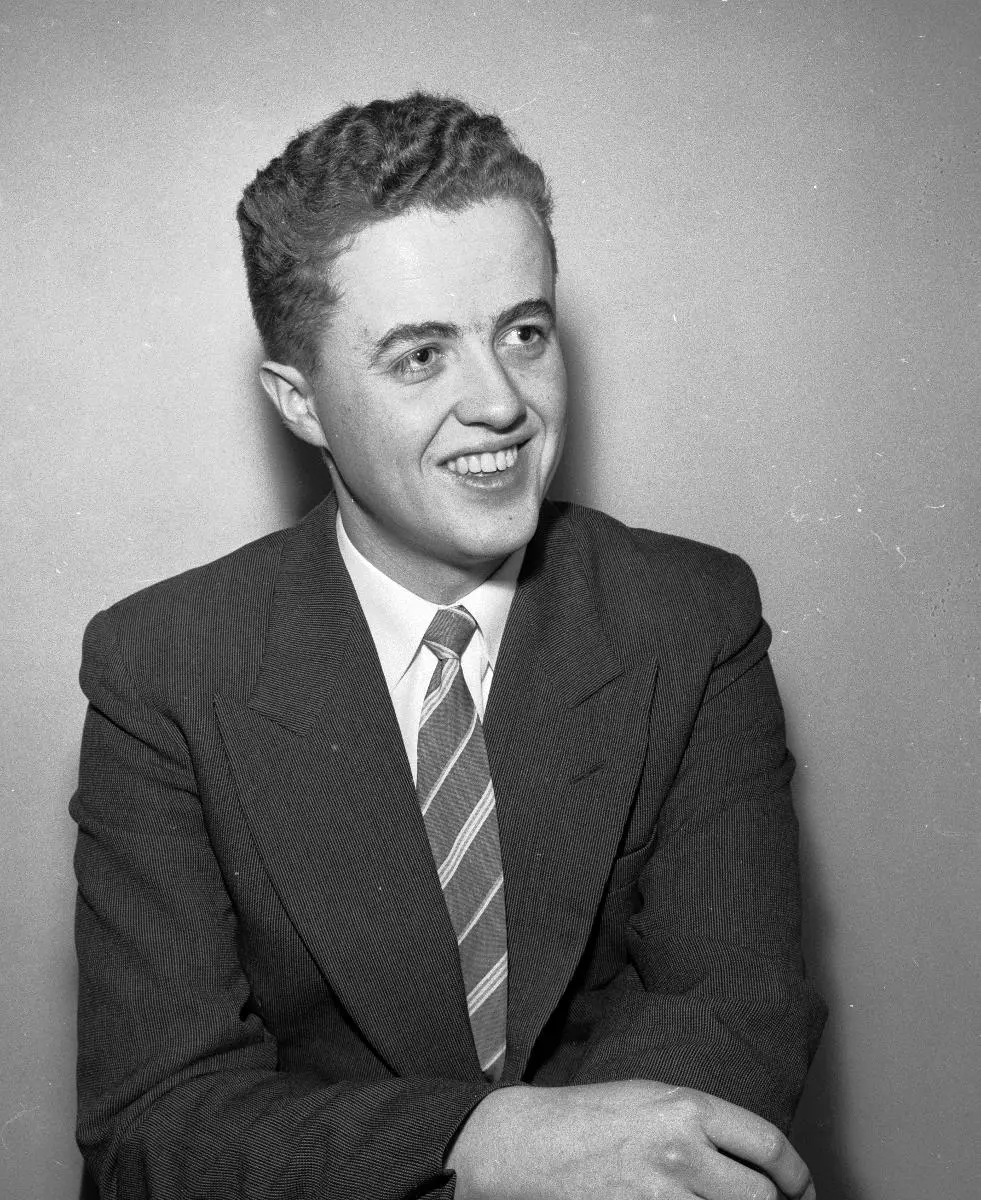
Image of Lars Roar Langslet

Lars Roar Langslet (5 March 1936, Nes, Buskerud – 18 January 2016) was the Norwegian Minister of Education and Church Affairs (culture and science affairs only, not church affairs) in 1981, and Minister of Culture and Science from 1982 until 1986 for the Conservative Party.

As Norway has a Lutheran State Church, his ministry had to be divided, since Langslet was a converted Catholic, and hence could not be in charge of the affairs of the state church.

He was a member of the Norwegian Academy for Language and Literature. In 1984 he received the Fritt Ord Honorary Award.

He was appointed a government scholar in 1997. He was one of the editors of Ordet, a quarterly magazine published by Riksmål Society.

Political offices
Preceded by Position established	Norwegian Minister of Culture; 1981–1986	Succeeded by Hallvard Bakke
