= Matz Sandman =

Norwegian politician

Matz Sandman (born 19 January 1948) is a Norwegian politician for the Labour Party. He was Minister of Family and Consumer Affairs 1990–1991, and Minister of Children and Family Affairs in 1991. He earned a degree in economics from the Norwegian School of Economics and Business Administration.

Preceded by Solveig Sollie	Norwegian Minister of Children and Families; 1990–1991	Succeeded by Grete Berget
