= Manuela Ramin-Osmundsen =

French-Norwegian politician

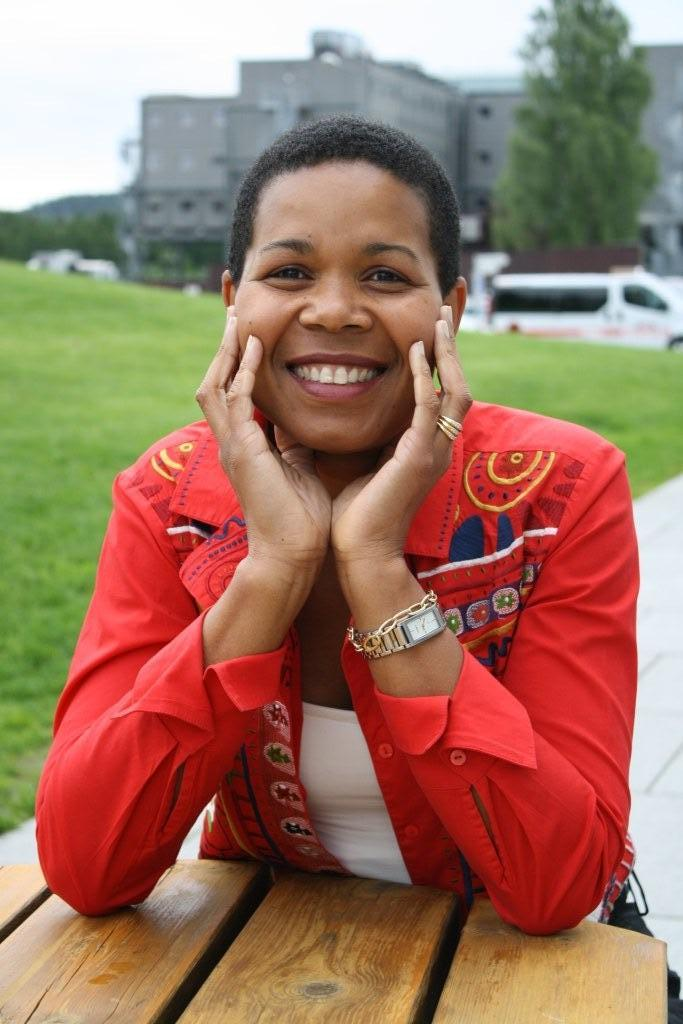

Minister of Children and Equality
- In office 18 October 2007 – 14 February 2008
- Prime Minister: Jens Stoltenberg
- Preceded by: Karita Bekkemellem
- Succeeded by: Anniken Huitfeldt

Personal details
- Born: 15 July 1963 (age 63) Antony, Seine, France
- Party: Labour Party
- Spouse: Terje Osmundsen
- Education: Panthéon-Assas University; Oslo University College

Manuela Myriam Henri Ramin-Osmundsen (born 15 July 1963 in Antony, France) is a French-Norwegian politician and former Minister of Children and Equality from the Labour Party. In 2008 she was the focus of a political scandal that ended with the forced resignation from her newly appointed minister position.

== Early life and education ==
She is born in Antony, then in the Seine department of France, in a family coming from the overseas department Martinique. Her mother, Annie Ramin, is a former director of the Fort-de-France regional university hospital (CHU). She lived in France until 1991, after which she finally settled in Norway with her Norwegian husband. She received a law-degree from the Panthéon-Assas University specializing in European Union law and is a lawyer of the Paris Bar association. She later received a degree in Special Education from the Oslo University College.

== Political career ==
In 1995 she was employed as a lawyer for the Ministry of Justice and the Police, this lasted until 1998 when she became the head of the official Center Against Ethnic Discrimination (SMED), a governmental agency which was to provide free legal-aid to people who were discriminated against. After which she returned to work for the Justice department before switching to work as a political aide in the Ministry of Foreign affairs. In the autumn of 2005 she joined the Labour Party. She was the director of the Norwegian Directorate of Immigration (UID) between 17 March and 21 May 2006.

She was appointed as Minister of Children and Equality Affairs in the second cabinet Stoltenberg on 18 October 2007, replacing outgoing minister Karita Bekkemellem and thus becoming the first ever non-white member of the Norwegian Cabinet.

=== The "Ombudsman-affair" ===
Only four months into her new position she was forced to resign due to the controversy surrounding the appointment of the new Ombudsman for Children in Norway. The incumbent, Reidar Hjermann was expecting to be appointed to a new four-year term as was customary for all ombudsmen at the time. However Ramin-Osmundsen decided to instead award the position to the lawyer Ida Hjort Kraby. Speculations soon arose regarding if this was due to Hjermann being too bothersome for the government (he had publicly criticized the government at numerous occasions). As this story was dying down, a new one erupted when the media discovered that Hjort Kraby and Ramin-Osmundsen were very close friends and had known each other since law-school, and regularly attending each other's parties.

This was in clear violation of government rules, as she was required to recuse herself from the appointment process, when dealing with close relations. After these stories emerged, the Storting opened a formal inquiry into the matter.

Although she initially denied these reports, when confronted with further details she later acknowledged that they were indeed close friends and belonged to the same very small clique of female lawyers living in Oslo's affluent west end. After prime minister Jens Stoltenberg reminded her of the severity of the situation, she resigned as minister on 14 February. Hjort Kraby resigned from her position before even commencing and Hjermann continued as ombudsman.

== Personal life ==
Born a French citizen, Ramin-Osmundsen came to Norway in 1991 and became a Norwegian citizen early October 2007, 14 days before being appointed as minister. She is married to the former Conservative Party politician and businessman Terje Osmundsen.

Political offices
Preceded by Karita Bekkemellem	Norwegian Minister of Children and Equality; 2007–2008	Succeeded by Anniken Huitfeldt
