= Peter Skovholt Gitmark =

Norwegian politician

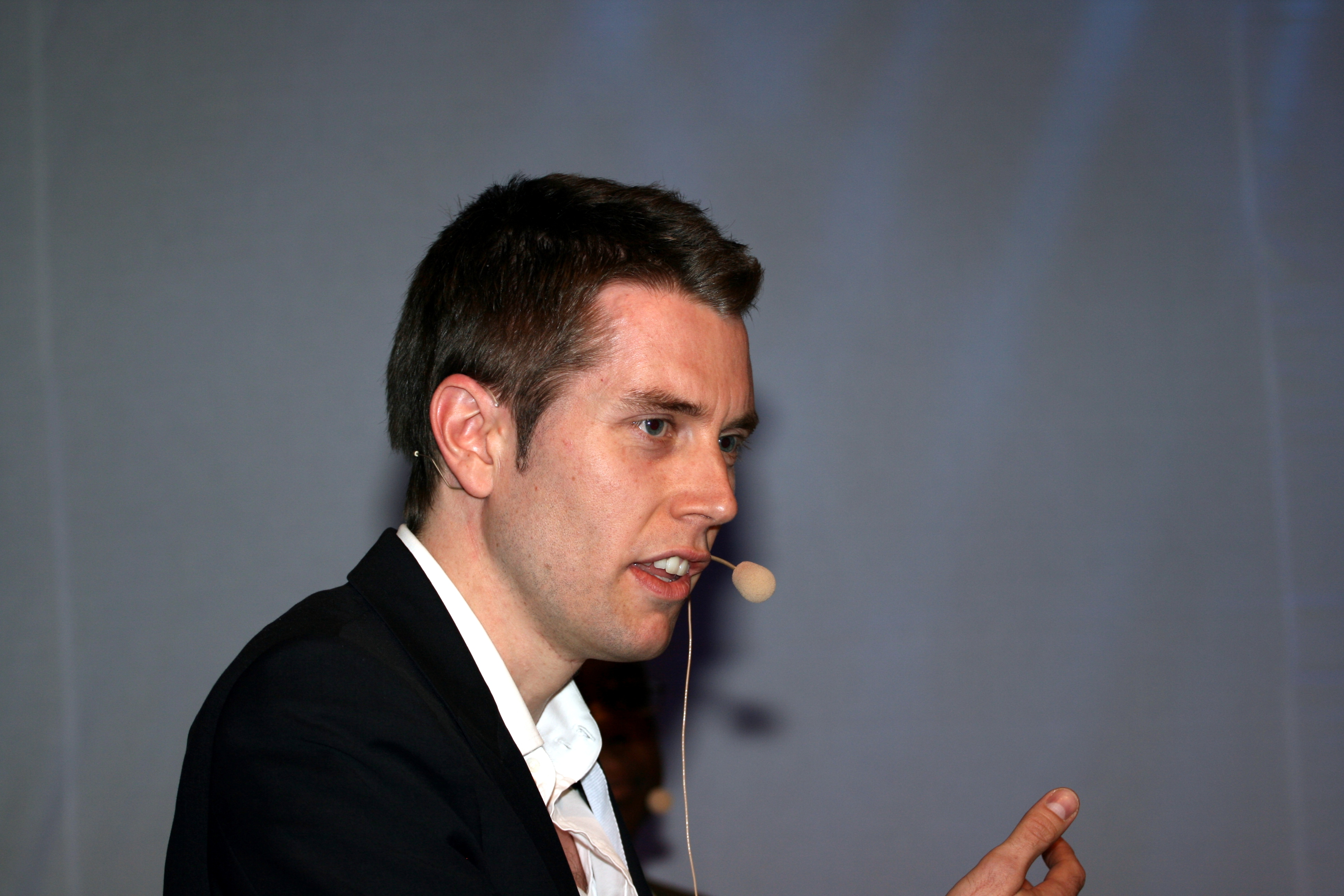
Peter S. Gitmark

Peter Skovholt Gitmark (born 15 April 1977, in Kristiansand) is a Norwegian politician representing the Conservative Party. He is currently a representative of Vest-Agder in the Storting, first elected in 2005. He was elected a reserve candidate in the previous period, but took Ansgar Gabrielsen's place when Gabrielsen was a cabinet minister.

Gitmark is a former chairman of the International Young Democrat Union (2007–2009).

== Education and professional life ==
He has a study qualification from Kristiansand Cathedral School from 1997 and a degree in business economics from the Norwegian School of Economics from 2003. After 12 years as a parliamentary representative, he was associated partner of Amrop AS between 2013 and 2014, which runs business consulting and management recruitment. From 2014 he runs communications consulting with his own company and as senior advisor in the department for public and public relations in Burson-Marsteller AS. From 2013, Gitmark is also chairman of the deepwater technology company Seabed Separation AS in Trondheim.

== Storting committees ==
- 2005–2009 member of the Finance committee.
- 2005–2009 member of the Municipality committee.
