= Hallvard Bakke =

Norwegian politician (1943–2024)

Chair of the Norwegian Broadcasting Cooperation
- In office 2006 – 10 June 2010
- Preceded by: Eldbjørg Løwer
- Succeeded by: William Nygaard

Minister of Culture
- In office 9 May 1986 – 16 October 1989
- Prime Minister: Gro Harlem Brundtland
- Preceded by: Lars Roar Langslet
- Succeeded by: Eleonore Bjartveit

Minister of Trade and Shipping
- In office 15 January 1976 – 8 October 1979
- Prime Minister: Odvar Nordli
- Preceded by: Einar Magnussen
- Succeeded by: Reiulf Steen

Personal details
- Born: 4 February 1943 Flesberg, Buskerud, German-occupied Norway
- Died: 30 June 2024 (aged 81)
- Party: Labour
- Spouse: Gunvor Hals

Hallvard Bakke (4 February 1943 – 30 June 2024) was a Norwegian politician for the Labour Party. He was Minister of Trade and Shipping 1976–1979, and Minister of Culture 1986–1989. From 2006 to 2010, he was the chairman of the Norwegian Broadcasting Corporation. He held a degree from the Norwegian School of Economics.

Bakke died on 30 June 2024, at the age of 81.

Political offices
Preceded by Lars Roar Langslet	Norwegian Minister of Culture; 1986–1989	Succeeded by Eleonore Bjartveit
Preceded by Einar Magnussen	Norwegian Minister of Trade and Shipping; 1976–1979	Succeeded by Reiulf Steen
Media offices
Preceded by Eldbjørg Løwer	Chair of the Norwegian Broadcasting Corporation; 2006–2010	Succeeded by William Nygaard
