= Jagland cabinet =

Government of Norway (1996–1997)

Jagland's Cabinet
- Cabinet of Norway

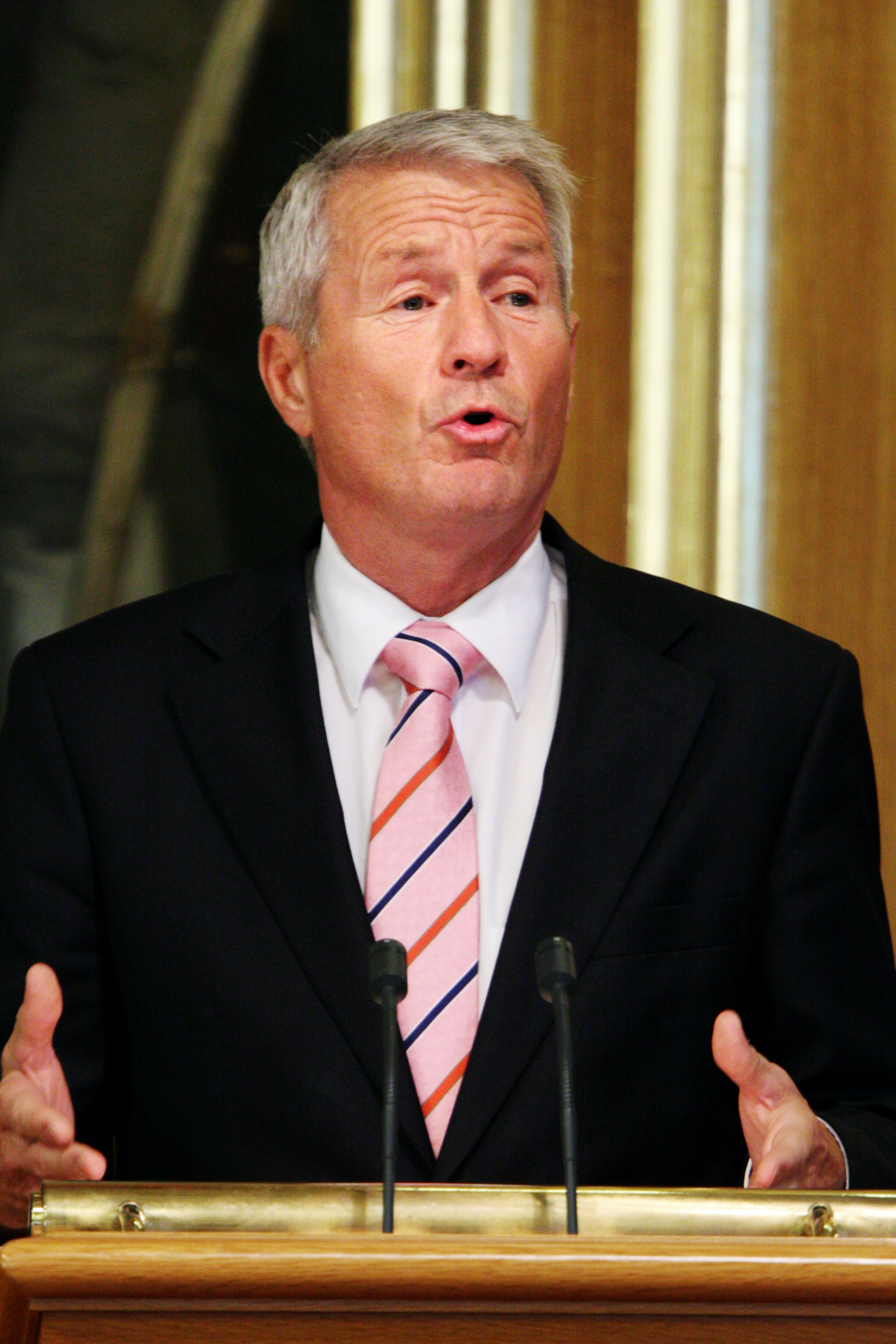
- Date formed: 25 October 1996
- Date dissolved: 17 October 1997

People and organisations
- King: Harald V of Norway
- Prime Minister: Thorbjørn Jagland
- Ministers removed: 3
- Total no. of members: 22
- Member party: Labour Party
- Status in legislature: Minority government
- Opposition parties: Conservative Party; Progress Party; Christian Democratic Party

History
- Election: 1997 parliamentary election
- Outgoing election: 1997 parliamentary election
- Legislature term: 1993-1997
- Predecessor: Brundtland's Third Cabinet
- Successor: Bondevik's First Cabinet

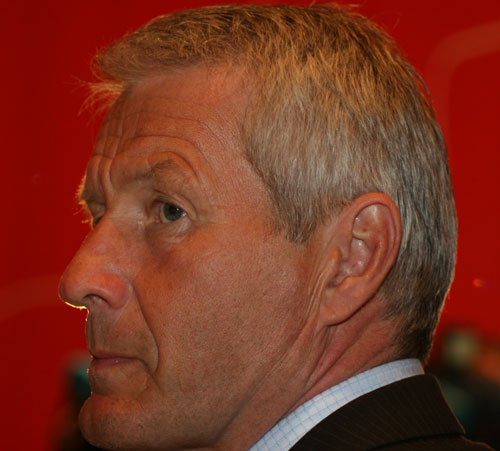
Thorbjørn Jagland, Prime Minister of Norway 1996 – 1997.

Jagland's Cabinet governed Norway between 25 October 1996 and 17 October 1997. It had the following composition:

== Cabinet members ==
Office(s)	Name	Period
Prime Minister	Thorbjørn Jagland	25 October 1996 – 17 October 1997
Minister of Foreign Affairs	Bjørn Tore Godal	25 October 1996 – 17 October 1997
Minister of Defence	Jørgen Hårek Kosmo	25 October 1996 – 17 October 1997
Ministry of Trade and Industry	Grete Knudsen	25 October 1996 – 17 October 1997
Minister of Planning	Terje Rød-Larsen; Bendik Rugaas	25 October 1996 – 29 November; 29 November 1996 – 17 October 1997
Minister of Finance and Customs	Jens Stoltenberg	25 October 1996 – 17 October 1997
Minister of Local Government and Labor	Kjell Opseth	25 October 1996 – 17 October 1997
Minister of Health	Gudmund Hernes	25 October 1996 – 17 October 1997
Minister of Culture	Turid Birkeland	25 October 1996 – 17 October 1997
Minister of Social Affairs	Hill-Marta Solberg	25 October 1996 – 17 October 1997
Minister of Transport and Communications	Sissel Rønbeck	25 October 1996 – 17 October 1997
Minister of Fisheries	Karl Eirik Schjøtt-Pedersen	25 October 1996 – 17 October 1997
Minister of International Development	Kari Nordheim-Larsen	25 October 1996 – 17 October 1997
Minister of the Environment	Thorbjørn Berntsen	25 October 1996 – 17 October 1997
Minister of Agriculture	Dag Terje Andersen	25 October 1996 – 17 October 1997
Minister of Justice and the Police	Anne Holt	25 October 1996 – 4 February 1997
Minister of Justice and the Police	Gerd-Liv Valla	4 February – 17 October 1997
Minister of Children and Equality	Sylvia Brustad	25 October 1996 – 4 February 1997
Minister of Petroleum and Energy	Grete Faremo	25 October – 18 December 1996
Minister of Petroleum and Energy	Ranveig Frøiland	18 December 1996 – 17 October 1997
Minister of Education, Research and Church Affairs	Reidar Sandal	25 October 1996 – 17 October 1997
State Secretaries
Office of the Prime Minister	Terje Moe Gustavsen	25 October – 17 October 1997
Office of the Prime Minister	Norvald Mo	25 October – 17 October 1997
Office of the Prime Minister	Frøy Kannert	1 November 1996 – 17 October 1997
Office of the Prime Minister	Britt Schultz	1 November 1996 – 22 August 1997
Office of the Prime Minister	Sten Helland	27 June – 17 October 1997
Minister of Foreign Affairs	Jan Egeland	25 October – 17 October 1997
Minister of Foreign Affairs	Siri Bjerke	25 October – 17 October 1997
Minister of Foreign Affairs	Frode Forfang	1 November 1996 – 17 October 1997
Minister of Defence	Martin Kolberg	1 November 1996 – 17 October 1997
Ministry of Trade and Industry	Nils Amund Røhne	1 November 1996 – 17 October 1997
Ministry of Trade and Industry	Inger Karin Nerheim	1 November 1996 – 17 October 1997
Ministry of Trade and Industry	Morten Wetland	1 November – 18 December 1996
Ministry of Trade and Industry	Liv Undheim	18 December 1996 – 1 January 1997
Ministry of Labour and Government Administration	Arve Bakke	29 November 1996 – 17 October 1997
Ministry of Finance	Mary Kvidal	1 November 1996 – 17 October 1997
Ministry of Finance	Haktor Helland	1 November 1996 – 29 November 1996
Ministry of Finance	Marianne Andreassen	25 October 1996 – 30 May 1997
Ministry of Finance	Tom Therkildsen	30 May – 3 October 1997
Minister of Local Government and Labor	Jan Petter Rasmussen	1 November 1996 – 1 October 1997
Minister of Local Government and Labor	May Britt Lunde	1 November 1996 – 17 October 1997
Ministry of Social Affairs and Health	Kari Paulsrud	25 October – 17 October 1997
Ministry of Social Affairs and Health	Finn Grønseth	25 October – 17 October 1997
Minister of Culture	Stig Erik Fossum	21 October 1996 – 17 October 1997
Minister of Transport and Communications	Torstein Rudihagen	1 November 1996 – 1 October 1997
Minister of Fisheries	Asbjørn Rasch	1 November 1996 – 1 October 1997
Minister of the Environment	Bernt Øgrim Bull	1 November 1996 – 6 June 1997
Minister of the Environment	Erik Orskaug	6 June – 17 October 1997
Minister of Agriculture	Ottar Befring	25 October – 17 October 1997
Minister of Justice and the Police	Øystein Mæland	1 November 1996 – 27 June 1997
Minister of Justice and the Police	Torolv Groseth	27 June – 17 October 1997
Minister of Justice and the Police	Berit Reiss-Andersen	1 November 1996 – 4 April 1997
Minister of Justice and the Police	Ingunn Yssen	4 April – 17 October 1997
Ministry of Children and Family Affairs	Ingunn Yssen	25 October 1996 – 4 April 1997
Ministry of Children and Family Affairs	Sylfest Lomheim	4 April – 17 October 1997
Minister of Petroleum and Energy	Liv Undheim	1 January – 17 October 1997
Ministry of Church Affairs, Education and Research	Astrid Søgnen	1 November – 17 October 1997
Ministry of Church Affairs, Education and Research	Magnus Midtbø	1 November – 7 February 1996
Ministry of Church Affairs, Education and Research	Per Wøien	7 February – 17 October 1997

Preceded by Third Government of Gro Harlem Brundtland	Norwegian Council of State; 1996–1997	Succeeded by Government of Kjell Magne Bondevik
