= Kjell Bjartveit =

Norwegian physician and politician

Odd Kjell Bjartveit (14 August 1927 – 22 February 2011) was a Norwegian physician and politician for the Christian Democratic Party.

He was born in Flekkefjord, took the cand.med. degree at the University of Oslo in 1951, and the dr.med. degree in 1983. He worked as a chief physician in the Norwegian Mass Radiography Service/National Health Screening Service, a now-defunct organ, from 1968 to 1997. From 1972 to 1973 he was a member of Korvald's Cabinet as a State Secretary in the Norwegian Ministry of Foreign Affairs.

He chaired the National Council on Smoking and Health from 1971, and Oslo Inner Mission from 1971 to 1981. He was also the director of the National Association for Public Health from 1997 to 2001, expert advisor to the World Health Organization, president of the International Union Against Tuberculosis and Lung Disease in 1999 and 2000, and president of the Governing Council of the International Non-Governmental Coalition Against Tobacco.

He was married to Eleonore Bjartveit.
