= Eleonore Bjartveit =

Norwegian politician (1924–2002)

Elonore Bjartveit

Minister of Culture
- In office 16 October 1989 – 3 November 1990
- Prime Minister: Jan P. Syse
- Preceded by: Hallvard Bakke
- Succeeded by: Åse Kleveland

Member of the Norwegian Parliament
- In office 1 October 1989 – 30 September 1993
- Constituency: Oslo

Deputy Member of the Norwegian Parliament
- In office 1 October 1981 – 30 September 1989
- Constituency: Oslo

Personal details
- Born: 11 July 1924 Alta, Finnmark, Norway
- Died: 26 September 2002 (aged 78) Oslo, Norway
- Party: Christian Democratic
- Spouse: Kjell Bjartveit

Eleonore Bjartveit (11 July 1924 – 26 September 2002) was a Norwegian politician for the Christian Democratic Party. Born in Alta, she worked as a medical doctor for several years, before entering politics. Bjartveit was elected to the Norwegian Parliament from Oslo in 1989, serving until 1993. She had previously been a deputy representative from 1981–1989, as well as Minister of Culture and Science in 1989, and Minister of Culture and Church Affairs in 1990.

She was married to Kjell Bjartveit.

Political offices
Preceded by Hallvard Bakke	Norwegian Minister of Culture; 1989–1990	Succeeded by Åse Kleveland
