= Minister of Education (Norway) =

Norwegian cabinet position

Minister of Education of Norway
- Kunnskapsminister

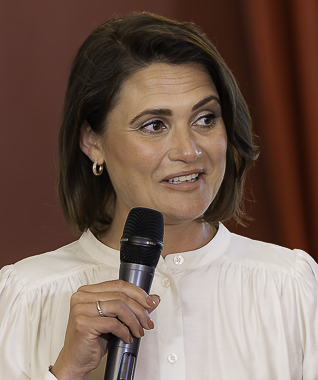
- Incumbent; Kari Nessa Nordtun since 16 October 2023
- Ministry of Education and Research
- Member of: Council of State
- Seat: Oslo
- Nominator: Prime Minister
- Appointer: Monarch; With approval of Parliament
- Term length: No fixed length
- Constituting instrument: Constitution of Norway
- Formation: 30 November 1814
- First holder: Niels Treschow
- Deputy: State secretaries for the Minister of Education
- Website: Official website

The Minister of Education (Norwegian: Kunnskapsminister) is a councilor of state in the Ministry of Education and Research. The incumbent minister is Kari Nessa Nordtun of the Labour Party who has served since October 2023.

The position was created on 30 November 1814 as Minister for the 1st Ministry and has changed name several times throughout its history.

== Ministers ==
Key
Agrarian / Centre Party
Christian Democratic Party
Conservative Party
Free-minded Liberal Party
Independent
Labour Party
Liberal Party
Socialist Left Party

=== Ministers for the 1st Ministry (1814–1819) ===
Photo	Name	Party	Took office	Left office	Tenure	Cabinet
	Niels Treschow	Independent	30 November 1814	15 September 1816	1 year, 290 days	Wedel I
	Christian Krogh	Independent	15 September 1816	15 September 1817	1 year, 0 days	Wedel I
	Niels Treschow	Independent	15 September 1817	1 January 1819	1 year, 108 days	Wedel I

=== Ministers of Education and Church Affairs (1819–1884) ===
Photo	Name	Party	Took office	Left office	Tenure	Cabinet
	Niels Treschow	Independent	1 January 1819	15 October 1819	287 days	Wedel I
	Jonas Collett	Independent	15 October 1819	15 September 1820	336 days	Wedel I
	Niels Treschow	Independent	15 September 1820	9 July 1822	1 year, 297 days	Wedel I
	Poul Christian Holst	Independent	9 July 1822	15 April 1823	280 days	Wedel I
	Niels Treschow	Independent	15 April 1823	28 June 1825	2 years, 74 days	Wedel I
	Poul Christian Holst	Independent	28 June 1825	16 September 1825	80 days	Wedel I
	Christian Adolph Diriks	Independent	16 September 1825	10 November 1836	11 years, 55 days	Wedel I
	Oluf Borch de Schouboe	Independent	10 November 1836	15 December 1836	35 days	Wedel II
	Andreas Arntzen	Independent	15 December 1836	15 June 1837	182 days	Wedel II
	Poul Christian Holst	Independent	15 June 1837	15 September 1839	2 years, 92 days	Wedel II
	Oluf Borch de Schouboe	Independent	15 September 1839	10 October 1840	1 year, 25 days	Wedel II
	Poul Christian Holst	Independent	10 October 1840	15 September 1843	2 years, 340 days	Wedel II
	Oluf Borch de Schouboe	Independent	15 September 1843	15 September 1844	1 year, 0 days	Wedel II
	Poul Christian Holst	Independent	15 September 1844	19 April 1848	3 years, 217 days	Løvenskiold/Vogt
	Hans Riddervold	Independent	19 April 1848	15 September 1849	1 year, 149 days	Løvenskiold/Vogt
	Jørgen Herman Vogt	Independent	15 September 1849	15 September 1850	1 year, 0 days	Løvenskiold/Vogt
	Hans Riddervold	Independent	15 September 1850	7 September 1854	3 years, 357 days	Løvenskiold/Vogt
	Jørgen Herman Vogt	Independent	7 September 1854	7 October 1854	30 days	Løvenskiold/Vogt
	Otto Vincent Lange	Independent	7 October 1854	15 September 1855	343 days	Løvenskiold/Vogt
	Hans Riddervold	Independent	15 September 1855	1 July 1872	16 years, 290 days	Vogt
	Carl Essendrop	Independent	1 July 1872	28 November 1874	2 years, 150 days	F. Stang
	Rasmus Tønder Nissen	Independent	28 November 1874	15 October 1876	1 year, 322 days	F. Stang
	Jens Holmboe	Independent	15 October 1876	15 October 1877	1 year, 0 days	F. Stang
	Rasmus Tønder Nissen	Independent	15 October 1877	11 October 1880	2 years, 362 days	F. Stang
	Jens Holmboe	Independent	11 November 1880	15 October 1881	338 days	Selmer
	Rasmus Tønder Nissen	Independent	15 October 1881	19 January 1882	96 days	Selmer
	Nils Hertzberg	Independent	30 January 1882	21 March 1884	2 years, 51 days	Selmer
	Henrik L. Helliesen	Independent	21 March 1884	3 April 1884	13 days	Selmer
	Nils Hertzberg	Independent	3 April 1884	26 June 1884	84 days	Schweigaard

=== Ministers of Education and Church Affairs (1884–1945) ===
Photo	Name	Party	Took office	Left office	Tenure	Cabinet
	Elias Blix	Liberal	26 June 1884	15 August 1885	1 year, 50 days	Sverdrup
	Jakob Sverdrup	Liberal	15 August 1885	1 November 1886	1 year, 78 days	Sverdrup
	Elias Blix	Liberal	1 November 1886	24 February 1888	1 year, 115 days	Sverdrup
	Jakob Sverdrup	Liberal	24 February 1888	13 July 1889	1 year, 139 days	Sverdrup
	Jacob Aall Bonnevie	Conservative	13 July 1889	6 March 1891	1 year, 236 days	Stang I
	Vilhelm Andreas Wexelsen	Liberal	6 March 1891	15 July 1892	1 year, 131 days	Steen I
	Carl Berner	Liberal	15 July 1892	2 May 1893	291 days	Steen I
	Anton Christian Bang	Conservative	2 May 1893	27 April 1895	1 year, 360 days	Stang II
	Emil Stang	Conservative	27 April 1895	14 October 1895	170 days	Stang II
	Jakob Sverdrup	Liberal	14 October 1895	17 February 1898	2 years, 126 days	Hagerup I
	Vilhelm Andreas Wexelsen	Liberal	17 February 1898	22 October 1903	5 years, 247 days	Steen II; Blehr I
	Hans Nilsen Hauge	Conservative	22 October 1903	11 March 1905	1 year, 140 days	Hagerup II
	Christopher Knudsen	Conservative	11 March 1905	27 January 1906	322 days	Michelsen
	Otto Jensen	Independent	27 January 1906	23 October 1907	1 year, 269 days	Michelsen
	Abraham Berge	Liberal	23 October 1907	19 March 1908	148 days	Løvland
	Karl Seip	Liberal	19 March 1908	8 July 1909	1 year, 111 days	Knudsen I
	Johannes Hougen	Liberal	8 July 1909	2 February 1910	209 days	Knudsen I
	Just Qvigstad	Conservative	2 February 1910	20 February 1912	2 years, 18 days	Konow
	Edvard Liljedahl	Free-minded Liberal	20 February 1912	31 January 1913	346 days	Bratlie
	Aasulv Bryggesaa	Liberal	31 January 1913	26 October 1915	2 years, 296 days	Knudsen II
	Jørgen Løvland	Liberal	26 October 1915	21 June 1920	4 years, 239 days	Knudsen II
	Nils Riddervold Jensen	Conservative	21 June 1920	22 June 1921	1 year, 1 day	Halvorsen I
	Martin Olsen Nalum	Liberal	22 June 1921	6 March 1923	1 year, 257 days	Blehr II
	Ivar B. Sælen	Conservative	6 March 1923	24 November 1923	263 days	Halvorsen II; Berge
	Karl Sanne	Conservative	12 December 1923	25 July 1924	226 days	Berge
	Ivar P. Tveiten	Liberal	25 July 1924	5 March 1926	1 year, 223 days	Mowinckel I
	Wilhelm Christian Magelssen	Conservative	5 March 1926	25 December 1927	1 year, 295 days	Lykke
	Ole Bærøe	Conservative	25 December 1927	28 January 1928	34 days	Lykke
	Olav Steinnes	Labour	28 January 1928	15 February 1928	18 days	Hornsrud
	Sigvald M. Hasund	Liberal	15 February 1928	12 May 1931	3 years, 86 days	Mowinckel II
	Nils Trædal	Agrarian	12 May 1931	3 March 1933	1 year, 295 days	Kolstad; Hundseid
	Knut Liestøl	Liberal	3 March 1933	20 March 1935	2 years, 17 days	Mowinckel III
	Nils Hjelmtveit	Labour	20 March 1935	25 June 1945	10 years, 97 days	Nygaardsvold

=== Ministers of Education and Church Affairs (1945–1990) ===
Photo	Name	Party	Took office	Left office	Tenure	Cabinet
	Kaare Fostervoll	Labour	25 June 1945	28 June 1948	3 years, 3 days	Gerhardsen I-II
	Lars Moen	Labour	28 June 1948	9 December 1953	5 years, 164 days	Gerhardsen II; Torp
	Birger Bergersen	Labour	9 December 1953	23 April 1960	6 years, 136 days	Torp; Gerhardsen III
	Helge Sivertsen	Labour	23 April 1960	28 August 1963	3 years, 127 days	Gerhardsen III
	Olaf Kortner	Liberal	28 August 1963	25 September 1963	28 days	Lyng
	Helge Sivertsen	Labour	25 September 1963	12 October 1965	2 years, 17 days	Gerhardsen IV
	Kjell Bondevik	Christian Democratic	12 October 1965	17 March 1971	5 years, 156 days	Borten
	Bjartmar Gjerde	Labour	17 March 1971	18 October 1972	1 year, 215 days	Bratteli I
	Anton Skulberg	Centre	18 October 1972	16 October 1973	363 days	Korvald
	Bjartmar Gjerde	Labour	16 October 1973	15 January 1976	2 years, 91 days	Bratteli II
	Kjølv Egeland	Labour	15 January 1976	8 October 1979	3 years, 266 days	Nordli
	Einar Førde	Labour	8 October 1979	14 October 1981	2 years, 6 days	Nordli; Brundtland I
	Tore Austad	Conservative	14 October 1981	8 June 1983	1 year, 237 days	Willoch I
	Kjell Magne Bondevik	Christian Democratic	8 June 1983	9 May 1986	2 years, 335 days	Willoch II
	Kirsti Kolle Grøndahl	Labour	9 May 1986	13 June 1988	2 years, 35 days	Brundtland II
	Mary Kvidal	Labour	13 June 1988	16 October 1989	1 year, 125 days	Brundtland II
	Einar Steensnæs	Christian Democratic	16 October 1989	1 January 1990	77 days	Syse

=== Ministers of Education and Research (1990–present) ===
Photo	Name	Party	Took office	Left office	Tenure	Cabinet	Ref
	Einar Steensnæs	Christian Democratic	1 January 1990	3 November 1990	306 days	Syse	
	Gudmund Hernes	Labour	3 November 1990	22 December 1995	5 years, 52 days	Brundtland III	
	Reidar Sandal	Labour	22 December 1995	17 October 1997	1 year, 299 days	Brundtland III; Jagland	
	Jon Lilletun	Christian Democratic	17 October 1997	17 March 2000	2 years, 152 days	Bondevik I	
	Trond Giske	Labour	17 March 2000	19 October 2001	1 year, 216 days	Stoltenberg I	
	Kristin Clemet	Conservative	19 October 2001	17 October 2005	3 years, 363 days	Bondevik II	
	Øystein Djupedal	Socialist Left	17 October 2005	18 October 2007	2 years, 1 day	Stoltenberg II	
	Bård Vegar Solhjell	Socialist Left	18 October 2007	20 October 2009	2 years, 2 days	Stoltenberg II	
	Kristin Halvorsen	Socialist Left	20 October 2009	16 October 2013	3 years, 361 days	Stoltenberg II	
	Torbjørn Røe Isaksen	Conservative	16 October 2013	17 January 2018	4 years, 93 days	Solberg	
	Jan Tore Sanner	Conservative	17 January 2018	24 January 2020	2 years, 7 days	Solberg	
	Trine Skei Grande	Liberal	24 January 2020	13 March 2020	49 days	Solberg	
	Guri Melby	Liberal	13 March 2020	14 October 2021	1 year, 215 days	Solberg	
	Tonje Brenna	Labour	14 October 2021	16 October 2023	2 years, 2 days	Støre	
	Kari Nessa Nordtun	Labour	16 October 2023	present	3 years, 0 days	Støre	

== See also ==
- Minister of Research and Higher Education
