= Berge's Cabinet =

Government of Norway from 1923 to 1924

- Cabinet of Norway

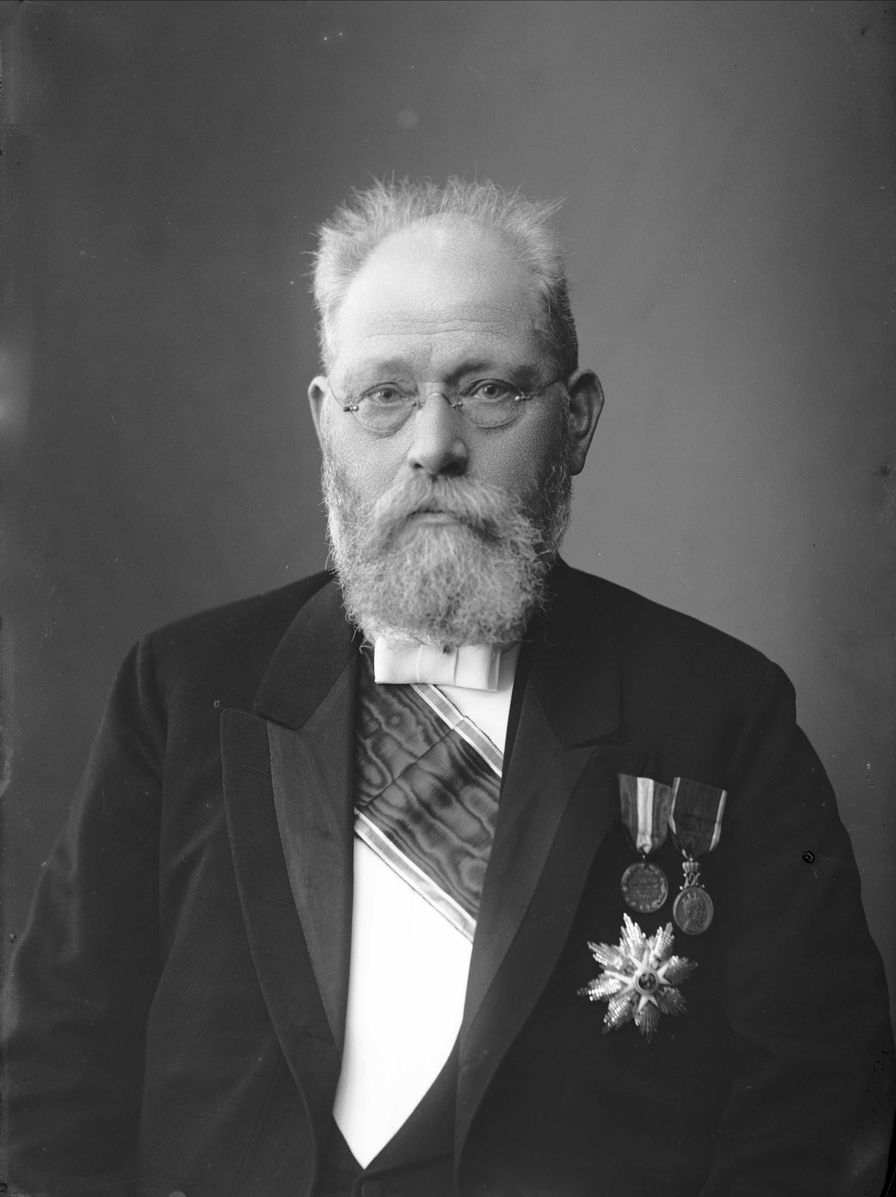
- Prime Minister Abraham Berge.
- Date formed: 30 May 1923
- Date dissolved: 25 July 1924

People and organisations
- Head of state: Haakon VII
- Head of government: Abraham Berge
- No. of ministers: 9
- Member party: Free-minded Liberal Party; Conservative Party
- Status in legislature: Coalition minority government

History
- Legislature term: 1922–1925
- Predecessor: Bahr Halvorsen's Second Cabinet
- Successor: Mowinckel's First Cabinet

Berge's Cabinet was the government of Norway from 30 May 1923 to 25 July 1924. The cabinet was led by Prime Minister Abraham Berge. It succeeded Otto Bahr Halvorsen's second cabinet following his death, and was composed of mostly the same ministers as its predecessor. The cabinet resigned on 23 July 1924, with effect two days later, after not getting wide support in the Storting for an alcohol ban. It was succeeded by Johan L. Mowinckel's first cabinet.

== Cabinet ministers ==
The cabinet stayed mostly intact through Berge's term. The only changes was Christian Lange Rolfsen stepping in as Minister of Justice, and Karl Sanne as Minister of Education and Church Affairs following the death of Ivar B. Sælen in November 1923.

Cabinet
| Portfolio | Minister | Took office | Left office | Party |
|---|---|---|---|---|
| Prime Minister; Minister of Finance and Customs | Abraham Berge | 30 May 1923 | 25 July 1924 | Free-minded Liberal |
| Minister of Foreign Affairs | Christian Fredrik Michelet | 30 May 1923 | 25 July 1924 | Conservative |
| Minister of Justice and the Police | Christian Lange Rolfsen | 30 May 1923 | 25 July 1924 | Conservative |
| Minister of Defence | Karl Wilhelm Wefring | 30 May 1923 | 25 July 1924 | Free-minded Liberal |
| Minister of Agriculture | Anders Venger | 30 May 1923 | 25 July 1924 | Conservative |
| Minister of Education and Church Affairs | Ivar B. Sælen | 30 May 1923 | 24 November 1923 (Note: Died in office.) | Conservative |
| Minister of Education and Church Affairs | Karl Sanne (Note: Anders Venger was acting minister from 24 november to 11 December.) | 12 December 1923 | 25 July 1924 | Conservative |
| Minister of Trade | Johan Henrik Rye Holmboe | 30 May 1923 | 25 July 1924 | Free-minded Liberal |
| Minister of Labour | Cornelius Middelthon | 30 May 1923 | 25 July 1924 | Conservative |
| Minister of Social Affairs | Odd Klingenberg | 30 May 1923 | 25 July 1924 | Conservative |
