= Christine Sagen Helgø =

Norwegian politician (born 1968)

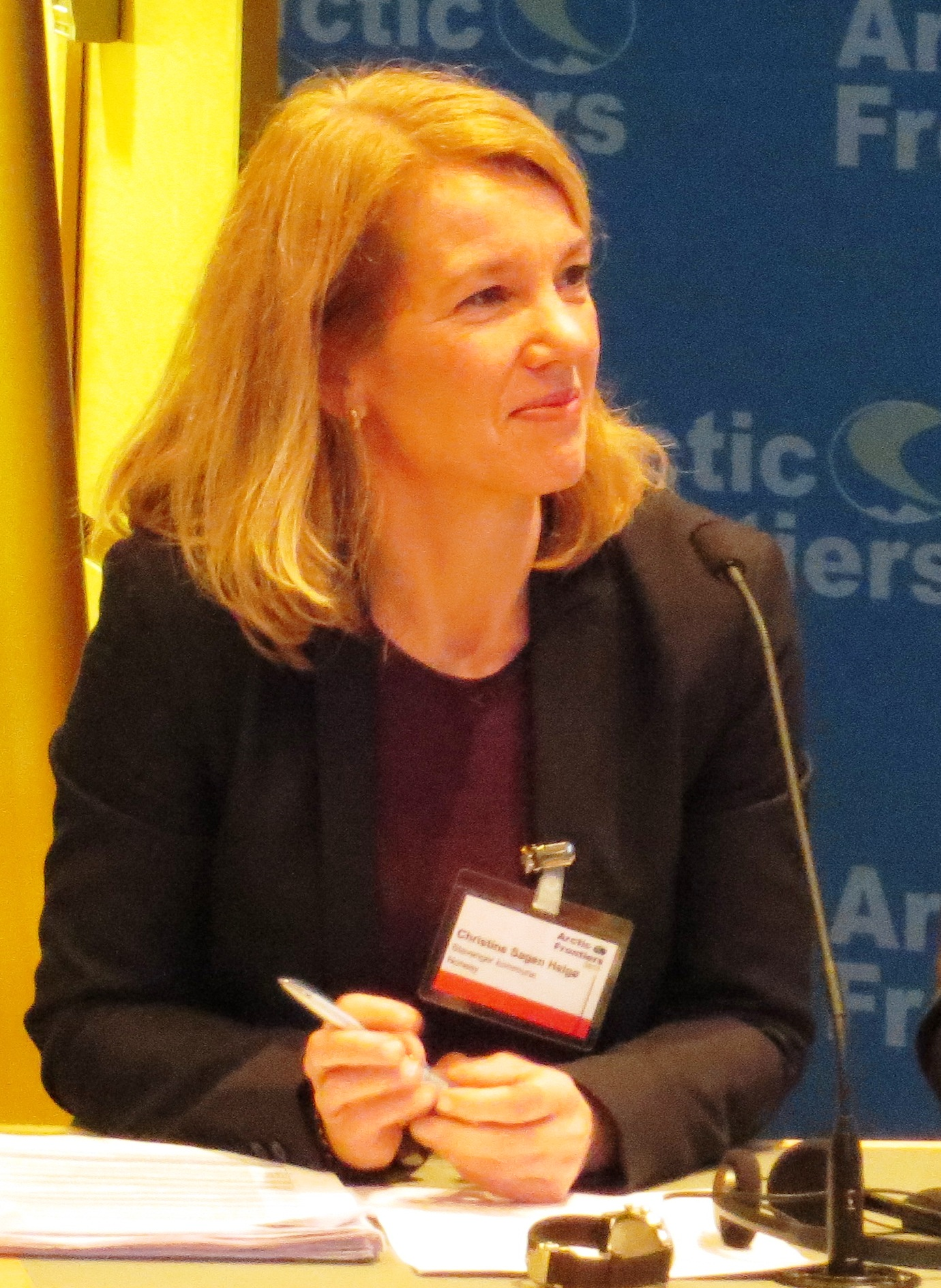
- Christine Sagen Helgø

Mayor of Stavanger
- In office 17 October 2011 – 21 October 2019
- Deputy: Bjørg Tysdal Moe
- Preceded by: Leif Johan Sevland
- Succeeded by: Kari Nessa Nordtun

Personal details
- Born: Christine Sagen; 27 March 1968 (age 58) Holmestrand, Norway
- Party: Conservative
- Spouse: Johan Helgø
- Children: 2

Christine Sagen Helgø (born 27 March 1968 in Holmestrand, Norway) is a Norwegian politician of the Conservative Party who served as mayor of Stavanger Municipality from 2011 to 2019. Sagen Helgø has seen twelve years of Stavanger's politics, the last eight years as group leader of the Stavanger Conservative Party. In 2011, she replaced the former mayor of the same party, Leif Johan Sevland, who held the title for sixteen years.

== Political career ==
=== Mayoralty ===
She was elected as mayor of Stavanger following the 2011 local elections, with the Christin Democrats' Bjørg Tysdal Moe staying on as deputy mayor.

Sagen Helgø was also the president of the World Energy Cities group for the 2014–2016 term.

Sagen Helgøy and Tysdal Moe were re-elected following the 2015 local elections.

Sagen Helgø had supported that the neighbouring Sandnes Municipality and Sola Municipality should be merged with Stavanger. However following the 2016 referendum on municipal mergers, the two municipalities ultimately rejected the proposal.

In August 2018, Sagen Helgø announced that she wouldn't seek re-election at the 2019 local elections. The Conservative block went on to lose the 2019 election to the Labour led coalition, and Kari Nessa Nordtun succeeded her as mayor on 21 October.

== Civic career ==
Following her stint as mayor, Sagen Helgø became the director of investment at Camar AS.

In February 2025, she became the new Rogaland regional leader of the Confederation of Norwegian Enterprise, succeeding Tone Grindland, who became the new director of the Stavanger Concert Hall.

== Personal life ==
She is married to Johan Helgø, with whom she has two children.
