= Eileif Kolsrud =

Norwegian politician

Eileif Kolsrud (8 February 1873 – 1953) was a Norwegian educator and politician for the Labour Party.

He was born at Strandbråten in Sigdal as a son of smallholders Helge Eileifson Kolsrud (1846–1911) and Kjersti Steffensen (1845–1898). He graduated from Asker Seminary in 1894, and was hired as a school teacher in Nes, Buskerud in the same year. He moved on to Håland in 1895, Torsnes in 1897, Glemminge in 1900 and Kristiansund in 1903. In between he had several study trips and leaves, among others at the University of London. In 1920 he was promoted to headmaster in Kristiansund. He managed Kristiansund Technical Evening School from 1920 to 1943 and Nordlandet School from 1924 to 1944.

Here he chaired the local branch of the Labour Party. He was a member of the school board and other municipal committees, and chaired his local trade union. From 1930 to 1939 he was a board member of the Norwegian School Inspector and Manager Association (Norges Skoleinspektør- og Bestyrerforening). From 1912 to 1922 he was a board member of Møre Fylkes Ruteselskap, a company that ran the boat and ferry traffic in mid-Norway. From 1927 to 1944 he was a board member of the Bank of Norway local branch. From 1908 to 1910, he also chaired the regional branch of Det Norske Totalavholdsselskap, the oldest temperance organization in Norway. In 1914 he edited the newspaper Tidens Krav. He was a member of Kristiansund city council from 1907 to 1934, serving as mayor from 1919 to 1921. He served as a deputy representative to the Parliament of Norway during the term 1928–1930, representing the constituency of Market towns of Møre og Romsdal county. While Olav Steinnes was the Minister of Education and Church Affairs in Hornsrud's Cabinet, Kolsrud took Steinnes' parliamentary seat.
