= Lykke's Cabinet =

Post-WW1 Norwegian cabinet

- Cabinet of Norway

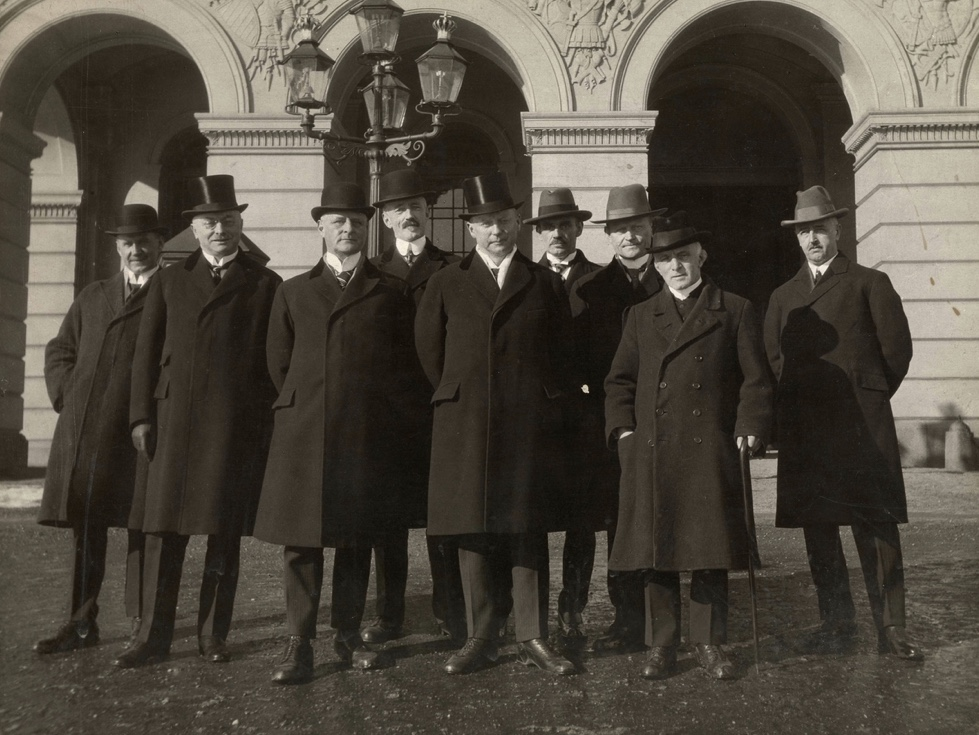
- The cabinet ministers outside the Royal Palace in 1926.
- Date formed: 5 March 1926
- Date dissolved: 28 January 1928

People and organisations
- Head of state: Haakon VII of Norway
- Head of government: Ivar Lykke
- No. of ministers: 9
- Member party: Conservative Party; Free-minded Liberal Party
- Status in legislature: Minority

History
- Incoming formation: Change of government after crisis
- Outgoing formation: 1927 parliamentary election
- Election: 1927 parliamentary election
- Legislature term: 1925–1928
- Predecessor: Mowinckel's First Cabinet
- Successor: Hornsrud's Cabinet

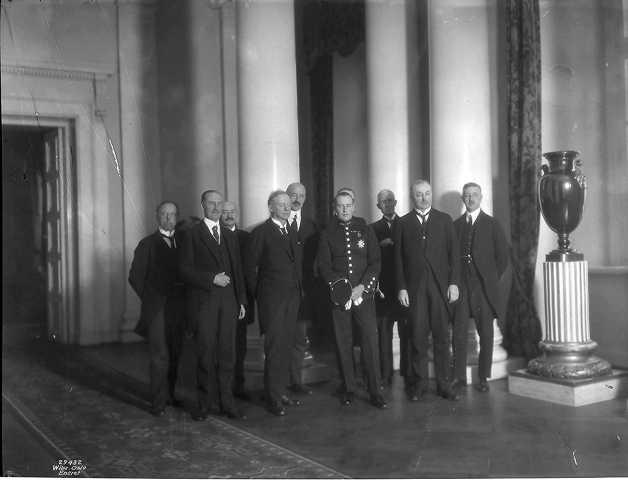
The ministers of Lykke's Cabinet with Crown Prince Olav at the Royal Palace in Oslo.

Lykke's Cabinet was the government of Norway from 5 March 1926 to 28 January 1928. The cabinet was led by Ivar Lykke and was a coalition between the Conservative and Free-minded Liberal Party. It had the following composition:

== Cabinet members ==
Cabinet
Portfolio	Minister	Took office	Left office	Party
Prime Minister; Minister of Foreign Affairs	Ivar Lykke	5 March 1926	28 January 1928	Conservative
Minister of Justice and the Police	Ingolf E. Christensen	5 March 1926	26 July 1926	Conservative
Minister of Justice and the Police	Knud Øyen	26 July 1926	28 January 1928	Conservative
Minister of Finance and Customs	Fredrik Ludvig Konow	5 March 1926	28 January 1928	Free-minded Liberal
Minister of Defence	Karl Wilhelm Wefring	5 March 1926	26 July 1926	Free-minded Liberal
Minister of Defence	Ingolf E. Christensen	26 July 1926	28 January 1928	Conservative
Minister of Agriculture	Ole Bærøe	5 March 1926	28 January 1928	Conservative
Minister of Education and Church Affairs	Wilhelm Magelssen	5 March 1926	25 December 1927	Conservative
Minister of Education and Church Affairs	Ole Bærøe	25 December 1927	28 January 1928	Conservative
Minister of Trade	Charles Robertson	5 March 1926	28 January 1928	Conservative
Minister of Labour	Anders Venger	5 March 1926	26 July 1926	Conservative
Minister of Labour	Worm Darre-Jenssen	26 July 1926	28 January 1928	Conservative
Minister of Social Affairs	Peter A. Morell	5 March 1926	28 January 1928	Conservative

== Secretary to the Council of State ==
- Nicolai Franciscus Leganger
