= Anders Venger =

Norwegian politician

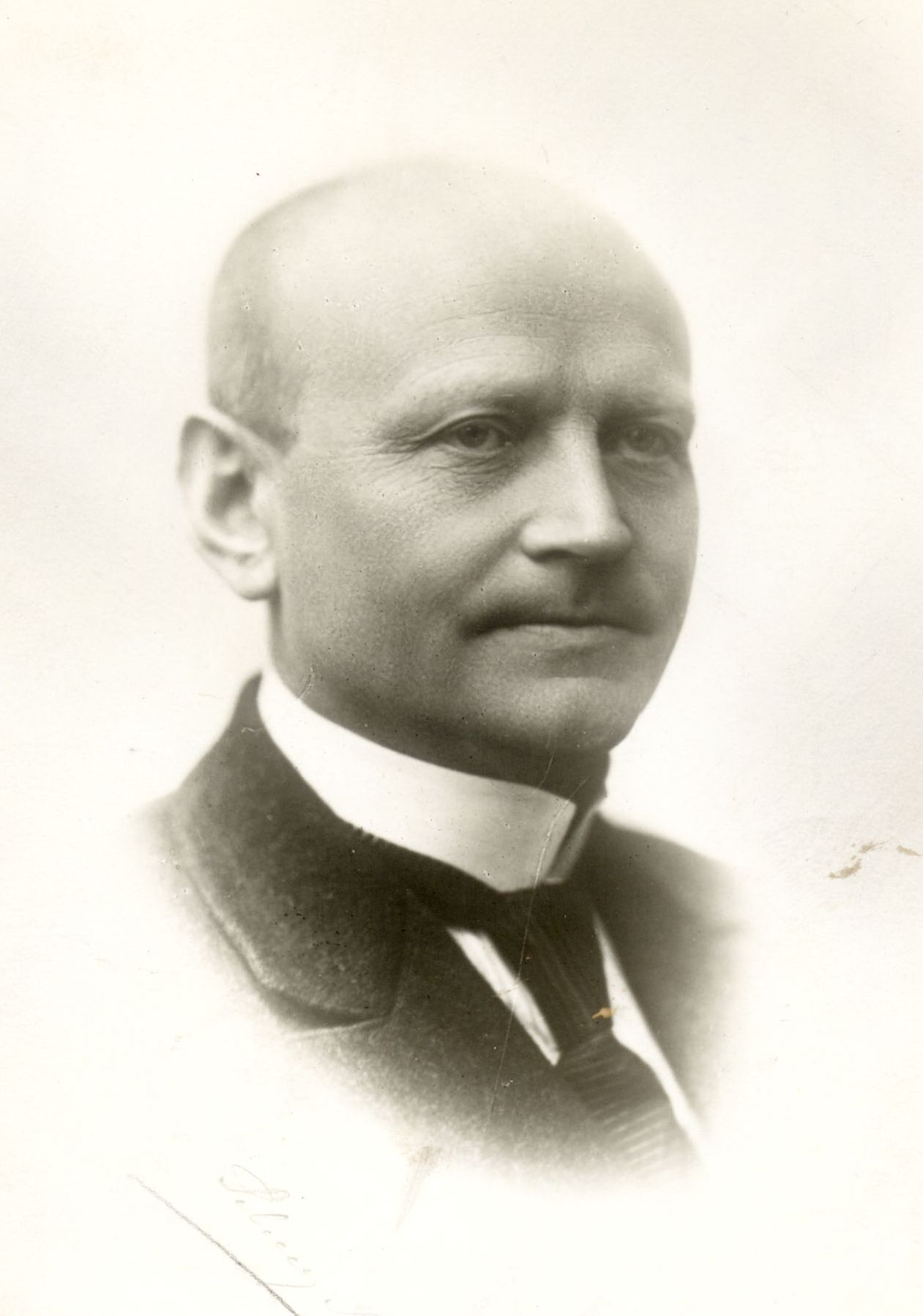
- Parliamentary portrait of Venger.

Minister of Labour
- In office 5 March 1926 – 26 July 1926
- Prime Minister: Ivar Lykke
- Preceded by: Ole Monsen Mjelde
- Succeeded by: Worm Darre-Jenssen

Minister of Agriculture
- In office 6 March 1923 – 25 July 1924
- Prime Minister: Otto B. Halvorsen; Abraham Berge
- Preceded by: Håkon Five
- Succeeded by: Håkon Five

Minister of Education and Church Affairs Acting
- In office 24 November 1923 – 11 December 1923
- Prime Minister: Abraham Berge
- Preceded by: Ivar B. Sælen
- Succeeded by: Karl Sanne

Member of the Norwegian Parliament
- In office 1 January 1919 – 31 December 1927
- Constituency: Akershus

Deputy Leader of the Conservative Party
- In office 1920–1925
- Leader: Otto B. Halvorsen; Ivar Lykke

Personal details
- Born: 5 January 1872 Eidsvoll, Akershus, Sweden-Norway
- Died: 23 February 1935 (aged 63) Oslo, Norway
- Party: Conservative
- Spouse: Dagny Hilsen (m. 1900)
- Children: Hans Venger; Johan Venger

Anders Venger (5 January 1872 – 23 February 1935) was a Norwegian politician of the Conservative Party. He served Minister of Agriculture from 1923 to 1924, Minister of Labour from March to July 1926 and acting Minister of Education and Church Affairs from November to December 1923 following the death of Ivar Bergersen Sælen. He also served as deputy leader of the Conservative Party from 1920 to 1925.

== Early life ==
Anders Venger grew up at Venjerbakken, one of Eidsvoll's oldest properties at the time. The farm was located on the west side of Vorma, close to Eidsvoll Verk and the industrial area Bøn. Venger was the son of Marte Olava Aas (1848–1907) and Johan A. Venger (1846–1921). His father, who had bought Venjerbakken in 1873, was also active in municipal politics in Eidsvoll.

== Politics ==
Venger was elected mayor of Eidsvoll in 1912 and assumed the position in 1913. He held this post for 21 years until 1934, though he was on leave while he served as government minister. He entered the Storting in 1919, elected as a representative from the constituency of Øvre Romerike. He was re-elected until 1927, when he choose not to run for re-election due to the impeachment proceedings against former prime minister Abraham Berge. During that same time frame, he also resigned as Minister of Labour in 1926. Venger had also served as Minister of Agriculture of Otto Bahr Halvorsen's second cabinet and continued in the same post after Abraham Berge took over after Bahr Halvorsen's death in May 1923. As agriculture minister, he was able to pass farmer friendly bill regarding corn arrangements. For many years, Venger was an active member of the Conservative central executive committee, and he also served five years as the party's deputy leader. He was considered to be a part of the party's agrarian wing, whom, during the 1920s, were in conflict with city liberals, where they disagreed on the party's agricultural policy.
