= Treschow =

Treschow may refer to:

- An alternative spelling of Tresckow, a family belonging to the German Uradel
- Treschow (Dano-Norwegian family), a Dano-Norwegian family originally from Næstved in Denmark, the name of which is a corruption of "wooden shoe-maker". It is not related to the German family.
- Treschow (Norwegian family), a Norwegian family from Moss in Norway, which is not known to be related to either family
