= Hasund =

Hasund is a surname. Notable people with the surname include:

- Geir Hasund (born 1971), Norwegian footballer, son of Kjetil
- Kjetil Hasund (born 1942), Norwegian footballer
- Sigvald Hasund (1868–1959), Norwegian academic and politician
- Vilde Hasund (born 1997), Norwegian footballer
