= Mowinckel's First Cabinet =

Government of Norway from 1924 to 1926

Mowinckel's Third Cabinet
- Cabinet of Norway

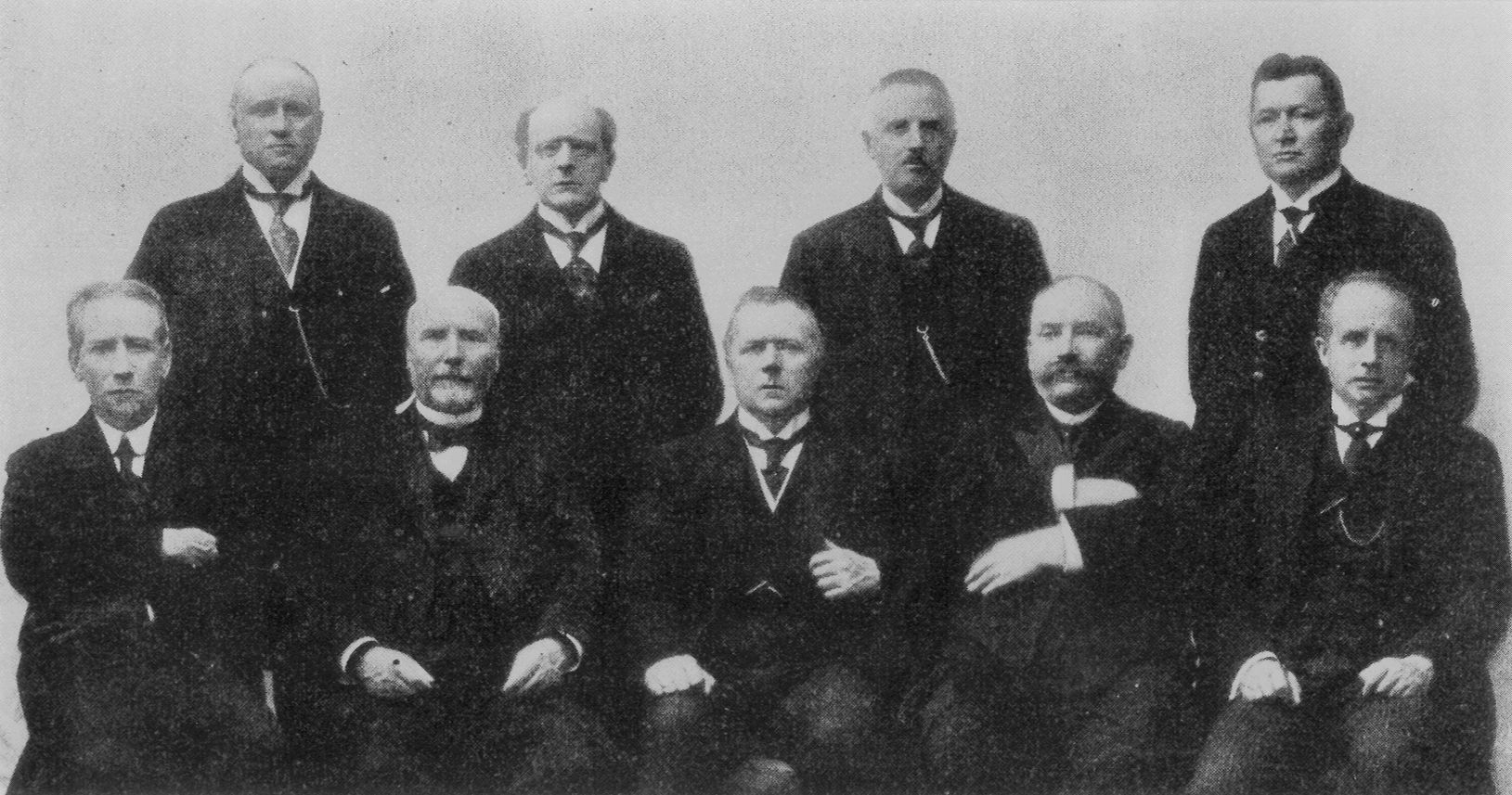
- Front: Five, Petterson Tveiten, Prime Minister Mowinckel, Monsen Mjelde and Meling. Rear: Jacobsen, Oftedal, Holmboe and Berg.
- Date formed: 25 July 1924
- Date dissolved: 5 March 1926

People and organisations
- Head of state: Haakon VII of Norway
- Head of government: Johan Ludwig Mowinckel
- Total no. of members: 9
- Member party: Liberal Party
- Status in legislature: Minority government

History
- Incoming formation: Government crisis
- Outgoing formation: Government crisis
- Election: 1924
- Legislature term: 1925–1928
- Predecessor: Berge's Cabinet
- Successor: Lykke's Cabinet

Mowinckel's First Cabinet governed Norway between 25 July 1924 and 5 March 1926. It had the following composition:

== Cabinet members ==
Cabinet
| Portfolio | Minister | Took office | Left office | Party |
|---|---|---|---|---|
| Prime Minister; Minister of Foreign Affairs | Johan Ludwig Mowinckel | 25 July 1924 | 5 March 1926 | Liberal |
| Minister of Justice and the Police | Paal Berg | 25 July 1924 | 5 March 1926 | Liberal |
| Minister of Finance and Customs | Arnold Holmboe | 25 July 1924 | 5 March 1926 | Liberal |
| Minister of Defence | Rolf Jacobsen | 25 July 1924 | 5 March 1926 | Liberal |
| Minister of Agriculture | Håkon Five | 25 July 1924 | 5 March 1926 | Liberal |
| Minister of Education and Church Affairs | Ivar P. Tveiten | 25 July 1924 | 5 March 1926 | Liberal |
| Minister of Trade | Lars O. Meling | 25 July 1924 | 5 March 1926 | Liberal |
| Minister of Labour | Ole Monsen Mjelde | 25 July 1924 | 5 March 1926 | Liberal |
| Minister of Social Affairs | Lars Oftedal | 25 July 1924 | 5 March 1926 | Liberal |

== Secretary to the Council of State ==
The title was changed from State Secretary to Secretary to the Council of State on 1 January 1926.

| State Secretary | Period |
|---|---|
| Hans Severin Fürst | – 1 October 1925 |
| Nicolai Franciscus Leganger | 1 January 1926 – (acting from 1 October 1925) |
