= Hegdal =

Hegdal is a Norwegian surname. Notable people with the surname include:

- Eirik Hegdal (born 1973), Norwegian musician, composer, arranger, and music teacher
- Sissel Knutsen Hegdal (born 1965), Norwegian politician
