= Norwegian Maritime Authority =

- Type: Government agency
- Industry: Maritime safety
- Headquarters: Haugesund, Norway
- Area served: Norway
- Key people: Knut Arild Hareide (Director General)
- Number of employees: 369 (2026)
- Parent: Norwegian Ministry of Trade and Industry
- Website: www.sjofartsdir.no

The Norwegian Maritime Authority (Norwegian: Sjøfartsdirektoratet) is a Norwegian government agency responsible for life, health, working conditions and the environment for Norwegian registered ships and ships at Norwegian ports. The authority, subordinate to the Norwegian Ministry of Trade and Industry, is located in Haugesund and led by Director General of Shipping and Navigation Olav Akselsen.

The main job for the authority is to ensure that Norwegian ships and shipping companies meet high safety- and environmental standards, to ensure that Norwegian seamen have high qualifications and good working- and living conditions, and to ensure that foreign ships in Norwegian territory and ports meet international rules. The authority also assists the Norwegian Petroleum Safety Authority in matters concerning petroleum activities and also has responsibilities concerning small boats.

In matters concerning environmental quality, the authority is subordinate to the Norwegian Ministry of the Environment. In police- and prosecution concerns it is subordinate of the Norwegian Director of Public Prosecutions.

The Norwegian ship registry NIR / NOR belongs to the Authority and has its headquarter in Bergen.

The agency was established in 1962 in Oslo and moved to Haugesund in 2006 as part of a decentralization program for government agencies.

== Directors ==
Rune Teisland left the director post in 2008. In August the same year, Olav Akselsen, a parliament member at the time, was appointed new Director General. Akselsen did not take up the post until January 2010, and in the meantime Sigurd Gude served as acting director.
