= Olav Akselsen =

Norwegian politician (1965–2021)

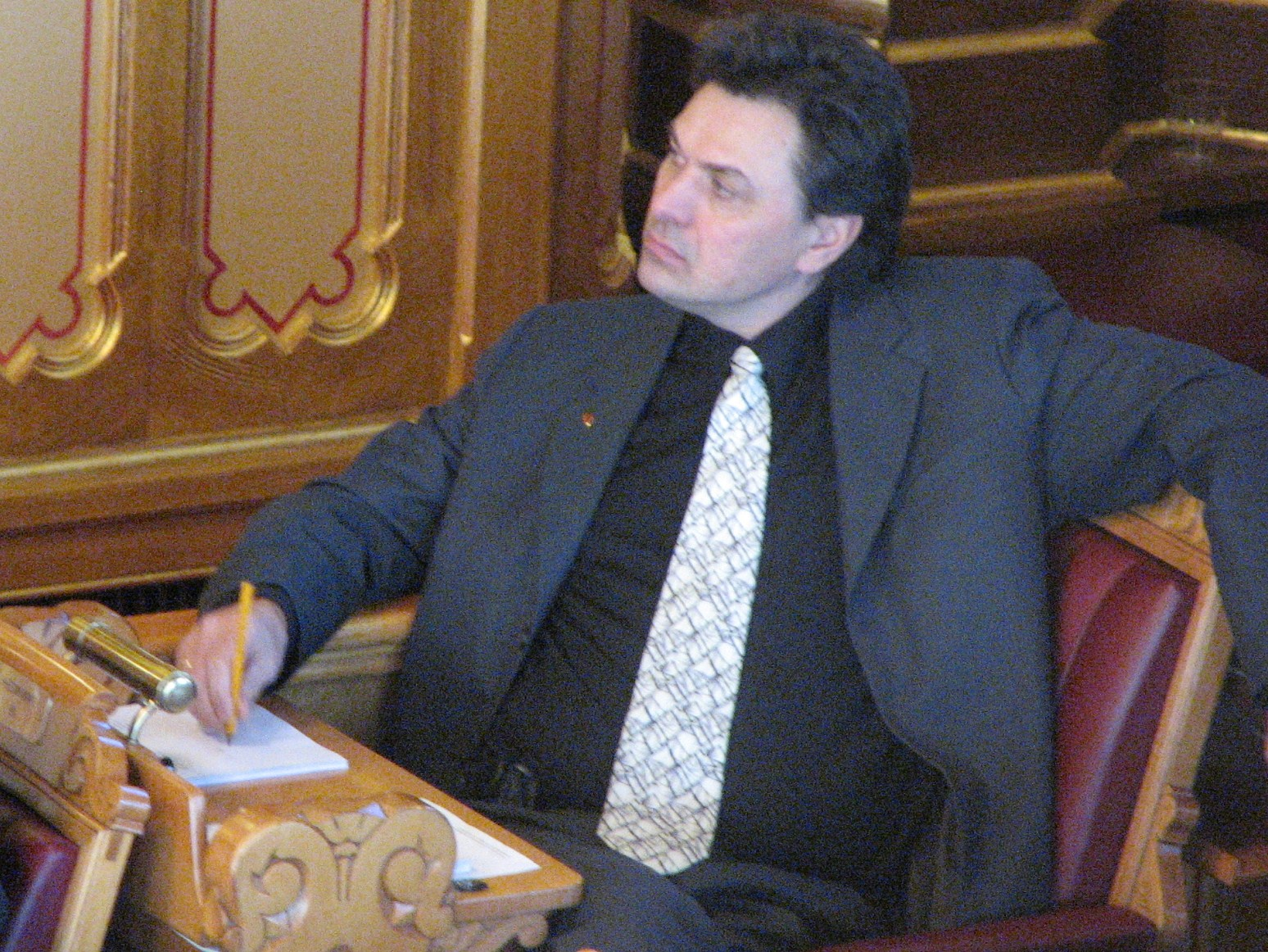

Minister of Petroleum and Energy
- In office 17 March 2000 – 19 October 2001
- Prime Minister: Jens Stoltenberg
- Preceded by: Marit Arnstad
- Succeeded by: Einar Steensnæs

Personal details
- Born: 28 August 1965 Stord Municipality, Hordaland, Norway
- Died: 17 August 2021 (aged 55)
- Party: Labour
- Education: UiB
- Occupation: Member of the Norwegian Parliament (1989–2009); Director of the Norwegian Maritime Authority (2009–)

Olav Akselsen (28 August 1965 – 17 August 2021) was a Norwegian politician, who served six terms in the Norwegian Parliament for the Norwegian Labour Party, and was Minister of Petroleum and Energy in the first cabinet Stoltenberg from 2000 to 2001. From 2010 to 2021, he worked for the Norwegian Maritime Directorate.

== Early life and education ==
Akselsen was born in Stord Municipality as the son of builder Arne Akselsen (born 1928) and his wife Aud Sortland (born 1932), who worked as an "assistant".

He graduated from upper secondary school in 1984, took his examen philosophicum course at the University of Bergen in 1986 and graduated with a bachelor's degree in geography in 1988. Except for a tenure as a carpenter between 1986 and 1987, Akselsen had very little work experience outside of political life. Because of this, commentators have referred to him as a "broiler", a term referring to a person socialized mainly within a political party.

== Local politics ==
Before entering national politics, Akselsen had some experience in local politics. He was elected to the executive committee of the municipal council in his native Stord Municipality in 1983, was re-elected in 1987 but left in 1989 when entering the national parliament.

From 1983 to 1985 he had chaired the local branch of the Workers' Youth League, the youth wing of the Labour Party. At the same time he was a member of the board of the Labour Party local chapter. He was a member of the board of the regional Hordaland party chapter from 1986 to 1988. After a hiatus from local politics he returned as leader of the local party chapter from 1998 to 2001.

He also served on several public committees in Stord; pertaining to such matters as wild game, the environment, industry and equality. He was the deputy chair of some of these committees.

== National politics ==
=== 1989 to 2001 ===
Akselsen was first elected to the Norwegian Parliament in 1989, as the 14th representative from Hordaland county. He was re-elected in 1993 and 1997.

Three years into his third term, Bondevik's centrist first cabinet fell due to a failed motion of confidence. Jens Stoltenberg took over as Prime Minister, and selected Akselsen to his cabinet as Minister of Petroleum and Energy. During this period, Akselsen's seat in parliament was taken by Sigurd Grytten and Rita Tveiten, the latter for two weeks in 2001.

The position of Minister of Petroleum and Energy was central in Stoltenberg's first cabinet, partly because Bondevik's cabinet had lost the motion of confidence because of unwillingness to build fossil fuel power plants. The parliamentary opposition, including the Labour Party, held this to be necessary, and Akselsen had marked himself as a strong supporter of natural gas power plants. He viewed the power plant at Mongstad as especially important.

During Akselsen's tenure as Minister of Petroleum and Energy, the controversial part-privatization of the petroleum company Statoil also occurred. In January 2004, he was revealed to be a member of the secret "Oil Group", an informal forum consisting of present and former Labour Party politicians as well as representatives from Norwegian business sector, especially oil companies. However, in 2001 Akselsen retracted a permission to drill for oil in the Norwegian Sea outside of Lofoten.

=== 2001 to 2009 ===
The first Stoltenberg cabinet did not survive the 2001 Norwegian parliamentary election, and a second cabinet was formed by Bondevik. Akselsen, however, had entered the same election, and was re-elected for his fourth term. He was re-elected again in 2005, but despite the return of Stoltenberg as Prime Minister, Akselsen was not selected to his cabinet—although stated to possess the "potential".

From 1989 to 1993 Akselsen was, within the parliament, mainly a member of the Standing Committee on Justice, chairing it from April 1993. From 1993 to 1997 he was the secretary of the Standing Committee on Justice; from December 1996 he was also a member of the Enlarged Foreign Affairs Committee. From 1997 to 2001 he was a member of the Standing Committee on Energy and the Environment, chairing it from February to March 2000, at which point he became Minister of Petroleum and Energy. He was also a member of the 37-member Election Committee. From 2001 to 2005 he chaired the Standing Committee on Business and Industry, and from 2005 to 2009 he chaired both the Standing Committee on Foreign Affairs and the Enlarged Foreign Affairs Committee.

One year before the 2009 Norwegian parliamentary election, Akselsen announced that he declined to stand for re-election. Norwegian election researcher Anders Todal Jenssen stated that his specific declination is "probably problematic for [Norwegian Prime Minister] Stoltenberg", at a time when 31 politicians of the current red–green coalition had announced their withdrawal from Parliament. In late August 2008 Akselsen was appointed director of the Norwegian Maritime Directorate, a position he took after his parliamentary term ran out in October 2009. He resigned from the Norwegian Maritime Directorate in May 2021.

== Illness and death ==
Akselsen was diagnosed with cancer in 2019. In early 2021, he was treated for a brain tumour. Akselsen died on 17 August 2021, at age 55. He was survived by his wife and three children.

Political offices
Preceded by Marit Arnstad	Norwegian Minister of Petroleum and Energy; 2000–2001	Succeeded by Einar Steensnæs
