= Reidar Sandal =

Norwegian politician

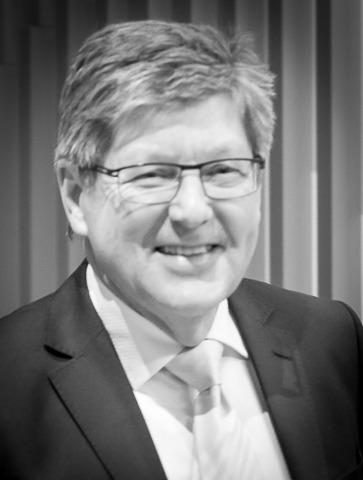
- Sandal in 2016

Minister of Education, Research and Church Affairs
- In office 22 December 1995 – 17 October 1997
- Prime Minister: Gro Harlem Brundtland; Thorbjørn Jagland
- Preceded by: Gudmund Hernes
- Succeeded by: Jon Lilletun

Personal details
- Born: 24 March 1949 (age 77) Vågsøy, Norway
- Party: Labour Party

Reidar Sandal (born 24 March 1949 in Vågsøy) is a Norwegian politician for the Labour Party, and was a parliamentary representative for Sogn og Fjordane. He was Minister of Education, Research and Church Affairs 1995-1996 and 1996-1997.
