= Olav Steinnes =

Norwegian educator and politician

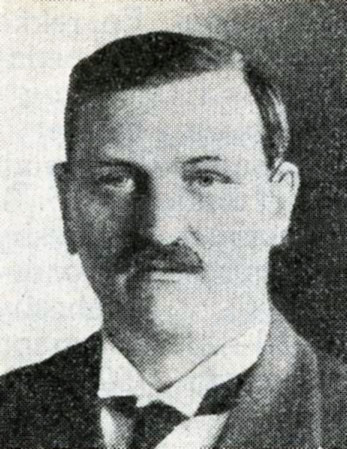

Minister of Education and Church Affairs
- In office 28 January 1928 – 15 February 1928
- Prime Minister: Christopher Hornsrud
- Preceded by: Ole Bærøe
- Succeeded by: Sigvald Hasund

Member of the Norwegian Parliament
- In office 1 January 1922 – 31 December 1936
- Constituency: Telemark

Personal details
- Born: Olav Martinius Knutsen Steinnes; 9 January 1886 Ørsta Municipality, Møre og Romsdal, Sweden-Norway
- Died: 26 June 1961 (aged 75)
- Party: Labour; Nasjonal Samling

Olav Martinius Knutsen Steinnes (9 January 1886 – 26 June 1961) was a Norwegian educator and politician for the Labour Party and Nasjonal Samling.

He was born at Steinnes in Ørsta Municipality as a son of farmers Knut Olai Olavsen Steinnes (1856–1935) and Berte Sporstøyl (1860–1924). After some years as a laborer he attended Møre Folk High School and then Volda Teachers' College from 1907 to 1910. He worked as a teacher in Vikna Municipality from 1910 to 1912, then in Rjukan. In 1920 he was promoted to school headmaster, still in Rjukan. He remained here until 1935, when he was appointed as school director in the Dioceses of Agder and Stavanger.

He was a member of the executive committee of the municipal council of Tinn Municipality from 1916 to 1925. He was elected to the Parliament of Norway in 1921, representing the constituency of Telemark. He was re-elected in 1924, 1927, 1930 and 1933, with his last term ending in 1936. In January 1928 he was appointed as Minister of Education and Church Affairs in Hornsrud's Cabinet. Hornsrud's Cabinet only lasted until February. While Steinnes was a Minister, his parliamentary seat was filled by Eileif Kolsrud.

During the German occupation of Norway he joined the Fascist party Nasjonal Samling. He claimed to have joined the party to stay in the school director job and counteract Nazification of the school system. He probably did so only when his own position was not at stake. Other than his job, he was preoccupied with nuclear physics as a hobby. After the war, he claimed to have made several great inventions in the preceding years. In a letter to Kaare Fostervoll in the autumn of 1945, he said that his "series of inventions" would "bring honor and benefit to me and my country. They are—after my calculations—the most important discoveries ever made in history by a single man".

On 1 February 1947, during the legal purge in Norway after World War II he was convicted of treason and sentenced to six months in prison and loss of his job.

Political offices
| Preceded by Ole Ludvig Bærøe | Norwegian Minister of Church and Education; January – February 1928 | Succeeded by Sigvald Hasund |
