= Mary Synnøve Kvidal =

Norwegian politician

Mary Kvidal

State Secretary for the Ministry of Finance and Customs
- In office 1 November 1996 – 17 October 1997
- Prime Minister: Thorbjørn Jagland
- Minister: Jens Stoltenberg

State Secretary for the Ministry of Industry and Energy
- In office 1 January 1996 – 25 October 1996
- Prime Minister: Gro Harlem Brundtland
- Minister: Jens Stoltenberg

Minister of Education and Church Affairs
- In office 13 June 1988 – 16 October 1989
- Prime Minister: Gro Harlem Brundtland
- Preceded by: Kirsti Kolle Grøndahl
- Succeeded by: Einar Steensnæs

Member of the Norwegian Parliament
- In office 1 October 1989 – 30 September 1993
- Constituency: Sør-Trøndelag

Deputy Member of the Norwegian Parliament
- In office 1 October 1985 – 30 September 1989
- Constituency: Sør-Trøndelag

Personal details
- Born: Mary Synnøve Kvidal; 4 July 1943 (age 82) Malvik Municipality, Sør-Trøndelag, Norway
- Party: Labour
- Spouse: Otto Kvidal (m. 1963)
- Children: 1

Mary Synnøve Kvidal (born 4 July 1943) is a Norwegian school principal and politician for the Labour Party.

She was born in Malvik Municipality. After finishing her secondary education in 1963, she graduated from a teachers' college in 1965 and started working as a teacher in her native Malvik. After one year in Vikhammer, she was hired at Hommelvik School in 1966, advancing to inspector in 1976 and principal from 1981 to 1988.

Kvidal was elected to the municipal council of Malvik Municipality from 1967 to 1971 and 1975 to 1979. She also held numerous other municipal and regional posts. She chaired Sør-Trøndelag Labour Party from 1987 to 1993, having previously been a board member since 1982 and deputy leader since 1984.

She was elected as a deputy representative to the Parliament of Norway from Sør-Trøndelag in 1985, and as a full representative in 1989. She served in Brundtland's Second Cabinet as Minister of Education and Church Affairs from 1988 to 1989. Kvidal later served in Brundtland's Third Cabinet and Jagland's Cabinet as State Secretary to the Minister of Industry and Energy in 1996 and to the Minister of Finance 1996–1997.

Kvidal ended her career as director of education in Malvik Municipality from 1994 to 2005. In 2006, she was given the King's Medal of Merit in gold.

Outside of politics, Kvidal chaired the Norwegian State Housing Bank from 1986 to 1988 and the supervisory council of the Bank of Norway, was the deputy chair of the Norwegian Broadcasting Corporation in 1988, board member of Credit Supervisory Authority from 1994 to 1996 and member of the Norwegian Parliamentary Intelligence Oversight Committee from 2003 to 2006.

Political offices
Preceded by Kirsti Kolle Grøndahl	Norwegian Minister of Church and Education Affairs; 1988–1989	Succeeded by Einar Steensnæs
