= Sigurd Grytten =

Norwegian politician (born 1972)

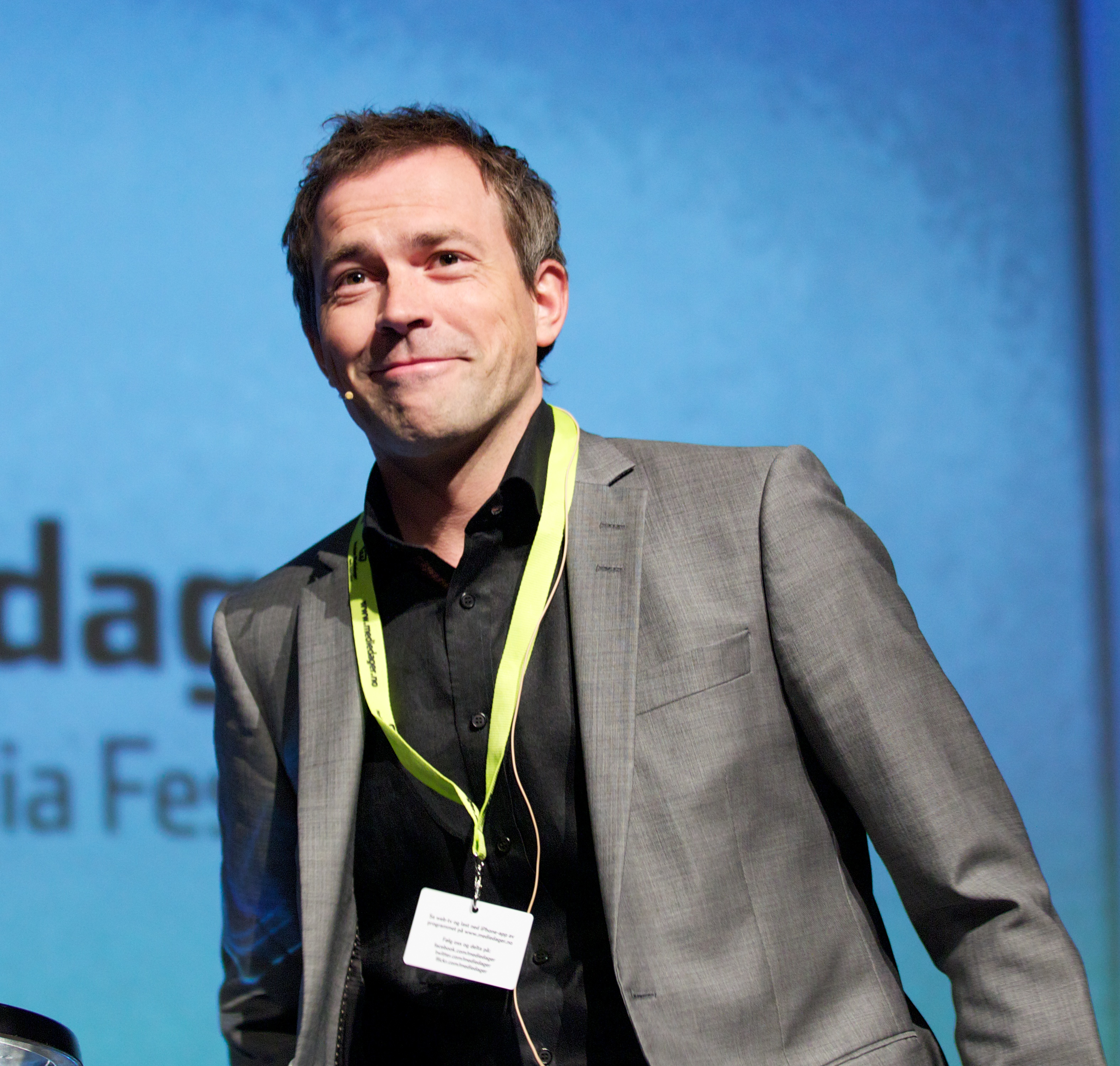
Sigurd Grytten, 2010

Sigurd Grytten (born 9 September 1972) is a Norwegian lobbyist and member of the Labour Party.

Grytten works with the lobbyist firm Zync. He previously served as a deputy representative to the Norwegian Parliament from Hordaland during the term 1997–2001. From 2000 to 2001 he was a regular representative, covering for Olav Akselsen who was appointed to the first cabinet Stoltenberg. From 2001 to 2002 he was the leader of the Norwegian branch of the European Movement.
