= Kirsti Kolle Grøndahl =

Norwegian politician (born 1943)

Kristi Kolle Grøndahl

County Governor of Buskerud
- In office 1 June 1999 – 30 September 2013
- Monarch: Harald V
- Prime Minister: Kjell Magne Bondevik; Jens Stoltenberg
- Preceded by: Jon Arvid Lea (acting)
- Succeeded by: Helen Bjørnøy

President of the Storting
- In office 11 October 1993 – 30 September 2001
- Prime Minister: Gro Harlem Brundtland; Thorbjørn Jagland; Kjell Magne Bondevik; Jens Stoltenberg
- Vice President: Edvard Grimstad; Hans J. Røsjorde
- Preceded by: Jo Benkow
- Succeeded by: Jørgen Kosmo

Vice President of the Storting
- In office 23 October 1989 – 30 September 1993
- President: Jo Benkow
- Preceded by: Reiulf Steen
- Succeeded by: Edvard Grimstad

Minister of International Development
- In office 13 June 1988 – 16 October 1989
- Prime Minister: Gro Harlem Brundtland
- Preceded by: Vesla Vetlesen
- Succeeded by: Tom Vraalsen

Minister of Education and Church Affairs
- In office 9 May 1986 – 13 June 1988
- Prime Minister: Gro Harlem Brundtland
- Preceded by: Kjell Magne Bondevik
- Succeeded by: Mary Kvidal

Personal details
- Born: Brit Kirsti Kolle Grøndahl; 1 September 1943 (age 82) Oslo, Norway
- Party: Labour
- Spouse: Svein-Erik Grøndahl (m. 1967)

Brit Kirsti Kolle Grøndahl (born 1 September 1943) is a Norwegian politician for the Labour Party, former County Governor of Buskerud. She was Minister of Education and Church Affairs from 1986 to 1988 and Minister of International Development from 1988 to 1989.

From 11 October 1993 to 30 September 2001, she was the first female President of the Storting, and she has been County Governor of Buskerud since 1999.

Political offices
Preceded by Kjell Magne Bondevik	Norwegian Minister of Church and Education Affairs; 1986–1988	Succeeded by Mary Kvidal
Preceded by Reiulf Steen	Vice President of the Storting; 1989–1993	Succeeded by Edvard Grimstad
Preceded by Jo Benkow	President of the Storting; 1993–2001	Succeeded by Jørgen Kosmo
Civic offices
Preceded by Jon Arvid Lea (acting)	County Governor of Buskerud; 2001-2013	Succeeded by Helen Bjørnøy
