= Einar Steensnæs =

Norwegian politician

Minister of Petroleum and Energy
- In office 19 October 2001 – 18 June 2004
- Prime Minister: Kjell Magne Bondevik
- Preceded by: Olav Akselsen
- Succeeded by: Thorhild Widvey

Minister of Education and Church Affairs
- In office 16 October 1989 – 3 November 1990
- Prime Minister: Jan P. Syse
- Preceded by: Mary Kvidal
- Succeeded by: Gudmund Hernes

Member of the Norwegian Parliament
- In office 21 October 1993 – 30 September 1997
- Constituency: Rogaland

Personal details
- Born: 10 March 1942 (age 84) Haugesund, Rogaland, Norway
- Party: Christian Democratic

Einar Steensnæs (born 10 March 1942) is a Norwegian politician for the Christian Democrats, and served as parliamentary representative for Rogaland 1993–1997. He was also Minister of Education and Church Affairs 1989–1990, and Minister of Petroleum and Energy 2001–2004.

Political offices
Preceded by Mary Kvidal	Norwegian Minister of Education and Research; 1989–1990	Succeeded by Gudmund Hernes
Preceded by Olav Akselsen	Norwegian Minister of Petroleum and Energy; 2001–2004	Succeeded by Thorhild Widvey
