= Ole Ludvig Bærøe =

Norwegian politician (1877–1943)

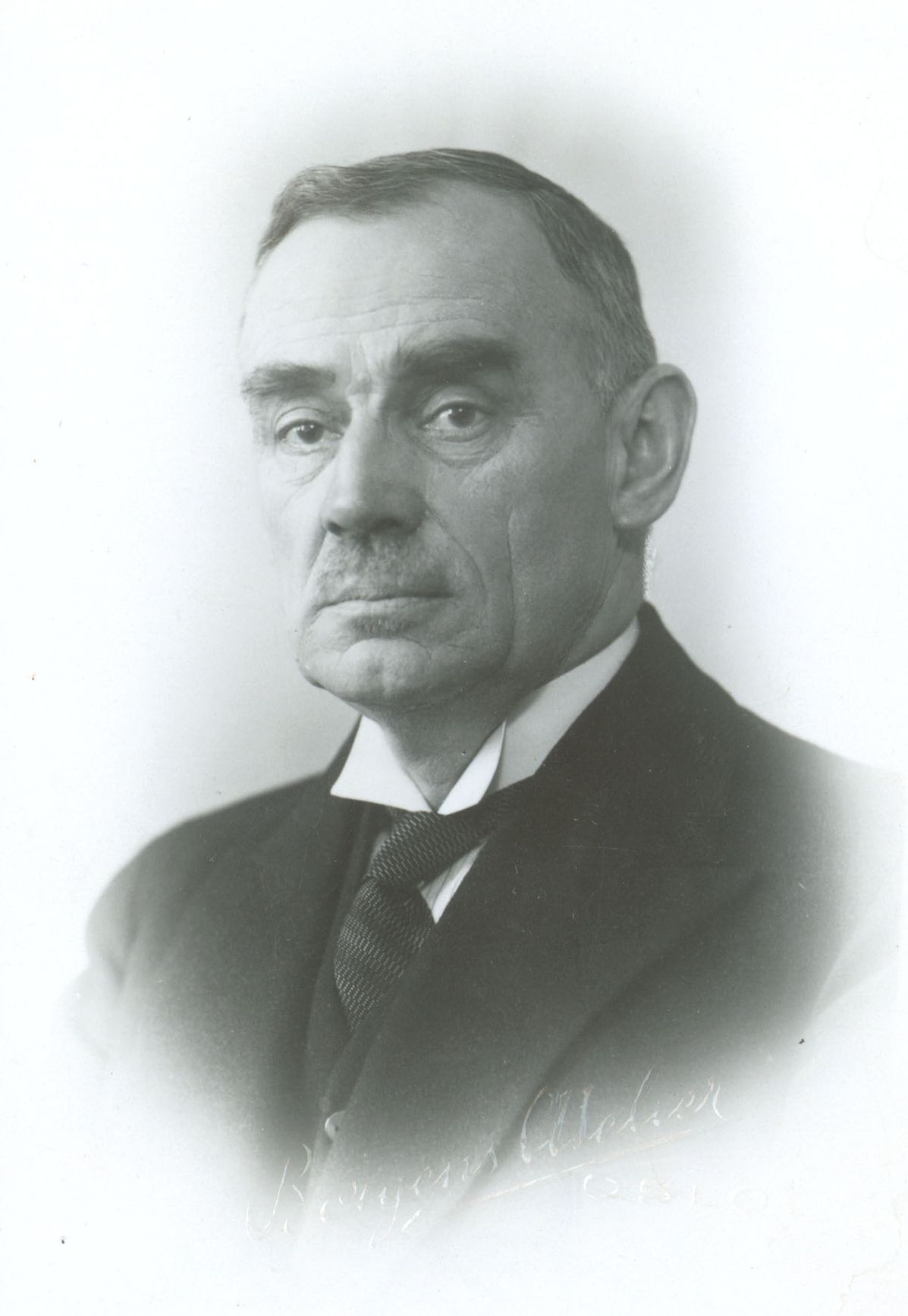

Leader of the Conservative Party
- In office 16 March 1937 – 22 March 1943
- Preceded by: Johan H. Andresen
- Succeeded by: Arthur Nordlie

Minister of Agriculture
- In office 5 March 1926 – 28 January 1928
- Prime Minister: Ivar Lykke
- Preceded by: Håkon Five
- Succeeded by: Johan Nygaardsvold

Minister of Education and Church Affairs
- In office 25 December 1927 – 28 January 1928
- Prime Minister: Ivar Lykke
- Preceded by: Wilhelm Magelssen
- Succeeded by: Olav Steinnes

Personal details
- Born: Ols Ludvig Bærøe; 29 January 1877 Undrumsdal, Vestfold, United Kingdoms of Sweden and Norway
- Died: 22 March 1943 (aged 66) Ås, Akershus, Norway
- Party: Conservative
- Spouse: Gudrun Hirch
- Children: 4

Ole Ludvig Bærøe (29 January 1877 - 22 March 1943) was a Norwegian politician for the Conservative Party. Bærøe was Minister of Agriculture 1926–1928, as well as head of the Ministry of Education and Church Affairs 1927–1928. He was a headmaster by profession before entering the Lykke Government in 1926. Bærøe was leader of the Conservative Party from 1937 to 1940, though legally he was leader until his death in 1943 despite political parties being forbidden in Norway during the German occupation.
