= Hans Aarstad =

Norwegian politician (1878–1954)

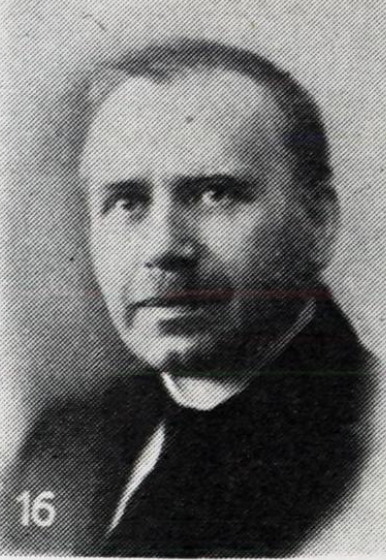

Minister of Agriculture
- In office 1928–1931

President of the Odelsting
- In office 1925–1928

member of the Parliament of Norway
- In office 1919–1933

Personal details
- Born: 9 July 1878 Sokndal Municipality
- Died: 19 January 1954 (aged 75)
- Party: Liberal Party

Hans Jørgensen Aarstad (9 July 1878 – 19 January 1954) was a Norwegian politician for the Liberal Party. He served as Minister of Agriculture from February 1928 to May 1931 in Mowinckel's Second Cabinet.

Born in Sokndal Municipality, Rogaland county to a farmer family, he studied at Tveit school of agriculture in Nedstrand and later at the Agricultural University of Norway in Ås Municipality in Akershus county. He then worked as a teacher at Tveit school of agriculture.

He was elected as a deputy member of the Parliament of Norway in 1916 and was elected as an ordinary member of the Parliament in 1919; a seat he held in 1933. In the period 1925–1928, he served as President of the Odelsting. From February 1928 to May 1931, he served as Minister of Agriculture in Mowinckel's Second Cabinet.

After retiring from the Parliament, he served as rector of Tveit school of agriculture from 1933 to 1943. He died in 1954.
