= Edvard Grimstad =

Norwegian politician (1933–2014)

County Governor of Vestfold
- In office 1998–2003
- Preceded by: Erling Norvik
- Succeeded by: Anne Enger

Vice President of the Storting
- In office 11 October 1993 – 30 September 1997
- President: Kirsti Kolle Grøndahl
- Preceded by: Kirsti Kolle Grøndahl
- Succeeded by: Hans J. Røsjorde

Personal details
- Born: 29 March 1933 Råde, Norway
- Died: 3 April 2014 (aged 81) Oslo, Norway
- Party: Centre
- Occupation: Politician, farmer

Edvard Grimstad (29 March 1933 – 3 April 2014) was a Norwegian farmer and politician for the Centre Party.

== Biography ==
He was born on 29 March 1933, in Råde, to farmers Johan E. Grimstad (1902–1966) and Marie Gammelsrød (1906–1985). He finished basic education in Råde in 1948, then took a year each in Rygge and Mysen before attending Kalnes Agricultural School from 1952 to 1954 and the Norwegian College of Agriculture from 1958 to 1962. He was briefly a research assistant here in 1962.

From 1962 to 1966, he was a consultant in Fellesslakteriet, before taking over the family farm in 1966. He spent two years as an aid consultant in Kenya for two years before finally settling on the family farm in 1968. He was the managing director of Gartnerhallen from 1977 to 1981, then a Nordic aid coordinator in Mozambique from 1983 to 1987.

He was a member of Råde municipal council from 1971 to 1983, serving as mayor in 1975–1976 and deputy mayor in 1979–1983. He was a deputy member of Østfold county council from 1971 to 1983 and member from 1983 to 1987. He was a member of the land board in Råde from 1971 to 1975 and the county agricultural board from 1975 to 1979 (later chair 1979–1983 and 1987–1991). From 1976 to 1980, he chaired Østfold Centre Party.

He was elected to the Parliament of Norway from Østfold in 1989, and was re-elected in 1993 to serve eight years. From 1993 to 1997, he served as Vice President of the Storting. After leaving elected politics he served as the County Governor of Østfold from 1998 to 2003.

Grimstad began his organizational career in 4-H in the 1950s. From 1962 to 1966, he chaired Norges Bygdeungdomslag and was a board member of the Norwegian Agrarian Association; from 1964 to 1966 he also chaired the Norwegian Children and Youth Council. Grimstad was later secretary in the Norwegian Agrarian Association from 1968 to 1975, board member of Gartnerhallen from 1975 to 1977, Landbrukets sentralforbund and Landbrukssamvirkets felleskontor from 1975 to 1981, Norwegian Church Aid from 1976 to 1983 and Grimstad Konservesfabrik from 1977 to 1981. He died on 3 April 2014, aged 81, in Oslo.
