= Thorhild Widvey =

Norwegian politician (born 1956)

Thorhild Widvey MP
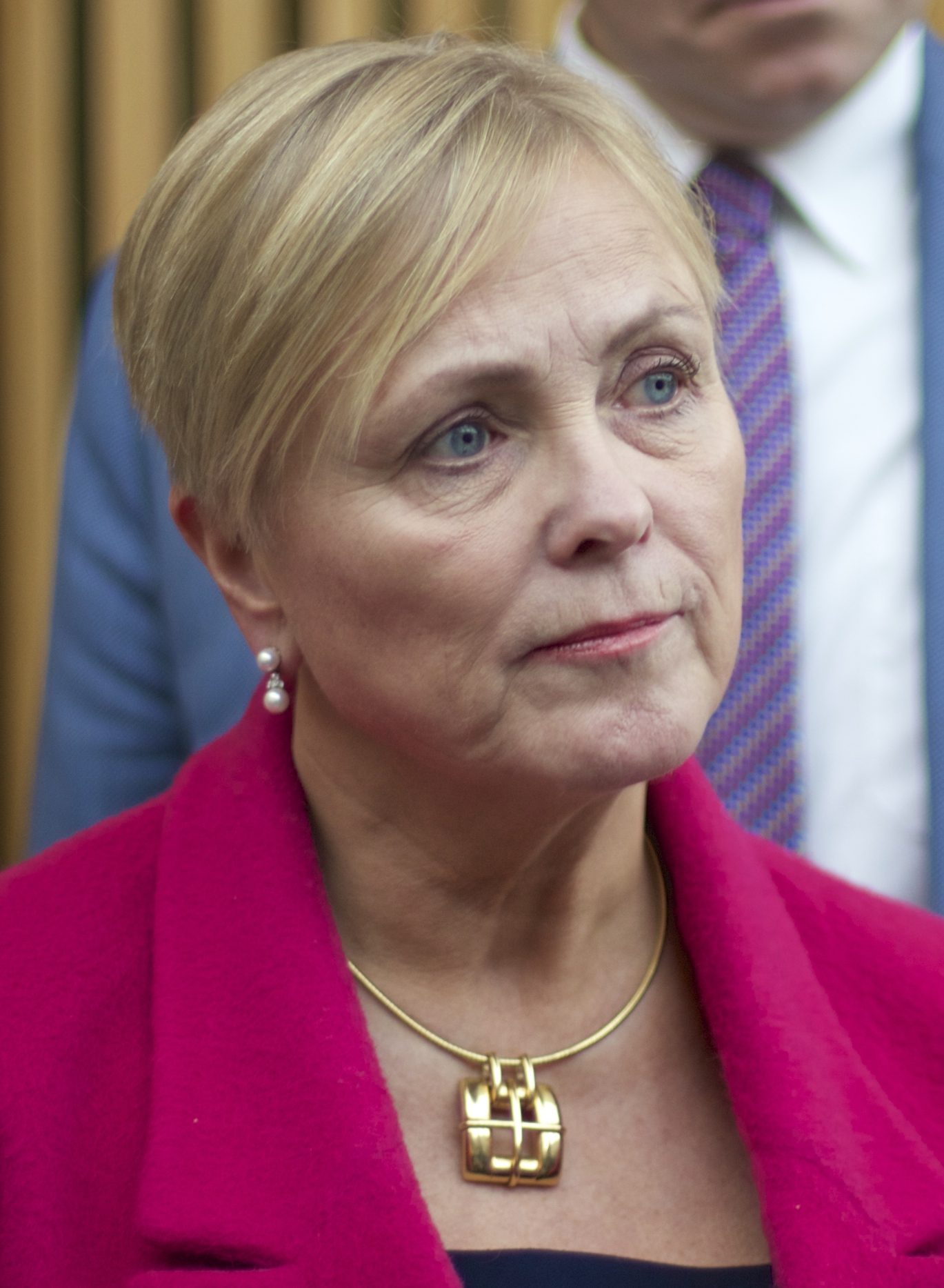
- Widvey in 2014

Minister of Culture
- In office 16 October 2013 – 16 December 2015
- Prime Minister: Erna Solberg
- Preceded by: Hadia Tajik
- Succeeded by: Linda Hofstad Helleland

Minister of Petroleum and Energy
- In office 18 June 2004 – 17 October 2005
- Prime Minister: Kjell Magne Bondevik
- Preceded by: Einar Steensnæs
- Succeeded by: Odd Roger Enoksen

Member of the Norwegian Parliament
- In office 1 October 1989 – 30 September 1997
- Constituency: Rogaland

Personal details
- Born: 9 January 1956 (age 70) Karmøy, Norway
- Party: Conservative
- Spouse: Osvald Bjelland
- Children: 2
- Education: BI Norwegian Business School

Thorhild Widvey (born 9 January 1956) is a Norwegian politician for the Conservative Party who served as Minister of Culture from 2013 to 2015, and Minister of Petroleum and Energy from 2004 to 2005.

== Political career ==
=== Local politics ===
On the local level Widvey was a member of the municipal council of Karmøy Municipality from 1979 to 1989, the last six years in the executive committee.

=== Parliament ===
She was elected to the Norwegian Parliament from Rogaland in 1989, and was re-elected on one occasion. She had previously served as a deputy representative during the term 1985–1989.

=== Bondevik cabinet ===
From 2002 to 2003, during the second cabinet Bondevik, Widvey was appointed State Secretary of the Ministry of Fisheries. From 2003 to 2004, she held the same position in the Ministry of Foreign Affairs. In 2004, she was appointed Norwegian Minister of Petroleum and Energy, an office she left, along with the rest of the second cabinet Bondevik, after their 2005 election defeat.

== Early and personal life ==
She was born on 9 January 1956, in Avaldsnes. A physical therapist by education, she was deputy leader of the Norwegian Sporting Association of People with Disabilities 1985–1987. Widvey lives in Oslo, is married and has two children.

Her husband is businessman Osvald Bjelland.

Political offices
Preceded by Einar Steensnæs	Norwegian Minister of Petroleum and Energy; 2004–2005	Succeeded by Odd Roger Enoksen
Preceded by Hadia Tajik	Minister of Culture; 2013–2015	Succeeded by Linda Hofstad Helleland
