= Mowinckel's Second Cabinet =

Norwegian government

- Cabinet of Norway

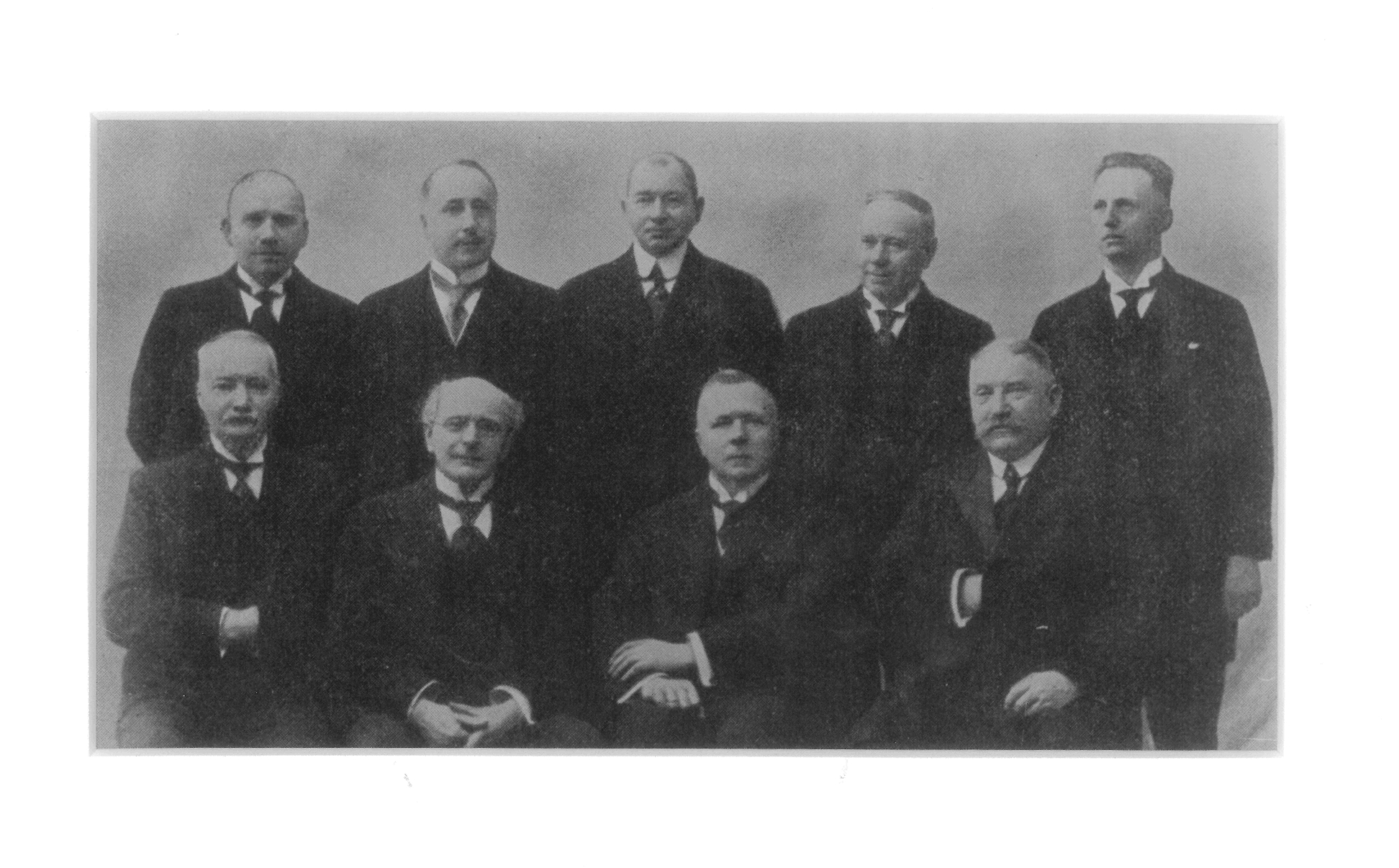
- Front: Hasund, Oftedal, Prime Minister Mowinckel and Monsen Mjelde. Rear: Evjenth, Berg Lund, Jørgensen Aarstad, Værland and Anderssen-Rysst.
- Date formed: 15 February 1928
- Date dissolved: 12 May 1931

People and organisations
- Head of state: Haakon VII of Norway
- Head of government: Johan Ludwig Mowinckel
- Total no. of members: 9
- Member party: Liberal Party
- Status in legislature: Minority

History
- Incoming formation: Change of government following motion of no-confidence
- Outgoing formation: The Lilleborg Case
- Election: 1930 parliamentary election
- Legislature term: 1928–1930
- Predecessor: Hornsrud's Cabinet
- Successor: Kolstad's Cabinet

Mowinckel's Second Cabinet governed Norway between 15 February 1928 and 12 May 1931. It had the following composition:

== Cabinet members ==
Cabinet
Portfolio	Minister	Took office	Left office	Party
Prime Minister; Minister of Foreign Affairs	Johan Ludwig Mowinckel	15 February 1928	12 May 1931	Liberal
Minister of Justice and the Police	Haakon M. Evjenth	15 February 1928	21 November 1930	Liberal
Minister of Justice and the Police	Arne T. Sunde	21 November 1930	12 May 1931	Liberal
Minister of Finance and Customs	Per Berg Lund	15 February 1928	12 May 1931	Liberal
Minister of Defence	Torgeir Anderssen-Rysst	15 February 1928	12 May 1931	Liberal
Minister of Agriculture	Hans Jørgensen Aarstad	15 February 1928	12 May 1931	Liberal
Minister of Education and Church Affairs	Sigvald M. Hasund	15 February 1928	12 May 1931	Liberal
Minister of Trade	Lars Oftedal	15 February 1928	12 May 1931	Liberal
Minister of Labour	Ole Monsen Mjelde	15 February 1928	12 May 1931	Liberal
Minister of Social Affairs	Torjus Værland	15 February 1928	12 May 1931	Liberal

== Secretary to the Council of State ==
State Secretary	Period
Nicolai Franciscus Leganger	– 30 September 1929
Bredo Rolsted	1 October 1930 –
