= Gudmund Hernes =

Norwegian professor and politician

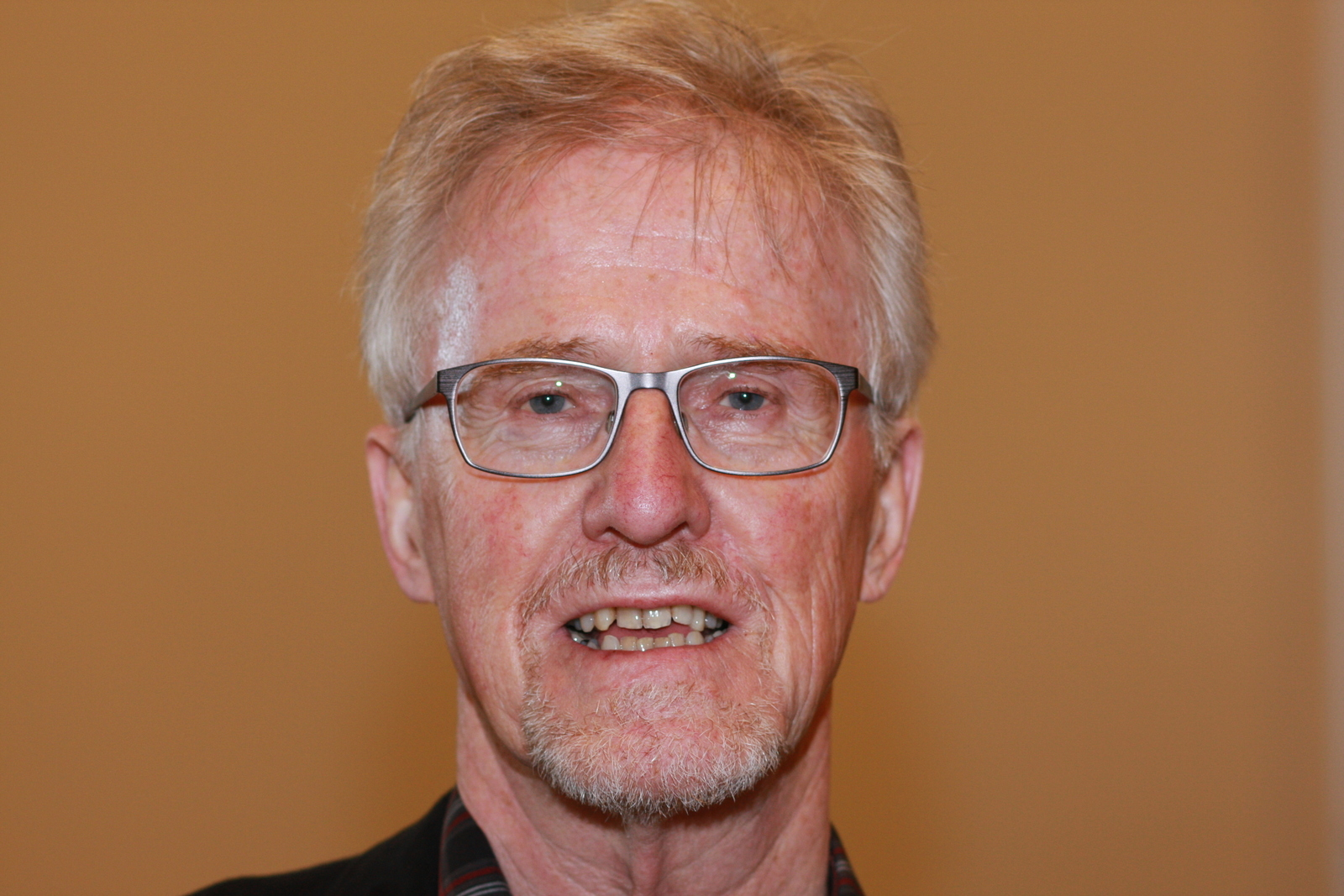

Minister of Health and Social Affairs
- In office 22 December 1995 – 17 October 1997
- Prime Minister: Gro Harlem Brundtland; Thorbjørn Jagland
- Preceded by: Werner Christie
- Succeeded by: Dagfinn Høybråten

Minister of Education and Research
- In office 3 November 1990 – 22 December 1995
- Prime Minister: Gro Harlem Brundtland
- Preceded by: Einar Steensnæs
- Succeeded by: Reidar Sandal

Personal details
- Born: 25 March 1941 (age 85) Trondheim, Sør-Trøndelag, Reichskommissariat Norwegen (today Norway)
- Party: Labour
- Spouse(s): Helga Hernes (unknown period); Charlotte Haug (2008-)
- Children: Stein Hernes

Gudmund Hernes (born 25 March 1941 in Trondheim) is a Norwegian professor and politician for the Labour Party. He was the state secretary to the Secretariat for Long-Term Planning 1980–1981, Minister of Education and Research and Ministry of Church and Cultural Affairs (church affairs) 1990, Minister of Education, Research and Church Affairs 1991-1995 and Minister of Health and Social Affairs (health affairs) 1995-1996 and 1996–1997.

Gudmund Hernes got his PhD in sociology at Johns Hopkins University in 1971. He became a professor at the University of Bergen in 1971, and later at the University of Oslo. He has been a Fellow at The Center for Advanced Study in the Behavioral Sciences, Stanford (1974–75) and Visiting Professor at Harvard University in 1986 and 1990.

From 1999 to 2005 he was the Director of UNESCO's International Institute of Educational Planning in Paris, and UNESCO's Coordinator on HIV/AIDS.

He is a member of the Norwegian Academy of Science and Letters. the Royal Norwegian Society of Sciences and Letters, Royal Norwegian Society of Sciences and Letters, Agder Academy of Sciences and Letters, and The Norwegian Scientific Academy for Polar Research . Gudmund Hernes is researcher at the Fafo Institute in Oslo, and adjunct professor at BI Norwegian Business School. During 2006-2011 he was president of The International Social Science Council From 2017 he has been the Chair of the University Board (Konsistorium) at Uppsala University. Hernes is an honorary doctor at Umeå University and the University of Bergen. Among his other awards are an Honorary Member of the Norwegian Fulbright Association, The Honorary Price of the Norwegian Sociological Association and Honorary Fellow of the European Academy of Sociology. He has been a columnist in several Norwegian papers, and for the last thirteen years in the Norwegian Weekly Morgenbladet.

Political offices
Preceded by Einar Steensnæs	Norwegian Minister of Education and Research; 1990–1995	Succeeded by Reidar Sandal
Preceded by Werner Christie	Norwegian Minister of Health; 1995–1997	Succeeded by Dagfinn Høybråten
