= Sigvald Hasund =

Norwegian researcher of agriculture and politician

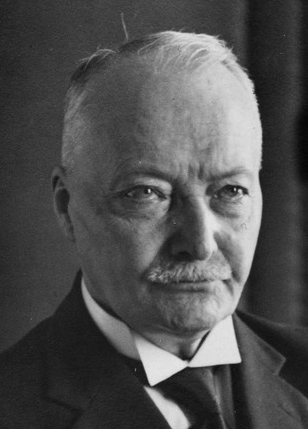
- Hasund in around 1935.

Minister of Education and Church Affairs
- In office 15 February 1928 – 12 May 1931
- Prime Minister: J. L. Mowinckel
- Preceded by: Olav Steinnes
- Succeeded by: Nils Trædal

Personal details
- Born: Sigvald Mathias Hasund; 24 March 1868 Ulstein, Møre og Romsdal, Sweden-Norway
- Died: 5 September 1959 (aged 91) Oslo, Norway
- Party: Liberal
- Spouse(s): Signe Johanne Hansen (m. 1931); Johanne Margrethe Hagerup Raanes (1894–?)

Sigvald Mathias Hasund (24 March 1868 – 5 September 1959) was a Norwegian researcher of agriculture and politician for the Liberal Party. He was Minister of Church and Education from 1928 to 1931.

He was born in Hasund in Ulstein Municipality as the son of a farmer. He graduated from at the Higher College of Agriculture (from 1897 known as the Norwegian College of Agriculture) in 1890, and from 1890 to 1897 he was a school teacher and headmaster in his native Romsdals Amt. In 1898 he was appointed county agronomist in Bratsbergs Amt. He left in 1906 to edit the magazine Frøi. He also covered agricultural topics for the newspaper Den 17de Mai for some time.

He was hired as a teacher at the Norwegian College of Agriculture in 1907. In 1914 he was promoted to professor, specializing in the history of agriculture. He was the first publish a concise history of agriculture in Norway. From 1923 to 1928 he served as rector at the Norwegian College of Agriculture.

Hasund had been involved in politics as a member of the executive committee of the municipal council of Aas Municipality from 1917 to 1918. When the second cabinet Mowinckel assumed office in 1928, Hasund was appointed Minister of Church and Education. He was known for refusing to ordain liberal theologian Kristian Schjelderup, who would become bishop in 1947, as vicar in the parish Værøy og Røst.

When the second cabinet Mowinckel fell in 1931, Hasund lost his job. He returned as professor at the Norwegian College of Agriculture, where he stayed until his retirement in 1938. His most important publications were Det norske landbruks historie (1919), Bønder og stat under naturalsystemet (1924) and Landbruksundervisningen i Norge gjennom 100 år (1926, with I. Nesheim). He was a member of the Norwegian Academy of Science and Letters and the Royal Norwegian Society for Development.

Academic offices
Preceded by	Rector of the Norwegian College of Agriculture; 1923–1928	Succeeded by Agnar Johannes Barth
Political offices
Preceded by Olav Steinnes	Norwegian Minister of Church and Education; 1928–1931	Succeeded by Nils Trædal
