= Hornsrud's Cabinet =

Government of Norway from January to February 1928

- Cabinet of Norway

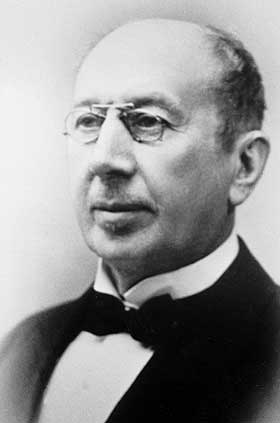
- Prime Minister Hornsurd.
- Date formed: 28 January 1928
- Date dissolved: 15 February 1928

People and organisations
- Head of state: Haakon VII of Norway
- Head of government: Christopher Hornsrud
- Total no. of members: 9
- Member party: Labour Party
- Status in legislature: Minority

History
- Incoming formation: 1927 parliamentary election
- Outgoing formation: Vote of no confidence
- Election: 1927 parliamentary election
- Legislature term: 1928–1930
- Predecessor: Lykke's Cabinet
- Successor: Mowinckel's Second Cabinet

Hornsrud's Cabinet governed Norway between 28 January 1928 and 15 February 1928. The first Labour Party cabinet in Norway, it was defeated by the other parliamentary parties on a vote of no confidence after only sixteen days.

In its day it was often known as Arbeiderregjeringen, "the workers' cabinet".

== Cabinet members ==
Portfolio	Minister	Took office	Left office	Party
Prime Minister; Minister of Finance and Customs	Christopher Hornsrud	28 January 1928	15 February 1928	Labour
Minister of Foreign Affairs	Edvard Bull sr.	28 January 1928	15 February 1928	Labour
Minister of Justice and the Police	Cornelius Holmboe	28 January 1928	15 February 1928	Labour
Minister of Defence	Fredrik Monsen	28 January 1928	15 February 1928	Labour
Minister of Agriculture	Johan Nygaardsvold	28 January 1928	15 February 1928	Labour
Minister of Education and Church Affairs	Olav Steinnes	28 January 1928	15 February 1928	Labour
Minister of Trade	Anton L. Alvestad	28 January 1928	15 February 1928	Labour
Minister of Labour	Magnus Nilssen	28 January 1928	15 February 1928	Labour
Minister of Social Affairs	Alfred Madsen	28 January 1928	15 February 1928	Labour

== Secretary to the Council of State ==
This position is now known as Secretary to the Government (Regjeringsråd).

- Nicolai Franciscus Leganger
