= Sissel Knutsen Hegdal =

Norwegian politician (born 1965)

Mayor of Stavanger
- In office 23 October 2023 – 14 October 2024
- Deputy: Henrik Halleland
- Preceded by: Kari Nessa Nordtun
- Succeeded by: Tormod W. Losnedal

Deputy Member of the Storting
- In office 1 October 2009 – 30 September 2017
- Constituency: Rogaland

Personal details
- Born: 20 November 1965 (age 60) Harstad, Troms, Norway
- Party: Labour; Conservative (formerly)
- Children: 3

Sissel Knutsen Hegdal (born 20 November 1965) is a Norwegian politician and lawyer formerly for the Conservative Party. She served as the mayor of Stavanger between 2023 and 2024, and was previously a deputy member of parliament for Rogaland between 2009 and 2017.

== Political career ==
=== Parliament ===
She served as a deputy representative to the Storting from Rogaland from 2009 to 2017.

=== Local politics ===
She has been a member of Stavanger city council since 2007. Though originally elected as a Conservative, she spent two years as an independent following her resignation as mayor of Stavanger before joining the Labour Party in November 2026.

In 2021, she became the Stavanger Conservatives' mayoral candidate for the 2023 local elections.

=== Mayor of Stavanger ===
==== Election ====
Despite the opposing Labour Party becoming the largest party in Stavanger following the election, the Conservative led bloc inched out a majority together with the Progress Party, Liberal Party, Christian Democrats and the Pensioners' Party, with Hegdal as mayor and the Christian Democrats' Henrik Halleland as deputy mayor. The parties signed a cooperation agreement on 18 October. Hegdal and Helland were confirmed by the municipal council on 23 October and assumed office the same day.

==== Party funds controversy ====
She resigned as mayor with immediate effect on 4 September 2024 after it was revealed that she had misused party funds for private purposes during the 2023 election campaign. She also went on sick leave following her resignation, with deputy mayor Henrik Halleland taking over as acting mayor in the interim. The Conservative Party on a national level encouraged the local chapter in Stavanger to report Hegdal to the police, something they refused to do. The national party also sent over documents to the police related to Hegdal's case. The police also didn't rule out opening a criminal case against her, which they eventually did the day after her resignation.

Due to the local government act stipulating that a mayor doesn't formally resign until an exception has been granted by the local council, Hegdal was in theory still formally mayor. She had not requested an exception from the local council a week after her resignation and even asserted that she was still mayor. She gave her statement to the police on 27 September. The police closed their investigation on 25 October.

Hegdal later attended a meeting on 12 September with her local party chapter to discuss her situation. According to NRK, Hegdal was said to be cross with the national party, who she deemed to have pressured her in the last two weeks, furthermore calling their behaviour "unacceptable". Following the meeting, the local chapter announced that they had unanimously agreed to oust Hegdal and would begin the process of finding a new mayoral candidate in time for the council meeting on 14 October. Hegdal was later reported to have resigned her party membership as well, leaving the coalition one seat short of a majority.

She formally applied for an exception from her position on 13 September. However, in early October the municipal director rejected her request after it was slightly reworded. The majority parties still expressed their intent to select a new mayor at the 14 October council meeting, but both them and the opposition parties remained uncertain about how to vote for Hegdal's exception given the municipal director's rejection of her application. By 9 October, a broad number of the parties from the coalition and opposition, had decided not to approve Hegdal's exception on 14 October, citing that it wasn't sufficient with what the local government act demanded. Hegdal later stated that she would amend her exception application so that it could be approved, which the coalition and opposition parties stated that they would support.

Tormod W. Losnedal was seen as the frontrunner to replace her and the local chapter officially confirmed on 1 October that he would be their nominee to replace Hegdal as mayor. He succeeded her on 14 October after her exception from the position was granted by the municipal council.

== Personal life ==
Hegdal is originally from Harstad in Troms. She has two older siblings. She moved to Stavanger in 1992 after finishing her studies to become a lawyer. She is married and has three children.

Political offices
Preceded by Kari Nessa Nordtun	Mayor of Stavanger; 2023–2024	Succeeded by Tormod W. Losnedal
