= Wilhelm Christian Magelssen =

Norwegian Minister of Education (1926-1927)

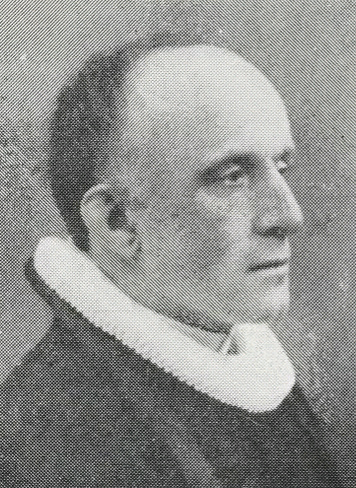

Minister of Education and Church Affairs
- In office 5 March 1926 – 25 December 1927
- Prime Minister: Ivar Lykke
- Preceded by: Ivar P. Tveiten
- Succeeded by: Ole Bærøe

Personal details
- Born: 12 January 1867 Søndre Land, Oppland, Sweden-Norway
- Died: 14 October 1930 (aged 63)
- Party: Conservative

Wilhelm Christian Magelssen (12 January 1867 – 14 October 1930) was a Norwegian priest and politician from the Conservative Party who served as Minister of Education and Church Affairs from 1926 to 1927.

== Biography ==
He held positions as priest and parish priest in various places in Northern Norway between 1905 and 1920, diocesan priest in Tromsø between 1920 and 1925, diocesan priest in Stavanger 1925–1926, and he was parish priest in Vestre Aker 1928–1930. Magelssen also served as Minister of Education and Church Affairs in the cabinet of Ivar Lykke from 5 March 1926 to 25 December 1927. He was also a member of the Lordships Boards of Fredriksvern (Stavern), Langesund and Dverberg for some periods.
