= Kari Nessa Nordtun =

Norwegian lawyer and politician

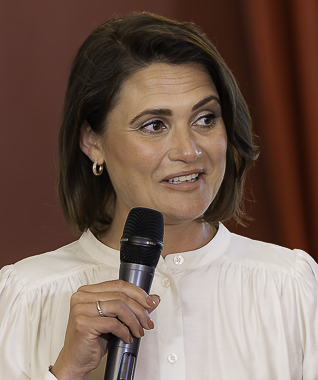
- Nordtun in 2024

Minister of Education
- Incumbent
- Assumed office 16 October 2023
- Prime Minister: Jonas Gahr Støre
- Preceded by: Tonje Brenna

Mayor of Stavanger
- In office 21 October 2019 – 23 October 2023
- Deputy: Dagny Sunnanå Hausken
- Preceded by: Christine Sagen Helgø
- Succeeded by: Sissel Knutsen Hegdal

Personal details
- Born: 7 June 1986 (age 40) Stavanger, Rogaland, Norway
- Party: Labour
- Spouse: Espen Ertzeid
- Children: 3
- Education: University of Bergen

Kari Nessa Nordtun (born 7 June 1986) is a Norwegian lawyer and politician for the Labour Party. She currently serves as minister of education since 2023 and was mayor of Stavanger from 2019 to 2023.

== Political career ==
=== Local politics and mayoralty ===
Nordtun was elected to the Stavanger Municipal Council in 2011. She became mayor following the 2019 local elections, in which the Labour Party secured a majority with the Socialist Left Party, Centre Party, Red Party, Green Party and People's Action No to More Road Tolls. Alongside Nordtun, the Centre Party's Dagny Sunnanå Hausken became deputy mayor. Both formally stepped into their roles on 21 October 2019. Nordtun sought re-election in the 2023 local elections, but ultimately her coalition lost to the Conservative one, led by Sissel Knutsen Hegdal. Despite this, the Labour Party in Stavanger achieved their best result in over 40 years and became the municipality's largest party. Hegdal succeeded her when the municipal council was constituted on 23 October.

=== Party politics ===
In 2022, Nordtun was appointed chair of the Labour Party's energy commission.

Ahead of the 2023 Labour Party convention, Nessa Nordtun was nominated to become a member of the party's central board. She formally stepped into the role in May.

Following the 2023 local elections and her imminent departure as mayor of Stavanger, Nordtun was seen as a strong candidate for a ministerial job in Jonas Gahr Støre's cabinet at the next reshuffle. Nordtun herself has been hesitant to outright confirm if she would accept a ministerial appointment, citing she would rather spend time with her family. However, the weekend before the reshuffle, media sources confirmed that Nordtun had undergone a vetting process with the Office of the Prime Minister, implying she likely would enter government after all.

Nordtun has been considered a rising star in the Labour Party and a possible future leader or prime minister. There has been speculation about whether or not she would seek to be on the ballot from Rogaland for the upcoming 2025 parliamentary election, something she ultimately in late August 2024 announced that she wouldn't be seeking.

=== Minister of Education ===
Nordtun was appointed minister of education on 16 October 2023, following a cabinet reshuffle.

==== 2023 ====
Early into her tenure, Nordtun announced that the government would be changing the rules and terms for private owned kindergartens. She argued that this was to secure higher quality and more equal economic terms as public kindergartens. She also announced that the government would recommend schools to forbid phones to be used in classrooms with the exception of extraordinary circumstances. Additionally she announced that the government would backtrack on scrapping state funding for charter schools, with the intention to make a new arrangement to ensure financial support.

In December, the government announced that they would crack down on Russ celebrations. Nordtun elaborated that they would be aiming to have celebrations take place after exams rather than before, in addition to possibly banning Russ clothing, which she and the government argued could be grounds for social exclusion. She also urged municipalities, schools and parents to work together to ensure more inclusion in celebrations.

==== 2024 ====
Nordtun and her local chapter announced in late January that they would desire to implement mandatory community service and conscription for youths. The current scheme allows for exceptions for those who wanted to be conscripted or not, and she also specified that community service could be done in any field one would desire. The reasoning was said to be about youths "doing their duty" and to get more young people into work. The reception to the proposal were mixed. The Progress Party's Youth drew comparisons to slavery, while the Norwegian Young Conservatives expressed support for the proposal. Their leader, Ola Svenneby, went as far as to say that the Young Conservatives should adopt a similar policy. The Workers' Youth League didn't outright support the proposal, but called it a refreshing policy proposal.

Nordtun announced in March that the government would be seeking to amend previously proposed legislation about teacher intervention, which would allow teachers to intervene in psychical altercations between students. Previous legislation had been criticised for being to vague in this area by the Union of Education. The amendment would more broadly define how teachers can intervene in student altercations.

Nordtun announced in April that government would be working across five ministries in order to secure a national scheme for school meals, which would go through state funding and be available to all students. She emphasised that local schools would be able to decide themselves if they would want to implement the scheme and receive extra resources so that it won't effect the teachers' jobs.

Together with labour minister Tonje Brenna, Nordtun announced in September the government's plans to improve schools. Among the proposals were more focus on psychical books, more practical learning, strengthening the teacher's authority over class and social issues, and more support measures and activities for academically weak and strong students.

Nordtun expressed in early October that the school system could see a decrease from ten years to nine years in order to improve the use of resources which could improve the quality of education. She also confirmed that the government had put down a commission to look into how to improve the education system, including the advantages and disadvantages of a possible shorter tenure spent in school.

She and digitalisation minister Karianne Tung met representatives of technology companies Google, Meta, Snapchat and TikTok in December to discuss how to best protect children on social media and age restrictions on their platforms. Norwegian media reported that there were tensions between the ministers and the representatives at times during the meeting. Nordtun notably accused the companies of not doing enough to protect children online and said that the government would expect them to take more responsibility. She furthermore claimed that if changes weren't done swiftly, parents would be "fighting a losing battle if the balance of power becomes unstable".

==== 2025 ====
Following media coverage of bullying cases in upper secondary schools, Nordtun outlined in February that schools should be supplied with competent assistance in order to tackle bullying. She also expressed that parents should have an more active role in shielding children from social media until they're mature enough to handle its contents. Furthermore, she criticised the judicial aspect, which by a law amendment in 2017, had in practise given more power to the students and emphasising the student's subjective opinion in bullying cases and the schools' active obligation to intervene in such instances.

Later in February, Nordtun presented the government's new law proposal regarding schools, which would allow teachers to intervene psychically during verbal attacks or disorderly conducts by students.

She announced in March that the government would be moving upper secondary exams to May, the month traditionally associated with Russ celebrations, affirming that this was a move to ensure more focus on exams for youths and attempt to reduce Russ celebrations during this period of time. The move came despite professional advise against such a change, something Nordtun also conceded could receive mixed reception.

During the Labour Party's 2025 convention in April, Nordtun and prime minister Jonas Gahr Støre announced several proposed changes to elementary schools, including: removing mapping tests (kartleggingsprøver) for grades one to four, make the same grades all-day school, ask for an evaluation of the consequences of removing digitalisation as a basic need for the youngest students and legislate the right for physical school books. Nordtun argued that digitalisation had received a too dominant presence in schools, while the Conservatives argued that mapping tests helps teachers and parents find students that may be struggling with classes and that removing it would eliminate this as a tool for them.

In June, Nordtun called for a change in the school system were schools should be able to inform each other about transferring students with a violent record. The argument is that students like this should be allocated to different classes and that schools could be better prepared to tackle potentially violent or problematic students if they transfer to new schools. Nordtun elaborated on that an amendment to the law would encompass students' general transference between schools and transitioning from lower to upper secondary school.

Her push for changes to Russ celebrations and for it to take place after exams rather than before, came partially to fruition in July when Russ in Eastern Norway, her native Stavanger and Bergen, announced that they would be commencing celebrations on 15 May the following year, rather than earlier then said date. The government had during the spring decided that exams should be pushed forward to accommodate Russ celebrations after the exam period.

Nordtun faced criticism in September by the Norwegian Federation of Organisations of Disabled People and the Socialist Left Party over not tackling the issue of gated playgrounds in several Fredrikstad elementary schools, which had been set up by the municipality due to lack of capacity for disabled children. Nordtun responded, saying that she had trust in the municipality to handle the issue after receiving feedback for their measures.

==== 2026 ====
In January 2026, she expressed concerns over the rise of use of artificial intelligence in schools. She argued that there should be age restrictions for certain AI tools and that the government was considering tighter and clearer state control.

Nordtun caused some controversy in May, when after meeting with representatives of the support group of victims of the 2022 Oslo shooting, who had proposed an educational project of the shooting, she was alleged to make comparisons of budget cuts to swimming lessons for children to support of the victims of the shooting. Nordtun later explained that her point had been that there will be tighter economic restrictions on what can be done going forwards. Furthermore, she emphasised that there "are many good causes that deserve support", but that the government doesn't necessarily have the means to support it. Later that same month, she wore a tank top in a social media post in solidarity with female students at a school in Tromsø who had been banned from wearing Tank tops.

In August, she advised municipalities and primary schools to ban Meta and other smartglasses, highlighting the importance of students' safety and the priority for them to learn reading, writing and arithmetic.

== Civic career ==
After her formal education to become a lawyer, Nordtun worked for the law firm Sjødin, Meling & Co. and then for Elden DA. She notably served as an assistant attorney for victims and survivors of the 22 July attack. She is on leave from her profession as a lawyer to focus on political work.

== Personal life and education ==
Nordtun is the daughter of former Stavanger mayor and member of parliament Tore Nordtun and Solveig Nessa. She also has a sister, Eli Nessa. She is married to Espen Ertzeid, with whom she has three sons.

Nordtun attended Stavanger Cathedral School and went on to become a lawyer through studying at the University of Bergen.

Political offices
Preceded by Christine Sagen Helgø	Mayor of Stavanger; 2019–2023	Succeeded by Sissel Knutsen Hegdal
Preceded by Tonje Brenna	Minister of Education; 2023–present	Incumbent
