= Ivar Petterson Tveiten =

Norwegian politician

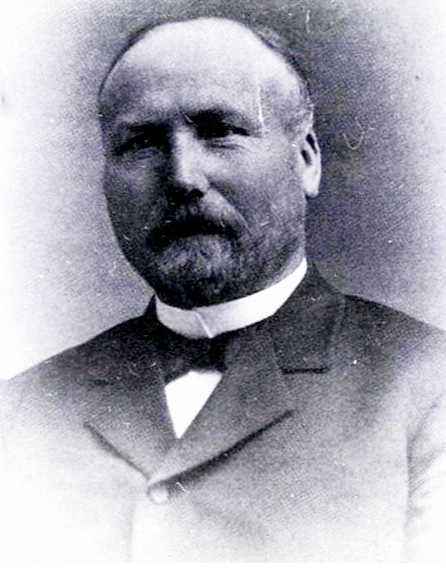

Minister of Education and Church Affairs
- In office 25 July 1924 – 5 March 1926
- Prime Minister: J. L. Mowinckel
- Preceded by: Karl Sanne
- Succeeded by: Wilhelm Magelssen

President of the Storting
- In office 1 January 1916 – 31 December 1921 Serving with Martin Olsen Nalum, Johan Ludwig Mowinckel, Gunnar Knudsen, Otto B. Halvorsen, Anders Buen and Ivar Lykke
- Prime Minister: Gunnar Knudsen; Otto B. Halvorsen; Otto Blehr
- Preceded by: Søren T. Årstad; Jørgen Løvland; Gunnar Knudsen
- Succeeded by: Ivar Lykke; Otto B. Halvorsen

Personal details
- Born: 18 December 1850 Moland Municipality, Telemark, Sweden-Norway
- Died: 17 April 1934 (aged 83) Fyresdal Municipality, Telemark, Norway
- Party: Liberal
- Spouse: Aasne Olavdotter Momrak (m. 1886)

Ivar Petterson Tveiten (18 December 1850 – 17 April 1934) was a Norwegian teacher and elected official of the Liberal Party who served as President of the Norwegian Parliament from 1916 to 1921. He also served as Minister of Education and Church Affairs from 1924 to 1926.

== Biography ==
Tveiten was born in Moland Municipality in Telemark, Norway. He was the son of Petter Veum (1811–89) and Tone Lislestog (1827–53). He graduated from the Kviteseid School (Kviteseid Seminar) in 1868. He served as a teacher from 1868 to 1883. In 1875, he acquired the farm Tveiten Vestre in Liegrend (Tveiten vestre Gnr. 88/2).

He was elected to Parliament as a representative of Bratsberg amt (now called Telemark) from 1903 to 1924. He was Vice President 1916, President 1917-1920 and Chairman of the Presidency in 1920.

Tveiten was made a member of the Order of St. Olav Order in 1914. He died during 1934 and was buried in the cemetery at Veum Church in Fyresdal.
