= Treschow (Norwegian family) =

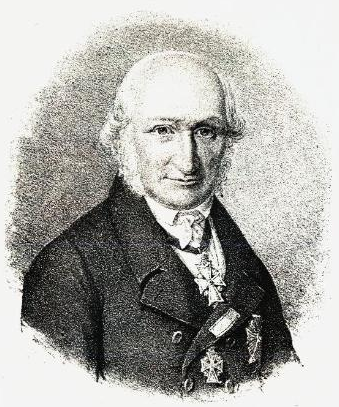
Philosopher and politician Niels Treschow (1751–1833)

Treschow is a Norwegian family descended from Just Hermansen Treschow, a merchant in Moss. This family is not known to be related to a different Treschow family in Norway. Its most famous member was philosopher and politician Niels Treschow (1751–1833), the grandson of Just Hermansen Treschow and son of merchant Peter Treschow (1718–73).
