= Leif Johan Sevland =

Norwegian politician (born 1961)

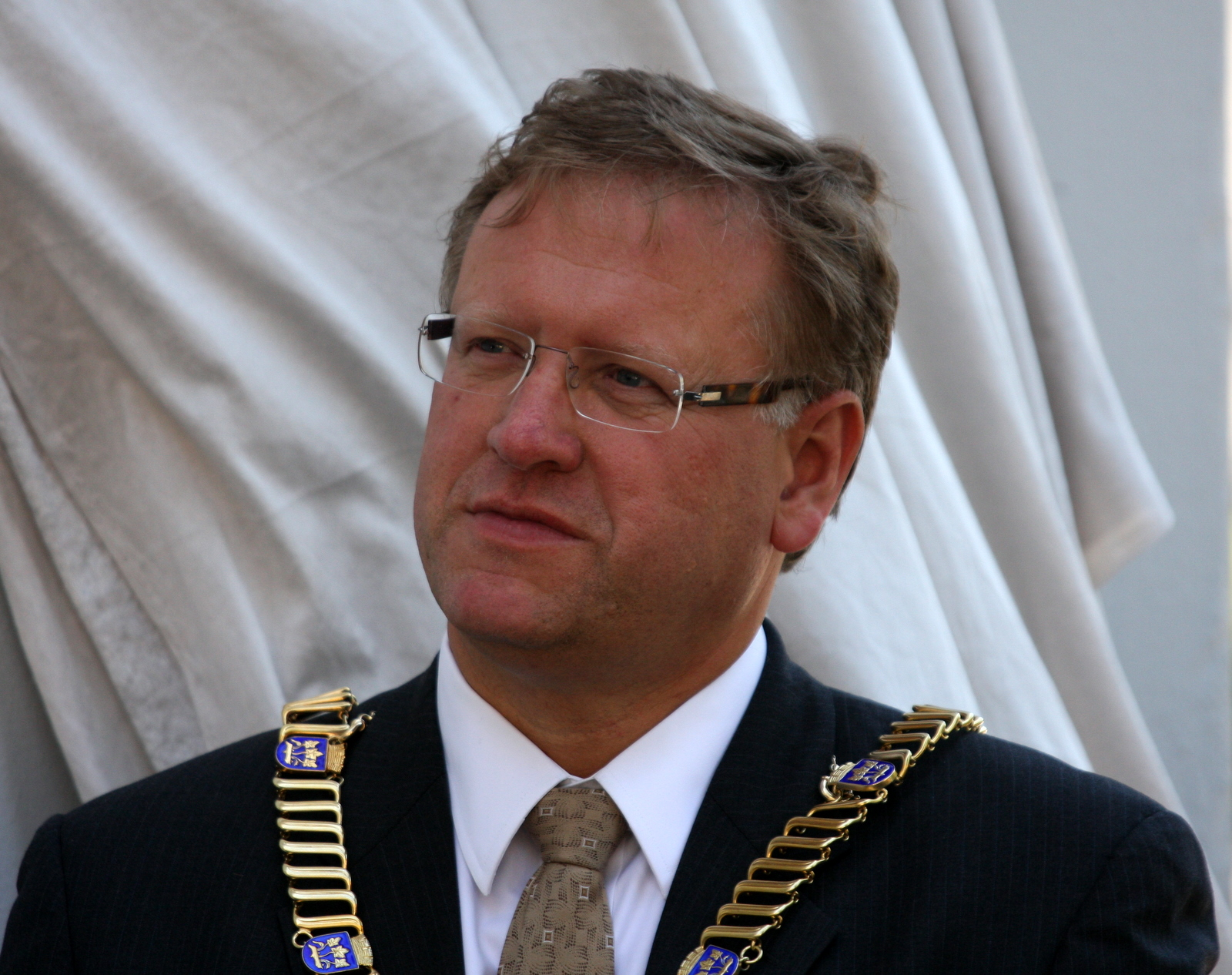
- Born: 13 September 1961 (age 64); Karmøy, Norway
- Education: University of Stavanger
- Occupation: Business Executive
- Employer: ONS Foundation
- Known for: Mayor of Stavanger, Norway 1995 – 2011.
- Political party: Høyre
- Spouse: Anne Selnes

Leif Johan Sevland (born 13 September 1961 in Karmøy) is a Norwegian business leader and former politician for the Conservative Party (Høyre). He served as Mayor of Stavanger from 1995 to 2011. Since 2012, he has been the president and CEO of the Offshore Northern Seas Foundation (ONS). In November 2014, he was also appointed Honorary Consul for the Republic of France.

== Mayor of Stavanger ==
Sevland was elected to the municipal council of Stavanger Municipality in 1987 and became mayor in 1995. He was re-elected in the municipal elections of 1999, 2003, and 2007, serving a total of 16 consecutive years as mayor until he chose not to run for re-election in 2011.

During his time in office, Sevland became a prominent advocate for the oil and energy industry. Stavanger and the surrounding region saw a significant number of new oil and oil service companies established during his tenure. He held various board positions aimed at promoting regional business development.

He also co-initiated the World Energy Cities Partnership in the mid-1990s and served as its president for seven years. He was a strong proponent of major cultural and educational initiatives, such as the Stavanger Concert Hall and the Norwegian Petroleum Museum, and Stavanger was named European Capital of Culture in 2008. Sevland was also central to the establishment of the University of Stavanger.

== Political career ==
Sevland began his political career in the Young Conservatives (Unge Høyre), initially as chair of Karmøy Unge Høyre, later becoming deputy chair of Stavanger Unge Høyre, and eventually serving as chair of Rogaland Unge Høyre from 1983 to 1988.

He was a member of the Rogaland County Council from 1988 to 1999, chair of Stavanger Høyre from 1989 to 1994, and chair of Rogaland Høyre from 1994 to 1998. Sevland also served as a deputy representative to the Norwegian Parliament (Stortinget) for Rogaland in the periods 1985–1989 and 1993–1997, meeting for a total of 7 months in 1994/1995.

== President and CEO of ONS Foundation ==
In 2012, Sevland was appointed president and CEO of the Offshore Northern Seas (ONS) Foundation. Under his leadership, ONS has evolved from a meeting place for the oil and gas industry into a global energy forum that fosters dialogue on geopolitics, energy and climate. The ONS conference gathers ministers, senior political leaders, global thinkers and energy executives. In 2024, the event featured approximately 1,150 speakers across nine conference arenas. The exhibition highlights all forms of energy and has actively promoted renewable solutions and energy transformation. In 2024, ONS hosted 1,200 exhibitors and welcomed over 70,000 visitors.

Sevland has also led the foundation into international strategic partnerships with institutions such as the Munich Security Conference and CERAWeek, organizing recurring events in collaboration with them.

== General references ==
- Lerøen, Bjørn Vidar (red.) (2011). Lyseblå kjempe i vest og i verden. Leif Johan Sevland 50 år. Stavanger Høyre.
