= Bjørg Tysdal Moe =

Norwegian politician (born 1954)

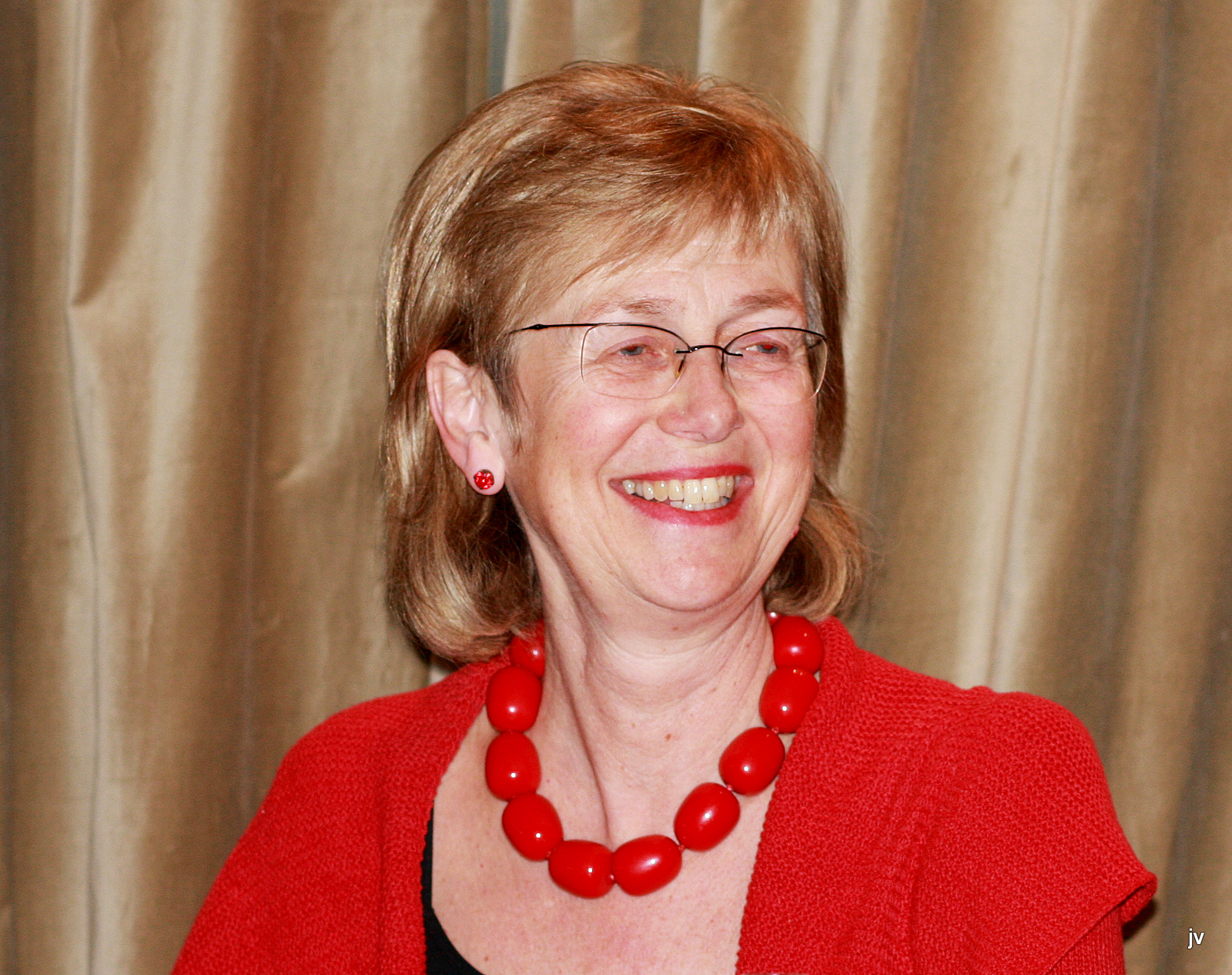
Bjørg Tysdal Moe, March 2009.

Bjørg Tysdal Moe (born 6 March 1954) is a Norwegian politician for the Christian Democratic Party.

She served as a deputy representative to the Parliament of Norway from Rogaland during the term 2005–2009. She was also the deputy mayor of Stavanger between 1999 and 2019, and the deputy leader of the Norwegian Association of Local and Regional Authorities from 2008 to 2012.
