= Niels Treschow =

Norwegian philosopher, educator and politician

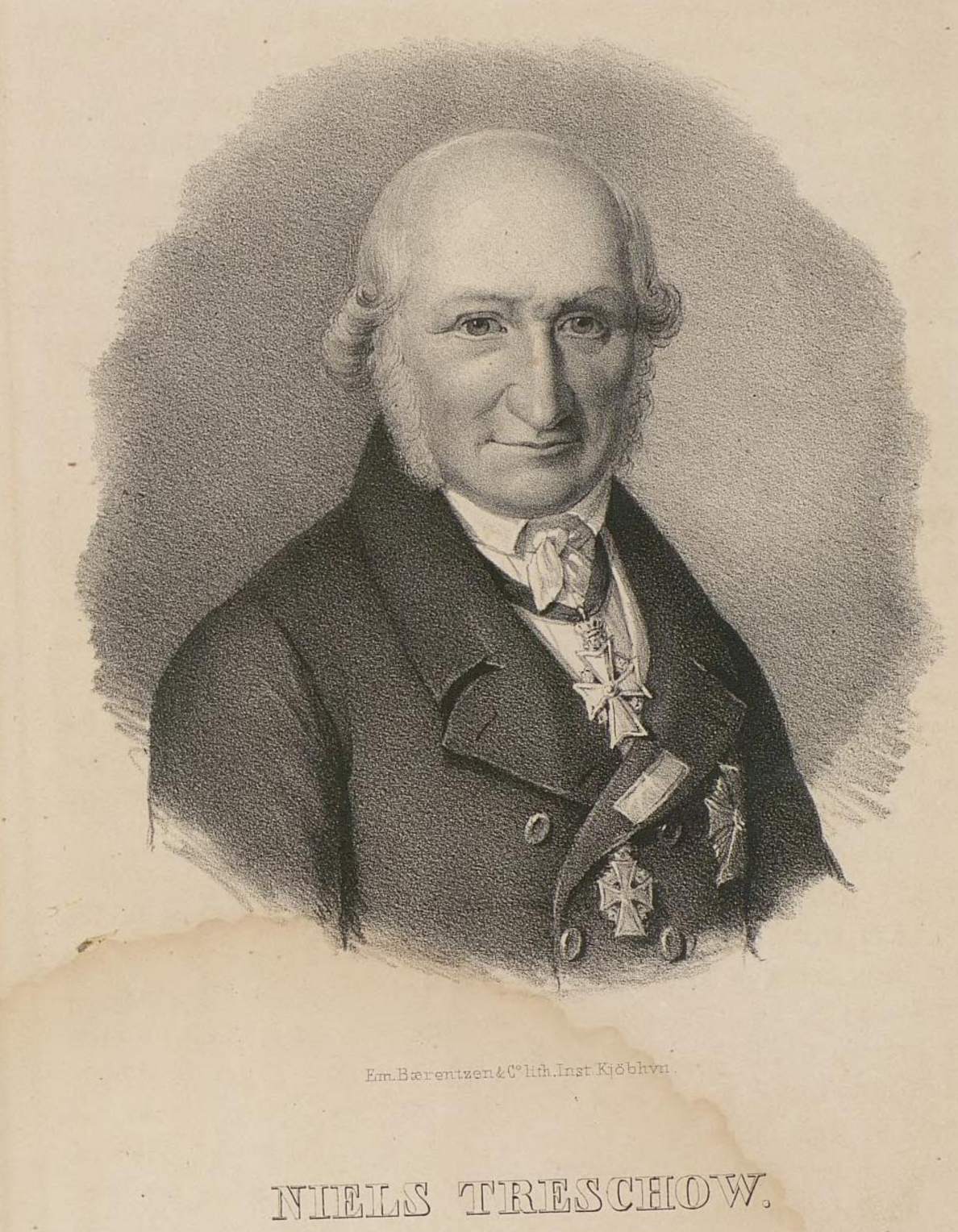
Niels Treschow

Niels Nicolas Treschow (5 September 1751 – 22 September 1833) was a Norwegian philosopher, educator and politician.

== Biography ==
Treschow was born in Strømsø, now part of Drammen in Buskerud. He was the son of Peter Treschow (1718-1773) who was a merchant. He took his student examation in 1766 and was awarded a Master's Degree in philosophy in 1774. Treschow was rector at the Trondheim Cathedral School from 1774-1780 and later served as an educator in Oslo and Copenhagen.

He became a professor at the newly established University of Oslo in 1813 and as one of initially only five professors was influential in forming the university during its first period. Today, the main building of the Faculty of Humanities at the University of Oslo bears his name.

He served as Minister of Education and Church Affairs 1814–1816, 1817–1819, 1820–1822 and 1823–1825, and member of the Council of State Division in Stockholm 1816–1817, 1819–1820, and 1822–1823. He was elected a member of the Royal Norwegian Society of Sciences and Letters in 1790. In 1825, he was elected a member of the Royal Swedish Academy of Sciences. He was decorated with both theCommander's Cross of the Order of the North Star and the Knight's Cross of Order of the Dannebrog.

== Selected works ==
- Forsøg om Guds tilværelse af theoretiske grunde: i anledning af den kantiske philosophie (1794)
- Philosophiske Forsøg (1805)
- Moral for Folk og Stat (1810–12)
- Om Philosophiens Natur og Dele: en dogmatisk og historisk Indledning til denne Videnskab (1811)
- Om den menneskelige Natur i Almindelighed, især dens aandelige Side (1812)
- Almindelig Logik (1813)
- Christendommens Aand, eller Den evangeliske Lære: frimodig og upartisk beskreven (1828)

== Other sources ==
- Christophersen, H. O (1977) Niels Treschow, 1751-1833: En tenker mellom to tidsaldrer (Grøndahl & Søn Forlag) ISBN 978-8250402706
- Norway and the Norwegians, Treschow —His writings — Anthropology — Eilschow by Robert Gordon Latham, (published 1840 by R. Bentley in London) pp. 149–153.
