= Karl Sanne =

Norwegian politician

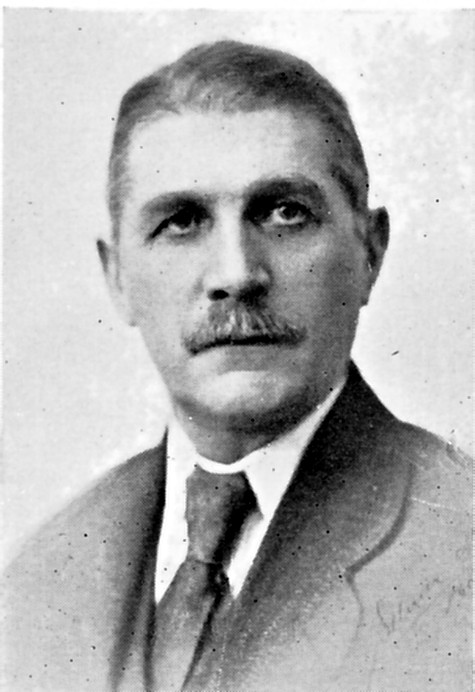

Minister of Education and Church Affairs
- In office 12 December 1923 – 25 July 1924
- Prime Minister: Abraham Berge
- Preceded by: Ivar B. Sælen
- Succeeded by: Ivar P. Tveiten

Member of the Norwegian Parliament
- In office 1 January 1922 – 31 December 1927
- Constituency: Lister og Mandal
- In office 1 January 1919 – 31 December 1921
- Constituency: Lister og Mandal
- In office 1 January 1913 – 31 December 1915
- Constituency: Lister og Mandal

Personal details
- Born: 26 January 1869 Farsund, Lister og Mandal, Sweden-Norway
- Died: 29 June 1945 (aged 76)
- Party: Conservative
- Spouse: Signe Koren

Karl Sanne (26 January 1869 – 29 June 1945) was a Norwegian farmer and politician of the Conservative Party who served as Minister of Education and Church Affairs from 1923 to 1924.

== Biography ==
He took part in the farm and banking work of his foster father in Vanse, before eventually taking over the farm Bryne and serving as treasurer at Vanse Sogns Sparebank in 1897. He held a number of positions besides his political activity. Sanne was a member of the Supervisory Board of Svelvik and Strøms Sparebank from 1927 to 1937.

Sanne was a member of the municipal council of Vanse Municipality from 1886 to 1907 and again from 1910 to 1917, deputy mayor of Vanse Municipality 1907–1910, member of the municipal council of Lista Municipality from 1918–1919, mayor of Lista Municipality from 1919–1922, and a member of the municipal council of Svelvik Municipality from 1931–1937. For some time, he served as the chairman of the Collective Party's organization in Lister og Mandal county and a member of the Conservative Party central board from 1915. Sanne was elected to the Storting from the constituency of Lister and Mandal for the terms 1913–1915 and 1919–1921 and from Vest-Agder from 1922–1927. In 1923, he was appointed Minister of Education and Church Affairs following Ivar B. Sælen’s death. He held this post until July 1924, when Prime Minister Abraham Berge resigned.
