= Ivar Bergersen Sælen =

Norwegian politician (1855–1923)

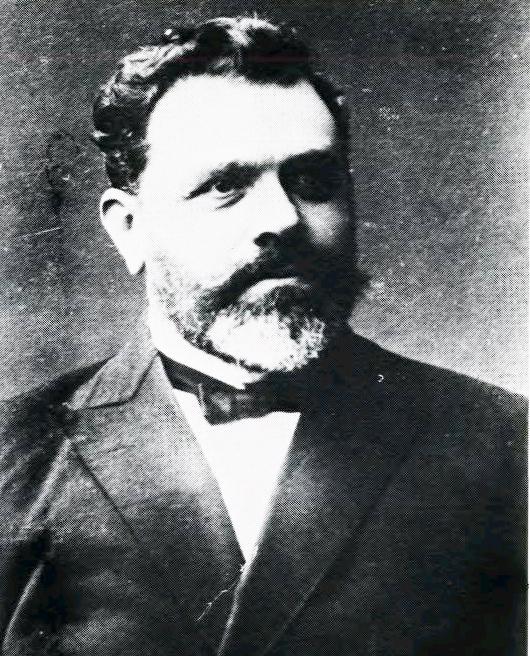

Minister of Education and Church Affairs
- In office 6 March 1923 – 24 November 1923
- Prime Minister: Otto B. Halvorsen; Abraham Berge
- Preceded by: Martin Olsen Nalum
- Succeeded by: Karl Sanne

Member of the Norwegian Parliament
- In office 1 January 1901 – 31 December 1906
- Constituency: Søndre Bergenshus

Personal details
- Born: 19 November 1855 Lindås, Hordaland, Sweden-Norway
- Died: 24 November 1923 (aged 68) Kristiania, Norway
- Party: Conservative
- Spouse: Anna Løvås

Ivar Bergersen Sælen (19 November 1855 – 24 November 1923) was a Norwegian politician from the Conservative Party who served as Minister of Education and Church Affairs from March 1923 until his death in November the same year.

== Biography ==
Sælen was born at Åsgard in Lindaas Municipality, where his father was a farmer and builder. In 1863, the family moved to the farm Sælen in the Fyllingsdalen area of Fana Municipality. He attended Sogndal Folk High School before becoming a farmer at Sælen in 1877.

He was the mayor of Fana from 1908–1910 and again from 1914–1916. He was elected to the Storting from Søndre Bergenhus county for the 1901–1906 term and met as deputy representative for Wollert Konow from Midthordland in Søndre Bergenhus county from 1910–1912. Sælen then served as Minister of Education and Church Affairs from 6 March 1923 until his death on 24 November the same year.

In 1979, a bust of Sælen by Nils Aas, was erected in Fyllingsdalen.
