= Ministry of Education and Research (Norway) =

Government ministry of Norway

Royal Ministry of Education and Research
- Kunnskapsdepartementet; Det kongelige kunnskapsdepartement

Agency overview
- Formed: 30 November 1814; 211 years ago
- Jurisdiction: Government of Norway
- Headquarters: Oslo, Norway
- Ministers responsible: Kari Nessa Nordtun, Minister of Education; Sigrun Gjerløw Aasland, Minister of Research and Higher Education
- Agency executive: Dag Thomas Gisholt, Secretary General
- Website: Official website

The Royal Ministry of Education and Research (Norwegian: Kunnskapsdepartementet, KD; full name: Det kongelige kunnskapsdepartement) is a Norwegian government ministry responsible for education, research and kindergartens. The ministry was established in 1814 as the Royal Ministry of Church and Education Affairs.

The current Minister of Education is Kari Nessa Nordtun and the current Minister of Research and Higher Education is Sigrun Gjerløw Aasland, both of whom are of the Labour Party The department reports to the legislature (Stortinget).

== History ==
The ministry was established in 1814, following the dissolution of Denmark–Norway, in which the joint central government administration of the two formally separate but closely integrated kingdoms, had been based in Copenhagen. Originally named the Ministry of Church and Education Affairs, the ministry was the first of six government ministries established in 1814, and was also known as the First Ministry. The other ministries were the Ministry of Justice, the Ministry of Police, the Ministry of the Interior, the Ministry of Finance and the Ministry of War.

Norway was in a union with Sweden with a common foreign and defense policy until 1905, however church and educational policy was entirely the domain of each respective national government.

The ministry was previously responsible for church affairs, but this function was transferred to the Ministry of Culture in 2002. Responsibility for kindergarten policy was transferred to the ministry in 2006.

=== Name ===
The full formal name of the ministry is Det kongelige kunnskapsdepartement (lit. 'the royal ministry of knowledge'), but this name tends to be used only on formal occasions and in formal letters. In everyday speech the ministry is known by the short form Kunnskapsdepartementet ("the ministry of knowledge").

== Organisation ==
=== Political staff ===
As of September 2025, the political staff of the ministry is as follows:

- Minister of Education Kari Nessa Nordtun (Labour Party)
  - State Secretary Synnøve Mjeldheim Skaar (Labour Party)
  - State Secretary Øyvind Jacobsen (Labour Party)
  - State Secretary Sindre Lysø (Labour Party)
  - Political Adviser Ingrid Tønseth Myhr (Labour Party)
- Minister of Research and Higher Education Sigrun Gjerløw Aasland (Labour Party)
  - State Secretary Eileen Fugelsnes (Labour Party)
  - Political Adviser Munir Jaber (Labour Party)

=== Departments ===
The Ministry of Education and Research consists of six departments:

- Department of Schools and Kindergartens
- Department of Education, Training and Skills Policy
- Department of Administration and Strategic Priorities
- Department of Legal Affairs
- Department of Governance of Higher Education and Research Institutions
- Department of Higher Education, Research and International Affairs
- The Communication Unit

=== Subsidiaries ===
==== Subordinate agencies ====
The following government agencies are subordinate to the ministry:

- Norwegian Agency for Quality Assurance in Education, or Nasjonalt organ for kvalitet i utdanningen (Official site) conducts quality assurance of higher education institutions and tertiary vocational training, as well as recognition of degrees from foreign countries.
- Norwegian Agency for International Cooperation and Quality Enhancement in Higher Education, or Direktorat for internasjonalisering og kvalitetsutvikling i høyere utdanning (Official site) promotes international cooperation in higher education and research.
- Norwegian State Educational Loan Fund, or Statens lånekasse for utdanning (Official site) awards loans and grants to students.
- Norwegian Universities and Colleges Admission Service, or Samordna opptak (Official site) coordinates admission to most undergraduate courses at state universities and colleges.
- Skills Norway, or Kompetanse Norge (Official site) works in areas such as adult education in basic skills, Norwegian language and socio-cultural orientation, vocational training, career advice and matching skills with the needs of the labour market.
- Sikt, or Norwegian Agency for Shared Services in Education and Research (Official site) runs information technology services in the research and education sectors.
- Research Council of Norway, or Norges forskningsråd (Official site) is responsible for research funding and research policy.
- The Norwegian National Research Ethics Committees, or De nasjonale forskningsetiske komiteene (Official site) are professionally independent agencies for questions regarding research ethics, and for investigating misconduct in all fields of study.
- Norwegian Directorate for Education and Training, or Utdanningsdirektoratetet (Official site) is responsible for the development of primary and secondary education. Approves the primary and secondary school curriculum.
- Statped (Official site) is a national service for special education for county municipalities and municipalities.
- National Parents' Committee for Kindergartens, or Foreldreutvalget for barnehager (FUB) (Official site) ensures that the voices of parents are heard in debates on kindergarten policy, and it also acts as the Ministry of Education and Research's advisory and consultative body representing parents interests.
- National Parents' Committee for Primary and Secondary Education, or Foreldreutvalget for grunnskolen (FUG) (Official site) ensures that the voices of parents are heard in debates on education policy, and it also acts as the Ministry of Education and Research's advisory and consultative body representing parents' interests.
- 22 July Centre, or 22. juli-senteret (Official site) is an information centre dedicated to the 2011 terrorist attacks in Norway, in Oslo and at Utøya.
- Norwegian Institute of International Affairs, or Norsk utenrikspolitisk institutt (Official site) Foreign policy research.
- VEA – State School for Gardeners and Florists, or Norges grønne fagskole - Vea (Official site) Educates gardeners and flower decorators at secondary school level.

==== Universities ====
- Nord University, or Nord universitet (Official site)
- Norwegian University of Life Sciences, or Norges miljø- og biovitenskapelige universitet (Official site)
- Norwegian University of Science and Technology, or Norges teknisk-naturvitenskapelige universitet (Official site)
- University of Bergen, or Universitetet i Bergen (Official site)
- University of Oslo, or Universitetet i Oslo (Official site)
- University of Stavanger, or Universitetet i Stavanger (Official site)
- University of Tromsø, or Universitetet i Tromsø (Official site)
- University of Agder, or Universitetet i Agder (Official site)
- Oslo Metropolitan University, or Oslomet – storbyuniversitet (Official site)
- University of South-east Norway, or Universitetet i Sørøst-Norge (Official site)
- University of Inland Norway, or Universitetet i Innlandet (Official site)

==== Specialised University Colleges ====
- Oslo School of Architecture and Design, or Arkitektur- og designhøgskolen i Oslo (Official site)
- Norwegian School of Economics, or Norges handelshøgskole (Official site)
- Norwegian School of Sport Sciences, or Norges idrettshøgskole (Official site)
- Norwegian Academy of Music, or Norges musikkhøgskole (Official site)
- Norwegian School of Veterinary Science, or Norges veterinærhøgskole (Official site)
- Oslo National Academy of the Arts, or Kunsthøgskolen i Oslo (Official site)
- MF Norwegian School of Theology, Religion and Society, or Det teologiske menighets fakultet (Official site)
- BI Norwegian Business School, or Handelshøyskolen BI (Official site)
- Molde University College, or Høgskolen i Molde - Vitenskapelig høgskole i logistikk (Official site)

==== University Colleges ====
- Sámi University of Applied Sciences, or Sámi allaskuvla (Official site)
- Volda University College, or Høgskulen i Volda (Official site)
- Western Norway University of Applied Sciences, or Høgskulen på Vestlandet (Official site)
- Østfold University College, or Høgskolen i Østfold (Official site)

==== Limited companies ====
- University Centre in Svalbard, or Universitetssenteret på Svalbard (Official site) conducts research and some university-level educational offerings in Arctic studies.
- Simula Research Laboratory (Official site) conducts research in the fields of networks and distributed systems, scientific computing, and software engineering.

== See also ==
- Minister of Education (Norway)
- Minister of Research and Higher Education
