= Cabinet Bondevik =

Cabinet Bondevik may refer to:

- First cabinet Bondevik
- Second cabinet Bondevik
