= Synnes =

Synnes is a surname. Notable people with the surname include:

- Arne Synnes (born 1940), Norwegian politician
- Harald Synnes (1931–2012), Norwegian politician
- Marianne Synnes (born 1970), Norwegian scientist and politician
