= David Hansen (Norwegian politician) =

Norwegian politician

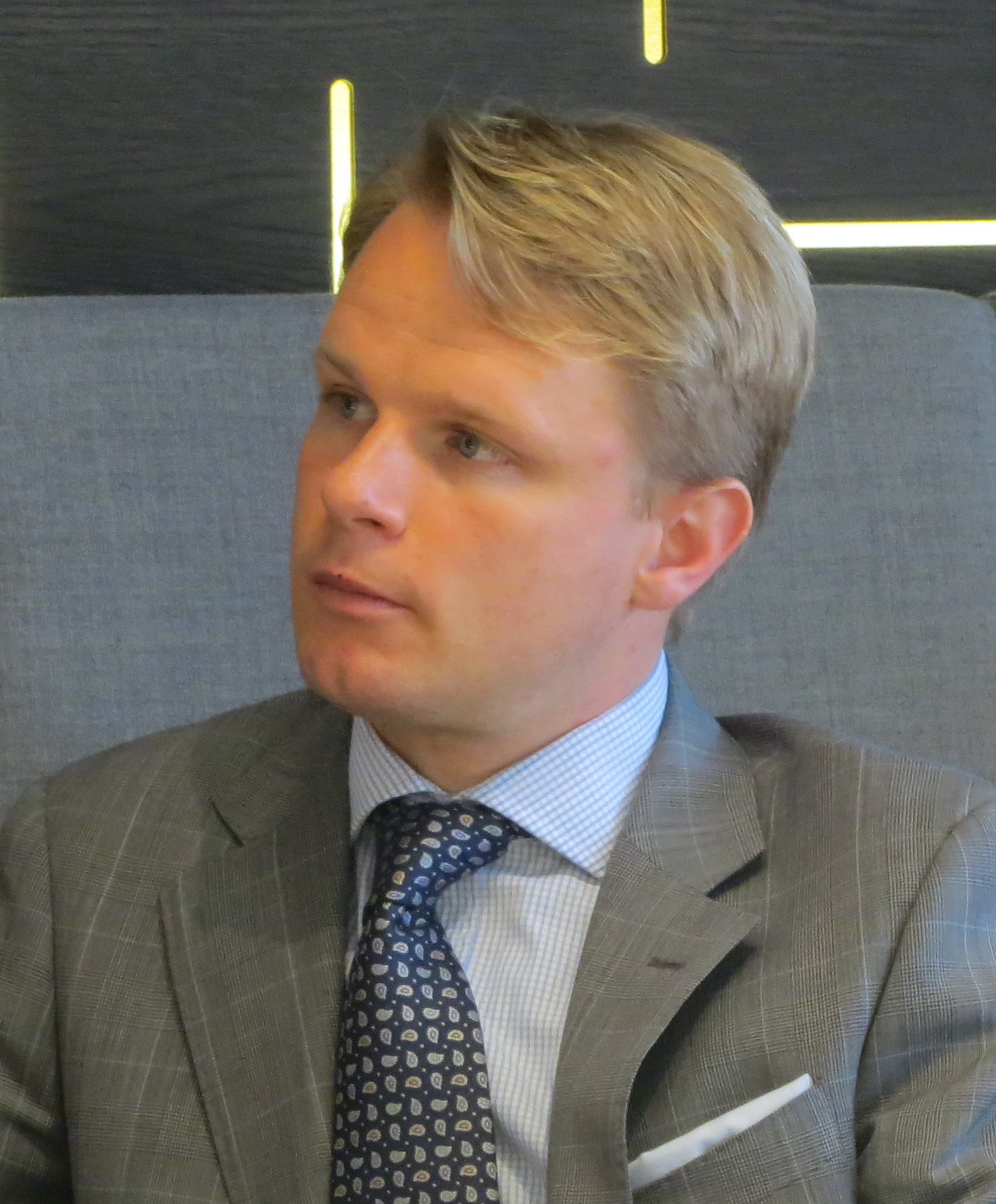
David Hansen

David Hansen (born 8 June 1978) is a Norwegian politician for the Christian Democratic Party.

From 1999 to 2002 he was the leader of the Youth of the Christian People's Party, the youth wing of the Christian Democratic Party. From 2005 to 2007 he chaired the Youth of the European People's Party.

He served as a deputy representative to the Norwegian Parliament from Østfold during the terms 1997–2001 and 2001–2005. During the second cabinet Bondevik, Hansen was appointed a political advisor in the Ministry of Foreign Affairs, for Minister of International Development Hilde Frafjord Johnson.

In 2007, following the local elections, Hansen won a seat in the Oslo city council.

David Hansen is married to Inger Lise Hansen, who is a Christian Democratic Party politician too.

Party political offices
Preceded by Øyvind Håbrekke	Leader of the Youth of the Christian People's Party; 1999–2002	Succeeded by Per Steinar Osmundnes
Preceded by Daniel Bautista	Leader of the Youth of the European People's Party; 2005–2007	Succeeded by Ioannis Smyrlis
