= Our Common Future =

Brundtland report

- Author: World Commission on Environment and Development
- Subject: Sustainability
- Publisher: Oxford University Press
- Publication date: 1987 October
- Pages: 383
- ISBN: 019282080X

Our Common Future, also known as the Brundtland Report, was published in October 1987 by the United Nations through the Oxford University Press. This publication was in recognition of Gro Harlem Brundtland, former Norwegian Prime Minister and Chair of the World Commission on Environment and Development (WCED).

Its targets were multilateralism and interdependence of nations in the search for a sustainable development path. The report sought to recapture the spirit of the Stockholm Conference of 1972, which had introduced environmental concerns to the formal political development sphere. Our Common Future placed environmental issues firmly on the political agenda: it aimed to discuss the environment and development as one single issue.

The document was the culmination of a "900-day" international exercise which catalogued, analysed, and synthesised written submissions and expert testimony from "senior government representatives, scientists and experts, research institutes, industrialists, representatives of non-governmental organizations, and the general public" held at public hearings throughout the world.

The report's definition of "sustainable development" is possibly the best-known definition of this concept:

Development that meets the needs of the present without compromising the ability of future generations to meet their own needs.

== Content ==
The Brundtland Commission's mandate, officially adopted at its inaugural meeting in Geneva on 1–3 October 1984, was to:

1. Re-examine the critical issues of environment and development and to formulate innovative, concrete, and realistic action proposals to deal with them;
2. [S]trengthen international cooperation on environment and development and to assess and propose new forms of cooperation that can break out of existing patterns and influence policies and events in the direction of needed change; and
3. [R]aise the level of understanding and commitment to action on the part of individuals, voluntary organizations, businesses, institutes, and governments.

The report noted that the Commission had "focused its attention in the areas of population, food security, the loss of species and genetic resources, energy, industry, and human settlements - realizing that all of these are connected and cannot be treated in isolation one from another". The report emphasized the interlocking relationship between economic, environmental, and social factors in human development.

The report recognized that human resource development in the form of poverty reduction, gender equity, and wealth redistribution was crucial to formulating strategies for environmental conservation, and it also recognized that environmental-limits to economic growth in industrialized and industrializing societies existed. The Brundtland Report asserts that poverty reduces sustainability and accelerates environmental pressures – creating a need for the balancing between economy and ecology.

The report defines sustainable development as "development that meets the needs of the present without compromising the ability of future generations to meet their own needs."

== Impact ==
The publication of Our Common Future and the work of the World Commission on Environment and Development laid the groundwork for the convening of the 1992 Earth Summit and the adoption of Agenda 21 and the Rio Declaration, and led to the establishment of the Commission on Sustainable Development.

In addition, key contributions of Our Common Future to the concept of sustainable development included the recognition that the many crises facing the planet are interlocking crises that are elements of a single crisis of the whole, and of the vital need for the active participation of all sectors of society in consultation and decisions relating to sustainable development.

However, in 1988, the Norwegian politician Helge Ole Bergesen wrote that this report is perceived by the Third World elites as green imperialism.

== See also ==
- National Round Table on the Environment and the Economy
