= Tronstad (surname) =

Tronstad is a surname of Norwegian origin. Notable people with the surname include:

- Bjørn Tronstad (born 1957), Norwegian footballer
- Elsbeth Tronstad (born 1956), Norwegian businessperson and politician
- Leif Tronstad (1903–1945), Norwegian scientist, intelligence officer and military organizer
- Sondre Tronstad (born 1995), Norwegian footballer

== See also ==
- Tronstad, a village in Viken, Norway
