= Ola T. Lånke =

Norwegian politician (born 1948)

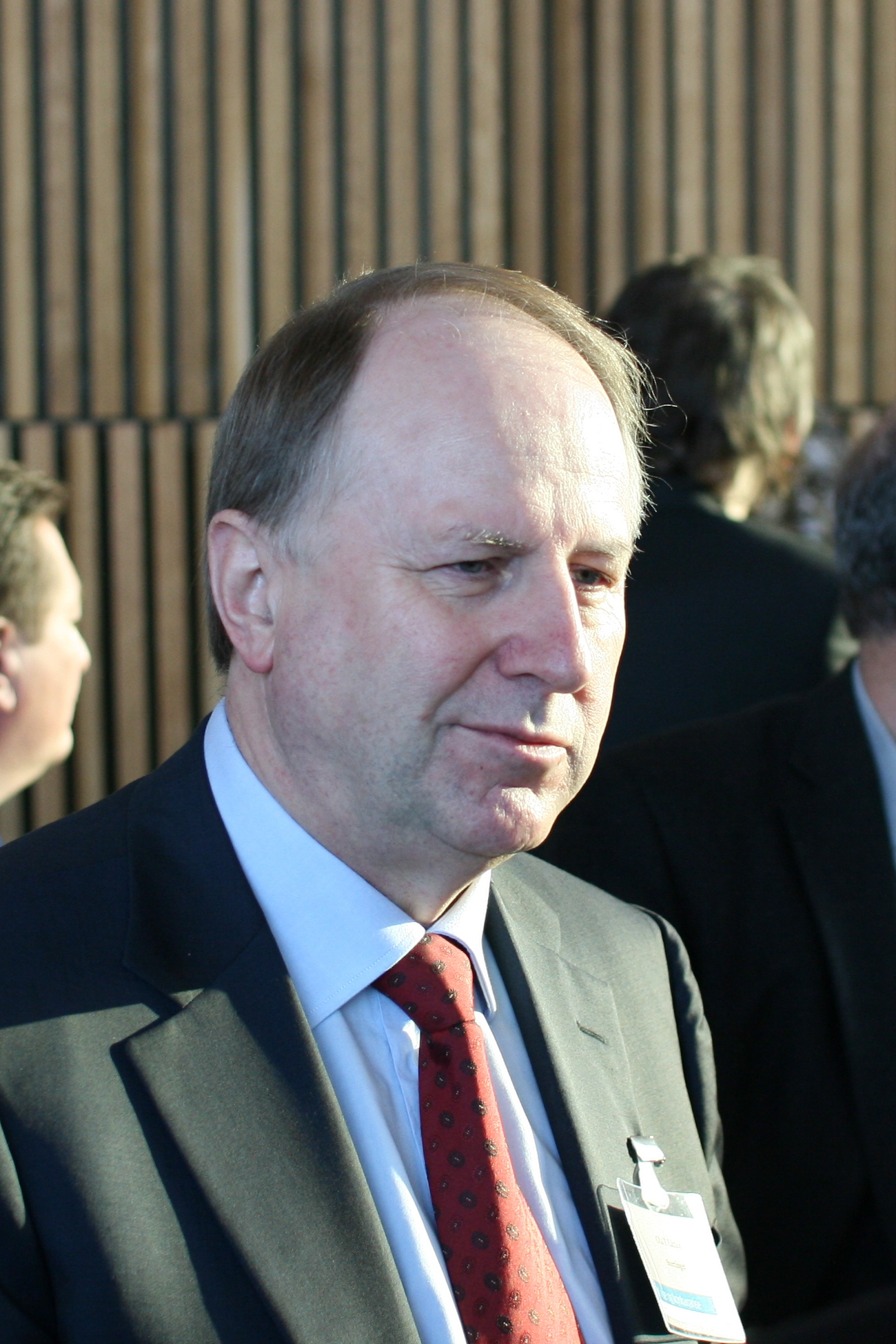
- Lånke in 2009.

Vice President of the Odelsting
- In office 2 October 2006 – 30 September 2009
- President: Inge Lønning
- Preceded by: Jon Lilletun
- Succeeded by: Position abolished

Member of the Norwegian Parliament
- In office 1 October 1993 – 30 September 2009
- Constituency: Sør-Trøndelag

Personal details
- Born: 18 March 1948 (age 77) Rennebu Municipality, Norway
- Party: Christian Democratic
- Parents: Arnt Lånke (father); Elise Randine Espås (mother)
- Occupation: Politician

Ola Torgeir Lånke (born 18 March 1948 in Rennebu Municipality) is a Norwegian politician for the Christian Democratic Party.

Lånke was elected to the Norwegian Parliament from Sør-Trøndelag in 1993, and has been re-elected on three occasions. On the local level he was a member of the municipal council of Trondheim Municipality from 1991 to 1993.

Lånke was the chairman of the Youth of the Christian People's Party, the youth wing of the Christian Democratic Party, from 1975 to 1976. Since 1997 he has been a member of the national Christian Democratic Party board.

Outside politics Lånke has worked as a priest, having graduated from the MF Norwegian School of Theology as cand.theol. in 1977.

Party political offices
Preceded by Ivar Molde	Chairman of the Youth of the Christian People's Party; 1975–1976	Succeeded by Idar Magne Holme
