= Leiv Lunde =

Norwegian politician (1961–2022)

Leiv Lunde (4 May 1961 – 30 September 2022) was a Norwegian political scientist and politician representing the Christian Democratic Party.

He served as State Secretary for developmental affairs in the Ministry of Foreign Affairs from 1997 to 2000 in the Bondevik's First Cabinet and in Bondevik's Second Cabinet from February to October 2005.

He was director of the Fridtjof Nansen Institute in Oslo from 2012 to 2014.
