= Rita Sletner =

Norwegian politician

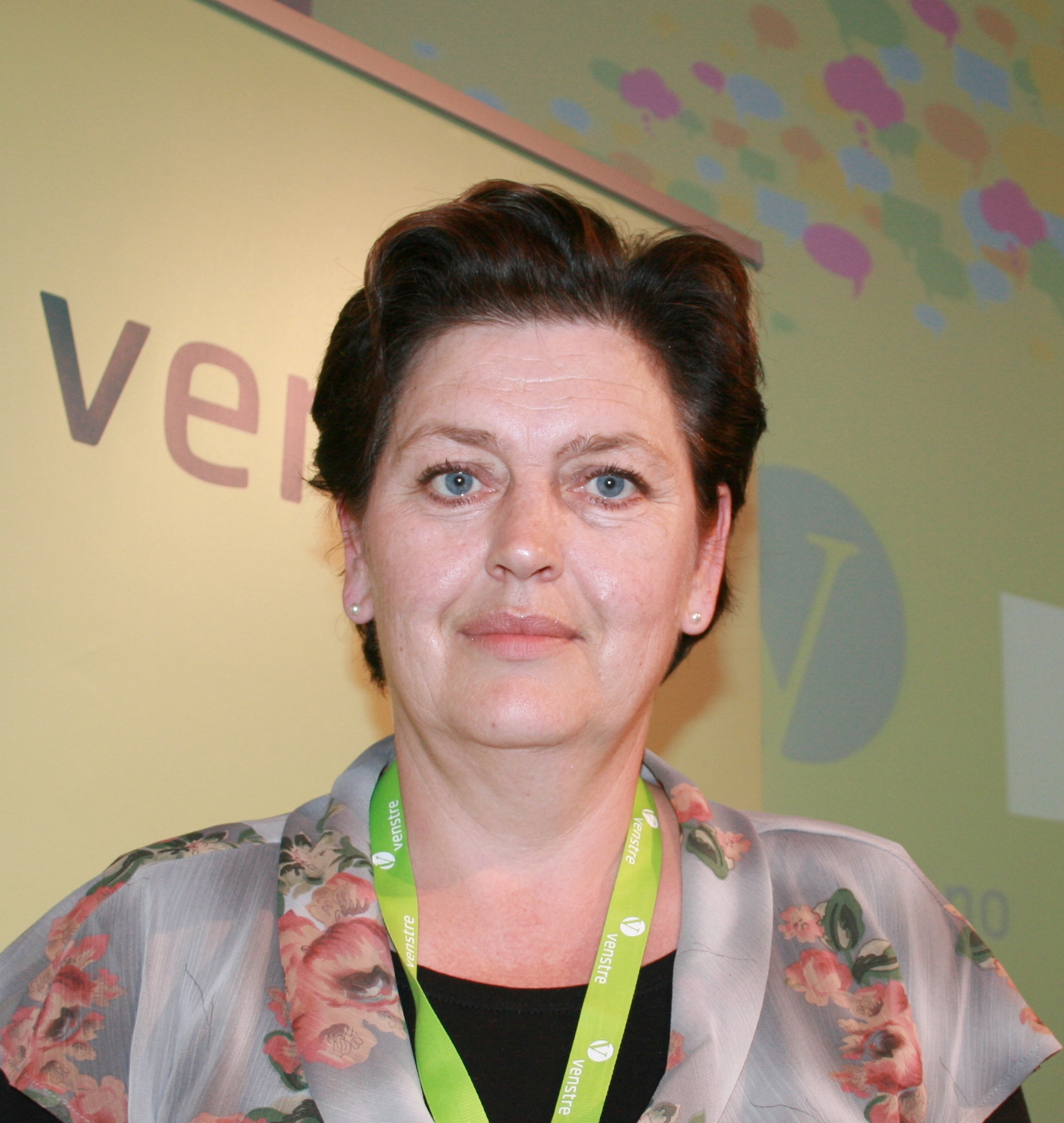
Rita Sletner, 2009.

Rita Iren Sletner (born 1960) is a Norwegian politician for the Liberal Party.

She grew up in Bjørkelangen, married and settled in Mysen where she worked several years in a crisis centre. She was elected to Eidsberg municipal council and Østfold county council.

In the 2001 Norwegian parliamentary election, she headed the Liberal Party ballot in Østfold for the first time. She was not elected, but the Liberal Party managed to form Bondevik's Second Cabinet. Sletner was a State Secretary in the Ministry of Justice during the entire lifespan of the cabinet, from 2001 to 2005. Afterwards, Sletner became assisting secretary-general in the Liberal Party. She again spearheaded the Liberal Party ballot in Østfold in 2005 and 2009.

Sletner was named as leader of the committee that produced the Norwegian Official Report 2008:4 on policy against sexual violence. She was also a corporate council member of Vinmonopolet from 2007 through 2010. In 2009, she applied for the position as Gender Equality and Anti-Discrimination Ombud.
