= Arild Moe =

Norwegian political scientist (born 1955)

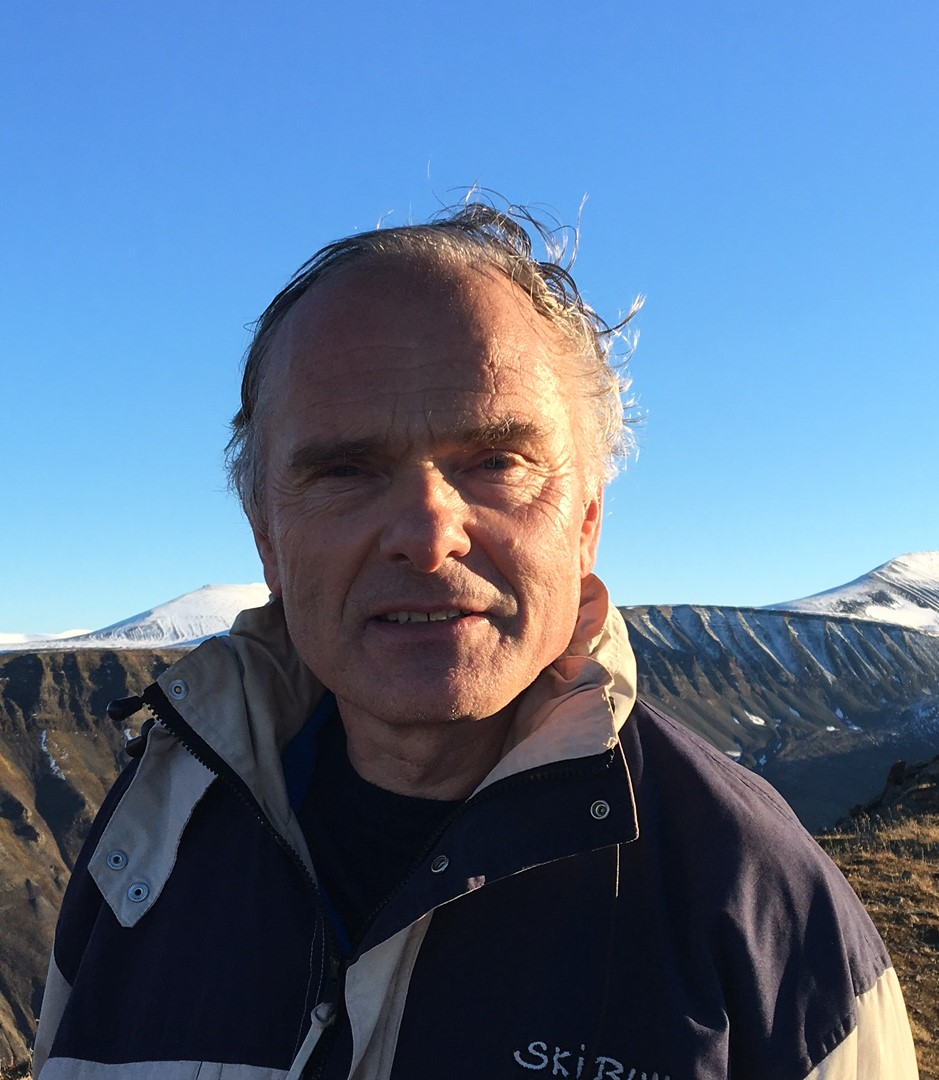

Arild Moe (born 1955) is a Norwegian political scientist and Senior Research Fellow at the Fridtjof Nansen Institute in Lysaker, Norway. He has an MSc. from the University of Oslo and has also studied Russian and public law. Moe has been affiliated with the Fridtjof Nansen Institute since 1983 and has been a Guest Researcher at Stanford University and Adjunct Associate Professor at the Norwegian University Center in Saint Petersburg.

Moe’s research focuses on oil and gas politics, with a particular emphasis on the Russian energy sector. He has followed closely the development and driving forces behind Arctic petroleum activities, Arctic shipping and the development of the Northern Sea Route, where he analyzes economic drivers as well as political and legal framework conditions. Moe’s work has also focused on Norwegian-Russian relations, cross-border environmental cooperation and Norway’s High North policy. Recently, Moe headed a research project analysing the interests of Asian states in the Arctic.

In March 2024, while participating in a scientific conference at Institute of World Economy and International Relations, Arild Moe publicly condemned Russian invasion of Ukraine.

== Selection of recent publications ==
- The Globalization of Russian Gas — Political and Commercial Catalysts, Cheltenham UK: Edward Elgar, 2019 (with J. Henderson).
- Asian Countries and Arctic Shipping: Policies, Interests and Footprints on Governance, Arctic Review on Law and Politics, Vol. 10, 2019, pp. 24-52. http://dx.doi.org/10.23865/arctic.v10.1374. (With O.S. Stokke)
- Does Russian unconventional oil have a future? Energy Policy, Volume 119, August 2018, Pages 41-50. Available at https://doi.org/10.1016/j.enpol.2018.04.021. (With V. A. Kryukov)
- Arctic Hydrocarbon Development: State Interests and Policies, in Svein Vigeland Rottem and Ida Folkestad Soltvedt (eds), Arctic Governance: Energy, Living Marine Resources and Shipping. London, I.B. Tauris, 2018, pp. 26-50. (with Dag Harald Claes and Svein Vigeland Rottem)
- Arctic Offshore Petroleum: Resources and Political Fundamentals, in Svein Vigeland Rottem and Ida Folkestad Soltvedt (eds), Arctic Governance: Energy, Living Marine Resources and Shipping. London, I.B. Tauris, 2018, pp. 9-25. (with Dag Harald Claes).
- Unitization of petroleum fields in the Barents Sea: Towards a common understanding? Arctic Review on Law and Politics, Vol 9, March 2018, pp. 72-96 (with Daniel Fjærtoft, Natalia Smirnova, Alexey Cherepovitsyn)
- Russia’s gas 'Triopoly': implications of a changing gas sector structure, Eurasian Geography and Economics, Vol 58, No 4, 2017, pp. 442—468 (With James Henderson)
- Voyage Through the North: Domestic and International Challenges to Arctic Shipping, in K. Keil and S. Knecht (eds), Governing Arctic Change. London: Palgrave Macmillan, 2017, pp. 257—278.
- Organization and Management Challenges of Russia’s Icebreaker Fleet, Geographical Review, Vol 107, No 1, 2017, pp. 48-68 (with Lawson Brigham)
- Asylstrømmen fra Russland til Norge i 2015: Bevisst russisk politikk? ('The wave of asylum seekers from Russia to Norway in 2015: A deliberate Russian policy?' Nordisk Østforum, Vol 30, No 2, 2016, pp. 80-97. In Norwegian. (with Lars Rowe)
