= Anders Gåsland =

Norwegian politician (born 1968)

chairman of the Youth of the Christian People's Party
- In office 1992–1993

Personal details
- Born: 16 January 1968 (age 58) Rælingen, Norway
- Party: Christian Democratic Party; Liberal Party
- Occupation: psychiatrist
- Known for: promoter of gay rights in Norway

Anders Gaasland, formerly Anders Gåsland (born 16 January 1968) is a Norwegian politician, formerly for the Christian Democratic Party. Openly homosexual, he is considered an important promoter of gay rights in Norway.

== Life ==
He was born in Rælingen. In 1992, he took over as chairman of the Youth of the Christian People's Party, the youth wing of the Christian Democratic Party. In the autumn of 1992, he came out as a homosexual, in the prime time news programme Lørdagsrevyen. Shortly after, he was removed from the party ticket for the 1993 Norwegian parliamentary election. Originally willing to continue as chairman of the Youth of the Christian People's Party, he was pressured to resign from this position. He was succeeded by Andreas E. Eidsaa.

Gåsland later joined the Liberal Party. He was included on the party ticket in Oslo ahead of the 2001 parliamentary election, but was not elected. He works as a psychiatrist.

In 1993, he published the autobiographical book Alltid freidig which details his experience as a gay person in the Christian Democratic Party.

Party political offices
Preceded by Berit Aalborg	Chairman of the Youth of the Christian People's Party; 1992–1993	Succeeded by Andreas E. Eidsaa
