= Young Christian Democrats (Norway) =

Young Christian Democrats Kristelig Folkepartis Ungdom
- Chairperson: Ingrid Olina Hovland
- Founded: 8 December 1946
- Ideology: Christian democracy
- Colours: Yellow
- Mother party: Christian People's Party
- European affiliation: Youth of the European People's Party
- Nordic affiliation: Nordic Christian Democratic Youth (KDUN)
- Website: krfu.no

The Young Christian Democrats (Norway) (Norwegian: Kristelig Folkepartis Ungdom, KrFU) is the youth league of the Christian Democratic Party (Norwegian: Kristelig Folkeparti) in Norway, and was founded in 1933. The current leader of KrFU is Hadle Rasmus Bjuland. The organisation currently has approximately 2,000 members.

Ingvild Ofte Arntsen served as secretary-general of the organization from 2012-2014. Mathea Fjukstad Hansen took over that job in 2014.

== Leadership ==
Leader

- Ragnar Horn 1946–1948
- Jon Arnøy 1948–1949
- Ivar Wang-Erlandsen 1949–1950 (acting)
- John Antonsen 1950–1954
- Aage Lunde 1954–1955
- Kåre Kristiansen 1955–1956 (acting)
- Odd Steinar Holøs 1956–1957
- Erling Danielsen 1957–1959
- Daniel Kristiansen 1959–1960
- Kjell Rønning 1960–1961
- Ole J. Søvik 1961–1963
- Per Høybråten 1963–1966
- Oddvar Hodne 1966–1968
- Sverre Pettersen 1968–1970
- Kjell Magne Bondevik 1970–1973
- Ivar Molde 1973–1975
- Ola T. Lånke 1975–1976
- Idar Magne Holme 1976–1979
- Dagfinn Høybråten 1979–1982
- Reidar Andestad 1982–1984
- Kristin Aase 1984–1986
- Svein Konstali 1986–1988
- Gunstein Instefjord 1988–1990
- Berit Aalborg 1990–1992
- Anders Gåsland 1992–1993
- Andreas E. Eidsaa jr. 1993–1996
- Øyvind Håbrekke 1996–1999
- David Hansen 1999–2002
- Per Steinar Osmundnes 2002–2005
- Inger Lise Hansen 2005–2007
- Kjell Ingolf Ropstad 2007–2010
- Elisabeth Løland 2010–2013
- Emil André Erstad 2013–2015
- Ida Lindtveit 2015–2017
- Martine Tønnessen 2017–2019
- Edel-Marie Haukland 2019–2021
- Hadle Rasmus Bjuland 2021–2025
- Ingrid Olina Hovland 2026–

Deputy leader

- Erik rønhovde 2023–

Organizational Deputy Leader

- Constanse Borge 2024–
