= Ragnar Horn =

Norwegian politician

Ragnar Horn (10 April 1913 – 24 January 2002) was a Norwegian politician for the Christian Democratic Party.

In 1946 he became the first chairman of the Youth of the Christian People's Party, the youth wing of the Christian Democratic Party.

He served as a deputy representative to the Norwegian Parliament from Oslo during the term 1958–1961.

Party political offices
Preceded by position created	Chairman of the Youth of the Christian People's Party; 1946–1948	Succeeded by Jon Arnøy
