= Kari Husøy =

Norwegian politician (born 1952)

Kari Husøy (born 10 July 1952) is a Norwegian politician for the Christian Democratic Party.

She was born in Bergen, and has a librarian's education. She worked as a secretary and advisor for the Christian Democratic Party's parliamentary group from 1983. She served herself in the position of deputy representative to the Parliament of Norway from Akershus during the term 1993–1997. She was appointed State Secretary in the Office of the Prime Minister during the Bondevik's First and Second Cabinet. In between the two cabinets, from 2000 to 2001, she led the party's parliamentary secretariat.

She was also a board member of the National Insurance Administration from 1993 to 1994. She resides at Bekkestua.
