= Per Høybråten =

Norwegian politician

Personal details
- Born: 8 March 1932 Nesodden, Norway
- Died: 21 December 1990 (aged 58) Nesodden, Norway
- Party: Christian Democratic Party

Per Høybråten (8 March 1932 – 21 December 1990) was a Norwegian politician for the Christian Democratic Party.

From 1963 to 1966 he was the chairman of the Youth of the Christian People's Party, the youth wing of the Christian Democratic Party. He served as a deputy representative to the Norwegian Parliament from Oslo during the term 1973–1977. On the local level, Høybråten was a member of Oslo city council from 1967 to 1987, serving as deputy mayor during the terms 1975–1979 and 1979–1983. He chaired the local party chapter from 1981 to 1983.

During the cabinet Borten, Høybråten was appointed State Secretary in the Ministry of Social Affairs from 1968. During the cabinet Korvald from 1971 to 1972, Høybråten again became State Secretary, this time at the Office of the Prime Minister.

He was born in Nesodden. Outside politics he worked as a veterinary, having graduated in 1956. He was prorector of the Norwegian School of Veterinary Science at one point. He was also involved in the Norwegian Association of Local and Regional Authorities, and was a member of the board of Norges Bank from 1985 to 1990.

His son Dagfinn Høybråten is a more prominent politician.

Party political offices
Preceded by Ole J. Søvik	Chairman of the Youth of the Christian People's Party; 1963–1966	Succeeded by Oddvar Hodne
