= Marit Elisebet Totland =

Norwegian politician

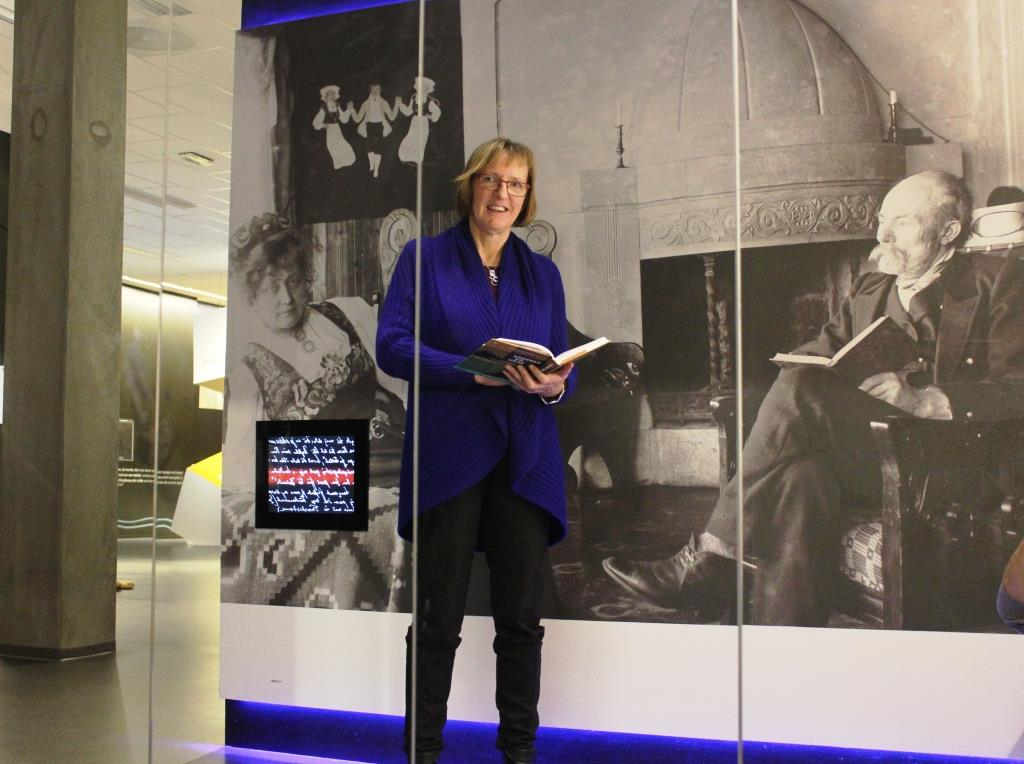
Marit Elisebet Totland

Marit Elisebet Totland (born 1957) is a Norwegian politician for the Christian Democratic Party.

She was elected to the municipal council of Bømlo Municipality in 1991, and became mayor in 1995. She still held that post when in 1997, during the first cabinet Bondevik, she was appointed State Secretary in the Ministry of Church Affairs, Education and Research. She lost that post with the cabinet change in 2000. In 2007 she was elected to the municipal council of Kvinnherad Municipality.
