= Willy Østreng =

Norwegian political scientist (born 1941)

Willy Østreng (born 4 May 1941) is a Norwegian political scientist.

Holding the cand.polit. degree, Østreng was employed as a researcher at the Fridtjof Nansen Institute in 1971. He went on to become managing director of the Fridtjof Nansen Institute from 1978 to 2003, and scientific director of the Centre for Advanced Study at the Norwegian Academy of Science and Letters from 2003 to 2009.

Østreng was also an adjunct professor at the University of Trondheim from 1994, and senior researcher in Ocean Futures from 2010. In 2008 he was a co-founder of the Norwegian Scientific Academy for Polar Research. His main field as a researcher has been the Barents Region.

Østreng was decorated as a Commander of the Order of the Lion of Finland in 1994.
