= Bjørn Haugstad =

Norwegian civil servant and politician

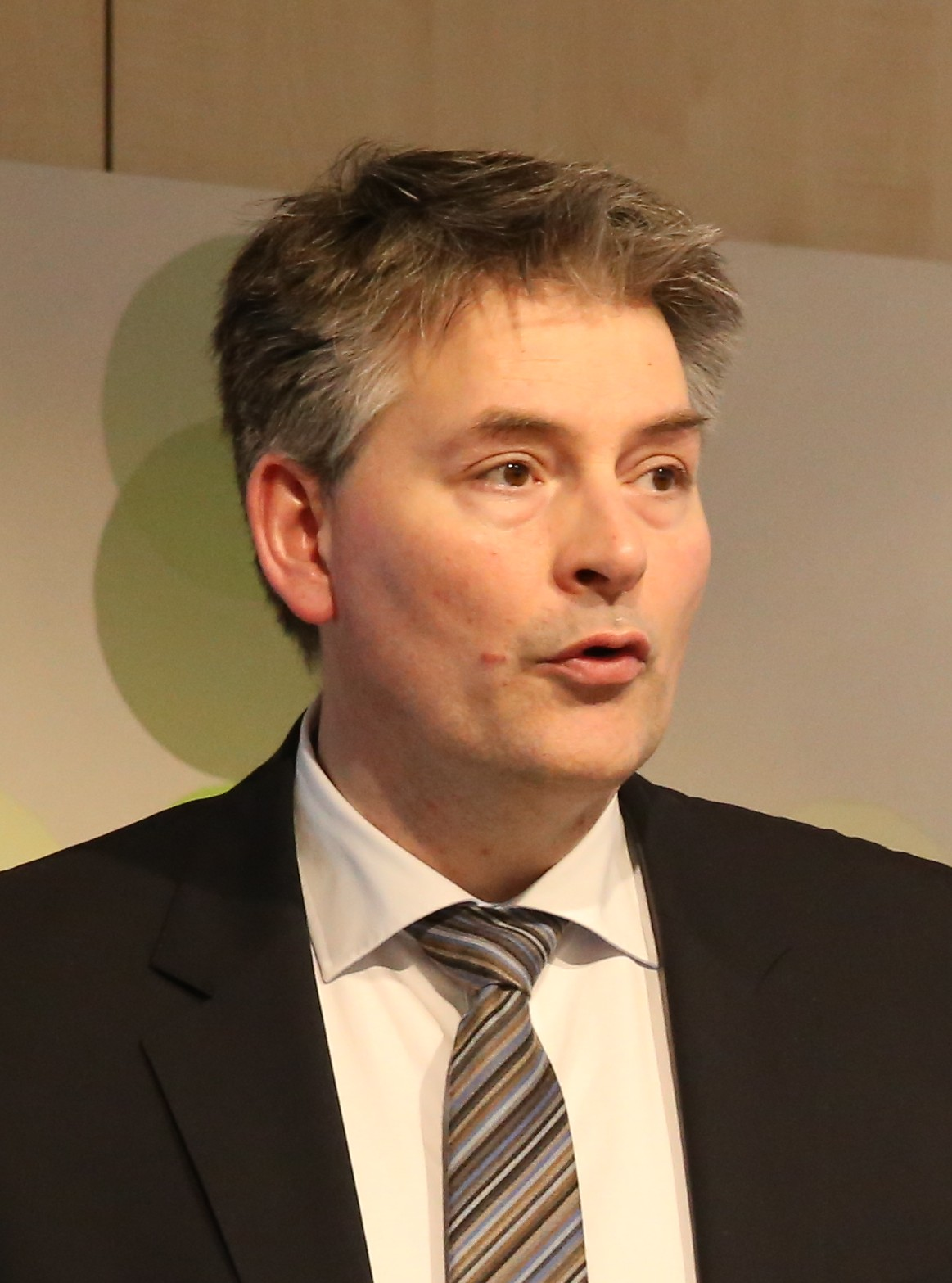
Bjørn Haugstad

Bjørn Haugstad (born 22 January 1969) is Director of Organisation and Infrastructure at the Norwegian University of Science and Technology (NTNU). He is a former Norwegian civil servant and politician for the Conservative Party.

He studied economics and took the siv.ing. degree in industrial economics in Trondheim. He later took his doctorate at Oxford University.

From 2001 to 2005 he served in Bondevik's Second Cabinet as a State Secretary in the Ministry of Education and Research. He was later research director at the University of Oslo from 2009 to 2013, then briefly a deputy under-secretary of state in the Ministry of Petroleum and Energy. He again became State Secretary in the Ministry of Education and Research in October 2013, in Solberg's Cabinet.
