= Iver B. Neumann =

Norwegian political scientist

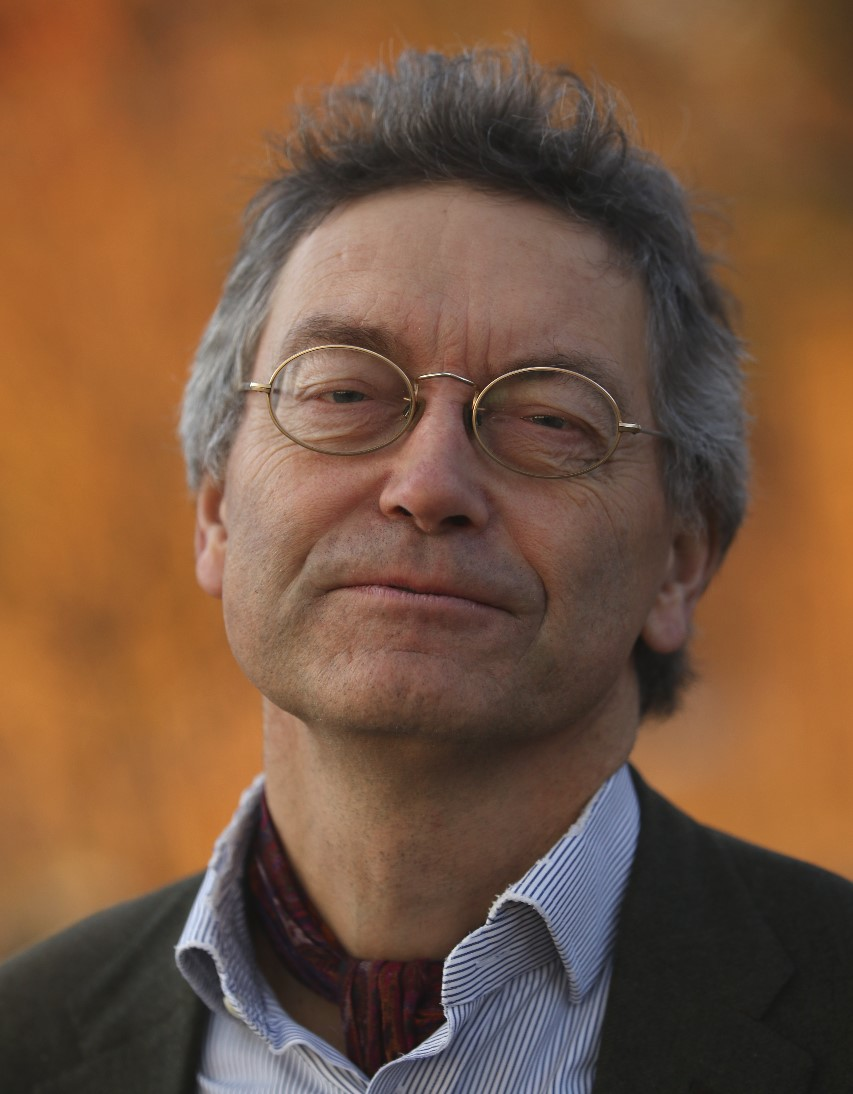
Iver B. Neumann. Photo: Jan D. Sørensen

Iver Brynild Neumann (born 10 October 1959) is a Norwegian political scientist and social anthropologist. He is Director of the Fridtjof Nansen Institute at Polhøgda, Lysaker, a position he has held since December 2019. From 2012-2017 he was the Montague Burton Professor of International Relations at the London School of Economics and Political Science. He has also served as Research Director and Director at the Norwegian Institute of International Affairs (NUPI) and adjunct professor in International Relations at the Norwegian University of Life Sciences.

== Early life and education ==
The son of Hjob Henrich Neumann (1914-1983), professor in Geology at the University of Oslo and Rigmor Neumann née Bakke (1925-2005), dentist, Neumann was born into a family of Norwegian civil servants and grew up in a Western suburb of Oslo. His early schooling was in the natural sciences (examen artium, Persbraaten Gymnas, Oslo, 1978).

Following two years of studying Russian at the Norwegian Army Language School (a NATO spin-off of the U. S. Defense Language Institute), he went in for the humanities. After studies in Russian, English, Social Anthropology and Political Science at the University of Oslo, he abandoned an M. Phil. Programme in English language and literature to finish an M.Phil. in Political Science (1987). He then went up to Oxford to study International Relations, in his own account in order to join the English School of International Relations theory, earning an M. Phil, in 1989 and a D. Phil. in 1992.

== Career ==
In 1988, while still a student, Neumann took up a job at the Norwegian Institute of International Affairs and began to publish extensively. Neumann’s doctoral work was on the role played by Europe in Russia’s identity formation and foreign policy, and resulted in two books, Russia and the Idea of Europe (1996) and Uses of the Other: ‘The East’ in European Identity Formation (1999). While the former is basically an empirical work detailing Russian debates on Europe from the Napoleonic Wars to Perestroyka, the latter is a work of post-structuralism, arguing that Europe is constituted, among other things, by its exclusion of others, first and foremost Ottomans and Russians. Neumann has maintained a presence in Russian Studies, serving as Professor of Russian Studies at Oslo University 2005-2008

In 1995/96, he won a Jean Monnet Fellow to the European University Institute in Florence 1995/96 on a project to study diplomacy. The project returned him to the study of social anthropology, and led to field work at the Norwegian Ministry of Foreign Affairs, first as a planner (1997/98), then as a senior adviser on European politics (2001-2003). The principal publications following from this work were the official centenary history of the Norwegian Ministry of Foreign Affairs and an ethnography of diplomacy, based on his second doctorate, in Social Anthropology, at the University of Oslo. Neumann argued that, while the diplomat’s knowledge production abroad is well understood in terms of information gathering, representation and negotiation, the knowledge production at home is of a standard bureaucratic kind, where so many parts of the Ministry are involved that different genres of documents look very similar and there is little or nothing by way of a receiver-specific message. The two modes of knowledge production have different genealogies and are quite different, so that the individual diplomat as well as the Foreign Service at large are stuck in a never-ending effort to reconcile the two.

Neumann has been institutionally active within the discipline of International Relations. He was the editor of the Norwegian IR journal Internasjonal politikk from 1993 to 1995, Cooperation and Conflict; Nordic Journal of International Relations from 1999 to 2003 and co-editor of the Routledge book series The New International Relations from 2005 to the present. He has published a string of books on IR, method and Norwegian foreign policy in his native Norwegian, and, from 2010 on, partook in launching the first Master’s programme in IR in his native country, at the Norwegian University of Life Sciences. He spent stints as visiting fellow at the London School of Economics in 1998 and at the University of Queensland in 2011, and was Visiting Professor at the University of Belgrade 2009-2011. Since 2003, Neumann has served as President of the Norwegian Oxford Committee, which awards the Norway Oxford Scholarship.

Using his early specialization in Russian-European relations a spring board, Neumann became a much-used commentator in Norwegian newspapers from the mid-1980s onwards, with a penchant for taking a losing stand in political battles. For example, he was the head of the Young European Federalists Norway in 1987, and a member of the board of the Norwegian European Movement during the second national referendum to return a ‘no’ to membership, in 1994.

Neumann became the focus of public debate in early August 2010 for criticizing the local opposition to a new main power supply running through the fjord area of Hardanger. This created an outcry in Western Norway, and Neumann's claim was dismissed as "arrogance" by the leader of the conservative party and as "nonsense" by a leading economist and a fellow political scientist.

On October 27, 2015, Neumann signed a petition along with 343 other academics based in the United Kingdom to boycott Israeli universities.

In 2016 he was inducted into the Norwegian Academy of Science and Letters.

In 2020 he received the Fridtjof Nansen Prize for Outstanding Research.

== Publications ==
- Russia and the Idea of Europe: A Study in Identity and International Relations London: Routledge, 1996. Second edition 2017.
- The Future of International Relations: Masters In The Making? London: Routledge, 1997 (co-edited with Ole Wæver). (Mandarin 2004, Czech 2005)
- Uses of the Other. The 'East' in European Identity Formation Minneapolis, MN: University of Minnesota Press, Borderline Series, 1999. (Russian 2004, Serbian 2011)
- Mening, materialitet, makt: En innføring i diskursanalyse Bergen: Fagbokforlaget, 2001. (Swedish 2003, Serbian 2009)
- Norge – en kritikk. Begrepsmakt i Europa-debatten Oslo: Pax, 2001.
- Aktiv og avventende. Utenrikstjenestens liv 1905-2005 Oslo: Pax, 2005 (co-authored with Halvard Leira).
- Harry Potter and International Relations (co-edited with Daniel Nexon). Lanham, Maryland: Rowman and Littlefield, 2006
- Governing the Global Polity: Practice, Mentality, Rationality. Ann Arbor, University of Michigan Press, 2010 (co-authored with Ole Jacob Sending).
- At Home with the Diplomats: Inside a European Foreign Ministry Ithaca: Cornell University Press, 2012.
- Undertaking Discourse Analysis for Social Research, with Kevin C. Dunn. (University of Michigan Press, 2016, ISBN 978-0-472-07311-5).
- The steppe tradition in international relations: Russians, Turks and European state-building 4000 BCE-2018 CE, Cambridge University Press, 2018.
- Power, Culture and Situated research methodology - Autobiography, Field, Text, with Cecilie Basberg Neumann. London: Palgrave Pivot, 2018
- Concepts of International Relations, for Students and Other Smarties, Ann Arbor, MI: University of Michigan Press, 2019.

== See also ==
- Norwegian Institute of International Affairs
- Political history
- Byzantine diplomacy
- English school of international relations theory
