= First Bondevik cabinet =

Government of Norway from 1997 to 2000

Bondevik's First Cabinet
- Cabinet of Norway

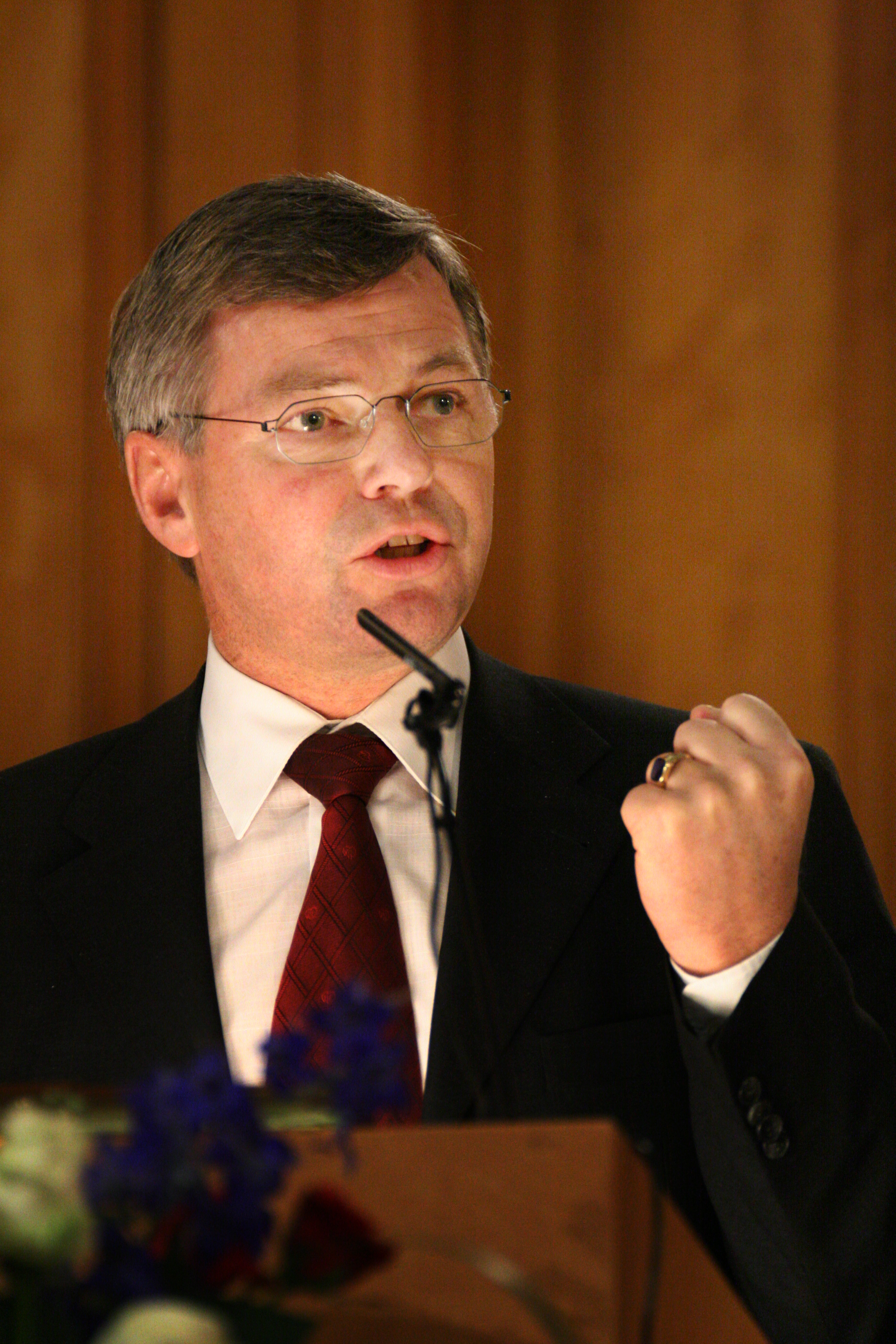
- Date formed: 17 October 1997
- Date dissolved: 17 March 2000

People and organisations
- King: Harald V of Norway
- Prime Minister: Kjell Magne Bondevik
- Ministers removed: 7
- Total no. of members: 26
- Member parties: Centre Party; Christian Democratic Party; Liberal Party
- Status in legislature: Coalition (minority)

History
- Election: 1997 parliamentary election
- Legislature term: 1997–2001
- Predecessor: Jagland's Cabinet
- Successor: Stoltenberg's First Cabinet

Bondevik's First Cabinet governed Norway between 17 October 1997 to 17 March 2000. It was led by Prime Minister Kjell Magne Bondevik, and consisted of the Christian Democratic Party, the Centre Party and the Liberal Party. There was a major reshuffle in March 1999. It had the following composition:

== Cabinet members ==
Cabinet
| Portfolio | Minister | Took office | Left office | Party |
|---|---|---|---|---|
| Prime Minister | Kjell Magne Bondevik (Note: Bondevik was on leave due to a depressive reaction from 31 August to 23 September 1998. As his deputy, Anne Enger served as acting prime minister during that time.) | 17 October 1997 | 17 March 2000 | Christian Democratic |
| Deputy to the Prime Minister | Anne Enger | 17 October 1997 | 8 October 1999 | Centre |
| Deputy to the Prime Minister | Odd Roger Enoksen | 8 October 1999 | 17 March 2000 | Centre |
| Minister of Foreign Affairs | Knut Vollebæk | 17 October 1997 | 17 March 2000 | Christian Democratic |
| Minister of Finance | Gudmund Restad | 17 October 1997 | 17 March 2000 | Centre |
| Minister of Defence | Dag Jostein Fjærvoll | 17 October 1997 | 15 March 1999 | Christian Democratic |
| Minister of Defence | Eldbjørg Løwer | 15 March 1999 | 17 March 2000 | Liberal |
| Minister of Justice and the Police | Aud Inger Aure | 17 October 1997 | 15 March 1999 | Christian Democratic |
| Minister of Justice and the Police | Odd Einar Dørum | 15 March 1999 | 17 March 2000 | Liberal |
| Minister of Transport and Communications | Odd Einar Dørum | 17 October 1997 | 15 March 1999 | Liberal |
| Minister of Transport and Communications | Dag Jostein Fjærvoll | 15 March 1999 | 17 March 2000 | Christian Democratic |
| Minister of Local Government and Regional Development | Ragnhild Queseth Haarstad | 17 October 1997 | 16 March 1999 | Centre |
| Minister of Local Government and Regional Development | Odd Roger Enoksen | 16 March 1999 | 17 March 2000 | Centre |
| Minister of Education and Church Affairs | Jon Lilletun | 17 October 1997 | 17 March 2000 | Christian Democratic |
| Minister of Culture | Anne Enger | 17 October 1997 | 8 October 1999 | Centre |
| Minister of Culture | Åslaug Haga | 8 October 1999 | 17 March 2000 | Centre |
| Minister of Social Affairs | Magnhild Meltveit Kleppa | 17 October 1997 | 17 March 2000 | Centre |
| Minister of Health | Dagfinn Høybråten | 17 October 1997 | 17 March 2000 | Christian Democratic |
| Minister of Children and Family Affairs | Valgerd Svarstad Haugland | 17 October 1997 | 17 March 2000 | Christian Democratic |
| Minister of Labour and Government Administration | Eldbjørg Løwer | 17 October 1997 | 15 March 1999 | Liberal |
| Minister of Labour and Government Administration | Laila Dåvøy | 15 March 1999 | 17 March 2000 | Christian Democratic |
| Minister of International Development | Hilde Frafjord Johnson | 17 October 1997 | 17 March 2000 | Christian Democratic |
| Minister of Agriculture | Kåre Gjønnes | 17 October 1997 | 17 March 2000 | Christian Democratic |
| Minister of Trade and Industry | Lars Sponheim | 17 October 1997 | 17 March 2000 | Liberal |
| Minister of the Environment | Guro Fjellanger | 17 October 1997 | 17 March 2000 | Liberal |
| Minister of Petroleum and Energy | Marit Arnstad (Note: Arnstad was on leave from 26 March to 28 August 1998. Anne Enger was acting minister during that time.) | 17 October 1997 | 17 March 2000 | Centre |
| Minister of Fisheries | Peter Angelsen | 17 October 1997 | 21 January 2000 | Centre |
| Minister of Fisheries | Lars Peder Brekk | 21 January 2000 | 17 March 2000 | Centre |
| Minister of Nordic Cooperation | Ragnhild Queseth Haarstad | 17 October 1997 | 16 March 1999 | Centre |
| Minister of Nordic Cooperation | Peter Angelsen | 16 March 1999 | 21 January 2000 | Centre |
| Minister of Nordic Cooperation | Kåre Gjønnes | 21 January 2000 | 17 March 2000 | Christian Democratic |

== State Secretaries ==
| Ministry | State Secretary | Period (Note: Unless otherwise noted, the period was 17 October 1997 to 17 March 2000.) | Party |
|---|---|---|---|
| Office of the Prime Minister | Kari Husøy | | Christian Democratic |
| Office of the Prime Minister | Gunnar Husan | | Christian Democratic |
| Office of the Prime Minister | Odd Jostein Sæter | | Christian Democratic |
| Office of the Prime Minister | Jarle Skjørestad | – 29 March 1999 | Centre |
| Office of the Prime Minister | Åslaug Haga | 29 March 1999 – 8 October 1999 | Centre |
| Office of the Prime Minister | Per Tore Woie | 27 October 1997 – | Liberal |
| Office of the Prime Minister | Anna Kristine Jahr Røine | 18 October 1999 – | Centre |
| Office of the Prime Minister | Tore Killingland | 25 February 2000 – | Liberal |
| Ministry of Foreign Affairs | Åslaug Haga | – 29 March 1999 | Centre |
| Ministry of Foreign Affairs | Jarle Skjørestad | 29 March 1999 – | Centre |
| Ministry of Foreign Affairs | Leiv Lunde | 23 October 1997 – | Christian Democratic |
| Ministry of Foreign Affairs | Janne Haaland Matlary | 6 November 1997 – | Christian Democratic |
| Ministry of Foreign Affairs | Wegger Christian Strømmen | 12 February 1999 – | Christian Democratic |
| Ministry of Defence | Ommund Heggheim | 29 October 1997 – 15 March 1999 | Christian Democratic |
| Ministry of Defence | Kjell Alvheim | 19 March 1999 – | Liberal |
| Ministry of Industry and Trade | Harriet E. Berg | | Liberal |
| Ministry of Industry and Trade | Odd Hellesnes | 27 October 1997 – 13 April 1999 | Liberal |
| Ministry of Industry and Trade | Hans Tormod Antonsen | 23 April 1999 – | Liberal |
| Ministry of Labour and Government Administration | Kjell Alvheim | – 15 March 1999 | Liberal |
| Ministry of Labour and Government Administration | Helge Eide | 22 March 1999 – 18 October 1999 | Christian Democratic |
| Ministry of Labour and Government Administration | Jostein Solberg | 25 October 1999 – | Christian Democratic |
| Ministry of Finance | Arne Synnes | – 15 October 1999 | Christian Democratic |
| Ministry of Finance | Tori Hoven | 23 October 1997 – 5 December 1997; 30 September 1998 – 1 January 2000 | Liberal |
| Ministry of Finance | Brynjulf Moe | 5 December 1997 – 30 September 1998 | Liberal |
| Ministry of Finance | Helge Eide | 18 October 1999 – | Christian Democratic |
| Ministry of Finance | Endre Skjørestad | 1 January 2000 – | Centre |
| Ministry of Finance | Reinert Andreas Leirvik | 17 January 2000 – | Liberal |
| Ministry of Local Government and Regional Development | Johanne Gaup | 23 October 1997 – | Centre |
| Ministry of Local Government and Regional Development | Per N. Hagen | 23 October 1997 – 10 May 1999 | Centre |
| Ministry of Local Government and Regional Development | Per Olaf Lundteigen | 10 May 1999 – | Centre |
| Ministry of Local Government and Regional Development | Olav Ulleren | 10 May 1999 – | Centre |
| Ministry of Social Affairs and Health | Idar Magne Holme | 23 October 1997 – | Christian Democratic |
| Ministry of Social Affairs and Health | Rita H. Roaldsen | 23 October 1997 – 29 January 1999 | Centre |
| Ministry of Social Affairs and Health | Steinulf Tungesvik | 29 January 1999 – | Centre |
| Ministry of Culture | Ivar Egeberg | – 17 July 1998 | Centre |
| Ministry of Culture | Per Kristian Skulberg | 17 July 1998 – | Centre |
| Ministry of Transport and Communications | Torild Skogsholm | – 15 March 1999 | Liberal |
| Ministry of Transport and Communications | Svein Ottar Sandal | 15 March 1999 – | Christian Democratic |
| Ministry of Fisheries | Johannes Martin Nakken | 23 October 1997 – 3 November 1999 | Centre |
| Ministry of Fisheries | Terje Lorentz Magnussen | 3 November 1999 – 21 January 2000 | Centre |
| Ministry of Fisheries | Kenneth Mikkelsen | 4 February 2000 – | Centre |
| Ministry of the Environment | Jesper Werdelin Simonsen | 23 October 1997 – | Liberal |
| Ministry of Agriculture | Jan Erik Sundby | 24 October 1997 – | Christian Democratic |
| Ministry of Justice and Police | Bjørn Johan Solbakken | 28 November 1997 – | Christian Democratic |
| Ministry of Justice and Police | Åshild Anmarkrud | 27 October 1997 – 15 March 1999 | Christian Democratic |
| Ministry of Justice and Police | Atle Hamar | 15 March 1999 – | Liberal |
| Ministry of Children and Family Affairs | Odd Anders With | 27 October 1997 – 23 August 1999 | Christian Democratic |
| Ministry of Children and Family Affairs | Torunn Laupsa | 23 August 1999 – | Christian Democratic |
| Ministry of Petroleum and Energy | Håkon Giil | – 29 January 1999 | Centre |
| Ministry of Petroleum and Energy | Erlend Grimstad | 29 January 1999 – | Centre |
| Ministry of Church Affairs, Education and Research | Svein Helgesen | | Christian Democratic |
| Ministry of Church Affairs, Education and Research | Marit Elisebet Totland | 23 October 1997 – | Christian Democratic |

| Preceded by Premiership of Thorbjørn Jagland | Norwegian Council of State; 1997–2000 | Succeeded by Jens Stoltenberg's first term as Prime Minister of Norway |
