= Cathrin Bretzeg =

Norwegian politician

Cathrin Bretzeg (born 17 February 1965) is a Norwegian politician for the Conservative Party.

In 2004, while the second cabinet Bondevik held office, she was appointed State Secretary in the Ministry of Local Government and Regional Development. She lost this job when the cabinet fell following the 2005 election. She served as a deputy representative to the Norwegian Parliament from Akershus during the term 2005–2009.
