= Erling Danielsen =

Norwegian politician (1922–2010)

Erling Danielsen (10 June 1922 – 15 March 2010) was a Norwegian politician for the Christian Democratic Party.

From 1957 to 1959 he was the chairman of the Youth of the Christian People's Party, the youth wing of the Christian Democratic Party.

He served as a deputy representative to the Parliament of Norway from Østfold during the terms 1965–1969 and 1969–1973. In total he met during 2 days of parliamentary session.

Party political offices
Preceded by Odd Steinar Holøs	Chairman of the Youth of the Christian People's Party; 1957–1959	Succeeded by Daniel Kristiansen
