= Anna Kristine Jahr Røine =

Norwegian politician (born 1949)

Anna Kristine Jahr Røine (born 27 December 1949) is a Norwegian politician for the Centre Party.

She served as a deputy representative to the Norwegian Parliament from Akershus during the term 1977–1981.

From 1999 to 2000, during the first cabinet Bondevik, Jahr Røine was appointed state secretary in the Office of the Prime Minister.
