= Oluf Ulseth =

Norwegian politician

Oslo City Commissioner of Health
- Incumbent
- Assumed office 19 June 2026
- Governing Mayor: Eirik Lae Solberg
- Preceded by: Saliba Andreas Korkunc

Personal details
- Born: 1966 (age 59–60)
- Party: Conservative
- Education: Norwegian School of Economics
- Occupation: Businessperson

Oluf Ulseth (born 1966) is a Norwegian businessperson and politician for the Conservative Party.

Ulseth graduated from the Norwegian School of Economics with a siv.øk. degree. He started his political career as an adviser to the Conservative Party parliamentary group from 1992 to 1995, and also worked in Storebrand.

As Bondevik's Second Cabinet assumed office in 2001, Ulseth was appointed as a State Secretary in the Ministry of Trade and Industry. In June 2004 he changed to the Ministry of Petroleum and Energy, serving until October 2005 when Bondevik's Second Cabinet fell.

In 2006 he became the new director of the European market in Statkraft. From 2011 to 2018 he was the chief executive officer of Energi Norge, the employers' association for the energy industry. In January 2019, during the Solberg's Cabinet, he returned as a State Secretary, this time in the Office of the Prime Minister. He again served until the cabinet was removed from office, in October 2021.

On 19 June 2026, Ulseth was appointed Oslo City Commissioner for Health, succeeding Saliba Andreas Korkunc who had resigned to become an advisor for the party's parliamentary group. In October, he additionally became acting commissioner for urban development following the resignation of Anita Leirvik North. Christina Solli Ektvedt was appointed his permanent successor on 10 November.
