= Centre for Advanced Study at the Norwegian Academy of Science and Letters =

Norwegian research centre

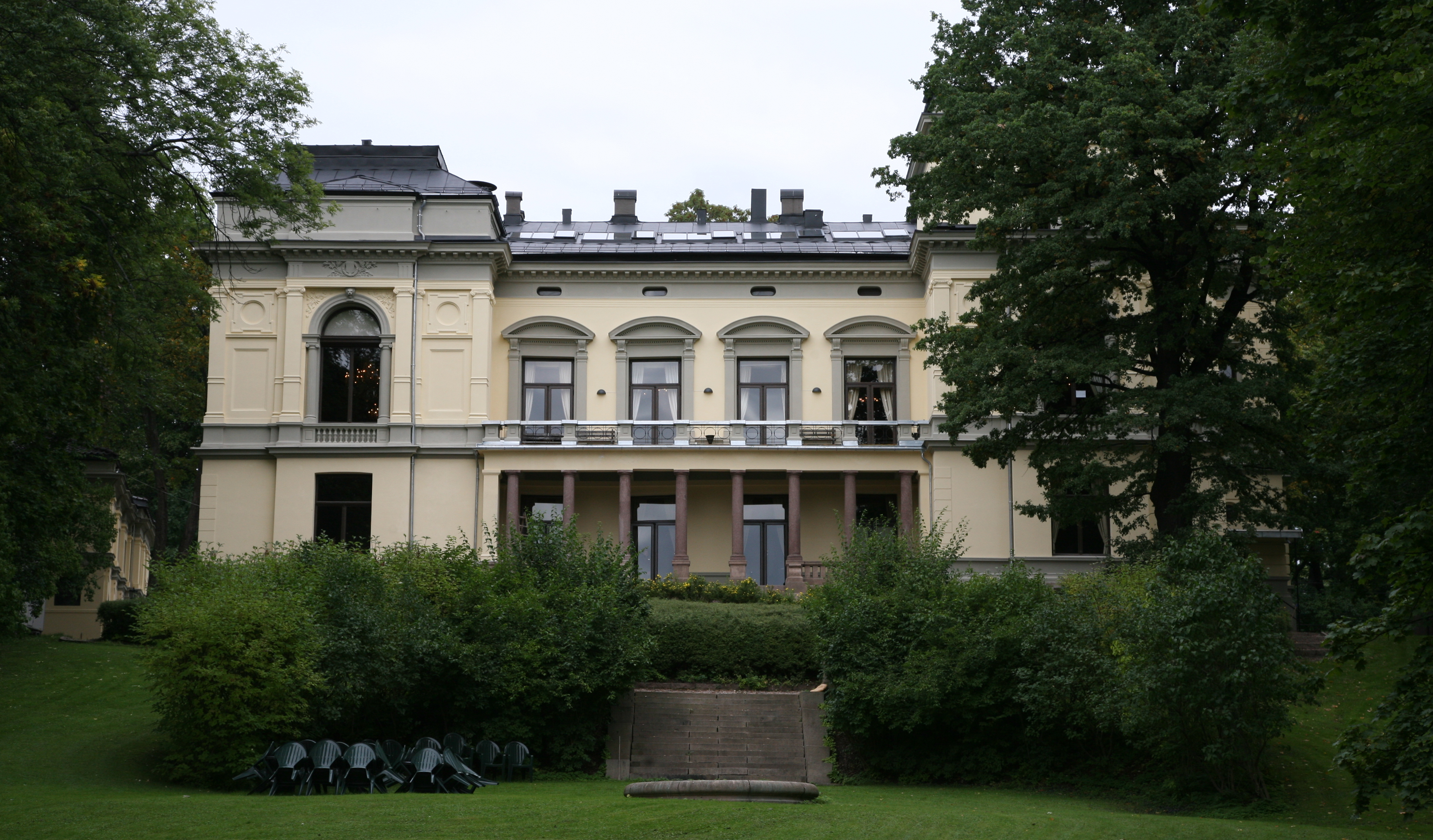
Centre for Advanced Study (Senter for grunnforskning) at Drammensveien 78, Oslo

The Centre for Advanced Study at the Norwegian Academy of Science and Letters (CAS; Norwegian: Senter for grunnforskning ved Det Norske Videnskaps-Akademi) is an independent research foundation funded by the Norwegian Ministry of Education and Research. CAS is located in Oslo, Norway.

== Activities ==
The Centre is an independent research foundation funded by the Norwegian Ministry of Education and Research. Since its opening in 1992, CAS has hosted more than 100 research projects and 1,300 scholars. The goal is to provide scholars with an intellectually stimulating experience in an international, interdisciplinary research environment during their stay in Oslo.

The day-to-day operations of CAS are managed by a scientific director and an administrative team of five permanent staff members.

=== CAS Grants ===
The primary activities of the Centre are designed to support excellent blue skies research.

CAS funds projects within and across the fields of the humanities, social sciences and natural sciences. The Centre supports established scholars through the CAS Research Grant and early career scholars through the Young CAS Grant.

The CAS Research Grant is the Centre’s funding opportunity for established researchers. Recipients of a CAS Research Grant can invite scholars from all around the world, at any stage of their academic career, to participate in their project. Each year, the board selects three research projects within the fields of:

- Humanities / Theology
- Social sciences / Law
- Natural sciences / Medicine / Mathematics

The Young CAS Grant is the Centre’s funding opportunity for early career scholars below the age of 40. Recipients of a Young CAS Grant receive funding and support for their research project and gain valuable experience from organizing multiple workshops and a two-month research stay at CAS.

The Young CAS Grant programme is a collaboration between CAS, the Young Academy of Norway (AYF) and The Norwegian Academy of Science and Letters (DNVA).

CAS believes that research is most successful when conducted in international teams. Therefore, the Centre provides funding for research groups working together on a common project, instead of supporting individual researchers. The projects are initiated and led by applicants from Norwegian partner institutions.

== Partner institutions and networks ==
CAS partners with nearly all universities and several university colleges in Norway. Agreements between CAS and its partner institutions ensure that the year spent at CAS is counted as an extra sabbatical year for scholars connected to the partner institutions.

CAS' partner institutions are:

- BI Norwegian Business School
- MF Norwegian School of Theology
- Norwegian Institute of International Affairs
- Norwegian School of Economics (NHH)
- Norwegian University of Life Sciences
- Norwegian University of Science and Technology
- University of Agder
- University of Bergen
- University of Oslo
- University of Stavanger
- UiT The Arctic University of Tromsø
- Center for International Climate and Environmental Research Oslo (CICERO)
- Oslo Metropolitan University (OsloMet)
- Peace Research Institute Oslo (PRIO)
- Inland Norway University of Applied Sciences (HINN)

In addition to these partner institutions, CAS collaborates with other institutions in both Norway and abroad:

- Norwegian Academy of Science and Letters (DNVA) – While not a part of DNVA, CAS shares a common history and enjoys a strong bond with the organisation. CAS was founded by the Academy in 1989, and is located in the basement and on the third floor of the Academy building. DNVA selects six of the members/alternates of the CAS Board of Directors and appoints the Chairperson. The Secretary General of the Academy participates as an observer during board meetings. DNVA also supports the Young CAS programme by providing venues and catering for the gatherings.
- The Young Academy of Norway (AYF) – The Young Academy of Norway is a central collaborator and participates in the election of the Young CAS candidates and offers carrier advice to the Young CAS PIs.
- Network of European Institutes for Advanced Study (NetIAS) – CAS is member of the Network of European Institutes for Advanced Study (NetIAS). NetIAS was established in 2004 to enhance dialogue on practices and enable cooperation between institutes. Today, it comprises 25 institutions for advanced study across Europe, and the network hosts more than 500 researchers every year for up to one full academic year.

== History ==
CAS is located in the Norwegian Academy of Science and Letters building, formerly known as Statsråd Astrup's Villa, at Drammensveien 78 in Oslo.

The idea of an elite research center in Norway was launched by Gudmund Hernes in a 1986 op-ed in Dagbladet, where he argued that Norway needed a research center inspired by et al. The Institute for Advanced Study in Princeton.

In 1989, Senter for høyere studier (SHS) was established as a foundation and the new institution was officially opened on September 1, 1992. Gudmund Hernes served as the Centre's chairman from its establishment in 1989 until he became a cabinet minister in the Ministry of Church, Education, and Research in Gro Harlem Brundtland's Third Cabinet.

In 2002, the Centre changed its Norwegian name to Senter for grunforskning ved Det Norske Videnskaps-Akademi (lit. 'Centre for Basic Research at the Norwegian Academy of Science and Letters'). The English name has always been Centre for Advanced Study at the Norwegian Academy of Science and Letters.

The idea of elite research has since been continued with the establishment of several Centers for Excellence in Research by the Research Council of Norway. The CAS differs from these centers, among other things, by being a national center, with cooperation agreements with all the major Norwegian universities as well as some scientific colleges.

=== Chair of the CAS Board of Directors ===
- Professor Gudmund Hernes (1989–90)
- Professor Dagfinn Føllesdal (1991)
- Professor Vigdis Ystad (1992–93)
- Professor Torstein Jøssang (1993–99)
- Professor Aanund Hylland (2000–10)
- Professor Asbjørn Kjønstad (2011–14)
- Professor Geir Ellingsrud (2014–18)
- Professor Rolf K. Reed (2018-)

=== Scientific Directors ===
- Professor Ole-Jørgen Skog (1999-03)
- Professor Willy Østreng (2003–09)
- Professor Gro Steinsland (2009–12)
- Professor Brit Solli (2012–14)
- Professor Vigdis Broch-Due (2015–18)
- Professor Camilla Serck-Hanssen (2018-)
