= Geir Hønneland =

Norwegian political scientist

Geir Hønneland (born 1966 in Mandal, Norway) is a Norwegian political scientist, former Director of the Fridtjof Nansen Institute (FNI) and professor II at the University of Tromsø and Nord University.

Hønneland took his doctoral degree at the University of Oslo in 2000, with the PhD dissertation Compliance in the Barents Sea Fisheries. He was given full professor competence in 2004, and has worked as a visiting scholar at several universities, including Rutgers (the State University of New Jersey) (2002–2003), Aalborg University (2010) and the Royal Danish Defence Academy (2013).

Hønneland has worked and published extensively on issues related to international ocean governance, East-West relations in the Arctic, Russian politics, and the role of identity in international relations. He has been ranked the most publishing scientist the Norwegian institute sector (48 institutes) from 2012 to 2016, and he also ranks high on the list of Norway's most published scientists across all disciplines. Several of Hønneland's books have appeared in new editions and translations, including to Chinese and Russian. Among his most important books are Borderland Russians (Palgrave, 2010), Making Fishery Agreements Work (Edward Elgar, 2012), Russia and the Arctic (I.B.Tauris, 2016), Arctic Euphoria (Palgrave, 2017) og International Politics in the Arctic (I.B.Tauris, 2017).

Hønneland has held various positions in the Research Council of Norway, among them as head of the working group for ocean management under the Norwegian Government's Hav21 (‘Oceans 21’) strategy process, and as member of the Programme Board of the Polar Research Programme.
