= National Round Table on the Environment and the Economy =

The National Round Table on the Environment and the Economy (NRTEE) was a Canadian advisory program created in response to the 1987 United Nations document Our Common Future by the Progressive Conservative Party of Canada. The NRTEE focused on sustaining Canada's prosperity without stealing resources from future generations or compromising their ability to live securely. The Conservative government of Stephen Harper ended funding to NRTEE, which ceased to exist on 31 March 2013.

== Overview ==
The National Round Table was an independent policy advisory body to the Government of Canada. Its mandate was to raise awareness among Canadians and their governments about the challenges of sustainable development.

Over its 25 year history, the NRTEE released dozens of reports on priority issues: forests, brownfield lands, infrastructure, energy, water, air, climate change, and more. It offered advice to governments on how best to reconcile and integrate the often divergent challenges of economic prosperity and environmental conservation.

It brought together hundreds of leaders and experts with first-hand knowledge in many disciplines. Its members, appointed by the federal government, were active in businesses, universities, environmentalism, labour, public policy, and community life from across Canada.

== Disbanding ==
On 31 March 2013, the Conservative government of Stephen Harper eliminated the budget for the NRTEE, effectively ending it. Environment Minister Peter Kent initially offered the rationale that the funding was unnecessary, because Canadians could by that time access climate change research through the internet, universities, and think tanks. In response to a question in the House of Commons, then-Foreign Affairs Minister John Baird said that the government should not be funding the roundtable because it had issued a series of reports advocating a form of carbon pricing, which he said "the people of Canada have repeatedly rejected ... It should agree with Canadians. It should agree with the government." The roundtable had released several reports that had concluded that the federal government would have to act more aggressively if it were to reach its Kyoto Protocol target of a 17% reduction in greenhouse gas emissions from 2005 levels by 2020.

On 26 March 2013, Kent issued a directive preventing the roundtable from transferring its research and the contents of its website to Sustainable Prosperity, a national research network based at the University of Ottawa. Instead, he said that Environment Canada would lay claim to all previous work, which Kent promised would remain accessible to the public. The move appeared to leave the fate of two unpublished documents on the history, role, and relationship of the roundtable to the government uncertain. One of these, entitled Reflections from Past Leaders of the NRTEE, was subsequently leaked and posted to the internet.

== Publications ==
- See Scribd- National Round Table for 104 available publications.
- "Canada's Opportunity: Adopting Life Cycle Approaches for Sustainable Development."
