= Helge Ole Bergesen =

Norwegian politician (1949–2015)

State Secretary in the Ministry of Education and Research
- In office 2001–2005
- Monarch: Harald V
- Prime Minister: Kjell Magne Bondevik
- Minister: Kristin Clemet

Personal details
- Born: 29 September 1949 Stavanger, Rogaland, Norway
- Died: 29 June 2015 (aged 65)
- Party: Conservative Party
- Occupation: Political scientist, politician

Helge Ole Bergesen (29 September 1949 – 29 June 2015) was a Norwegian political scientist and politician for the Conservative Party.

He was born in Stavanger as the grandson of Ole Bergesen, obtained the mag.art. degree (PhD equivalent) in political science. In 1980 he was hired as a researcher at the Fridtjof Nansen Institute. His publications include Norge mellom rik og fattig (1981), Fiendskap og fellesskap: internasjonal politikk i forandring (1991, with W. Østreng), Norge i det globale drivhuset (1995, with K. Roland and A. K. Sydnes), Dinosaurs or Dynamos? The United Nations and the World Bank at the Turn of the Century (1999, with Leiv Lund). Since 1992 he is also a co-editor of the Green Globe Yearbook.

Bergesen started his political career in the Norwegian Young Conservatives, and was deputy chairman there from 1969 to 1973. During this period he was also a member of the central committee of the Conservative Party. He was elected to serve in Stavanger city council in 1995, chaired the local chapter from 1997 to 2000 and became a member of the central committee for the second time in 2000. From 2001 to 2005, while the second cabinet Bondevik held office, Bergesen was a State Secretary in the Ministry of Education and Research.

He died of cancer on 29 June 2015.
