= Øyvind Håbrekke =

Norwegian politician (born 1969)

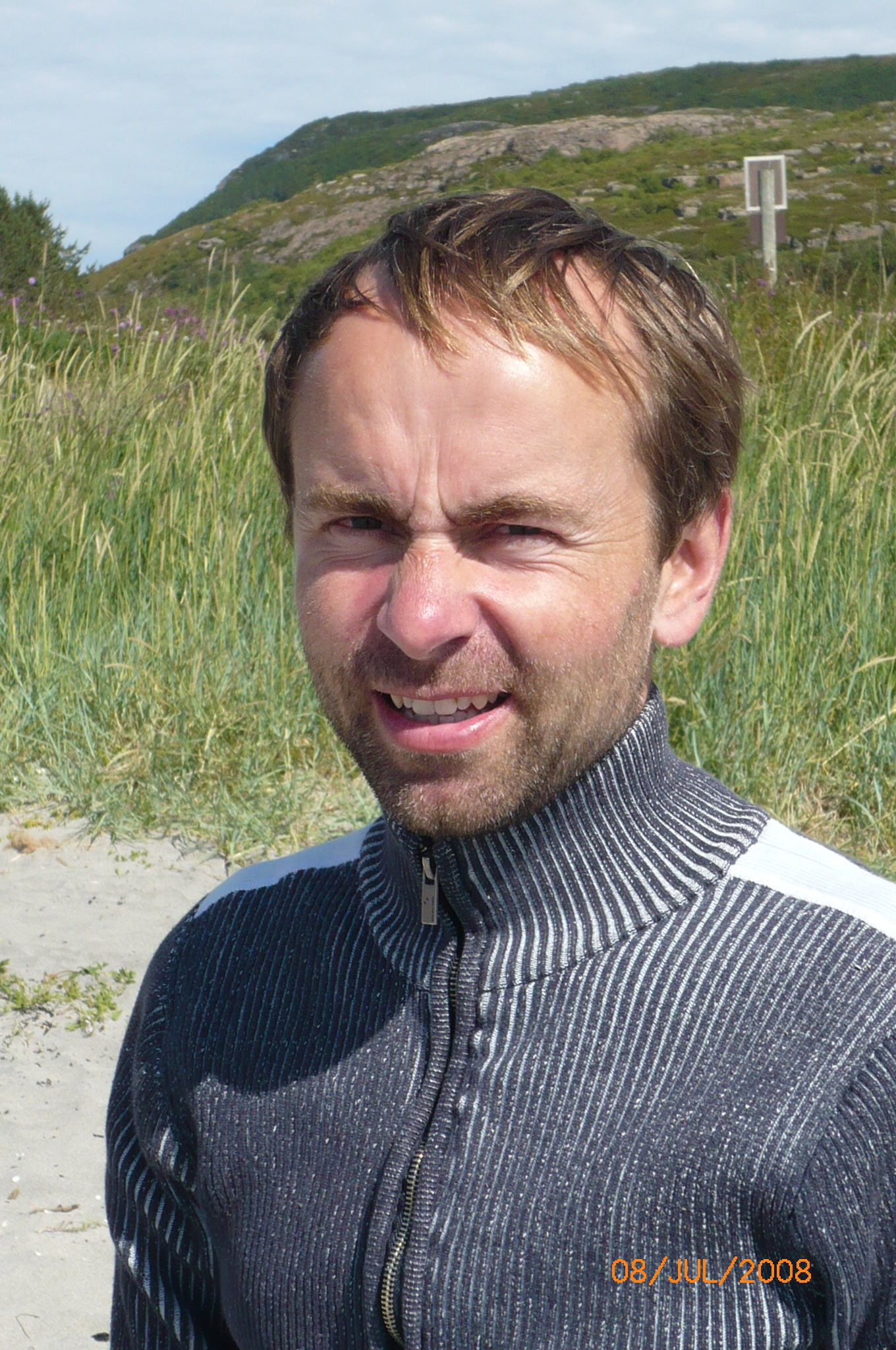
Øyvind Håbrekke

Øyvind Håbrekke (born 20 December 1969) is a Norwegian politician for the Christian Democratic Party.

From 1996 to 1999 he was the chairman of the Youth of the Christian People's Party, the youth wing of the Christian Democratic Party.

He served as a deputy representative to the Norwegian Parliament from Sør-Trøndelag during the terms 1997–2001, 2001–2005 and 2005–2009.

During the second cabinet Bondevik, Håbrekke was appointed political advisor in the Ministry of Petroleum and Energy from 2001 to January 2004, before becoming a State Secretary in the same Ministry until June 2004. He was then appointed State Secretary in the Ministry of the Environment.

Håbrekke became a member of the Parliament of Norway in 2009, representing his home county Sør-Trøndelag. He is serving as second deputy chair of the Standing Committee on Family and Cultural Affairs.

From 2014–2017 Håbrekke was head of communications in KA - Norwegian Association for Church Employers.

Since 2017 he has been the research director in the think tank Skaperkraft.

In 2018, Håbrekke came out with the debate book "Den liberale familien – Biologiens comeback?" ("The Liberal Family - Biology's Comeback?"), which discusses the principles of paternity and motherhood in the Children's Act in light of new family patterns and assisted fertilization.

Party political offices
| Preceded by Andreas E. Eidsaa | Chairman of the Youth of the Christian People's Party; 1996–1999 | Succeeded by David Hansen |
