= Per Steinar Osmundnes =

Norwegian politician

Per Steinar Osmundnes (born 20 August 1980) is a Norwegian politician for the Christian Democratic Party.

From 2002 to 2005 he was the leader of the Youth of the Christian People's Party, the youth wing of the Christian Democratic Party.

He served as a deputy representative to the Norwegian Parliament from Sogn og Fjordane during the term 2001–2005. From June 2003 he met as a regular representative, replacing Magne Aarøen who had died.

Party political offices
Preceded by David Hansen	Leader of the Youth of the Christian People's Party; 2002–2005	Succeeded by Inger Lise Hansen
