= Odd Steinar Holøs =

Norwegian politician

Odd Steinar Holøs (8 April 1922 – 31 August 2001) was a Norwegian politician for the Christian Democratic Party.

He was born in Rakkestad.

From 1956 to 1957 he was the chairman of the Youth of the Christian People's Party, the youth wing of the Christian Democratic Party.

He was elected to the Norwegian Parliament from Østfold in 1981, and was re-elected on one occasion. He had previously served in the position of deputy representative during the terms 1958–1961, 1961–1965, 1965–1969, 1969–1973, 1973–1977 and 1977–1981. He met as a regular representative in 1972 and 1973 meanwhile Lars Korvald was Prime Minister. In 1963, during the short-lived cabinet Lyng, he was appointed State Secretary in the Ministry of Social Affairs.

On the local level, Holøs served as deputy mayor of Rakkestad municipality from 1955 to 1967, and was a member of its executive committee during the term 1979–1983.

Holøs did not have higher education. Outside politics he worked in newspapers among other things, as the editor-in-chief of Østfold Bygdeblad from 1945 to 1947 and 1957 to 1964 and a journalist in Vårt Land from 1946 to 1950.

Party political offices
Preceded by Kåre Kristiansen	Chairman of the Youth of the Christian People's Party; 1956–1957	Succeeded by Erling Danielsen
