= Inger Lise Hansen =

Norwegian politician

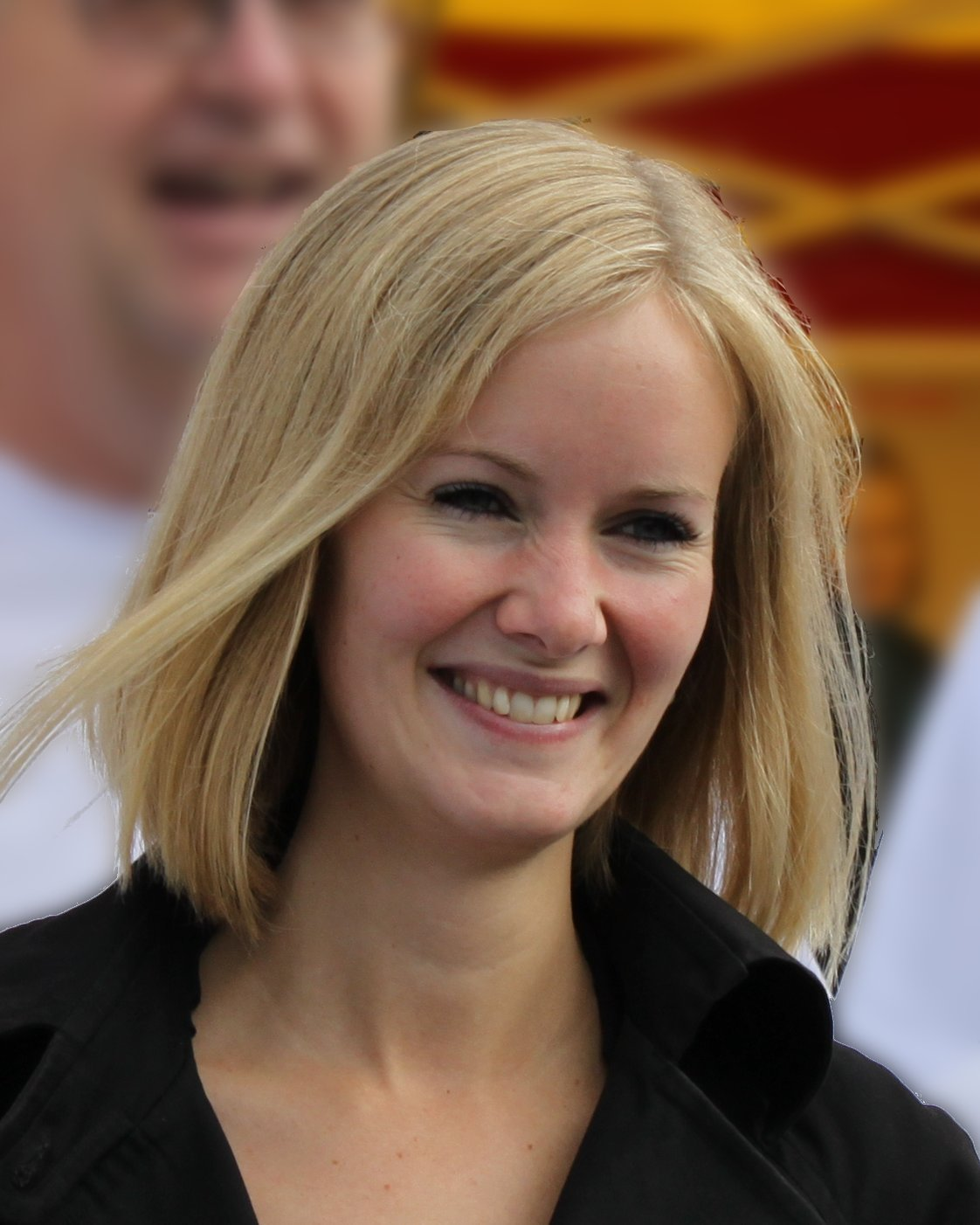

Leader of the Youth of the Christian People's Party
- In office 19 June 2005 – 25 June 2007
- Deputy: Kjell Ingolf Ropstad
- Preceded by: Per Steinar Osmundnes
- Succeeded by: Kjell Ingolf Ropstad

Personal details
- Born: 1 September 1981 (age 45) Åsgårdstrand, Norway
- Party: Christian Democratic
- Education: University of Oslo
- Occupation: Politician

Inger Lise Hansen (born 1 September 1981) is a Norwegian politician and a member of the centre-right Christian Democratic Party (KRF). A former leader of the Youth of the Christian People's Party (KRFU) from 2005 to 2007, Hansen was the second Deputy Leader of the party until 2011.

== Early and personal life ==
Hansen was born in Åsgårdstrand in Vestfold county, Norway, but later relocated to the capital of Oslo to pursue an education and career. A graduate of the University of Oslo, Hansen obtains a Bachelor of Arts in international studies concerning religious and cultural history. She is married to David Hansen, a fellow member of the Christian Democratic Party, with whom she has one child.

== Political career ==
Hansen's political career began in the Youth of the Christian People's Party (KRFU), the youth wing of the much greater Christian Democratic Party (KRF). After her future husband stepped down as leader of the KRFU in 2002, Hansen was elected deputy representative to the Parliament of Norway from the Vestfold constituency, and served from 2001 to 2005. A young and active member at the time, she was promoted to leader of the party's youth wing, the KRFU, with her predecessor Per Steinar Osmundnes being elected to Parliament later that year. In 2007, Hansen was appointed to second Deputy Leader by Chairman Dagfinn Høybråten, and was coined as one of the rising stars within the Christian Democratic Party. She was re-elected to that position at the party congress in early 2009. Later that same year, Hansen competed in the Vestfold constituency during Norwegian parliamentary election for a seat in Parliament, but due to strong competition from the Norwegian Labour Party and the Progress Party, Hansen was not elected. However, she continues to serve as second Deputy Leader of the KRF.

=== Remarks concerning party policies ===
In January 2010, Hansen became the subject of much media attention, criticism, praise and controversy when she called for a strong liberalization in the party's policies. In an interview for the national newspaper Aftenposten, Hansen argued that KRF's "unquestionable support" towards Israel and their actions in the Middle East should change rapidly. As such she condemned the construction of the Israeli West Bank barrier alongside the city of Jerusalem, criticised plans to move the Norwegian Embassy in Israel to the occupied territories that belong to the Palestinians and questioned if Norway should cut off financial support if an agreement between the two nations is not reached. Hansen also criticised the conservative direction of the party, and claimed that they should support LGBT rights, same-sex marriage and Norway to enter the European Union. She also optioned for a more liberal attitude towards alcohol and that members of the party should not all be Christian fundamentalists.

Hansen's remarks were later published by other newspapers as a direct criticism of Christian Democratic Party leader Dagfinn Høybråten and the rest of the conservative leadership, whom she blamed for the recent election polls that seem to be the worst in the party's history since World War II. The incident was described as "shocking" and "astonishing" by the media and was even coined as a possible downfall for the Christian Democratic Party. In the aftermath, Hansen was met with strong criticism from the party leadership, while some political commentators believed she had destroyed her career. However, the controversy was well received by many as well, with Hansen being recognized as a leading member of the liberal wing that could shape a new and modern Christian Democratic Party. This led to a formal invitation from members of the Conservative Party to join them as well, which Hansen chose not to comment on. Overall, the incident boosted Hansen's popularity amongst the population, but also weakened her relations with the party leadership after the party itself fell below the 4% election threshold.

== Political views ==
=== Christianity and LGBT rights ===
Inger Lise Hansen's political views are built on Christian democratic and Christian conservative values. However, she has called for a new era in the party's social policies, especially regarding LGBT rights. Hansen supports gay couples to live together and favors same-sex marriages and gay adoption rights. Hansen has further criticised the party leadership's status on these issues, and as such she has been recognised as a leading member of the party's more liberal and modern wing.

=== Abortion ===
Hansen does not favor euthanasia or abortion unless in cases of rape or if the mother's life is at risk. This is a central policy in the ideology of the Christian Democratic Party (KRF), and as such Hansen has identified herself as Pro-life.

=== Norway and the European Union ===
Hansen supports Norwegian membership in the European Union, despite the fact that the Christian Democratic Party officially opposes it. Hansen, however, feels that the subject has never been properly discussed within the party, and as such is open for Norway to obtain membership due to the fact that Norway will benefit from the international relationship both financially and in accordance with peace and stability. She is also convinced that another referendum must take place though in order to fully close the chapter and decide on the controversial political issue.

=== Israel ===
In contradiction to the Christian Democratic Party's policies, Hansen has opted for a more negative attitude towards the State of Israel such as condemning the construction of the Israeli West Bank barrier. She has also criticised plans to move the Norwegian Embassy to these occupied territories where Palestinians reside, and has suggested that Norway should cut off financial support to Israel unless a peace agreement is reached with the Palestinians.
