= Andreas E. Eidsaa =

Norwegian politician

Andreas Endre Eidsaa Jr. (born 17 November 1970) is a Norwegian politician for the Christian Democratic Party.

From 1993 to 1996 he served as the chairman of the Youth of the Christian People's Party, the youth wing of the Christian Democratic Party.

He served as a deputy representative to the Norwegian Parliament from Rogaland during the term 1993–1997.

Party political offices
Preceded by Anders Gåsland	Chairman of the Youth of the Christian People's Party; 1993–1996	Succeeded by Øyvind Håbrekke
