= Solveig Strand =

Norwegian politician

Solveig Strand (born 1961) is a Norwegian businessperson in shipping and fisheries, and politician for the Conservative Party.

Strand is a manager and owner of fishing vessels and companies within fisheries and investment. In 2021, she had the highest income among Norwegian female businesspeople within fisheries.

When Bondevik's Second Cabinet assumed office in October 2001, Strand was named as the State Secretary for the Conservative Party's Minister of Fisheries Svein Ludvigsen. She left the position in June 2002, following a case where the fish trawler Havbris was caught for irregular reporting of their fishing yields. Strand was a co-owner of this trawler, albeit a passive owner at the time.

In 2007 she became the first female board member in Norges Fiskarlag. In 2015 she became a board member of the Norwegian Seafood Council. She was also a board member of Marine Harvest and BN Bank.
