= Per N. Hagen =

Norwegian politician

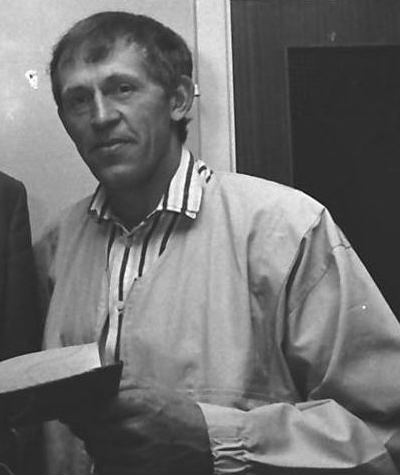
Per N. Hagen (cropped)

Per N. Hagen (12 June 1936 – 9 January 2010) was a Norwegian politician for the Centre Party.

He served as a deputy representative to the Parliament of Norway from Hedmark during the term 1977–1981. On the local level he was the mayor of Tynset Municipality from 1972 to 1987, and a member of Hedmark county council. He was a State Secretary in the Ministry of Local Government from 1989 to 1990, in Syse's Cabinet, and from 1997 to 1999 in Bondevik's First Cabinet. In between he chaired the Norwegian Parliamentary Intelligence Oversight Committee from 1996 to 1997.

Hagen was also a board member of Østlendingen, and held positions in Kommunalbanken and the Industrial Development Corporation of Norway (SIVA). He died in January 2010 following long-term illness.
