= Ivar Molde =

Norwegian politician

Ivar Molde (29 September 1949 – 6 February 2024) born in Voss was a Norwegian politician for the Christian Democratic Party.

From 1973 to 1975 he was the chairman of the Youth of the Christian People's Party, the youth wing of the Christian Democratic Party. He took over the post from Kjell Magne Bondevik, who later became prime minister.

Molde later served as a deputy representative to the Norwegian Parliament from Hordaland during the term 1993–1997.

His profession was a priest until his retirement in 2016. He was editor of Stille Stunder from 2004 to his death in 2024.

Party political offices
| Preceded by Kjell Magne Bondevik | Chairman of the Youth of the Christian People's Party; 1973–1975 | Succeeded by Ola T. Lånke |
