= Tone Skogen =

Norwegian civil servant and politician

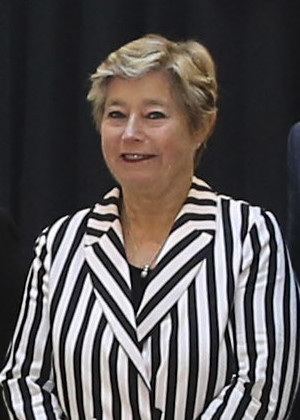
Tone Skogen in 2019

Tone Skogen (born 12 September 1953) is a Norwegian civil servant and politician for the Conservative Party.

She served as a member of Akershus county council for sixteen years, and was a State Secretary under Børge Brende in the Ministry of Trade and Industry between 2004 and 2005, as a part of Bondevik's Second Cabinet. She works as a head of department in the Ministry of Petroleum and Energy, and has been a board member of Ruter, Vinmonopolet and Oslo University Hospital. She grew up at Østerås and resides at Fossum.

In Solberg's Cabinet, she once again returned as a State Secretary. She served under Børge Brende in the Ministry of Foreign Affairs from 2015. When Ine Eriksen Søreide became Minister of Foreign Affairs in October 2017, Skogen remained for one month until November 2017, when she transferred to the Ministry of Defence. She remained here until Solberg's Cabinet fell in October 2021.
