= Helge Eide (politician) =

Norwegian politician (born 1964)

Helge Eide (born 15 December 1964 in Arna Municipality, Norway) is a Norwegian politician for the Christian Democratic Party.

Eide graduated with the siv.øk. degree from the Norwegian School of Economics in Bergen, and was elected to Bergen city council in 1988. In 1995 he was elected to the municipal council of Skedsmo Municipality. He was a State Secretary in the Ministry of Labour and Government Administration in 1999 and the Ministry of Finance during the Bondevik's First Cabinet. He was a State Secretary in the Ministry of Labour and Social Affairs from 2004 to 2005 during the Bondevik's Second Cabinet. From 2007 to 2009 he was deputy mayor of Skedsmo Municipality, and a senior adviser to the Christian Democratic Party parliamentary group. In 2010 he was hired as the director of interest politics in the Norwegian Association of Local and Regional Authorities.
