= Harald Solberg =

Norwegian politician

Harald Solberg' (born 20 July 1976) is a Norwegian politician for the Christian Democratic Party.

He served as a deputy representative to the Norwegian Parliament from Vestfold during the terms 1997–2001 and 2001–2005.

From 2001 to 2003, during the second cabinet Bondevik, Solberg was appointed political advisor in the Office of the Prime Minister. In 2003 he was appointed State Secretary of the Ministry of Finance. He lost the job when the second cabinet Bondevik fell in 2005.
