= Arne Synnes =

Norwegian politician

Arne Synnes (born 31 May 1940) is a Norwegian politician for the Christian Democratic Party.

He took the cand.real. degree in theoretical physics at the University of Oslo, and worked five years as a secondary school teacher in Røros Municipality. Here, he was nominated and elected to the municipal council of Røros Municipality representing the Christian Democratic Party. Later moving to Høvik, he has been a member of municipal council of Bærum Municipality and Akershus county council. He is married and has four children.

He worked for two years in the Ministry of Education and Research, then for five years in Det Norske Veritas. In 1976 he was hired as secretariat leader for the Christian Democratic Party in the Parliament of Norway. He was a State Secretary in the Ministry of Trade and Shipping from 1983 to 1986 in Willoch's Second Cabinet, and in the Ministry of Finance from 1997 to 1999 in Bondevik's First Cabinet. In total he was the Christian Democratic Party's secretariat leader for eighteen years. He was an embassy counsellor in Latvia from 2004 to his retirement.
