= Fridtjof Nansen Institute =

Norwegian research institute

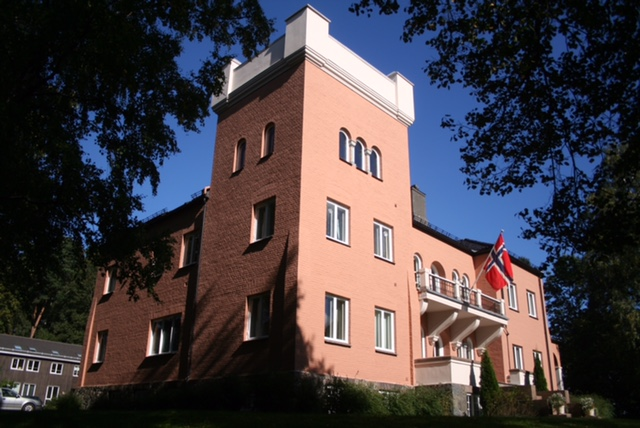
The Fridtjof Nansen Institute building

The Fridtjof Nansen Institute (FNI) is an independent research foundation specializing in research on international environmental, energy and resource management issues, including political and legal aspects.

The institute is named after the Norwegian Arctic explorer, scientist, diplomat and Nobel Peace Prize laureate Fridtjof Nansen. It is situated in Nansen's old mansion, Polhøgda, in Bærum municipality outside Oslo.

== Organisation ==
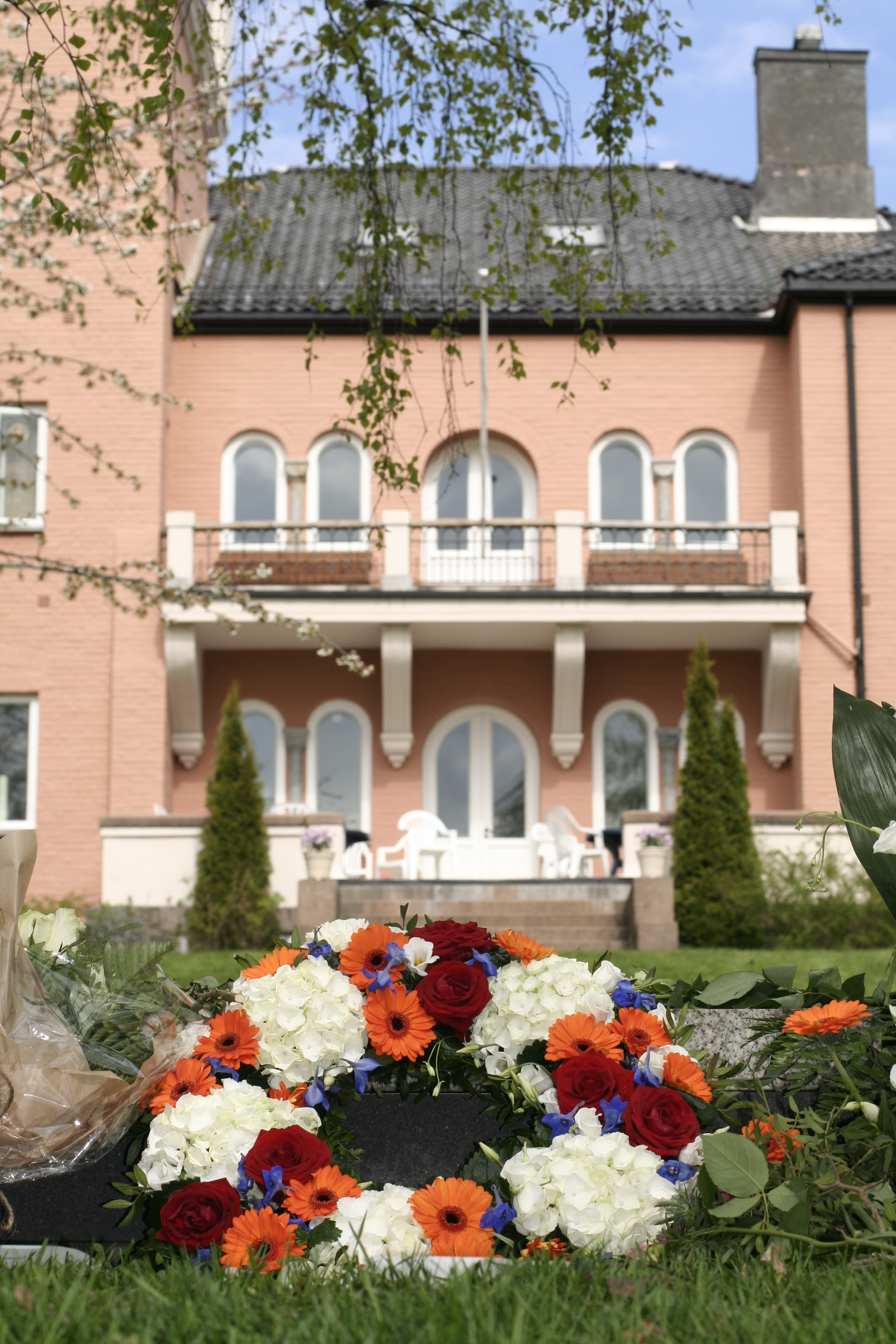
Fridtjof Nansen's grave is situated in the gardens at the Polhøgda estate

The Fridtjof Nansen Institute has 30-40 scholarly employees. Most of them come from the fields of political science and law, but historians, economists and anthropologists are also represented among the research staff. Iver B. Neumann has served as FNI Director since December 2019.

== Main focus ==
FNI activities include academic studies as well as contract work for research, investigations and evaluations. Current FNI research has seven focal points:

- Global environmental governance and law
- Climate change
- Law of the Sea and marine affairs
- Biodiversity and genetic resources
- Polar and Russian politics
- European energy and environment
- Chinese energy and environment

== History ==
The institute was established in 1958, under the name of 'the Fridtjof Nansen Foundation'. This foundation was set up to take care of the buildings and grounds at Polhøgda, where Nansen lived and worked until his death in 1930, and to ensure that Polhøgda would be used to uphold the legacy and promote the focal points of Nansen's life and activities.

In line with Nansen's own scientific interests, the institute began by focusing mainly on polar/marine issues as well as the law of the sea. Over the years, FNI has gradually broadened its scope, in terms of academic disciplines, geographical spread and thematic issues.

== Recent accomplishments ==
In recent years, FNI has gained considerable scientific recognition, especially for its research work connected to the Anthropocene, the Arctic and Antarctic regions, climate change and climate policy, the law of the sea, and the management of bio-diversity and genetic resources. FNI is ranked as Norway's most productive (most actively publishing) independent research institute – a position it has been accorded every year since 2013.

In 2017 FNI was named 'best European think tank on energy and environment' by Prospect Magazine in its annual Think Tank Awards. This was the first time a Norwegian research institute was awarded the prestigious prize, which is presented to 'give credit to the most original and rigorous work on the most pressing challenges facing people, governments and businesses today', according to the organizers. The institute has since been awarded the prize also in 2018 and in 2019. Previous winners of the Think Tank Awards include such renowned establishments as the Brookings Institution, the RAND Corporation and the Centre for European Policy Studies (CEPS).

== Directors ==
Several highly acclaimed scholars have been associated with and held leading positions at FNI, including social scientist Stein Rokkan, philosopher Arne Næss as well as sociologist and peace and conflict researcher Johan Galtung.

Recent directors:

- Finn Sollie (1965–1978)
- Willy Østreng (1978–1999)
- Kåre Willoch (1999–2001)
- Willy Østreng (2001–2002)
- Arild Moe (2002–2004)
- Peter Johan Schei (2004–2012)
- Leiv Lunde (2012–2014)
- Arild Moe (2014–2015)
- Geir Hønneland (2015–2019)
- Iver B. Neumann (2020-)
