= Kenneth Mikkelsen =

Danish politician (born 1971)

Member of the Folketing
- Incumbent
- Assumed office 1 April 2021
- Constituency: West Jutland

Personal details
- Born: 12 August 1971 (age 54) Holstebro, Denmark
- Party: Venstre

Kenneth Dehn Mikkelsen (born 12 August 1971 in Holstebro) is a Danish politician, who is a member of the Folketing for the Venstre political party. He entered parliament on 1 April 2021 after Kristian Jensen resigned his seat.

== Political career ==
Mikkelsen ran for parliament in the 2019 Danish general election, and received 4,659 votes. He was not elected into parliament in the election, but became Venstre's primary substitute in the West Jutland constituency. When Kristian Jensen resigned his seat on 1 April 2021, Mikkelsen replaced him in parliament and took over the seat.
