= Elsbeth Tronstad =

Norwegian businessperson and politician

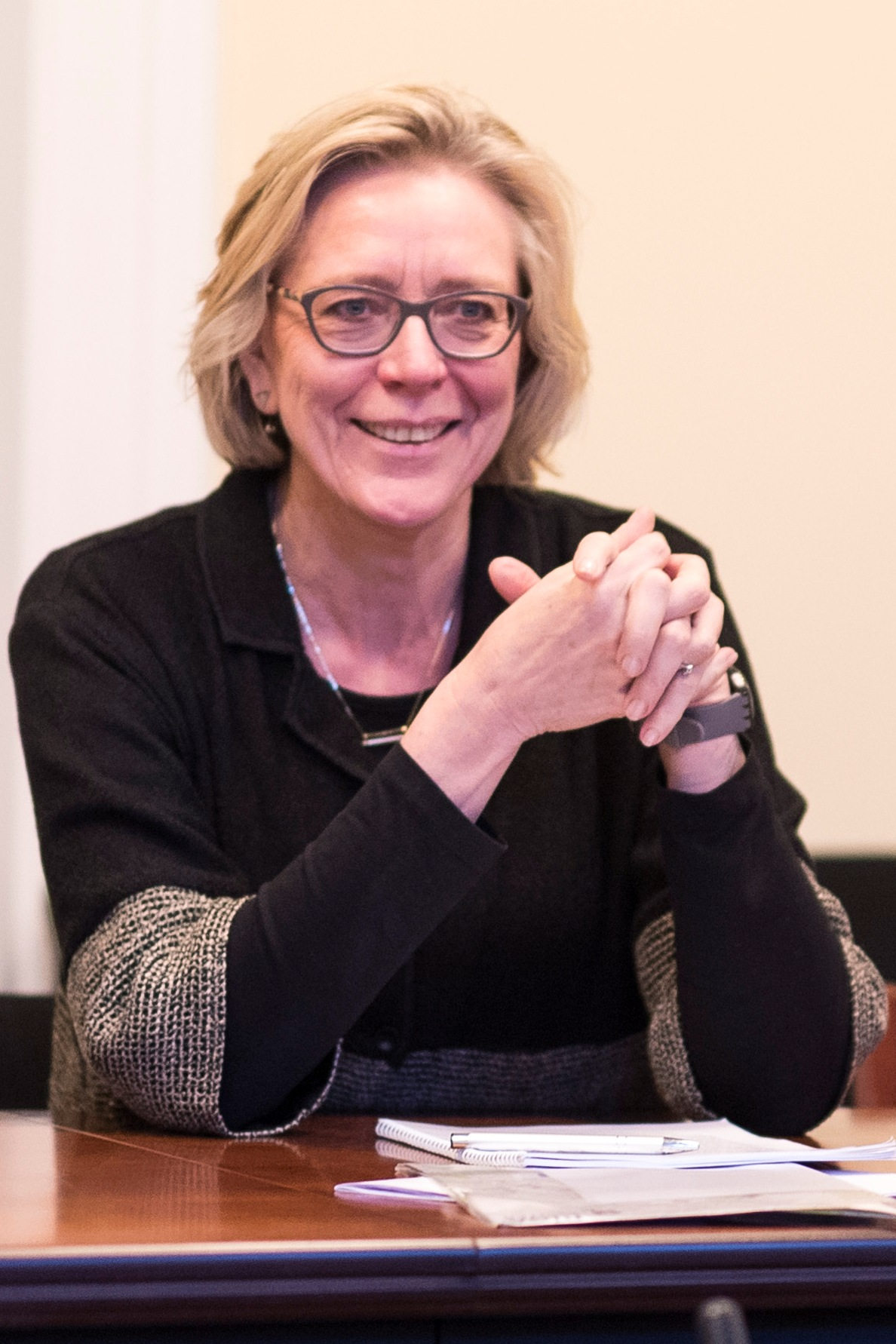
Elsbeth Tronstad in 2015

Elsbeth Tronstad (born 1956) is a Norwegian businessperson and politician for the Conservative Party.

From 2009 to 2014, she was the director of communication SN Power. From 2005 to 2009, she was the executive director for communication in the Confederation of Norwegian Enterprise. She has worked in the Norwegian Agency for Development Cooperation, Det Norske Veritas and ABB.

As a politician she served as private secretary (today known as political advisor) in the Office of the Prime Minister from 1989 to 1990, in Syse's Cabinet. From 2001 to 2002, under Bondevik's Second Cabinet, she was a State Secretary in Ministry of Foreign Affairs. Her third stint as a State Secretary was from June 2015 to September 2017, when she served in Solberg's Cabinet under ministers Vidar Helgesen, Elisabeth Aspaker and Frank Bakke Jensen. She is also a former member of Bærum municipal council.

Tronstad is the deputy chair of the board of directors of Vinmonopolet and the Norwegian Institute of International Affairs, is a member of the board of the DnB NOR Savings Bank Foundation and a former board member of Sparebanken NOR in Eastern Norway.
