= Second Bondevik cabinet =

Government of Norway from 2001 to 2005

Bondevik's Second Cabinet
- Cabinet of Norway

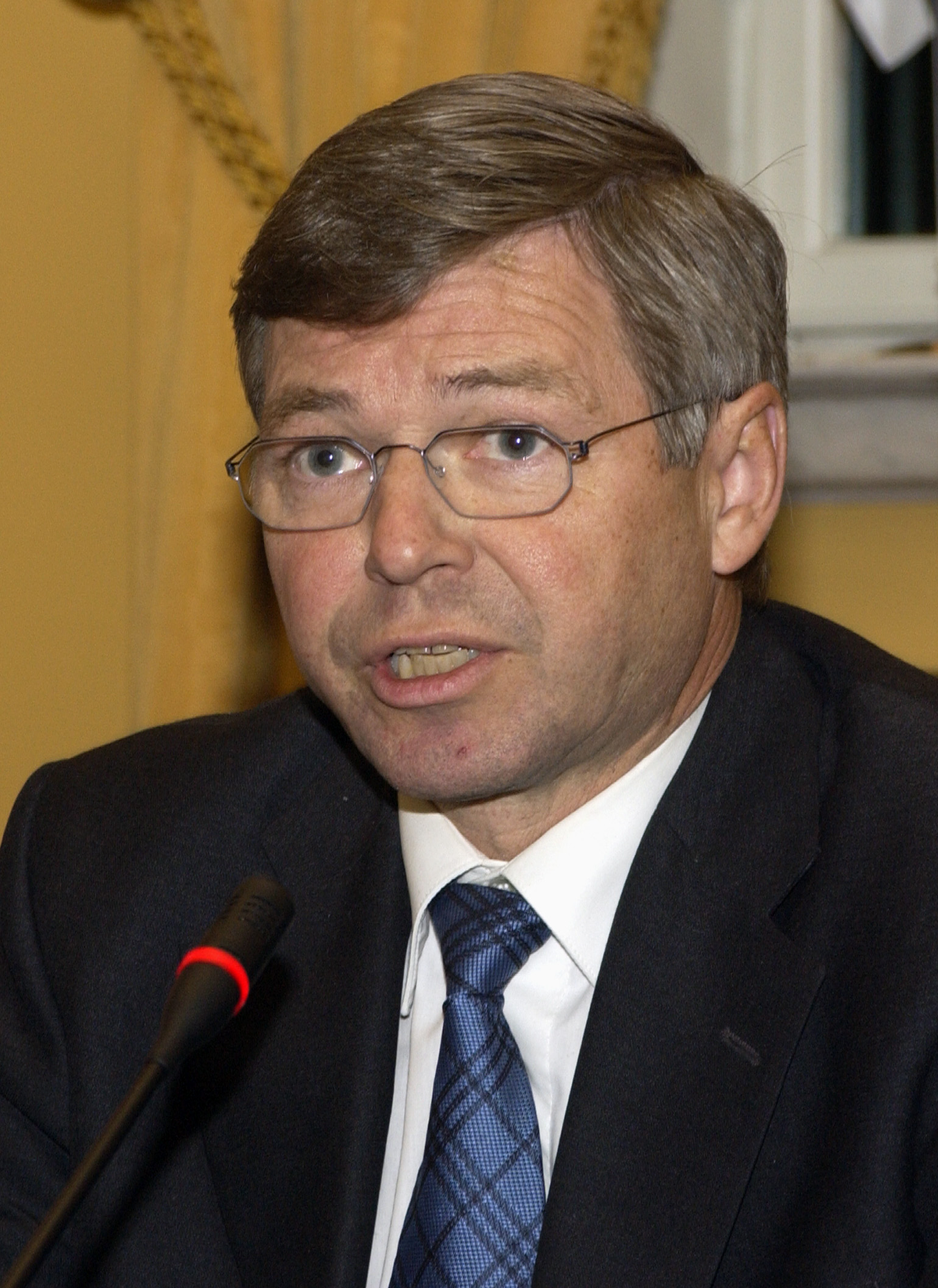
- Date formed: 19 October 2001
- Date dissolved: 17 October 2005

People and organisations
- King: Harald V of Norway
- Prime Minister: Kjell Magne Bondevik
- Ministers removed: 6
- Total no. of members: 25
- Member parties: Conservative Party; Christian Democratic Party; Liberal Party
- Status in legislature: Coalition (minority)

History
- Incoming formation: 2001 parliamentary election
- Outgoing formation: 2005 parliamentary election
- Election: 2001 parliamentary election
- Legislature term: 2001–2005
- Predecessor: Stoltenberg's First Cabinet
- Successor: Stoltenberg's Second Cabinet

Bondevik's Second Cabinet governed Norway between 19 October 2001 and 17 October 2005. It was led by Kjell Magne Bondevik and consisted of the Conservative Party, the Christian Democratic Party and the Liberal Party. It had the following composition:

== Cabinet members ==
Cabinet
Portfolio	Minister	Took office	Left office	Party
Prime Minister	Kjell Magne Bondevik	19 October 2001	17 October 2005	Christian Democratic
Minister of Foreign Affairs	Jan Petersen	19 October 2001	17 October 2005	Conservative
Minister of Defence	Kristin Krohn Devold	19 October 2001	17 October 2005	Conservative
Minister of Trade and Industry	Ansgar Gabrielsen	19 October 2001	18 June 2004	Conservative
Minister of Trade and Industry	Børge Brende	18 June 2004	17 October 2005	Conservative
Minister of Modernisation	Victor D. Norman	19 October 2001	8 March 2004	Conservative
Minister of Modernisation	Morten A. Meyer	8 March 2004	17 October 2005	Conservative
Minister of Finance	Per Kristian Foss	19 October 2001	17 October 2005	Conservative
Minister of Local Government and Regional Development	Erna Solberg	19 October 2001	17 October 2005	Conservative
Minister of Health and Care Services	Dagfinn Høybråten	19 October 2001	18 June 2004	Christian Democratic
Minister of Health and Care Services	Ansgar Gabrielsen	18 June 2004	17 October 2005	Conservative
Minister of Culture and Church Affairs	Valgerd Svarstad Haugland	19 October 2001	17 October 2005	Christian Democratic
Minister of Social Affairs	Ingjerd Schou	19 October 2001	18 June 2004	Conservative
Minister of Social Affairs	Dagfinn Høybråten	18 June 2004	17 October 2005	Christian Democratic
Minister of Transport and Communications	Torild Skogsholm	19 October 2001	17 October 2005	Liberal
Minister of Fisheries and Coastal Affairs	Svein Ludvigsen	19 October 2001	17 October 2005	Conservative
Minister of International Development	Hilde Frafjord Johnson	19 October 2001	17 October 2005	Christian Democratic
Minister of the Environment	Børge Brende	19 October 2001	18 June 2004	Conservative
Minister of the Environment	Knut Arild Hareide	18 June 2004	17 October 2005	Christian Democratic
Minister of Agriculture and Food	Lars Sponheim	19 October 2001	17 October 2005	Liberal
Minister of Justice and the Police	Odd Einar Dørum	19 October 2001	17 October 2005	Liberal
Minister of Children and Family Affairs	Laila Dåvøy	19 October 2001	17 October 2005	Christian Democratic
Minister of Petroleum and Energy	Einar Steensnæs	19 October 2001	18 June 2004	Christian Democratic
Minister of Petroleum and Energy	Thorhild Widvey	18 June 2004	17 October 2005	Conservative
Minister of Education and Research	Kristin Clemet	19 October 2001	17 October 2005	Conservative

== State Secretaries ==
Ministry	State Secretary	Period	Party
Office of the Prime Minister	Kari Husøy		Christian Democratic
Office of the Prime Minister	Gunnar Husan		Christian Democratic
Office of the Prime Minister	Odd Jostein Sæter		Christian Democratic
Office of the Prime Minister	Eirik Moen		Conservative
Office of the Prime Minister	Gunnar Kvassheim	– 30 September 2005	Liberal
Office of the Prime Minister	Siv Nordrum	16 November 2001 –	Christian Democratic
Ministry of Foreign Affairs	Kim Traavik		Conservative
Ministry of Foreign Affairs	Elsbeth Tronstad	– 31 December 2002	Conservative
Ministry of Foreign Affairs	Vidar Helgesen		Conservative
Ministry of Foreign Affairs	Olav Kjørven	26 October 2001 – 15 February 2005	Christian Democratic
Ministry of Foreign Affairs	Thorhild Widvey	31 January 2003 –	Conservative
Ministry of Foreign Affairs	Sylvi Graham	20 August 2004 –	Conservative
Ministry of Foreign Affairs	Leiv Lunde	16 February 2005 –	Christian Democratic
Ministry of Defence	Gunnar Heløe	26 October 2001 – 31 December 2003	Labour
Ministry of Industry and Trade	Helle Hammer	21 October 2005 – 14 December 2007	Conservative
Ministry of Industry and Trade	Oluf Ulseth	26 October 2001 – 18 June 2004	Conservative
Ministry of Industry and Trade	Lars Jacob Hiim	18 June 2004 – (leave of absence 21 February 2005 – 18 May 2005)	Conservative
Ministry of Industry and Trade	Tone Skogen	18 June 2004 –	Conservative
Ministry of Industry and Trade	Bjørn Johnny Skaar	21 February 2005 – 18 May 2005 (acting)	Labour
Ministry of Modernisation (named Ministry of Labour and Government Administration to 18 June 2004)	Osmund Kaldheim	1 January 2003 – 8 March 2004	Conservative
Ministry of Modernisation (named Ministry of Labour and Government Administration to 18 June 2004)	Eirik Lae Solberg	8 March 2004 –	Conservative
Ministry of Modernisation (named Ministry of Labour and Government Administration to 18 June 2004)	Eldbjørg Torsøe	8 March 2004 – 18 June 2004	Conservative
Ministry of Finance	Øystein Børmer		Conservative
Ministry of Finance	Kari Elisabeth Olrud Moen	(leave of absence 21 April 2004 – 31 July 2005)	Conservative
Ministry of Finance	Knut Arild Hareide	– 4 August 2003	Christian Democratic
Ministry of Finance	Harald Solberg	4 August 2003 –	Christian Democratic
Ministry of Finance	Helle Hammer	18 June 2004 – 31 July 2005 (acting)	Conservative
Ministry of Finance	Geir Olsen	1 January 2005 –	Liberal
Ministry of Local Government and Regional Development	Kristin Ørmen Johnsen	26 October 2001 – 18 January 2004	Conservative
Ministry of Local Government and Regional Development	Morten Andreas Meyer	26 October 2001 – 26 October 2003	Conservative
Ministry of Local Government and Regional Development	Anders Eira	26 October 2001 – 8 October 2004	Conservative
Ministry of Local Government and Regional Development	Frank Jenssen	20 October 2003 – 28 February 2005	Conservative
Ministry of Local Government and Regional Development	Cathrin Bretzeg	16 February 2004 –	Conservative
Ministry of Local Government and Regional Development	Ellen Inga Hætta	15 October 2004 –	Conservative
Ministry of Local Government and Regional Development	Roger Iversen	1 January 2005 –	Conservative
Ministry of Local Government and Regional Development	Just Hjalmar Johansen	21 February 2005 –	Conservative
Ministry of Social Affairs (named Ministry of Social Affairs and Health to 1 January 2002)	Kristin Ravnanger	– 1 January 2002	Christian Democratic
Ministry of Social Affairs (named Ministry of Social Affairs and Health to 1 January 2002)	Osmund Kaldheim	– 1 January 2003	Conservative
Ministry of Social Affairs (named Ministry of Social Affairs and Health to 1 January 2002)	Jan Otto Risebrobakken	1 January 2003 – 18 June 2004	Conservative
Ministry of Social Affairs (named Ministry of Social Affairs and Health to 1 January 2002)	Helge Eide	18 June 2004 – 1 October 2004	Christian Democratic
Ministry of Health and Care Services	Kristin Ravnanger	1 January 2002 – 1 October 2004	Christian Democratic
Ministry of Health and Care Services	Jan Otto Risebrobakken	18 June 2004 –	Conservative
Ministry of Health and Care Services	Elisabeth Aspaker	18 June 2004 – 30 September 2005	Conservative
Ministry of Culture and Church Affairs	Berit Øksnes Gjerløw		Christian Democratic
Ministry of Culture and Church Affairs	Yngve Slettholm		Christian Democratic
Ministry of Labour and Social Affairs	Lars Arne Ryssdal	26 October 2001 – 8 March 2004	Conservative
Ministry of Labour and Social Affairs	Christine Benedichte Meyer	1 November 2001 – 17 January 2003	Conservative
Ministry of Labour and Social Affairs	Helge Eide	1 October 2004 –	Conservative
Ministry of Labour and Social Affairs	Kristin Ravnanger	1 October 2004 –	Christian Democratic
Ministry of Transport and Communications	Arnfinn Ellingsen		Liberal
Ministry of Fisheries and Coastal Affairs	Solveig Strand	– 7 June 2002	Conservative
Ministry of Fisheries and Coastal Affairs	Thorhild Widvey	14 June 2002 – 31 January 2003	Conservative
Ministry of Fisheries and Coastal Affairs	Janne Johnsen	31 January 2003 –	Conservative
Ministry of the Environment	André Støylen	– 13 December 2002	Conservative
Ministry of the Environment	Lars Jacob Hiim	13 December 2002 – 18 June 2004	Conservative
Ministry of the Environment	Øyvind Håbrekke	18 June 2004 –	Christian Democratic
Ministry of Agriculture	Leif Helge Kongshaug	– 30 September 2005	Liberal
Ministry of Justice and Police	Jørn Holme	26 October 2001 – 18 June 2004	Liberal
Ministry of Justice and Police	Rita Sletner	26 October 2001 –	Liberal
Ministry of Justice and Police	Trond Prytz	18 June 2004 –	Liberal
Ministry of Children and Family Affairs	Odd Anders With	– 9 October 2003	Christian Democratic
Ministry of Children and Family Affairs	Hans Olav Syversen	9 October 2003 – 30 September 2005	Christian Democratic
Ministry of Petroleum and Energy	Brit Skjelbred	26 October 2001 – 27 February 2004	Christian Democratic
Ministry of Petroleum and Energy	Øyvind Håbrekke	27 February 2004 – 18 June 2004	Christian Democratic
Ministry of Petroleum and Energy	Oluf Ulseth	18 June 2004 –	Conservative
Ministry of Education and Research	Bjørn Haugstad		Conservative
Ministry of Education and Research	Helge Ole Bergesen	26 October 2001 –	Conservative

Preceded by Stoltenberg's first government	Norwegian Council of State; 2001–2005	Succeeded by Stoltenberg's second government
