= Ny Tid =

Norwegian current affairs website

- Owner(s): Truls Lie, Trygve Natvig, Erling Bonnevie Hjort, Ivar Evensmo, etc
- Editor: Truls Lie
- Headquarters: Oslo, Norway
- Website: www.nytid.no

Ny Tid (English: Modern Times Review) is a Norwegian current affairs website. It is currently owned by Ny Tid & Orientering AS. It is headed by Truls Lie, formerly the editor-in-chief of Morgenbladet and editor-in-chief/publisher of Le Monde diplomatique in Norway.

== History ==
=== Orientering ===
Ny Tid's predecessor was the weekly Orientering, which was founded as an independent weekly in January 1953. Its writers included Sigurd Evensmo (the first editor-in-chief), Jens Bjørneboe, and Johan Borgen. Evensmo was a member of the Student's Communist Organisation and had been active in the resistance against the Nazis in Norway; Bjørneboe was a self-described anarcho-nihilist who was at the center of literary life in Norway; and Borgen was an author sent to prison by the Nazis for his writings. Its founders were on the left of the Norwegian Labour Party; they led the breakaway Socialist People's Party from 1961.

=== 1975 launch ===
In 1973, the Socialist People's Party forged an alliance, named the Socialist Electoral League, with the Norwegian Communist Party and other left groups (including the Information Committee of the Labour Movement against Norwegian membership in the European Community), opposing Norwegian membership of the European Economic Community. In 1975, the non-Communist members of the League came together in the Socialist Left Party (SV). Ny Tid was the SV's newspaper, replacing Orientering. Its first editor was Audgunn Oltedal.

=== 2006 relaunch ===
On 24 January 2006, the publishing house Damm, a part of Egmont, acquired the Ny Tid website. On 27 January 2006, Ny Tid was relaunched as a news magazine. In January 2008, the magazine was transferred to a new media group, Monitor Medier, which, at the same time, also purchased the monthly Le Monde Diplomatique French magazine.

After the relaunch in January 2006, the independent magazine printed columns by writers including Noreena Hertz (Great Britain), Irshad Manji (Canada), Anna Funder (Australia), Shah Muhammad Rais (Afghanistan), Saskia Sassen (USA), Natalia Novozhilova, and Anna Politkovskaya (Russia), the independent journalist assassinated after a series of articles she published about corruption and the KGB under the Putin presidency. In its "Voices Without Borders" series, columnists havwe included Parvin Ardalan, Nawal El Saadawi, Irshad Manji, Elena Milashina, Katiuska Natera, Martha Roque, Blessing Musariri, Tsering Woeser, Orzala Ashraf Nemat and Natalia Novozhilova. The columns are mostly written in English. This series was a project in memory of Anna Politkovskaja, who was a Ny Tid columnist from 10 February to 7 October 2006. The magazine had a global outlook with most of its articles focusing on international current events. It was published in Norwegian for its print edition and in both English and Norwegian for its online edition. It covered politics, culture, environmental issues, and international affairs. The editorial staff was based in Oslo.

=== 2015 redesign ===
In 2015, Ny Tid was changed to a monthly broadsheet newspaper for summer 2015. The main focus is peace&war, migration, climate, new media, and international documentary films and non-fiction books.

The publication was also distributed as an insert with the left-wing daily newspaper Klassekampen, an arrangement terminated in 2017 when Ny Tid published an article that Klassekampen said uncritically conveyed the conspiracy community's claim about the 9/11 terror attacks. Ny Tid alleged that the buildings in the World Trade Center did not collapse because of the planes that hit them, but as a result of a large-scale secret operation in which hundreds of explosive charges had been placed in advance in all the supporting structures of the buildings so that the towers collapsed, such that the air strikes against the twin towers must have been a "cover up" operation to divert attention.

== Editors ==
- Truls Lie 2015–present
- Dag Herbjørnsrud 2008–2015
- Martine Aurdal 2006–2008
- Dag Herbjørnsrud 2005–2006
- Anders Horn 2001–2005
- Anne Hege Simonsen 1998–2001
- Runar I. Malkenes 1995–1998
- Turid Grønlund 1994–1995
- Gunnar Ringheim 1991–1994
- Bernt Eggen 1989–1991
- Finn Gustavsen 1986–1989
- Ingolf Håkon Teigene 1982–1986
- Steinar Hansson 1979–1982
- Audgunn Oltedal 1975–1979

== Circulation ==
Ny Tid: Circulation 1979–2013.

As a newspaper:

- 1979: 16267
- 1980: 15117
- 1981: 15662
- 1982: 15474
- 1983: 14722
- 1984: 14945
- 1985: 13482
- 1986: 12659
- 1987: 10877
- 1988: 9803
- 1989: 9071
- 1990: 8021
- 1991: 8212
- 1992: 8155
- 1993: -
- 1994: 6950
- 1995: 5704
- 1996: 5593
- 1997: 4722
- 1998: 4772
- 1999: 4095
- 2000: 3939
- 2001: 4599
- 2002: 4834
- 2003: 4519
- 2004: 4199
- 2005: 4320

As a magazine:

- 2006: 9258
- 2007: 7671
- 2008: 4811
- 2009: 4774
- 2015: 35 000 (included in Klassekampen
