= Orientering =

Norwegian left-wing newspaper, 1952–1975

Orientering (lit. 'Orientation Circle') was a Norwegian left-wing newspaper launched in December 1952 and incorporated into the SV's new newspaper Ny Tid in 1975. The first trial issue was published in December 1952, and from 1953-1960 it was published biweekly. From 1960 onwards, the newspaper was published weekly. Its circulation, initially several thousand, peaked at 19,000 in 1974 and fell to 16,000 by the final issue. Key figures continued contributing to Ny Tid.

Domestic issues gained prominence after Finn Gustavsen became editor in 1957. The debate over Norwegian security policy intensified when the Labour Party’s 1961 national conference allowed nuclear weapons deployment during war or crisis, though it upheld a 1957 ban on nuclear weapons in peacetime, supported by a large Storting majority in April 1961.

In 1961, key Orientering figures founded the Socialist People's Party (SF). Gustavsen and Knut Løfsnes, the party leader, became its first Storting representatives. Orientering became the SF’s mouthpiece. The SF formally acquired the newspaper in 1973.

Between 1974 and 1975, coalition talks among left-wing parties, following the Socialist Electoral Alliance’s success in the 1973 election, led to the Socialist Left Party (SV) replacing the SF, Norwegian Communist Party (which later withdrew), and Democratic Socialists, with independent socialist support.

== History ==
Orientering was established primarily to address the difficulties experienced by critics of NATO and Western capitalism in publishing their views in mainstream newspapers. Initially, an internal conflict emerged among editors of Orientering, particularly between supporters of communism and partisans of the Norwegian Labour Party (DNA) not willing to join the Norwegian Communist Party (NKP). In 1953, the DNA's left-wing faction led by Karl Evang won the dispute. Sigurd Evensmo became the editor and spokesperson, with Finn Gustavsen as editorial secretary. They received support from several former Labour Party members, including the party's first Prime Minister, Christopher Hornsrud.

The political line of Orientering was to promote a socialist alternative to the division into blocs ('the third position'). They envisaged a bloc-independent position with room for criticism of both Moscow and Washington, because of the political polarisation of Norwegian socialism between the Soviet-aligned NKP and the American-aligned DNA. As a result, the newspaper was virtually ignored by the Labour press, which may have contributed to increased interest.

From the outset, the newspaper was characterised by foreign policy topics which were central during the Cold War. Orientering was a staunch opponent of Norwegian NATO membership. Domestic political issues became increasingly prominent after Gustavsen became editor in 1957. Norwegian security policy debate came to a head with the question of the deployment of nuclear weapons in Norway when the Labour Party's national conference in 1961 passed a resolution opening up the possibility in the event of war or crisis. Nevertheless, the Labour Party upheld its 1957 decision prohibiting nuclear weapons on Norwegian soil in peacetime, with the support of a large majority in the Storting in April 1961.

During this time, key figures in the Orientering circle considered starting a new socialist party, which became a reality with the establishment of the Socialist People's Party (SF) in April 1961. Gustavsen became one of the party's first two representatives, with Knut Løfsnes as party leader. Orientering quickly became the mouthpiece for the SF, while doubling its publication frequency to weekly. The newspaper was formally taken over by the SF in 1973.

Between 1974 and 1975, coalition negotiations were held between the parties to the left of the Labour Party following the electoral success of the Socialist Electoral Alliance in 1973. The Socialist Left Party (SV) was established in 1975 to replace the Socialist People's Party (SF), the Norwegian Communist Party (which later withdrew) and the Democratic Socialists, with the support of a number of independent socialists.

In connection with this process, Orientering was discontinued and incorporated into the SV's new party newspaper, Ny Tid. Initially, several thousand copies were in circulation; this number gradually grew to roughly 19,000 in 1974 and decreased to 16,000 when the last issue was published. Key figures in the Orientering milieu continued their work in and around the new newspaper.

== Editors ==
- Jacob Friis (1952)
- Sigurd Evensmo (1953–1959)
- Finn Gustavsen (1959–1961)
- Sigurd Evensmo (1961–1963)
- Finn Gustavsen (1963–1965)
- Kjell Cordtsen (1965–1969)
- Lars Alldén (1969–1971)
- Kjell Cordtsen (1971–1975)
