= 1965 Norwegian parliamentary election =

- 12 and 13 September 1965

All 150 seats in the Storting 76 seats needed for a majority
- Turnout: 85.4%
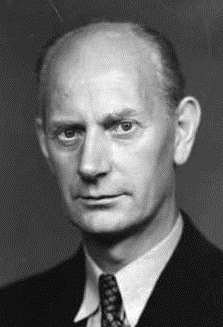

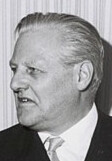

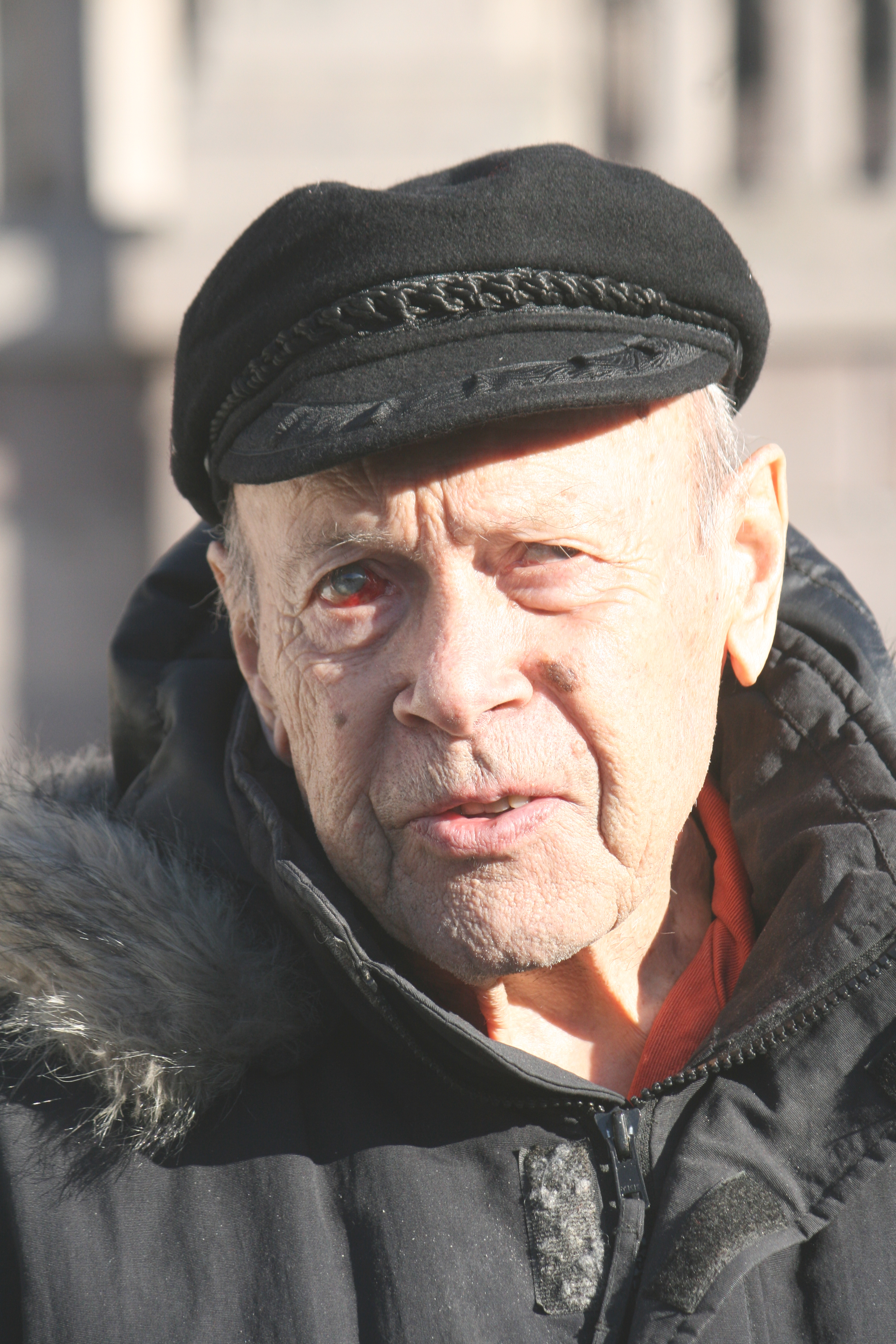

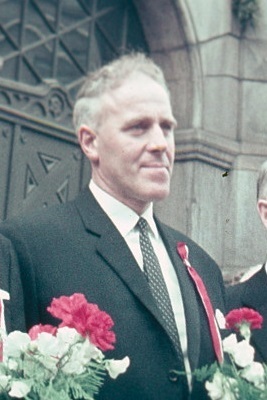
	First party	Second party	Third party
Leader	Einar Gerhardsen	John Lyng	Gunnar Garbo
Party	Labour	Conservative	Liberal
Last election	46.8%, 74 seats	20.4%, 29 seats	11.3%, 14 seats
Seats won	68	31	18
Seat change	▼6	▲2	▲4
Popular vote	883,320	438,412^{[a]}	222,547^{[b]}
Percentage	43.1%	21.4%^{[a]}	10.9%^{[b]}
	Fourth party	Fifth party	Sixth party
Leader	Per Borten	Einar Hareide	Knut Løfsnes
Party	Centre	Christian; Democratic	Socialist People's
Last election	10.9%, 16 seats	10.4%, 15 seats	2.4%, 2 seats
Seats won	18	13	2
Seat change	▲2	▼2	0
Popular vote	206,415^{[b]}	183,131^{[b]}	122,721
Percentage	10.1%^{[b]}	8.9%^{[b]}	6.0%
- Largest bloc and seats won by constituency
Prime Minister before election
Einar Gerhardsen
Labour
Prime Minister after election
Per Borten
Centre

Parliamentary elections were held in Norway on 12 and 13 September 1965. The Labour Party remained the largest party, winning 68 of the 150 seats. However, the four non-socialist parties succeeded in winning a majority between them and forming a government. Per Borten, the leader of the Centre Party, became prime minister.

== Contesting parties ==
Name		Ideology	Position	Leader	1961 result	
Name		Ideology	Position	Leader	Votes (%)	Seats
Ap	Labour Party; Arbeiderpartiet	Social democracy	Centre-left	Einar Gerhardsen	46.7%	74 / 150
H	Conservative Party; Høyre	Conservatism	Centre-right	John Lyng	19.2%	28 / 150
KrF	Christian Democratic Party; Kristelig Folkeparti	Christian democracy	Centre to centre-right	Einar Hareide	9.3%	14 / 150
V	Liberal Party; Venstre	Social liberalism	Centre	Gunnar Garbo	7.2%	11 / 150
Sp	Centre Party; Senterpartiet	Agrarianism	Centre	Per Borten	6.8%	11 / 150
NKP	Communist Party of Norway; Norges Kommunistiske Parti	Communism	Far-left	Reidar T. Larsen	2.9%	0 / 155
SF	Socialist People's Party; Sosialistisk Folkeparti	Socialism	Left-wing to Far-left	Knut Løfsnes	2.3%	2 / 150

== Campaign ==
=== Slogans ===
Party	Original slogan	English translation
Labour Party	"Nye muligheter - Nye mål"	"New opportunities - New goals"
Conservative Party	"På parti med fremtiden"	"On the side of the future"
Liberal Party		
Farmer's Party		
Christian Democratic Party		
Communist Party of Norway		

=== National daily newspaper endorsements ===
Newspaper	Party endorsed
Sør-Trøndelag	Liberal Party

== Results ==
Party	Votes	%	Seats	+/–
Labour Party	883,320	43.14	68	–6
Conservative Party	415,612	20.30	30	+2
Liberal Party	207,834	10.15	18	+4
Centre Party	191,702	9.36	17	+2
Christian Democratic Party	160,331	7.83	12	–2
Socialist People's Party	122,721	5.99	2	0
Communist Party	27,996	1.37	0	0
Christians–Conservatives (Note: The joint list of the Conservative Party and the Christian Democratic Party won two seats, with the parties taking one each.)	22,800	1.11	2	–
Centrists–Liberals (Note: The joint list of the Centre Party and the Liberal Party won one seat, taken by the Centre Party.)	14,713	0.72	1	–
Democratic Party	194	0.01	0	New
Freedom Protectors	163	0.01	0	New
Wild votes	8	0.00	–	–
Total	2,047,394	100.00	150	0
Valid votes	2,047,394	99.58		
Invalid/blank votes	8,697	0.42		
Total votes	2,056,091	100.00		
Registered voters/turnout	2,406,866	85.43		
Source: Nohlen & Stöver

=== Voter demographics ===
Cohort	Percentage of cohort voting for						
Cohort	Ap	H	V	Sp	KrF	SF	Others
Total vote	43.1%	21.4%	10.9%	10.1%	8.9%	6.0%	
Gender
Females	44.1%	22.3%	11%	8.7%	9.5%	3.9%	
Males	43.9%	19.1%	9.7%	10.3%	6.5%	8.2%	
Age
18–30 years old	39.9%	22.3%	10.1%	10.1%	7.6%	9.2%	
30-59 years old	46.2%	19.8%	10.9%	8.9%	6.1%	6.9%	
60 years old and older	40.9%	22%	9%	11%	13%	1.7%	
Work
low income	43.4%	13.3%	9.2%	15.3%	12.9%	4.2%	
Average income	53.8%	12.9%	10.5%	7.3%	5.8%	7.7%	
High income	36.3%	34.2%	12.1%	5.1%	4.7%	6.8%	
Education
Primary school	59.5%	7.2%	7.6%	8.9%	7.1%	7.2%	
High school	38.1%	24.2%	11.9%	11.2%	8.7%	5.3%	
University/college	13.1%	53.7%	13.7%	5.1%	8%	5.1%	
Source: Norwegian Institute for Social Research

=== Seat distribution ===
Constituency	Total seats	Seats won					
Constituency	Total seats	Ap	H	V	Sp	KrF	SF
Akershus	7	3	2	1	1		
Aust-Agder	4	2	1	1			
Bergen	5	2	1	1		1	
Buskerud	7	4	2		1		
Finnmark	4	3	1				
Hedmark	8	5	1		2		
Hordaland	10	3	2	2	1	2	
Møre og Romsdal	10	3	1	2	2	2	
Nord-Trøndelag	6	3		1	2		
Nordland	12	6	2	1	1	1	1
Oppland	7	4	1		2		
Oslo	13	6	5	1			1
Østfold	8	4	2		1	1	
Rogaland	10	3	2	2	1	2	
Sogn og Fjordane	5	1	1	1	1	1	
Sør-Trøndelag	10	5	2	1	1	1	
Telemark	6	3	1	1		1	
Troms	6	3	1	1	1		
Vest-Agder	5	2	1	1		1	
Vestfold	7	3	2	1	1		
Total	150	68	31	18	18	13	2
Source: Norges Offisielle Statistikk
