= Steinar Hansson =

Norwegian journalist and publisher

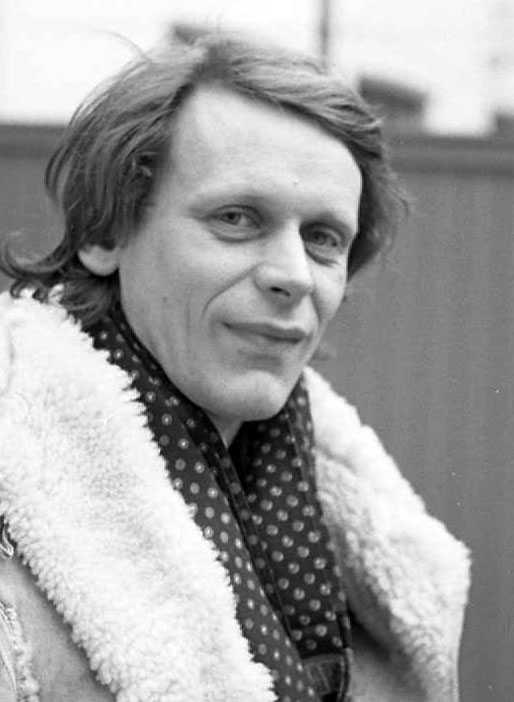
- Steinar Hansson c.1980
- Born: 31 May 1947; Asker, Norway
- Died: 3 August 2004 (aged 57)
- Occupations: Journalist; Publisher

Steinar Hansson (31 May 1947 – 3 August 2004) was a Norwegian journalist and publisher. He was born in Asker. He worked as an editor in the publishing house Pax Forlag, and edited the newspaper Ny Tid from 1979. From 1983, he worked for the publishing house J.W. Cappelens Forlag. He was cultural editor for the newspaper Arbeiderbladet, and later for Dagbladet. He was chief editor of Arbeiderbladet (renamed to Dagsavisen in 1997) from 1995 to 2001

He was awarded The Great Journalist Prize in 1999.

== Books ==
- Operasjon Libanon. En reportasjebok om Israels okkupasjon av Sør-Libanon, 1978
- Sosialisme på norsk. (Editor together with Rune Slagstad), 1981
- Makt og mannefall. Historien om Gro Harlem Brundtland, (with Ingolf Håkon Teigene), 1992
- Fordømte forfattere og andre essays, 1994
- Johan Jørgen Holst, 1994
