= Berit Ås =

Norwegian politician (1928–2024)

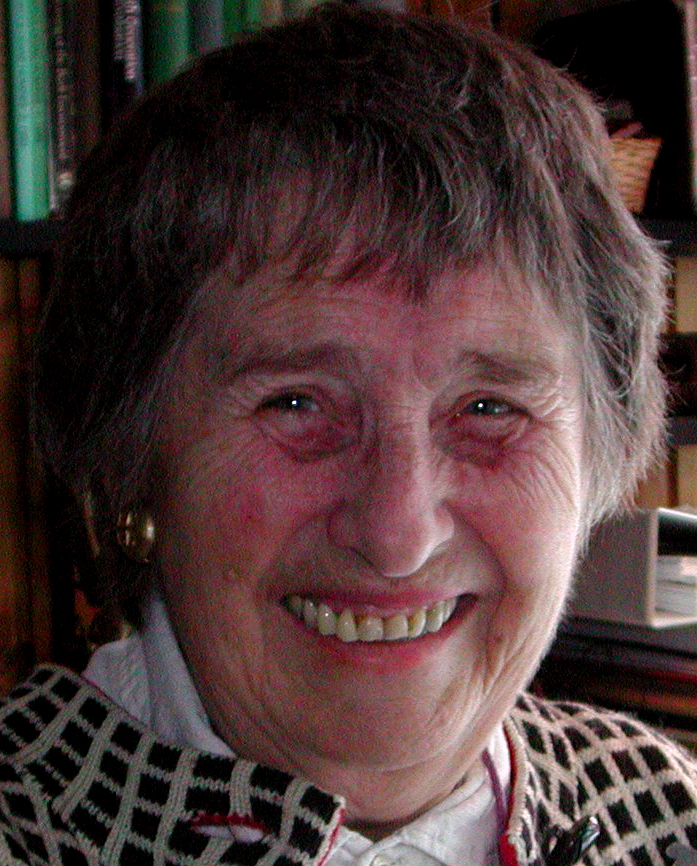
- Ås in 2004

Member of the Storting
- In office 1973–1977
- Constituency: Oslo

Leader of the Socialist Left Party
- In office 16 March 1975 – 17 April 1976
- Preceded by: Position established
- Succeeded by: Berge Furre

Personal details
- Born: Berit Skarpaas; 10 April 1928 Fredrikstad, Norway
- Died: 14 September 2024 (aged 96) Asker, Norway
- Party: Norwegian Labour Party (until 1973); Democratic Socialists (Norway) (1973–1975); Socialist Left Party (from 1975)
- Profession: Professor of Social Psychology

Berit Ås (née Skarpaas; 10 April 1928 – 14 September 2024) was a Norwegian politician, social psychologist, and feminist.

Ås was the first leader of the Socialist Left Party (1975–1976), and served as a Member of the Parliament of Norway 1973–1977. She was also a deputy member of parliament from 1969 to 1973 (for the Norwegian Labour Party), and from 1977 to 1981 (for the Socialist Left Party). She was a professor of social psychology at the University of Oslo. She is known for helping popularize the master suppression techniques originally proposed by Ingjald Nissen, and her research interests also include feminist economics and women's culture. Some of her initiatives after her retirement were criticised for promoting conspiracy theories.

== Academic career ==
Ås's parents were teachers. Her mother and maternal grandmother were both politically active, and her father was an avid reader and inventor. She completed her secondary education with the examen artium in 1947, followed by a cand. psychol. degree at the University of Oslo in 1953. Following one year as a primary school teacher at Eiksmarka, she worked on issues related to smoking hazards, eventually becoming a member of Statens tobakksskaderåd from its establishment in 1971, consumer protection, children's safety, and housing. She taught and conducted research on women's issues at the University of Oslo, where she was an Assistant Professor of Psychology 1969–1980, Associate Professor 1980–1991 and full Professor of Social Psychology from 1991 until she retired in 1994. In 1983, she, Suzanne Stiver Lie, and Maj Birgit Rørslett, were commissioned to start an experimental project and establish Norway's first Women's University. She was a visiting professor at the University of Missouri (1967–68), Mount Saint Vincent University (1983), Uppsala University (1989), Saint Mary's University (Halifax) (1997), and St. Scholastica's College (1999).

== Political career ==
Ås was for several years a member of the Norwegian Labour Party. Her first political office was in the municipal council in Asker in 1967. Four years later, she led with Karla Skaare, the leader of Asker Husmorlag, what was later known as the non-partisan "women's coup" in 1971, when women achieved majority representation in three of Norway's largest municipal assemblies. In Asker, this initiative was spearheaded by Berit Ås, Tove Billington Bye, Marie Borge Refsum and Kari Bjerke Andreassen. She was a deputy member of parliament for the Labour Party 1969–1973.

She was effectively expelled from the Labour Party during the 1972 EU debate. She was actively involved in the Information Committee of the Labour Movement against Norwegian membership in the European Community (AIK), and eventually elected the leader of AIK in 1973. When AIK went on to register itself as the Democratic Socialists in 1973, Ås became the first leader, from 1973 to 1975. The party joined the Socialist Electoral League (SV), which was formed in April 1973. Ås was elected member of the Storting for the period 1973 to 1977, for the Socialist Electoral League. When SV became the Socialist Left Party in 1975, Ås was elected the first leader of the party, and was further deputy leader from 1976 to 1979.

Ås led several political campaigns, including Kvinner for fred, inspired by the Women Strike for Peace, the women's movement against membership in the European Union, and others. She also made important contributions to the feminist cause in Norway. She led efforts to establish the Feminist University in Norway in the 1980s, and formulated five Master suppression techniques which she claimed were used against women in particular, though these may be used against other disadvantaged groups as well. She co-founded the Nordic Women's University in 2011.

In 1973, she stayed with John Lennon and Yoko Ono in their Manhattan apartment for a week, while participating at the Women's Conference. Lennon had become interested in meeting Ås after having read one of her speeches; rumor has it that she didn't know who Lennon was.

She contributed the piece "More power to women!" to the 1984 anthology Sisterhood Is Global: The International Women's Movement Anthology, edited by Robin Morgan.

== Conspiracy theories ==
In her later years, she became known for her promotion of conspiracy theories, including 9/11 conspiracy theories. Participating in a discussion forum in 2008, aged 79, she presented alternative theories for the 9/11 attacks, which drew criticism from the press and politicians.

== Personal life and death ==
Born in Fredrikstad on 10 April 1928, Ås was the daughter of schoolteachers Knut Knutsen Skarpaas and Ingeborg Stokke, the oldest of four siblings. She married Dagfinn Ås in 1950, and they had four children. Ås was a sister-in-law of Berthold Grünfeld.

Ås died in Asker on 14 September 2024, at the age of 96.

== Honours ==
Ås held honorary doctorates at the University of Copenhagen, Uppsala University, and Mount Saint Vincent University. In 1997, she received the Rachel Carson Prize, an award that was established spontaneously on her initiative in 1991. In 1997, she was also decorated as a Knight First Class of the Order of St. Olav.

== Selected publications ==
- Ås, Berit (1981). Kvinner i alle land … Håndbok i frigjøring (in Norwegian). Aschehoug. ISBN 978-82-03-23666-2.

== See also ==
- Berit Ås tenure as leader for the Socialist Left Party
