= Ole Wiig =

Norwegian politician

Ole Wiig (23 June 1923 – 21 September 2014) was a Norwegian civil servant and politician for the Labour and Socialist Left parties.

== Career ==
He was born in Bergen as a son of Hans William Konrad Wiig (1889–1941) and Sofie Sigvarda Olsen (1891–1973). He underwent training and worked in the Norwegian State Railways from 1940 to 1945. He finished secondary education in 1946 and graduated with the cand.oecon. in 1950. He was deputy chair of Norsk Studentsamband in 1948 and chaired the Norwegian Students' Society in 1952.

He was hired as a secretary in the Ministry of Local Government and Labour in 1951, advancing to consultant. After one year at Norges Kommunal- og Sosialskole from 1960 to 1961 he returned to the Ministry of Local Government and Labour as assistant secretary.

In 1969 he became a research fellow at NAVF, continuing in the research sector. He was assisting director in Forskningspolitisk Råd from 1970 to 1989, adviser at the Norwegian Institute of International Affairs from 1989 to 1993 and researcher from 1993. He was an active debater ahead of the 1994 Norwegian European Union membership referendum.

== Political career ==
Wiig was a member of Ski municipal council from 1959 to 1975, in the executive committee from 1963 to 1967. He served as a deputy representative to the Parliament of Norway from Akershus during the term 1969–1973, representing the Labour Party.

In 1972, however, he became leader of the Information Committee of the Labour Movement against Norwegian membership in the European Community. When it registered as the political party Democratic Socialists – AIK in 1973, he became deputy chair, serving until 1975. AIK also joined the Socialist Electoral League, later the Socialist Left Party; Wiig was a national board member here from 1973 to 1977. He also served as a deputy representative to Parliament during the term 1973–1977. In total he met during 149 days of parliamentary session.

Wiig was the deputy chair of the Norwegian Committee for Democracy in Greece from 1970 to 1974, board member of Øvre Smaalenene from 1976 to 1996, a supervisory council in the Bank of Norway from 1975 to 1980, the Norwegian UNESCO commission from 1977 to 1984.
