= Democratic Socialists (Norway) =

Democratic Socialists Demokratiske Sosialister
- Leader: Berit Ås
- Founded: 1973
- Dissolved: 1976
- Merged into: Socialist Left Party
- Ideology: Democratic socialism Euroscepticism
- National affiliation: Socialist Electoral League

The Democratic Socialists (Norwegian: Demokratiske Sosialister) was a political party in Norway. It was formed in 1973 with a basis in the Information Committee of the Labour Movement against Norwegian membership in the European Community (AIK), which was the organized opposition to Norwegian membership in the then European Community, now the European Union, within the Labour Party. The organized EC opponents chose to break with the party and established the Democratic Socialists (AIK), which participated in the 1973 Norwegian parliamentary election as part of the Socialist Electoral Association. In 1975, the party was involved in the establishment of the Socialist Left Party (SV), and as a consequence of this, the party closed itself down in 1976.

The first leader of the Democratic Socialists was Storting representative Berit Ås, and she thus became the country's first female party leader.

== Election history ==
Year	Share of the votes	Mandates
1973	11.2%	2 / 155
