= History of the Socialist Left Party =

Aspect of Norwegian political history

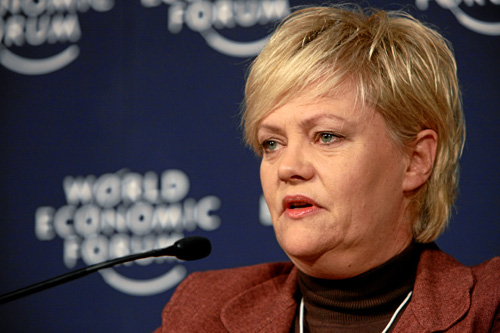
Former party leader Kristin Halvorsen at the World Economic Forum panel discussion in January 2008

The Socialist Left Party of Norway (Norwegian: Sosialistisk Venstreparti or SV) was founded in 1975. Its history shows a long-term rise in political influence, resulting in part from its emergence from older left-wing parties, especially the Socialist People's Party. After initial political setbacks in the 1970s, the party reorganized and regained support, particularly under Theo Koritzinsky (1983–87) and Erik Solheim (1987–97). Support dropped in the 1997 parliamentary election but rose again by the 21st Century, thanks to the party's position as the only sizeable party to the left of the Norwegian Labour Party. Labour's move further to the right under Jens Stoltenberg also helped the party's rise. By 2005, the Socialist Left Party had joined the Labour and Centre parties in Norway's governing Red-Green Coalition. The party has been led by Kirsti Bergstø since 18 March 2023.

== Formation and early years (1973–76) ==
=== Socialist Electoral League (1973–75) ===
Year	Vote %	Type
1973	11.2%	Parliament

After losing all of its seats in the 1969 parliamentary election, the Socialist People's Party sought to create a coalition of various left-wing parties. Although previously sceptical about working with the Communist Party, it became a member of the coalition, along with the Democratic Socialists – AIK and various independent socialists. Reidar T. Larsen, then leader of the Communist Party, said that members at the party's national convention voted unanimously in favour of joining the coalition, which would later go by the name of the Socialist Electoral League.

The four leading members of the coalition were Finn Gustavsen, Berge Furre (both from the Socialist People's Party), Berit Ås (from AIK) and Larsen (from the Communist Party). Furre and Ås emphasized that the three parties were still operating independently in 1973, while Larsen was very pleased with the outcome, saying that the main object of the Communist Party was to "unite all socialist parties" in one joint cause. The coalition also stressed that they did not want to create a joint platform for the three parties, claiming it to be unimportant for their image. A meeting in September elected Gustavsen as parliamentary leader of the coalition, Roald Halvorsen from the Communist Party as general secretary, and Larsen and Ås to the group board. It was decided that Torild Skard would seek the position of President of the Storting. After the meeting, the party sought to build a closer relationship with the Labour Party and said they would support a Labour-run minority government.

=== Communist Party and founding (1975) ===
By late 1975, most Communist Party members were against dissolving the party to join what would become the Socialist Left. Reidar T. Larsen, the party leader at the time, supported dissolving the party, while deputy leader Martin Gunnar Knutsen wanted it to continue. Signs before the election showed that the majority supported Knudsen. The media speculated that a faction led by Larsen would split from the party to join the ranks of the Socialist Left.

In the Oslo chapter of the coalition, the Communist Party wanted Arne Jørgensen, editor-in-chief of the Norwegian newspaper Friheten, to get the top position on the election list for the 1975 local elections. However, most Socialist People's Party members in the Oslo chapter did not want him to top the list, because of his background in Norwegian local politics. Socialist People's Party members stated that they had nothing against nominating Communist Party members, pointing out that they had placed communist Karl Kromann in second place. Jørgensen lost the election for the first spot, instead obtaining 11th place on the list and eventually losing his nomination to Socialist People's Party official Fred Dunhaug. Parliamentary leader Finn Gustavsen officially endorsed Jørgensen's candidacy during the national convention in Trondheim, saying he did not want to "split the coalition", which would wreck his plan to unite the coalition into one political party. In May, the Oslo chapter of the coalition held an oral ballot for the top place on the election list, and Jørgensen received 189 votes against Dunhaug's 192. Because the margin was so small, they decided to hold a written ballot, and Dunhaug received 197 votes to Jørgensen's 196. After this result, twenty-one other communist candidates withdrew from their candidacy. This event damaged the unification process and internal conflict continued.

Another conflict between the Socialist People's Party and the Communist Party was the proposal to merge the two party papers, Friheten and Orientering, into a new one. However, Larsen rejected this offer, preferring the two papers to continue even if the two parties merged. Berit Ås felt that the party leadership had weakened its position, saying that they had "kicked the ball over to the communists". After the Communist Party rejected the offer, Orientering was replaced by Ny Tid.

While it was always clear where Larsen stood in the unification process, ever since he became leader of the Communist Party in 1969, he had been able to maintain a strong following in the party. But his support started to waver when he wanted to put an end to the pro-Soviet line the party had held under the leadership of Emil Løvlien. Larsen had always held a vision of one single united left-wing party to the left of Labour, but this vision was not supported by the communist hardliners. In the aftermath of the Communist Party national convention, Larsen said that his speech was "behind closed doors – and behind closed ears". He suffered a clear defeat at the party conference, and he and his remaining supporters left the Communist Party to join the Socialist Left, newly founded by the Socialist People's Party and the AIK without the Communist Party. Because the policies of the Socialist Left were nearly identical to those of the Socialist People's Party, it has often been seen as the latter's direct successor.

=== Berit Ås (1975–76) ===
Year	Vote %	Type
1975	5.5% 5.7%	Municipal; County

Berit Ås, a compromise candidate for the party leadership, was elected at the so-called unification congress. During the 1975 local elections she became the party's most influential figure. However, her campaigning and her debating skills were criticised both by the Norwegian press and within her own party. During the election campaign, Ås wanted to become the party's representative at the leader debates, a position held since the 1960s by Finn Gustavsen from the Socialist People's Party. The weekly newspaper Dag og Tid described Ås' performance at the leader debates as "messy".

At the party's first national convention in November 1975, it was decided to maintain "a soft party line" towards the remaining Communist Party members still active in the Socialist Left Party. However, they did urge them to leave the Communist Party. Rune Fredh, who had supported Larsen in the Communist Party, called the situation "insane". He still believed that Larsen and the remaining communists would continue to fight for communism in the Soviet Union and the Eastern Bloc.

After experiencing what many observers called a bad election in 1976, a national convention was held early in 1976. During her short tenure, Ås lost all trust amongst party members. Several leading members were calling for Berge Furre to take over as party chairman. However, early in the nomination process, there were rumours that the party's AIK-Communist wing would establish a united front against former Socialist People's Party members. No factions or party notables supported Ås for reelection. It was decided at the convention that Socialist Left Party members could only be members of one party at the time, which meant that the remaining Communist Party members were forced to choose between the Socialist Left Party and the Communist Party. Larsen and Fredh, the Socialist Left Party Secretary, told delegates at the convention that "from now on, the road the Communist Party is following is its own". Furre was elected as party chairman at this convention, with little or no opposition.

On the election list for the 1977 election, Ås became the party's second candidate in Oslo for a seat in the Storting, having lost first place to Stein Ørnhøi. Because of the party's internal difficulties, its electoral base was greatly weakened in 1977: only one Socialist Left candidate from Oslo, and only two nationwide, won seats in the Storting.

== Berge Furre (1976–83) ==
=== Early leadership and internal strife (1976–77) ===
Berge Furre, previously known unofficially as the Socialist People's Party's "crown prince", became party chairman after the feud between Ås and Finn Gustavsen over who would represent the party during the 1975 local elections. Gustavsen resigned as parliamentary leader, as early signs indicated that he did not have the full support of the party's Election Committee. The party, which suffered several aftershocks after its founding, was severely disorganized. Verdens Gang speculated that the current leadership would be replaced by a troika consisting of Furre (from the Socialist People's Party) as party chairman, Larsen (from the Communist Party) as parliamentary leader and Ås (from the Democratic Socialists – AIK) as deputy leader.

The establishment of the Socialist Left Party had several destabilising effects, such as weakening the party's voter base. Several opinion polls indicated that many voters were leaving, or thinking of leaving, the party or voting for the Labour Party in the 1977 election. As the power struggle between the left- and right-wing factions worsened, Steinar Stjernø was accused of trying to expel the party's social democratic wing (the right-wing faction). However, Sternjø called the rumours absurd. The reason for the accusation was that Stjernø wanted to create a "new and radical alternative for the Norwegian working class". By the time of the national convention where Ås stepped down as party chairwoman, the party had not succeeded in making itself a viable option for the common voter. Furre told the convention's delegates that the party would be able to win over voters, and take several from the Labour Party, if and when the internal situation stabilised. Another difficulty for the party, according to Furre, was that Odvar Nordli's Cabinet was moving the Labour Party further to the centre. It caused some controversy that two of the newly elected Members of Parliament had been convicted of treason for collaborating with the Nazis during World War II.

=== Electoral activities (1977–81) ===
Year	Vote %	Type
1977	4.2%	Parliament
1979	4.1% 4,4%	Municipal; County
1981	4.9%	Parliament

Believing that the Labour Party had moved further to the political centre, Furre commented that the Socialist Left Party could only support a left-oriented minority government. Labour Party Secretary Ivar Leveraas responded negatively to Furre's comment, saying "It isn't appropriate for the Labour Party to sit down together with the Socialist Left to discuss our political program and conditions for support, as Berge Furre requires."

Late in 1977, it was known that both Furre and Finn Gustavsen had revealed classified information during an open meeting in the People's House of Oslo on 22 August 1977, after threatening to do so. When this became known, the parliament established a Committee to investigate them. Not knowing what to do, representatives from the Odelstinget voted to shelve the case. There were 44 for and 47 against prosecuting them. When the result was made official, the media speculated that it was some kind of "punishment" of the party, since the incident proved that the party was unable to protect valuable information which could have jeopardized Norway's security interests.

After having what Verdens Gang described as a "disastrous election", in which the Socialist Left lost fourteen of their sixteen seats in the Storting, the party discussed changing its election platform. The platform, which had changed little since the 1973 election, was the centre of a power struggle, in which some Socialist Left Party members were calling for the removal of the peace paragraph (which called for the disbanding of the Norwegian military and the removal of foreign military bases located in Norway). Several leading party members opposed this paragraph. Furre and Gustavsen, both of whom came from the moderate camp, wanted to make the paragraph more moderate, and they succeeded at the 1977 national convention. In the aftermath of the election, Odvar Nordli, then the Labour Prime Minister, criticised the Socialist Left for being "capitalists" who supported right-wing policies, and further claimed that the Labour Party was the only remaining "anti-capitalist" alternative.

In the wake of the 1979 local elections, the internal struggle continued, and Verdens Gang claimed the situation inside the party was like a "civil war". When asked about the situation, Furre controversially claimed that there had never been so much stability within the party, considering that the main policy issues had been solved during the 1979 national convention. The party's electoral base became even smaller during the 1979 election, when it won 4.1% in the municipal and 4.4% in the county elections. At the national convention of 1983, the party was able to stabilise itself greatly. This national convention adopted socialism as the party's most important campaign promise during the election, with the majority of the delegates voting in favour. Hanna Kvanmo, parliamentary leader of the Socialist Left Party, claimed after the convention that, for the first time in the party's history, there was a "consensus in most areas". Furre was again reelected as party chairman, while Hilde Bojer and Torbjørn Dahl became the party's first and second deputy leader respectively. The Socialist Left Party was able to increase its voting share by 0.7 percentage points, from 4.2% to 4.9% nationwide, during the 1981 parliamentary election.

=== Resignation (1981–83) ===
Beginning in 1981, Party Secretary Erik Solheim became very critical of the party's left wing. He claimed that these radicals contributed nothing to the party and were more interested in being against everything than in supporting any policies. Writing for the party newspaper, Ny Tid, Solheim criticised the party's support for what he claimed to be extreme progressive taxation, and said he wanted to give the party a new public image. He also accused the party of having become conservative – objecting to change, for example – and claimed that there had not been any major changes to the party's policies since its establishment in 1975. Many members supported Solheim's criticism, and it led to renewed conflict between the right- and left-wing factions of the party. Several leading party officials agreed with Solheim's criticism. Furre, for example, shared several of his views and told the press that the party had discussed the same old topics ad nauseam for several years.

Furre announced his resignation as party chairman early in 1983. None of the leading party members of the time, most notably Hanna Kvanmo, Per Maurseth and Hilde Bojer, sought the party's chairmanship. Because of this Theo Koritzinsky was elected the party's new chairman at its 1983 national convention. The majority in the party's Election Committee had officially endorsed him beforehand.

== Theo Koritzinsky (1983–87) ==
=== Electoral success (1983–85) ===
Year	Vote %	Type
1983	5.1% 5.3%	Municipal; County
1985	5.5%	Parliament

At its 1983 national convention, the Socialist Left Party initiated an action plan that supported an increase in government spending on the elderly and addressed what they called "serious issues with the welfare state". Theo Koritzinsky wanted to increase the pension up to at least 40,000 and at most 50,000 Norwegian kroner. The action plan was heavily promoted, and Koritzinsky tried to collaborate with both the Labour Party and the Conservative Party to get it passed in the Storting. Another worry of Koritzinsky and the party was that, in their eyes, the public sector had begun to decay, which they feared would lead to increased unemployment within that sector.

During his campaign, Koritzinsky made a habit of campaigning outside the major cities. In an interview with the Norwegian News Agency, he expressed amazement at the support he was able to gather, and even claimed "renewed interest" in the party. While disappointed with the initial results in the 1983 local elections, he was pleased with the overall outcome of both the Socialist Left Party and the Labour Party. However, he was worried about the increased interest in right-wing parties, especially the Progress Party.

After the American invasion of Grenada, the party organised protests in Oslo against the war, during which Koritzinsky accused the political right of being slaves to the United States Government. Over 200,000 demonstrators attended the protests, and many Latin American interest groups were vocal in their support for the demonstrations. Koritzinsky criticised western diplomacy for condemning the Soviet Union, saying it was unfair that the First World only denounced military action when the Soviet Union or the communist bloc engaged in it, while remaining passive if the United States did so.

At the 1983 national convention, the majority of the delegates sought to collaborate with the Labour Party in the 1985 parliamentary elections. Gro Harlem Brundtland, the Labour chairwoman at the time, told the press that she was considering a proposal by the Socialist Left Party that the two parties make joint lists during the elections. In another press conference, Koritzinsky told the press that he was worried that, if an election pact was not established between the two parties, the "bourgeois right-wing parties" would create their own, and maybe even win the election if the left did not respond properly.

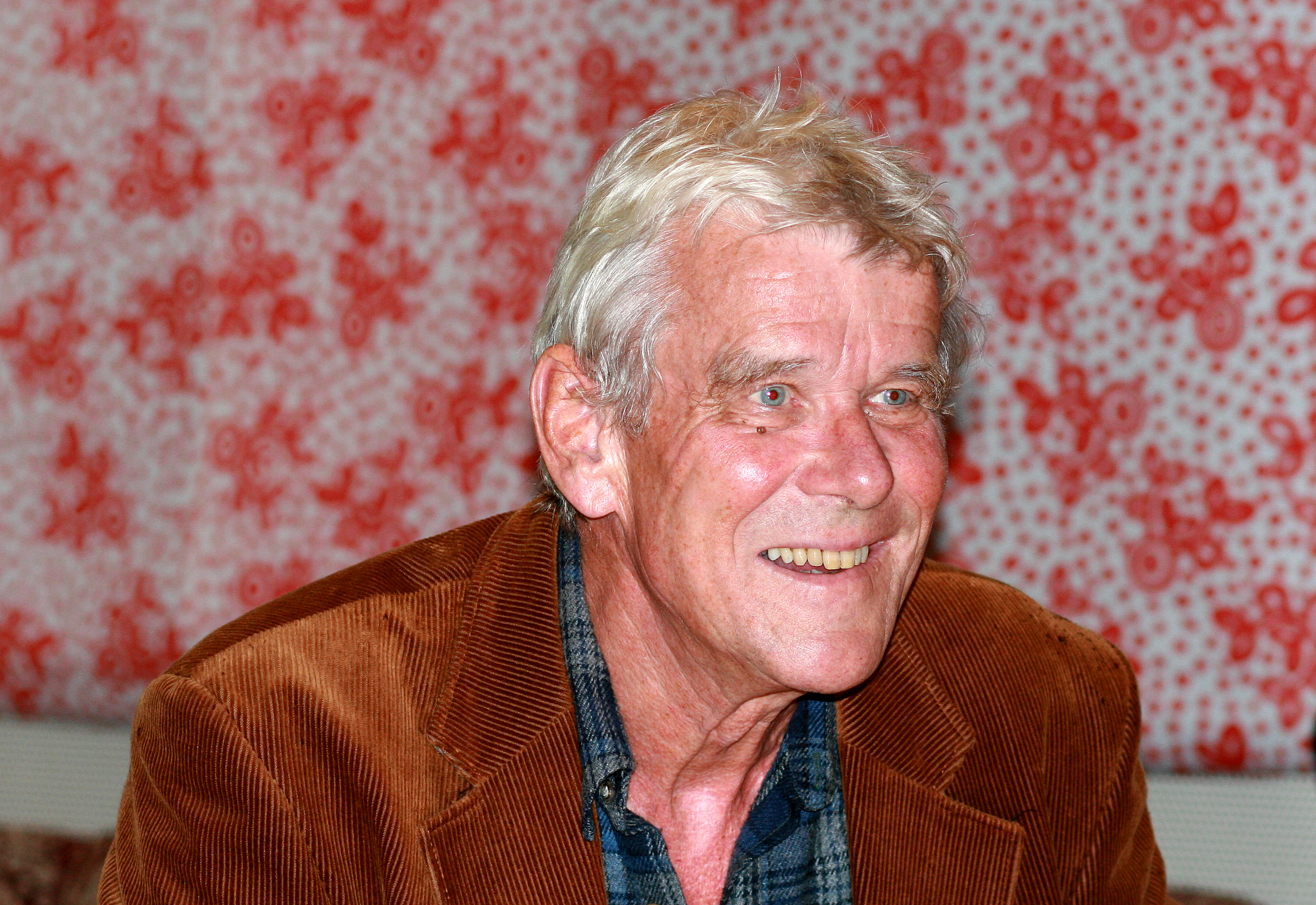
Theo Koritzinsky in Stavanger in 2008, after retiring from national politics

In 1984, Koritzinsky wanted party members who were teachers to leave local trade unions for the much larger Norwegian Confederation of Trade Unions (NCTU). He was not the only one promoting this idea: the Labour and Communist parties had done so for years. While supporting his original goal of enlarging the NCTU, Koritzinsky also recognized that there existed good reasons for teachers to work in traditional organisations – before being elected party chairman he was a member of a local trade union himself. On another subject, Koritzinsky favored a referendum on the question of arming Norway with nuclear weapons, or letting foreign powers position nuclear weapons on Norwegian soil.

When Stein Ørnhøi retired from active politics in 1984, Koritzinsky was seen as a likely candidate to replace him in the Storting, but it emerged that other party members were also interested in the Storting seat, most notably prominent Oslo city councillor Per Maurseth and veteran politician Finn Gustavsen. Early speculations were highly skeptical of Gustavsen's candidacy. The Socialist Left Party's Oslo nomination committee was split between Koritzinsky and Maurseth – they won 12 and 11 votes respectively, while Gustavsen won only one vote. As it turned out, Koritzinsky became the Socialist Left Party's first candidate for the Storting and Maurseth became the second, winning a contest against Kristin Halvorsen for second place. Gustavsen was not even on the list.

At the national convention of 1985, Koritzinsky told the delegates that

The voters accepted us as part of the labour movement a long time ago. This is proved by the fact that around one third of Labour voters consider the Socialist Left Party as their second voting preference. However, the Labour Party leadership has not accepted us a political force, and it is clear to us, and to them, that more voters will take us seriously if the Labour Party starts treating us with mutual respect. In it there is a political gain.

Kvanmo quickly corrected "in it there is a political gain" to "it may be a political gain". She further stated that the party's most realistic goal was not to collaborate with the Labour Party, but to increase the party's voter base to five or six percent. At the 1985 national convention, Koritzinsky wanted the party to promote itself as a "red-green alternative" to the Labour Party, an idea which had broad support within the Socialist Left. One month after the national convention, Koritzinsky visited West Germany with officials from the International Department of the Socialist Left Party to discuss green politics with members of the German Green Party.

In June 1985, the Socialist Left rejected an offer made jointly by the Communist Party, the Workers' Communist Party and the Red Electoral Alliance (the electoral organisation of the Workers' Communist Party) to establish an electoral coalition in the 1985 parliamentary elections. Instead, Koritzinsky continued with his plans to establish some sort of electoral collaboration with the Labour Party by encouraging all local party chapters to initiate formal contact with their Labour Party counterparts. However, the Labour Party still showed no great interest in a coalition; it neither accepted nor rejected Koritzinsky's offer. Koritzinsky vehemently opposed any notion that his party could collaborate with the Liberal Party, claiming that that party had chosen its own path – a path "to suffer a slow and beautiful death in Norwegian politics". Optimism within the party had been able to manifest itself in the weeks before the election, with Party Secretary Erik Solheim believing that the 1985 election could be the party's best election yet.

When the results were announced, Christian Democratic Party chairman Kjell Magne Bondevik told the press: "If the Labour Party had supported electoral reform, the socialists would have had a majority in the Storting". In response to Bondevik's statement, Koritzinsky said; "It is obvious that the lack of cooperation may have ruined the chances of a new socialist government", further claiming that he and his party had been open to cooperation with both the Liberal Party and Labour Party all along. Odd Einar Dørum, a Liberal Party member, also criticised the Labour Party's unwillingness to collaborate with other parties. Although there was no socialist majority in parliament, most Socialist Left members were pleased with the outcome, increasing their vote from 4.9% to 5.4% nationwide and gaining two more seats in parliament.

=== Leaving office (1985–87) ===
By the mid-1980s, several key party members wanted to move the party closer to the centre of Norwegian politics and make it a viable and open social democratic alternative on the left. Many supported the idea and believed it would expand the party's electoral base. According to Aftenposten, both Erik Solheim, leader of the party's right wing, and the ageing Finn Gustavsen, leader of its left wing, were likely candidates for the party chairmanship. On 27 August 1986, Koritzinsky announced in Dagbladet that he would step down as party chairman at the 1987 national convention. When asked why, he replied that he found it difficult to combine the chairmanship, his work in the Storting and the extensive travelling, which strained his family life. By August, Solheim and Tora Haug were the most likely candidates for the position, as Gustavsen had become editor-in-chief of Ny Tid, the party's newspaper.

During his tenure, Koritzinsky became a well-known and respected public figure, although several leading Socialist Left Party members were discontented with his leadership style, some even complaining that "he was not clever enough" to lead the party. In self-defense, Koritzinsky stated that he himself believed he had received criticism for his unusual working methods, explaining further that during his party chairmanship, he had been worried that leading members had concentrated much power in their own hands. At the 1986 national convention, the party again tried to improve its relations with the Labour Party, but this time, the Socialist Left Party would only collaborate with them if they moved more to the left. They were certain this could happen, considering that 39 percent of Labour Party members in a recent opinion poll said the Socialist Left Party was the second closest party to them in political views and policies.

The race between Solheim and Haug was close, so several members sought a compromise by trying to persuade Koritzinsky to extend his chairmanship two more years, until the next national convention. When this proved unfruitful, others tried to persuade Kvanmo to run for the chairmanship, but Kvanmo declined. On 2 March 1987 Solheim beat Haug and became the party's new chairman.

== Kristin Halvorsen (1997–2012) ==
=== Opposition (1997–2005) ===
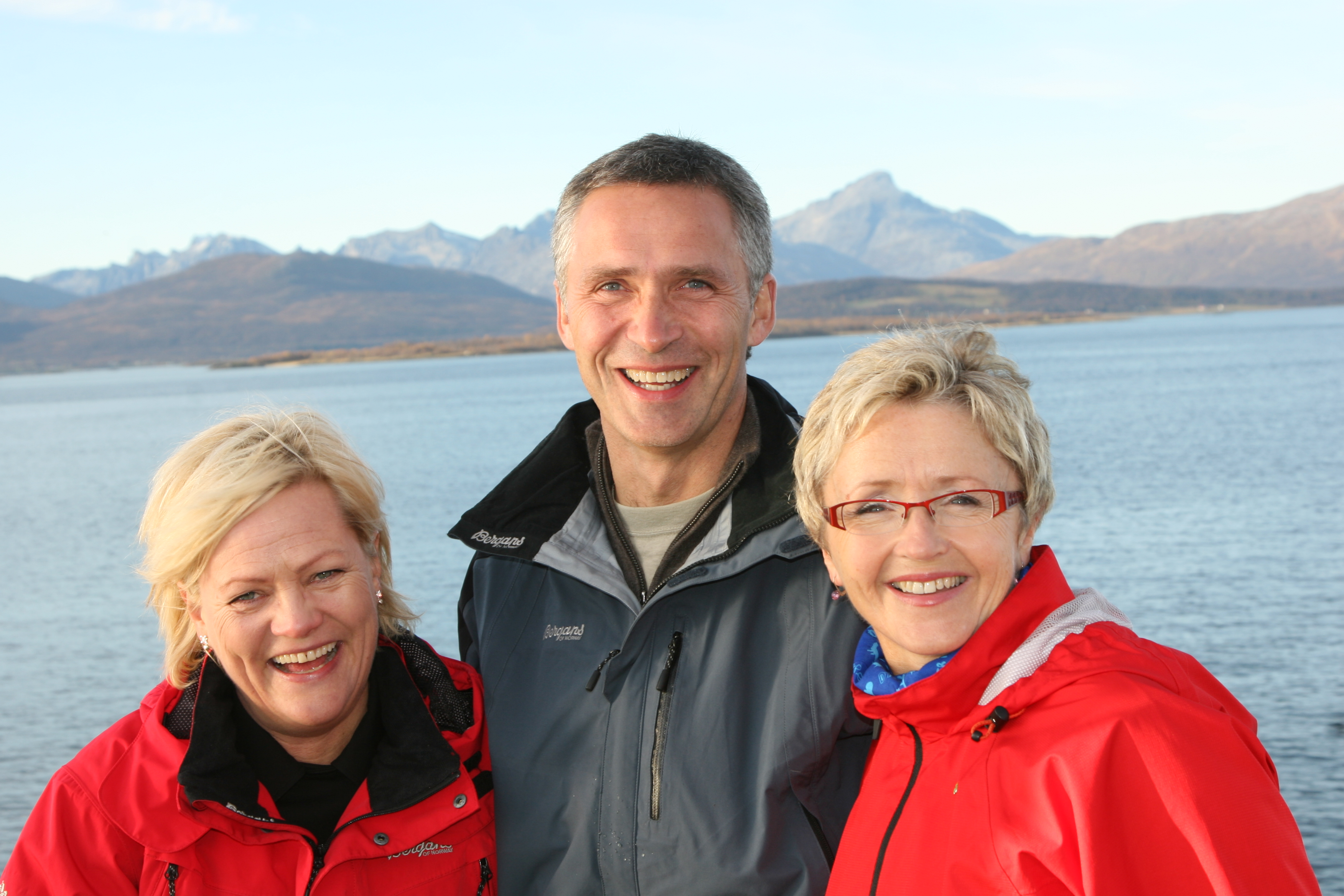
From left:Kristin Halvorsen (SV), Jens Stoltenberg (AP), Liv Signe Navarsete (Sp)

In spite of the belief expressed in the media that it would be close to impossible for the two parties to collaborate, the Socialist Left and the Labour Party managed to negotiate a tax settlement. This settlement was met with strong criticism from leading trade unionist Jan Davidsen of the Norwegian Confederation of Trade Unions, who claimed that higher taxes would help the municipalities and counties. The party later stated that the sitting government had weakened its position after handling Norway's national budget with the Progress Party.
