= Ingolf Håkon Teigene =

Norwegian journalist (1949–2007)

Ingolf Håkon Teigene (10 April 1949 – 12 June 2007) was a Norwegian journalist.

Teigene hailed from Hareid Municipality. He started his career as a journalist, and was editor-in-chief of Ny Tid from 1982 to 1986, at that time a newspaper owned by the Socialist Left Party. He also worked in Dagbladet.

Teigene then became known to the general public as a news presenter, anchoring in Dagsrevyen in the Norwegian Broadcasting Corporation. He appeared in this role for the first time in 1989. He also headed Sommeråpent and other programs.

Teigene also authored several books.

Teigene died at work, of heart failure.
