= Afghanaid =

Non-governmental organization

Afghanaid is an international humanitarian and development NGO that has worked alongside Afghan communities — currently including over one million adults and children — for over three decades. It was founded in the United Kingdom in 1983, following the Soviet Invasion of Afghanistan to provide emergency relief to those fleeing from Afghanistan to Pakistan and those in need of medical attention. Its work soon shifted from emergency aid to include community-focused long-term development. Its current work includes building basic services, improving livelihoods, strengthening the rights of women and children, helping communities protect against natural disasters, and respond to humanitarian emergencies. Afghanaid particularly targets vulnerable households in Afghanistan, including those headed by women, or with elderly, chronically ill or disabled family members.

Afghanaid's community-led approach aims to give ordinary Afghans a voice in their own development, making them active participants in shaping the future of their country.

Afghanaid employs approximately 400 staff - almost all Afghans. Almost 40 percent of its staff is female. A small London office provides support for its projects.

Some of Afghanaid's trustees are Mark Bowden (UN official), former United Nations Deputy Representative for Afghanistan, and Orzala Ashraf Nemat, an Afghan scholar and civil society activist.
