= Master suppression techniques =

Humiliation techniques

The master suppression techniques (in Norwegian: hersketeknikker) is a framework articulated in the late 1970s by Norwegian social psychologist Berit Ås. Building upon earlier work using the term hersketeknikker by Ingjald Nissen, Harriet Holter and others, Ås described five techniques for indirectly suppressing and humiliating opponents: making invisible, ridiculing, withholding information, double bind and shaming. Ås developed the framework in a feminist context as a practical tool for women to recognise and resist men's attempts to manipulate them, for example in political debates. The framework is now used more broadly in Scandinavian society, for example in discussions of mental health or workplace bullying.

Master suppression techniques are defined as strategies of social manipulation by which a dominant group maintains such a position in an (established or unexposed) hierarchy. They are very prominent in Scandinavian scholarly and public debate, where the expression is also used to refer to types of social manipulation not part of Ås's framework. Master suppression techniques are sometimes called domination techniques.

== The five master suppression techniques according to Ås ==
=== Making invisible ===
Silencing or otherwise marginalizing people in opposition by ignoring them.

Examples:

- A speaker claims ownership of an idea belonging to an opponent.
- When it is the opponent's turn to speak, other attendees start to talk to each other or browse through their papers to undermine what the opponent is saying.

=== Ridicule ===
Portraying the arguments of an opponent, or the opponents themselves, in a ridiculing fashion.

Example:

- Telling an opponent that they look cute when they are angry while they are trying to make an accusation of wrongdoing against someone.

=== Withholding information ===
Excluding a person from the decision-making process, or knowingly not forwarding information so as to make the person less able to make an informed choice.

Examples:

- Not including someone in a meeting about a matter that concerns them.
- Decisions are made not in a conference where everyone is present, but at a dinner party later in the evening where only some attendants have been invited.

=== Double bind ===
Punishing, blaming or otherwise belittling the actions of an opponent, regardless of how they act.

Example:

- Despite doing tasks thoroughly, the opponent receives complaints for being too slow. When tasks are done efficiently, the opponent receives complaints of being sloppy.

=== Heaping blame/putting to shame ===
Embarrassing someone or insinuating that they themselves are to blame for their position.

Example:

- When raising concerns about being slandered, the opponent is told that it is their fault since they (for example) dress provocatively.

== Later additions by Ås ==
Berit Ås has since added two supplementary master suppression techniques.

=== Objectifying ===
Discussing the appearance of one or several persons in a situation where it is irrelevant.

=== Force/threat of force ===
Threatening with or using one's physical strength towards one or several persons.

Example:

- "One more word from you and I'll smash your face!"

== Countermeasures against master suppression techniques ==
A group of PhD students at Stockholm University has formulated five counter strategies:

- Take place
- Questioning
- The cards on the table
- Break the pattern
- Intellectualise

They have also formulated five confirmation techniques:

- Visualizing
- Adherence
- Inform
- Double reward
- Confirm reasonable standards

The Centre for Gender Equality in Norway has also published an article about how to combat this phenomenon.

== See also ==
- Psychological manipulation
