= 1963 Norwegian local elections =

== Result of municipal elections ==
Results of the 1963 municipal elections.

Party	Votes	%	Seats
Labour Party	870,425	45.78	6,274
Centre Party	156,169	8.21	1,687
Conservative Party	376,792	19.82	1,675
Upolitiske, lokale og andre lister	89,788	4.72	1,491
Liberal Party	158,735	8.35	1,214
Christian Democratic Party	129,603	6.82	1,007
Borgerlige felleslister	23,267	1.22	425
Socialist People's Party	53,355	2.81	183
Communist Party	35,886	1.89	161
Småbrukere, arbeidere og fiskere	7,094	0.37	96
Total	1,901,114	100.00	14,213
Registered voters/turnout	2,363,011	–	
Source: Élections en 1963 pour les conseils communaux et municipaux
