= 1967 Norwegian local elections =

== Result of municipal elections ==
Results of the 1967 municipal elections.

Party	Votes	%
Labour Party		43.8
Conservative Party		19.3
Liberal Party		9.8
Centre Party		9.3
Christian Democratic Party		7.1
Socialist People's Party		5.1
Communist Party		1.2
Others		4.4
Total		
