= Mark Bowden (UN official) =

British UN official

Mark Rainer Bowden CMG was the United Nations Deputy Special Representative for Afghanistan from September 2012 until February 2017.

== Career ==
Bowden worked in many fields, including humanitarian coordination in conflict and post-conflict countries, development and recovery assistance. Prior to his current appointment, he had been United Nations Resident Coordinator and Humanitarian Coordinator for Somalia.

Previously, he worked as Director of Civil Affairs in the United Nations Mission in Sudan (UNMIS). He served as Conflict Management Adviser for Africa in the Foreign and Commonwealth Office of the United Kingdom from 1999 to 2001.

Prior to that, he worked as Country Director in Bangladesh and Head of Regional Office for East Africa and Africa Director at Save the Children Fund.

He was appointed Companion of the Order of St Michael and St George (CMG) in the 2017 Birthday Honours.

He is a trustee for the British NGO Afghanaid.

== Personal ==
Bowden was born in 1951 and has two daughters. He obtained a B.A. in psychology and economics from Brunel University.
