= Information Committee of the Labour Movement against Norwegian membership in the European Community =

Information Committee of the Labour Movement against Norwegian membership in the European Community (in Norwegian: Arbeiderbevegelsens informasjonskomité mot norsk medlemskap i EF, abbreviated AIK) was an internal organized opposition within the Norwegian Labour Party. AIK was founded in January 1972, ahead of the plebiscite on joining the European Economic Community. The appeal to found AIK came from Workers' Youth League and some trade unions. Its activities were financed by donations from trade union organizations and individuals. AIK had an office in Oslo. AIK was led by Bernt H. Lund.

Following the plebiscite, which was won by the 'No'-line, the national conference of AIK decided that its first priority would be to ensure nominations of anti-EEC candidates on the lists of the Labour Party. Ole Wiig was elected leader of AIK. However, a second national conference was held in March 1973. That conference decided that AIK should break with the Labour Party and constitute itself as a political party. Berit Ås was elected the leader of AIK. Deputy leader was Ole Wiig. AIK then went on to registered itself as Democratic Socialists – AIK (Demokratiske Sosialister – AIK). The party joined the Socialist Electoral League (SV). When SV was converted into the Socialist Left Party in 1975, AIK was incorporated into it.
