= Ireland Front =

Irlandsfronten (the 'Ireland Front') was a Norwegian association for supporting the cause of Irish republicanism. The organization existed from 1972 to 1982.

Politically Irlandsfronten was dominated by people from the Socialist Left Party whereas its competitor, Irlandskomiteen was connected to the Workers Communist Party (Marxist–Leninist). In November 1982, the two groups merged and formed the United Ireland Committee.

As unveiled by the Lund commission, the organization was put under surveillance by Norwegian security police, as its members and leaders were considered as potential terrorists.
