= 1971 Norwegian local elections =

== Result of municipal elections ==
Results of the 1971 municipal elections.

Party	Votes	%
Labour Party		41.7
Conservative Party		17.9
Centre Party		11.5
Christian Democratic Party		8.7
Liberal Party		8.5
Socialist People's Party		4.0
Communist Party		0.7
Others		7.0
Total		
