= 1973 Norwegian parliamentary election =

- 9-10 September 1973

All 155 seats in the Storting 78 seats needed for a majority
- Turnout: 80.2%
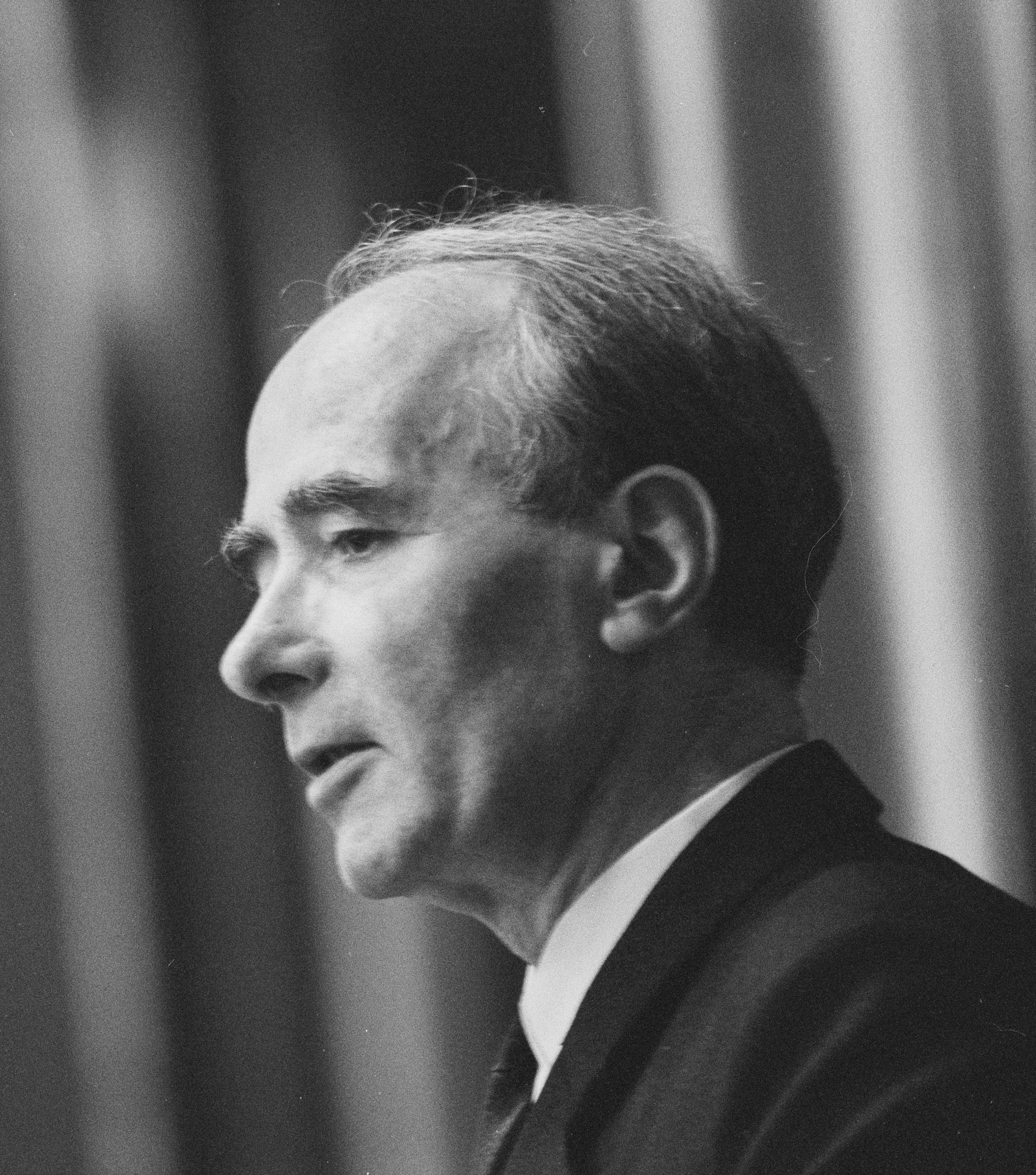

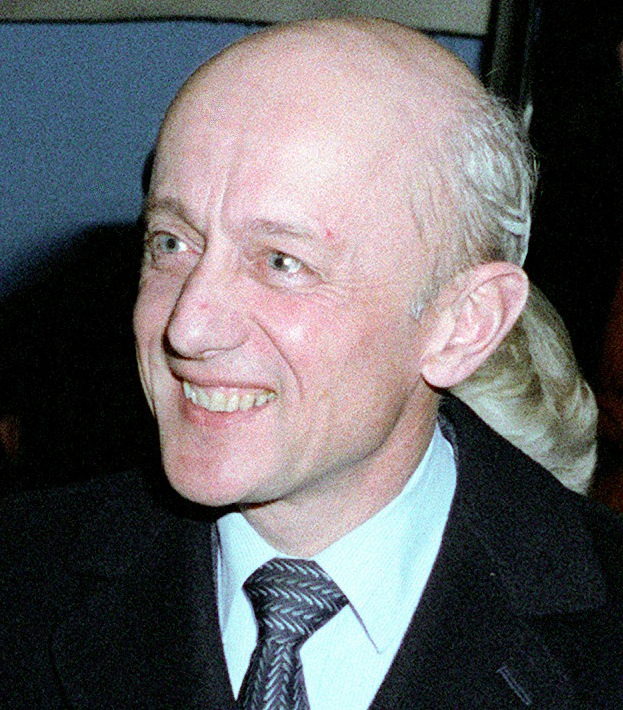

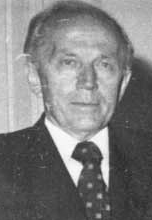

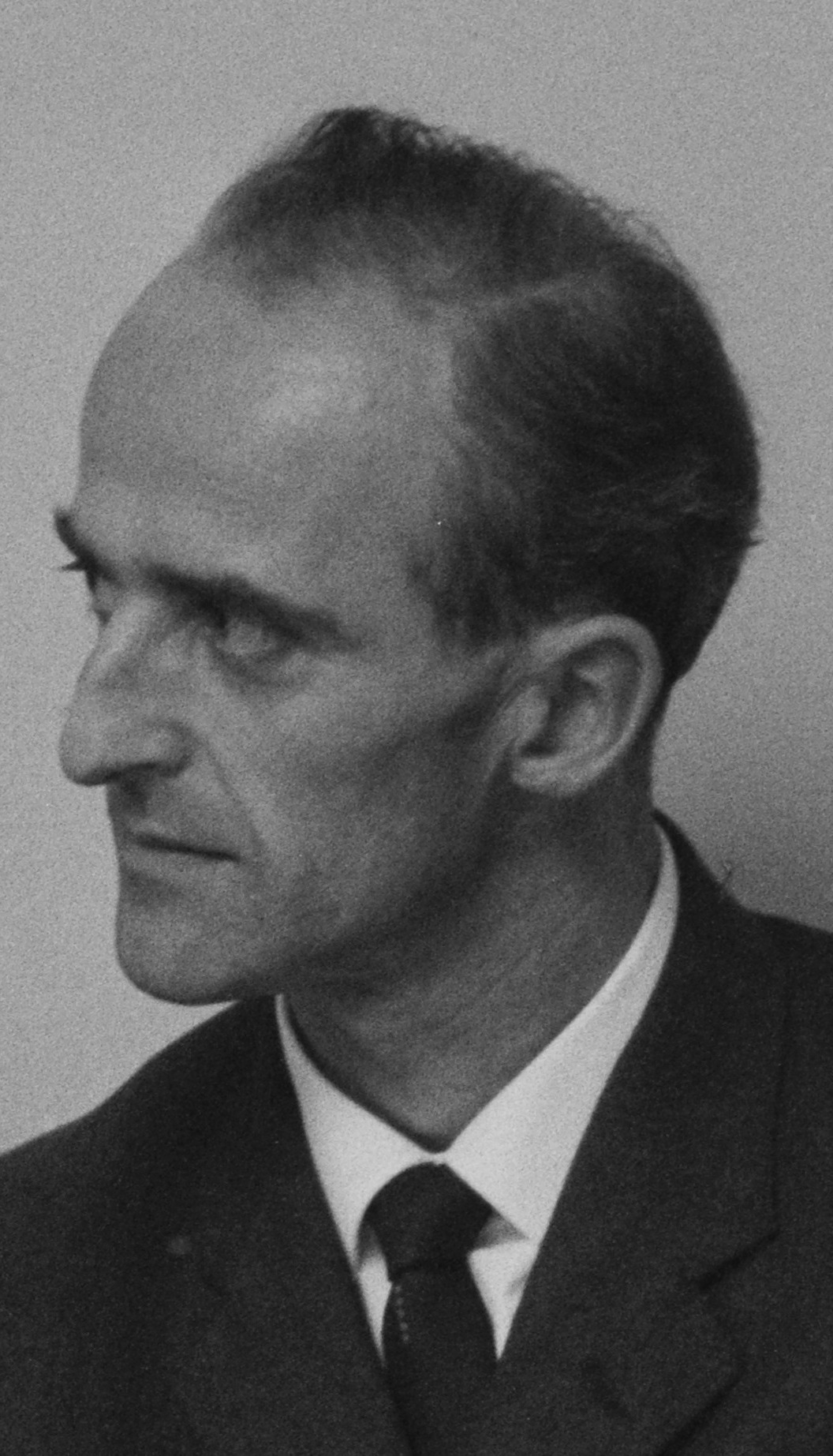

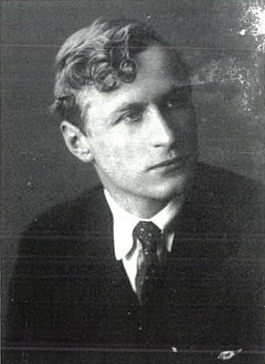

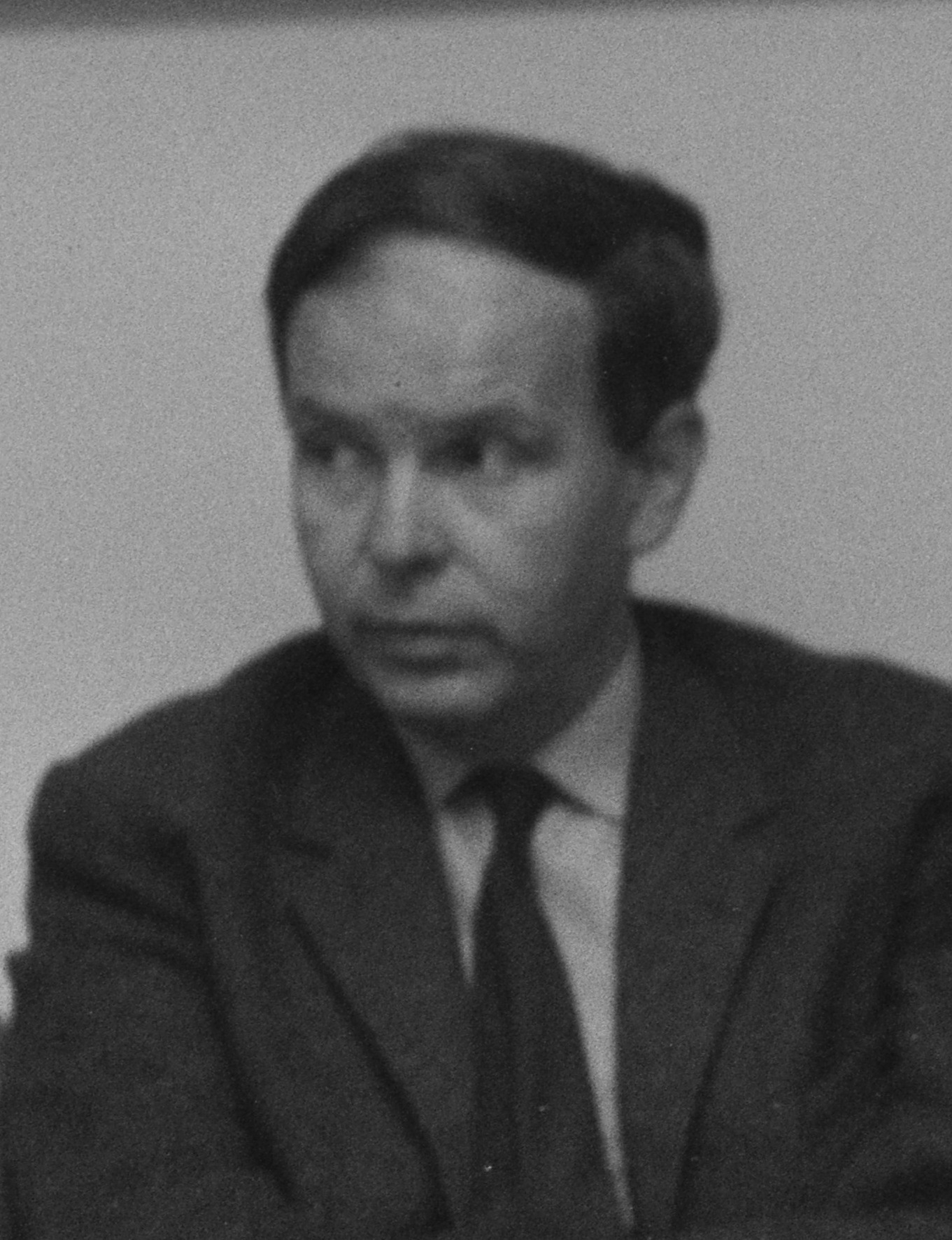
	First party	Second party	Third party
Leader	Trygve Bratteli	Kåre Willoch	Dagfinn Vårvik
Party	Labour	Conservative	Centre
Last election	46.5%, 74 seats	22.7%, 29 seats	12.9%, 20 seats
Seats won	62	29	21
Seat change	▼12	Steady	▲1
Popular vote	759,499	379,039^{[c]}	265,734^{[a]}^{[b]}
Percentage	35.3%	17.6%^{[c]}	12.3%^{[a]}^{[b]}
Swing	▼11.2pp	▼5.1pp	▼0.6pp
	Fourth party	Fifth party	Sixth party
Leader	Lars Korvald	Finn Gustavsen	Anders Lange
Party	Christian; Democratic	Socialist	Anders Lange's
Last election	11.7%, 14 seats	4.4%, 0 seats^{[d]}	–
Seats won	20	16	4
Seat change	▲6	▲16	New
Popular vote	285,908^{[b]}^{[c]}	241,851	107,784
Percentage	13.3%^{[b]}^{[c]}	11.2%	5.0%
Swing	▲1.6pp	▲6.8pp	New
	Seventh party	Eighth party
Leader	Helge Rognlien	Helge Seip
Party	Liberal	New People's
Last election	9.4%, 13 seats	–
Seats won	2	1
Seat change	▼11	New
Popular vote	169,090^{[a]}^{[b]}	73,854
Percentage	7.8%^{[a]}^{[b]}.	3.4%
Swing	▼1.6pp	New
- Largest bloc and seats won by constituency
Prime Minister before election
Lars Korvald
Christian Democratic
Prime Minister after election
Trygve Bratteli
Labour

Parliamentary elections were held in Norway on 9 and 10 September 1973. The Labour Party remained the largest party, winning 62 of the 155 seats in the Storting.

== Contesting parties ==
Name		Ideology	Position	Leader	1969 result	
Name		Ideology	Position	Leader	Votes (%)	Seats
Ap	Labour Party; Arbeiderpartiet	Social democracy	Centre-left	Trygve Bratteli	46.5%	74 / 155
H	Conservative Party; Høyre	Conservatism	Centre-right	Kåre Willoch	18.8%	29 / 155
V	Liberal Party; Venstre	Social liberalism	Centre	Helge Rognlien	9.3%	13 / 155
Sp	Centre Party; Senterpartiet	Agrarianism	Centre	Dagfinn Vårvik	8.9%	20 / 155
KrF	Christian Democratic Party; Kristelig Folkeparti	Christian democracy	Centre to centre-right	Lars Korvald	7.8%	14 / 155
SV	Socialist Electoral League; Sosialistisk Valgforbund	Socialism; Democratic socialism Communism	Left-wing and Far-left	Finn Gustavsen	3.3%	1 / 155
NKP	Communist Party of Norway; Norges Kommunistiske Parti	Communism	Far-left	Martin Gunnar Knutsen	1.0%	0 / 155

== Campaign ==
=== Slogans ===
Party	Original slogan	English translation
Labour Party	"Vekst og vern - demokrati og likestilling"	"Growth and protection - democracy and equality"
Conservative Party		
Centre Party		
Christian Democratic Party		
Liberal Party		
Communist Party of Norway		

=== Debates ===
1973 Norwegian general election debates
Date	Organisers	P Present I Invitee N Non-invitee									
Date	Organisers	Ap	H	V	Sp	KrF	SF	ALP	Dlp	Rv	Refs
4 September	NRK	N	P Kaare Meland	N	N	N	N	P Anders Lange	N	N	
6 September	NRK	P Trygve Bratteli, Reiulf Steen	P Kåre Willoch	P Helge Rognlien	P Dagfinn Vårvik	P Asbjørn Haugstvedt, Lars Korvald	P Finn Gustavsen	P Anders Lange	P Helge Seip	P Sigurd Allern	

1. Politisk kvarter with Anders lange
2. Politisk kvarter with Berit Ås og Ragnar Kalheim

== Opinion polls ==
Polling firm	Fieldwork date	Sample size	NKP	AKP	SF	Ap	Sp	V	DLF	KrF	H	ALP	Others	Lead
1973 election	9 and 10 September 1973	–			11.2%	35.3%	12.3%	7.8%	3.4%	13.3%	17.6%	5.0%		
Norsk Gallup	September 1973	–	–	0.9	13.9	31.9	10.3	2.9	2.8	11.8	19.9	4.4		
Norsk Gallup	Aug 1973	–	–	0.5	8.5	39.7	12.2	4	3.9	9.3	16.9	4.7		
Norsk Gallup	July 1973	–	–	–	8.2	39.7	11.1	3.4	3.5	9.9	17.3	5.9		
Norsk Gallup	June 1973	–	–	0.5	9.8	38.7	12.8	3.5	4	9.4	17.2	4.2		
Norsk Gallup	May 1973	–	1.1	0.1	6.6	39.1	11.3	3.5	3.8	9.7	19.6	5.4		
ALP was founded on 8 April 1973
Norsk Gallup	April 1973	–	1.1	0.8	7.4	40.2	11.5	3.3	5.4	8	22.3	–		
Norsk Gallup	March 1973	–	1.1	0.4	7.6	43	9.7	3.3	6.6	6.6	21.7	–		
Norsk Gallup	February 1973	–	1.1	–	6.4	41.7	10.9	2.4	5.4	8	24.1	–		
Norsk Gallup	January 1973	–	1.2	–	6.8	43.6	12.9	3.1	4.4	7.8	20.1	–		
Norsk Gallup	December 1972	–	1.3	–	6.6	44.9	12.2	3.5	3.5	9.1	19	–		
Norsk Gallup	November 1972	–	1.7	–	6.8	47.1	13.2	4.2	–	8.9	18.1	–		
Norsk Gallup	October 1972	–	1.7	–	5.9	48.1	13.3	5.5	–	6.5	18.9	–		
Norsk Gallup	September 1972	–	1	–	6.6	42.3	14.9	7.2	–	6.7	21.4	–		
Norsk Gallup	August 1972	–	1.6	–	7.4	44.2	11.1	8.1	–	9.1	18.6	–		
Norsk Gallup	July 1972	–	1.4	–	6.4	44.2	10.7	7.3	–	8.8	21.2	–		
Norsk Gallup	June 1972	–	1.6	–	7.3	49.2	12.7	6.4	–	6.8	16	–		
Norsk Gallup	May 1972	–	1.6	–	6.7	46.4	11.8	7.8	–	6.7	19	–		
Norsk Gallup	April 1972	–	1.8	–	6.6	43.6	14.2	7.4	–	7.6	18.7	–		
Norsk Gallup	March 1972	–	1.1	–	6.9	44.7	13	7.5	–	7.5	19.3	–		
Norsk Gallup	February 1972	–	1.3	–	6.6	43.3	13.6	9.1	–	7.5	18.6	–		
Norsk Gallup	January 1972	–	0.9	–	6.6	44.5	15.9	6.9	–	7.9	17.2	–		
Norsk Gallup	December 1971	–	0.7	–	8.1	47.2	13.4	6.3	–	7.9	16.5	–		
Norsk Gallup	November 1971	–	0.8	–	6.1	44.8	13.9	7.9	–	9.8	16.6	–		
Norsk Gallup	October 1971	–	1.2	–	6.7	44.1	13	9	–	7.4	18.6	–		
Norsk Gallup	September 1971	–	1.2	–	6.8	44.2	12.9	9	–	7.2	18.6	–		
Norsk Gallup	August 1971	–	0.5	–	5	50.6	10.1	8.8	–	7.5	17.5	–		
Norsk Gallup	July 1971	–	1.2	–	3.9	51.1	11.4	7.3	–	6.4	18.7	–		
Norsk Gallup	June 1971	–	0.9	–	3.6	52.3	12.1	5.6	–	6.9	18.5	–		
Norsk Gallup	May 1971	–	1.3	–	2.7	56.2	13.5	5.1	–	7.5	13.8	–		
Norsk Gallup	April 1971	–	0.8	–	2.9	54.6	12.7	6.5	–	9	13.5	–		
Norsk Gallup	March 1971	–	0.8	–	2.6	56.4	11	7.1	–	7.8	14.4	–		
Norsk Gallup	February 1971	–	1.3	–	2.8	51	12.5	7.5	–	7.9	16.9	–		
Norsk Gallup	January 1971	–	0.5	–	2.7	56.7	11.7	5.9	–	7.5	14.9	–		
Norsk Gallup	December 1970	–	0.6	–	2.4	58.7	8.1	5.8	–	8.2	16.2	–		
Norsk Gallup	November 1970	–	0.6	–	2.1	57.6	7.6	6.6	–	8.9	16.6	–		
Norsk Gallup	October 1970	–	0.9	–	2.2	57.7	9.8	6.3	–	7.7	15.4	–		
Norsk Gallup	September 1970	–	0.8	–	1.9	57.3	10.4	6	–	7.9	15.8	–		
Norsk Gallup	August 1970	–	0.4	–	6.8	57.3	8.3	8.8	–	1.1	17.3	–		
Norsk Gallup	July 1970	–	0.8	–	2.9	53	8.7	8.9	–	7	18.6	–		
Norsk Gallup	June 1970	–	1	–	1.7	54.4	9.5	7.1	–	8.3	17.9	–		
Norsk Gallup	May 1970	–	0.8	–	1.9	59	7.5	6.7	–	7.9	16.2	–		
Norsk Gallup	April 1970	–	0.8	–	2.3	53.9	8.9	6.9	–	9.6	17.4	–		
Norsk Gallup	March 1970	–	1.1	–	1.5	60.3	7.6	6	–	7.6	15.9	–		
Norsk Gallup	February 1970		1.1	–	2.5	54.7	7	7.1	–	6.4	21.3	–		
Norsk Gallup	January 1970	–	0.9	–	2.1	59.5	8	5.8	–	8.8	14.8	–		
Norsk Gallup	December 1969	–	1.4	–	3.3	52.9	9.7	6.6	–	8.8	17.3	–		
Norsk Gallup	November 1969	–	0.6	–	3.6	53.3	9.6	7.4	–	8	17.5	–		
Norsk Gallup	October 1969	–	0.7	–	1.7	55.9	10	6.6	–	8.8	16.3	–		
	7 and 8 September 1969	–		–	3..9%	46.5%	12.9%	9.4%	–	11.7%	22.7%	–		

== Results ==
Party	Votes	%	Seats	+/–
Labour Party	759,499	35.29	62	–12
Conservative Party	370,370	17.21	29	0
Christian Democratic Party	255,456	11.87	19	+6
Socialist Electoral League	241,851	11.24	16	+16
Centre Party	146,312	6.80	13	+1
Anders Lange's Party	107,784	5.01	4	New
Centrists–Liberals (Note: The joint list of the Centre Party and the Liberal Party won seven seats, six taken by the Centre Party and one by the Liberal Party.)	97,639	4.54	7	–
New People's Party	73,854	3.43	1	New
Liberal Party	49,668	2.31	1	–11
Centrists–Liberals–Christians (Note: The joint list of the Centre Party, Liberal Party and the Christian Democratic Party won three seats, two taken by the Centre Party and one by the Christian Democratic Party.)	21,783	1.01	3	–
Red Electoral Alliance	9,360	0.43	0	New
Conservatives–Christians	8,669	0.40	0	–
Single Person's Party	5,113	0.24	0	New
Democratic Party	2,125	0.10	0	0
Women's Free Deputies	1,866	0.09	0	New
Lapp People's List	849	0.04	0	0
Other parties	6	0.00	0	–
Total	2,152,204	100.00	155	+5
Valid votes	2,152,204	99.84		
Invalid/blank votes	3,530	0.16		
Total votes	2,155,734	100.00		
Registered voters/turnout	2,686,676	80.24		
Source: Nohlen & Stöver

=== Voter demographics ===
Cohort	Percentage of cohort voting for							
Cohort	Ap	H	KrF	Sp	SF	V	ALP	Others
Total vote	35.3%	17.6%	13.3%	12.3%	11.2%	2.3%	5.0%	
Gender
Females	39.3%	18.3%	16.4%	6.3%	7.8%	2.1%	2.9%	
Males	32.4%	16.6%	8.4%	7.2%	14%	2.3%	6.9%	
Age
18–30 years old	30.4%	14.4%	10.4%	6.4%	17.6%	1.6%	12%	
30-59 years old	36.8%	15.7%	9.4%	6.9%	12.8%	2.2%	4.2%	
60 years old and older	35%	22.2%	18.2%	7.1%	5.1%	3%	3.4%	
Work
low income	35.6%	11.7%	22.3%	11%	9.5%	3%	4.5%	
Average income	39.6%	11%	11.9%	6.2%	14.3%	2.9%	4.1%	
High income	30.4%	27.7%	4.8%	4.3%	9.7%	1.1%	6.5%	
Education
Primary school	56%	5.9%	12.7%	5.9%	12.7%	2.3%	1.6%	
High school	32.5%	14.8%	13.2%	8%	11.5%	2.4%	5.6%	
University/college	11.1%	43.7%	6.8%	4.7%	8.4%	2.1%	8.9%	
Source: Norwegian Institute for Social Research

=== Seat distribution ===
Constituency	Total seats	Seats won							
Constituency	Total seats	Ap	H	Sp	KrF	SV	ALp	V	DNF
Akershus	10	3	3	1	1	1	1		
Aust-Agder	4	2	1		1				
Buskerud	7	3	2	1		1			
Finnmark	4	2	1			1			
Hedmark	8	4	1	2		1			
Hordaland	15	5	3	1	3	1	1		1
Møre og Romsdal	10	3	1	2	2	1		1	
Nord-Trøndelag	6	3		2	1				
Nordland	12	5	1	2	2	2			
Oppland	7	4	1	2					
Oslo	15	6	5		1	2	1		
Østfold	8	4	1	1	1	1			
Rogaland	10	3	2	1	2	1	1		
Sogn og Fjordane	5	2		2	1				
Sør-Trøndelag	10	4	2	1	1	2			
Telemark	6	2	1		1	1		1	
Troms	6	2	1	1	1	1			
Vest-Agder	5	2	1	1	1				
Vestfold	7	3	2	1	1				
Total	155	62	29	21	20	16	4	2	1
Source: Norges Offisielle Statistikk
