= Knut Løfsnes =

Norwegian resistance member, politician and lawyer

- Born: 22 December 1918; Namsos, Norway
- Died: 5 January 1996 (aged 77); Bærum
- Occupations: Lawyer and politician

Knut Ingolf Løfsnes (22 December 1918 – 5 January 1996) was a Norwegian resistance member, politician and lawyer. He was a central leader of the clandestine organization XU during the occupation of Norway by Nazi Germany, leading the mid-Norway XU department from the Norwegian legation in Stockholm from 1942 to 1945. He was the first chairman of the Socialist People's Party, from 1961 to 1969.

== Early life and World War II ==
He was born in Namsos as a son of a sawmill worker. He finished secondary education at Trondheim Cathedral School in 1938, and worked as a teacher in other towns. At the time of the Namsos Campaign, a part of World War II fighting in 1940, he returned home. The Allied forces eventually lost the Namsos Campaign, Germany occupied Norway and Løfsnes joined the Norwegian resistance movement. He was arrested in 1942, was imprisoned in Falstad concentration camp from June to July 1942, was released and fled to Sweden in the same year. Here he led the mid-Norway department of the clandestine organization XU from the Norwegian legation in Stockholm from 1942 to 1945. He was decorated with the King Christian X's Liberty Medal contributing to the organization and funding of the rescue of 7220 Danish Jews to Sweden and the Norwegian Defence Medal 1940–1945. In November 1945 he married Eva Marie Linge (1924–2010).

== Post-war career and life ==
In 1945 he worked in the military for some months and then for the Oslo police for a short time, but he was fired. It has been said that he was fired for political reasons. He instead started studying law, graduating with the cand.jur. degree in 1949. He worked with administration of services to the Norwegian merchant fleet, and also wrote for newspapers. He was a commentator in Arbeiderbladet from 1949 to 1953, and from 1953 in Orientering. He was a member of the Norwegian Labour Party, but was excluded around 1960–1961 together with the rest of Orientering's staff. He was then a co-founder and the first chairman of the Socialist People's Party, from 1961 to 1969. From 1964 to 1969 his job was as secretary for the parliamentary group.

He was a junior solicitor from 1969 to 1972 and a lawyer from 1972 to 1985. In 1991 he published Motstandsmann og politiker. Fra XU til SF og Kings Bay with Bjørn Bjørnsen.

He lived at Kolsås in his later life. He died in January 1996 in Bærum. Shortly after his death, the Lund Commission found that Løfsnes had been subject to widespread political surveillance by the Norwegian Police Surveillance Agency. The Police Surveillance Agency had collected at least 2500 pages of surveillance documents, and in 2001 his family received a monetary compensation.
