= Ingjald Nissen =

Norwegian psychologist and philosopher (1896–1977)

- Born: 2 September 1896; Kristiania, Norway
- Died: 25 February 1977 (aged 80); Bærum
- Education: Psychology, philosophy, sociology
- Occupations: Psychoanalyst, non-fiction writer

Ingjald Nissen (2 September 1896, Kristiania – 25 February 1977, Bærum) was a Norwegian psychologist and philosopher.

Nissen published around twenty books, and was a government scholar from 1938. His books treated a number of fundamental human questions such as sexuality, mass psychology, power hunger and the feeling of guilt. His most popular book was Psykopatenes diktatur from 1945, an effort to discuss the German catastrophe. He was a member of the Norwegian Association for Women's Rights.

== See also ==
- Master suppression techniques
