= Orzala Ashraf Nemat =

Afghan scholar and civil society activist

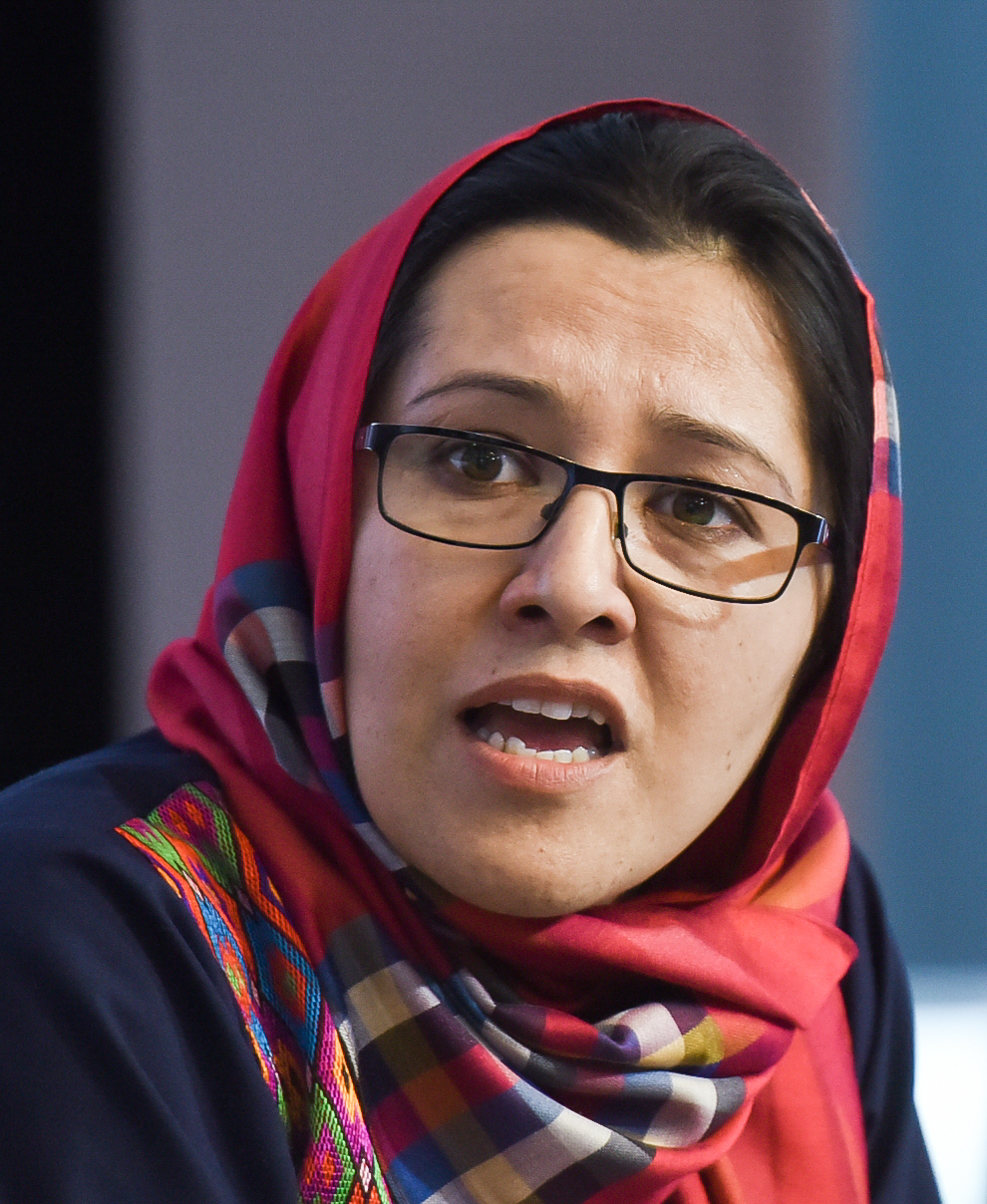
- Orzala Ashraf Nemat in 2016
- Education: SOAS, University of London

Orzala Ashraf Nemat (Dari: اورزاله اشرف نعمت) is an Afghan scholar and civil society activist. She established the Women and Youth Leadership Centre in 2012. Orzala got her Phd from School of SOAS, University of London in Law and Political Science. During Afghanistan's Taliban Government she put herself many times directly at risk and launched underground literacy and health education programs for women and girls. Orzala published several articles in greater news sources, like the BBC and the Guardian.

Nemat is a trustee of Afghanaid and she has earned a world fellows scholarship.

She was recognized as one of the BBC's 100 women of 2013.
