= Socialist People's Party (Norway) =

Socialist People's Party Sosialistisk Folkeparti
- Founded: 16 April 1961
- Dissolved: 30 April 1976
- Split from: Labour Party
- Merged into: Socialist Left Party
- Youth wing: Socialist Youth League (1963–69); Socialist People's Youth (from 1969)
- Ideology: Socialism; Popular socialism Euroscepticism
- Political position: Left-wing
- National affiliation: Socialist Electoral League (1973–75)

The Socialist People's Party (Norwegian: Sosialistisk Folkeparti) was a splinter group of the Norwegian Labour Party (DNA) founded in 1961. SF was principally dissatisfied with the pro-NATO/European Economic Community external policies of DNA. A group centered on the magazine Orientering had been expelled from DNA. The party merged into the Socialist Left Party in 1976.

== History ==
In the mid-1960s, the youth organization of SF, Socialist Youth League (Sosialistisk Ungdomsfylking), started moving towards revolutionary Marxism, leading to a split in 1969. The SUF broke away, renamed itself SUF(m-l) and launched the Workers' Communist Party (Marxist–Leninist) (which merged with the Red Electoral Alliance in 2007 to launch the new Red Party).

Following the split, Socialist People's Youth (Sosialistisk Folkepartis Ungdom) became the new SF youth wing. SF lost parliamentary representation in 1969; however, in 1972 a DNA MP, Arne Kielland, joined SF.

SF was the driving force behind the formation of Socialist Electoral League, which later emerged into Socialist Left Party. SV can be seen as the direct successor of the SF.

== SF party leaders ==
- 1961-1969 : Knut Løfsnes
- 1969-1971 : Torolv Solheim
- 1971-1973 : Finn Gustavsen
- 1973-1975 : Stein Ørnhøi

== Electoral results ==
=== Parliamentary elections ===
Storting
Date	Votes			Seats		Position	Size
Date	No.	%	± pp	No.	±	Position	Size
1961	43,996	2.4	New	2 / 150	New	Support (1961–1963)	8th
1961	43,996	2.4	New	2 / 150	New	Opposition (1963)	8th
1961	43,996	2.4	New	2 / 150	New	Support (from 1963)	8th
1965	122,721	6.0	▲3.5	2 / 150	2	Opposition	▲6th
1969	73,284	3.4	▼2.6	0 / 150	▼2	Extra-parliamentary	▼6th
1973				13 / 155	▲13	Support	▲5th

Local
Year	Vote %	Type
1963	2.8	Municipal
1967	5.1	Municipal
1971	4.0	Municipal
