= Finn Gustavsen =

Norwegian politician

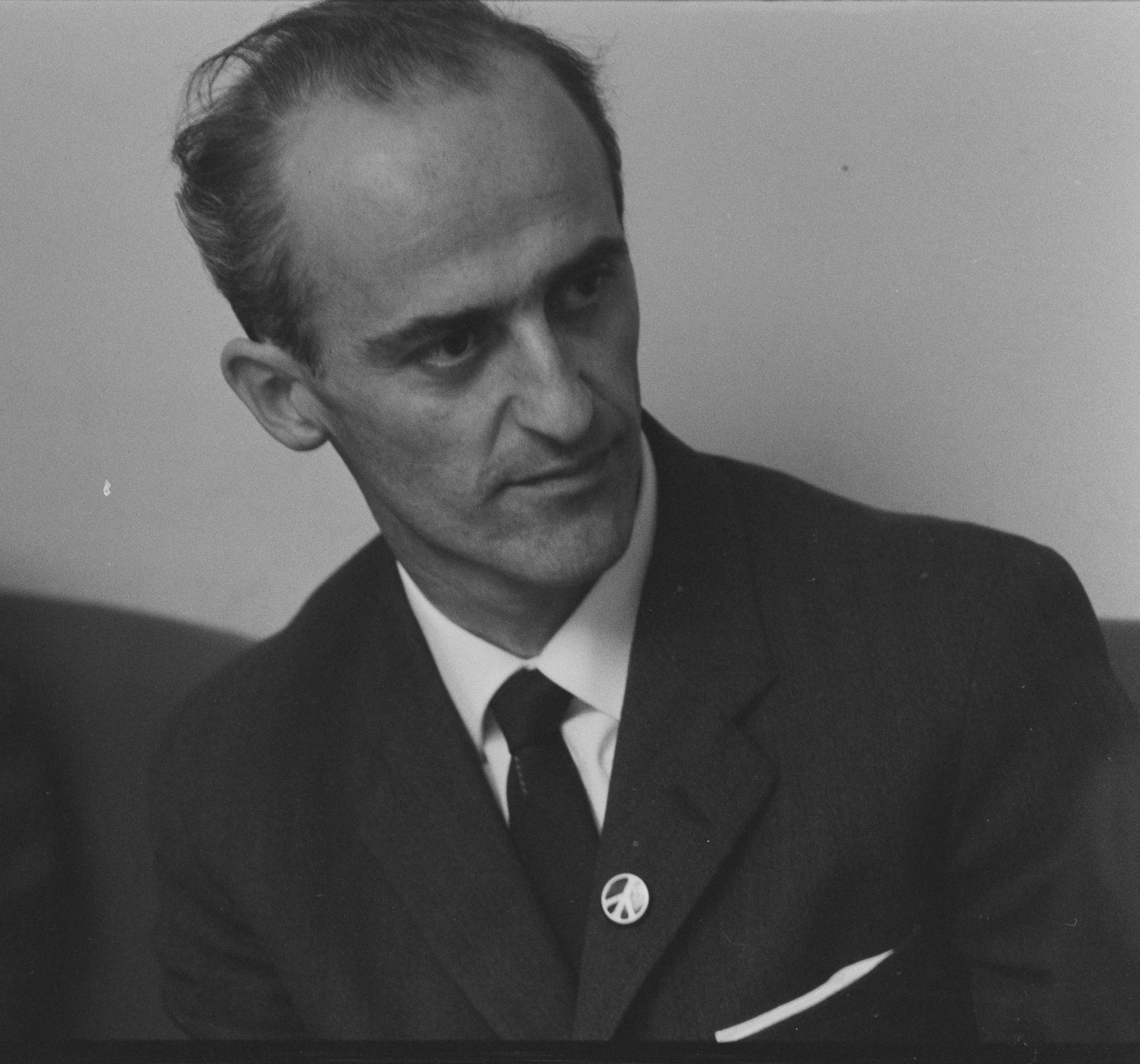

Finn Gustavsen (22 April 1926 in Drammen – 20 July 2005) was a Norwegian socialist politician active from 1945 to the late 1970s. He was noted for his uncompromising style and willingness to take contrarian stands.

== Early life ==
Gustavsen was born into a middle-class family in Drammen, where his father supported the family as the manager of the local cooperative store. Gustavsen started out his career as an industrial worker in Horten and Holmestrand. He became active in the Norwegian Labour Party youth movement (Arbeidernes Ungdomsfylking) in the fall of 1945 after he earned his university entrance certificate in a year.

The year after, he was hired as a reporter for the regional socialist paper in Vestfold, moved on to the national youth periodical for the Labor Party, then was part of a radical group that formed a foreign affairs journal called Orienteering. Although most vocal on foreign policy issues related to the arms race and what the editors generally termed "power bloc politics," the magazine became the platform for a left-wing faction within the Labor Party. This opposition was met with threats - sometimes carried out - of expulsion from the party.

== Later life ==
In 1961, Gustavsen left the party and formed Sosialistisk Folkeparti and was immediately elected into Storting, the Norwegian Parliament as a representative from Oslo. He served as an elected member for the Sosialistisk Folkeparti (SF) (1961–1965 and 1965–1969) and it successor Sosialistisk Venstreparti (1973–1977). When the Labor Party lost its majority in Stortinget, Gustavsen's party became necessary for Labor Party governments to survive votes of no confidence.

Gustavsen decided to turn out the Labor government of Einar Gerhardsen in 1963 over the so-called Kings Bay Affair, ushering in a short-lived but symbolically important non-socialist government under John Lyng.

Although Gustavsen's personality was strongly associated with his party, he made a considerable effort to resist that association. He opted out of reelection twice and had to be persuaded to resume leadership roles. He was a staunch opponent of Norwegian membership in the European Union and resisted the alliance with the Norwegian Communist Party. He risked criminal prosecution for his disclosures of Norwegian plans to build Loran C facilities in support of submarine warfare in Norwegian waters.

In 1977 he resigned from politics and accepted the position as the Norwegian Development Agency's representative in Mozambique. He also resumed his journalistic career, acting as an editor for the party newspaper Ny Tid.
