= Socialist Left Party =

Left-wing political party in Norway

Socialist Left Party Sosialistisk Venstreparti
- Abbreviation: SV
- Leader: Kirsti Bergstø
- Parliamentary leader: Kirsti Bergstø
- Founded: 16 March 1975
- Merger of: Socialist People's Party; Democratic Socialists; Communist Party of Norway (Note: A minority faction led by Communist Party leader Reidar T. Larsen)
- Preceded by: Socialist Electoral League
- Headquarters: Møllergata 4, Oslo
- Youth wing: Socialist Youth
- Membership (2024): ▲16,240
- Ideology: Socialism; Democratic socialism; Eco-socialism; Republicanism (Norwegian); Euroscepticism
- Political position: Left-wing
- European affiliation: European Left Alliance (observer)
- Nordic affiliation: Nordic Green Left Alliance
- Colours: Red; Green; Purple (customary)
- Slogan: For de mange – ikke for de få ('For the many – not the few')
- Storting: 9 / 169
- County Councils: 34 / 574
- County Mayors: 0 / 15
- Municipal Councils: 484 / 9,344
- Municipal Mayors: 5 / 357
- Sami Parliament: 0 / 39

Website
- sv.no

The Socialist Left Party (Norwegian: Sosialistisk Venstreparti, SV; Northern Sami: Sosialisttalaš Gurutbellodat) is a socialist political party in Norway. Positioned on the left-wing of the political spectrum, it is opposed to European Union and the European Economic Area membership. SV supports a strong public sector, stronger social welfare programs, environmentalism, and republicanism. As of 2024, the party had 16,240 members. The party leader is Kirsti Bergstø, who was elected on 18 March 2023.

The party was founded in 1973 as the Socialist Electoral League, an electoral coalition with the Communist Party of Norway, Socialist People's Party, Democratic Socialists – AIK, and independent socialists. In 1975, the coalition was turned into a unified political party. The party was largely founded as a result of the foreign policies prevalent at the time, with the socialists being opposed to Norwegian membership of the European Communities (which later became the European Union) and of NATO.

In the 2005 Norwegian parliamentary election, SV became a governing party for the first time, participating in the red–green coalition with the Labour Party and the Centre Party; before that, it was frequently turned down by the Labour Party. SV was reduced to the seventh-largest party following the 2013 Norwegian parliamentary election, in its worst election on record, but bounced back in the 2017 and 2021 parliamentary elections, although it remained in the opposition both times.

== History ==
=== Formation (1973–1975) ===
Leaders	Term
Berit Ås	1975–1976
Berge Furre	1976–1983
Theo Koritzinsky	1983–1987
Erik Solheim	1987–1997
Kristin Halvorsen	1997–2012
Audun Lysbakken	2012–2023
Kirsti Bergstø	2023–present

After losing all its parliamentary seats in the 1969 parliamentary election, the Socialist People's Party sought to create an election coalition between various left-wing parties. While previously being sceptical of working with the Communist Party of Norway, the party eventually became a member of the coalition, along with the Information Committee of the Labour Movement against Norwegian membership in the European Community, Democratic Socialists and various non-party-aligned independent socialists. Reidar T. Larsen, leader of the Communist Party, said the members at the party's national convention unanimously agreed to join the coalition, which would later go by the name of the Socialist Electoral League.

It took 16 days to negotiate a settlement between the groups. Members agreed that this coalition would be the only way to get a "socialist government" in Norway. By 1973, the Labour Party had suffered a decrease in popular support, which at that time was estimated to around 100,000 voters. Speculation arose that voters had left the Labour Party for the newly created Socialist Electoral League. Early Labour Party predictions were that the Electoral League would dissolve because of internal strife. Reiulf Steen later stated that he had more "respect" for the Maoist Red Electoral Alliance party than the Electoral League. The coalition gained 11.2% of the popular vote and 16 seats in parliament in the 1973 parliamentary election.

The party now known as the Socialist Left was founded in 1975. The Communist Party did not want to dissolve to become a member of the Socialist Left Party, and voted against membership. This led to an internal struggle within the party, with the party's official newspaper, Friheten, strongly suggesting the party could not dissolve, because that would mean the death of the revolutionary movement. The official newspaper of the Socialist People's Party, Orientering, attacked what they called the "hard-core" leaders of the Communist Party. Without the Communist Party, the other parties voted to dissolve the coalition and to replace it with a political party.

=== Early years (1976–1997) ===
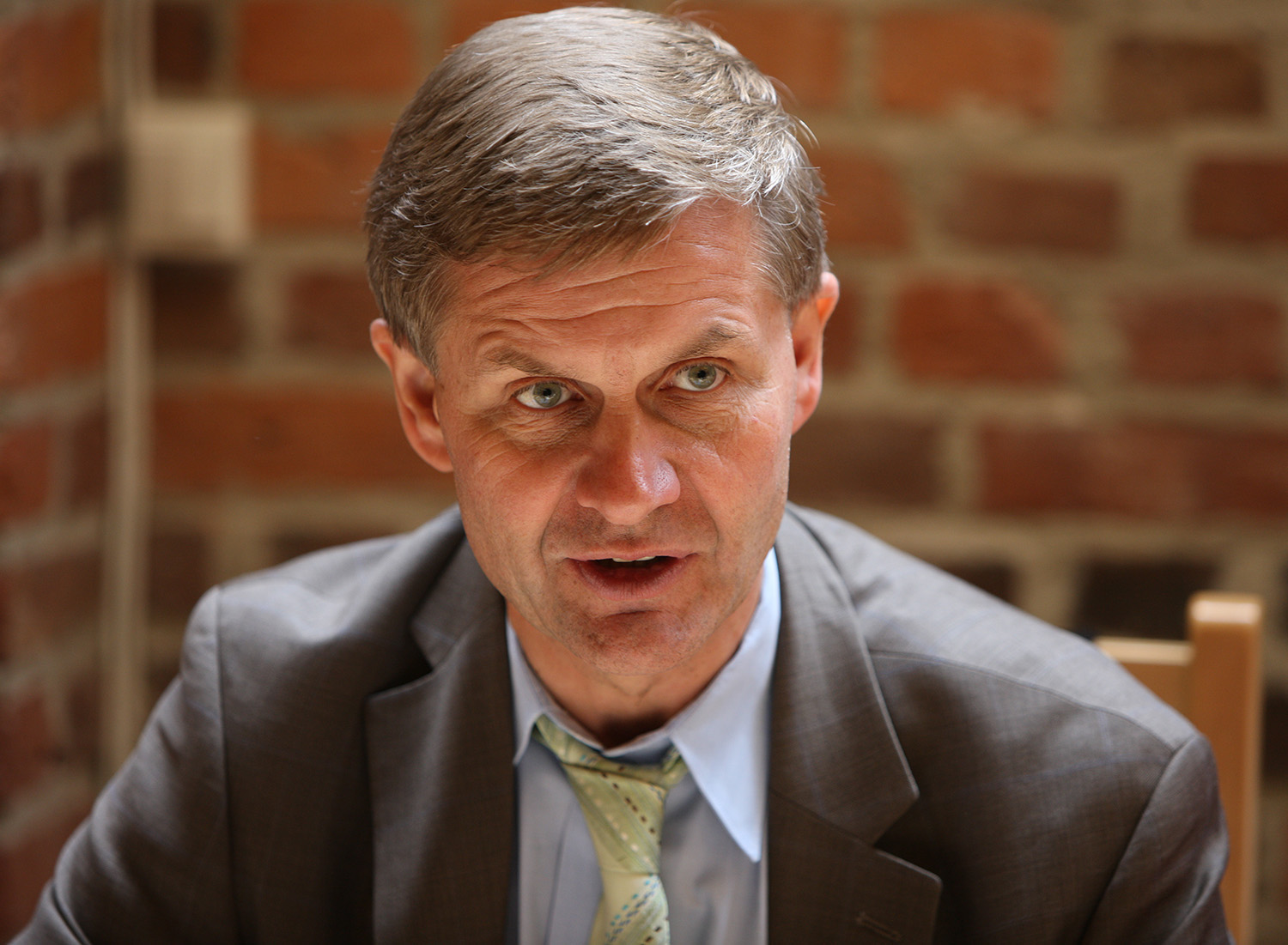
Erik Solheim, party leader from 1987 to 1997, as seen in June 2009

The first years were not successful, as the party lost many of its seats in Parliament, but under Berge Furre's leadership during the 1980s, the party's popularity rose again. Internal conflicts within the party escalated; there were rumours that then–deputy leader Steinar Stjernø was trying to throw out the social democratic wing of the party. A more serious problem for the party was that two of the party's MPs had been convicted of betrayal of the country in the aftermath of World War II, the most notable being Hanna Kvanmo. Later, Kvanmo became one of the leading and best-liked politicians in Norway. Under the leadership of Theo Koritzinsky later in the 1980s, the party became prominent for its efforts for peace, disarmament, employment, green politics, and economic equality.

At the beginning of the 1990s under Erik Solheim, party popularity again declined. SV lost most of its "no to EU" voters to the Centre Party, when the party fought actively against Norwegian membership in the European Union, and when Norwegians again voted against membership in a referendum. Solheim's tenure as leader – while praised by some – was seen as very controversial. The socialist wing of the party, the "Museum Guardians", as they were called, were worried that Solheim was moving the party too much to the center. Outside critics of Solheim said his policies had led to a "grey-blue social democratic" party, with little or no differences from the Labour Party. Solheim tried to get the party to change direction and form a coalition government with the Labour and the Centre Party. Solheim was forced to resign in 1997, with the party seeing him as the main reason for the new power struggle between the left- and right-wing factions of the party.

=== Early leadership of Halvorsen (1997–2005) ===
With the election of Kristin Halvorsen as new party leader in 1997, the party's popularity rose again. Under her leadership, the main focus became education, and the slogan "children and youth first" was coined. The party steadily built up its voter base during the Labour Stoltenberg's First Cabinet, which moved the Labour Party more to center, while privatising government-held assets. This led to a historic high voter turnout for the Socialist Left; they earned 12.5% of the national vote in the 2001 Norwegian parliamentary election. The Labour Party earned a record-low turnout, with only 24.3% of the vote. The turnout only worsened the inner struggle within the party, with party leader Thorbjørn Jagland and Jens Stoltenberg accusing each other. The right-wing faction of the party wanted to continue to move the party further to the center, while the left-wing faction wanted to move the party closer to the Socialist Left. By early 2005, polls showed that over 20% of Norwegian voters would vote for the Socialist Left.

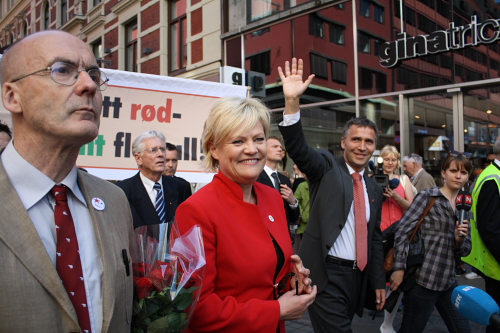
Halvorsen (center) during the Oslo May Day march with Erling Folkvord (left, from Red) and Jens Stoltenberg (right, from the Labour Party)

Prime minister Kjell Magne Bondevik from the Christian Democratic Party believed the three parties were "unclear" and "vague" when talking about the red–green coalition ideological and political position. After discussing the state budget of Norway with the Socialist Left and the Centre Party, Jens Stoltenberg agreed with Halvorsen that they needed to create a universal free day care service. By February 2005, an opinion poll gave the coalition 96 of 169 seats in parliament, with the Socialist Left increasing with 3.9%. Later in February, a small faction within the party called the future coalition the Red-Grey Coalition, believing the environmental policies of the Labour and the Centre Party were not "radical enough".

Before the 2005 Norwegian parliamentary election, Deputy Leader Øystein Djupedal said that the Socialist Left would not contribute to any radical changes if they earned a position within the government. Erna Solberg, leader of the Conservative Party, accused the party of being "communist", because some of its present and earlier connections to communist organisations around Europe. By early August, the Socialist Left was the party having the most progress in the opinion polls, but 17% of the people who voted for the Socialist Left previously were unsure what party they would vote for in the 2005 election. By late August, the party was labelled one of the "big losers" in the election, along with the Conservative Party. Many election researchers believed that the Socialist Left had lost voter's interest when they entered the coalition and worked alongside the Labour Party. The bad election results led to internal struggles within the party, with Djupedal claiming it to be the hardest election in the party history. The party had 5 of 19 ministers in the government, one more than the Centre Party.

=== Red–green coalition (2005–2013) ===
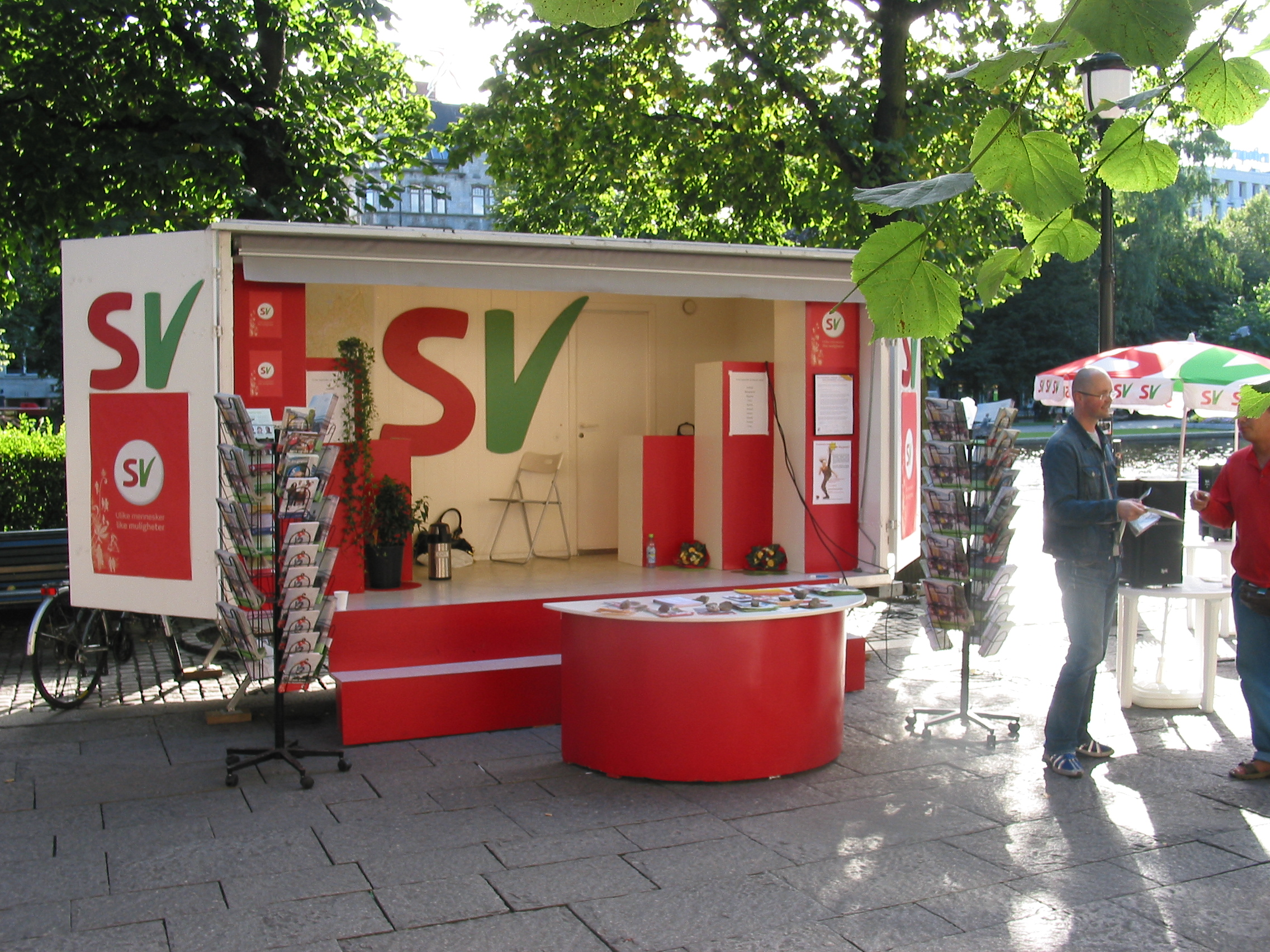
A Socialist Left Party campaign booth in Oslo in July 2007

In the 2009 Norwegian parliamentary election, the party lost four seats and was left with 11, but a three-seat gain by the Labour Party secured the red–green coalition an 86–83 majority. The shift of power within the coalition resulted in the loss of one Socialist Left cabinet minister, leaving them with four, the same as the Centre Party. The Socialist Left and Halvorsen conceded the influential Ministry of Finance to the Labour Party in order to keep control of the Ministry of Education and Research.

Halvorsen announced her resignation following the 2011 Norwegian local elections. The new leader was to be chosen on an extraordinary party congress in 2012. Audun Lysbakken, Heikki Holmås, and Bård Vegar Solhjell have announced their candidature for the leader position. Lysbakken was elected the party's leader on 11 March 2012. The Red Party has criticised the SV for forming a government with the Labour Party, which is regarded by many on the Norwegian Left to be neoliberal, and opening the Barents Sea to oil drilling as well as supporting the NATO-led 2011 military intervention in Libya.

=== Return to opposition (2013–present) ===
Under the leadership of Audun Lysbakken, the party had strong gains in its vote share in elections and membership. In the 2017 Norwegian parliamentary election, the party gained four seats but the incumbent right-wing government led by Erna Solberg was renowned. The 2021 Norwegian parliamentary election was a big win for the left-wing opposition in an election fought on climate change, inequality, and oil. Jonas Gahr Støre's Labour Party was aiming to form a majority government with the Centre Party and the Socialist Left Party, but the latter stated that it would remain in opposition, citing disagreements over climate and welfare policies, while remaining open for future negotiations and to support the government on common grounds. To the press, Lysbakken said the party was open for future negotiations, commenting that it was a good and friendly negotiation, and would be going into opposition for the time being. Centre Party leader Trygve Slagsvold Vedum said: "I think it is the responsibility of the Labour Party and the Socialist Left Party to keep a good tone and see if we can lay the groundwork for a new government." While disappointed for not forming his favoured government, Støre described the talks as friendly and respectful.

On 9 November 2022, Lysbakken, citing family reasons, announced that he would not seek re-election as party leader and would step down at the next party convention in March 2023. Lysbakken was succeeded by his deputy leader, Kirsti Bergstø, at the party convention in March.

== Ideology ==
=== Position ===
Like its predecessors, the Socialist People's Party and the Information Committee of the Labour Movement against Norwegian membership in the European Community, the Socialist Left is a left-wing party which favours a welfare state and taxation of the wealthy. Finn Gustavsen, former leader of the Socialist People's Party, believed that the Labour Party were not socialists, and the only socialist force in parliament were members from the Socialist Electoral League. He was one of the main opponents of Norwegian membership in the European Community, saying the organisation showed how "evil and stupid" capitalism really was. According to a 2002 poll, one out of four members in the Socialist Left wanted Norway to join the European Union.

The party's election program for the 2001 Norwegian parliamentary election stated that the party was a "socialist party" with a vision of a Norway without social injustice. Since its inception, the party has promoted itself as socialist. Since 2003, the party has been portrayed as social democratic by some in the Norwegian media, as democratic socialist by others inside and outside Norway, and has been categorised as eco-socialist, as well as describing itself as eco-socialist. The former leader Audun Lysbakken self-described as a revolutionary, socialist, and Marxist in 2005. He believes the party to be a democratic socialist one.

The Socialist Left also advocates the replacement of capitalism with socialism, arguing that

"We shape our own future. It is possible to create a fair and environmentally friendly world, a society where wealth and power are fairly distributed, with freedom and equal rights for all and where we live together within nature's tolerance limit.

A lot has to change. Millions live with oppression and war, inequality in power and wealth is growing and the environmental crisis threatens our livelihood.

The capitalist system must be replaced – nationally and globally – by a democratic, sustainable and needs-based economic system. It is socialism."

==== Education ====
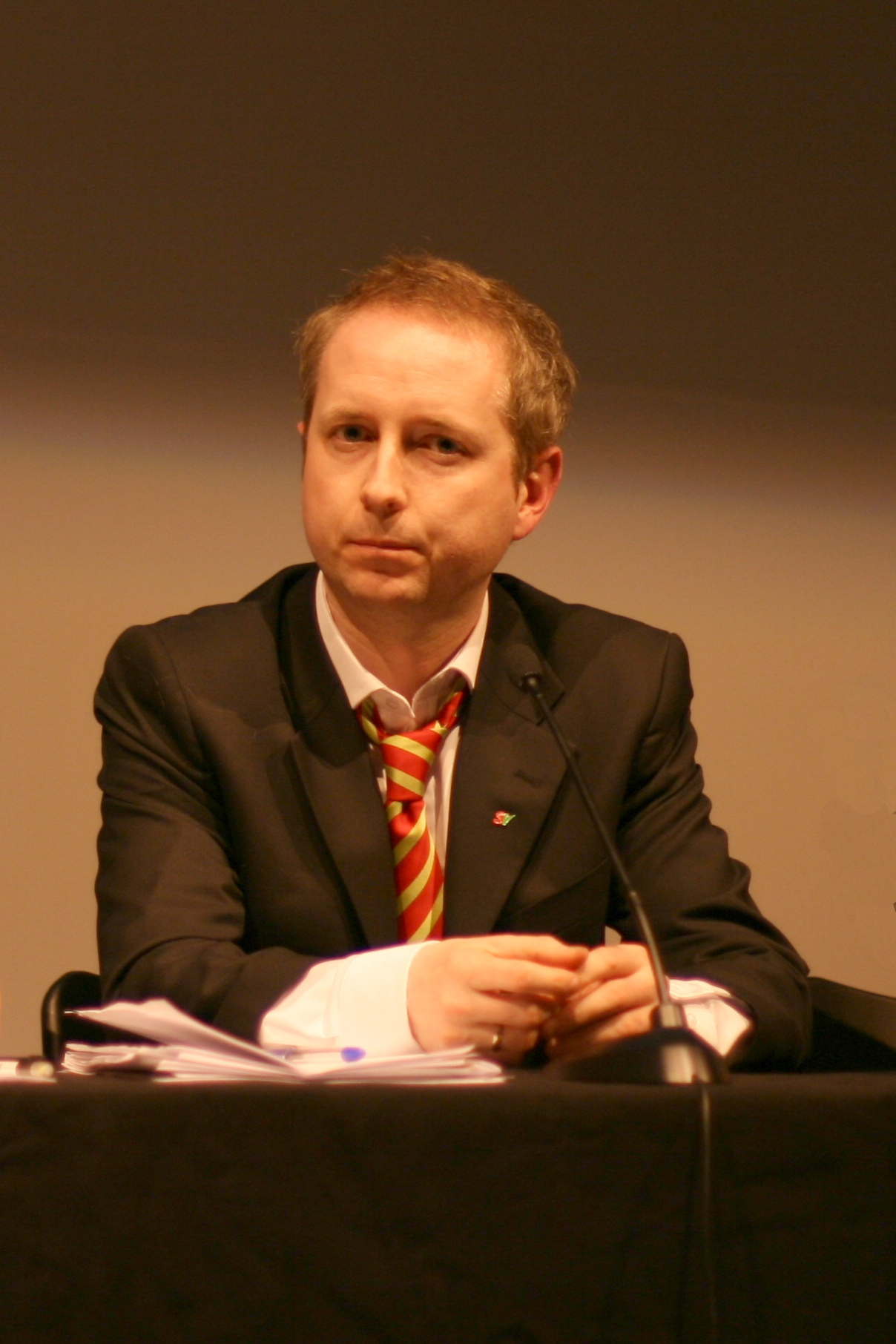
Solhjell was Minister of Education and Research before Halvorsen took over the office.

Education has been one of main campaign issues since Kristin Halvorsen became party leader. Øystein Djupedal was elected Minister of Education and Research, and held that position for two years. He was replaced by fellow Socialist Left politician Bård Vegar Solhjell. Halvorsen took over the ministry in late 2009. Djupedal's first assignment in office was granting 10 million kr to "even out social differences" between ethnic minorities. The party believes that everyone has the right to free access to kindergarten. Anders Folkestad, leader of the Confederation of Unions for Professionals, was not pleased with Djupedal's efforts during his term in office, saying that "Djupedal has created much uncertainty and a mess after he became Minister of Education and Research. Many had great expectations, but he is sure lagging behind from the time when he was a sideliner." Djupedal was heavily criticised by the Norwegian media for his controversial and bizarre statements. In late 2005, it was estimated that students studying general, business, and administrative studies would save up to 11,978 kr under the red–green coalition; school books became free when the coalition took power.

The party wants to reduce the number of private schools, and Djupedal said they are of no use. Bård Vegar Solhjell stated he believed government-funded schools helped "smoothing social inequality", commenting: "Many of those who remain outside the labor market have received lack of training from school. It prevents them from contributing to the community. Parties on the right often confuse social security and welfare schemes as the problem; however, we tend to look at why they are struggling. There are systematic connections between social background and lack of training – it is a class question where something is needed to be done." Others believe that the party should nationalise non-public schools. Torbjørn Urfjell, former leader of the Socialist Youth chapter in Vest-Agder, said: "School and adolescence is too important to be left to the market. Therefore, they should be taken back." During the 2005 Norwegian parliamentary election, the party promised to increase resources to public schools, believing that more money would lead to fewer pupils per teacher, and more individualised and personal instructions.

==== Environment ====
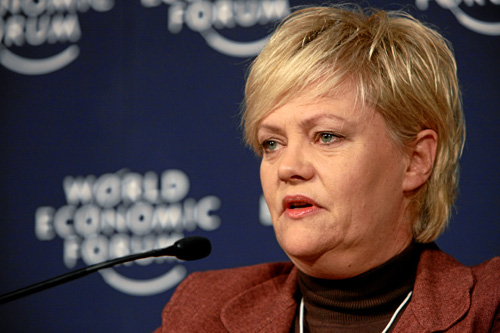
Halvorsen said the environmental policies of the red–green coalition were among the most radical in Europe.

The party has held the office of Minister of the Environment since 2005, first by Helen Bjørnøy, followed by Erik Solheim and since 2012 by Bård Vegar Solhjell. During the 2009 Norwegian parliamentary election, the party promoted itself as the biggest and strongest green party in Norway. The party was highly vocal against oil drilling in Lofoten and Vesterålen during the election campaign. A large minority within the party are opposed to the conservation plan, with the majority of them coming from Nordland, the county where the drilling is taking place. The party struggled, despite the public's strong focus on the green movement and global warming. They failed to gather new voters and experienced one of their worst elections in years. By August 2009, various opinion polls gave the party 10% support but lost most of their voters to the Labour Party during the last days of the election.

The party's strong emphasis on green politics, and its failure to capture new voters, has led to debate among electoral researchers. Frank Aarebrot commented: "It is interesting that both the Socialist Left and the Liberals has this bad turnout, when the environmental conference is taking place in Copenhagen." Halvorsen felt the environmental policies of the second Soria Moria declaration showed a clear level of commitment from the party's coalition partners.

==== Feminism ====
The party has promoted itself as a feminist party. In one of the Socialist Left's brochures, published in 2005, it said, "The Socialist Left is a feminist party. We are fighting for a society where women and men have equal opportunities. This means that women should earn as much as men, that there must be more women in the top positions, and that there are welfare schemes that provide equality in the workplace." During the 2005 parliamentary election, one of the four main issues raised by party's youth wing was fighting against sexual harassment. In January 2005, Klassekampen asked 150 of the 169 representatives in parliament if they considered themselves feminist. According to the survey, the Socialist Left and the Liberal Party were the two most feminist, while The Progress Party was the least feminist party in parliament.

Audun Lysbakken was Minister of Children and Equality from 2009 to 2012. Arild Stokkan-Grande claimed equality amongst men and women has been a major issue in government mainly because of the activities of the Socialist Left. He claimed that there were more women than men serving in the departments the party controlled.

The SV supports the 2008 Sex Purchase Law that criminalises purchasing sex, and said in 2013 that it wanted to ban public strip shows.

In 2013, the party supported the conscription to military services to also include women, which was enacted into legislation in 2015.

==== Immigration and diversity ====
In 1992, Carl I. Hagen of the Progress Party accused the party of supporting free immigration to Norway, after Lisbeth Holand proposed that immigrants from non-European countries should have the same immigration opportunities as immigrants who have their origins from countries that are members of the European Economic Area. While Hagen was highly critical, she felt that the policy would offer housing and jobs for non-Europeans who needed them. An opinion poll showed that 82.9% of the Socialist Left members were open to more immigration, making the party the most immigration-friendly party in parliament, but still less than the non-parliamentary Red Electoral Alliance. In a measurement done in late 2009, the Socialist Left became again the party least hostile to immigrants, this time behind the newly established party Red.

Another poll showed that almost one-third of Socialist Left voters would not want to live in an area with a high number of immigrants. Social geographer Karl Fredrik Tangen responded that it is easy for the typical intellectual Socialist Left voter, living in upper class areas, to agree to what was for them hypothetical question. Recent surveys show that support for the party by immigrants plummeted from 25% in 2005 to 6% in 2009. Norwegian-Somali writer Amal Aden explained that "we do not earn anything from the policies of the Socialist Left. They say that everyone is okay, and that does not work".

The party is open to more immigration, believing Norway will evolve into a more multicultural society. The party believes the only way to create social equality is to create ethnic equality in Norway. By 2009, Prime Minister Jens Stoltenberg said his government would tighten the then prevailing immigration policy, which would make it harder for immigrants to be granted asylum in Norway. The Socialist Left, along with the Liberal Party and the Christian Democrats, felt the new policy was too strict. and the party took a formal dissent in government regarding the asylum policy. The party in particular wants more liberal regulations for asylum cases that involve children.

In 2012, the party leader Audun Lysbakken strongly warned against Islamist extremists like Profetens Ummah, and vowed to fight them. The party is in favour of lifting the ban against religious headwear like hijab and turban for police employees, but has been split over the issue, and a substantial minority, including the youth fraction, voted against allowing religious headwear at the party's convention in 2013.

==== International affairs ====
The military action in Kosovo was a controversial issue within the party; the party leadership supported the military intervention, saying the ethnic cleansing in Kosovo had to be stopped. Supporters included Kristin Halvorsen, who favored NATO's air strikes, but a large group within the party vehemently opposed such support, arguing that violence would only lead to more violence. The party's chapter in Akershus called the attack a "NATO-led terrorist bombing", and believed the bombing marked the first time that Norway had declared war on another nation. They wanted the United Nations to find a peaceful solution to the conflict. Stein Ørnhøi, leader of the Socialist People's Party, said the party's representatives in parliament acted preposterously; he felt they made the wrong decision in supporting NATO's actions in Kosovo when the majority of the party was against it. During the national convention, Halvorsen threatened to resign as party leader unless the factional fighting within the party stopped. This led to a split within the party, with the first group supporting her resignation and the larger second faction concluding that the NATO bombing was to be immediately terminated if the Serbs stopped the ethnic cleansing in Kosovo, if Halvorsen continued as party leader.

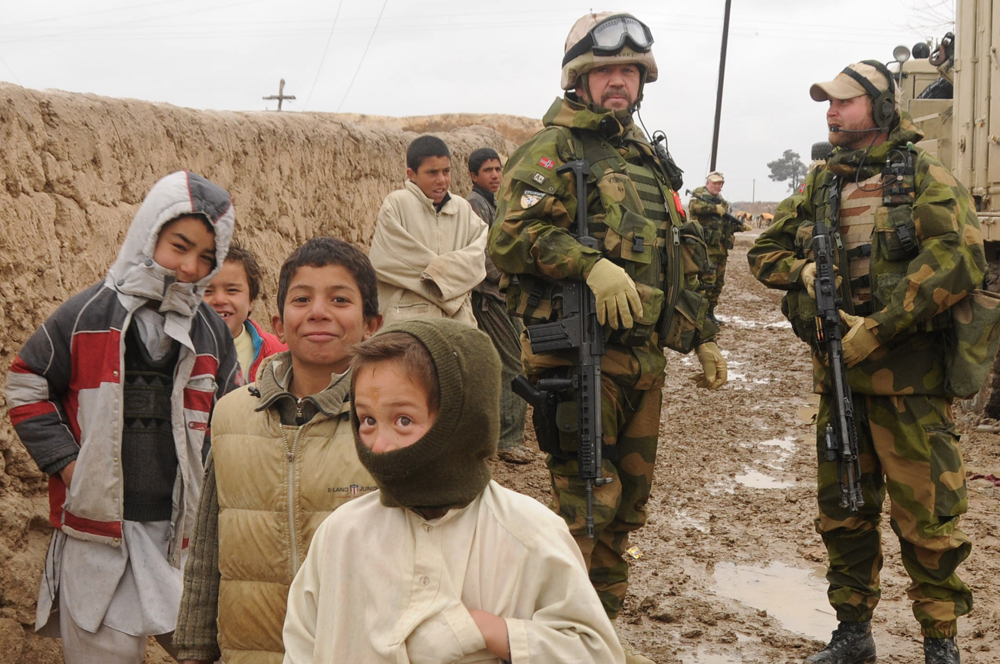
Norwegian International Security Assistance Force (ISAF) troops in Mazar-e-Sharif on 4 February 2009

In most foreign policy issues, the party has opposed military action. They were against the U.S. invasion of Afghanistan and the Iraq War. After joining the red–green coalition in 2005, the party stopped their strong opposition to the two wars, and in 2008 the party proposed creating a "new strategy" for the Norwegian armed forces located in Afghanistan. In 2007, Erik Solheim from the Ministry of International Development visited Norwegian troops in Afghanistan. The policy regarding Afghanistan has led to much unrest within the party, most notably with the party's chapter in Bergen. By early 2008, the party chapters of Hordaland and Rogaland criticised Kristin Halvorsen and the government regarding their Afghanistan policies, and demanded an immediate withdrawal by October 2009. The Oslo chapter asked for drastic changes in the military strategy created by NATO.

Thorbjørn Jagland, then President of the Storting, requested the government should send more soldiers to Afghanistan, if NATO requested it. The Socialist Left supported the war, but was against sending more soldiers to the region, and denied access for the Norwegian Special Forces. Their main reason was that Norway, along with the Netherlands, "clearly had the most soldiers located in Afghanistan", in relation to population in the respective countries, and Afghanistan was "the largest military commitment Norway currently has abroad".

=== Stance on the monarchy ===
The Socialist Left Party is in favor of the replacement of the monarchy with a republican form of government. It has consistently brought forward parliamentary legislation to abolish it.

== Organisation and structure ==
=== Organs ===
The party is split into five organs: the first national convention, which held every second year, the National Board, the Central Committee, Municipal and Local Chapters, and the Party Representatives. The national convention works as a democratic body for the party, where members representing their county or municipal can elect new national representatives for the party. One example of this is the party leader, who stands for election every second year.

The National Board is the party's highest decision-making body between the national conventions. The Board consists of 19 members. Members are elected by each county, plus six members are directly elected during the national convention; some of these are permanent members. In total, there are 36 members. The board meets approximately six times a year to deal with current political and organisational issues. Its task is to adopt the party's budget and to select the party's permanent political representatives. The Central Committee manages the party in the interim period between National Board meetings. Members of the committee are elected by the national convention. the Committee consists of the party leader, the two deputy leaders, the party secretary, the parliamentary leader, the leader of the Socialist Youth, and five other members. The board holds a meeting almost every Monday. The Municipal and Local Chapters organ works as "communication" body between the chapters and the national party.

The last body, the Party's Representative organ, consists of nine national party offices. These offices serves as advisory bodies for the party. The officeholders work alongside the party's parliamentary group, the government apparatus, and the rest of the party organisation on their specialised offices. They also have contact with organisations and communities in their local area. The Party's Representatives normally meet four to six times a year; the group consists of party members from all over the nation who have any special expertise. Party's Representatives are elected by the national convention.

== Election history ==
=== Parliamentary elections ===
In the parliamentary elections in Norway, the Socialist Left Party is the seventh-largest party in Norway, behind the Labour Party, the Conservative Party, the Progress Party, the Christian Democratic Party, the Centre Party, and the Liberal Party. Its popularity initially declined from levels achieved by the Socialist Electoral League. Its seat count rose to its peak after the 2001 Norwegian parliamentary election; this election also marked the Socialist Left's largest voter count, with 12.5% of the national vote.

When the Socialist Electoral League was founded in the early 1970s, the party won voters from the Labour Party, which ruled as a majority government. Early speculation said that the Labour Party had lost 100,000 votes to the Socialist Electoral League. In the 1973 Norwegian parliamentary election, the party gained 16 seats in Storting. After the unification process was finished, the party's voter base collapsed, falling to 4.2% of the national vote in the 1977 Norwegian parliamentary election, and earned only two seats in parliament. In the 1989 Norwegian parliamentary election, the Socialist Left gathered 10.1% of the national vote, falling back again after the 1997 Norwegian parliamentary election.

After having what many described as a bad election, the Labour Party lost many of its voters to the Socialist Left in 2001, with the Socialist Left increasing from 6% to 12.5% of the national vote, again becoming the fourth largest party in the country. In the 2005 Norwegian parliamentary election, the party gathered 8.8% of the vote; this further decreased in the 2009 Norwegian parliamentary election, when the Socialist Left gathered 6.2% of the vote; and again in the 2013 Norwegian parliamentary election, when it gathered 4.1%, 1,600 votes away from falling under the election threshold. The Socialist Left Party bounced back in the mid-2010s, making gains in the 2017 Norwegian parliamentary election, and contributing to the big left-wing opposition win in the 2021 Norwegian parliamentary election.

=== Local elections ===
The 1975 Norwegian local elections were met with a sharp decrease in voters, with the party earning a disappointing voter turnout of 5.5% in the municipal election and 5.7% in the county election. In an opinion poll done before election day in 1975, it was estimated that half of the voters who voted for the Socialist Electoral League would not vote for the party again. The decrease in voters was due to the Labour Party's election surge during the 1973 Norwegian parliamentary election. The party further decreased in popular support by the 1979 Norwegian local elections, earning 4.1% in the municipal and 4.4% in the county respectively.

By the 1983 Norwegian local elections, the party increased by 1% in the municipal and 0.9% in the county election. According to an opinion poll done in early September, the Labour Party would lose four of its Oslo representatives in parliament to the Progress Party, the Conservative Party, and the Socialist Left. If the 1983 local election had been a parliamentary election, the Socialist Left would have received 8 seats in parliament. The party earned 5.5% and 5.7% in the 1987 Norwegian local elections, respectively at the municipal and county level. The party's strongest county was Nordland, where the party gained 21.9% of the popular vote.

The 1991 Norwegian local elections marked a large increase in voters for the party, earning 11.6 in the municipalities and 12.2% in the counties, making the party the third-largest party in Norway. The Socialist Left, along with the Centre Party, was named the election's "big winners" by the Norwegian press. In the 1995 Norwegian local elections, the party gathered 5.9% in the municipalities and 6.1% in counties. Before the 1999 Norwegian local elections, polls showed an increase in popular support for the Socialist Left in Oslo. The reason for the increase was that the party was again able to win votes from the Labour Party. The party gained 7.8% of the votes in the municipalities and 8.5% in the counties.

By 2003, the party's voter based had increased dramatically over the 1999 local elections. The party had what many described as a "record election", winning most of its voters from the Labour Party. The 2007 Norwegian local elections resulted in their voter base to reduced by half. In the 2011 Norwegian local elections, the party got just slightly above 4% of all votes on a nationwide basis. After this, party leader Kristin Halvorsen announced her resignation on the election night. A similar result occurred in the 2015 Norwegian local elections, despite gains for left-leaning parties, but the Socialist Left was able to form a majority coalition with the Labour Party and Red Party in Tromsø. In the 2019 Norwegian local elections, the Socialist Left Party returned to its 2007 levels and made further gains, alongside the Green and Red parties.

== Election results ==
=== Storting ===
Election	Leader	Votes	%	Seats	+/–	Position	Status
1973	Finn Gustavsen	241,851	11.2	16 / 155	New	▲4th	External support
1977	Berge Furre	96,248	4.2	2 / 155	▼14	▼5th	External support
1981	Berge Furre	121,561	4.9	4 / 155	▲2	▲4th	Opposition
1985	Theo Koritzinsky	141,950	5.5	6 / 157	▲2	▼5th	Opposition (1985–1986)
1985	Theo Koritzinsky	141,950	5.5	6 / 157	▲2	▼5th	External support (1986–1989)
1989	Erik Solheim	266,782	10.1	17 / 165	▲11	▲4th	Opposition (1989–1990)
1989	Erik Solheim	266,782	10.1	17 / 165	▲11	▲4th	External support (1990–1993)
1993	Erik Solheim	194,633	7.9	13 / 165	▼4	4th	External support
1997	Kristin Halvorsen	155,307	6.0	9 / 165	▼4	▼6th	Opposition (1997–2000)
1997	Kristin Halvorsen	155,307	6.0	9 / 165	▼4	▼6th	External support (2000–2001)
2001	Kristin Halvorsen	316,397	12.5	23 / 165	▲14	▲4th	Opposition
2005	Kristin Halvorsen	232,971	8.8	15 / 169	▼8	4th	Coalition
2009	Kristin Halvorsen	166,361	6.2	11 / 169	▼4	4th	Coalition
2013	Audun Lysbakken	116,021	4.1	7 / 169	▼4	▼7th	Opposition
2017	Audun Lysbakken	176,222	6.0	11 / 169	▲4	▲5th	Opposition
2021	Audun Lysbakken	227,274	7.5	13 / 169	▲2	5th	External support
2025	Kirsti Bergstø	181,192	5.6	9 / 169	▼4	▲4th	External support

=== Local elections ===
Election	Vote %	Type
1975	5.5; 5.7	Municipal; County
1979	4.1; 4.4	Municipal; County
1983	5.1; 5.3	Municipal; County
1987	5.5; 5.7	Municipal; County
1991	11.6; 12.2	Municipal; County
1995	5.9; 6.1	Municipal; County
1999	7.8; 8.5	Municipal; County
2003	12.4; 13.0	Municipal; County
2007	6.2; 6.5	Municipal; County
2011	4.1; 4.3	Municipal; County
2015	4.1; 4.0	Municipal; County
2019	6.1; 6.0	Municipal; County
2023	6.8; 6.1	Municipal; County

== Notable people ==
- Richard Edvardsen (1993–1997), deputy representative to the Norwegian Parliament
- Kjellbjørg Lunde (1981– ), parliament representative, after 1981 term, re-elected three times.

== See also ==
- Ireland Front
- List of national conventions held by the Socialist Left Party
- Politics of Norway
