= Bernt H. Lund =

Norwegian diplomat and politician (1924–2026)

- Born: 14 August 1924; Aker, Norway
- Died: 5 August 2026 (aged 101)
- Occupations: Civil servant, politician, diplomat
- Political party: Labour Party
- Parent: Sigrid Helliesen Lund

Bernt Henrik Lund CBE (14 August 1924 – 5 August 2026) was a Norwegian civil servant, diplomat and politician for the Labour Party. He held leading administrative positions in the municipality of Oslo, and also worked on foreign affairs, including foreign aid projects. Lund was Norway's first ambassador to Namibia.

== Background ==
Lund was born in Aker on 14 August 1924, as the son of civil engineer Diderich Hegermann Lund and Sigrid Emilie Helliesen. He was a great-grandson of Bernt Lund and great-great-grandson of Diderich Hegermann and Ole Wilhelm Erichsen. Lund was married to psychologist Bente Onsager Fredriksen (1921–1995) from 1951 to 1964, and to Ebba Sundt (née Andersson) from 1964.

Lund died on 5 August 2026, shortly before reaching the age of 102.

== Career ==
Lund finished his secondary education in 1942. During World War II he also took part in resistance work. He was arrested in May 1942 and incarcerated in Åkebergveien. He was moved to Grini concentration camp in June 1942, and sent to the Sachsenhausen concentration camp in March 1944. He graduated in political science from the Stockholm University in 1949. While studying he chaired the Stockholm-based organization Clarté from 1948 to 1949, and also chaired the Norwegian Students' Society in 1951. From 1952 to 1958 he was a board member of the Workers' Youth League, and from 1954 to 1957 he was a bureau member of the International Union of Socialist Youth. He represented the Labour Party in Oslo City Council from 1956 to 1967, and chaired Oslo school board from 1964 to 1967. He took part in starting the newspaper Orientering, and was situated on the left wing of the Labour Party. Lund was the first chairman of the Information Committee of the Labour Movement against Norwegian membership in the European Community (AIK) from its establishment in January 1972.

He was a lecturer at Norges Kommunal- og Sosialskole from 1953 to 1963, and rector from 1963 to 1967. From 1967 he held leading administrative position at the municipality of Oslo, in health administration until 1969, then chief administrative officer of finance from 1970 to 1985. From 1985 to 1989 he was the permanent under-secretary of state in the Ministry of Development Cooperation. He was then a special counsellor in the Ministry of Foreign Affairs for a short time, then the ambassador to Namibia from 1990 to 1992. He also represented the Norwegian Agency for Development Cooperation in Namibia, and from 1993 he was a consultant for the organization.

Lund chaired Oslo Bolig- og Sparelag from 1987 to 1990, and chaired the council of SOS-barnebyer from 1993 to 2000. From 1977 to 1983 he chaired the chief administrative officer's council in the Norwegian Association of Local and Regional Authorities.

He was decorated Commander of the Danish Order of Dannebrog, the Order of the Lion of Finland, the Swedish Order of the Polar Star, the Order of the British Empire, the Icelandic Order of the Falcon, and recipient of the Medal of St. Hallvard.

Civic offices
Preceded by Borger A. Lenth	Permanent under-secretary of state in the Ministry of Development Cooperation; 1985–1989	Succeeded by
