= Grete Faremo =

Norwegian jurist and politician

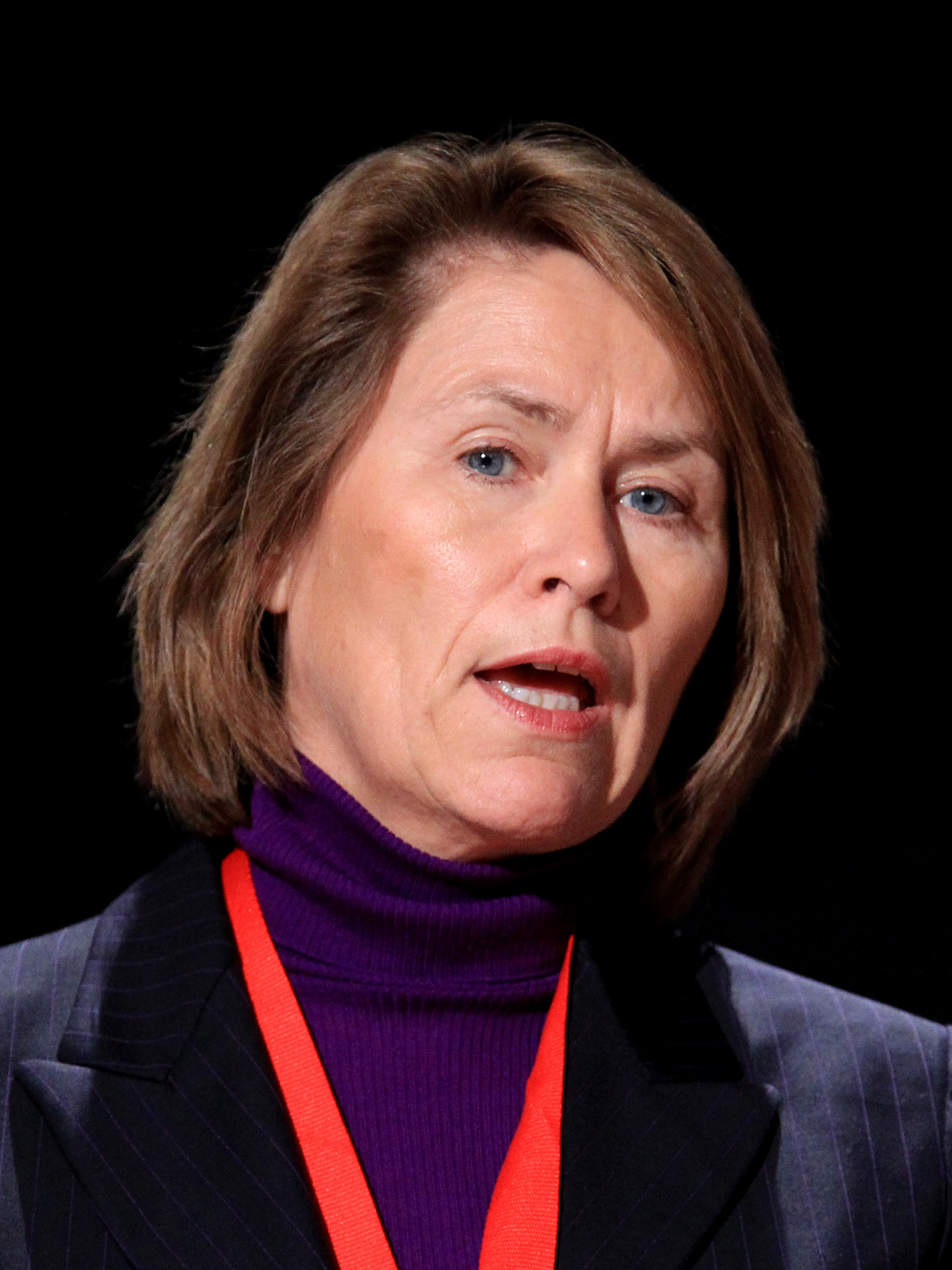
- Faremo in 2010

Executive Director of the United Nations Office for Project Services
- In office August 2014 – 8 May 2022
- Secretary-General: Ban Ki-moon; António Guterres
- Preceded by: Jan Mattsson

Minister of Justice
- In office 11 November 2011 – 16 October 2013
- Prime Minister: Jens Stoltenberg
- Preceded by: Knut Storberget
- Succeeded by: Anders Anundsen
- In office 4 September 1992 – 25 October 1996
- Prime Minister: Gro Harlem Brundtland
- Preceded by: Kari Gjesteby
- Succeeded by: Anne Holt

Minister of Defence
- In office 20 October 2009 – 11 November 2011
- Prime Minister: Jens Stoltenberg
- Preceded by: Anne-Grete Strøm-Erichsen
- Succeeded by: Espen Barth Eide

Minister of International Development
- In office 3 November 1990 – 4 September 1992
- Prime Minister: Gro Harlem Brundtland
- Preceded by: Tom Vraalsen
- Succeeded by: Kari Nordheim-Larsen

Minister of Petroleum and Energy
- In office 25 October 1996 – 18 December 1996
- Prime Minister: Thorbjørn Jagland
- Preceded by: Finn Kristensen (1992)
- Succeeded by: Ranveig Frøiland

Member of the Norwegian Parliament
- In office 1 October 1993 – 30 September 1997
- Deputy: Dagny Gärtner Hovig; Per Skau
- Constituency: Oslo

Personal details
- Born: Grete Faremo; 16 June 1955 (age 71) Arendal, Aust-Agder, Norway
- Party: Labour
- Spouse: Magne Lindholm (2014–)
- Children: 1, Oda Faremo Lindholm
- Education: University of Oslo

Grete Faremo (born 16 June 1955) is a Norwegian politician, lawyer and business leader. From August 2014 to May 2022, she held the post of Under-Secretary-General and Executive Director of the United Nations Office for Project Services (UNOPS). During her political career, she held high-level positions in the Norwegian Government including Minister of Justice from 1992-1996 and 2011–2013, Minister of Petroleum and Energy in 1996, Minister of International Development from 1990-1992 and Minister of Defence from 2009–2011.

== Family background and professional career ==
Faremo was born in Arendal in 1955 and grew up in Byglandsfjord, Setesdal, southern Norway. She is the daughter of the Norwegian politician Osmund Faremo (1921-1999) and Tora Aamlid (1921). Much of Faremo's early political philosophy was strongly influenced by her father, who was a prisoner of war during the Second World War, after being arrested as part of Adolf Hitler's Nacht und Nebel directive.

Faremo attended Hornnes Gymnas in the nearby village of Hornnes and graduated in 1973. She went on to study law at the University of Oslo, specializing in international law and spent a summer in 1978 at The Hague Academy of International Law. The same year, Faremo graduated from university with a master's degree in Law.

She entered public service 1979, joining the Ministry of Finance as a Legal Officer. She then went on to work as a Legal Officer in the Norwegian Agency for Development Cooperation (1980-1984). Following this, she was appointed Head of Division of the Ministry of Development and left in 1986 to take up a new position as Chief Negotiator at property management company, Aker Eiendom AS. Two years later, she became the executive director at Theatrium AS, at the newly developed Aker Brygge in Oslo, leaving in 1990 to become a Director in the Norwegian Arbeiderpresse (now known as Amedia).

In 1997, Faremo became Executive Vice-President of Storebrand, a Norwegian financial services company. She left in 2004 to take on the role as Director of Law, Corporate Affairs and Public Relations at Microsoft Corporation's North Europe Office and later Western Europe Office, where she developed the legal and public affairs division responsible for corporate compliance in the region. She stepped down in 2008. She was also a partner at an independent consulting firm, Rådgiverne LOS AS, for short period in 2009, before she joined the Government.

Faremo has also sat on various advisory boards and associations throughout her career, including as a member of the Norwegian Press Complaints Commission (PFU) from 1998 to 2004, Chairman of Statnett SF (2000-2005), Chairman of the Norwegian People's Aid (2003-2007), Deputy Chairman of the Norwegian Defence Research Establishment (FFI) (2006-2009), Deputy Chairman of Norsk Hydro ASA (2006-2009), Board Member of COWI A/S (2008-2009), Chairman of the Norwegian Health SF in 2009, the Oslo Philharmonic Orchestra and the University of Bergen.

== Political career ==
On 3 November 1990, Faremo was appointed Minister of International Development as part of Gro Harlem Brundtland's Third Cabinet. She held this post for two years before being promoted to Minister of Justice and Public Security in September 1992. The following year, in the 1993 Norwegian parliamentary elections, Faremo was elected to the Storting, representing the Oslo constituency. Before this, she was a member of the Oslo City Council from 1987 to 1991.

During her time as Minister of Justice, Faremo initiated negotiations between Schengen member countries and Norway on security and free movement in Europe, which culminated in the Nordic Schengen Agreement, signed in 1996 by the Governments of Denmark, Finland, Iceland, Norway and Sweden.

She continued as Justice Minister until the cabinet reshuffle in October 1996, where she was asked by newly appointed Prime Minister Thorbjørn Jagland to take over the Petroleum and Energy portfolio. However, just two months after her appointment, Faremo was forced to resign from the cabinet following the Berge Furre affair, which had revealed that the Norwegian Police Security Service were illegally spying on Socialist Left Party politician, Berge Furre, while he was a member of the Lund Commission – a group appointed to investigate allegations of illegal surveillance of Norwegian citizens.

The illegal surveillance of Furre took place at the same time that Faremo was Justice Minister. She resigned from the cabinet on 18 December 1996, however one source says she was forced to resign. She continued in her role as a Member of the Storting (the Norwegian Parliament) until the following general election in 1997 when she did not seek re-election.

== Return to government as Minister of Defence ==
After working in the private sector for 12 years, Faremo returned to Norwegian politics when she was appointed Minister of Defence under Prime Minister Jens Stoltenberg's Second Cabinet. During her time as Defence Minister, she headed the preparation of a new long-term plan for Norwegian defence, which formed the basis for the new Air Force organization, including the acquisition of new F35 fighter jets.

== Minister of Justice following the 2011 Norway attacks ==
Facing mounting pressure in the aftermath of the 2011 Norway attacks over the state of the police and security, the incumbent Justice Minister, Knut Storberget, announced his resignation. He declared that six years as Justice Minister was sufficient and that he wished to focus his attention on remaining in parliament and his family. Faremo took over the Ministry on 11 November 2011, tasked with strengthening the Norwegian emergency system. This involved the establishment of a new structure, new communication systems, and clear chains of command for crisis management and communications. A thorough analysis of the police, commissioned by Faremo, formed the basis for reforms in the Norwegian police structure.

Faremo lost her position as Minister of Justice following the 2013 Norwegian parliamentary election in which the incumbent red-green coalition lost to the a centre-right coalition made up of the Conservatives and the Progress Party – known as the “Blue-Blue” coalition.

== Executive Director of United Nations Office for Project Services ==
On 7 May 2014, United Nations Secretary-General Ban Ki-moon announced the appointment of Faremo as the Under-Secretary-General and new Executive Director of the UNOPS. She replaced Jan Mattsson who stepped down after being in charge for eight years.

Since taking over as executive director, Faremo emphasised her ambition to increase the visibility and transparency of the organization. Speaking about her goals, Faremo said: "I think UNOPS holds experiences and has made great achievements that should be better communicated, so I’ve taken it on as an important task for me to share more of that."

Faremo implemented changes to UNOPS that made it run more "like a business" and less like a bureaucratic agency dedicated to ensuring contracting rules were followed. She wrote in 2019 that under her "more than 1,200 pages of rules went into the trash" and that she was "rewriting our operational principles" in the name of running UNOPS more like a fast and agile business. Under Faremo, UNOPS also acquired a "surplus" due to charging other UN agencies more for the projects that went through it (and was accused of "overcharging" on this). However, without these safeguards, Faremo proceeded to make very questionable use of this money. She lent over 25 million dollars to David Kendrick, a British businessman she met at a party she hosted, which included paying Kendrick's young daughter 3 million dollars to write a pop song. Another initiative personally supported by Faremo, the Sustainable Investments in Infrastructure and Innovation or S3i for short, ran into major problems with its money being spent ineffectively on contractors who failed to deliver the claimed work, yet continued to be paid and have their contracts renewed.

Faremo's deputy Vitaly Vanshelboim was placed on executive leave in December 2021 as the United Nations Office of Internal Oversight Services investigated the allegations and audited the matter. Faremo resigned in disgrace in early May 2022 after a series of scathing blog posts by Mukesh Kapila drew attention to the problems under Faremo's tenure, and The New York Times published an article detailing the David Kendrick affair.

== Personal life ==
Outside of her political and professional life, Faremo is an experienced singer. She began singing from a young age and is skilled in a variety of genres including pop, rock, musicals and cabarets. She is particularly fond of performing songs by the French cabaret singer, Édith Piaf.

In 2000, she featured on a song with Norwegian rock and folk artist Trond Granlund called “Losbylinna” which spent five weeks at Number 1 on NRK's Norsktoppen chart

She is fluent in English, Danish and Swedish, aside from her Norwegian mother tongue.

Her partner is Norwegian actor, Magne Lindholm. Together they have one daughter, Oda, who works as a journalist, author and historian in Oslo.

Political offices
Preceded by Kari Gjesteby	Minister of Justice and the Police; 1992–1996	Succeeded by Anne Holt
Preceded by Anne-Grete Strøm-Erichsen	Minister of Defence; 2009–2011	Succeeded by Espen Barth Eide
Preceded by Knut Storberget	Minister of Justice and the Police; 2011–2013	Succeeded by Anders Anundsen
Preceded by Tom Vraalsen	Minister of International Development; 1990–1992	Succeeded by Kari Nordheim-Larsen
Preceded by Finn Kristensen	Minister of Petroleum and Energy; October–December 1996	Succeeded by Ranveig Frøiland
