= Borger A. Lenth =

Norwegian civil servant (born 1937)

Borger Arildssøn Lenth (born 13 December 1937) was a Norwegian civil servant, banker and lawyer.

He was born in Hamar as a son of triple jumper Arild Lenth (1904–1972) and Guri Bakke (1910–1989). In 1963 he married Hanne Kirsten Jenssen. He finished his secondary education in his hometown in 1956, and in 1962 he graduated from the University of Oslo with a cand.jur. degree. He was a deputy judge in Hamar and studied at the London School of Economics and in Lausanne in the 1960s. He also chaired the tennis group in Hamar IL in 1963.

His main career track, as a banker, started in 1965 in Den norske Creditbank (DnC). He was steadily promoted to managerial positions by chief executive Johan Melander, until Lenth became deputy chief executive in 1980. Melander retired in the same year. Lenth was deputy chief executive for two years, then became director of the Norwegian Agency for Development Cooperation from 1982 to 1984 and permanent under-secretary of state in the Ministry of Development Cooperation from 1984 to 1985. He returned to his old position in DnC, but also took an MBA at Harvard Business School and was hired as chief executive of Eksportfinans in 1987. From 1991 to 1997 he was the chief executive of Christiania Bank- og Kreditkasse.

After that he was a partner in the law firm Hjort DA and bought the farm Svestad in Stai. Lenth has been chairman of Treschow-Fritzøe and BN Bank and vice chairman of Norsk Hydro, and a board member of Norfund. He also chairs Save the Children Norway since 2005, and was a member of the financial committee for the Ibsen Year. He is a member of the gentleman's clubs Det Norske Selskab and Det grønne Selskab.

Civic offices
| Preceded by Arne Arnesen | Director of the Norwegian Agency for Development Cooperation; 1982–1984 | Succeeded by Nils Vogt (civil servant) |
| Preceded by position created | Permanent under-secretary of state in the Ministry of Development Cooperation; 1984–1985 | Succeeded by Bernt H. Lund |
Business positions
| Preceded by Sverre Walter Rostoft Jr. | Chief executive of Christiania Bank- og Kreditkasse; 1991–1997 | Succeeded by |
