= Vetlesen =

Vetlesen is a Norwegian patronymic surname, literally meaning "son of Vetle". It may refer to:

- Arne Johan Vetlesen (born 1960), Norwegian philosopher
- G. Unger Vetlesen (1889–1959), Norwegian shipbuilder
- Hugo Vetlesen (born 2000), Norwegian footballer
- Ingrid Vetlesen (born 1981), Norwegian singer
- Leif Vetlesen (1921–2003), Norwegian sailor and politician
- Vesla Vetlesen (born 1930), Norwegian weaver, trade unionist, writer and politician, and second wife of Leif Vetlesen

== See also ==
- Vetlesen Prize, Columbia University award
