= Arc Aid and Arc Kenya =

Community development organisations in Kenya

ARC-Aid and Arc-Kenya are two community development organisations whose main area of operation is Nyanza, Kenya. Arc-Aid is based in Norway and mainly handles administrative work and fundraising for the projects run in Kenya it also has a hand in logistical work and project creation for various initiatives put into place. Arc-Kenya is based in Kenya and has most of the responsibility for project implementation. It runs most of its activities from its offices in the ARO Development Centre.

== Location. ==
ARC-Aid is based in Kristiansand town located in the South of Norway, its offices are in the Archives building, a historical site used as a base of operation for many humanitarian organisations based in Kristiansand. The development programmes it runs are based in Nyanza and run in conjunction with their Kenyan partners ARC-Kenya. ARC Kenya is based in the ARO Development Centre which is located in Majiwe District in Nyanza. The ARC stands for Action Resort for Change.

== History ==
Operations of both organisations began in 1992 when construction started on the ARO Development Centre in Majiwa District, Western Kenya. The buildings were completed in 1996. Initially the centre was envisioned as a centre for the care of those affected by HIV/AIDS but due to the crippling poverty of the surrounding region it was decided that it would be better to focus on community development and poverty reduction. In 2001 the centre completely rededicated itself to this purpose though there is still a health clinic on the premises run by the Seventh Day Adventists. The twin organisations of ARC-Aid and ARC-Kenya are now focused on community development through technical and sustainable solutions to poverty and environmental issues

== Projects run. ==
=== Kenya Change Agent and Change Agent Training. ===
A program designed to deliver training to individuals who as change agents go out and create change in the society by running their own trainings in different settings and setting up projects aimed at changing the community.

=== The Child Care Program. ===
Run at ARO Development Centre, it was begun in May 2005 initially offering support to 10 students it has grown to a capacity of 130 orphans. The help offered includes support for school fees, uniforms and books as well as food that they can carry home. Every Saturday the children are hosted for a day of learning and fun activities at the ARO Development Centre.

=== The Pure Light Project. ===
A project aimed at providing local families with an alternative source of lighting to the current state of sooty, kerosene fuelled lamps. The aim of the project is to provide the alternative of LED solar lamps to the families. These lamps provide a clean source of light at a cost that is much lower in the long run.

=== SEETEP. ===
SEETEP stands for Solar Energy and Environmental Technology Education Program. It is a project aimed at building a solar energy and water management school in the Mawere District of Nyanza. Construction on the school has already begun with curriculum development underway and being conducted by Kvadraturen School in Kristiansand and Kisumu Polytechnic in Nyanza. The project is funded by NORAD and receives technical help from Elkem Solar. The school should be completed and self-sustainable by the year 2016.
