= Nils Vogt =

Nils Vogt may refer to:

- Nils Vogt (comedian) (born 1948), Norwegian comedian
- Nils Vogt (civil servant) (1926–2000), Norwegian civil servant and diplomat
- Nils Collett Vogt (1864–1937), Norwegian poet
- Nils Vogt (journalist) (1859–1927), Norwegian journalist and editor

== See also ==
- Niels Petersen Vogt (1817–1894), Norwegian politician
- Niels Nielsen Vogt (1798–1869), Norwegian priest and politician
