= Anne Kristin Sydnes =

Norwegian politician

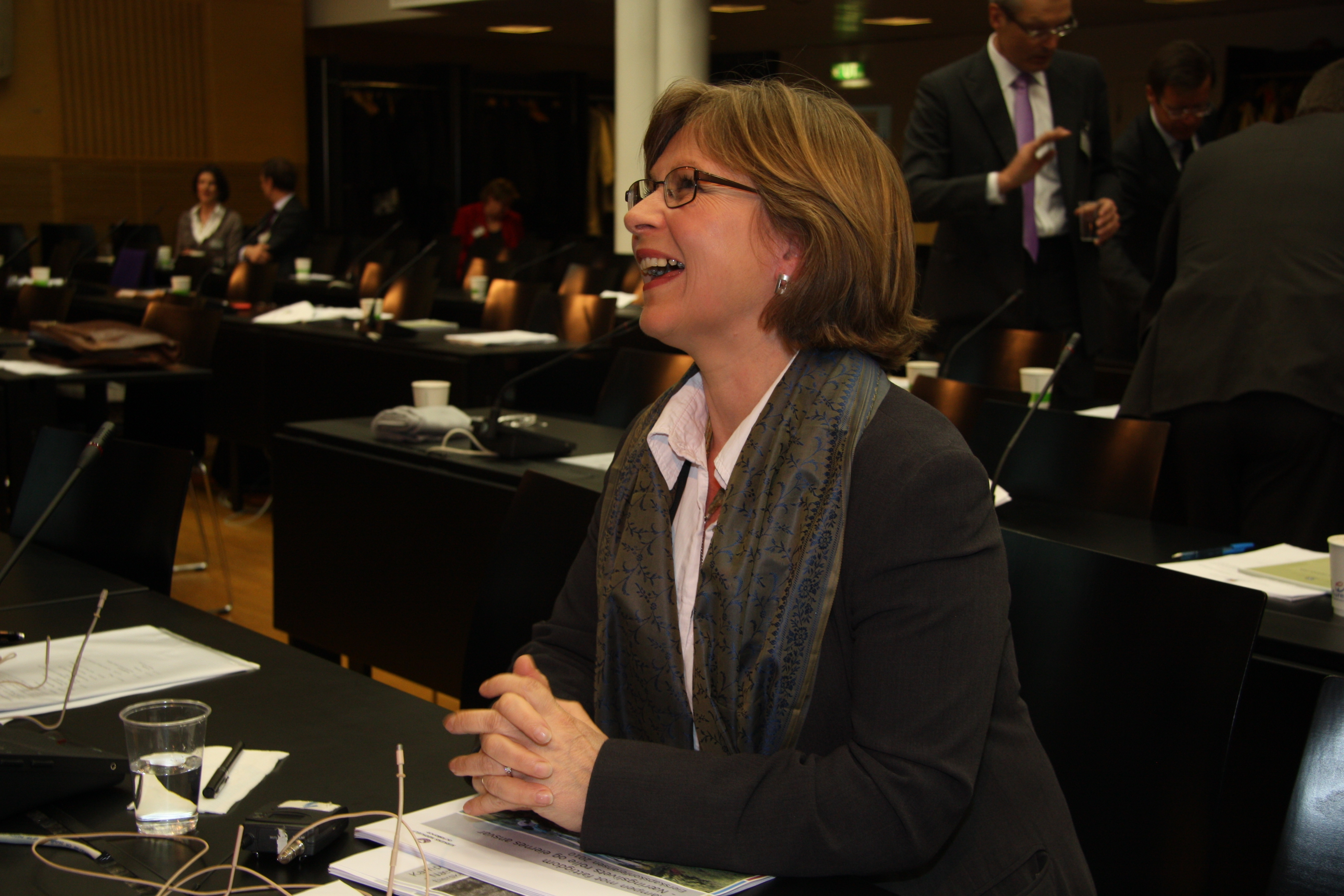
- Sydnes in 2010

Minister of International Development
- In office 17 March 2000 – 19 October 2001
- Prime Minister: Jens Stoltenberg
- Preceded by: Hilde Frafjord Johnson
- Succeeded by: Hilde Frafjord Johnson

Personal details
- Born: 13 May 1956 Oslo, Norway
- Died: 3 March 2017 (aged 60) Oslo, Norway
- Party: Labour
- Spouse: Jan Egeland
- Children: 2
- Occupation: Politician

Anne Kristin Sydnes (13 May 1956 – 3 March 2017) was a Norwegian politician for the Labour Party. She was the Minister of International Development in the Ministry of Foreign Affairs during the first cabinet Stoltenberg 2000–2001. She was married to Jan Egeland, and died of cancer at the age of 60.

Political offices
Preceded by Hilde Frafjord Johnson	Norwegian Minister of International Development; 2000–2001	Succeeded by Hilde Frafjord Johnson
