= Eik =

Eik or EIK may refer to:

== People ==
- Arild Eik (1943–2009), Norwegian aid worker and diplomat

== Places ==
- Eik, Agder, a village in Kristiansand municipality in Agder county, Norway
- Eik, Rogaland, a village in Lund municipality in Rogaland county, Norway
- Eik, Vestfold, a neighborhood in Tønsberg municipality in Vestfold county, Norway
- Ełk, a city in eastern Poland pronounce as Eik

== Sport ==
- Egersunds IK, a Norwegian football club
- Eik-Tønsberg, a Norwegian football club
- Enskede IK, a Swedish football club
- Esbjerg Ishockey Klub, a Danish ice hockey team
- Eslövs IK, a Swedish sports club

== Other uses ==
- Eik Banki, a Faroese bank
- Yeysk Airport, in Russia
- Erie Municipal Airport, in Colorado, United States
