= Ministry of Development Cooperation (Norway) =

Government ministry of Norway

The Norwegian Ministry of Development Cooperation (Norwegian: Departementet for utviklingshjelp, DUH) was a Norwegian ministry effective from 1 January 1984 and disestablished 31 December 1989. From 1 January 1990 the ministry was included as a department of the Ministry of Foreign Affairs. Reidun Brusletten served as the Minister of Development Cooperation from 1984 to 1986, Vesla Vetlesen from 1986 to 1988, Kirsti Kolle Grøndahl from 1988 to 1989, and Tom Vraalsen from 1989.
