= Jan Larsen =

Jan Larsen may refer to:

- Jan Larsen (footballer) (1945–1993), Danish football defender
- Jan Larsen (darts player) (born 1954), Danish darts player
- Jan Larsen (swimmer) (born 1967), Danish swimmer
- Jan Kjell Larsen (born 1983), Norwegian football goalkeeper
- Jan Martin Larsen (born 1938), Norwegian cartographer, orienteer and politician
- Jan-Erik Larsen (born 1963), Norwegian editor and politician
