= SEETEP =

SEETEP stands for Solar Energy and Environmental Education Program. It is a project being run in Mawere District located in the Nyanza Province of Kenya. Its purpose is to build a self-sustaining solar energy and water management school in the area by 2016.

== Conception ==
Since 1992 ARC-Aid and ARC-Kenya have been running their development programs in Kenya through offices based in Majiwe District at the ARO Development Centre. In an effort to make the centre more environmentally sustainable a partnership agreement was struck with Elkem Solar. Elkem installed solar panels in ARO Development Centre which is very close to the equator and thus in a prime position for Elkem to simultaneously carry out research and development on the solar panels. The partnership was possible since both ARC-Aid and Elkem Solar are based in Kristiansand.

ARC-Aid has also entered a partnership with Kvadraturen School(also in Kristiansand) which has an alternative energy department. Every year a teacher and some students from this department travel to Kenya to gain some practical experience on solar panel maintenance and installation. Elkem Solar later expanded its installation program and laid down solar panels in Kisumu Polytechnic a technical school located in Nyanza. The interaction of these four partners led to the identification of a need for a school specialising in Solar Energy Technology and Water Resources Management. Elkem Solar would provide technical assistance to the school, Kvadraturen and Kisumu Polytechnic would develop the curriculum for the school while ARC-Aid and ARC-Kenya would coordinate the efforts of the different organisations.

NORAD is funding the project as part of their development activities. Vest-Agder County Municipality has also pledged their support, donating funds and seeking other ways of involvement.

== Progress ==
In 2010 the project officially began with the granting of funds by NORAD for a pilot project and the carrying out of feasibility research. The land on which the school will be built was acquired in 2011. The plot of land is located in Mawere District which is 100 kilometres from Kisumu. Construction has begun on the school using materials that have been developed in Kisumu Polytechnic. A delegation from Kisumu Polytechnic will be visiting Kristiansand in the month of May in order to discuss the way forward with Kvadraturen School and ARC-Aid.
