= Sverre Bugge =

Norwegian politician (born 1953)

Sverre Bugge (born 18 February 1953 in Molde) is a Norwegian politician for the Labour Party.

A cand.jur. by education, he was a lawyer from 1983. From 1990 to 1997 he held various directorships in Oslo Bolig- og Sparelag, and from 1999 he was the director of Skedsmo Boligbyggelag. These are two regional housing cooperatives, and Bugge had been involved in crafting the housing policy of the Labour Party.

He was a member of municipal council of Lørenskog Municipality starting in 1988. During the first cabinet Stoltenberg, Bugge was appointed State Secretary in the Ministry of Local Government upon the resignation of Fatma Jynge. Bugge serves as a deputy representative to the Norwegian Parliament from Akershus during the term 2005–2009.
