= Per Ø. Grimstad =

Norwegian businessperson, diplomat and politician (1934–2021)

Per Øystein Grimstad (7 January 1934 – 22 July 2021) was a Norwegian businessperson, diplomat and politician for the Labour Party.

== Life and career ==
Grimstad was born in Sandnessjøen, and is a siv.ing. by education. He was the CEO of Norconsult from 1980 to 1986, a State Secretary in the Ministry of Industry from 1986 to 1988, director of the Norwegian Agency for Development Cooperation from 1988 to 1996 and the Norwegian ambassador to South Africa from 1996 to 2000.

He used to be married to the singer Birgitte Grimstad. Per Ø. Grimstad died on 22 July 2021, at the age of 87.

Civic offices
Preceded by Nils Vogt	Director of the Norwegian Agency for Development Cooperation; 1988–1996	Succeeded by Arild Eik (acting)
