= Helge Hansen =

Helge Hansen may refer to:

- Helge Hansen (resistance fighter) (1923–2003), a Norwegian resistance fighter during World War II.
- Helge Hansen (general) (born 1936), Inspector of the German Army from 1992 to 1994 and Commander AFCENT from 1994 to 1996.
- Helge Hansen (cyclist) (born 1925), Danish cyclist.
