= March 2021 Rohingya refugee-camp fire =

Rohingya refugee camp fire in Bangladesh

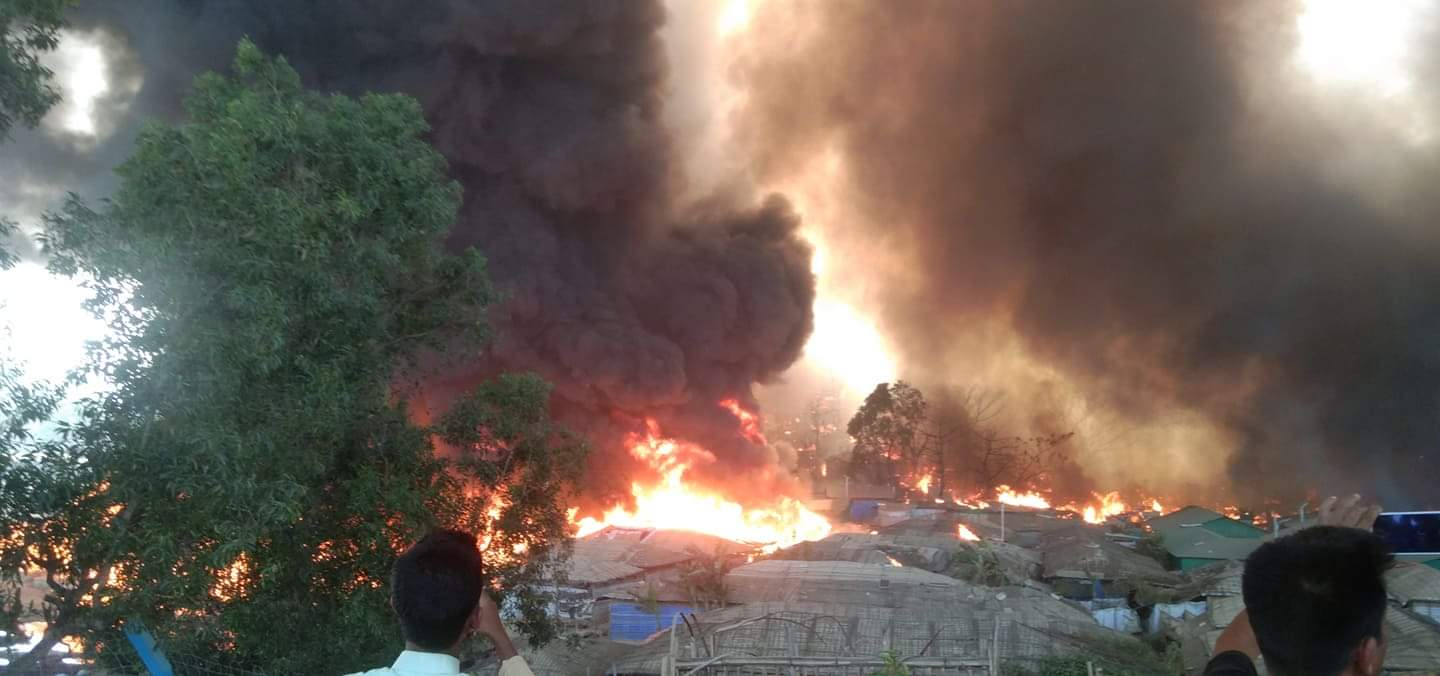
- Date: 22 March 2021
- Location: Balukhali refugee camp, Cox's Bazar, Chittagong Division, Bangladesh; 21.19°N 92.16°E
- Deaths: 15
- Injuries: 560
- Missing: 400

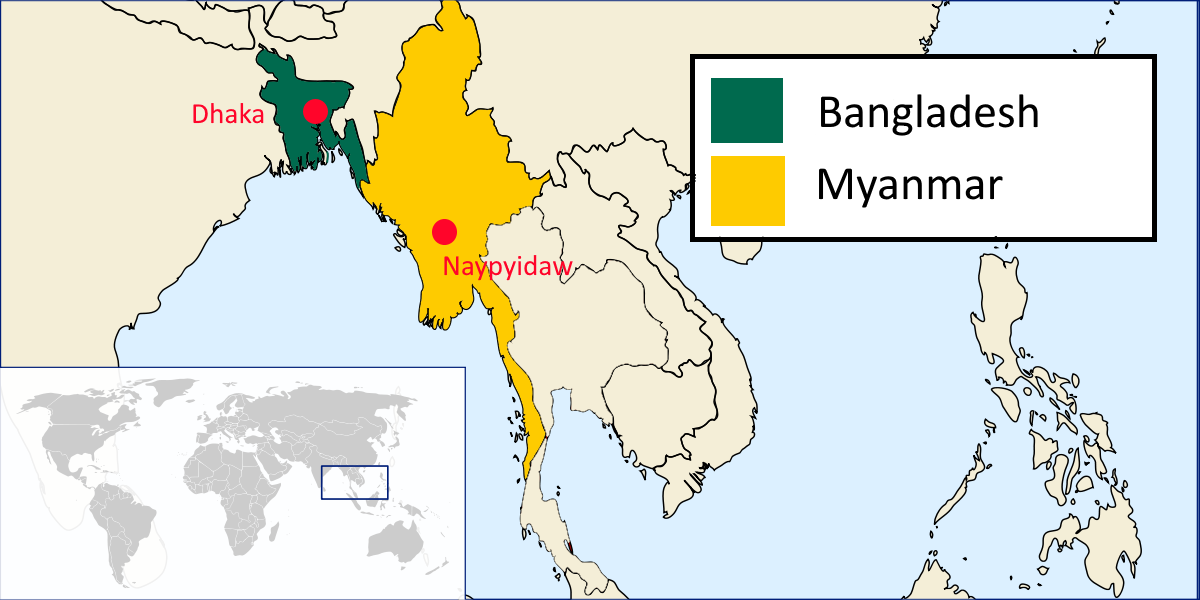
Bangladesh and Myanmar located in Southeast Asia. Red dots denote capital cities of each country.

On 22 March 2021, a fire that had started during the late afternoon in the Balukhali refugee camp in Cox's Bazar, Bangladesh, destroyed a large portion of the camp, killed over a dozen people, and left nearly a thousand injured or missing. Thought to have begun when gas cylinders used for cooking exploded, 100 firemen fought the blaze, which burned for around eight hours until midnight.

The fire displaced roughly 50,000 Rohingya refugees of the genocide in Myanmar and destroyed many buildings, including schools and food storage centres. First responders to the crisis were refugees from the camp itself. By the next day, aid agencies had joined the rescue effort, pledging food, cash, and equipment. Some observers reported that rescue efforts were hindered by barbed-wire fencing around the camp, suggesting that it may have slowed down escapees and possibly contributed to the casualties.

== Background ==
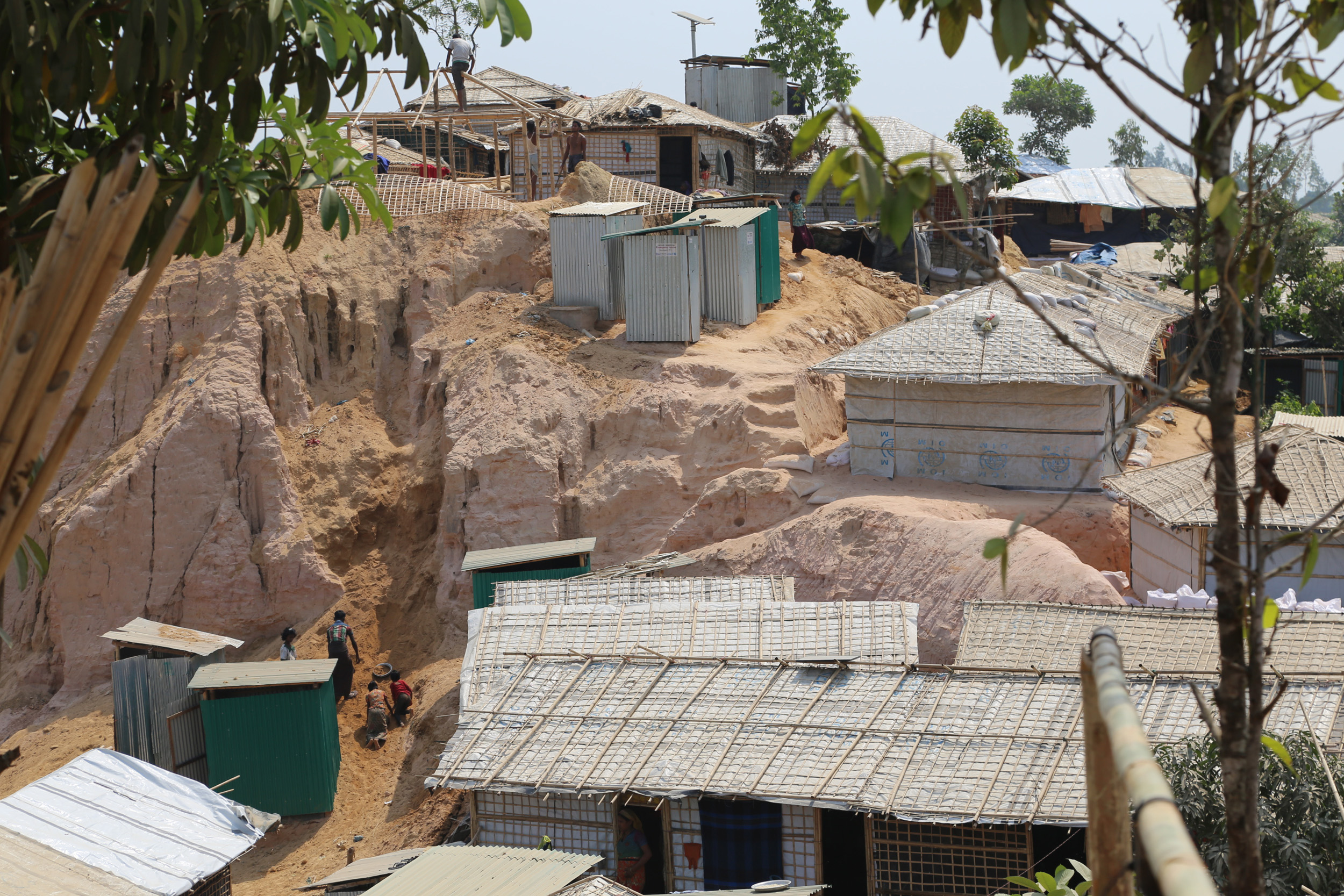
Makeshift shacks in the Balukhali refugee camp in 2018

In 2017, the vast majority of Rohingya people were displaced and became refugees as a result of the genocide. At the peak of the crisis in 2017, over a million Rohingya were forced to flee to other countries. Most fled to Bangladesh while others escaped to India, Thailand, Malaysia, and other parts of South and Southeast Asia. According to the United Nations, as of July 2019, over 742,000 Rohingya people who had fled or been driven out of Rakhine State sought refuge in Bangladesh.

The Balukhali camp is believed to be part of the largest refugee camp in the world, and held approximately one-tenth of Bangladesh's one million Rohingya refugees. The UNHCR regional representative stated that women and children made up the majority of its population. It had experienced a previous large fire in 2017, caused by exploding gas cylinders. Smaller fires had broken out in the two days previously, destroying a number of huts, while January 2021 had seen another fire which had burned down four schools.

The Bangladeshi government has been moving refugees to Bhasan Char island in the Bay of Bengal, a policy widely condemned since the island could easily be submerged by a tropical cyclone. (Note: Critics of the government's plan argue that the island "only emerged from the sea about 20 years ago [and] risks being overwhelmed by storms".)

== Fire ==
During the late afternoon of 22 March 2021 a fire broke out in the Balukhali camp, southwest of Cox's Bazar. Residents later described how it had started in the south and spread with great speed through four blocks, and that panic broke out as people tried to escape.

The World Food Programme said a number of its food distribution warehouses had been destroyed, as had health clinics, mosques, community centres, and a safe space for women run by the International Rescue Committee (IRC). The head of the International Red Cross and Red Crescent Movement delegation in Bangladesh stated over 17,000 shelters—possibly 40,000 and most of them, constructed from bamboo and tarpaulin, makeshift—were destroyed, displacing "tens of thousands of people".

Local reports stated the fire was burning eight hours after it broke out, and continued "well into the night", reported Time magazine. A Rohingya refugee was reported by NPR as telling them how "everything has gone. Thousands are without homes"; conversely, suggested the Catholic Relief Services, it was lucky that the fire had broken out in the afternoon rather than at night, as "people were moving around and children were outside playing, so they could quickly evacuate". The Times of India stated that "at least four teams of firefighters were struggling to control the blaze" and that videos posted to social media showed thick black smoke covering the camp.

== Victims ==
Yesterday before the fire started, my kids went to study at the Islamic school. I did not see them after they came back. I found two of my older kids but I still can’t find my youngest son.

— Shappuni, a Rohingya refugee, Time magazine

First reports indicated that at least 15 people had died, with around another 400 missing, according to the UNHCR, who described it as "massive, it is devastating". The majority of the camp's refugees were women and children, and a government spokesperson confirmed that a number of the dead were children and that many of the missing were buried in the rubble. The UNHCR also suggested that 560 people had been injured and 45,000 displaced.

== Investigation ==
The cause of the fire was unknown, although under investigation by Bangladesh Police. A number of human rights observers criticised the placement of barbed wire around the camp, arguing that it had prevented people—"including especially vulnerable women and girls", said the IRC—from fleeing the fire, and perhaps contributed to the death toll. Jan Egeland of the Norwegian Refugee Council (NRC) argued that "this tragic event could have been less disastrous had barbed wire fencing not been erected encircling the camps. NRC staff have heard horrific accounts from refugees about their scramble to cut through the wire fences to save their families, escape the fire and reach safety". Police, however, rejected the claims regarding barbed wire, (Note: However, AFP noted that they had not been able to "independently... verify the claims about the fence".) and a government spokesman, reported Channel News Asia, stated that "the fencing was not a major issue", blaming the speed with which the fire spread rather than the barbed-wire fencing for casualties.

External image
- Aftermath of fire, taken 23 March 2021

Also questioned was why fires appeared to start with relative frequency, with a local fire brigade official stating three fires had occurred in four days; Amnesty International stated that, in their view, the "frequency of fire in the camps is too coincidental, especially when outcomes of previous investigations into the incidents are not known and they keep repeating", while a spokesman for the refugees noted that "It is not clear why these fire incidents are happening repeatedly in the camps". CBS reported that Bangladesh suspects arson, noting that "officials there say it's too much of a coincidence to have so many fires in such a short time period". Although the fire had died down within 48 hours, its cause was still unknown.

== Response ==
The World Food Programme (WFP) believed up to 87,500 people would ultimately be affected by the fire, with the International Red Cross and Red Crescent Movement putting the figure at 123,000. (Note: Time noted that "the differing figures could not immediately be reconciled".) Aid agencies said the situation would remain critical due to the proximity of the cyclone season.

=== Foreign aid ===
First responders to the fire were Rohingya refugees themselves. The Voice of America reported that multiple aid agencies dispatched "emergency assistance". The spokesperson of the United Nations High Commissioner for Refugees reported that he had "never before seen anything as massive and devastating", and that ground-based teams were carrying out a search and rescue operation in the rubble. UNICEF operatives were also working in the camp, both administering immediate first aid and assisting with rehousing where possible. Relief and rescue operations were coordinated by the International Organization for Migration (IOM), who provided one million dollars for the relief effort. (Note: However, the IOM also believed that another 20 million dollars would be needed to just to rectify the most urgent problems.) while the WFP dispatched a shipment of high-energy biscuits to the camp, and had arranged for 60,000 hot meals to be provided by the following day. On 25 March 2021, the UN's Central Emergency Response Fund (CERF) released $14 Million to rebuild shelter and provide affected people with food, water and sanitation services, and other emergency support.
