= Solbakken =

Solbakken is a Norwegian surname.

It can refer to:

- Bjarne Solbakken, alpine skier
- Erik Solbakken, television presenter
- Erik André Solbakken, competitive rower
- Håvard Solbakken, cross country skier
- Hege Solbakken, politician
- Ola Solbakken, football player
- Solveig Solbakken, politician
- Ståle Solbakken, football player and manager
- Synnøve Solbakken (politician), politician
