= Dagny Gärtner Hovig =

Norwegian politician

Dagny Gärtner Hovig (born 5 March 1945) is a Norwegian politician for the Labour Party.

She was born in Molde as a daughter of an engineer and a midwife, and grew up in Kristiansund. After finishing her secondary education in 1965, she held different jobs, including au pair, receptionist and secretary. From 1973 to 1980 she held "various assignments" at the Norwegian Institute of International Affairs, taking a cand.mag. degree in 1977 and studying political science at master's level until 1979. From 1980 to 1991 she was an information consultant in Oslo Municipality, the Norwegian State Railways and Norges Kommunalbank.

Hovig was a member of Oslo city council from 1983 to 1989. In 1991 she was a municipal commissioner, before a stint as secretary for the mayor from 1992 to 1993. Within her party, she chaired the Østre Arbeidersamfunn from 1982 to 1984 and Manglerud Labour Party from 1993 to 1998, as well as a multitude of other memberships in internal committees and policy workgroups. She was also active in the European Movement ahead of the 1994 EU membership referendum.

Hovig was elected as a deputy representative to the Parliament of Norway from Oslo during the terms 1993–1997 and 1997–2001. Almost her entire first term, from October 1993 until December 1996, she met as a regular member of Parliament, deputizing for Grete Faremo and Bjørn Tore Godal. During her three-year spell she sat on the Standing Committee on Scrutiny and Constitutional Affairs.

Returning to a civic career, after brief stints in Drammen Municipality and Folketeaterbygningen AS she became director of information in Oslo Municipality's Bureau of Planning and Construction from 1999. She held this job until retiring in 2012.

She was a deputy board member of Oslo Port Authority from 1984 to 1987 and chaired its board from 1992 to 1996, deputy board member of Stor-Oslo Lokaltrafikk from 1988 to 1991, board member of Oslo Cathedral School from 1992 to 1996, and chaired the corporate council of Vinmonopolet from 1998 to 2006. Within the cultural sphere, she was a board member of the Norwegian Museum of Decorative Arts and Design from 1988 to 1991, board member of Oslo City Museum from 1992 to 1996 and chair from 1997 to 2003, deputy board member of Nationaltheatret from 1997 to 1999, and board member of Kunst på Arbeidsplassen from 2005.
