= Hilde Frafjord Johnson =

Norwegian politician

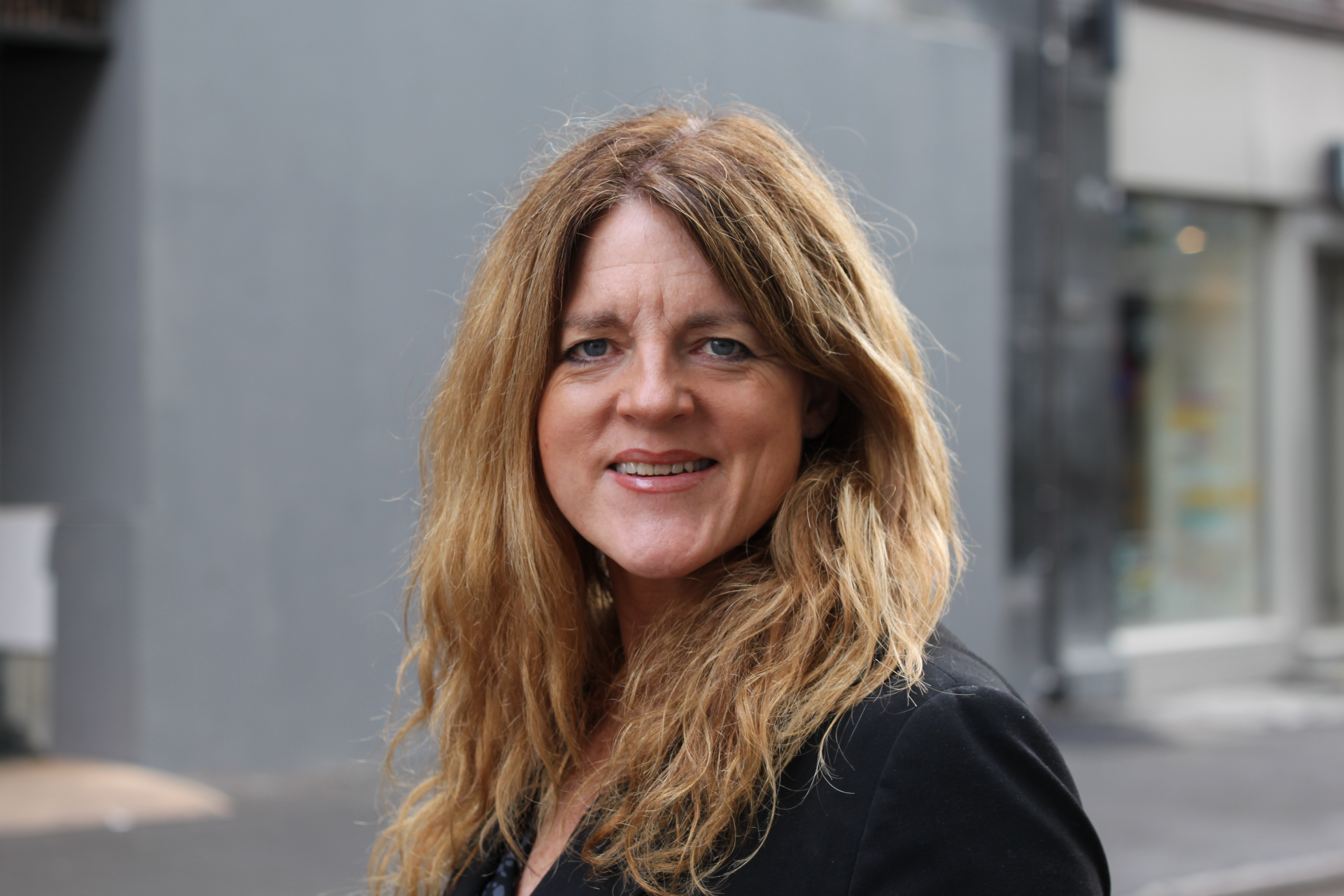

Special Representative of the Secretary-General for South Sudan
- In office 8 July 2011 – July 2014
- Secretary-General: Ban Ki-moon
- Preceded by: Office established
- Succeeded by: Ellen Margrethe Løj

Minister of International Development
- In office 19 October 2001 – 17 October 2005
- Prime Minister: Kjell Magne Bondevik
- Preceded by: Anne Kristin Sydnes
- Succeeded by: Erik Solheim
- In office 17 October 1997 – 17 March 2000
- Prime Minister: Kjell Magne Bondevik
- Preceded by: Kari Nordheim-Larsen
- Succeeded by: Anne Kristin Sydnes

Personal details
- Born: 29 August 1963 (age 63) Arusha, Tanganyika
- Party: Christian Democratic
- Education: University of Oslo

Hilde Frafjord Johnson (Note: In this article, the surname is Johnson.) (born 29 August 1963 in Arusha, Tanganyika) is a Norwegian politician from the Christian Democratic Party. She is a former Minister of International Development of Norway, and member of the Norwegian Government. She most recently served as the Special Representative of the Secretary-General and Head of the United Nations Mission in the Republic of South Sudan, completing her term in July 2014

== Early life and education ==
Born in Arusha, Taganyika (modern-day Tanzania) to parents who worked for the Norwegian Missionary Society, she came to Norway at the age of 7. She was awarded a Cand. polit. degree at the University of Oslo in 1991, specializing in development anthropology.

== Career ==
Becoming a member of the Young Christian Democrats at age 16, she was elected to the Parliament of Norway for the Christian Democratic Party from Rogaland in 1993 and re-elected in 1997. She served as a member of the Standing Committee on Energy and the Environment. She served as Minister of International Development in Bondevik's First Cabinet from October 1997 to March 2000 and held the same position in Bondevik's Second Cabinet from October 2001 to October 2005.

As minister, Hilde F. Johnson played a pivotal role in the peace process in Sudan, leading to the completion of the Comprehensive Peace Agreement between government and the Sudan People’s Liberation Army/Movement in 2005. She has engaged in peace building efforts and post crisis-transition processes in relation to a number of countries in Africa, Asia and Central America, notably the Horn of Africa, Sudan, Afghanistan, Sri Lanka, Timor Leste, Guatemala and the Great Lakes-region.

She has been involved in efforts to build coalitions for change, both of the UN, in the Bretton Woods Institutions (BWIs) and bilateral aid. In 1998, Johnson initiated the Utstein-group, a group of key likeminded development ministers from the UK, the Netherlands, Germany and Norway to spearhead this agenda. She worked closely with the senior leadership of the UN, the International Financial Institutions and the World Trade Organization (WTO) and leaders of developing countries, to bring about better pro-poor development policies. She has served as Governor and member of the Board of the World Bank for Norway and the Nordic/Baltic Constituency.

Prior to joining UNICEF she served as senior advisor to the president of the African Development Bank in charge of Fragile States policies. Johnson was the co-chair of the Global Coalition for Africa for several years. She was selected a Global Leader of Tomorrow by the World Economic Forum in 2001 . She was member of the High Level Commission on Legal Empowerment of the Poor led by Madeleine Albright, and has served as a member of the Oxford University Taskforce on UK Energy, Development Assistance and Foreign Policy, led by Chris Patten. Johnson was a member of the UNDP hosted Commission on Legal Empowerment of the Poor.

Johnson served as deputy executive director of the United Nations Children’s Fund (UNICEF)from 2007 to 2011. In this capacity she was in charge of global partnerships and the organization’s humanitarian operations and crisis response all over the world and worked closely with the heads of UN-agencies and NGOs to improve delivery on the ground. She also had the responsibility for overseeing programmes in the areas of child protection and child rights. Hilde F. Johnson has facilitated and led campaigns in several areas among a broad spectrum of stakeholders. These include, for example, Education for All, Children in Armed Conflict and Sexual Violence in Conflict (chairing the network UN Action, spearheading the efforts of the UN-family).

Following her assignment in South Sudan, Johnson served as a member of the UN Secretary General's High Level Panel on Peace Operations (HIPPO) (2014-2015) and was a Senior Fellow at the Norwegian Institute of International Affairs (NUPI) (2015). She was appointed Secretary General of the Christian Democratic party in Norway in early 2016.

== Other activities ==
- Berghof Foundation, Member of the Board of Trustees

== Publications ==
Hilde F. Johnson is the author of three books:

Johnson, Hilde F.: “Waging Peace in Sudan, The Inside Story of the Negotiations that Ended Africa's Longest Civil War”, Sussex Academic Press, January 2011

Johnson, Hilde F.: “South Sudan, The Untold Story – from Independence to Civil War”, IB Tauris, London, June 2016

Johnson, Hilde Frafjord: “Den vanskelige freden: Når fred blir til ny krig”, Cappelen forlag, October 2016.

Other publications:

Johnson, Hilde Frafjord: “Protection of Civilians in the United Nations: A peacekeeping illusion?”, article in Cedric de Cloning & Mateja Peter: “United Nations Peace Operations in a Changing Global Order”, September 2001

Johnson, Hilde: «Dilemmas in Development: Forms of peasant resistance among the Fipa in Rukwa, Tanzania”, thesis, University of Oslo, Jan 1991.

== Notes ==
Political offices
Preceded by Anne Kristin Sydnes	Minister of International Development; 2001–2005	Succeeded by Erik Solheim
Preceded by Kari Nordheim-Larsen	Minister of International Development; 1997–2000	Succeeded by Anne Kristin Sydnes
