= Grete Knudsen =

Norwegian politician (1940–2023)

Minister of Trade and Industry
- In office 17 March 2000 – 19 October 2001
- Prime Minister: Jens Stoltenberg
- Preceded by: Lars Sponheim
- Succeeded by: Ansgar Gabrielsen
- In office 1 January 1997 – 17 October 1997
- Prime Minister: Thorbjørn Jagland
- Preceded by: Finn Kristensen (Minister of Industry)
- Succeeded by: Lars Sponheim

Minister of Nordic Cooperation
- In office 25 October 1996 – 17 October 1997
- Prime Minister: Thorbjørn Jagland
- Preceded by: Gunnar Berge
- Succeeded by: Ragnhild Haarstad

Minister of Trade and Shipping
- In office 24 January 1994 – 25 October 1996
- Prime Minister: Gro Harlem Brundtland
- Preceded by: Bjørn Tore Godal
- Succeeded by: Position abolished

Minister of Social Affairs
- In office 4 September 1992 – 24 January 1994
- Prime Minister: Gro Harlem Brundtland
- Preceded by: Tove Veierød
- Succeeded by: Hill-Marta Solberg

State Secretary for the Ministry of Education and Church Affairs
- In office 17 October 1979 – 14 October 1981
- Prime Minister: Odvar Nordli; Gro Harlem Brundtland
- Minister: Einar Førde

Member of the Norwegian Parliament
- In office 1 October 1981 – 30 September 2001
- Constituency: Hordaland

Personal details
- Born: 13 October 1940 Bergen, Hordaland, German-occupied Norway
- Died: 4 December 2023 (aged 83)
- Party: Labour
- Spouse(s): Gjert Henning Knudsen (m. 1969); Jørgen Berlund (m. 1963, div. 1966)

Grete Knudsen (13 October 1940 – 4 December 2023) was a Norwegian politician for the Labour Party. She was the state secretary to the Minister of Education and Church Affairs 1979–1981, Minister of Social Affairs 1992–1994, Minister of Foreign Affairs (trade and shipping affairs) 1994–1996, Minister of Industry and Energy (industry affairs) 1996, Minister of Industry and Trade 1997, as well as Minister of Nordic cooperation 1996–1997, and Minister of Industry and Trade 2000–2001 in the first cabinet Stoltenberg. Knudsen was a teacher before her political career, and worked as principal of a special education school in Bergen.

In 2008 she was appointed a member of the board of the National Gallery of Norway.

On 13 August 2013, she released a book, Basketak (Brawl) that Stein Kåre Kristiansen (a political commentator for TV2) called "This is an unpleasant package of shit in the middle of the election campaign. This does not suit the Labour Party well." On the same day Jan-Erik Larsen said that he had spoken to party leaders at the lowest level, from all over Norway, and the verdict is clear: This is what the party needed the least, at the moment.

Knudsen died on 4 December 2023, at the age of 83.
