= First Stoltenberg cabinet =

Government of Norway from 2000 to 2001

Stoltenberg's First Cabinet
- Cabinet of Norway

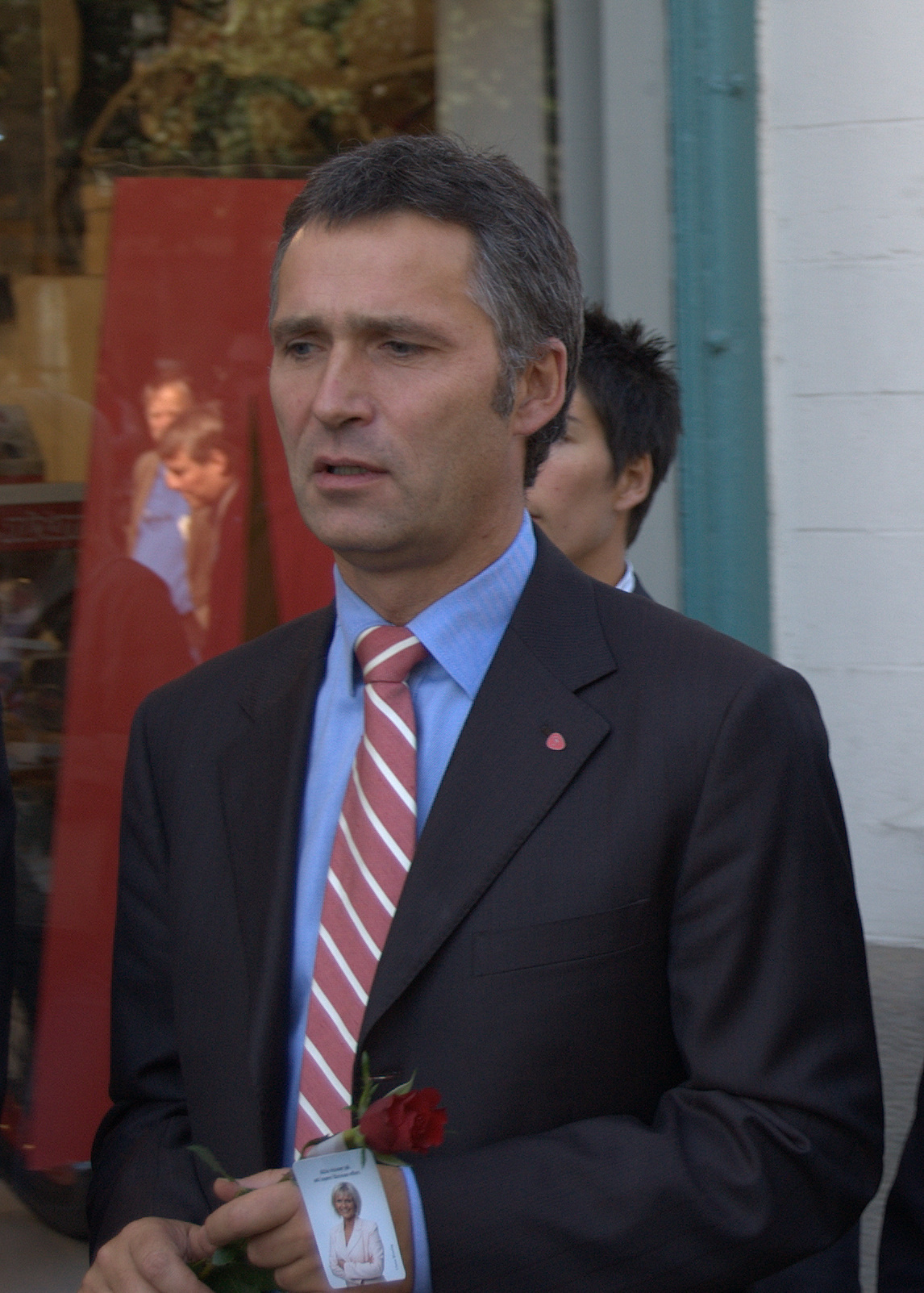
- Date formed: 17 March 2000
- Date dissolved: 19 October 2001

People and organisations
- King: Harald V of Norway
- Prime Minister: Jens Stoltenberg
- Total no. of members: 19
- Member party: Labour Party
- Status in legislature: Minority government

History
- Outgoing formation: 2001 parliamentary election
- Election: 1997 parliamentary election
- Legislature term: 1997–2001
- Predecessor: Bondevik's First Cabinet
- Successor: Bondevik's Second Cabinet

Stoltenberg's First Cabinet governed Norway between 17 March 2000 and 19 October 2001. The Labour Party cabinet was led by Prime Minister Jens Stoltenberg. It had the following composition.

== Cabinet members ==
Cabinet
Portfolio	Minister	Took office	Left office	Party
Prime Minister	Jens Stoltenberg	17 March 2000	19 October 2001	Labour
Minister of Foreign Affairs	Thorbjørn Jagland	17 March 2000	19 October 2001	Labour
Minister of Finance	Karl Eirik Schjøtt-Pedersen	17 March 2000	19 October 2001	Labour
Minister of Defence	Bjørn Tore Godal	17 March 2000	19 October 2001	Labour
Minister of Justice and the Police	Hanne Harlem	17 March 2000	19 October 2001	Labour
Minister of Transport and Communications	Terje Moe Gustavsen	17 March 2000	19 October 2001	Labour
Minister of Local Government and Regional Development	Sylvia Brustad	17 March 2000	19 October 2001	Labour
Minister of Education and Church Affairs	Trond Giske	17 March 2000	19 October 2001	Labour
Minister of Culture	Ellen Horn	17 March 2000	19 October 2001	Labour
Minister of Social Affairs	Guri Ingebrigtsen	17 March 2000	19 October 2001	Labour
Minister of Health	Tore Tønne	17 March 2000	19 October 2001	Labour
Minister of Children and Family Affairs	Karita Bekkemellem	17 March 2000	19 October 2001	Labour
Minister of Labour and Government Administration; Minister of Nordic Cooperation	Jørgen Kosmo (Note: Sylvia Brustad was acting minister from 5–19 October 2001.)	17 March 2000	5 October 2001	Labour
Minister of International Development	Anne Kristin Sydnes	17 March 2000	19 October 2001	Labour
Minister of Agriculture	Bjarne Håkon Hanssen	17 March 2000	19 October 2001	Labour
Minister of Trade and Industry	Grete Knudsen	17 March 2000	19 October 2001	Labour
Minister of the Environment	Siri Bjerke	17 March 2000	19 October 2001	Labour
Minister of Petroleum and Energy	Olav Akselsen	17 March 2000	19 October 2001	Labour
Minister of Fisheries	Otto Gregussen	17 March 2000	19 October 2001	Labour

== State Secretaries ==
Ministry	State Secretary	Period (Note: Unless otherwise noted, the period was 17 March 2000 – 19 October 2001.)	Party
Office of the Prime Minister	Jonas Gahr Støre		Labour
Office of the Prime Minister	Norvald Mo	24 March 2000 –	Labour
Office of the Prime Minister	Hege Marie Norheim	24 March 2000 – 13 October 2000	Labour
Office of the Prime Minister	Jan-Erik Larsen	31 March 2000 –	Labour
Office of the Prime Minister	Tom Therkildsen	8 May 2000 –	Labour
Office of the Prime Minister	Lisbeth Berg-Hansen	20 October 2000 –	Labour
Ministry of Foreign Affairs	Mona Juul		Labour
Ministry of Foreign Affairs	Espen Barth Eide		Labour
Ministry of Foreign Affairs	Raymond Johansen		Labour
Ministry of Foreign Affairs	Sigrun Møgedal	27 March 2000 –	Labour
Ministry of Foreign Affairs	Jan Bøhler	26 January 2001 –	Labour
Ministry of Defence	Øystein Singsaas		Labour
Ministry of Industry and Trade	Britt Schultz		Labour
Ministry of Industry and Trade	Olav Soleng	24 March 2000 – 2 February 2001	Labour
Ministry of Industry and Trade	Tore Onshuus Sandvik	2 February 2000 –	Labour
Ministry of Labour and Government Administration	Reidun Wallevik	24 March 2000 – 28 July 2000	Labour
Ministry of Labour and Government Administration	Marianne Seip Haugsnes	28 July 2000 –	Labour
Ministry of Finance	Vidar Ovesen	24 March 2000 –	Labour
Ministry of Finance	Ellen Mo	3 April 2000 –	Labour
Ministry of Finance	Hege Marie Norheim	13 October 2000 –	Labour
Ministry of Local Government and Regional Development	Steinar Pedersen		Labour
Ministry of Local Government and Regional Development	Audun Tron		Labour
Ministry of Local Government and Regional Development	Fatma Jynge	– 31 March 2000	Labour
Ministry of Local Government and Regional Development	Sverre Bugge	31 March 2000 –	Labour
Ministry of Local Government and Regional Development	Einar Gelius	11 December 2000 –	Labour
Ministry of Social Affairs and Health	Tore Hagebakken	24 March 2000 –	Labour
Ministry of Social Affairs and Health	Lars Erik Flatø	31 March 2000 –	Labour
Ministry of Culture	Roger Ingebrigtsen	31 March 2000 –	Labour
Ministry of Transport and Communications	Eirin Kristin Sund		Labour
Ministry of Fisheries	Ellen Bergli		Labour
Ministry of the Environment	Stein Lier-Hansen	24 March 2000 –	Labour
Ministry of Agriculture	Sveinung Valle	24 March 2000 –	Labour
Ministry of Justice and Police	Øystein Mæland	24 March 2000 –	Labour
Ministry of Justice and Police	Anne Lise Ryel	31 March 2000 –	Labour
Ministry of Children and Family Affairs	Solveig Solbakken		Labour
Ministry of Petroleum and Energy	Bjørg Kirsten Sandal	7 April 2000 –	Labour
Ministry of Church Affairs, Education and Research	Berith Bergersen	– 1 June 2001	Labour
Ministry of Church Affairs, Education and Research	Randi Øverland	27 March 2000 –	Labour
Ministry of Church Affairs, Education and Research	Nina Tangnæs Grønvold	1 June 2000 –	Labour

Preceded by Kjell Magne Bondevik's first term as Prime Minister of Norway	Norwegian Council of State; 2000–2001	Succeeded by Kjell Magne Bondevik's second term as Prime Minister of Norway
