= Cabinet Stoltenberg =

Cabinet Stoltenberg may refer to:

- First cabinet Stoltenberg
- Second cabinet Stoltenberg
