= Arild Eik =

Arild Eik (16 September 1943 – 6 March 2009) was a Norwegian development aid worker and diplomat.

His first ambassador post was in Tanzania. From 1996 to early 1997 he was acting director of the Norwegian Agency for Development Cooperation.

In the summer of 1997 he was promoted from assisting director of the Norwegian Agency for Development Cooperation to Norwegian ambassador in Zimbabwe. From February 1998 he was also the ambassador to Botswana, and from March 1998 he was also the ambassador to Mauritius. In 2002 he was moved to Malaysia, and from March 2003 he was also the ambassador to Brunei.

He was decorated as a Knight, First Class of the Royal Norwegian Order of St. Olav in 1995. He died in March 2009.

Civic offices
| Preceded by Per Ø. Grimstad | Director of the Norwegian Agency for Development Cooperation (acting); 1996–1997 | Succeeded by Tove Strand |
