= Ellen Bergli =

Norwegian politician (born 1945)

Ellen Bergli (born 27 October 1945) is a Norwegian politician for the Labour Party.

She served as a deputy representative to the Norwegian Parliament from Troms during the term 1997–2001.

Between 2000 and 2001, during the first cabinet Stoltenberg, she was appointed State Secretary in the Ministry of Fisheries.
