= Nils Vogt (civil servant) =

Norwegian civil servant and diplomat

Nils Vogt (1926–2000) was a Norwegian civil servant and diplomat.

He was born in Hakadal, and is a cand.jur. by education. During World War II, while still in secondary school, he was imprisoned in Grini concentration camp between 10 June and 20 September 1943.

He worked at the Norwegian embassy in the United States from 1957 to 1961, for Norges Eksportråd from 1961 to 1965, at the Norwegian embassy in Belgium from 1965 to 1966 and as vice president of Federation of Norwegian Industries from 1966 to 1972. In 1972 he was assistant secretary in the Norwegian Ministry of Industry, from 1973 to 1975 he worked in the Norwegian Petroleum Directorate and from 1975 to 1980 he worked with petroleum at the Norwegian embassy in Iran. He was assisting director and director in the Norwegian Agency for Development Cooperation (Norad) from 1980 to 1984 and 1984 to 1988, before rounding off his career as the Norad representative in Maputo.

Civic offices
Preceded by Borger A. Lenth	Director of the Norwegian Agency for Development Cooperation; 1984–1988	Succeeded by Per Ø. Grimstad
