= Steinar Pedersen (politician) =

Norwegian politician

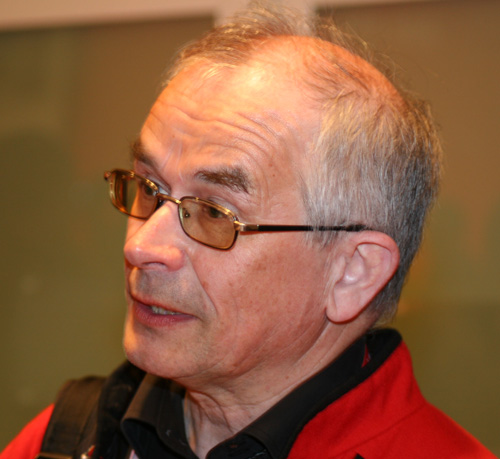
Steinar Pedersen in 2007

Steinar Pedersen (born 2 March 1947 in Tana) is a Norwegian politician for the Labour Party.

He served as a deputy representative to the Norwegian Parliament from Finnmark during the term 1993–1997. During the first cabinet Stoltenberg, Pedersen was appointed State Secretary in the Ministry of Local Government. From 1989 to 2005 he was a member of the Sami Parliament of Norway.

In 2006 he took the dr.philos. degree in history, with the paper Lappekodisillen i nord 1751-1859. He is the current rector of the Sámi University College.

Steinar Pedersen is the uncle of Helga Pedersen.
