= Leif Vetlesen =

Norwegian sailor, political worker, organizational worker and writer

Leif Vetlesen (7 August 1921 – 18 May 2003) was a Norwegian sailor, political worker, organizational worker and writer.

He was born in Kristiania as a son of engineer Alf Vetlesen (1878–1963) and teacher Aagot Bugge (1881–1967). He was a great-grandson of Frederik Moltke Bugge. He finished his secondary education at Oslo Cathedral School in 1939, and then went to sea. He was going to return to land after one year, but when Norway was involved in World War II in April 1940, their merchant fleet became a crucial asset in the war and Vetlesen stayed. He worked at sea for several years, but while hospitalized with jaundice in Cardiff, he became involved with the British Communist Party. As he became known as a good speaker, he was hired in the trade union Norwegian Seafarers' Union in 1944.

After the war he launched a campaign for better treatment of war sailors, but his agitation led to him being fired from the union in 1947. In 1949 he was also excluded from the Young Communist League of Norway. His marriage since 1943 to Lorna Dilys Peaty also ended in 1949; in 1951 he married Vesla Gunvor Hansen. After the Soviet invasion of Hungary he renounced Communism and joined the Norwegian Labour Party together with his wife.

Vetlesen held various jobs, both as a manual worker and electoral campaigner for the Labour Party, before being hired as information director in the Norwegian Agency for Development Cooperation. He remained here until 1982 except for three years from 1968 to 1971 in Uganda. From 1982 to 1985 he was secretary-general of Amnesty International Norway. His wife was a government minister from 1986 to 1988.

Vetlesen's former work for war sailors was taken up by Thore Horve during the 1960s, and led to an ex gratia monetary payment to sailors in 1972. Vetlesen released several books about the topic, including Sjøfolkenes kamp for det hemmelige fond (1949), Reis ingen monumenter. Kampen om Nortraships hemmelige fond (1981), Med døden i kjølvannet. Av en krigsseilers saga (1989) and Syv fortellinger fra Norges krig på havet (with others, 1993). He also wrote two books about the Communist Party and Peder Furubotn. He was decorated with the HM The King's Medal of Merit in gold in 1997, and died in May 2003 in Oslo.
