= Bjørn Tore Godal =

Norwegian politician

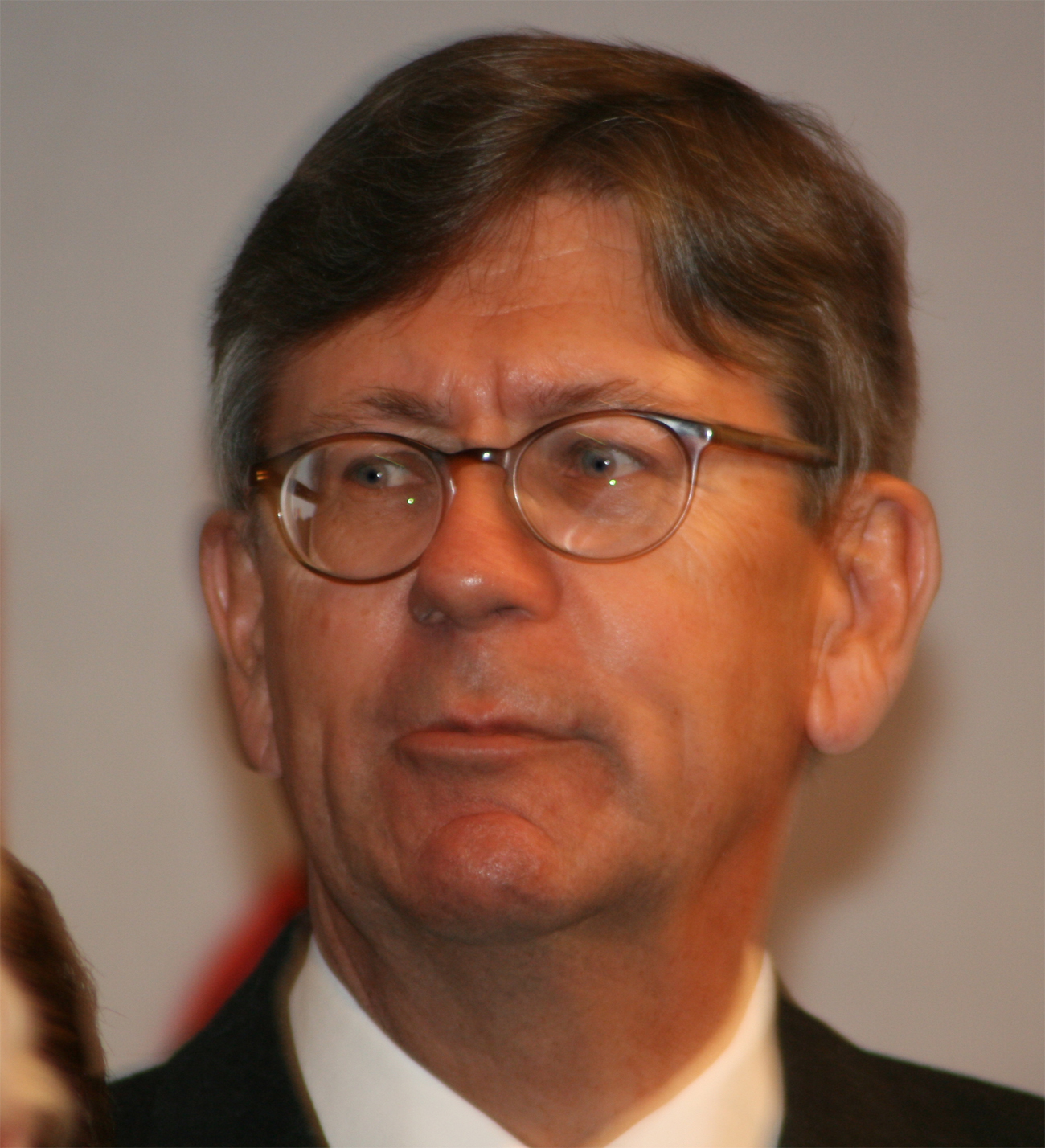
- Godal in 2009

Minister of Defence
- In office 17 March 2000 – 19 October 2001
- Prime Minister: Jens Stoltenberg
- Preceded by: Eldbjørg Løwer
- Succeeded by: Kristin Krohn Devold

Minister of Foreign Affairs
- In office 24 January 1994 – 17 October 1997
- Prime Minister: Gro Harlem Brundtland; Thorbjørn Jagland
- Preceded by: Johan Jørgen Holst
- Succeeded by: Knut Vollebæk

Minister of Trade and Shipping
- In office 15 November 1991 – 24 January 1994
- Prime Minister: Gro Harlem Brundtland
- Preceded by: Eldrid Nordbø
- Succeeded by: Grete Knudsen

Member of the Norwegian Parliament
- In office 1 October 1989 – 30 September 2001
- Constituency: Oslo

Personal details
- Born: 20 January 1945 (age 81) Skien, Telemark, Norway
- Party: Labour
- Spouse(s): Sissel Rønbeck (1971-1981); Gro Balas (1988–present)

Bjørn Tore Godal (born 20 January 1945) is a Norwegian politician for the Labour Party. He was Minister of Foreign Affairs from 1994–1997 and Minister of Defence from 2000–2001 in Stoltenberg's First Cabinet. From 2003-2007 he was the Norwegian ambassador to Germany. Since 2007, he has acted as special adviser to the Norwegian State Department in international energy and climate issues.

== Honours ==
- Knight Grand Cross of the Order of St Michael and St George, 1994
- Grand Cross of the Order of Civil Merit, 1995

Political offices
Preceded by Johan Jørgen Holst	Minister of Foreign Affairs; 1994–1997	Succeeded by Knut Vollebæk
Diplomatic posts
Preceded by Morten Wetland	Norwegian ambassador to Germany; 2003–2007	Succeeded by Sven-Erik Svedman
