= Kari Nordheim-Larsen =

Norwegian politician

County Governor of Telemark
- In office 2006 – 31 December 2018
- Monarch: Harald V
- Prime Minister: Jens Stoltenberg; Erna Solberg
- Preceded by: Solveig Sollie
- Succeeded by: Office merged with Vestfold

Minister of International Development
- In office 4 September 1992 – 17 October 1997
- Prime Minister: Gro Harlem Brundtland; Thorbjørn Jagland
- Preceded by: Grete Faremo
- Succeeded by: Hilde Frafjord Johnson

Personal details
- Born: 23 June 1948 (age 78) Holla Municipality, Telemark, Norway
- Party: Labour

Kari Nordheim-Larsen (born 23 June 1948) is a Norwegian politician for the Labour Party. She was Minister of International Development from 1992 to 1997. She was also acting Minister of Children and Family Affairs from 1993 to 1994. From 2006 to 2018, Nordheim-Larsen was County Governor of Telemark.

Government offices
Preceded by Solveig Sollie (Arne Malme was acting governor from 2004-2006)	County Governor of Telemark; 2006–2018	Office abolished Merged into County Governor of Vestfold og Telemark
