= Hege Marie Norheim =

Norwegian businessperson

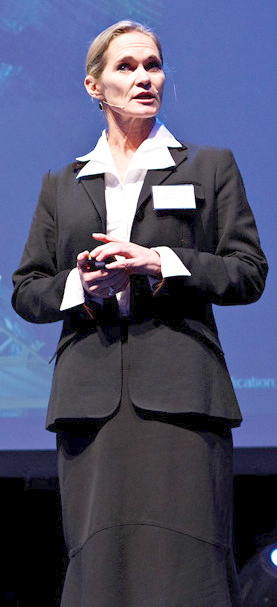
- Speaking at a Norwegian Oil and Gas conference in 2011
- Born: 1967 (age 58–59)
- Education: Norwegian School of Economics; University of St. Gallen
- Occupations: Businessperson, politician
- Political party: Labour

Hege Marie Norheim (born 1967) is a Norwegian businessperson. She is a former politician for the Labour Party.

== Career ==
She grew up in Gjøvik and took her education at the Norwegian School of Economics and University of St. Gallen. In her younger days she played handball.

She was a civil servant in the Office of the Prime Minister for five years before being appointed to the political leadership. That happened in March 2000, when Norheim was appointed as a State Secretary. She moved to the Ministry of Finance in October 2000, where she served until Stoltenberg's First Cabinet fell in October 2001.

Norheim did not continue in politics after that, and was hired in Norsk Hydro, later merged into the company StatoilHydro, and later renamed Equinor. In 2005 she was also elected as a vice president of the World Petroleum Congress, as the first woman ever. In 2009 she was named as director of StatoilHydro's "initiative for the Northern areas", interpreted as the endeavor to open Lofoten, Vesterålen and Senja for petroleum drilling.

Norheim was the director of governmental contact and sustainability in Freyr until 2024, when she changed companies to Sopra Steria Footprint.

She has been a board member of Det Norske Teatret, the Norwegian Refugee Council, Tomra, Nordea and the Global Battery Alliance.
