= Balukhali refugee camp =

Balukhali refugee camp বালুখালি শরণার্থী শিবির
- Interactive map of Balukhali refugee camp
- Coordinates: 21.19°N 92.16°E
- Country: Bangladesh
- Division: Chittagong Division
- District: Cox's Bazar District

Balukhali refugee camp (Bengali: বালুখালি শরণার্থী শিবির, romanized: Balukhali shoronarthi shibir) is a Rohingya refugee camp in Cox's Bazar, Bangladesh. The International Organization for Migration refers to the collective settlement of Balukhali and neighbouring Kutupalong refugee camp as the Kutupalong–Balukhali expansion site.

In March 2021, a massive fire destroyed much of the camp, killing over a dozen people and further displacing thousands.

== Gallery ==
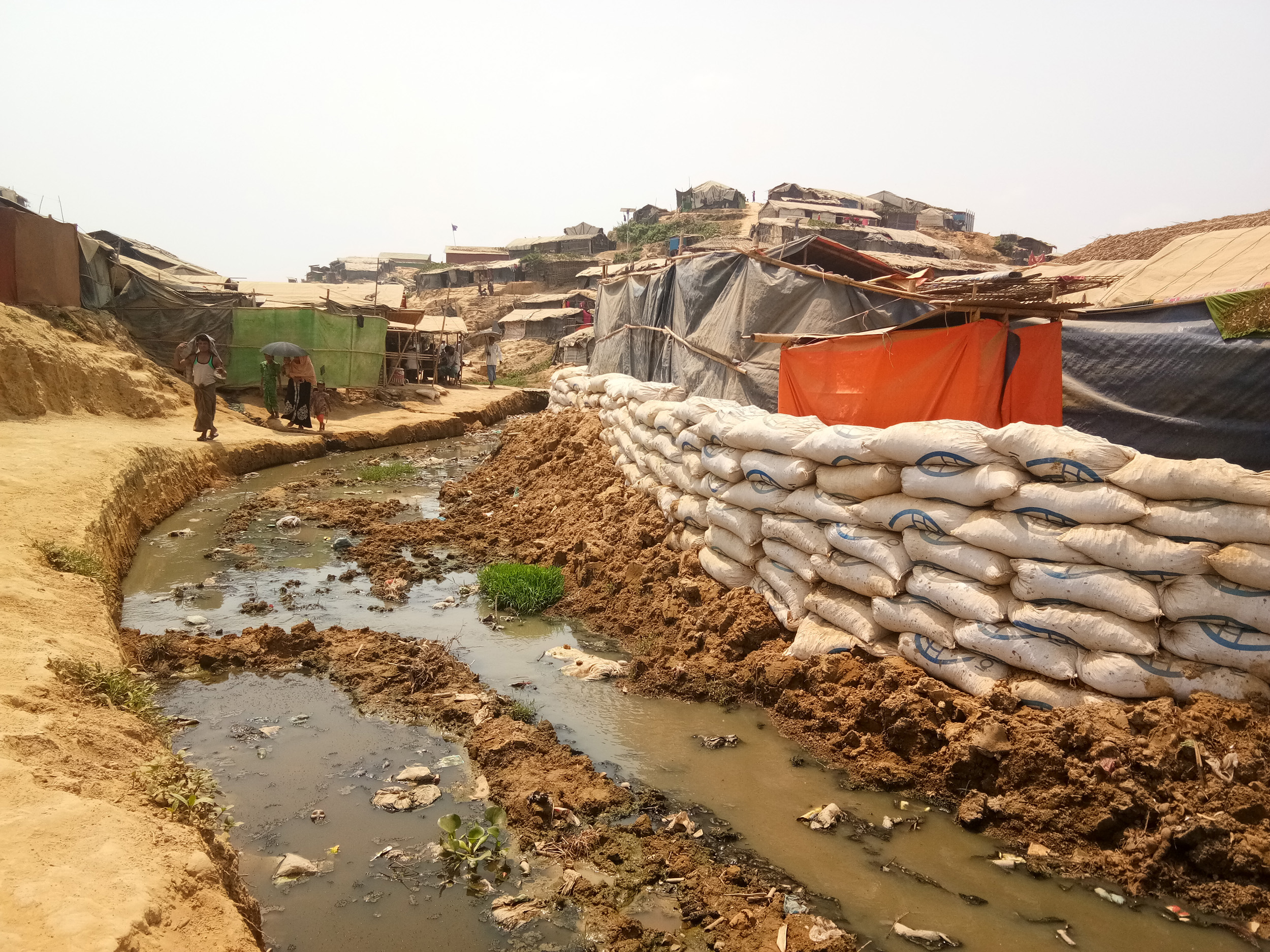
Sandbags placed with the help of aid agencies to prevent flooding at Balukhali refugee camp during the monsoon season.

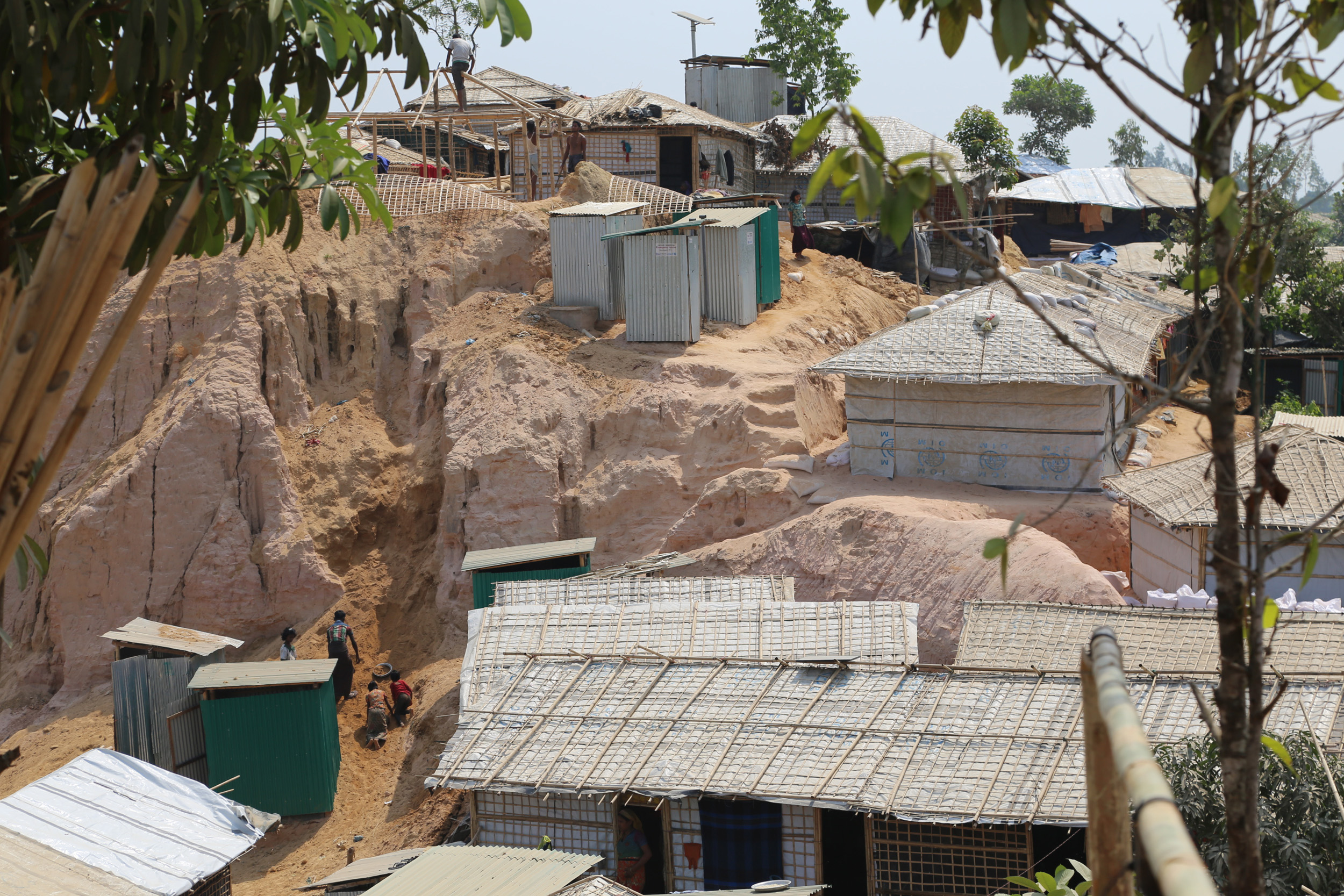
Makeshift shacks on a hill in Balukhali refugee camp, constructed by aid agencies for Rohingya refugees.
