= Sveinung Valle =

Norwegian farmer and politician

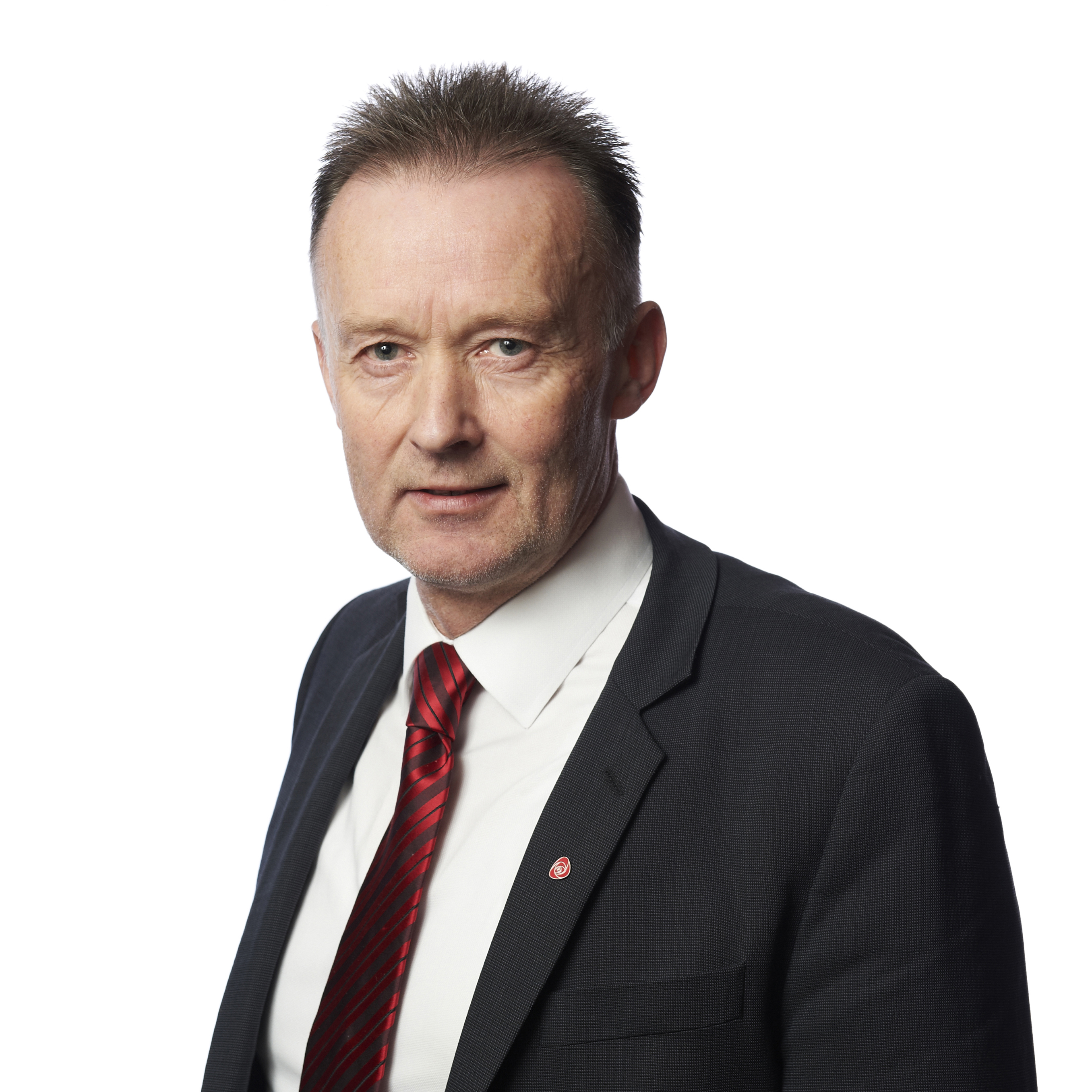

Sveinung Valle (1959 – 20 March 2016) was a Norwegian farmer and politician for the Labour Party.

He was a cattle farmer in Lindås Municipality, and joined the Labour Party in 1997. He was an elected member of the municipal council for Lindås Municipality and the Hordaland county council, chaired Hordaland Labour Party from 2009 to 2014 and Lindås Labour Party. He also chaired Hordaland Agrarian Association, and from 2000 to 2001 he served in Stoltenberg's First Cabinet as State Secretary in the Ministry of Agriculture.

Valle died suddenly in his home in March 2016.
