= Reidun Brusletten =

Norwegian politician (born 1936)

Minister of International Development
- In office 8 June 1983 – 9 May 1986
- Prime Minister: Kåre Willoch
- Preceded by: Office established
- Succeeded by: Vesla Vetlesen

Deputy Member of the Storting
- In office 1 October 1977 – 30 September 1981
- Constituency: Buskerud

Personal details
- Born: 29 November 1936 (age 89) Oslo, Norway
- Party: Christian Democratic

Reidun Brusletten (born 29 November 1936 in Oslo) is a Norwegian politician for the Christian Democratic Party. She served as the first Minister of International Development from 1983 to 1986. She was also a deputy member in the Storting for Buskerud from 1977 to 1981.
