= Henrik Thune =

Norwegian academic, writer and diplomat

Henrik Thune (born 1969) is a Norwegian academic, writer and diplomat, who is State Secretary/Deputy Foreign Minister of Norway. He is the former director of the Norwegian Center for Conflict Resolution (NOREF). He was previously a senior research fellow at the Norwegian Institute of International Affairs (NUPI) and head of its Middle East Programme.

Thune holds a PhD and two master's degrees in international relations from the University of Oslo and the London School of Economics and Political Science. He has served five years as a diplomat in the Norwegian Ministry of Foreign Affairs. From 2009 to 2012 he was a project manager at the Secretariat of the Norwegian Foreign Minister Jonas Gahr Støre.

Thune has published numerous books and articles on international relations theory, the Middle East, Norwegian foreign policy, and the role of the news media in international relations, and he is a commentator and columnist in Norwegian newspapers.
