= Helge Hansen (resistance fighter) =

Norwegian resistance fighter

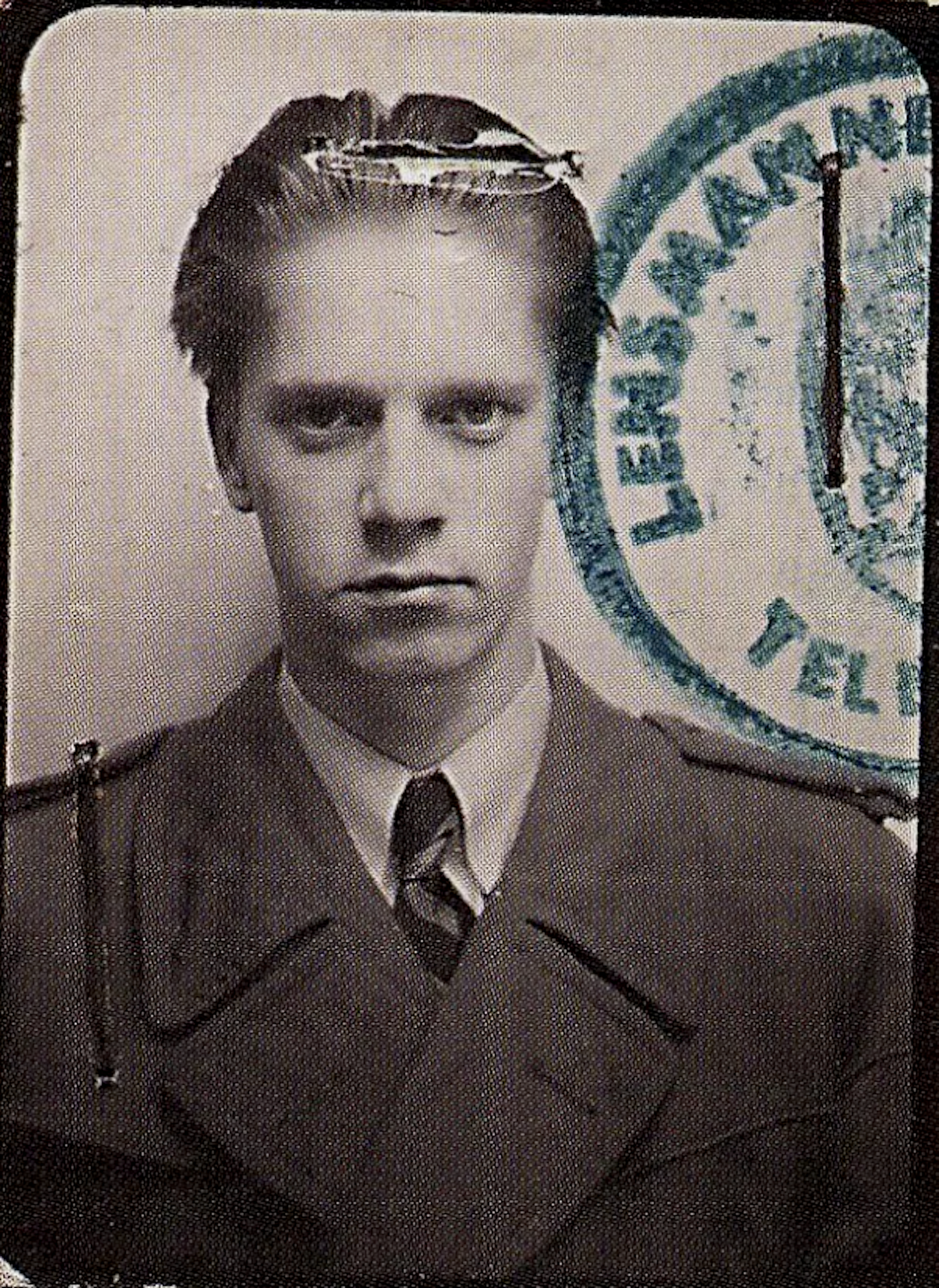
- Helge Hansen in 1943
- Born: 1923
- Died: 2003 (aged 79–80)
- Occupation: Resistance fighter
- Known for: Politician, chemist and factory manager

Helge Hansen (1923–2003) was a Norwegian resistance member during the German occupation of Norway, and later a politician, chemist and factory manager.

== Personal life ==
He was born in as the son of Peder Håkon Jarl Hansen (1890–1986) and Sigrid Berger (1898–1994). The family settled in Stavanger, and he was attending the Stavanger Cathedral School at the outbreak of World War II. His father, a member of the Norwegian Communist Party, was imprisoned and incarcerated at the Sachsenhausen concentration camp during the war. His brother Johan was sent to Nacht und Nebel camp Natzweiler. He was also the brother of later politician and government minister Vesla Vetlesen.

== Second World War ==
During World War II, while his family lived in Stavanger, Hansen became involved both in intelligence and in production of illegal newspapers. He was arrested by the Gestapo in November 1942, and imprisoned at the Lagårdsveien prison. He became famous for his escape from custody in December 1942, and managed to flee to Sweden. In Sweden he was trained in use of arms and in sabotage. He returned to Stavanger in September 1944, with the aim of establishing a sabotage group in the Stavanger district. 29 November 1944 the factory Hillevåg Knottfabrikk was burnt down by the group. Shortly after, the two and only assassinations in the Stavanger district were carried out, when the denouncer Herbert Geiche and Stapo torturist Leonard Wickstrøm were shot.

After being involved in a shooting incident 15 January 1945, where he was hit in the shoulder, he decided to try to flee to Sweden by crossing the mountains on ski. During this travel he came across Knut Haukelid's Milorg group. He joined Haukelid's group, and took part in Operation Sunshine, an anti-demolition operation intended to protect essential Norwegian industry against possible German sabotage operations towards the end of the war.

== Later career ==
After the war Hansen was engaged in politics. He was elected to the Stavanger City council, representing the Communist Party. He was later expelled from the Communist Party, and some years later joined the Labour Party. He completed his education as a chemist in Stockholm. From 1947 he worked at the soap factory Nordkronen in Stavanger, first as a chemist, and later as manager of the factory.
