= Vesla Vetlesen =

Norwegian weaver, trade unionist and politician (1930–2024)

Minister of International Development
- In office 9 May 1986 – 13 June 1988
- Prime Minister: Gro Harlem Brundtland
- Preceded by: Reidun Brusletten
- Succeeded by: Kirsti Kolle Grøndahl

Personal details
- Born: Gunvor Hansen; 19 October 1930 Farsund, Vest-Agder, Norway
- Died: 21 August 2024 (aged 93)
- Party: Labour
- Spouse: Leif Vetlesen (1951–2003, his death)

Gunvor "Vesla" Vetlesen (née Hansen, 19 October 1930 – 21 August 2024) was a Norwegian weaver, trade unionist, writer and politician for the Labour Party. She was Minister of International Development from 1986 to 1988.

== Biography ==
Vetlesen was born in Farsund as a daughter of Peder Håkon Jarl Hansen (1890–1986) and Sigrid Berger (1898–1994). The family moved to Stavanger in 1937. For a period during the German Occupation of Norway the family's home at Storhaug was the location for production of the illegal newspapers Stritt folk and Frihet. Her father was later imprisoned and sent to the Sachsenhausen concentration camp, while her brother Johan was sent to NN camps. Her brother Helge was the joint leader of a group of saboteurs in the Stavanger district during the war. She finished her secondary education in 1949 and studied textile design at the Norwegian National Academy of Craft and Art Industry from 1950 to 1954. In 1951 she became the second wife of Leif Vetlesen (1921–2003). She was a communist during her early life, chairing the regional chapter of the Young Communist League of Norway in Rogaland from 1948 to 1949, when she was expelled from the Communist Party. After the Soviet invasion of Hungary she renounced Communism and joined the Norwegian Labour Party together with her husband.

Vetlesen worked as a weaver from 1951, and left Norway to teach weaving in Uganda in 1968, where her husband worked for the Norwegian Agency for Development Cooperation. After some years in Uganda, they returned to Norway. Vesla Vetlesen was a journalist for the European Movement for one year before working in Arbeidernes Opplysningsforbund. She then worked as a secretary for humanitarian organizations; Save the Children from 1973 to 1975 and Norwegian People's Aid from 1975 to 1980, before working in the Norwegian Confederation of Trade Unions from 1980 to 1986 and 1988 to 1994. From 1986 to 1988 she served as Norway's Minister of Development Cooperation in Brundtland's Second Cabinet. Her only elected political position was as borough council member in Vestli from 1973 to 1977.

Vetlesen was a board member of the United Nations Association of Norway from 1982 to 1984, and chaired the European Movement in Oslo from 2000 to 2001. She wrote several books. She was also interested in flowers in her later life, chairing the Norwegian Orchid Society from 1989 to 1998.

Vetlesen died on 21 August 2024, at the age of 93.

Political offices
Preceded by Reidun Brusletten	Minister of Development Cooperation; 1986–1988	Succeeded by Kirsti Kolle Grøndahl
