= Solveig Solbakken =

Norwegian politician

Solveig Solbakken (born 25 June 1949) is a Norwegian politician for the Labour Party.

She served as a deputy representative to the Norwegian Parliament from Aust-Agder during the terms 1997–2001 and 2001–2005. Between 2000 and 2001, during the first cabinet Stoltenberg, she was appointed State Secretary in the Ministry of Children and Family Affairs.

On the local level, she has been deputy mayor of Lillesand Municipality.
