= Minister of International Development (Norway) =

Norwegian cabinet position

Minister of International Development of Norway
- Bistands- og utviklingsministeren

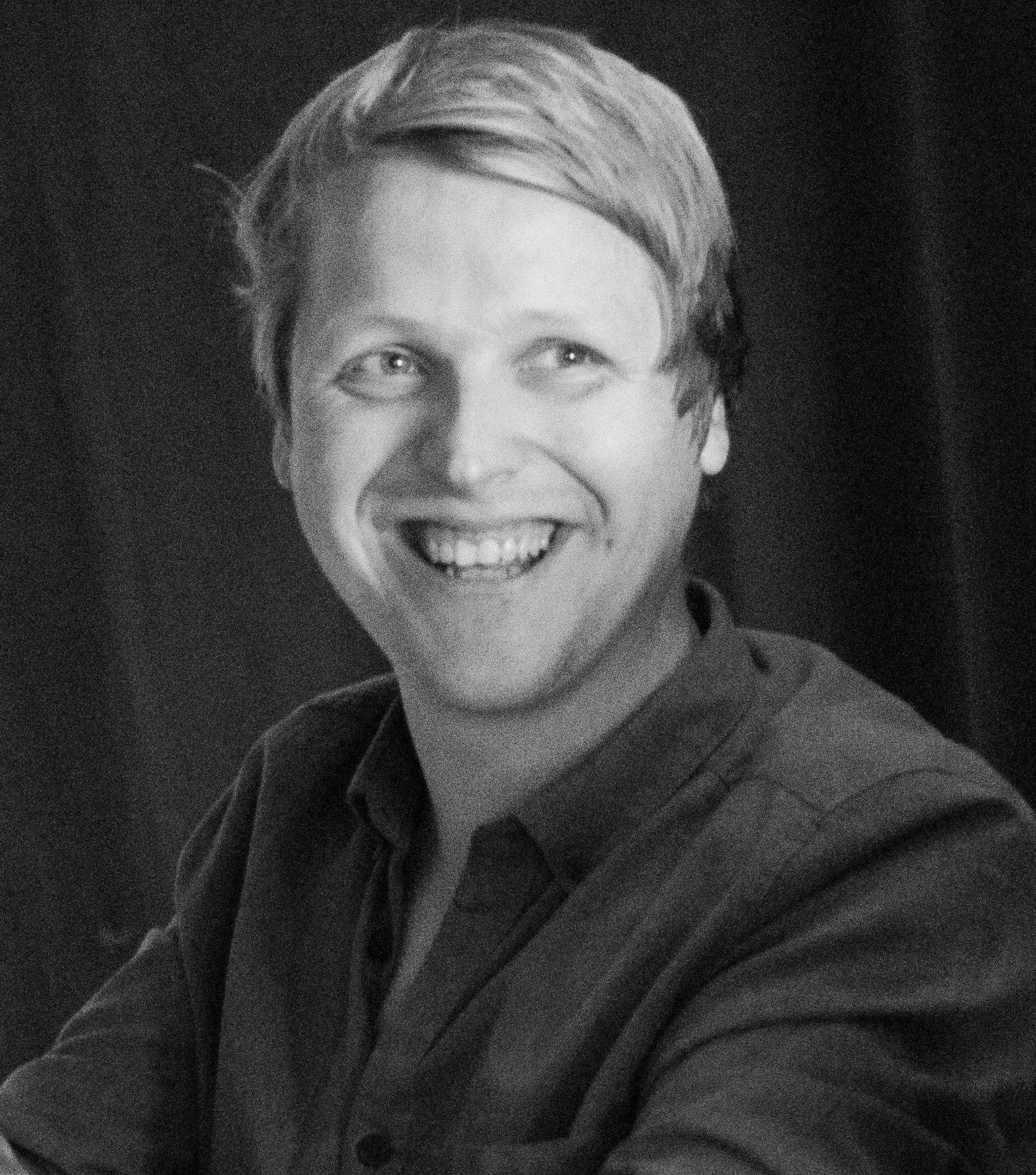
- Incumbent; Åsmund Grøver Aukrust since 4 February 2025
- Ministry of Foreign Affairs
- Member of: Council of State
- Seat: Victoria Terrasse, Oslo
- Nominator: Prime Minister
- Appointer: Monarch; with approval of Parliament
- Term length: No fixed length
- Constituting instrument: Constitution of Norway
- Precursor: Minister of Foreign Affairs
- Formation: 8 June 1983 (originally); 17 January 2018 (re-established)
- First holder: Reidun Brusletten
- Abolished: 16 October 2013
- Deputy: State secretaries at the Ministry of Foreign Affairs
- Website: Official website

The Minister of International Development (Norwegian: Bistands- og utviklingsministeren) is a councillor of state and the chief of the international development portfolio of the Ministry of Foreign Affairs of Norway. The ministry was responsible for the foreign service, the country's international interests and foreign policy. Most of the ministry's portfolio is subordinate to the Minister of Foreign Affairs. The prime operating agency for international development is the Norwegian Agency for Development Cooperation. The position has been held by ten people representing five parties.

The position was created with the appointment of Willoch's Second Cabinet on 8 June 1983, with Reidun Brusletten of the Christian Democratic Party appointed the first minister. From 1 January 1984 to 31 December 1989, the minister had their own ministry, the Ministry of Development Cooperation. Eleven people from four parties had held the position, with Hilde Frafjord Johnson of the Christian Democratic Party being the only to have held it twice. Erik Solheim of the Socialist Left Party has sat the longest, for six and a half years. Solheim also acted as Minister of the Environment from 18 October 2007 to his retirement. Heikki Holmås of the Socialist Left Party, who was appointed on 23 March 2012, became the last Minister of International Development when Stoltenberg's Second Cabinet resigned on 16 October 2013. In Solberg's Cabinet, issues related to international development were transferred to the Minister of Foreign Affairs. The position was re-established in 2018 after the Liberal Party joined the Solberg Cabinet.

== Key ==
The following lists the minister, their party, date of assuming and leaving office, their tenure in years and days, and the cabinet they served in.

Centre Party
Christian Democratic Party
Conservative Party
Labour Party
Socialist Left Party

== Ministers ==
| Photo | Name | Party | Took office | Left office | Tenure | Cabinet | Ref |
|---|---|---|---|---|---|---|---|
| — | Reidun Brusletten | Christian Democratic | 8 June 1983 | 9 May 1986 | 2 years, 335 days | Willoch II | |
| — | Vesla Vetlesen | Labour | 9 May 1986 | 13 June 1988 | 2 years, 35 days | Brundtland II | |
| — | Kirsti Kolle Grøndahl | Labour | 13 June 1988 | 16 October 1989 | 1 year, 125 days | Brundtland II | |
| — | Tom Vraalsen | Centre | 16 October 1989 | 3 November 1990 | 1 year, 18 days | Syse | |
| | Grete Faremo | Labour | 3 November 1990 | 4 September 1992 | 1 year, 306 days | Brundtland III | |
| — | Kari Nordheim-Larsen | Labour | 4 September 1992 | 17 October 1997 | 5 years, 43 days | Brundtland III; Jagland | |
| | Hilde Frafjord Johnson | Christian Democratic | 17 October 1997 | 17 March 2000 | 2 years, 152 days | Bondevik I | |
| | Anne Kristin Sydnes | Labour | 17 March 2000 | 19 October 2001 | 1 year, 216 days | Stoltenberg I | |
| | Hilde Frafjord Johnson | Christian Democratic | 19 October 2001 | 17 October 2005 | 3 years, 363 days | Bondevik II | |
| | Erik Solheim | Socialist Left | 17 October 2005 | 23 March 2012 | 6 years, 158 days | Stoltenberg II | |
| | Heikki Holmås | Socialist Left | 23 March 2012 | 16 October 2013 | 1 year, 207 days | Stoltenberg II | |
Abolished between 2013 and 2018
| | Nikolai Astrup | Conservative | 17 January 2018 | 22 January 2019 | 1 year, 5 days | Solberg | |
| | Dag Inge Ulstein | Christian Democratic | 22 January 2019 | 14 October 2021 | 2 years, 265 days | Solberg | |
| | Anne Beathe Tvinnereim | Centre | 14 October 2021 | 4 February 2025 | 3 years, 113 days | Støre | |
| | Åsmund Grøver Aukrust | Labour | 4 February 2025 | present | 1 year, 270 days | Støre | |
