= International development minister =

Government position

An International development minister is a position in many governments responsible for and development assistance (also known as development aid) and international development.

== Country-related articles and lists ==
- Australia: Minister for International Development
- Canada: Minister of International Development
- France: Minister of Foreign Affairs and International Development
- Ireland: Minister of State for Overseas development aid
- Netherlands: Minister for Foreign Trade and Development Cooperation
- Norway: Minister of International Development
- Sweden: Minister for International Development Cooperation
- United Kingdom: Formerly Secretary of State for International Development; now Secretary of State for Foreign, Commonwealth and Development Affairs and Minister of State for Development and Africa
  - Scotland: Minister for International Development and Europe
