= Jan-Erik Larsen =

Norwegian editor and politician

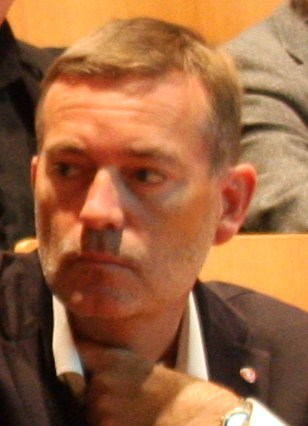
Jan-Erik Larsen

Jan-Erik Larsen (born 27 May 1963) is a Norwegian editor and former politician for the Labour Party, and former State Secretary in the Office of the Prime Minister.

== Career ==
He started his political career as chairman of the Møre og Romsdal county chapter of the Workers' Youth League in the early 1980s, and later served in the Møre og Romsdal county council from 1983 to 1987. During the first cabinet Stoltenberg 2000-2001 he was appointed State Secretary and responsible officer for press relations in the Office of the Prime Minister. When the government resigned after the election in 2001, Larsen was appointed special advisor to the Labour party group in the Norwegian Parliament, a position he left in 2003. In September 2008, he was re-appointed State Secretary in the Office of the Prime Minister in the second cabinet Stoltenberg.

Outside politics, Larsen worked as a journalist and editor for several regional newspapers. He was editor of Tidens Krav 1990-1993 and editor-in-chief of Telemarksavisa 1993–1998. He returned to Tidens Krav 2005-2008 as editor-in-chief. He has also held positions in the company A-pressen.
