= Fatma Jynge =

Norwegian architect and politician (1945–2019)

- Born: 29 November 1945; Tanzania
- Died: 16 July 2019 (aged 73); Hamar, Norway
- Other name: Fatma Karmali Bhanji Jynge
- Occupation: Architect
- Political party: Labour Party

Fatma Jynge (29 November 1945 – 16 July 2019) was a Norwegian architect and politician for the Labour Party.

Born in Tanzania and educated in Nairobi, Kenya, Jynge moved to Norway in 1971. She eventually assumed various administrative positions, in Hedmark County Municipality, in the Norwegian Defence Estates Agency, and in the Norwegian State Housing Bank. She was appointed State Secretary in the Ministry of Local Government in 2000, but served only for a short period.

Jynge died in Hamar on 16 July 2019.
