= Ministry of Foreign Affairs (Norway) =

Government ministry of Norway

Coordinates: 59°54′52.56″N 10°43′44.98″E

Royal Ministry of Foreign Affairs
- Det kongelige utenriksdepartementet Det kongelege utanriksdepartementet

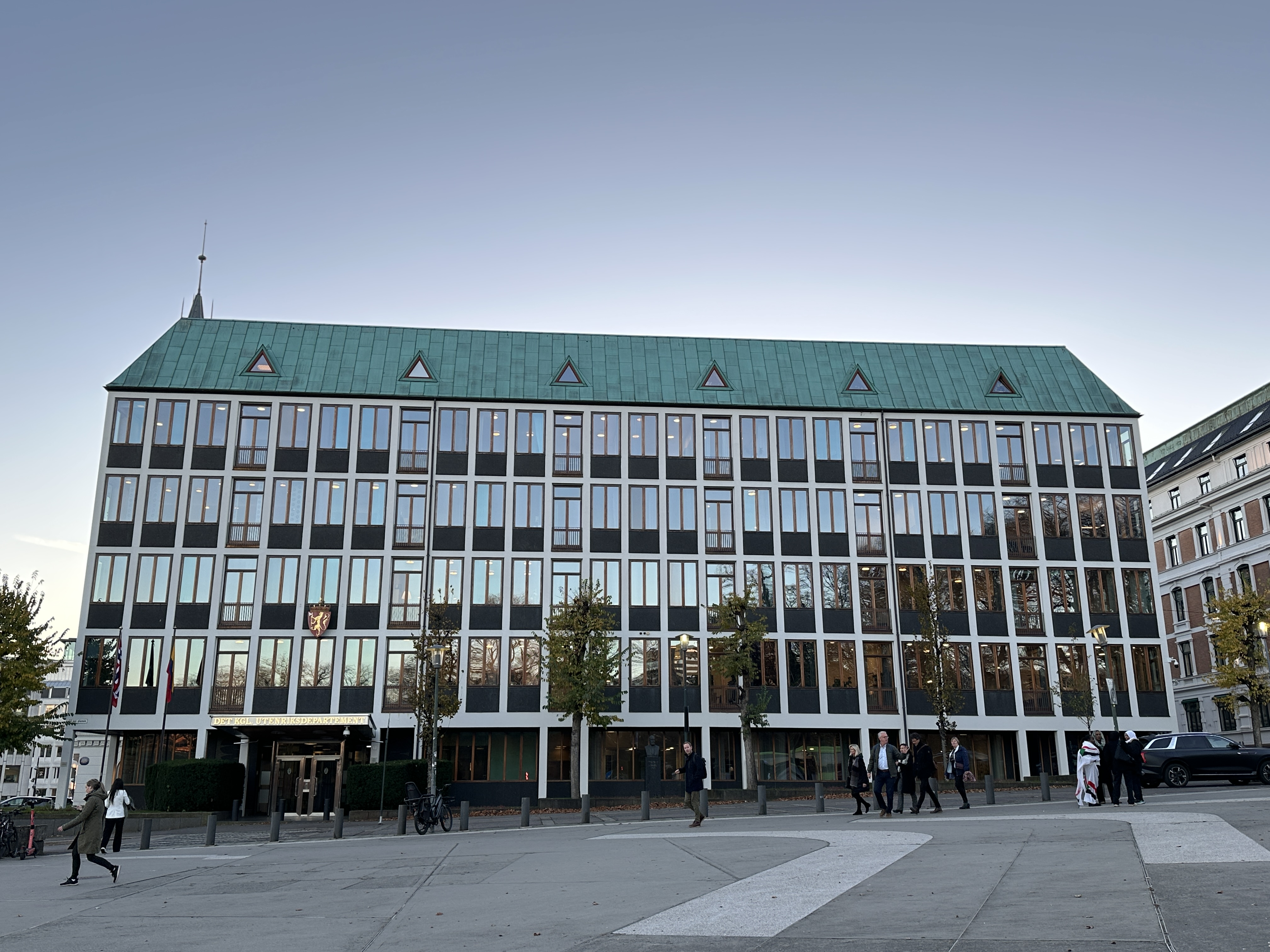

Agency overview
- Formed: 7 June 1905
- Jurisdiction: Government of Norway
- Headquarters: Victoria Terrasse, Oslo, Norway
- Annual budget: Nok.34 billion
- Ministers responsible: Espen Barth Eide, Minister of Foreign Affairs; Anne Beathe Tvinnereim, Minister of International Development
- Agency executive: Torgeir Larsen, Secretary General
- Child agencies: Norad; Norec; Norfund
- Website: Official website

Footnotes
- List of Norwegian ministries

The Royal Norwegian Ministry of Foreign Affairs (Norwegian Bokmål: Det kongelige utenriksdepartement or Utenriksdepartementet; Nynorsk: Det kongelege utanriksdepartementet or Utanriksdepartementet; UD) is the foreign ministry of the Kingdom of Norway. It was established on June 7, 1905, the same day the Parliament of Norway (Storting) decided to dissolve the personal union with Sweden.

The ministry is headed by the minister of foreign affairs, currently Espen Barth Eide, who is a minister in the Støre cabinet that has governed since 14 October 2021.

The ministry also holds a position of minister of international development. This position was established by the second Willoch cabinet in 1983, and existed until October 2013 when it was abolished by the Solberg cabinet and the foreign minister became the sole head of the ministry. The position was restored on January 17, 2018, when the Liberal party joined the Solberg government. The current minister of international development is Anne Beathe Tvinnereim from the Centre Party.

== History ==
The Ministry of Foreign Affairs was established on the same day that Norway declared the dissolution of the union with Sweden: June 7, 1905. Although diplomats could not present credentials to foreign governments until the Swedish king formally renounced his right to the Norwegian throne, a number of unofficial representatives worked on the provisional government's behalf until the first Norwegian ambassador, Hjalmar Christian Hauge, sought accreditation by the United States secretary of state, Elihu Root, on November 6, 1905.

The initial purposes of the newly formed Foreign Ministry were to represent Norway's interests through diplomatic channels, and to provide consular services for Norwegian shipping and commerce overseas. In 1906, the Storting decided to establish six embassies in Europe, with two more in the Americas: one in the United States and one in Argentina. 20 consular offices were also opened.

During World War I, the foreign ministry was confronted with unprecedented challenges in maintaining neutrality for Norway, in particular in order to protect its merchant fleet.

In 1922, the ministry was consolidated and reorganised to ensure fuller cooperation between the diplomatic and consular branches. The reorganization included the formation of a designated career path for diplomats that included completion of a university entrance examination and professional experience from international trade. The economic hardship of the times forced austerity measures at the ministry for the next several years.

When Norway was invaded by Nazi Germany in 1940, the government fled to the United Kingdom and reconstituted in exile in Bracknell, outside London. Kingston House in London was later used. The government moved back to Norway following the peace in 1945.

After the end of World War II, Norway was a founding member of the North Atlantic Treaty Organization and the United Nations, the latter having Norwegian Trygve Lie as inaugural secretary-general. Norway was also part of the first slate of non-permanent members to the United Nations Security Council.

== Organisation ==
The Norwegian Ministry of Foreign Affairs is organised with 110 foreign missions and three subordinate organisations: Norwegian Agency for Development Cooperation (Norad), Norwegian Agency for Exchange Cooperation (Norec) and the development country investment fund Norfund. The Ministry and foreign missions have a total staff of approx. 2,400. While this is significant for a country with a small population, there are still some parts of the world for which Norway has no embassies or consultates, including states in Central Asia.

=== Name ===
The formal name of the ministry is the Royal Ministry of Foreign Affairs (Bokmål: Det kongelige utenriksdepartement with the short form Utenriksdepartementet, and Nynorsk: Det kongelege utanriksdepartementet with the short form Utanriksdepartementet), abbreviated as UD. The ministry is also sometimes known as the Royal Norwegian Ministry of Foreign Affairs (Bokmål: Det kongelige norske utenriksdepartement or Nynorsk: Det kongelege norske utanriksdepartementet). In everyday speech in Norway it is usually known under its short form, with the longer forms reserved for formal letters and documents.

=== The political level ===
Minister of Foreign Affairs Anniken Huitfeldt
Minister of International Development Anne Beathe Tvinnereim

- State Secretaries for Foreign Affairs Henrik Thune, Eivind Vad Petersson (both Labour).
- State Secretary for International Development Bjørg Sandkjær (Centre Party)
- Political Advisor Eirin Kristin Kjær (Labour)
- Secretariat of the Minister of Foreign Affairs
- Secretariat of the Minister of International Development
- Foreign Service Control Unit
- Communication Unit
- Legal Adviser

=== The operational level ===
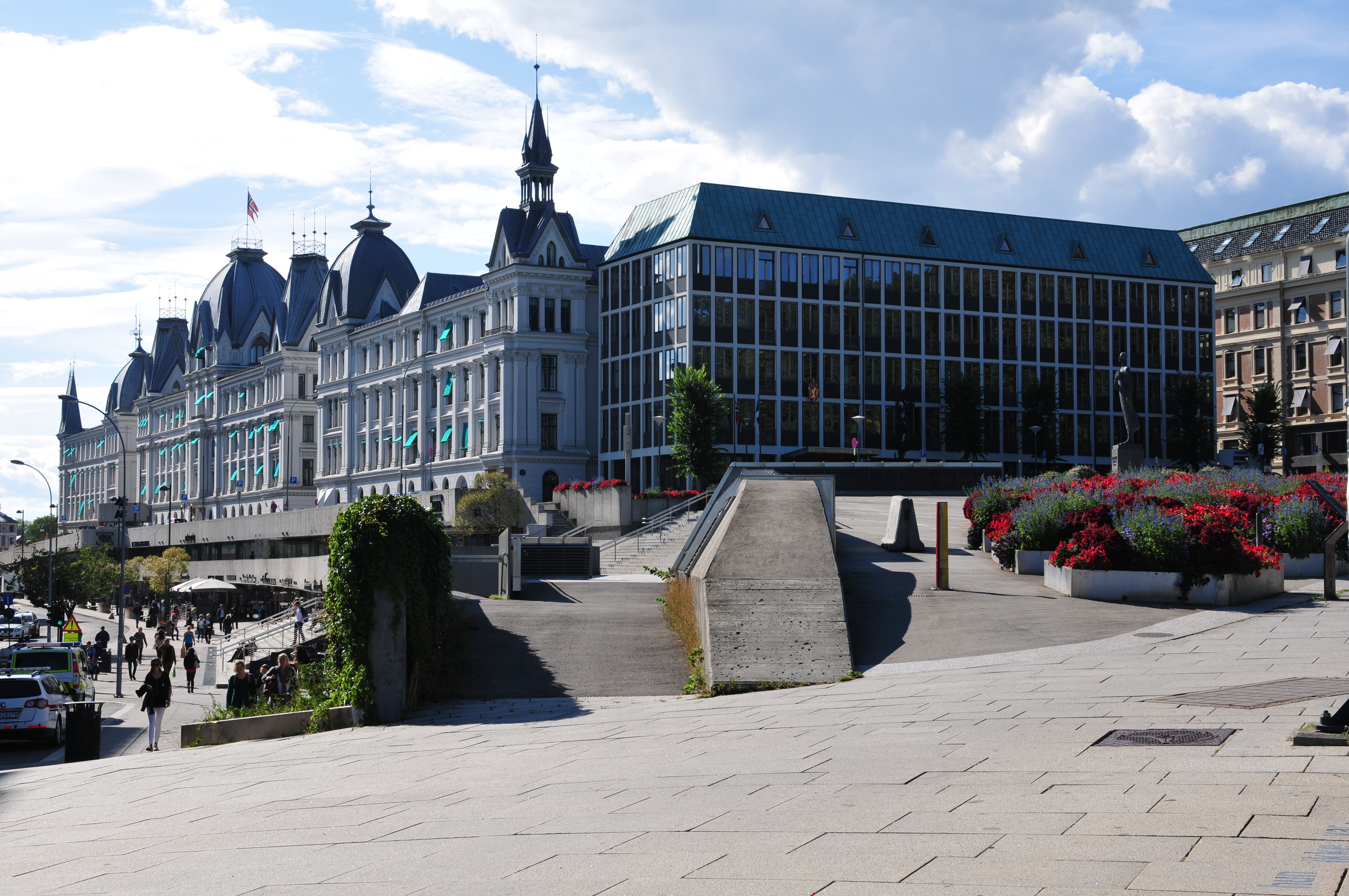
The ministry occupies the historic Victoria Terrasse building in Oslo

The top public servant is the secretary general (utenriksråd) with an assistant secretary general as substitute (the latter also with a special responsibility for international development issues).

The ministry currently has nine departments, each headed by a director general (known in Norwegian as ekspedisjonssjef)

- Department for European Affairs and International Trade
- Department for Security Policy and the High North
- Department for Regional Affairs
- Department for Multilateral Affairs
- Department for Sustainable Development
- Department for Culture, Business Relations and Protocol
- Legal Affairs Department
- Human and Financial Resources Department
- Services Department

=== Subsidiaries ===
- Norfund
- Norwegian Agency for Development Cooperation (Norad)
- Norec

== See also ==
- Foreign relations of Norway
- List of diplomatic missions in Norway
- List of diplomatic missions of Norway
