= Norwegian Agency for Development Cooperation =

Norwegian directorate

Norwegian Agency for Development Cooperation (Norad)
- Norad

Government agency overview
- Formed: December 1, 1968; 57 years ago
- Jurisdiction: Government of Norway
- Headquarters: Bygdøy allé 2, Oslo, Norway
- Employees: 224 (2013)
- Annual budget: 26.2 billion kroner
- Government agency executive: Bård Vegar Solhjell, Director
- Parent Government agency: Norwegian Ministry of Foreign Affairs
- Website: www.norad.no

The Norwegian Agency for Development Cooperation (Norad) is a directorate under the Norwegian Ministry of Foreign Affairs. It is primarily concerned with offering development aid to international partners, but in matters regarding Norway's International Climate and Forest Initiative (NICFI), Norad reports to the Norwegian Ministry of Climate and Environment.

Norad's functions are laid down in the agency's terms of references and annual letters of allocation issued by the Ministry of Foreign Affairs and the Ministry of Climate and Environment.

Norad works to ensure effective foreign aid, with quality assurance and evaluation. Norad finances NGOs and does its own research and projects. The current director general is Bård Vegar Solhjell. Norad used to be the official development assistance organization in Norway. As of mid-2004, the responsibility for state-to-state official development assistance has been transferred to the Norwegian Ministry of Foreign Affairs, while Norad continues to fund NGO activities in developing countries (particularly through its NORHED program), and contributes to the management of development funds while ensuring that Norwegian development cooperation is accurately evaluated and efficiently implemented.

== Organization ==
Norad consists of the following departments:

- Director General's Office
- Department for Climate, Energy, Environment and Research
- Department for Education and Global Health
- Department for Economic Development, Gender and Governance
- Civil Society Department
- Department for Quality Assurance
- Department for Communication
- Department of Human Resources and Administration
- Evaluation Department

== Finances ==
Norway granted NOK 36.6 billion in development assistance in 2016, corresponding to 1.11 per cent of Norway's gross national income (GNI).

According to the OECD, Norway’s total ODA (USD 5.2 billion, preliminary data) increased in 2022 due to aid to Ukraine and increased in-donor refugee costs, and represented 0.86% of GNI.

== Employees ==
- Director General, Bård Vegar Solhjell
- Director of Communications, Eva Bratholm
