= Christian August Thoring =

Norwegian politician

Christian August Thoring (1 October 1919 – 2003) was a Norwegian politician for the Labour Party. He was a failed candidate for the position as Rogaland's county mayor, and deputy county mayor, several times. He was also known as board chairman of Kommunal Landspensjonskasse and Rogalands Avis.

== Career ==
He was born in Stavanger, and graduated with the siv.øk. degree from the Norwegian School of Economics and Business Administration in 1946. He spent his professional career as financial executive in Lyse Kraftverk from 1947 to 1962, chief financial officer in Stavanger municipality from 1962 to 1966 and director of the company Forus Industritomteselskap from 1971 to 1992.

As a politician he is known as a member of Rogaland county council. He served from 1972 to 1988, leading his party group the entire time. Following the 1975 Norwegian local elections, Thoring was in a vote-off within the council against Christian Democratic politician Beint Bentsen to become county mayor. Thoring received 24 votes—corresponding to the 21 representatives of the Labour Party and the 3 representatives of the Socialist Left Party—whereas Bentsen received 47 votes. Thoring then stood as a candidate for deputy county mayor, but lost to Conservative politician Lars Vaage by the same margin. Following the 1979 Norwegian local elections, the vote was different. The bourgeois vote was split, resulting in 21 votes for Thoring, 34 for Vaage and 16 for Christian Democratic John S. Tveit. There was a second round, where the Labour Party pulled Thoring as a candidate, securing a 35–34 vote in favor of Tveit—with two abstentions. Vaage then beat Thoring in the vote for deputy county mayor. Following the 1983 Norwegian local elections, the vote was similar to that in 1975, with Thoring losing to Vaage in a 27–44 vote. Labour and Socialist Left had 21 and 3 representatives respectively; the last 3 votes in favor of Thoring has an unknown source; probably representatives from the Liberal Party.

In addition, Thoring was a member of Stavanger city council for two terms. He was a board member of Lyse Kraftverk and Sira-Kvina Kraftselskap from 1972 to 1988, and Det Stavangerske Dampskibsselskap for many years. He was a board member of Kommunal Landspensjonskasse from 1953 to 1979, and chairman from 1972 to 1978, as well as board chairman of the newspaper Rogalands Avis for many years.

He lived in Stavanger in his later life, and died in 2003.
