= Ministry of Local Government and Regional Development =

Government ministry of Norway

Royal Ministry of Local Government and Regional Development
- Det kongelige kommunal- og distriktsdepartementet

Agency overview
- Formed: 20 December 1948; 77 years ago
- Jurisdiction: Government of Norway
- Headquarters: Oslo, Norway
- Minister responsible: Sigbjørn Gjelsvik, Minister of Local Government and Regional Development
- Agency executive: Petter Skarheim, Secretary General
- Website: Official website

Footnotes
- List of Norwegian ministries

The Royal Norwegian Ministry of Local Government and Regional Development (Norwegian: Kommunal- og distriktsdepartementet, KDD) is a Norwegian ministry established in 1948. It is responsible for housing and building, regional and rural policy, municipal and county administration and finances, and the conduct of elections. It is headed by the Minister of Local Government and Regional Development.

During the Solberg government, the ministry was called the Ministry of Local Government and Modernisation. This was created by merging the ongoing ministry with the Ministry of Government Administration, Reform and Church Affairs and the planning department in the Ministry of the Environment. The ministry adopted its current name on 1 January 2022.

== Name history ==
The ministry has changed its nomenclature frequently since 1948. Some of it indicateds the portfolio of the Ministry of Labour, which has since separated.

- 20 December 1948–31 December 1989: Ministry of Local Government and Labour
- 1 January 1990–31 December 1992: Ministry of Local Government
- 1 January 1993–31 December 1997: Ministry of Local Government and Labour
- 1 January 1998–31 December 2013: Ministry of Local Government and Regional Development
- 1 January 2014–31 December 2021: Ministry of Local Government and Modernisation
- 1 January 2022–: Ministry of Local Government and Regional Development

== Organisation ==
The ministry has 190 employees and is divided into five departments:

- The Department of Local Government
- The Department of Regional Development
- The Department of Housing and Building

=== Political staff ===
As of 30 June 2023, the political staff of the ministry is as follows:

- Minister Sigbjørn Gjelsvik (Centre Party)
- State Secretary Nancy Charlotte Porsanger Anti (Centre Party)
- State Secretary Gunn Karin Gjul (Labour Party)
- State Secretary Ole Gustav Narud (Centre Party)
- State Secretary Sigrun Wiggen Prestbakmo (Centre Party)
- Political Adviser Ingrid Nikoline Sand (Centre Party)

=== Subsidiaries ===
- Norwegian Mapping Authority, or Kartverket, dealing with land surveying.
- Norwegian State Housing Bank, or Husbanken, issues loans for housing.
- National Office of Building Technology and Administration, or Statens bygningstekniske etat, expertise within building technology.

== Ministers ==
- Ulrik Olsen, 1948–1958
- Andreas Zeier Cappelen, 1958–1963
- Oskar Skogly, 1963
- Bjarne Lyngstad, 1963
- Jens Haugland, 1963–1965
- Helge Seip, 1965–1970
- Helge Rognlien, 1970-1971
- Odvar Nordli, 1971–1972
- Johan Skipnes, 1972–1973
- Leif Jørgen Aune, 1973–1978
- Arne Nilsen, 1978–1979
- Inger Louise Valle, 1979–1980
- Harriet Andreassen, 1980–1981
- Arne Rettedal, 1981–1986
- Leif Haraldseth, 1986–1987
- William Engseth, 1987–1988
- Kjell Borgen, 1988–1989
- Johan J. Jakobsen, 1989–1990
- Kjell Borgen, 1990–1992
- Gunnar Berge, 1992–1996
- Kjell Opseth, 1996–1997
- Ragnhild Haarstad, 1997–1999
- Odd Roger Enoksen, 1999–2000
- Sylvia Brustad, 2000–2001
- Erna Solberg, 2001–2005
- Åslaug Haga, 2005–2007
- Magnhild Meltveit Kleppa, 2007–2009
- Liv Signe Navarsete, 2009–2013
- Jan Tore Sanner, 2013–2018
- Monica Mæland, 2018–2020
- Nikolai Astrup, 2020–2021
- Bjørn Arild Gram, 2021–2022
- Sigbjørn Gjelsvik, 2022–
