= Arne Rettedal =

Norwegian businessman and politician (1926–2001)

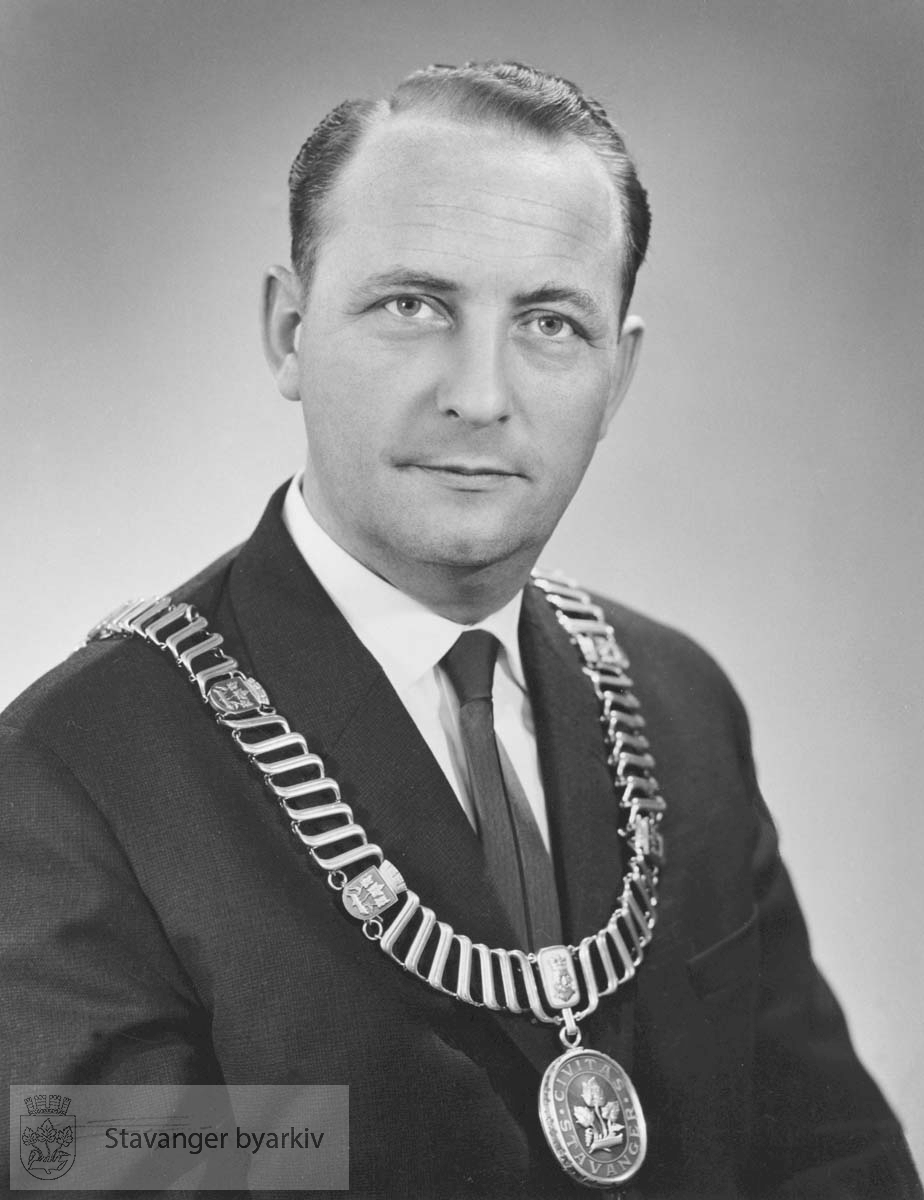

County Mayor of Rogaland
- In office 1 January 1988 – 31 December 1991
- Preceded by: Lars Vaage
- Succeeded by: Odd Arild Kvaløy

Minister of Local Government
- In office 14 October 1981 – 9 May 1986
- Prime Minister: Kåre Willoch
- Preceded by: Harriet Andreassen
- Succeeded by: Leif Haraldseth

Mayor of Stavanger
- In office 1 January 1972 – 14 October 1981
- Preceded by: Leif Larsen
- Succeeded by: Kari Thu
- In office 1 January 1965 – 31 December 1967
- Preceded by: Jan Johnsen
- Succeeded by: Leif Larsen

Personal details
- Born: 25 July 1926 Håland Municipality, Rogaland, Norway
- Died: 28 December 2001 (aged 75) Stavanger, Rogaland, Norway
- Party: Conservative
- Spouse: Agnes Windsand
- Children: Anne Rettedal Ekeli

Arne Rettedal (25 July 1926 – 28 December 2001) was a Norwegian engineer, businessperson and politician for the Conservative Party. He is best known as the Minister of Local Government and Labour from 1981 to 1986, mayor of Stavanger from 1965 to 1967 and 1972 to 1981 and county mayor of Rogaland from 1988 to 1991.

He was born in Madla (in what was Håland Municipality at that time) as a son of farmer Ola Rettedal (1882–1956) and Rakel Kristine Berge (1884–1963). He finished his secondary education in 1947, and enrolled at the Norwegian Institute of Technology where he graduated in engineering in 1957. He worked four years as an engineer before he started his own consulting company. Within local politics, he was a member of the municipal council of Madla Municipality from 1960 to 1964, serving as mayor in the last year. From 1965 to 1981 he was a member of the municipal council of Stavanger Municipality, serving as mayor from 1965 to 1967 and 1972 to 1981. He was also a member of Rogaland county council from 1967 to 1981, serving as deputy county mayor from 1967 to 1971. As a politician in Stavanger and Rogaland, he is co-credited with bringing the headquarters of Statoil and the Norwegian Petroleum Directorate to Stavanger. He was a member of Statoil's corporate council from 1975.

From 1981 to 1986 he served as Minister of Local Government and Labour in the First and Second Cabinet of Kåre Willoch. In this position, he is especially known for carrying through the government's housing policy. He is also known for the numerous labour conflicts in the petroleum industry during his period. Also, from 1990 to 1995 Rettedal was the board chairman of the Norwegian State Railways, where he again went through labour-related conflicts, this time with the Norwegian Union of Railway Workers leader Leif Thue. He also had rows with deputy director Tore Lindholt.

From 1988 to 1991 he served as County mayor of Rogaland. He tried to become county mayor after the 1991 election too, but lost out to Odd Arild Kvaløy. Kvaløy received 37 votes in the county council, whereas Rettedal received 28 votes and Kari Oftedal Lima received 6. The 28 votes were cast as blank votes in the vote for deputy county mayor; Kjell Erfjord received support from the 37 and Lima from the 6. Rettedal stood for mayoral election in 1995, but his candidacy was not voted upon in the county council.

In 1993 he was decorated as a Knight, First Class of the Royal Norwegian Order of St. Olav. Festschrifts were issued both on Rettedal's fiftieth and sixtieth birthdays, and he was biographed in 1998, in Thorbjørn Kindingstad's book Maktens byggherre. Historien om politikeren, ingeniøren og småbrukeren Arne Rettedal. He was married since 1954, and died on 28 December 2001 in Stavanger.

He was portrayed by actor Vegar Hoel in the Norwegian series Lykkeland.

Political offices
Preceded by Jan Johnsen	Mayor of Stavanger Municipality; 1965–1967	Succeeded by Leif Larsen
Preceded by Leif Larsen	Mayor of Stavanger Municipality; 1972–1981	Succeeded by Kari Thu
Preceded by Harriet Andreassen	Norwegian Minister of Local Government and Labour; 1981–1986	Succeeded by Leif Haraldseth
Civic offices
Preceded by Lars Vaage	County mayor of Rogaland; 1988–1991	Succeeded by Odd Arild Kvaløy
Preceded by Liv Torjusen	Chair of the Norwegian State Railways; 1990–1995	Succeeded by Jan Reinås
