= Lars Vaage =

Norwegian politician (1928–2006)

Lars Asbjørn Vaage (16 January 1928 – 6 January 2006) was a Norwegian physician and politician for the Conservative Party.

He was born in Brunlanes Municipality, and graduated with the cand.med. degree in 1953. He worked at a hospital from 1953 to 1962, and became a specialist in radiology in 1963. From 1962 to his retirement in 1992 he worked as a physician in Stavanger. He was also the medical leader at the Royal Norwegian Navy Basic Training Establishment at Madla from 1959 to 1988.

He was a member of the municipal council of Stavanger Municipality from 1965 to 1999—from 1968 to 1983 in the executive committee. He was also a member of Rogaland county council from 1972 to 1987. He served as deputy county mayor from 1979 to 1983 and county mayor from 1984 to 1987. In his rise to the county mayor position following the 1983 Norwegian local elections, the opposition's candidate for county mayor, Chr. Aug. Thoring of the Labour Party, received 27 votes in the county council, whereas Bentsen received 44. Eight years earlier, the vote had been almost identical; 47–24 between Beint Bentsen and Thoring. Four years earlier, the bourgeois vote had been split, resulting in 21 votes for Thoring, 34 for Vaage and 16 for John S. Tveit. In the second round, Labour pulled Thoring as a candidate, and secured a 35–34 vote in favor of Tveit—with two abstentions. Vaage beat Thoring in the vote for deputy county mayor, though.

Vaage chaired the local Conservative Party chapter in Stavanger from 1969 to 1971, and the regional party chapter from 1973 to 1977. In the latter period he was also a member of the party's central committee. He was an honorary member of both the local and regional party chapters.

Vaage was also board chairman of Stavanger Central Hospital from 1976 to 1983, Rogaland Teater from 1976 to 1987 and Norsk Havbruksforum 1988 to 1995, as well as a board member of Rogalandsforskning and Rogalandsdata. He was a supervisory board member of Rogalandsbanken and Fokus Bank, and was also involved in Norsk Luftambulanse. He was awarded the HM The King's Medal of Merit in 1998, and died in 2006. The street Lars Vaages gate in Stavanger was named after him in late 2006.

Political offices
Preceded by John S. Tveit	County mayor of Rogaland; 1984–1987	Succeeded by Arne Rettedal
