= Kjeld Rimberg =

Norwegian businessperson (1943–2024)

Kjeld Rimberg (25 November 1943 – 27 September 2024) was a Norwegian businessperson.

== Background ==
Rimberg was born in Bergen on 25 November 1943, a son of Sverre Johan Rimberg and Eli Lien. He married architect Reidun Tvedt in 1965. Rimberg died on 27 September 2024, at the age of 80.

== Early career ==
Rimberg was from Nordnes in Bergen and was an avid skier and ski-instructor in his youth. He worked as instructor in Switzerland for some time, combined with studies in Zurich. He took his education in construction engineering at ETH Zürich before graduating from the Norwegian Institute of Technology in 1969. He was active in the Student Society in Trondheim, and worked as a research assistant at the Norwegian Institute of Technology as well as a researcher for NTNF for five years.

In 1982 he became the CEO of Asplan. From September to 31 December he worked as CEO of Byggforsk to get that organization on its feet. In 1986 he was named as board member of Kongsberg Våpenfabrikk. He was also a board member of Norconsult, and was in 1987 named as chair of Vinmonopolet, where he stayed until 1995. Shortly thereafter the company KV Forsvar was split from Kongsberg Våpenfabrikk, and Rimberg became chair there as well. He was a deputy board member of Statoil.

== Norwegian State Railways ==
In 1988 Rimberg applied for the director-general position in the Norwegian State Railways. Robert Nordén had left, and Tore Lindholt was acting director-general. He was hired in September. He had to overcome opposition from Leif Thue and the Norwegian Union of Railway Workers, then the wage question had to be sorted out. The name of the position was changed from director-general to chief executive officer. In February 1990, after thirteen months in the job, he resigned, citing lack of freedom from political regulations as the reason. Leif Thue and the Union of Railway Workers stated that they did "not lament" his resignation.

== Consulting career ==
In 1989 Rimberg had become chairman of the Norwegian Polytechnic Society. He remained so until 1991. In 1990 he became a board member of Den Norske Hypotekforening and Rogalandsforskning, and chairman of Norsk Nyetablering. He was also chair of Chr. Grøner and Terramar, and deputy chair of Byggholt. After resigning Rimberg started his own consulting firm. In 1990 he was a project adviser in Statkraft, He was also an adviser for the Norwegian School of Management. He also hired other consultants to work in the company, including Siri Hatlen.

Rimberg chaired Nationaltheatret from 1992 to 2001. He was chairman of Forskningsparken, Anthon B Nilsen, STEP, and Berstad Wallendahl, a board member of Aschehoug, Norge 2005, and Aker. He was also an owner in Aker. In 2006 he had 10,300 stocks in the company, through his own company Kjeld Rimberg & Co.

He was a fellow of the Norwegian Academy of Technological Sciences.

Preceded by	Chairman of Vinmonopolet; 1987–1995	Succeeded by Harald Arnkværn
Preceded by Tore Lindholt (acting)	CEO of the Norwegian State Railways; 1989–1990	Succeeded by Tore Lindholt (acting)
Preceded by Eivald Røren	Chairman of the Norwegian Polytechnic Society; 1989–1991	Succeeded by Egil Bakke
Preceded by Thorbjørn Ustaheim	Chairman of Nationaltheatret; 1992–2001	Succeeded by Jan Vincents Johannessen
