= Minister of Local Government and Regional Development =

Norwegian cabinet position

Minister of Local Government and Regional Development of Norway
- Kommunal- og distriktsministeren

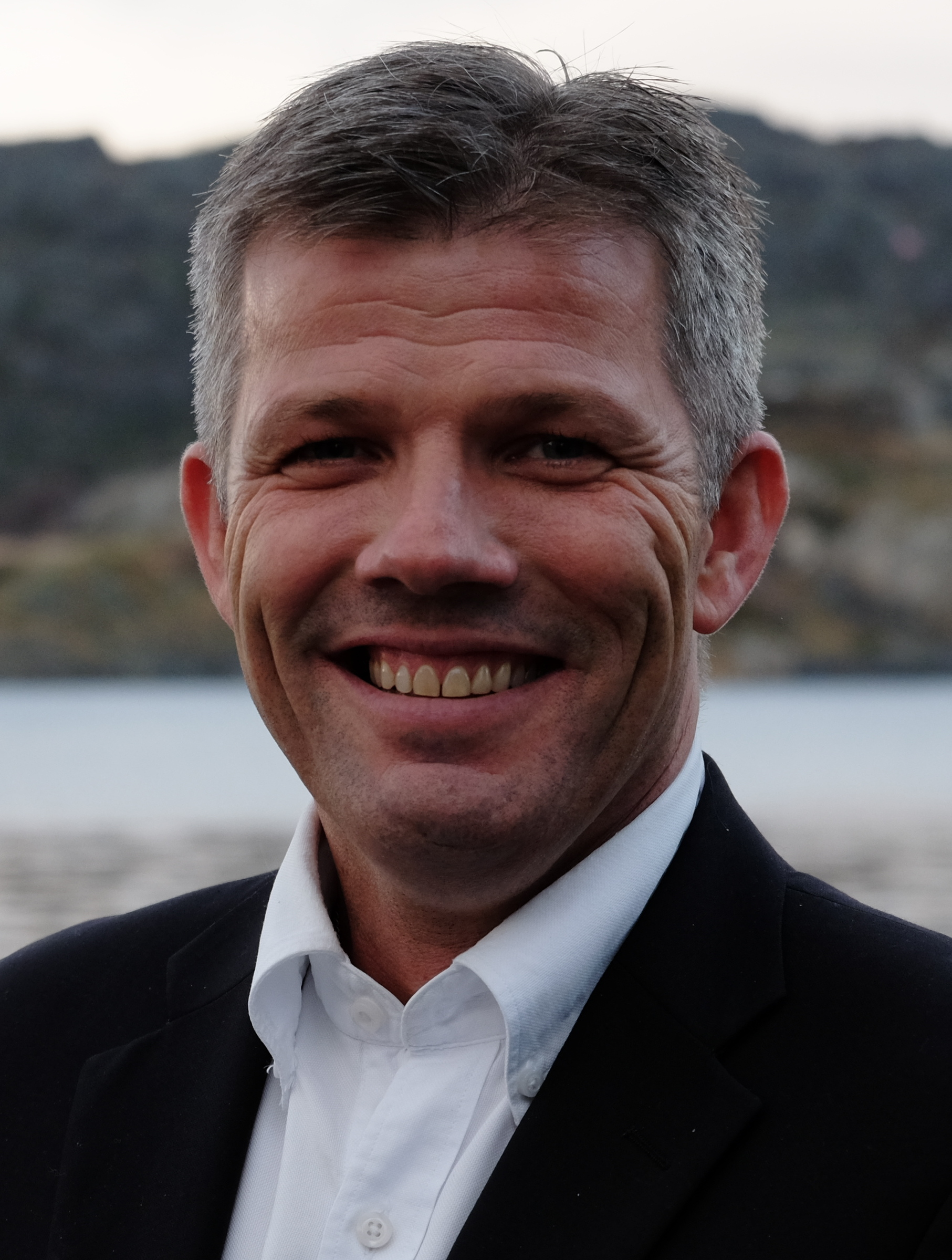
- Incumbent; Bjørnar Skjæran since 16 September 2025
- Ministry of Local Government and Regional Development
- Member of: Council of State
- Seat: Oslo
- Nominator: Prime Minister
- Appointer: Monarch; with approval of Parliament
- Term length: No fixed length
- Constituting instrument: Constitution of Norway
- Formation: 20 December 1948
- First holder: Ulrik Olsen
- Deputy: State secretaries at the Ministry of Local Government and Regional Development
- Website: Official website

The Minister of Local Government and Modernisation (Norwegian: Kommunal- og moderniseringsministeren) is a Councillor of State and Chief of the Norwegian Ministry of Local Government and Regional Development. Currently, Bjørnar Skjæran of the Labour Party has held the post since September 2025. The ministry is responsible for local administration, including municipalities and county municipalities, rural and regional policy, information technology, elections and government administration, including management of state real estate and government employment. Major subordinate agencies include the Government Administration Services, Statsbygg, the Competition Authority, the National Office of Building Technology and Administration, the State Housing Bank and the Data Protection Authority.

The position was created in 1948 as a successor of the Minister of Labour, originally named the Minister of Local Government and Labour. The title changed to the Minister of Local Government. Labour issues were moved to the Minister of Government Administration and Labour in 1998 and the title was changed to the Minister of Local Government and Regional Development until 2013. During the government of Erna Solberg, the post was renamed into Minister of Local Government and Modernisation when the position took over part of the portfolio of the Minister of Public Administration from 2014 until 2021. In January 2022, the current name was reverted into the 1998 one.

== Key ==
The following lists the minister, their party, date of assuming and leaving office, their tenure in years and days, and the cabinet they served in.

Centre Party
Conservative Party
Christian Democratic Party
Labour Party
Liberal Party

== Ministers ==
| Photo | Name | Party | Took office | Left office | Tenure | Cabinet | Ref |
|---|---|---|---|---|---|---|---|
| | Ulrik Olsen | Labour | 20 December 1948 | 1 September 1958 | 9 years, 255 days | Gerhardsen II; Torp; Gerhardsen III | |
| | Andreas Zeier Cappelen | Labour | 1 September 1958 | 4 February 1963 | 4 years, 156 days | Gerhardsen III | |
| | Oskar Skogly | Labour | 4 February 1963 | 28 August 1963 | 205 days | Gerhardsen III | |
| | Bjarne Lyngstad | Liberal | 28 August 1963 | 25 September 1963 | 28 days | Lyng | |
| | Jens Haugland | Labour | 25 September 1963 | 12 October 1965 | 2 years, 17 days | Gerhardsen IV | |
| | Helge Seip | Liberal | 12 October 1965 | 29 August 1970 | 4 years, 322 days | Borten | |
| | Helge Rognlien | Liberal | 29 August 1970 | 17 March 1971 | 200 days | Borten | |
| | Odvar Nordli | Labour | 17 March 1971 | 18 October 1972 | 1 year, 215 days | Bratteli I | |
| | Johan Skipnes | Christian Democratic | 18 October 1972 | 16 October 1973 | 363 days | Korvald | |
| | Leif Jørgen Aune | Labour | 16 October 1973 | 11 January 1978 | 4 years, 88 days | Bratteli II; Nordli | |
| | Arne Nilsen | Labour | 11 January 1978 | 8 October 1979 | 1 year, 271 days | Nordli | |
| | Inger Louise Valle | Labour | 8 October 1979 | 3 October 1980 | 361 days | Nordli | |
| | Harriet Andreassen | Labour | 3 October 1980 | 14 October 1981 | 1 year, 11 days | Nordli; Brundtland I | |
| | Arne Rettedal | Conservative | 14 October 1981 | 9 May 1986 | 4 years, 207 days | Willoch I–II | |
| | Leif Haraldseth | Labour | 9 May 1986 | 20 February 1987 | 287 days | Brundtland II | |
| | William Engseth | Labour | 20 February 1987 | 13 June 1988 | 1 year, 114 days | Brundtland II | |
| | Kjell Borgen | Labour | 13 June 1988 | 16 October 1989 | 1 year, 126 days | Brundtland II | |
| | Johan J. Jakobsen | Centre | 16 October 1989 | 3 November 1990 | 1 year, 19 days | Syse | |
| | Kjell Borgen | Labour | 3 November 1990 | 4 September 1992 | 1 year, 306 days | Brundtland III | |
| | Gunnar Berge | Labour | 4 September 1992 | 25 October 1996 | 4 years, 51 days | Brundtland III | |
| | Kjell Opseth | Labour | 25 October 1996 | 17 October 1997 | 357 days | Jagland | |
| | Ragnhild Queseth Haarstad | Centre | 17 October 1997 | 16 March 1999 | 1 year, 150 days | Bondevik I | |
| | Odd Roger Enoksen | Centre | 16 March 1999 | 17 March 2000 | 1 year, 1 day | Bondevik I | |
| | Sylvia Brustad | Labour | 17 March 2000 | 19 October 2001 | 1 year, 216 days | Stoltenberg I | |
| | Erna Solberg | Conservative | 19 October 2001 | 17 October 2005 | 3 years, 364 days | Bondevik II | |
| | Åslaug Haga | Centre | 17 October 2005 | 21 September 2007 | 1 year, 339 days | Stoltenberg II | |
| | Magnhild Meltveit Kleppa | Centre | 21 September 2007 | 20 October 2009 | 2 years, 29 days | Stoltenberg II | |
| | Liv Signe Navarsete | Centre | 20 October 2009 | 16 October 2013 | 3 years, 361 days | Stoltenberg II | |
| | Jan Tore Sanner | Conservative | 16 October 2013 | 17 January 2018 | 4 years, 93 days | Solberg | |
| | Monica Mæland | Conservative | 17 January 2018 | 24 January 2020 | 2 years, 7 days | Solberg | |
| | Nikolai Astrup | Conservative | 24 January 2020 | 14 October 2021 | 1 year, 263 days | Solberg | |
| | Bjørn Arild Gram | Centre | 14 October 2021 | 12 April 2022 | 180 days | Støre | |
| | Sigbjørn Gjelsvik | Centre | 12 April 2022 | 16 October 2023 | 1 year, 187 days | Støre | |
| | Erling Sande | Centre | 16 October 2023 | 4 February 2025 | 1 year, 111 days | Støre | |
| | Kjersti Stenseng | Labour | 4 February 2025 | 16 September 2025 | 224 days | Støre | |
| | Bjørnar Skjæran | Labour | 16 September 2025 | present | 1 year, 34 days | Støre | |
