= Odd Arild Kvaløy =

Norwegian politician

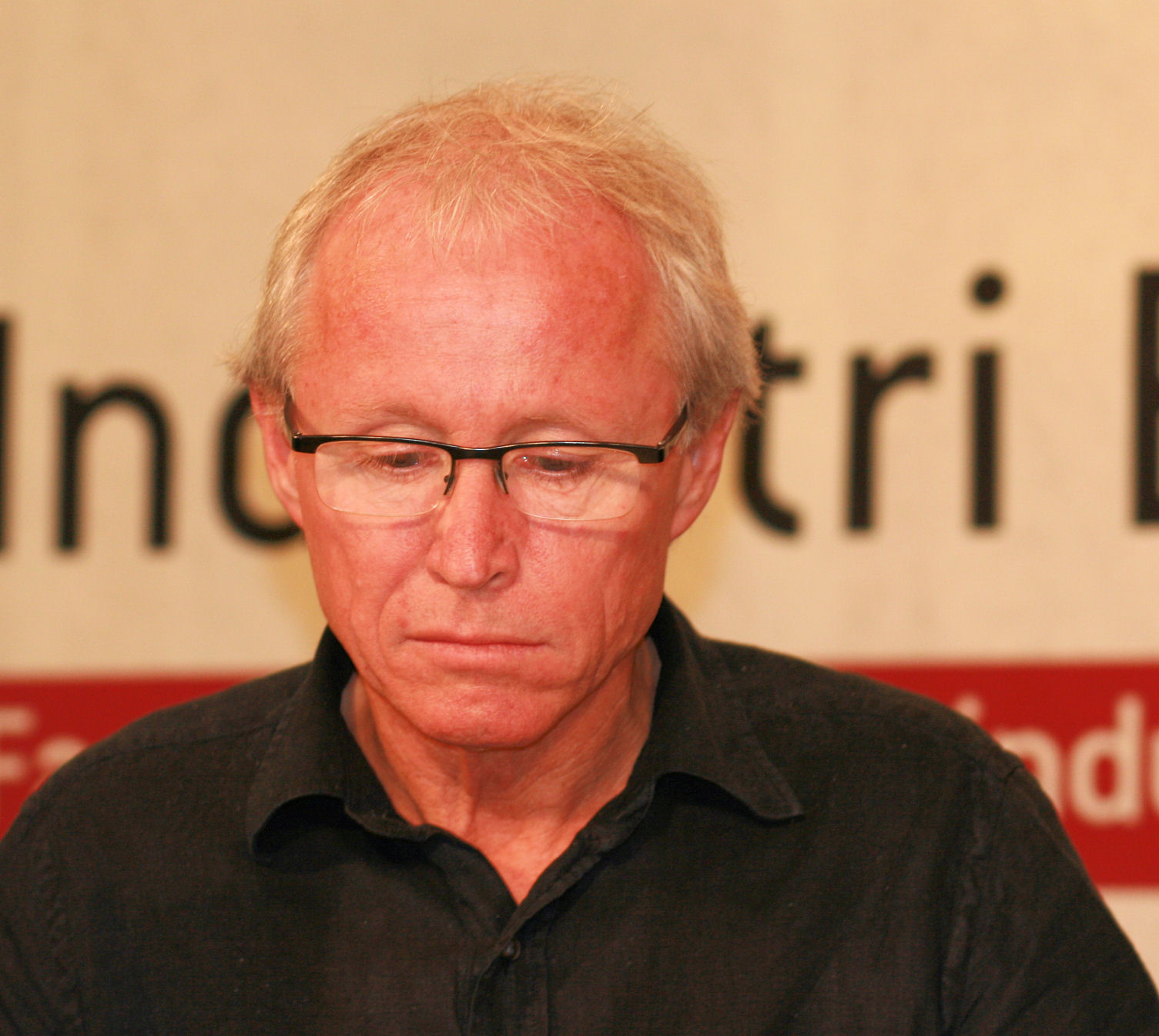
Odd Arild Kvaløy, August 2007.

Odd Arild Kvaløy (born 28 December 1948) is a Norwegian politician for the Centre Party. He is best known as the county mayor of Rogaland from 1991 to 1999, being Rogaland's first county mayor to win re-election.

He was born in Stavanger, and is an agrotechnician by education. He worked in the Felleskjøpet Rogaland Agder, an agricultural cooperative retailer, from 1970 to 1981. He then worked in the Centre Party organization from 1981 to 1987, and in the bank SpareBank 1 SR-Bank from 1988. He served as a private secretary in the Ministry of Transport from 1985 to 1986, in Willoch's Second Cabinet, and private advisor (both positions are today known as political advisor) in the Ministry of Local Government from 1989 to 1990, in Syse's Cabinet. He had experience in local politics, where he was a member of Stavanger city council from 1980 to 1987, the last four years in the executive committee. He was also a city councilman from 1991 to 1995, and a member of Rogaland county council from 1983 to present.

From 1991 to 1999 he served as the county mayor of Rogaland. He first tried to become county mayor after the 1991 election, and managed to edge out right-wing candidate, the incumbent Arne Rettedal. The centrist parties formerly cooperated with the right-wing parties in the county council (as well as in Willoch's and Syse's cabinets), but decided to support a centrist candidate due to unhappiness with Rettedal's leadership. Support from the Norwegian Labour Party swung the vote: Kvaløy received 37 votes in the county council, whereas Rettedal received 28 votes and Kari Oftedal Lima received 6. After the 1995 elections, Labour fielded its own candidate, but in return Kvaløy received the support from Rettedal's Conservative Party as well as the Pensioners Party. Kvaløy received 41 votes, Sven H. Andersen 20 and Ola Ingvaldstad 10. Kvaløy was the first county mayor to win re-election. His successor Roald G. Bergsaker would achieve the same feat.

From 1995 to 1999 Kvaløy led the collegium of county mayors in Norway. In 1994 he became a member of the board (sentralstyre) of the Norwegian Association of Local and Regional Authorities; he advanced to deputy leader in 2000. In 2008 he ceased to be deputy leader, being succeeded by Bjørg Tysdal Moe, but continued as a board member.

For some years Kvaløy represented Norway in the Congress of Local and Regional Authorities of the Council of Europe. In 2005 he was rapporteur for a monitoring report on the situation of Local and Regional Democracy in the Netherlands, with Kathryn Smith, and in 2011 was rapporteur for a report on local and regional democracy in Serbia with Christopher Newbury.

Political offices
Preceded by Arne Rettedal	County mayor of Rogaland; 1991–1999	Succeeded by Roald G. Bergsaker
