= Bent Høie =

Norwegian politician (born 1971)

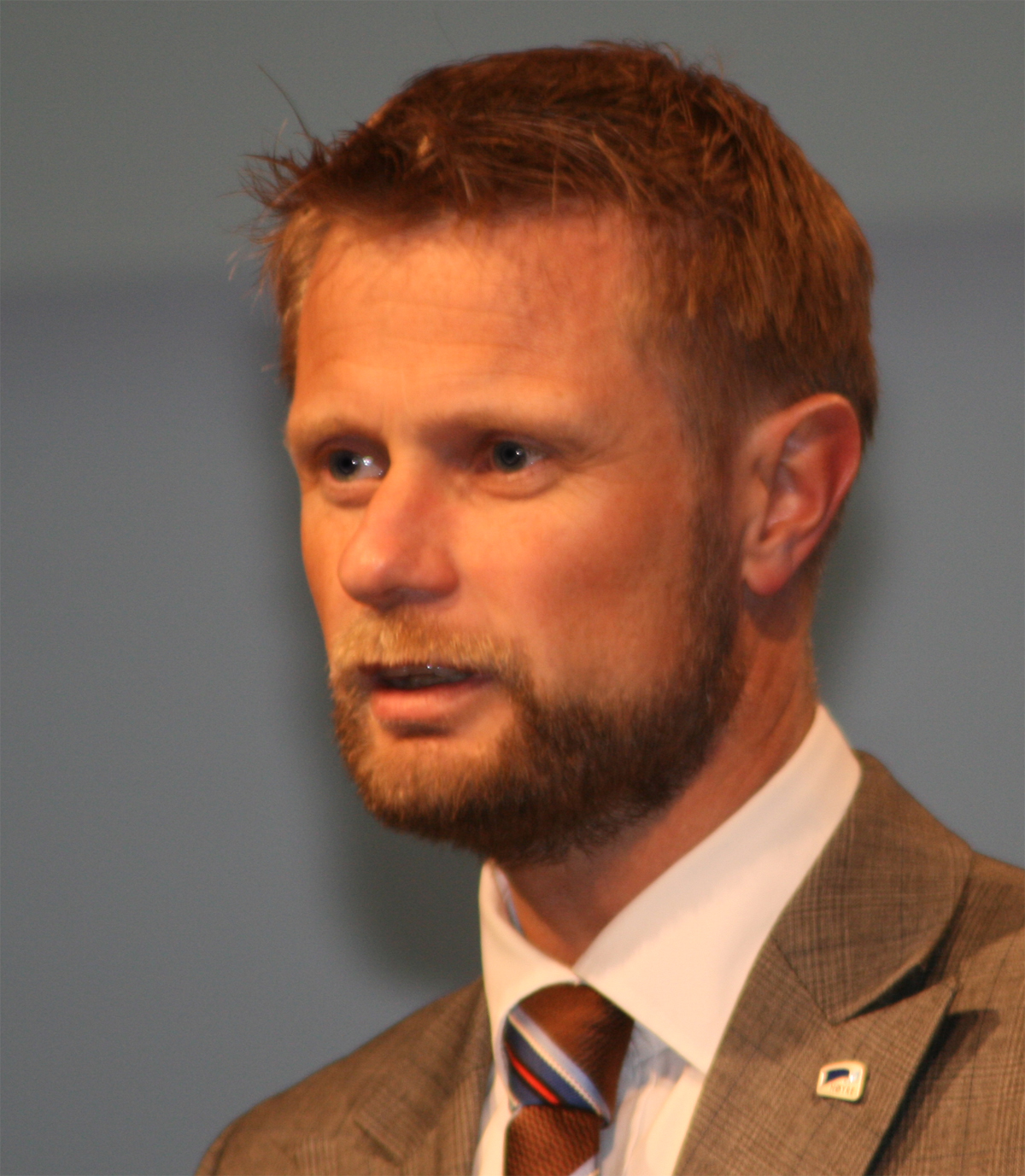
- Høie in 2009

County Governor of Rogaland
- Incumbent
- Assumed office 1 November 2021
- Monarch: Harald V
- Prime Minister: Jonas Gahr Støre
- Preceded by: Lone Merethe Solheim (acting)

Minister of Health and Care Services
- In office 16 October 2013 – 14 October 2021
- Prime Minister: Erna Solberg
- Preceded by: Jonas Gahr Støre
- Succeeded by: Ingvild Kjerkol

Second Deputy Leader of the Conservative Party
- In office 9 May 2010 – 11 September 2020
- Leader: Erna Solberg
- Preceded by: Erling Lae
- Succeeded by: Tina Bru

Member of the Storting
- In office 8 April 2000 – 30 September 2021
- Deputy: Sveinung Stensland; Aleksander Stokkebø
- Preceded by: Jan Johnsen
- Constituency: Rogaland

Deputy Member of the Storting
- In office 1 October 1997 – 8 April 2000
- Member: Jan Johnsen
- Constituency: Rogaland

Personal details
- Born: 4 May 1971 (age 55) Randaberg Municipality, Rogaland, Norway
- Party: Conservative
- Spouse: Dag Terje Solvang (m. 2001; div. 2022)
- Education: University of Bergen

Bent Høie (born 4 May 1971) is a Norwegian politician from the Conservative Party who has served as county governor of Rogaland since 2021. He previously served as Minister of Health and Care Services from 2013 to 2021, and as a member of the Storting from Rogaland from 2000 to 2021.

== Early life and education ==
Høie was born in Randaberg Municipality. He studied law at University of Bergen in 1991 and also attended the Norwegian School of Hotel Management from 1991 to 1993.

== Political career ==
Høie represented his party on the municipal council of Stavanger Municipality and also on the Rogaland County Council. He was elected deputy representative for Rogaland in the Storting in 1997, and succeeded Jan Johnsen as permanent representative following his death on 8 April 2000. Høie was elected for his first term in his own right in 2001. He was re-elected four times since. He didn't seek re-election for the 2021 election.

=== Storting committees ===
- 2005–2009: Member of the Standing Committee on Local Government and Public Administration.
- 2001–2005: Member of the Standing Committee on Health and Social Affairs.
- 2000–2001: Member of the Standing Committee on Energy and the Environment

=== Delegations ===
- 2001- : Deputy member of the Norwegian Delegation to the Nordic Council, deputy member of the Norwegian Delegation to the Parliamentary Assembly of the Council of Europe.

=== Local government ===
- 2000-, 1991-1999: Member of the Rogaland County Council
- 1999-2003: Member of the Stavanger Municipal Council
- 1999-2000: Member of the Rogaland County Executive Board
- 1991-1995: Member of the Randaberg Municipal Council

=== Political appointments ===
- 2000–2002: Chairman of the Stavanger Conservative Party
- 1997–1999: Deputy chairman of the Rogaland Conservative Party
- 1995–1999: Political adviser for the Stavanger Conservative Party group in the Municipal Council
- 1993–1995: Campaign secretary of the Rogaland Conservative Party
- 1993–1995: Member of the Central Executive Committee of the Young Conservatives of Norway
- 1990–1992: Chairman of the Rogaland Young Conservatives

=== Minister of Health and Care Services ===
Høie was appointed minister of health and care services on 16 October 2013, after Erna Solberg became prime minister following the 2013 election.

Early during Høie's tenure, the government sent out a consultation memorandum on proposals for amendments to the Health and Care Services Act and the Patient and User Rights Act, as well as to the GP regulations and regulations on patient and user rights in the GP scheme. The consultation deadline was set for 30 April 2014. The most important proposal in the memorandum was to provide a legal basis for a regulation that gives doctors the right to reserve themselves against referral and treatment in the event of serious conflicts of conscience related to life and death, in practice especially abortion. The proposals, which were a result of the settlement between the Christian Democratic Party, the Conservatives and the Progress Party during the government negotiations in the autumn of 2013, gave rise to much criticism, also from the Conservative party's own ranks.

The proposal, which was called prehistoric by top politicians in its own ranks, was poorly received, which among other things led to a record turnout during the International Women's Day parade on 8 March 2014. Mayors across the country caused trouble for Høie and refused their GPs to reserve against referring to abortion. As a result of the strong opposition, Høie chose to withdraw the proposals.

In March 2016, Høie was appointed by United Nations Secretary-General Ban Ki-moon to the High-Level Commission on Health Employment and Economic Growth, which was co-chaired by presidents François Hollande of France and Jacob Zuma of South Africa.

In 2018, he joined the Task Force on Fiscal Policy for Health, a group convened by Michael Bloomberg and Lawrence Summers to address preventable leading causes of death and noncommunicable diseases through fiscal policy.

In October 2019, Høie criticized skier Andreas Håtveit, who caused controversy when he expressed concern about the level of where the standard was put for leaders in KRIK. In his criticism against Håtveit, he drew comparisons to treatment of LGBT individuals during the 1980s.

During the COVID-19 pandemic in Norway, Høie was a leading figure representing the government, routinely appearing at press conferences alongside prime minister Erna Solberg and health officials announcing new rules, restrictions and regulations.

On 28 September 2020, during the COVID-19 pandemic; Oslo governing mayor Raymond Johansen criticised Høie for having seemingly claimed that the government would overrule Oslo municipality if they didn't apply more harsher restrictions against the decease. Johansen also stated that he had felt pressured by both Høie and the Norwegian Health Directorate. Høie later clarified that he had only meant that the government could overrule the municipality if they didn't come with good enough measures themselves, which would have been in the form of national COVID-19 measures.

In May 2021, Høie expressed gratitude for municipalities who were willing to redistribute vaccines in favour of 24 other municipalities in Eastern Norway.

After the government announced that politicians would be getting vaccines in late May, Høie was one of the ministers who turned down the offer, alongside members of the Storting, both opposition and coalition partners. He expressed that he'd rather wait for his age group in the vaccination lineup before he would get vaccinated.

Following the cabinet's defeat at the 2021 election, he was succeeded by Ingvild Kjerkol on 14 October.

=== Deputy party leader ===
Høie was elected second leader of the Conservative Party at the party convention in 2010. He served as deputy leader for ten years, and didn't seek re-election in 2020. At the convention in September of that year, he was succeeded by Minister of Petroleum and Energy Tina Bru, who had been designated as second deputy in March.

=== County Governor of Rogaland ===
On 26 October 2018, Høie was nominated to become the next county governor of Rogaland, succeeding the Centre Party's Magnhild Meltveit Kleppa. He assumed office on 1 November 2021.

Early into his tenure, Høie met with delegations from Sandnes Municipality and Strand Municipality to discuss the ongoing uncertainty of readjusting Forsand Municipality's border.

Following a referendum in Forsand Municipality in February 2022; where 54% voted in favour and 44% against joining Strand Municipality, Høie later came with the recommendation to do just that. The recommendation was then sent to the Ministry of Local Government and Modernisation for consideration, and subsequent approval. In June, the ministry rejected the proposal for Forsand to join Strand, and that it should stay a part of Sandnes, which caused a stir among pro-Strand champions.

== Other administrative posts ==
- 2000- : Chairman of the board of the Dyslexia Research Foundation

== Personal life ==
Høie is openly gay and married to Dag Terje Solvang. They entered a partnership in 2000, and married the year after. On 4 October 2022, Høie announced that he and Solvang had separated.

He later entered a relationship with Arild Vølstad. The two got engaged in October 2024.

Political offices
Preceded by Jonas Gahr Støre	Minister of Health and Care Services; 2013–2021	Succeeded by Ingvild Kjerkol
Party political offices
Preceded by Erling Lae	Second Deputy Leader of the Conservative Party; 2010–2020	Succeeded by Tina Bru
Civic offices
Preceded by Lone Merethe Solheim; Acting	County Governor of Rogaland; 2021–present	Incumbent
