= Hagemann =

Hagemann may refer to:

== People with the surname Hagemann ==
- Axel Otto Kristian Hagemann (1856–1907), Norwegian politician
- Carl Hagemann (1867–1940), German chemist, industrial manager and art collector
- Fredrik Hagemann (born 1929), Norwegian geologist and bureaucrat
- Gro Hagemann (born 1945), Norwegian historian
- Gustav Adolph Hagemann (1842–1916), Danish engineer and businessman
- Karen Hagemann (born 1955), German-American historian
- Kristian Kornelius Hagemann Brandt (1831–1905), Norwegian military officer and engineer
- Sara Hagemann (born 1979), Danish-born, London-based expert on the European Union
- Sonja Hagemann (1898–1983), Norwegian literary historian and literary critic
- Victoria Hagemann, Swiss Olympic fencer
- Wolf Hagemann (1898–1983), highly decorated Generalleutnant in the Wehrmacht during World War II

== Places ==
- Hagemann Ranch Historic District in Livermore, California

== See also ==
- Hageman (disambiguation)
