= Tore Lindholt =

Norwegian civil servant and politician (1941–2021)

Tore Lindholt (13 October 1941 – 14 November 2021) was a Norwegian economist, civil servant and politician for the Labour Party. He was twice the acting director of the Norwegian State Railways, and Folketrygdfondet from 1990 to 2004.

He was born in Trondheim as a son of Torbjørn Torstensen Lindholt (1916–1982) and Ruth Borgny Lund (1922–2001). He was the oldest of eight children. He graduated from the University of Oslo with a cand.oecon. degree in 1967, and worked as a research fellow from 1968 to 1971. He had short spells in Kreditkassen from 1971 to 1972 and the Ministry of Finance from 1973 to 1974, but mainly worked as an associate professor at the University of Oslo from 1972. He has later stated that he was too "restless" to pursue an academic career.

He was a member of the Labour Party, and was appointed a private secretary (today known as political advisor) in the Ministry of Transport and Communications between 1976 and 1978 as a part of Nordli's Cabinet. In 1978 he was a secretary for the Labour Party parliamentary group for a few months before being hired as chief financial officer in the Norwegian State Railways. When Robert Nordén left as director-general in 1987, Lindholt became acting director-general until 1988. The same thing happened in 1990, when Kjeld Rimberg resigned after two years in the position, only that the position had changed its name from director-general to president.

Board chairman Arne Rettedal was not a supporter of Lindholt. In 1990, Lindholt released the book Avsporing. Kampen om NSB, about the inner circles of the State Railways. In it, he described Rettedal in a less favourable way. Also, according to Lindholt, he got his first spell as acting director-general (1987–1988) because Minister of Transport Kjell Borgen took a personal initiative, unbeknownst to Lindholt, to remove Robert Nordén (Lindholt, Borgen and Nordén were politicians for the Labour Party). Borgen announced his intentions to Lindholt over the telephone.

After leaving the State Railways, Lindholt was the chief executive officer of Folketrygdfondet from 1990 to 2004. He has also been deputy board chairman of Narvesen.

Civic offices
Preceded by Robert Nordén	Director-general of the Norwegian State Railways; 1987–1988 (acting)	Succeeded by Kjeld Rimberg
Preceded by Kjeld Rimberg	President of the Norwegian State Railways; 1990 (acting)	Succeeded by Kristian Rambjør
