= Hageman (surname) =

Hageman is a Dutch toponymic surname. The name is likely topographic for someone who lived by an enclosure, from Middle Dutch haghe ‘hedge’, ‘enclosure’ + man ‘man’. Notable people with the surname include:

- Aimé Haegeman (1861–1935), Belgian equestrian
- Casey Hageman (1887–1964), American baseball pitcher
- Eduard Hageman (1749–1827), Dutch jurist
- Dan Hageman (born 1976), American screenwriter and television producer
- Fred Hageman (1937–2012), American football player
- Hans E. Hageman (born c.1957), American lawyer and educator
- Harriet Hageman (1962), American politician
- James Hageman (1930–2006), American politician
- Johanna Hageman (1918–1984), American baseball player
- John Hageman (1918–1968), American railroad man with Hageman clotting factor deficiency
- Kevin Hageman (born 1974), American screenwriter and television producer
- Ra'Shede Hageman (born 1990), American football player
- Richard Hageman (1881–1966), Dutch-born American conductor, pianist, composer and actor

== See also ==
- Hageman (disambiguation)
- Hagman, Swedish surname
