= Roald G. Bergsaker =

Norwegian sports official and politician

Roald Georg Bergsaker (born 5 July 1942) is a Norwegian sports official and politician for the Conservative Party.

Bergsaker was mayor of Sandnes from 1986 to 1990. He was then a member of Rogaland county council from 1991 to 2007, serving as county mayor from 1999 to 2007.

Bergsaker has been a board member of the Norwegian Confederation of Sports for seven years and of the Norwegian Olympic Committee for four years. In 2007 he tried to become president of the Confederation of Sports, but Tove Paule won the vote at the national convention.

Political offices
Preceded by Odd Arild Kvaløy	County mayor of Rogaland; 1999–2007	Succeeded by Tom Tvedt
