= Opseth =

Opseth is a Norwegian surname. Notable people with the surname include:

- Kjell Opseth (1936–2017), Norwegian politician
- Kristian Opseth (born 1990), Norwegian footballer
- Silje Opseth (born 1999), Norwegian ski jumper
