= Beint Bentsen =

Norwegian banker and politician

Beint Kristian Bentsen (25 July 1917 – 2003) was a Norwegian banker and politician for the Christian Democratic Party. He is best known as county mayor of Rogaland in the 1970s, but was also a member of four different municipal councils, an unusual achievement.

He was born in Nes Municipality in Vest-Agder county. He started a career as a banker from 1940, and was hired as an office manager in Den norske Creditbank in Sandnes in 1959. He was promoted to director in 1966, and remained there until 1984. From 1984 to his retirement in 1986 he worked as a consultant for Sandnes municipality.

He was a member of the municipal councils of Nes Municipality, Madla Municipality, and Høyland Municipality before moving to Sandnes Municipality. He served as a municipal councilman there from 1965 to 1976. During his local-political career he held a number of important positions: he was deputy mayor of Madla from 1958 to 1959, and in Sandnes he was deputy mayor in 1972 and 1973 and mayor in 1974 and 1975. Since 1968 he was also a member of Rogaland county council, and following the 1975 local elections he was elected as county mayor (fylkesordfører) for the term 1976 to 1979. He had previously been deputy county mayor from 1972 to 1976. The opposition's candidate for county mayor, Christian August Thoring of the Norwegian Labour Party, received 24 votes in the county council, whereas Bentsen received 47.

Bentsen was also involved in the scouting movement, in the Norwegian Missionary Society and in various congregational councils within the Church of Norway. He was married since 1942, had three children, and lived in Sandnes in his later life. He died in early 2003.

Political offices
Preceded by	County mayor of Rogaland; 1976–1979	Succeeded by John S. Tveit
