= Sveinung Stensland =

Norwegian politician

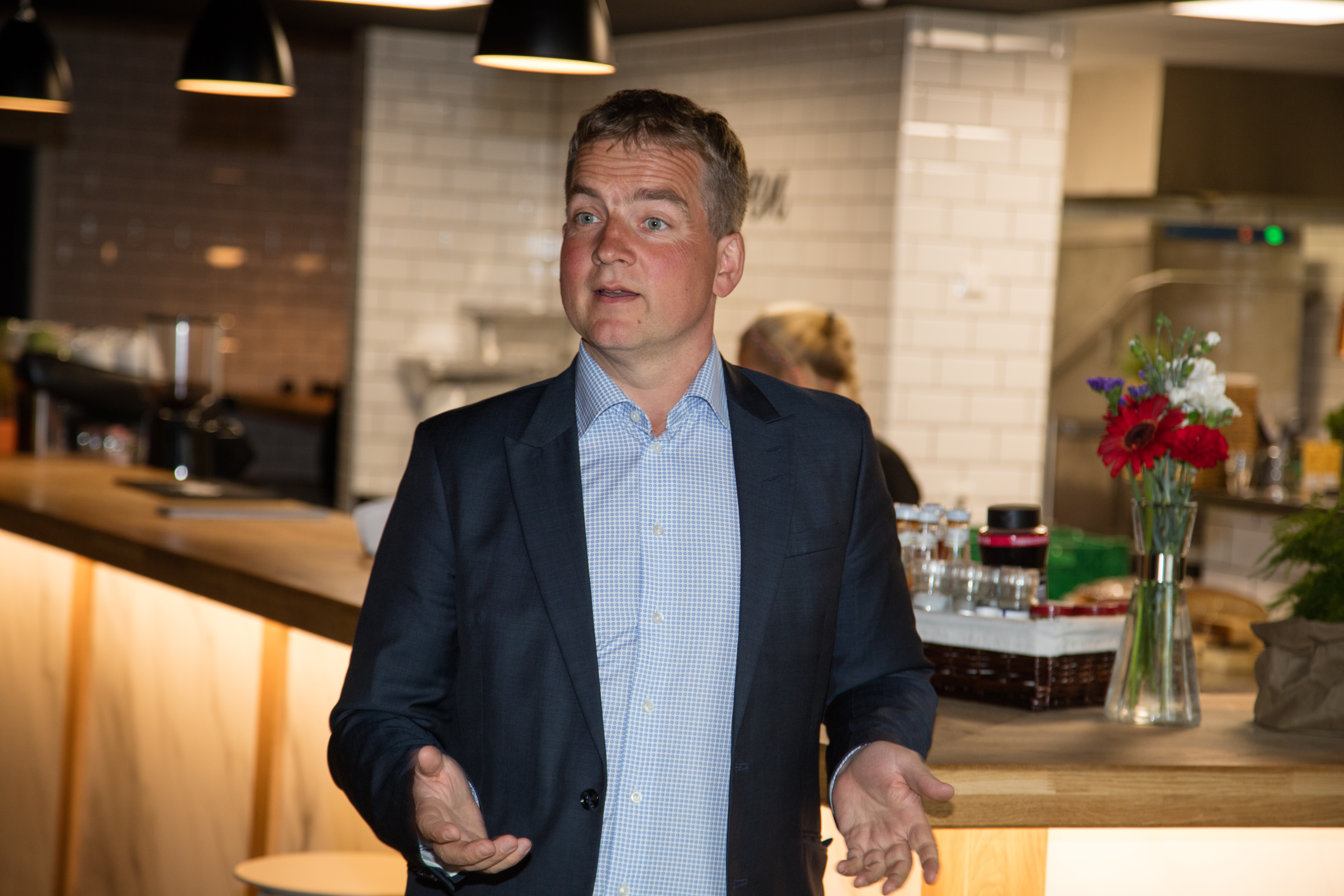

Member of the Storting
- Incumbent
- Assumed office 1 October 2017
- Constituency: Rogaland

Deputy Member of the Storting
- In office 1 October 2013 – 30 September 2017
- Deputising for: Bent Høie
- Succeeded by: Aleksander Stokkebø
- Constituency: Rogaland

Personal details
- Born: 6 November 1972 (age 53) Haugesund, Rogaland, Norway
- Party: Conservative
- Education: University of Oslo
- Occupation: Pharmacist; Apothecary; Politician

Sveinung Stensland (born 6 November 1972) is a Norwegian politician for the Conservative Party. A deputy to the Storting from Rogaland from 2013, he met as deputy for Bent Høie during the 2013–2017 Storting period. He was elected as an ordinary member of the Storting from 2017, and was re-elected in 2021.

== Personal life and education ==
Born in Haugesund, Stensland was a son of businessman Karl Johan Stensland (1937–2018) and teacher Aud Fjeldheim (1940–). His father was a city councilman for several years.

He graduated in pharmacology from the University of Oslo in 1997, and has later worked as pharmacist, apothecary and administrator in the pharmacy chain Apotek 1.

== Political career ==
=== Local politics ===
Stensland chaired the Conservative Party in Tysvær Municipality from 2002 to 2005, and in Haugesund Municipality from 2006 to 2007, and chaired the Conservative party in Rogaland county from 2011 to 2016. He was a member of the municipal council in Haugesund Municipality from 2007 to 2015, and a member of the Rogaland county council from 2007 to 2013.

=== Parliament ===
He was elected as deputy to the Storting from Rogaland in 2013. He met as deputy for Bent Høie in the 2013–2017 Storting period. From 2013 to 2017, he was a member of the Standing Committee on Health and Care Services. From 2014 to 2015, he was a delegate to the United Nations General Assembly. He was elected as an ordinary representative to the Storting for the period 2017–2021. He continued his membership of the Standing Committee on Health and Care Services, and was the second vice chair of the committee from 2017 to 2021. Having been re-elected to the Storting for the period 2021–2025, Stensland became a member of the Standing Committee on Justice from 2021, also serving as second vice chair. In April 2024, he announced that he wouldn't seek re-election at the 2025 election.

Two days before the revised budget for 2022 was presented in November 2021, Stensland said that justice minister Emilie Enger Mehl had to "get out of the campaign fog", and that the police didn't need more stations, but more officers. He also criticised what he called the Centre Party's "reversal-mania", which he alleged would damage national security and police preparedness.

On 5 December 2021, after justice minister Emilie Enger Mehl had notified of a reversal of the courts reform, Stensland criticised the decision. He said that multiple levels of the justice sector disagreed, and also referred to a parliamentary response from Mehl, where she had said that the reform would be upheld in places "unless the head of the court, the municipalities in the court district and the employees through the scribes agree to maintain the current structure". He also stated that Mehl had already broken her governmental promise.

In early January 2022, he expressed concern that the Norwegian Police Service was in the process of requiring new drones made by Chinese manufacturer DJI. He also asked for justice minister Emilie Enger Mehl to halt the process until all necessary questions regarding the possible security issues were answered.

In April, minister of justice Emilie Enger Mehl had stated that "regular people" should be listened to in regards to the courts reform, and also stated that one should "listen less to judicial experts in Oslo". Stensland expressed shock over her criticism. While he agreed that regular people should be listened to, he criticised the minister's approach to the issue. His sentiments was shared by the Progress Party and Socialist Left Party.

In January 2023, Stensland stated that his party's confidence in justice minister Emilie Enger Mehl was weakened following controversy surrounding her usage of TikTok on her work phone.

=== Other ===
Stensland was a board member of Navamedic from 2002 to 2006, Rockfest from 2008 to 2011, of the International Research Institute of Stavanger from 2011 to 2014, and of the Western Norway Regional Health Authority from 2012 to 2014. He was also chairman of the board of the foundation Rogaland Kurs- og Kompetansesenter from 2011 to 2014, and of Haugaland Industri from 2013 to 2018.
