= Jan Reinås =

Jan Audun Reinås (19 July 1944 – 13 August 2010) was a Norwegian businessperson.

== Early career ==
Reinås was educated in business administration through the Norwegian State Railways. He first worked for the bus and ferry company Fosen Trafikklag, before taking over as chief financial officer of Trondheim Trafikkselskap (TT), the bus and tram company in Trondheim, in 1983. In 1984, Reinås became the company's second CEO, after Arne Watle. When TT was converted from a municipal agency to a limited company, the board chose to give Reinås a raise of NOK 50,000, giving him a wage exceeding even the chief of administration. Along with his successor Gunnar Reitan, Reinås helped developed TT from a company focused around operational costs, to a company focused on a broader aspect of service, and they managed to increase the ridership during the late 1980s. He also led the company through parts of a heated controversy over whether Trondheim should have a tramway or not. He left TT in March 1986 and started working for Scandinavian Airlines System (SAS).

== Later career ==
Reinås was chief executive officer of Scandinavian Airlines System from 1993 to 1994, and of Norske Skog from 1994 to 2003. In 2003 he was elected chairman of Norsk Hydro. He was forced to withdraw after an options scandal in the company on 5 August 2007, after Minister of Trade and Industry, Dag Terje Andersen (Labour) pressured him to resign his position in the partially state-owned company. Reinås was also chairman of Sparebanken Midt-Norge, Postverket and the Norwegian State Railways.

== Controversy ==
Reinås received criticism for his decisions both as CEO of Norske Skog and as Chairman of Norsk Hydro. In the ten years he led Norske Skog, the company grew enormously, concentrating solely on newsprint and purchasing other plants for NOK 50 billion. At the same time the corporation sold non-newsprint mills, power stations, forest properties and other non-core activities. After Reinås retired, critics felt that he had left Norske Skog in a strategic impossible situation. The newsprint market was falling constantly, primarily because of over production in North America as well as because of reduced circulation of newspapers. This has left the newsprint market in chronic overproduction, making profitability impossible. Unlike other large paper corporations, such as Stora Enso, Norske Skog was left without other types of paper production to support it. By 2007 the share value was under the 1993 level, and the company was constantly struggling before filing for bankruptcy in 2017.

== Death ==
He died at the age of 66 of cancer.

Preceded by Arne Rettedal	Chair of the Norwegian State Railways; 1995–1996	Succeeded by —
