= Bente Nyland =

Norwegian geologist (born 1958)

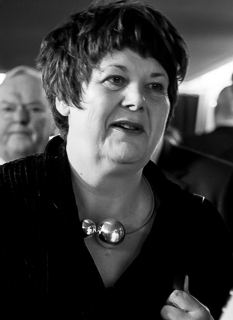
Nyland in 2016

Bente Nyland (born 12 August 1958) is a Norwegian geologist. She was Director General of the Norwegian Petroleum Directorate from 1 January 2008 to 2019, having been appointed by the Government of Norway in a cabinet meeting on 21 December 2007.

She is a fellow of the Norwegian Academy of Technological Sciences.

Preceded by Gunnar Berge	Director of the Norwegian Petroleum Directorate; 2007–2019	Succeeded by Ingrid Sølvberg
