= Leif Haraldseth =

Norwegian trade unionist and politician (1929–2019)

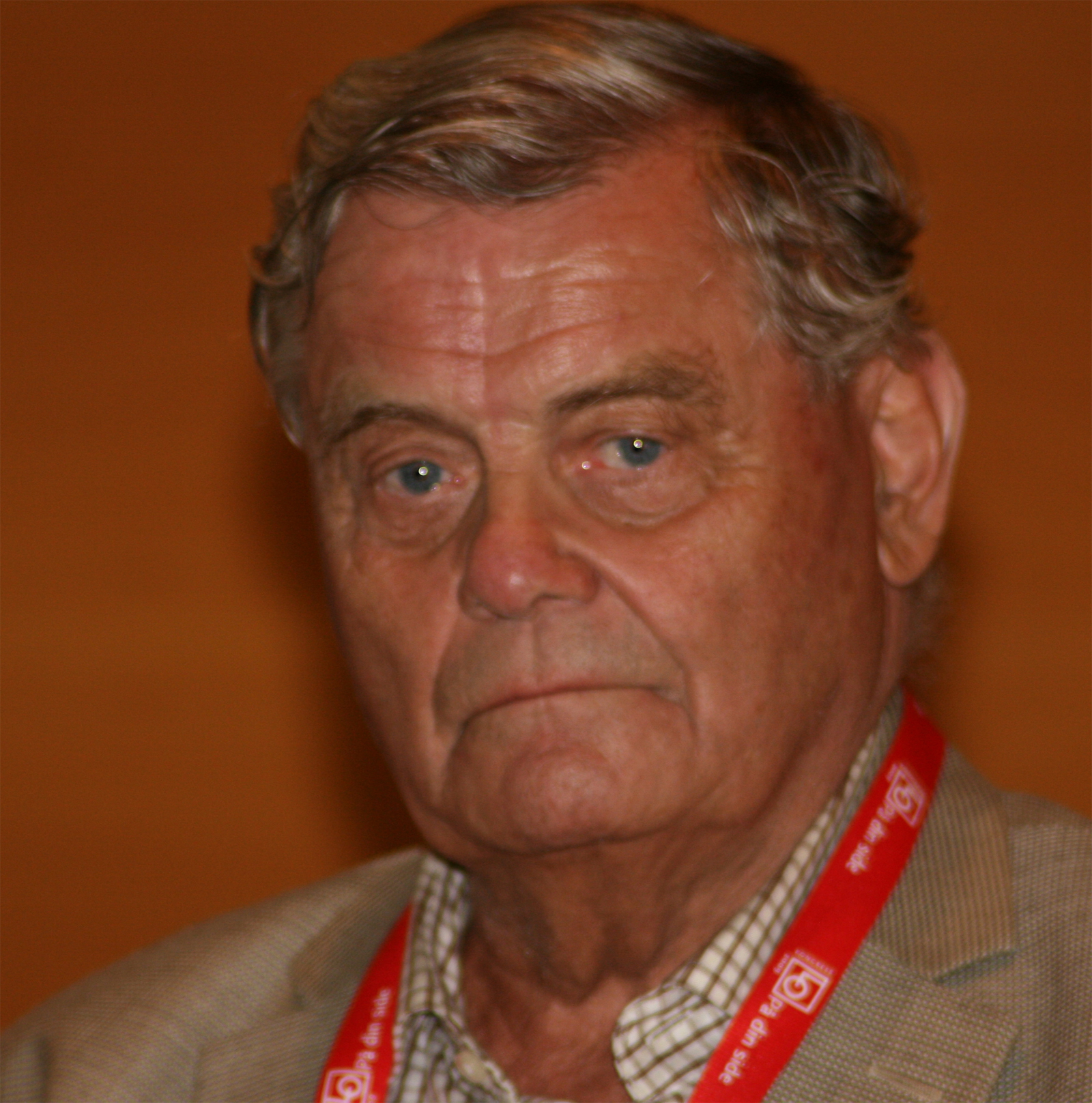
- Haraldseth in 2009.

County Governor of Buskerud
- In office 1989–1999
- Preceded by: Ragnar Christiansen
- Succeeded by: Jon A. Lea

Leader of the Norwegian Confederation of Trade Unions
- In office 1987–1989
- Preceded by: Tor Halvorsen
- Succeeded by: Yngve Hågensen

Minister of Local Government
- In office 9 May 1986 – 20 February 1987
- Prime Minister: Gro Harlem Brundtland
- Preceded by: Arne Rettedal
- Succeeded by: William Engseth

Personal details
- Born: 30 November 1929 Drammen, Buskerud, Norway
- Died: 8 April 2019 (aged 89) Drammen, Buskerud, Norway
- Party: Labour

Leif Haraldseth (30 November 1929 – 8 April 2019) was a Norwegian trade unionist and politician for the Labour Party.

== Early life ==
Leif Haraldseth was born in Drammen as a son of worker Hans Haraldseth (1905–1977) and housewife Ingrid (1907–1999). He finished secondary education in 1947, was a delivery boy in the Norwegian State Railways for two years, then attended the Railway School and worked as a telegrapher in the State Railways from 1951 til 1965.

== Trade unionism and politics ==
In 1965 he was hired as district secretary of the Norwegian Confederation of Trade Unions in Buskerud. In 1969 he was promoted to secretary and in 1977 to vice chairman of the organization. On both occasions he replaced Odd Højdahl.

From 1986 to 1987 he was the Minister of Local Government in Brundtland's Second Cabinet. He then headed the Norwegian Confederation of Trade Unions from 1987 to 1989. At the same time he was a central board member of the Labour Party.

In international labour affairs he was a delegation member to the International Labour Organization from 1970 to 1979, board member of the Norwegian ILO Committee from 1983 to 1986, and from 1985 to 1989 a board member of the Council of Nordic Trade Unions and vice president of the European Trade Union Confederation. He chaired the Norwegian Support Committee for Spain from 1977 to 1984 and the International Solidarity Committee of the Norwegian Labour Movement from 1985 to 1989. His career in politics ended with the post of County Governor of Buskerud, which he held from 1989 to 1999.

Haraldseth was a board member of Buskerud Industriselskap (1966–1970), the National Institute of Technology (1973–1977), Sydvaranger (1973–1978), Folk og forsvar (1973–1979, deputy chair), Feriefondet (1973–1986), the National Wages Board (1977–1986), the Norwegian Agency for Development Cooperation (1977–1980), the Industry Fund (1978–1982), the Norwegian Directorate of Labour (1979–1980), the Norwegian Labour Inspection Authority (1980–1984), the Norwegian Guarantee Institute for Export Credits (1981–1986), Samvirke (1985–1989), Fafo Foundation (1987–1989, chair) and Norsk Hydro (1988–1998). He was a council member of Norsk Produktivitetsinstitutt (1980–1981) and the Labour Court of Norway (1988–1989), and chaired the supervisory council of Landsbanken (1985–1989).

Political offices
Preceded by Arne Rettedal	Minister of Local Government; 1986–1987	Succeeded by William Engseth
Preceded by Ragnar Christiansen	County Governor of Buskerud; 1989–1999	Succeeded by Jon Arvid Lea (acting)
Trade union offices
Preceded by Tor Halvorsen	Leader of the Norwegian Confederation of Trade Unions; 1987–1989	Succeeded by Yngve Hågensen
