= Jon Arvid Lea =

Norwegian civil servant (born 1948)

Jon Arvid Lea (born 9 September 1948) is a Norwegian civil servant.

He is a cand.polit. by education. He was a head of department in the Norwegian Ministry of Government Administration from 1994. In 1997 he was acting County Governor of Hedmark, and from 1999 to 2001 he was acting County Governor of Buskerud. After a year as director of secondary schools in Vestfold County Municipality, from 2002 to 2003, he was hired as the first director of the Norwegian Directorate for Civil Protection and Emergency Planning.

Civic offices
Preceded by Ola Skjølaas (acting)	County Governor of Hedmark (acting); 1997	Succeeded by Sigbjørn Johnsen
Preceded by Leif Haraldseth	County Governor of Buskerud (acting); 1999–2001	Succeeded by Kirsti Kolle Grøndahl
Preceded by position created	Director of the Norwegian Directorate for Civil Protection and Emergency Planning; 2003–present	Incumbent
