= John S. Tveit =

Norwegian politician (1931–2022)

John S. Tveit (18 December 1931 – 6 September 2022) was a Norwegian politician for the Christian Democratic Party.

== Life and career ==
John S. Tveit was born in Tysvær Municipality on 18 December 1931, as a son of carpenter and smallholder Guttorm Oliver Tveit (1895–1977) and housewife Serine Thuestad (1908–2004). He took secondary education, and worked as an office clerk in the regional center, Haugesund, from 1949 to 1954. He then moved back to Tysvær, operating his own company Tysvær Handel from 1955 to 1973. From 1974 to 1979 he worked with administration and secretary tasks for the municipality.

By that time he was involved in politics. He was a member of the municipal council of Tysvær Municipality from 1959 to 1964, and then served as mayor from 1967 to 1971. He chaired the local party chapter from 1965 to 1967. From 1967 to 1983 he was also a member of Rogaland county council, serving the last four years, from 1979 to 1983, as county mayor (fylkesordfører). He also served as a deputy representative to the Parliament of Norway from Rogaland during the terms 1969–1973, 1973–1977 and 1977–1981. He was then elected to a regular seat in the 1985 election, and re-elected in 1989. He chaired the Standing Committee on Local Government and the Environment for his first term, then he chaired the Standing Committee on Transport and Communications. From 1985 to 1987 he was the second deputy leader of the Christian Democratic Party.

After leaving national politics, Tveit returned as director of commerce in Tysvær municipality from 1993 to 1997. He was also a member of the county school board from 1976 to 1979, deputy chair of the local savings bank from 1974 to 1979, board member of Rogalandsforskning from 1976 to 1979, Det Stavangerske Dampskibsselskap from 1981 to 1986 and Haugaland Kraft from 1998 to 2000. He was a member of Regionplanrådet for Nord-Rogaland from 1968 to 1976, and then chaired it from 1976 to 1984. Denominationally, he was a Pentecostal. He lived in Tysværvåg.

Tveit died on 6 September 2022, at the age of 90.

Political offices
Preceded by Beint Bentsen	County mayor of Rogaland; 1979–1983	Succeeded by Lars Vaage
Preceded by Solveig Torsvik	Chair of the Standing Committee on Transport; 1989–1993	Succeeded by Magnus Stangeland
