= Hilde Bojer =

Norwegian economist and politician (born 1939)

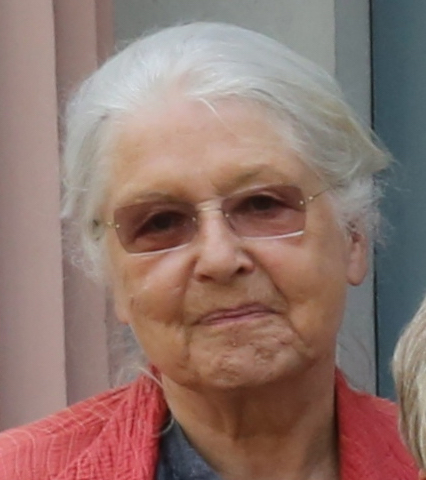
Image of Hilde Bojer

Hilde Bojer (born 29 November 1939) is a Norwegian economist and politician for the Socialist Left Party.

She was born in Oslo as a daughter of Halvard Lange Bojer. While studying at the University of Oslo she joined Sosialistisk Studentlag. She graduated with the cand.oecon. degree and eventually became an associate professor of economics at the University of Oslo. Among her posts within the university, she was a vice dean from 1985 to 1987 and head of the Department of Economics from 1993 to 1998. Her book Distributional Justice. Theory and Measurement was issued on Routledge in 2003.

Bojer was the deputy leader of the Socialist Left Party from 1979 to 1983. She was elected to Oslo city council from 1971 to 1975 and then as a deputy representative to the Parliament of Norway from Oslo for the terms 1981–1985 and 1985–1989. She met during 95 days of parliamentary session.

A Festschrift to her honor was issued when Bojer turned 70 years old, containing articles as well as an interview with then-leader of the Socialist Left Party, Kristin Halvorsen. Her memoirs Glimt av et liv were published in 2023.
