= Aleksander Stokkebø =

Norwegian politician (born 1994)

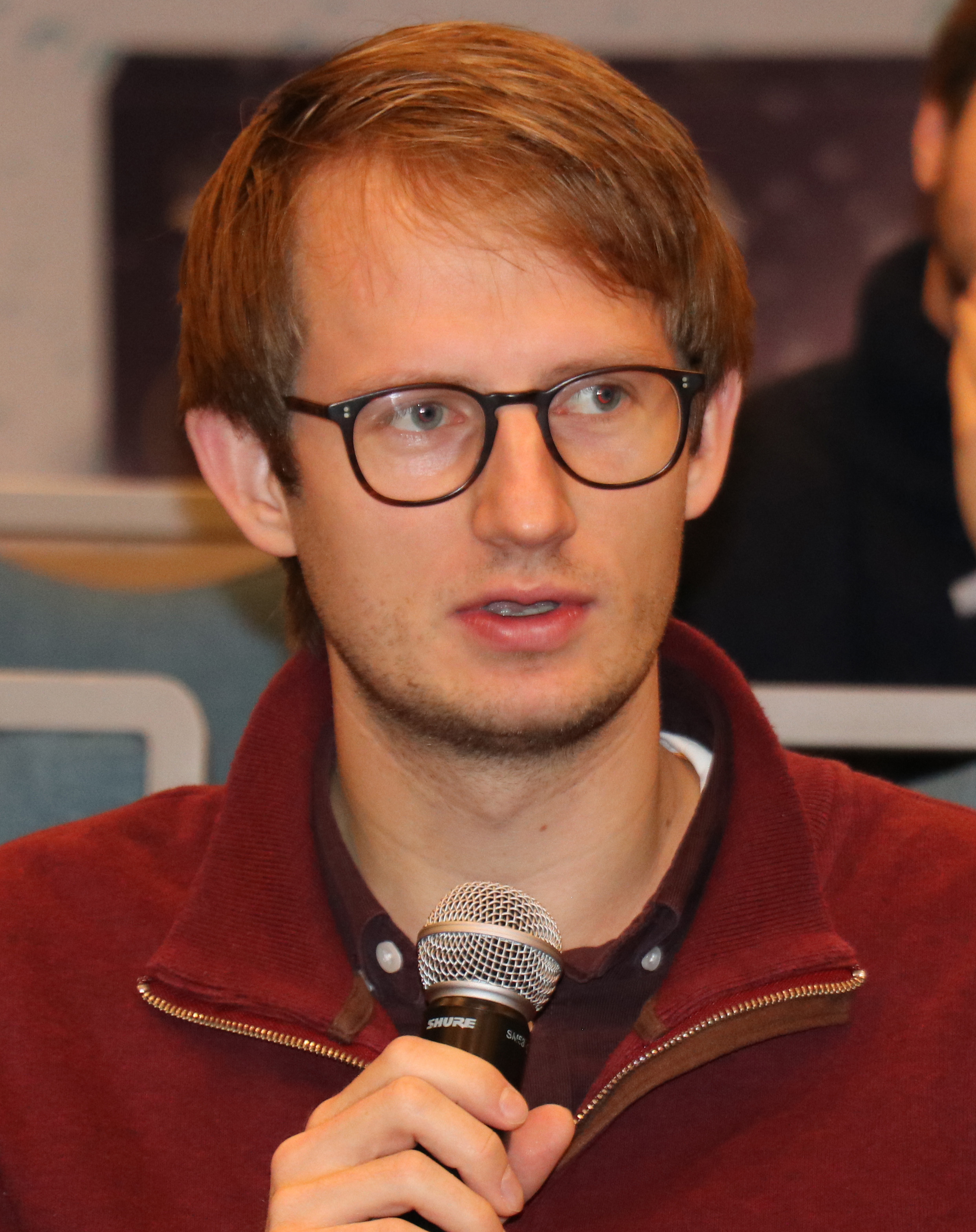

Member of the Storting
- Incumbent
- Assumed office 1 October 2021
- Constituency: Rogaland

Deputy Member of the Storting
- In office 1 October 2017 – 30 September 2021
- Deputising for: Bent Høie
- Preceded by: Sveinung Stensland
- Constituency: Rogaland

Personal details
- Born: 2 November 1994 (age 31) Stavanger, Rogaland, Norway
- Party: Conservative
- Occupation: Politician

Aleksander Stokkebø (born 2 November 1994) is a Norwegian politician from the Conservative Party. He has served as an MP from Rogaland since 2021.

== Political career ==
=== Parliament ===
He was elected deputy representative to the Storting for the period 2017–2021 for the Conservative Party. He deputised for Bent Høie in the Storting from 2017 to 2021, before winning a permanent seat in the 2021 election.
