= Inger Louise Valle =

Norwegian politician (1921-2006)

Minister of Children and Equality
- In office 17 March 1971 – 18 October 1972
- Prime Minister: Trygve Bratteli
- Preceded by: Elsa Skjerven
- Succeeded by: Solveig Sollie (1989)

Minister of Justice
- In office 16 October 1973 – 8 October 1979
- Prime Minister: Trygve Bratteli; Odvar Nordli
- Preceded by: Petter Mørch Koren
- Succeeded by: Andreas Z. Cappelen

Minister of Local Government
- In office 8 October 1979 – 3 October 1980
- Prime Minister: Odvar Nordli
- Preceded by: Arne Nilsen
- Succeeded by: Harriet Andreassen

Minister of Government Administration and Consumer Affairs
- In office 8 May 1972 – 18 October 1972
- Prime Minister: Trygve Bratteli
- Preceded by: Position established
- Succeeded by: Eva Kolstad

Member of the Norwegian Parliament
- In office 1 October 1977 – 30 September 1981
- Constituency: Akershus

Personal details
- Born: 28 November 1921 Oslo, Norway
- Died: 21 May 2006 (aged 84) Bærum, Norway
- Party: Labour
- Spouse(s): Helge Grund (1944–1956); Øystein Valle (1958–2006; her death)
- Children: Jan Grund
- Profession: Criminologist

Inger Louise Valle (28 November 1921 – 21 May 2006) was a Norwegian politician for the Labour Party, particularly noted for her efforts to reform the Norwegian penal system. She is the mother of professor Jan Grund.

== Biography ==
She represented Akershus in the Norwegian Parliament in the period between 1977 and 1981. She also served as Minister of Administration and Consumer Affairs 1971-1972 and Minister of Family and Consumer Affairs in 1972, Minister of Justice and the Police 1973-1976 and 1976–1979, and Minister of Local Government Affairs 1979–1980. Valle also served in the local government of Bærum, and was Norway's first Consumer Ombudsman.

Born into a privileged family and educated as an attorney, Valle was one of the first ministers of justice whose main career had been in politics. Her views on the Norwegian penal system were grounded in humanistic principles founded in criminology, and several of her proposals for reform met with controversy. In particular the so-called "Criminal report" in 1978 (Stortingsmelding 104, 1977-1978) caused considerable controversy. The report asserted that the deterrent effect of stiff penalties was a myth, and that policy toward criminals should be based in broader considerations than penology. It didn't help matters much that she enlisted Arne Haugestad, who had already gained notoriety in the campaign against Norwegian membership in the European Community, as the director of Norway's penal system. Among other things, he recommended eliminating prison sentences as punishment for crimes for financial gain.

The controversy gained steam in the fall of 1978, when professor of law Johs Andenæs critiqued the report in a meeting arranged by the Conservative Party, claiming that the principles were coddling criminals and threatening law and order. The year after in April 1979, Valle pressured prime minister Nordli to push through Stortinget, against all advice and recommendations the total abolition of the death penalty in Norway. Valle quickly found herself isolated, even now within her own party. Much of the blame for the Labour Party's relatively poor showing in the 1979 elections were put at her feet.

Even among her detractors, she is noted for her moral courage and commitment to humanistic values. Although many of her proposed reforms never were implemented, some were, notably raising the age of criminal accountability and including community service in the penal system.

Valle headed the Norwegian executive committee for UN's International Women's Year in 1975.

Political offices
Preceded by Elsa Skjerven	Minister of Family and Consumer Affairs; 1971—1972	Succeeded by Eva Kolstad
Preceded by position created	Norwegian Consumer Ombudsman; 1973–1981	Succeeded by Hans Petter Lundgaard
Preceded by Petter Mørch Koren	Minister of Justice and the Police; 1973–1979	Succeeded by Andreas Zeier Cappelen
Preceded by Arne Nilsen	Minister of Local Government and Regional Development; 1979–1980	Succeeded by Harriet Andreassen
Preceded by	Director of the Norwegian Directorate of Rationalisation; 1981–1986	Succeeded by
