= Waldemar Hoff =

- Born: 22 May 1886
- Died: 16 July 1947 (aged 61)
- Occupation: railway director

Leonard Waldemar Hoff (22 May 1886 – 16 July 1947) was a Norwegian railway director.

He was hired in Norsk Hovedjernbane in 1906, and was a traffic inspector from 1916. In 1933 he was promoted to district director in Drammen, and in 1939 he was promoted to director-general of the Norwegian State Railways. During the occupation of Norway by Nazi Germany he was deposed. He applied to get his position back after the occupation's end, but in 1946 he rescinded the claim as he was hired as regional director of the European Central Inland Transport Organization. He died in July 1947.

His daughter Anne-Marie Hoff, born 1915, married Trygve Meinstad, a former resistance member who became the Norwegian State Railways district director in Oslo in 1962, and chaired Østfold Bilruter and Hadeland Bilselskap.
