= Hageman =

Hageman may refer to:

- Hageman (surname)
- Hageman factor, another name for coagulation factor XII

Places

- Hagemans Crossing, Ohio, an unincorporated place in Ohio, United States
- Hageman Farm, a historic house in New Jersey, United States
- Hageman Peak

== See also ==
- Hagemann (disambiguation)
