= Sonja Hagemann =

Norwegian literary historian and critic

- Born: 6 September 1898; Kristiania, Norway
- Died: 17 October 1983 (aged 85)
- Occupation: literary historian
- Children: Fredrik Hagemann
- Awards: Arts Council Norway Honorary Award

Sonja Hagemann (6 September 1898 – 17 October 1983) was a Norwegian literary historian and literary critic, especially of children's literature. She is primarily known for the monumental Barnelitteratur i Norge (Norwegian Children's Literature I: 1965; II: 1970; III: 1973).

== Biography ==
She was raised in Christiania (now Oslo) Norway. She graduated with a degree in economics at the University of Oslo (1919). She first worked in government service. She worked at Dagbladet as a critic of children's literature (1946-1971). She received the Arts Council Norway Honorary Award (Norsk kulturråds ærespris) in 1980. She represented the Liberal Party on the Oslo school board. She was a parliamentary ballot candidate from the constituency of Oslo in 1965.

She was married to Otto Holmboe Hagemann (1891–1961) in 1925 and was the mother of geologist Fredrik Hagemann.

Awards
Preceded by Harald Sæverud	Recipient of the Norsk kulturråds ærespris 1980	Succeeded by Erling Stordahl
