= 1979 Norwegian local elections =

Election

Country-wide local elections for seats in municipality and county councils were held throughout Norway in 1979. For most places this meant that two elections, the municipal elections and the county elections ran concurrently.

== Results ==
=== Municipal elections ===
Results of the 1979 municipal elections.

Party	Votes	%
Labour Party	768,423	35.85
Conservative Party	625,974	29.21
Christian Democratic Party	210,937	9.84
Centre Party	182,248	8.50
Liberal Party	111,250	5.19
Socialist Left Party	88,147	4.11
Progress Party	40,928	1.91
Liberal People's Party	21,893	1.02
Red Electoral Alliance	14,614	0.68
Communist Party	5,942	0.28
Others	72,877	3.40
Total	2,143,233	100.00

=== County elections ===
Results of the 1979 county elections.

Party	Votes	%
Labour Party		36.0
Conservative Party		29.9
Christian Democratic Party		10.2
Centre Party		8.6
Liberal Party		5.3
Socialist Left Party		4.4
Progress Party		2.5
Liberal People's Party		1.3
Red Electoral Alliance		0.8
Communist Party		0.5
Others		0.6
Total		
