= Robert Nordén =

Robert Fredrik Nordén (27 September 1926 – 29 July 1998) was a Norwegian economist, civil servant and politician for the Labour Party. He was the director of the Norwegian State Railways from 1978 to 1988.

He was born in Oslo, and was a cand.oecon. by education. He was appointed state secretary in the Ministry of Transport and Communications on 15 August 1960 as a part of the Gerhardsen's Third Cabinet. On 6 January 1961 he left office and was hired as deputy under-secretary of state, an administrative position in the department.

In 1969 he was appointed director in the Norwegian State Railways, and in 1978 he became director-general. He left in 1987, and Tore Lindholt became acting director-general. Nordén worked as an advisor in the Ministry of Petroleum and Energy from 1988 to 1992.

Civic offices
Preceded by Edvard Heiberg	Director-general of the Norwegian State Railways; 1978–1987	Succeeded by Tore Lindholt (acting)
