= Gunnar Berge =

Norwegian politician (born 1940)

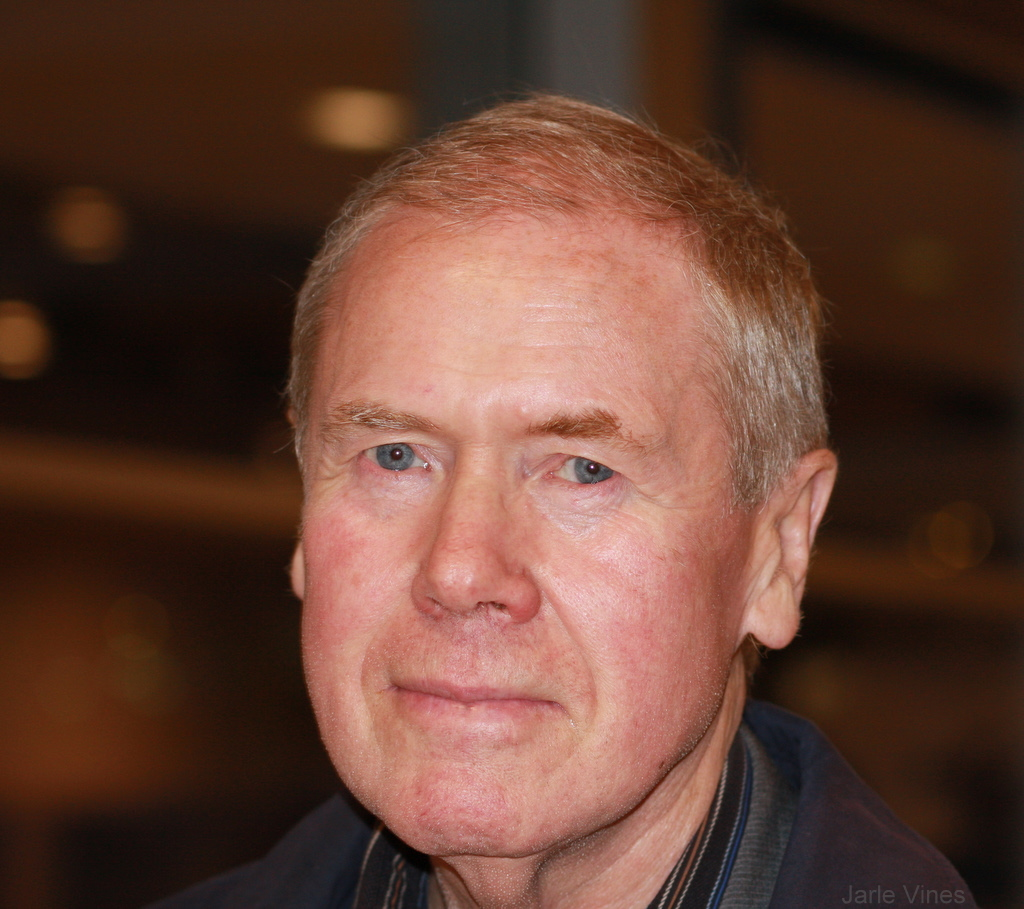
- Berge in 2010 (photo by Jarle Vienes)

Minister of Local Government
- In office 4 September 1992 – 25 October 1996
- Prime Minister: Gro Harlem Brundtland
- Preceded by: Kjell Borgen
- Succeeded by: Kjell Opseth

Minister of Nordic Cooperation
- In office 4 September 1992 – 25 October 1996
- Prime Minister: Gro Harlem Brundtland
- Preceded by: Kjell Borgen
- Succeeded by: Grete Knudsen

Minister of Finance
- In office 9 May 1986 – 16 October 1989
- Prime Minister: Gro Harlem Brundtland
- Preceded by: Arne Skauge
- Succeeded by: Arne Skauge

Member of the Norwegian Parliament
- In office 1 October 1969 – 30 September 1993
- Constituency: Rogaland

Personal details
- Born: 29 August 1940 (age 85) Etne Municipality, Hordaland, Norway
- Party: Labour
- Spouse: Gunvor Wahlberg

Gunnar Berge (born 29 August 1940) is a Norwegian politician for the Labour Party, born in Etne Municipality, Hordaland. Berge represented Rogaland in the Norwegian Parliament from 1969 to 1993. He was Minister of Finance 1986–1989, Minister of Local Government and Regional Development 1992–1996, as well as minister of Nordic Cooperation 1992–1996. After his political career he was Director General of the Norwegian Petroleum Directorate 1996–2007. He was also member of the Norwegian Nobel Committee from 1997 to 2002, as leader from 2000 to 2002. In 2011, he published the autobiography Til Kongen med fagbrev.

Political offices
Preceded by Rolf Presthus	Norwegian Minister of Finance; 1986–1989	Succeeded by Arne Skauge
Preceded by Kjell Borgen	Norwegian Minister of Local Government and Nordic Cooperation; 1992–1996	Succeeded by Kjell Opseth
Civic offices
Preceded by Fredrik Hagemann	Director of the Norwegian Petroleum Directorate; 1997–2007	Succeeded by Bente Nyland
Other offices
Preceded by Francis Sejersted	Leader of the Norwegian Nobel Committee; 2000–2002	Succeeded by Ole Danbolt Mjøs
