= 1975 Norwegian local elections =

1975 election for the municipalities and counties of Norway

Country-wide local elections for seats in municipality and county councils were held throughout Norway in 1975. For most places this meant that two elections, the municipal elections and the county elections ran concurrently. This was also the first time ever county elections were held in Norway.

== Results ==
=== Municipal elections ===
Results of the 1975 municipal elections.

Party	Votes	%
Labour Party	732,311	37.97
Conservative Party	420,073	21.78
Christian Democratic Party	221,258	11.47
Centre Party	207,254	10.75
Socialist Left Party	105,975	5.49
Liberal Party	71,498	3.71
Progress Party	15,205	0.79
Red Electoral Alliance	7,215	0.37
Others	147,963	7.67
Total	1,928,752	100.00

=== County elections ===
Results of the 1975 county elections.

Party	Votes	%	Seats
Labour Party	730,612	38.15	425
Conservative Party	432,870	22.60	233
Christian Democratic Party	234,871	12.26	143
Centre Party	214,626	11.21	134
Socialist Left Party	108,947	5.69	62
Liberal Party	73,482	3.84	45
Progress Party	27,710	1.45	0
Red Electoral Alliance	8,913	0.47	1
Others	83,142	4.34	56
Total	1,915,173	100.00	1,099
