= Hans E. Hageman =

Hans E. Hageman (born c. 1958) became Executive Director of Boys and Girls Harbor in January 2002.

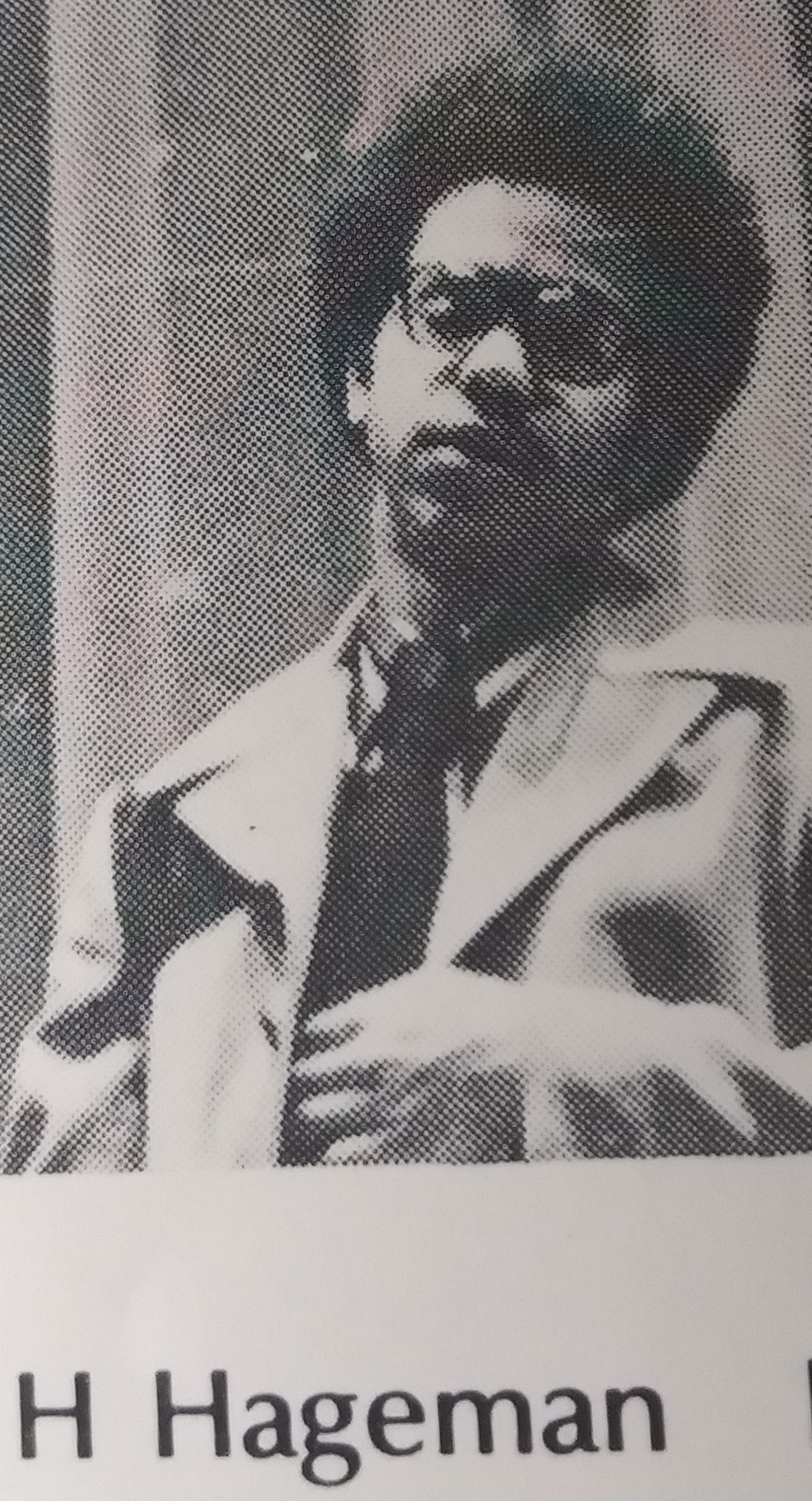
Hageman in 11th grade (from the Collegiate School yearbook, 1975)

Hageman graduated with honors from Collegiate School for Boys, received a B.A. from Princeton University in 1980 and a J.D. from Columbia University School of Law.

In 1992, he co-founded and served as Executive Director for The East Harlem School at Exodus House located in East Harlem, New York City.

In 2002, he founded the Sulaxmi School for Girls in Lucknow, India.

In 2005, he founded the Emily N. Carey Harbor School in East Harlem, New York City.

He has also held positions as a Manhattan assistant district attorney in the Office of Special Narcotics Prosecution, as chief counsel for the Neighborhood Defender Service of Harlem, and as minority chief counsel and staff director of the U.S. Senate's Constitution subcommittee.

== Sources ==
- Richardson, Clem. "His family business is love of children", New York Daily News, 2007-05-21, p. 38.
