= Norwegian Offshore Directorate =

- Sokkeldirektoratet

Agency overview
- Formed: 14 July 1972
- Jurisdiction: Government of Norway
- Headquarters: Stavanger
- Employees: 210
- Agency executive: Bente Nyland
- Parent agency: Norwegian Ministry of Petroleum and Energy
- Website: www.npd.no (until 2023) www.sodir.no (from 2024)

The Norwegian Offshore Directorate (Norwegian: Sokkeldirektoratet) is a Norwegian government agency responsible for the regulation of the petroleum resources on the Norwegian continental shelf. Based in Stavanger, its mission is to ensure that the petroleum resources are allocated in an optimal way, at the same time incurring minimal environmental impact. It is subordinate to the Norwegian Ministry of Petroleum and Energy.

== History ==
The agency was created by Storting on 14 July 1972 with the responsibility of managing the petroleum resources. It was originally part of the Ministry of Industry, but became part of the Ministry of Petroleum and Energy when it was created in 1978. From 1 January 2004 the division related to labour and safety issues was made a separate agency, the Petroleum Safety Authority Norway, that became part of the Ministry of Labour and Social Inclusion. From the establishment in 1972 until 1997 the agency was led by Fredrik Hagemann, from then until 2007 by Gunnar Berge, when Bente Nyland took over.

In 2023, it was announced that it would change its name from the Norwegian Petroleum Directorate to the Norwegian Offshore Directorate, effective 1 January 2024.
