= 1983 Norwegian local elections =

1983 election for the municipalities and counties of Norway

Country-wide local elections for seats in municipality and county councils were held throughout Norway in 1983. For most places this meant that two elections, the municipal elections and the county elections ran concurrently.

== Results ==
=== Municipal elections ===
Results of the 1983 municipal elections.

Party	Votes	%
Labour Party	793,903	38.29
Conservative Party	535,500	25.83
Christian Democratic Party	176,659	8.52
Centre Party	159,946	7.71
Progress Party	111,925	5.40
Socialist Left Party	107,959	5.21
Liberal Party	93,623	4.52
Red Electoral Alliance	23,768	1.15
Liberal People's Party	11,966	0.58
Communist Party	4,319	0.21
Others	53,934	2.60
Total	2,073,502	100.00

=== County elections ===
Results of the 1983 county elections.

Party	Votes	%
Labour Party		38.9
Conservative Party		26.4
Christian Democratic Party		8.8
Centre Party		7.2
Progress Party		6.3
Socialist Left Party		5.3
Liberal Party		4.4
Red Electoral Alliance		1.2
Liberal People's Party		0.7
Communist Party		0.4
Others		0.3
Total		
