= Kjell Opseth =

Norwegian politician

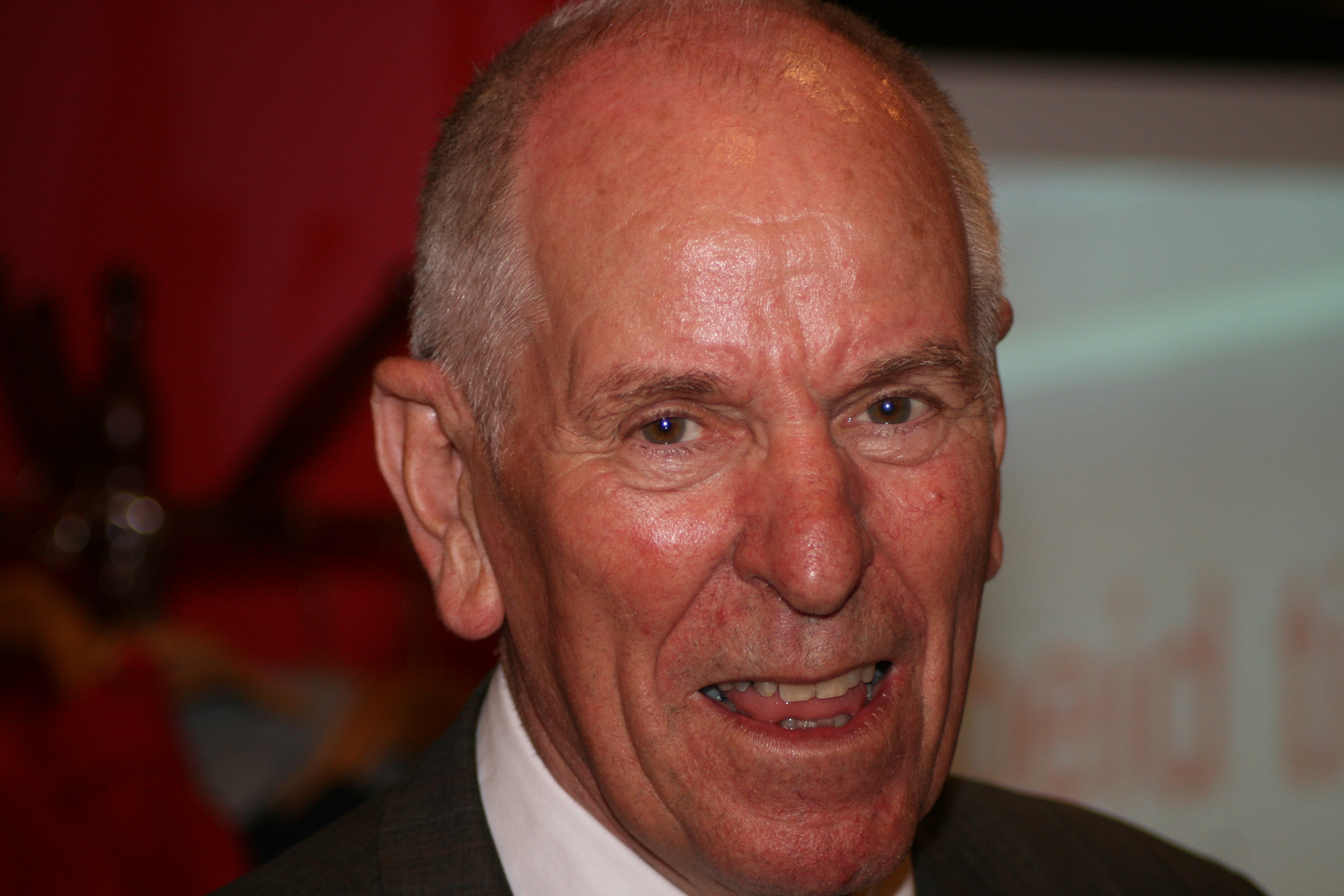
- Opseth in 2009.

Minister of Local Government
- In office 25 October 1996 – 17 October 1997
- Prime Minister: Thorbjørn Jagland
- Preceded by: Gunnar Berge
- Succeeded by: Ragnhild Haarstad

Minister of Transport and Communications
- In office 3 November 1990 – 25 October 1996
- Prime Minister: Gro Harlem Brundtland
- Preceded by: Lars Gunnar Lie
- Succeeded by: Sissel Rønbeck

Member of the Norwegian Parliament
- In office 1 October 1981 – 30 September 2001
- Constituency: Sogn og Fjordane

Personal details
- Born: Kjell Olav Opseth; 2 January 1936 Førde, Sogn og Fjordane, Norway
- Died: 3 December 2017 (aged 81) Førde, Sogn og Fjordane, Norway
- Party: Labour
- Spouse: Hjørdis Årberg (m. 1963)

Kjell Olav Opseth (2 January 1936 – 3 December 2017) was a Norwegian politician for the Labour Party. He was Minister of Transport and Communications 1990–1996 and Minister of Local Government Affairs 1996–1997. As Transport Minister, he once observed of advertising hoardings featuring model Anna Nicole Smith that "on her own [she] is not a traffic hazard. It depends where she is." He died on 3 December 2017 aged 81.

Political offices
| Preceded by Gunnar Berge | Norwegian Minister of Local Government and Regional Development; 1996–1997 | Succeeded by Ragnhild Haarstad |
| Preceded by Lars Gunnar Lie | Norwegian Minister of Transport and Communications; 1990–1996 | Succeeded by Sissel Rønbeck |
