= Ragnhild Queseth Haarstad =

Norwegian politician (1939–2017)

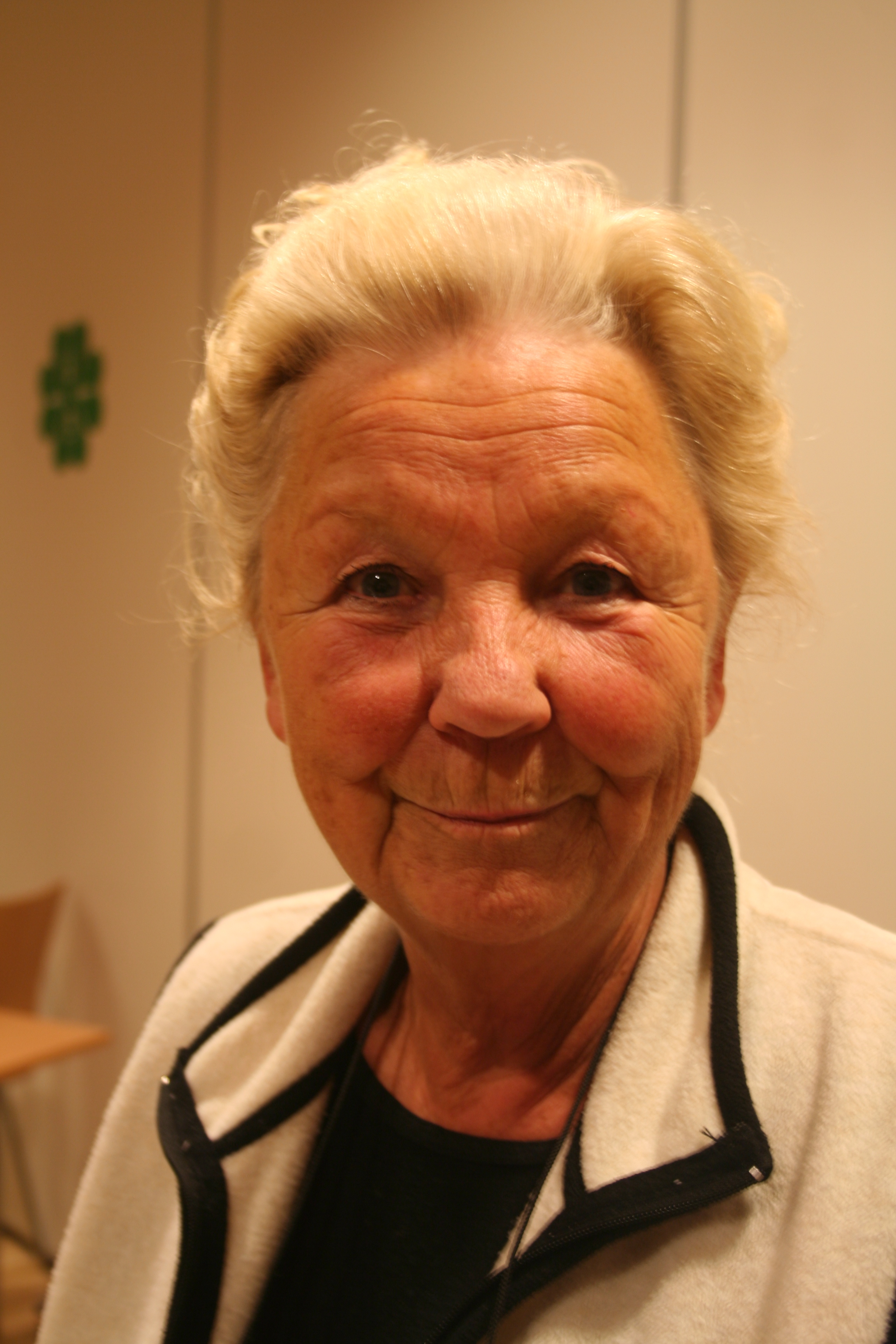
- Haarstad in 2010.

Minister of Local Government
- In office 17 October 1997 – 16 March 1999
- Prime Minister: Kjell Magne Bondevik
- Preceded by: Kjell Opseth
- Succeeded by: Odd Roger Enoksen

Minister of Nordic Cooperation
- In office 17 October 1997 – 16 March 1999
- Prime Minister: Kjell Magne Bondevik
- Preceded by: Grete Knudsen
- Succeeded by: Peter Angelsen

Member of the Norwegian Parliament
- In office 1 October 1981 – 30 September 1997
- Constituency: Hedmark

Personal details
- Born: 4 April 1939 Grue, Norway
- Died: 6 June 2017 (aged 78) Oslo, Norway
- Party: Centre

Ragnhild Queseth Haarstad (4 April 1939 – 6 June 2017) was a Norwegian politician for the Centre Party. She was a member of Parliament from 1981 to 1997 and Minister of Local Government from 1997 to 1999.

== Early life ==
She was born in Grue as a daughter of farmers. After basic education she took commerce school in 1957, and then attended the Conservatory of Music from 1957 to 1959. She also attended courses in stenography, housekeeping and agronomy. In March 1961 in Grue Church she married farmer Harald Haarstad from Grue. After that she was a housewife.

== Political career ==
Queseth Haarstad entered politics, first as board member of Hedmark Centre Party from 1968 to 1970. She subsequently chaired Hedmark Centre Party Women from 1970 to 1974. She was elected as a politician as well, first as a member of the municipal council of Grue Municipality from 1971 to 1975, and then as a member of Hedmark county council from 1975 to 1982. She also chaired the county agricultural board from 1975 to 1977 and the county school board from 1977 to 1979 (sitting as a member until 1982). She was a central board member of the Centre Party from 1973 to 1977 and 1988 to 1994, the latter term while chairing the Centre Women nationwide.

Haarstad was elected as a deputy representative to the Parliament of Norway from Hedmark in 1973 and 1977. She was then elected as a full member in 1981, 1985, 1989 and 1993. Among others, she was a member of the Election Committee for three of her four terms, was deputy leader of the Standing Committee on Education and Church Affairs from 1985 to 1989 and leader of the Standing Committee on Energy and the Environment from 1993 to 1997. While her last term as an MP ended in 1997, the Centre Party then formed Bondevik's First Cabinet, where Haarstad was appointed as Minister of Local Government. She remained such until 1999.

Haarstad was a board member of NAVF from 1980 to 1982 and of the Utvalget for menneskerettigheter from 1985 to 1994. She then held board memberships mainly within culture. She sat on the Arts Council from 1997 to 2000 and on the jury to decide the new opera house in 1999–2000. In the 2000s she chaired the boards of Kongsvinger Museum, Kvinnemuseet and the Museum for Forest Finn Culture in Norway. From 2010 and 2013 she was a member of Statens seniorråd. She died on 6 June 2017 at the age of 78.

Political offices
| Preceded by Kjell Opseth | Norwegian Minister of Local Government and Regional Development; 1997–1999 | Succeeded by Odd Roger Enoksen |
Party political offices
| Preceded by Anne Lise Hessen Følsvik | Leader of the Centre Women; 1988–1994 | Succeeded by Marit Tingelstad |
