= Leif Thue =

Norwegian trade unionist

- Born: June 12, 1928 (age 97); Balestrand, Norway
- Occupation: Trade union leader
- Years active: 1976-1992

Leif Thue (12 July 1928 – 13 June 1993) was a Norwegian trade unionist.

He was born in Balestrand Municipality. He served as leader of the Norwegian Union of Railway Workers from 1984 to 1992, having served as deputy leader from 1976 to 1984 and secretary from 1971 to 1976. As union leader he was also a board member of the Norwegian State Railways. He became a notable public figure in the late 1980s and early 1990s, when the State Railways were restructuring, several directors came and went, and privatization was discussed.

He was also a member of the Labour Party, and served two terms on the municipal council for Spydeberg Municipality. He retired from working life in 1992, and was proclaimed an honorary member of his union. He died in June 1993.
