= Fredrik Hagemann =

Norwegian geologist and bureaucrat (1929–2019)

Fredrik Hagemann (4 March 1929 – 12 June 2019) was a Norwegian geologist and bureaucrat.

He was born in Andenes as the son of literary historian and literary critic Sonja Hagemann. He graduated with the cand.real. degree, and worked in the Norwegian Geological Survey from 1957 to 1966. responsible for petroleum issues (seksjonssjef) in the Norwegian Ministry of Industry from 1966 to 1972 and then Director of the Norwegian Petroleum Directorate from 1972 to 1997. His successor Gunnar Berge had been appointed already in 1990, but waited several years to take the post; during this period Hagemann was the acting Petroleum Director.

Civic offices
Preceded by position created	Director of the Norwegian Petroleum Directorate; 1972–1997	Succeeded by Gunnar Berge
