= Norwegian Building Authority =

Norwegian government agency

- Direktoratet for byggkvalitet
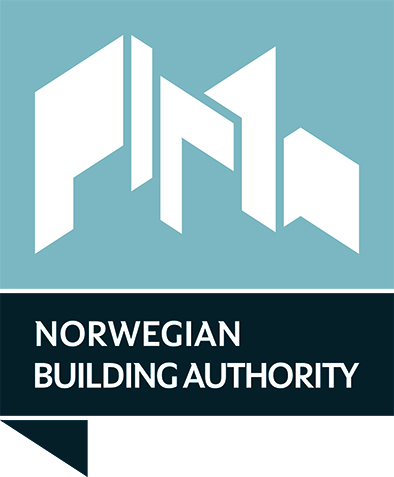

Agency overview
- Superseding agency: Statens byggtekniske etat
- Jurisdiction: Government of Norway
- Headquarters: Oslo
- Agency executive: Per-Arne Horne, Director General
- Parent agency: Norwegian Ministry of Local Government and Regional Development
- Website: dibk.no

The Norwegian Building Authority (Norwegian: Direktoratet for byggkvalitet) is a Norwegian government agency responsible for managing laws and rules related to building and construction, authorises rules related to documentation of construction materials and their properties, as well as approving companies related to the Plan and Building Act. The agency gives however jurisdiction to local municipalities, along with the County Governor, in appealing individual building permits.

Previously the National Office of Building Technology and Administration (Statens bygningstekniske etat), since 1 January 2012, the office is named the Norwegian Building Authority (Direktoratet for byggkvalitet).

== Organization ==
The Norwegian Building Authority is organized into five departments:

1. Department of Construction Process
2. Department of Products and Systems
3. Department for Central Approval
4. Department for Communication
5. Department of Internal Services

The agency has offices at Marabous gt 13, Oslo with the exception of the Department for Central Approval which is located in Gjøvik, Oppland.

The agency is subordinate to the Norwegian Ministry of Local Government and Regional Development and located in Oslo.

== Regulations ==
While newer editions are being revised and edited, the current applicable process and design regulations are:

- SAK10 – Regulations for building permit application and handling, quality control, inspection, and guidelines for qualifying individual and organizations.
- TEK17 – Regulations for technical building limitations which adopt guidelines from Norsk Standard and SINTEF.
