= Jan Johnsen =

Norwegian politician (1941–2000)

- Born: 23 July 1941; Stavanger, Norway
- Died: 8 April 2000 (aged 58)
- Occupation: Politician

Jan Johnsen (23 July 1941 – 8 April 2000) was a Norwegian politician.

== Biography ==
Johnsen was born in Stavanger to Olga and Johan Johnsen. He was elected representative to the Storting for the period 1997–2001 for the Conservative Party, from the constituency of Rogaland. Upon his death he was replaced by Bent Høie.
