= Kristian Rambjør =

Norwegian businessperson (1938–2015)

Kristian Rambjør (24 February 1938 – 4 February 2015) was a Norwegian businessperson.

He hailed from Frei Municipality, but left home at the age of 15 to work at Akers mekaniske verksted in Oslo. He also took a secondary education and a multitude of courses, and then a three-year maritime engineering education in Bergen.

He advanced in the ranks of Akers Mek. and headed the corporate staff in Aker Norcem from 1987 to 1988. He then embarked on a turbulent banking career, as chief executive officer of Den norske Creditbank from 1988 to 1990, then vice chief executive in Den norske Bank in 1990. From 1990 to 1995 he was the president of the Norwegian State Railways He was removed with a golden parachute of 2.8 million kr.

He resided in Tjøme Municipality and was active in the Conservative Party there. He died in February 2015.
