= Harriet Andreassen =

Norwegian politician (1925–1997)

Minister of Local Government
- In office 3 October 1980 – 14 October 1981
- Prime Minister: Odvar Nordli; Gro Harlem Brundtland
- Preceded by: Inger Louise Valle
- Succeeded by: Arne Rettedal

Personal details
- Born: 6 May 1925 Vikna Municipality, Nord-Trøndelag, Norway
- Died: 10 February 1997 (aged 71) Rælingen Municipality, Akershus, Norway
- Party: Labour

Harriet Andreassen (6 May 1925 – 10 February 1997) was a Norwegian labour activist and politician for the Labour Party. Born in Vikna Municipality, she served as secretary of the union Norsk Arbeidsmandsforbund (Union of Norwegian Working Men) from 1967 to 1977, and of the Norwegian Confederation of Trade Unions (LO) from 1977 to 1985. On 3 October 1980, upon the resignation of Inger Louise Valle, she was appointed Minister of Local Government in the government of Odvar Nordli (1976–1981), and remained in this position throughout the short-lived first government of Gro Harlem Brundtland in 1981.

Political offices
Preceded by Inger Louise Valle	Norwegian Minister of Local Government and Regional Development; 1980–1981	Succeeded by Arne Rettedal
