= Norwegian municipal elections =

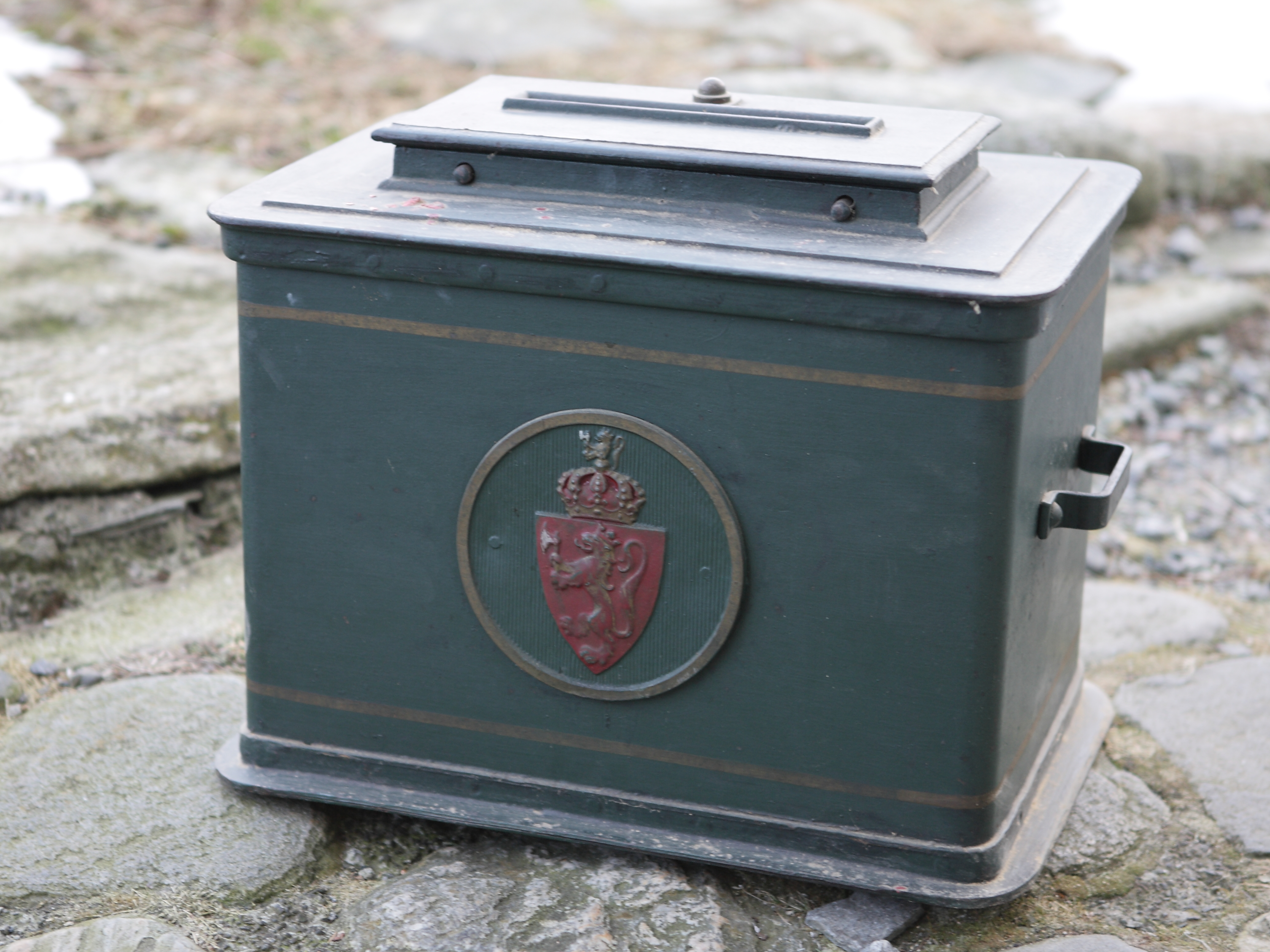
Old ballot box from Selje municipality, Sogn og Fjordane, Norway

In Norway, municipal elections are local elections held every four years to elect representatives to the Norwegian municipality ("kommune") councils. They are conducted concurrently with Norwegian county elections. The last municipal and council elections were held on 11 September 2023. Norway holds elections every two years, alternating between local elections and national parliamentary elections.

Municipal elections were first held in Norway in 1837.

== Suffrage ==
The electorate includes all Norwegian citizens of age 18 or higher (must be at least 18 by the end of the year), and who reside, or who have resided in Norway. In addition, other residents who have lived continuously in Norway for the preceding three years may vote. Residents of Norway who are citizens of another Nordic country need only to have been resident in Norway on 30 June in the year of the election in order to be allowed to vote.

The voter's residency as of 30 June determines which municipality and election the voter will vote in.

== Ballots ==
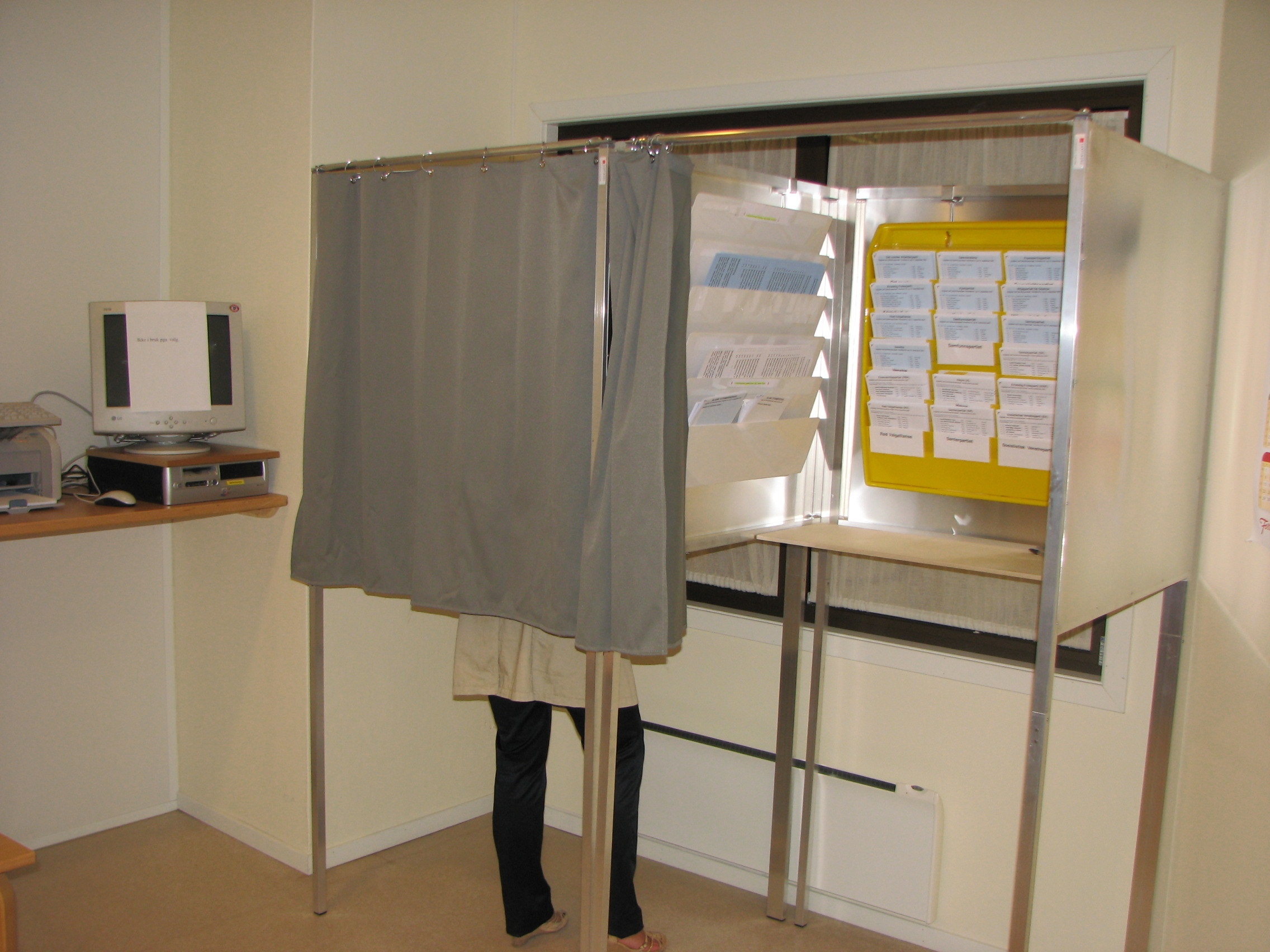
An election booth with ballots lined up for the voter (picture is from an early voting station). White ballots are used in the municipal election, the blue are for the county.

In general, each political party who participates in an election for a particular municipality nominates a list of names which appear on the ballot. It is possible for parties to cooperate on a single ballot however. For the municipality elections, the ballots are printed on white paper, distinguishing them from the blue ballots used in the county election. Both municipality and county ballots are kept in the voting booth at the polling stations.

The ballot itself consists of a list of names, each with a checkbox beside it. Candidates given priority by the party are entered in bold. Voters are allowed to give "personal votes" (personstemme) to people on the ballot by putting a mark next to their name. Also on the ballot is a table allowing voters to write in candidates who are running for another party. Voters can give personal votes to candidates on other ballots (so called "danglers") by entering the candidate's name in the table.

After the voter has selected the ballots, and making whatever adjustments desired, the voter folds the ballot together, hiding the information on the inside, thereby keeping the vote secret. An election official checks the person's identity and stamps the ballot, validating it, before it is inserted into the election box.

The system with folded and stamped ballots has been criticized, because studies show that about 10% of voters fold the ballot the wrong way, exposing rather than hiding their choice. This can lead to suspicions that this "mistake" is sometimes done intentionally in a scheme of electoral fraud. If someone "buys" a vote, the bought voter can "accidentally" reveal his choice to confirm that she or he upheld his or her part of the deal. Utilizing envelopes to increase the security of the elections has been suggested.

== Determining seat allocation ==
The apportionment of seats between the parties is done by St Lagües modified method, described below.

The number of votes each party received is counted. Due to the transferral of votes due to the danglers, the number of votes may well be fractions. Danglers are personal votes given to a candidate although the voter voted for another party. A voter who has given a dangler transfers a portion of the vote to the other party. So if there are 30 seats in the council, and a person votes Labor but writes in a personal vote to a person on the Conservative list, Labor gets 29/30 of a vote, while the Conservative list gets 1/30 of a vote.

Quotients are determined by dividing the number of votes each party received by 1.4, then by 3, 5, 7, 9, and so on. The quotients are then ranked from largest to smallest. The party boasting the highest quotient is given the first seat, the one with the second highest the second, and so on until all the seats have been distributed. This gives approximately a proportional representation in the council.

== Personal votes and priority candidates ==
After the number of seats won by a list for the council is determined, the number of personal votes received, whether directly from someone supporting the list, or from danglers, by each candidate determines which ones will take the seats. Parties wishing to give priority to particular candidates may do so, and they will receive what amounts to a quarter personal vote per person voting for their party.

In the case of a tie, the order in which the candidate stands on the ballot determines who is elected.
