= County municipality (Norway) =

Elected body of a Norwegian county

A county municipality in Norway (Norwegian: Fylkeskommune) is a public elected body that is responsible for certain public administrative and service tasks within a county. Each county consists of county municipality, with the exception of Oslo, which is both a municipality and a county municipality. The main responsibility of the county municipalities are upper secondary schools, dental care, public transport, county roads, culture, cultural heritage management, land use planning and business development.

Each county municipality's main body is the county council (fylkesting), elected by direct election by all legal residents every fourth year. The county councils typically have 30-50 members and meet about six times a year. They are divided into standing committees and an executive board (fylkesutvalg), that meet considerably more often. Both the council and executive board are led by the Chairman of the County Council or County Mayor (fylkesordfører).

Some counties, including Nord-Trøndelag and Nordland, have chosen to create a county cabinet (fylkesråd) that functions as the head of the executive branch of the county municipalities duties. The cabinet is led by the Chairman of the County Cabinet (fylkesrådsleder). The head if the administration is the County Executive (fylkesrådmann).

== History ==
The predecessor of the county municipality, the Amtkommune, was established in 1837 when the municipal independence was established. Development of this institution was slow until after 1945, when development accelerated, especially in the 1970s when a number of major reforms were introduced. Before 1964, the members of the county council were appointed by the County Governor, but in 1964 the first indirect elections for the county council were held, when each municipality council was granted the right to appoint members in proportion to their number of residents. In 1976 the County Governor and county municipality were split, and the elected councils introduced, at the same time the Governor was the appointed state representative in the county, with supervisory responsibilities related to the municipalities, and other regulatory tasks.

From January 1, 2002 the hospitals and other specialist health care services provided by the county municipalities were transferred to the regional health authorities. In the period 2005-2009 there was work considering the division of tasks between the municipalities and the county municipalities, and the county municipalities and the county governors.
