= Norwegian State Railways (1883–1996) =

State-owned railways of Norway (1883–1996)

- Company type: Government agency
- Industry: Rail transport
- Founded: 1883
- Defunct: 1 December 1996
- Fate: Demerger
- Successors: Norwegian National Rail Administration; Norwegian State Railways; Norwegian Railway Inspectorate
- Headquarters: Oslo, Norway
- Area served: Norway
- Number of employees: 12,000 (1996)
- Parent: Ministry of Transport and Communications

The Norwegian State Railways (Norwegian: Norges Statsbaner or NSB) was a state-owned railway company that operated most of the railway network in Norway. The government agency/directorate was created in 1883 to oversee the construction and operation of all state-owned railways in Norway. On 1 December 1996, it was demerged to create the infrastructure operator Norwegian National Rail Administration, the train operator Norwegian State Railways and the Norwegian Railway Inspectorate. The name was taken by the train operator, although the infrastructure operator remained a government agency and is the legal successor.

== History ==
Norway's first railway, the Trunk Line, was opened in 1854. It was built and run as a private company, although with some government ownership. This was followed by two wholly state-owned railways, the narrow-gauge Hamar–Grundset Line in 1861 and the standard-gauge Kongsvinger Line in 1862, with the latter branching from the Trunk Line at Lillestrøm. Several more were built over the next two decades. In 1871 the national railway was connected to the Swedish rail infrastructure.

By the 1880s, the pace of railway construction ground to a halt due to economic and political problems. In 1883, the Norwegian State Railways was established and railway construction started up again. The Norwegian State Railways also bought up many private railways to integrate them into the national railway network. In 1920 the Bratsberg Line was acquired by the government. The Trunk Line was first formally acquired in 1926, despite having formed a central part of the network for half a century.

=== World War II ===
In January 1942, NSB gave the "green light for putting prisoners of war (POWs) to work on the construction of the Nordland Line. The POWs were forced to perform labour under conditions that were inhumane, and [Bjørn] Westlie, author of the 2015 book, Fangene som forsvant ("The Prisoners Who Disappeared"), shows that NSB was fully informed about the prisoners' situation", according to a 2015 Klassekampen article.

Of the 100,000 Soviet POWs that came to Norway, 13,000 were put to work on the Nordland Line. Over 1,000 died as a result of [the] cold, starvation and exhaustion (out of a total of 13,700 dead "foreign POWs, political prisoners and forced laborers" in Norway between 1941 and 1945).

According to Westlie, "NSB transported Jews to the outward shipping from the Oslo harbor (...) the NSB employees did not know what fate awaited the Jews. Naturally they understood that the Jews would be shipped out of the country by force, because the train went to Oslo harbor". Furthermore, Westlie points to "dilemmas [that] NSB's employees found themselves in when the NSB leadership cooperated with the Germans".

"[Bjarne] Vik was to be made the scapegoat for cooperation with the Germans," writes Westlie, even though "many of the darkest chapters are from the period before Vik" became chief, according to Halvor Hegtun.

There was no investigation of the agencies [or NSB] after the war. However, the former chief Vik was not to be prosecuted if he "did not work for NSB again".

=== After World War II ===
In 1952 a plan of electrifying operations was adopted. In 1970 the Dovre Line was electrified. In 2002 the freight operations were split to the subsidiary CargoNet, and the maintenance department became Mantena.

==== Reactions to World War II activities ====
"The transportation of Jews that were to be deported and the use of POWs on the Nordland Line is a dark chapter of NSB's history", according to kommunikasjonssjef Åge-Christoffer Lundeby in NSB in 2015. Later, Bjørn Westlie said this about the extermination of Norwegian Jews: "Who else would be more responsible than the NSB? For me, the NSB's use of POWs and the deportation of Jews must be viewed as one: namely, that the NSB thereby became an agency that participated in Hitler's violence against these two groups, who were the Nazis' main enemies. The fact that the pertinent NSB leaders received awards after the war confirms the NSB's and others' desire to conceal this".

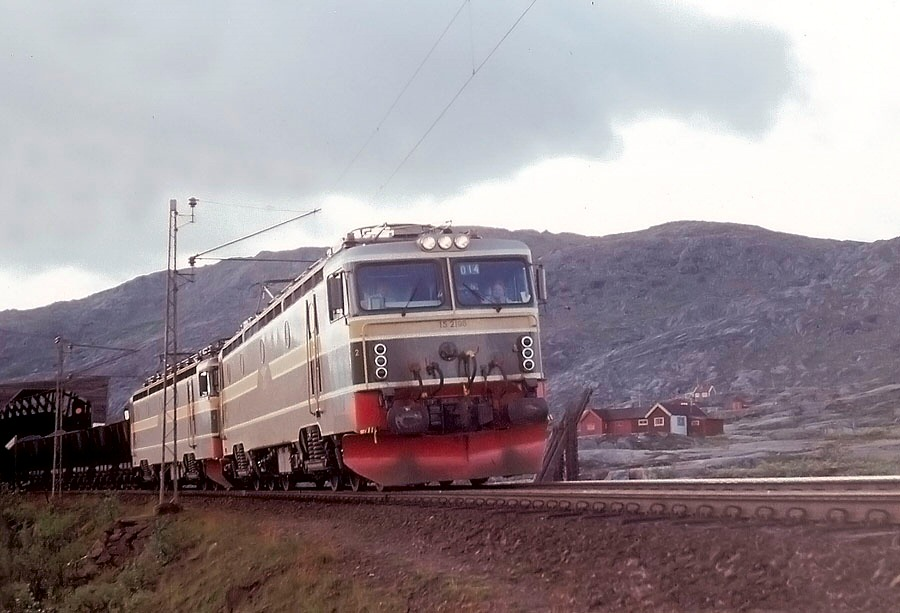
An "El 15" locomotive hauling ore on the Ofoten Line

== Directors-general ==
The title was changed from director-general to chief executive officer in the late 1980s.

- 1883–1899: Lorentz Henrik Müller Segelcke
- 1910–1912: August Fleischer (acting)
- 1912–1919: Christian Emil Stoud Platou (acting)
- 1919–1922: Theodor Holtfodt
- 1924–1938: Eivind Heiberg
- 1939–????: Waldemar Hoff
- 1944–????: Bjarne Vik (Nazi Collaborator)
- 1945–1946: Løken (acting)
- 1946–1950: Egil Sundt (acting)
- 1950–1951: Olav Holtmon (acting)
- 1951–1966: Halvdan Eyvind Stokke
- 1967–1978: Edvard Heiberg
- 1978–1988: Robert Nordén
- 1987–1988: Tore Lindholt (acting)
- 1988–1990: Kjeld Rimberg
- 1990–1990: Tore Lindholt (acting)
- 1990–1995: Kristian Rambjør
- 1995–1996: Osmund Ueland

== Preserved locomotives ==
Norwegian State railways class 21 2-6-0 No. 377 'King Haakon VII' is preserved at Bressingham Steam and Gardens.

== See also ==
- The Holocaust in Norway
