= Rogaland County Municipality =

Rogaland County Municipality Rogaland fylkeskommune
- County
- Coat of arms

- Location in Norway
- Coordinates: 58°57′54″N 05°43′04″E
- Country: Norway
- Administrative center: Stavanger

Government
  - County mayor: Marianne Chesak
- ISO 3166 code: NO-11
- Revenue: 4,738 million kr
- Employees: 3,500
- Schools: 29
- Transit authority: Kolumbus
- Website: www.rogfk.no

Rogaland County Municipality (Norwegian: Rogaland fylkeskommune) is the democratically elected regional governing administration of Rogaland county, Norway. The administration is located in the city of Stavanger.

Rogfast is a major road project that is being financed by the county municipality.

== County government ==
The county municipality's most important tasks include secondary education, recreation (sports and outdoor life), and cultural heritage. The county municipality is also responsible for all county roads (including ferry operations) and public transport (including school busses). The county municipality has further responsibility for regional land-use planning, business development, power production, and environmental management. The county also has responsibility for providing dental health services (in 2002, responsibility for hospitals and public medicine was transferred from the counties to the new regional health authorities).

=== County mayor ===
Since 1963, the county mayor (Norwegian: fylkesordfører) of Rogaland has been the political leader of the county and the chairperson of the county council. Prior to 1963, the County governor led the council which was made up of all of the mayors of the rural municipalities within the county. Here is a list of people who have held this position:

- 1964–1967: Erling Larsson (V)
- 1968–1971: Ola M. Wiig (Sp)
- 1972–1975: Herlof O. Lærdal (Sp)
- 1976–1979: Beint Bentsen (KrF)
- 1980–1983: John S. Tveit (KrF)
- 1984–1987: Lars Vaage (H)
- 1988–1991: Arne Rettedal (H)
- 1992–1999: Odd Arild Kvaløy (Sp)
- 1999–2007: Roald Bergsaker (H)
- 2007–2011: Tom Tvedt (Ap)
- 2011–2015: Janne Johnsen (H)
- 2015–2019: Solveig Ege Tengesdal (KrF)
- 2019–2023: Marianne Gudmundson (Ap)
- 2023–present: Ole Ueland (H)

=== County council ===
The county council (Norwegian: Fylkestinget) is made up of 47 representatives that are elected by direct election by all legal residents of the county every fourth year. The council is the legislative body for the county. The county council typically meets about six times a year. Council members are divided into standing committees and an executive committee (fylkesutvalg), which meet considerably more often. Both the council and executive committee (with at least 5 members) are led by the county mayor (Norwegian: fylkesordfører). The executive committee carries out the executive functions of the county under the direction of the whole council. The tables below show the current and historical composition of the council by political party.

Rogaland fylkesting 2023–2027
Party name (in Norwegian)	Number of representatives
Labour Party (Arbeiderpartiet)	10
Progress Party (Fremskrittspartiet)	7
Green Party (Miljøpartiet De Grønne)	1
Conservative Party (Høyre)	14
Industry and Business Party (Industri‑ og Næringspartiet)	3
Christian Democratic Party (Kristelig Folkeparti)	4
Red Party (Rødt)	1
Centre Party (Senterpartiet)	3
Socialist Left Party (Sosialistisk Venstreparti)	2
Liberal Party (Venstre)	2
Total number of members:	47

Rogaland fylkesting 2020–2023
Party name (in Norwegian)	Number of representatives
Labour Party (Arbeiderpartiet)	11
People's Action No to More Road Tolls (Folkeaksjonen nei til mer bompenger)	3
Progress Party (Fremskrittspartiet)	6
Green Party (Miljøpartiet De Grønne)	3
Conservative Party (Høyre)	11
Christian Democratic Party (Kristelig Folkeparti)	5
Red Party (Rødt)	1
Centre Party (Senterpartiet)	4
Socialist Left Party (Sosialistisk Venstreparti)	2
Liberal Party (Venstre)	1
Total number of members:	47

Rogaland fylkesting 2016–2019
Party name (in Norwegian)	Number of representatives
Labour Party (Arbeiderpartiet)	13
Progress Party (Fremskrittspartiet)	8
Green Party (Miljøpartiet De Grønne)	2
Conservative Party (Høyre)	12
Christian Democratic Party (Kristelig Folkeparti)	5
Centre Party (Senterpartiet)	4
Socialist Left Party (Sosialistisk Venstreparti)	1
Liberal Party (Venstre)	2
Total number of members:	47

Rogaland fylkesting 2012–2015
Party name (in Norwegian)	Number of representatives
Labour Party (Arbeiderpartiet)	13
Progress Party (Fremskrittspartiet)	8
Conservative Party (Høyre)	14
Christian Democratic Party (Kristelig Folkeparti)	5
Pensioners' Party (Pensjonistpartiet)	1
Centre Party (Senterpartiet)	3
Socialist Left Party (Sosialistisk Venstreparti)	1
Liberal Party (Venstre)	2
Total number of members:	47

Rogaland fylkesting 2008–2011
Party name (in Norwegian)	Number of representatives
Labour Party (Arbeiderpartiet)	11
Progress Party (Fremskrittspartiet)	10
Conservative Party (Høyre)	11
Christian Democratic Party (Kristelig Folkeparti)	6
Pensioners' Party (Pensjonistpartiet)	1
Centre Party (Senterpartiet)	3
Socialist Left Party (Sosialistisk Venstreparti)	2
Liberal Party (Venstre)	3
Total number of members:	47

Rogaland fylkesting 2004–2007
Party name (in Norwegian)	Number of representatives
Labour Party (Arbeiderpartiet)	9
Progress Party (Fremskrittspartiet)	11
Conservative Party (Høyre)	10
Christian Democratic Party (Kristelig Folkeparti)	6
Pensioners' Party (Pensjonistpartiet)	1
Centre Party (Senterpartiet)	4
Socialist Left Party (Sosialistisk Venstreparti)	4
Liberal Party (Venstre)	2
Total number of members:	47

Rogaland fylkesting 2000–2003
Party name (in Norwegian)	Number of representatives
Labour Party (Arbeiderpartiet)	12
Progress Party (Fremskrittspartiet)	10
Conservative Party (Høyre)	13
Christian Democratic Party (Kristelig Folkeparti)	10
Pensioners' Party (Pensjonistpartiet)	1
Red Electoral Alliance (Rød Valgallianse)	1
Centre Party (Senterpartiet)	4
Socialist Left Party (Sosialistisk Venstreparti)	3
Liberal Party (Venstre)	3
Total number of members:	57

Rogaland fylkesting 1996–1999
Party name (in Norwegian)	Number of representatives
Labour Party (Arbeiderpartiet)	17
Progress Party (Fremskrittspartiet)	10
Conservative Party (Høyre)	15
Christian Democratic Party (Kristelig Folkeparti)	11
Pensioners' Party (Pensjonistpartiet)	2
Centre Party (Senterpartiet)	9
Socialist Left Party (Sosialistisk Venstreparti)	3
Liberal Party (Venstre)	4
Total number of members:	71

Rogaland fylkesting 1992–1995
Party name (in Norwegian)	Number of representatives
Labour Party (Arbeiderpartiet)	15
Progress Party (Fremskrittspartiet)	6
Conservative Party (Høyre)	18
Christian Democratic Party (Kristelig Folkeparti)	10
Pensioners' Party (Pensjonistpartiet)	4
Centre Party (Senterpartiet)	9
Socialist Left Party (Sosialistisk Venstreparti)	6
Liberal Party (Venstre)	3
Total number of members:	71

Rogaland fylkesting 1988–1991
Party name (in Norwegian)	Number of representatives
Labour Party (Arbeiderpartiet)	19
Progress Party (Fremskrittspartiet)	10
Conservative Party (Høyre)	18
Christian Democratic Party (Kristelig Folkeparti)	11
Centre Party (Senterpartiet)	5
Socialist Left Party (Sosialistisk Venstreparti)	3
Liberal Party (Venstre)	5
Total number of members:	71

Rogaland fylkesting 1984–1987
Party name (in Norwegian)	Number of representatives
Labour Party (Arbeiderpartiet)	21
Progress Party (Fremskrittspartiet)	6
Conservative Party (Høyre)	20
Christian Democratic Party (Kristelig Folkeparti)	11
Liberal People's Party (Liberale Folkepartiet)	1
Centre Party (Senterpartiet)	6
Socialist Left Party (Sosialistisk Venstreparti)	3
Liberal Party (Venstre)	3
Total number of members:	71

Rogaland fylkesting 1980–1983
Party name (in Norwegian)	Number of representatives
Labour Party (Arbeiderpartiet)	19
Progress Party (Fremskrittspartiet)	3
Conservative Party (Høyre)	23
Christian Democratic Party (Kristelig Folkeparti)	13
Liberal People's Party (Liberale Folkepartiet)	2
Centre Party (Senterpartiet)	6
Socialist Left Party (Sosialistisk Venstreparti)	2
Liberal Party (Venstre)	3
Total number of members:	71

Rogaland fylkesting 1976–1979
Party name (in Norwegian)	Number of representatives
Labour Party (Arbeiderpartiet)	21
Anders Lange's Party (Anders Langes parti)	3
Conservative Party (Høyre)	15
Christian Democratic Party (Kristelig Folkeparti)	15
New People's Party (Nye Folkepartiet)	4
Centre Party (Senterpartiet)	8
Socialist Left Party (Sosialistisk Venstreparti)	3
Liberal Party (Venstre)	2
Total number of members:	71
