= 2009 Socialist Left Party national convention =

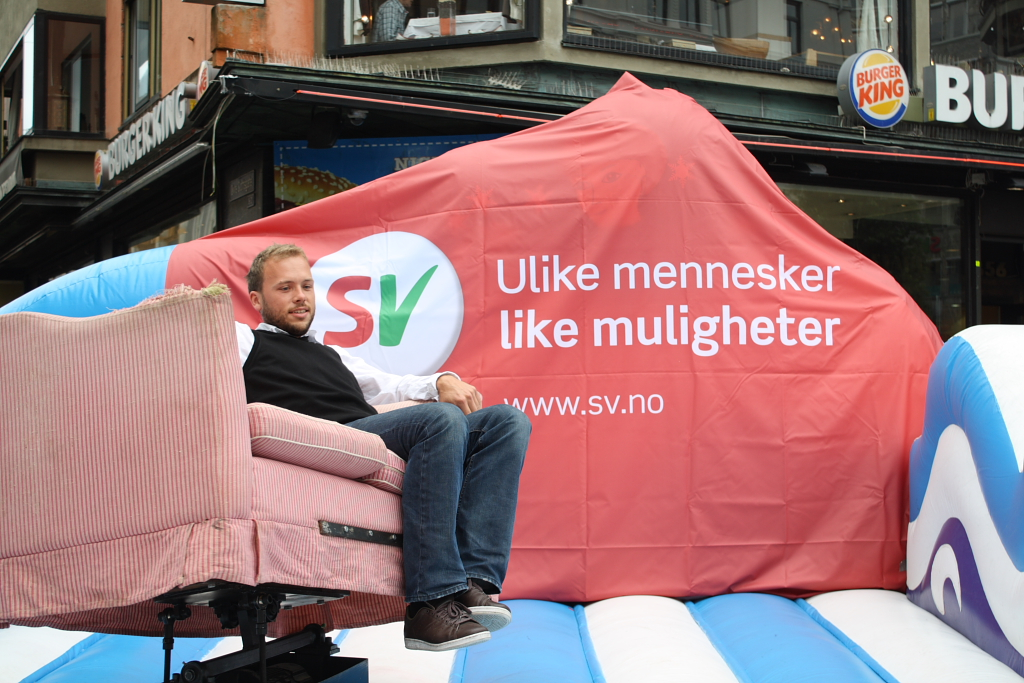
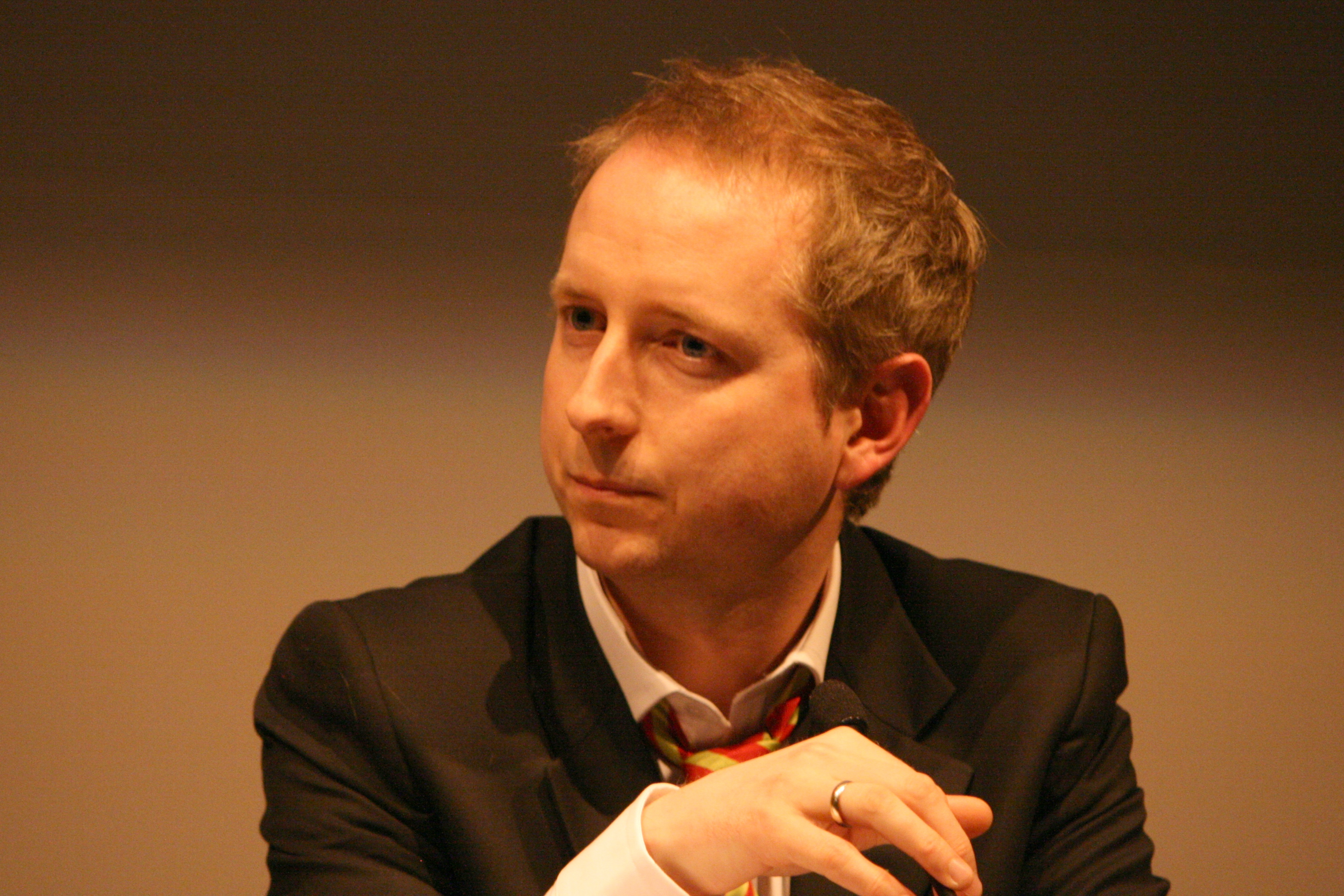
- The two newly appointed deputy leaders, (1st) Audun Lysbakken and (2nd) Bård Vegar Solhjell

Convention
- Date(s): March 19–22
- City: Bergen, Hordaland
- Venue: Scandic Bergen City Hotell; Bergen People's House

Elected leadership
- Party leader: Kristin Halvorsen
- Deputy leader(s): (1st) Audun Lysbakken (2nd) Bård Vegar Solhjell
- Party secretary: Silje Schei Tveitdal

Representatives
- Delegates: 208

The 2009 national convention of the Socialist Left Party of Norway was held from March 19–22 at the Scandic Bergen City Hotell and Bergen People's House in the city of Bergen, Hordaland. 208 delegates attended the convention.

== Background ==
By early 2009 signs showed that Kristin Halvorsen was supported by the majority of the party, even when the party was losing many ideological battles in government. Discussion on whether to leave the Red-Green Coalition was seen as dead by many news commentators, with Solhjell sharing his belief that the only viable option is to be in government so they can be a part of the decision making, saying there are no longer anyone who are scared of "minister socialism".

== Convention ==
=== 1st day ===
The convention started with a speech from Kristin Halvorsen. In the speech, she was highly critical of plans for oil drilling in Lofoten og Vesterålen, saying it would be impossible for the party to sit in a government supporting such environmental hazard policies. Her speech was criticized by some for using big words such as "market fundamentalism is playing a dangerous game" without giving clear answers. The newspaper Dagens Næringsliv noted that she skipped over topics such as nationalization, government involvement in the economy and even privatization in favour of discussing environmental issues.

=== 2nd day ===
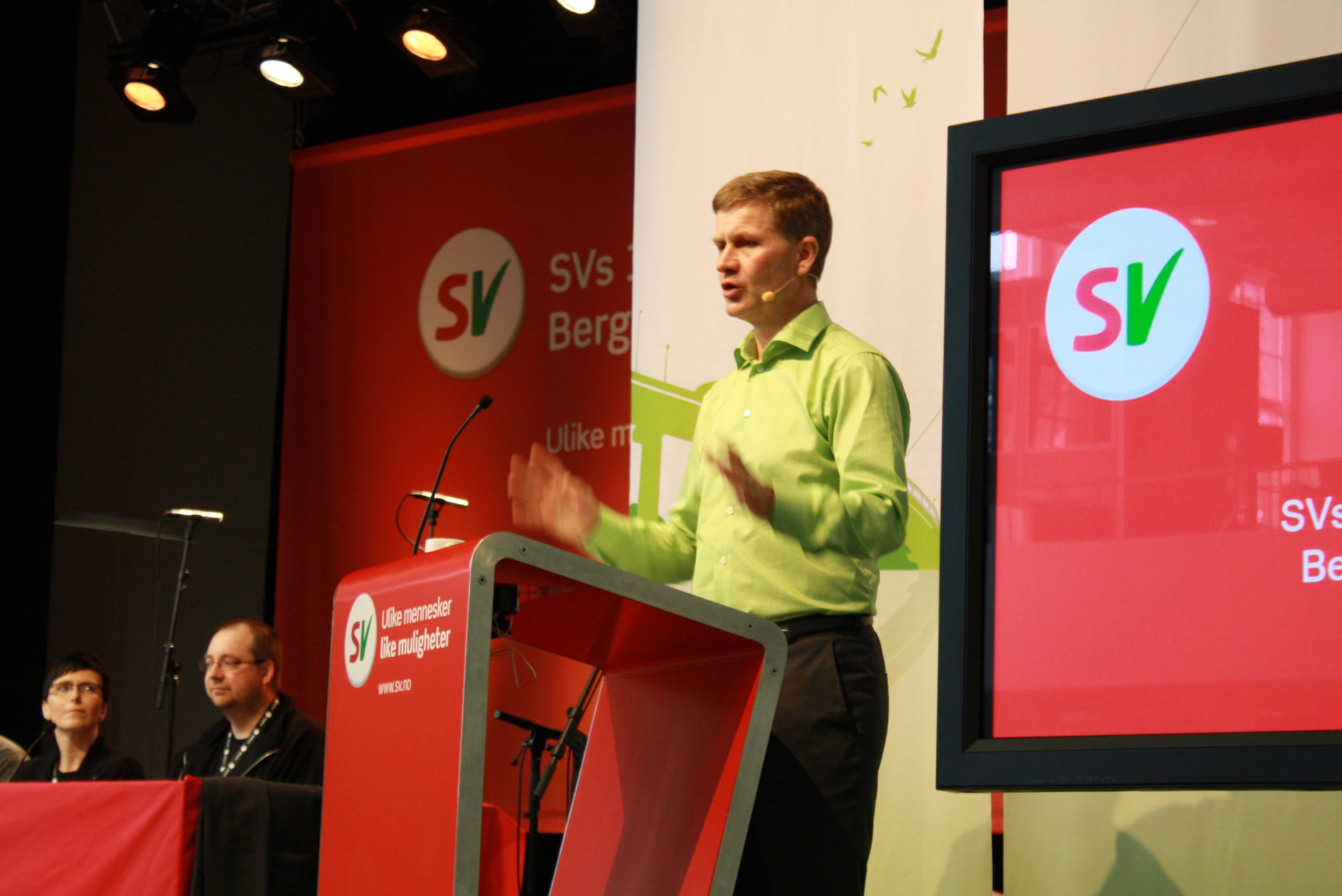
Solheim holding his speech to the convention

The second day included speeches from former party leader Erik Solheim and sitting deputy leader Audun Lysbakken. One commentator called Lysbakken's speech "sparkling" and noted increased attention when he held the speech. Among the topics he talked about was a "renaissance" of more government involvement in the economy and a future climate crisis. The new party program was described by the media as "radical" and "expansionist", however the question most asked themselves were how much of their program would be included in Soria Moria II. Lysbakken then presented his proposed new party program, which was applauded by the convention audience. Before he presented the program, he said;

This party program displays a party which is as tough as ever. It shows that we take on two tasks in Norwegian politics, that we should take on the job of achieving results in the short term and compromise, and get things for our electorate. It shows that we take two roles in Norwegian politics; that we should take on the job of achieving results in the short term and compromise, and get things done for our electorate. It shows that we should retain as a society critical party, a rebel party and a party that is not satisfied with short-term goals which will always wish to be something more. It is still us.

— Audun Lysbakken, regarding the new party program

Solheim's speech focused on technological research and development to meet the upcoming climate crisis. He controversially stated that the government should take more "political control over Statoil," so that it could move the company into a more environment friendly direction.

=== 3rd day ===
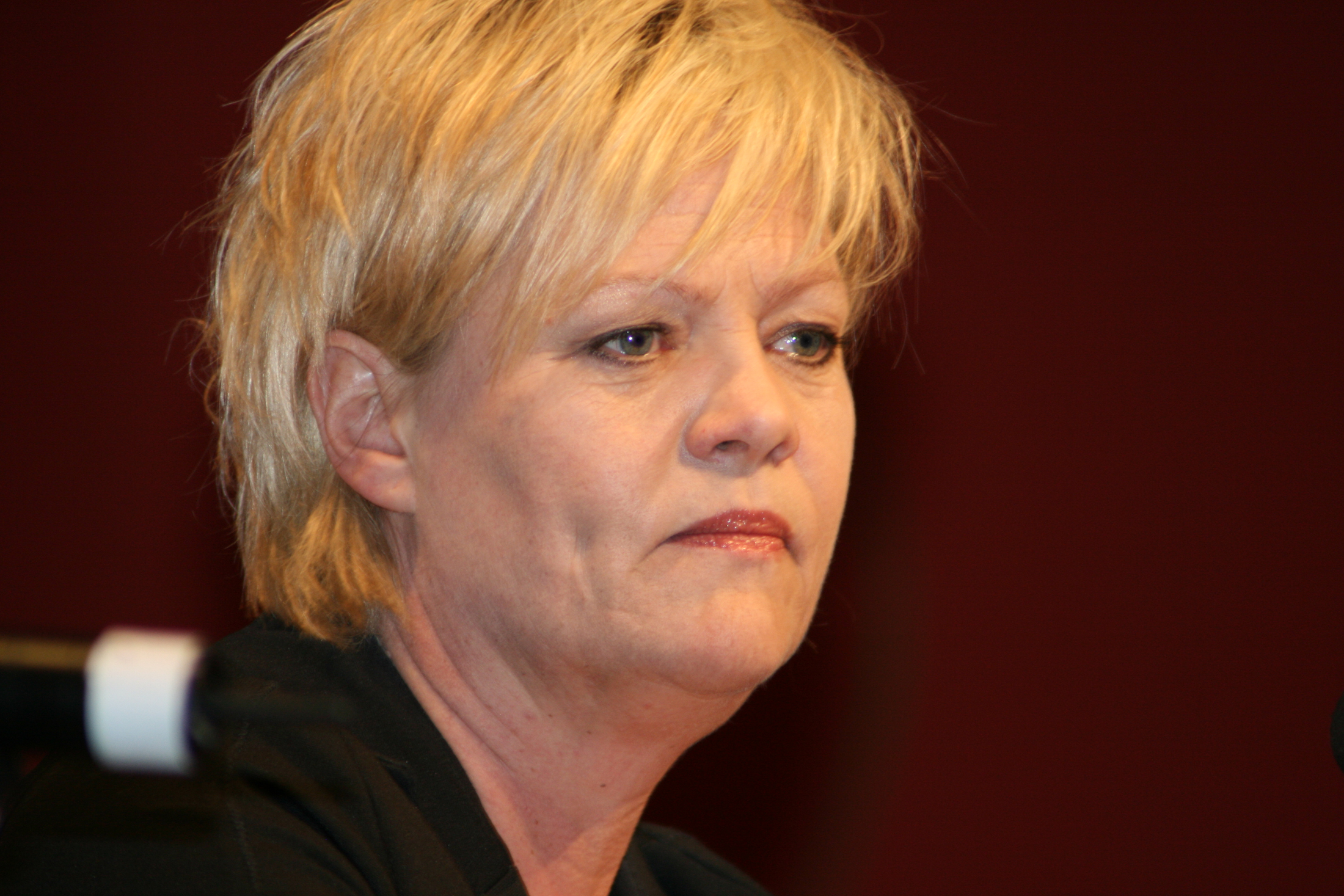
Halvorsen (as seen in 2009) was skeptical towards the clause of banning all private schools

On the third day, the convention voted to stop all public funding to religious institutions in Norway. This decision led to accusations from the Christian Democratic Party that the party was "totalitarian" and anti-religious. In response, Halvorsen argued that "The reason for the decision is a strong desire to give all children a common platform. We fear a trend in which children with the same background are on their own denominational schools. It will inhibit inclusion". Solhjell when commenting on the situation said; "The Government's current policies remain unchanged, and options should be allowed. But it should be done within the framework of public held assets". The goal, according to many high-level party members, was to abolish such religious schools within the guidelines of human rights.

Another controversial event was that the majority of the convention audience supporting a ban on all private schools in Norway. This was included in the party's program, something Halvorsen and sitting 2nd deputy leader Bård Vegar Solhjell opposed. This decision later led to fellow Socialist Left politician Stian Oen accusing Halvorsen of stopping all internal debates within the party.

Among other statements made that day, the party voted for a crisis package to level social differences and stronger regulation of financial institutions while voting against both the EU Directive and mail solicitation and a consumer boycott of Israel. The convention also made it clear that it could only participate in the governing coalition if a majority of the party's key issues were approved by their coalition partners. This idea was suggested by the party's Editorial Committee which reported this statement to the convention on the third day. This decision is seen as a tightening of the requirements needed for future collaboration with the Labour and the Centre Party.

=== 4th day ===
The convention also decided that Norwegian membership in the European Economic Area should be re-considered in a report by the Norwegian Official Report group. No to the EU leader and Socialist Left member Heming Olaussen was pleased with this decision. The control public hospitals should according to the convention be given to the local municipality authorities, and away from direct control by the government. The convention demanded immediate withdrawal of Norwegian troops in Afghanistan.

Kristin Halvorsen was re-elected to the office of party leader.

== See also ==
- Red-Green Coalition
- History of the Socialist Left Party
- List of national conventions held by the Socialist Left Party
