= 1987 Socialist Left Party national convention =

Convention
- Date(s): 3 April - 7 April
- City: Oslo

Elected leadership
- Party leader: Erik Solheim
- Deputy leader(s): (1st) Kjellbjørg Lunde (2nd) Per Eggum Mauseth
- Party secretary: Hilde Vogt

The 1987 national convention of the Socialist Left Party of Norway was held from April 3-7 in the city of Oslo. Erik Solheim was elected party leader, while Kjellbjørg Lunde and Per Eggum Mauseth were elected 1st and 2nd deputy leader respectively.

== Background ==
After it was made clear that Berge Furre would resign in 1981, newly appointed party secretary Erik Solheim used his new office to launch an attack on the left-wing section of the party. He claimed they were hurting the party by continuing many un-modern trends. He also called them conservative, believing them to have rejected too many new ideas too often. Solheim was praised by some within the party, most notably resigning party leader Furre, while criticised by left-wingers from the left-wing section of the party. Early signs showed that Tora Houg (from the left-wing faction) and Erik Solheim (from the right-wing faction) were the two most popular candidates within the party. However Houg did not see herself fit to become party leader.

== The convention ==
Creating a new party was of top-importance for Solheim supporters during the convention. The party's program from 1975 was replaced by an entirely new one, which used what Solheim described as less "dogmatic" phraseology. The renewed program was adopted without meeting much opposition. However, even if much of the phraseology had been change, Marxist theory was still the cornerstone of the party's principal program. Topics such as environmental issues, district and local politics increased in importance in the party's program. It was unanimously voted for full-day care coverage of kindergarten, which according to them was of top-importance in regional politics. Unemployment crises would be countered by building more jobs, with the majority of them coming newly built kindergarten; if they come to power. The national convention also wanted to reach the goal of making North Norway into a "green capital" of some sort.

== See also ==
- History of the Socialist Left Party
- 1997 Socialist Left Party national convention — Solheim resigns and Kristin Halvorsen takes over the office of party leader.
- List of national conventions held by the Socialist Left Party
