= List of national conventions held by the Socialist Left Party =

This is a list of national conventions held by the Socialist Left Party. The national convention works as the highest decision making organ of the party, and is held every second year.

== List of national conventions ==
#	Held	Elected leaders	Location
1st		Berit Ås	Bergen
2nd	March 4–6	—	
3rd	March 1–4	—	hotel klubben tønsberg
4th		—	
5th		Theo Koritzinsky	
6th		—	
7th	April 3–7	Erik Solheim	
8th		—	Skien, Telemark
9th		—	Hamar
10th	March 15–17	—	Oslo
11th	June 8–10	—	Ålesund
12th	May 3–5	Kristin Halvorsen	Oslo
13th	April 9–11	—	Lillehammer
14th	March 8–11	—	Hell
15th	March 6–9	—	Tromsø
16th	March 31-April 3	—	Kristiansand
17th	March 22–25	—	Gardermoen
18th	March 19–22	—	Bergen
