= 1997 Socialist Left Party national convention =

Norwegian political event

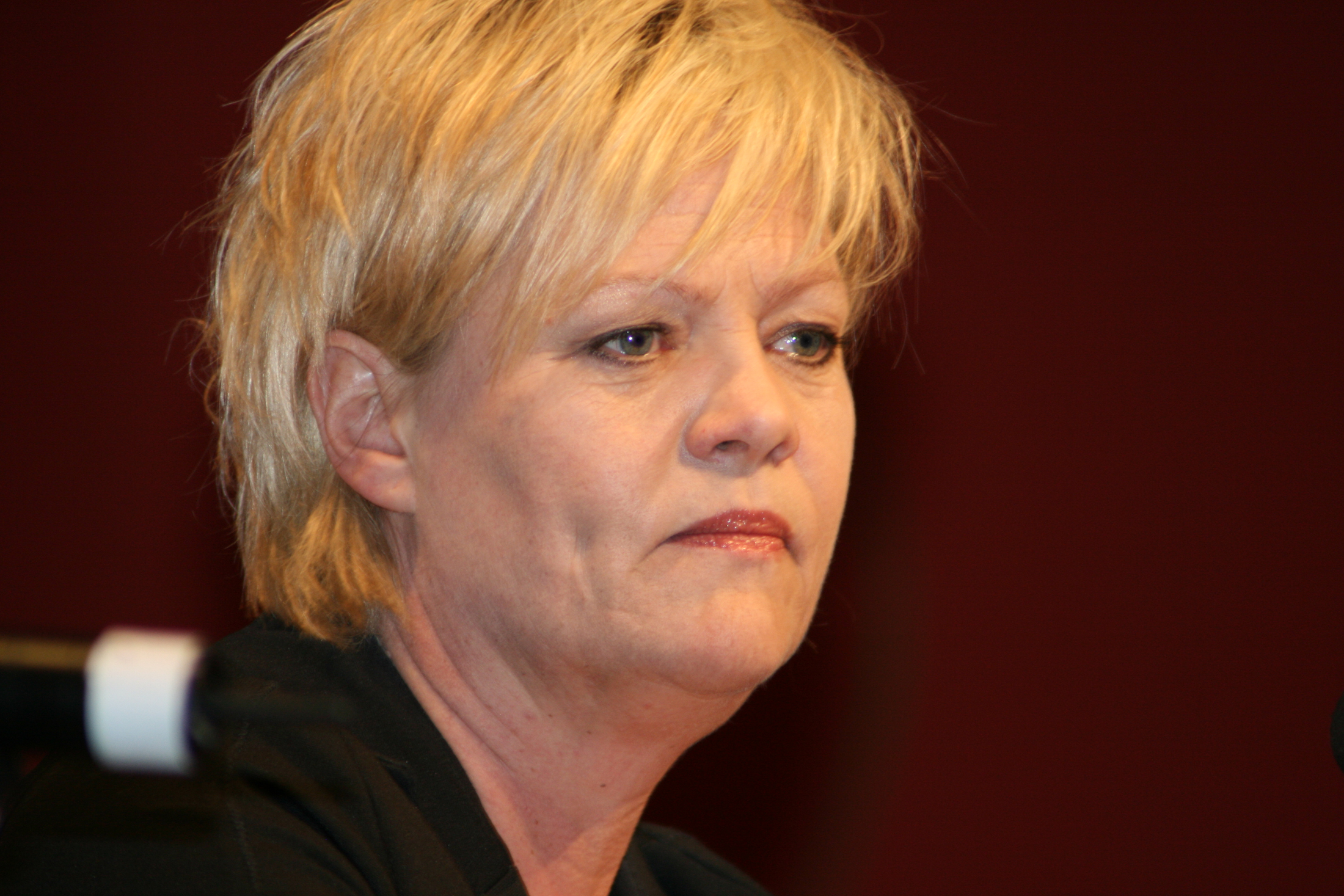
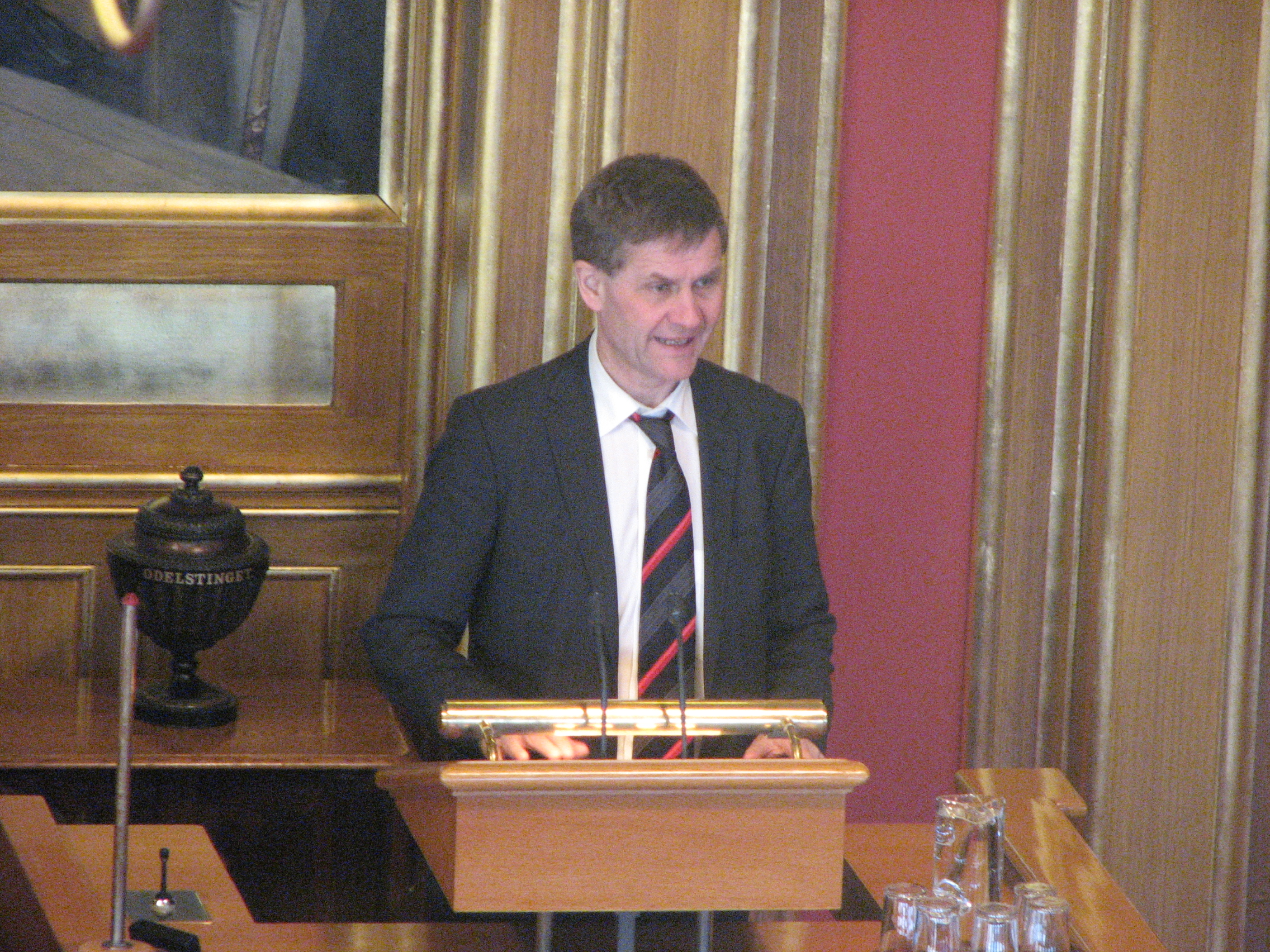
- The newly elected party leader on the left, and the resigning one the right

Convention
- Date(s): May 3–5
- City: Oslo
- Venue: People's House

Elected leadership
- Party leader: Kristin Halvorsen
- Deputy leader(s): (1st) Øystein Djupedal (2nd) Inger Lise
- Party secretary: Turid Leirvoll

The 1997 national convention was held by the Socialist Left Party was held from May 3–5 at the Oslo People's House in the city of Oslo. Erik Solheim had held the party leader seat since 1987, was forced to resign after being the main reason for the escalations in the party conflict between the left and right-wing faction. After announcing his resignation, Kristin Halvorsen became the only likely successor to him, even if she was a moderate and wanted to continue his modernization reforms within the party.

By the aftermath of the convention, the left-wing faction of the party had lost nearly all leading positions to the right-wing faction, however the party's program became radicalized and the majority of the delegates wanted a capitalist and Labour-critical stance. However, Halvorsen disobeyed some party programs clauses, the most notable being to not collaborate with capitalist or capitalist-friendly parties such as, for instance, the Labour or the Centre Party.

== Background ==
After having promised "drastic changes" to the party when holding the office of party secretary, Erik Solheim tenure as party leader saw an escalation in the conflict between the left and right-wing faction of the party. Solheim's tenure saw the crackdown of the left-wing faction; widening the gap between those on the right and left in the party. His rule also saw a wish of re-orientating the party's aim to be more open to collaborate with other parties and to be more open to inner discussion within the party. However continuing crackdowns on the left-wing faction led to intolerable power relations between the two factions.

With only one of eleven municipal party chapters saying no for the candidacy of Kristin Halvorsen. She was early on seen as the likely successor to Erik Solheim, who was forced to resign because of an escalating power struggle. However she vaguely that she had not made up her mind if she would stand for election or not. With the resignation of Solheim being seen as a must by both side to restore détente within the party. The right-wing faction however applauded Solheim's tenure. When asked how it was to be the leader of the party, Solheim replied; "it is easier to get forgiveness than permission", accusing the left-wing faction of being too conservative.

== The convention ==
=== 1st day ===
The first day was dominated by Erik Solheim and his resignation. Solheim used is time talking about what he called "future socialism", which according to him would mean more individualism and a more modern approach within the party. Kristin Halvorsen was elected new party leader that day. The Norwegian media also noted his "dominant presence" at the convention could be a sign of the party's complicated relations with him; because of his more reformist stance on multiple subjects. Then sitting Prime Minister of Norway Thorbjørn Jagland believed that the leader change within the party would not change the Socialist Left's relationship with the Labour Party's. Believing that both Solheim and Halvorsen held the same beliefs, even if Solheim was more of a "theoretician" then a "practician" as Halvorsen was. Hans Ebbing left the party's Central Board in protest of the election of Halvorsen, sharing the same belief as Jagland that she would continuing in reforming the party and moving away from traditional socialist beliefs. This incident was seen as "childish" by both the right-wing faction of the party and the media.

=== 2nd and 3rd day ===
While the left-wingers lost most of the leading party positions to the right-wing faction, most right-wing stances were kept out of the party's new program. It was voted if the party still should fight against Norwegian membership in NATO and the WTO, the majority of the party voted against NATO and the WTO. This was seen as a victory for the left-wingers of the party. Another problem facing the right-wingers was that the majority of the delegates voted for a more critical stance against capitalism and the Norwegian Labour Party; which was voted a "tactical enemy" against the Socialist Left, and stressed the importance that the party could not collaborate with either the Labour or the Centre Party. This no to collaboration with other parties made it clear that most members were not interested in further continuing with the modernisation program started by Solheim. However Halvorsen did not share the same belief or principals which were ratified by the national convention, seeing that she came from the moderate faction of the party. She would later disobey the national convention saying she and the party would be open to a government coalition with the Labour and the Centre Party.

== See also ==
- Red-Green Coalition
- History of the Socialist Left Party
- 1994 Progress Party national convention — another famous convention, where the Progress Party split into several minor groups.
- List of national conventions held by the Socialist Left Party
