= 1989 Norwegian parliamentary election =

- 10 and 11 September 1989

All 165 seats in the Storting 83 seats needed for a majority
- Registered: 3,190,311
- Turnout: 83.16% (▼0.87 pp)
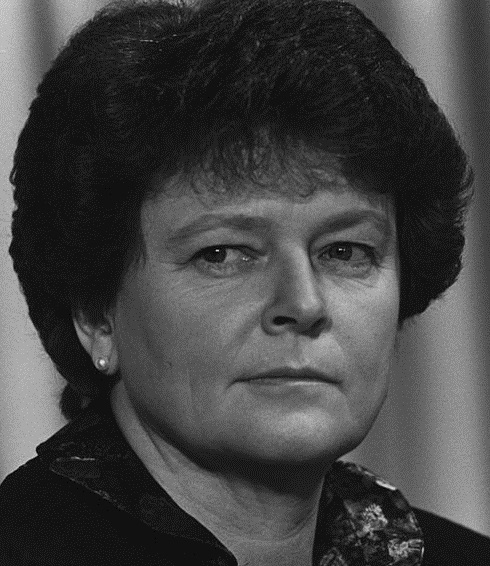

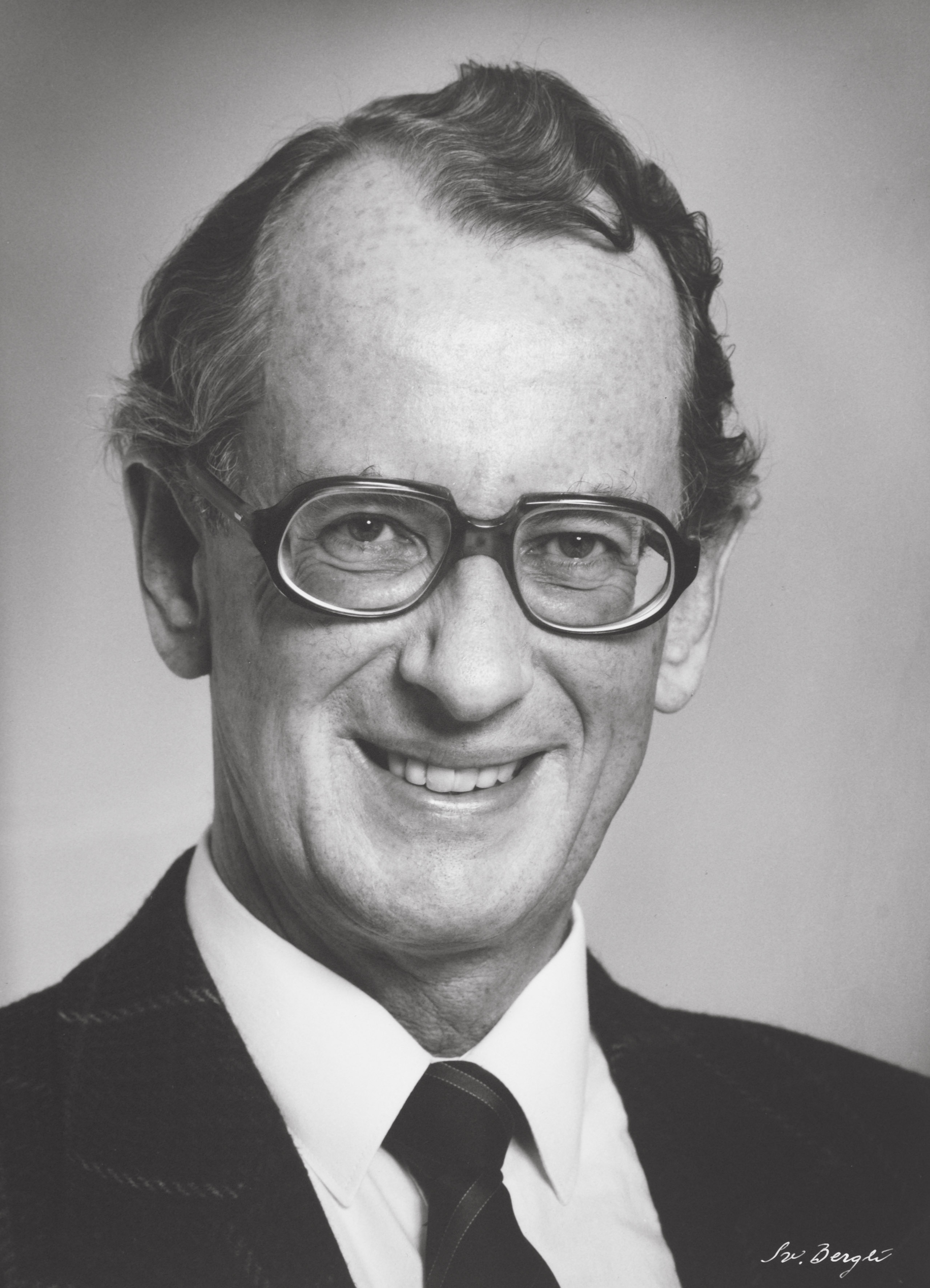

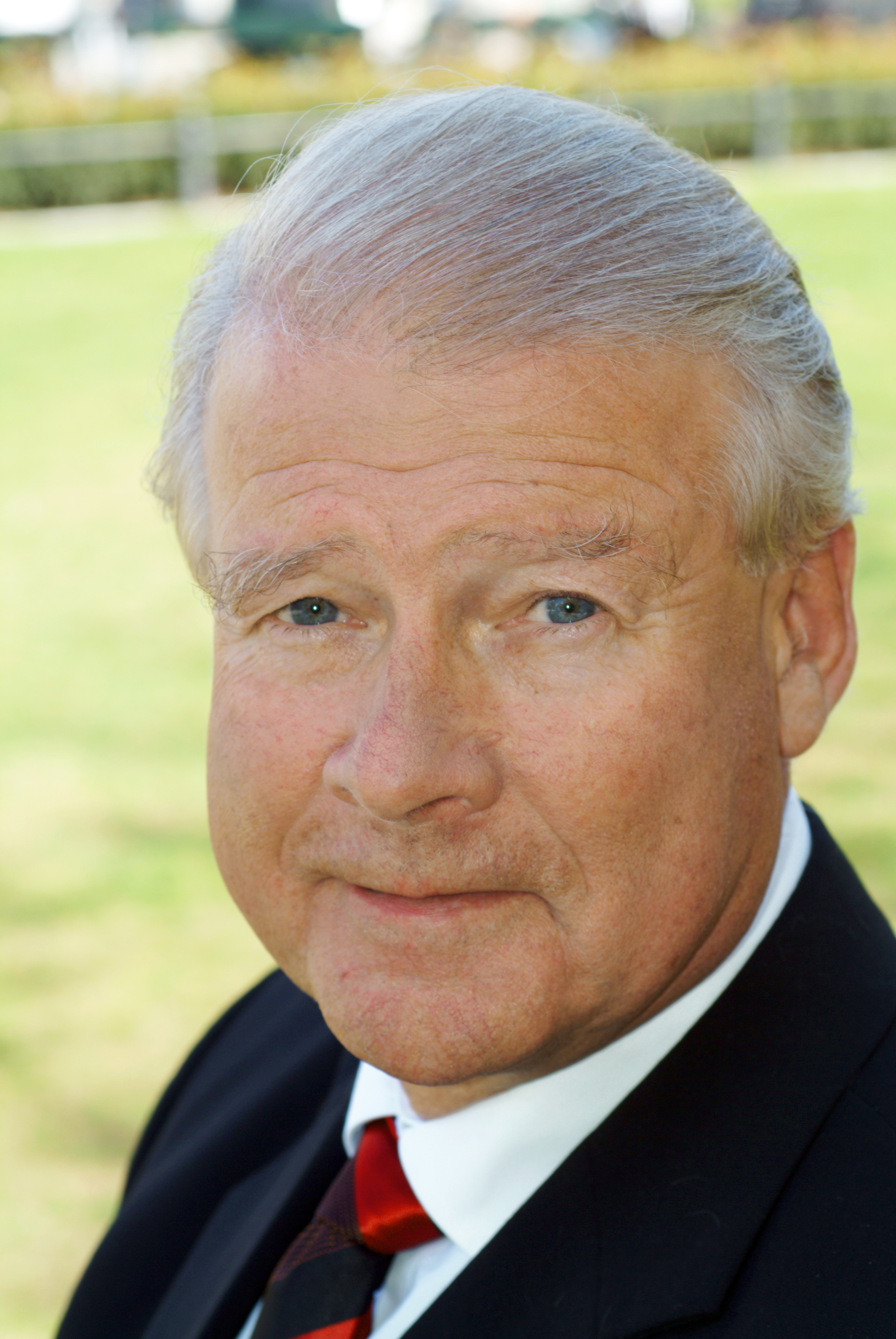

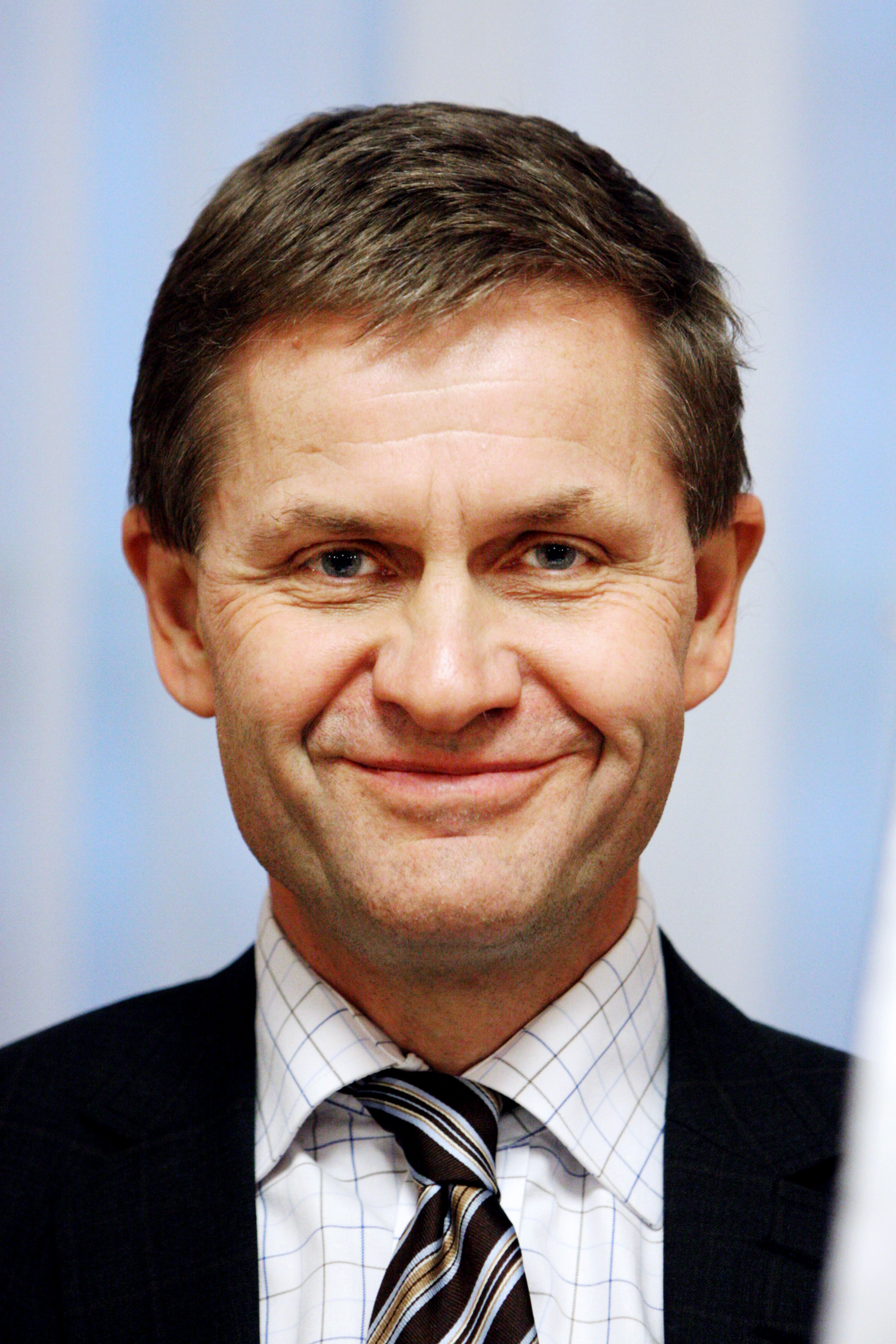

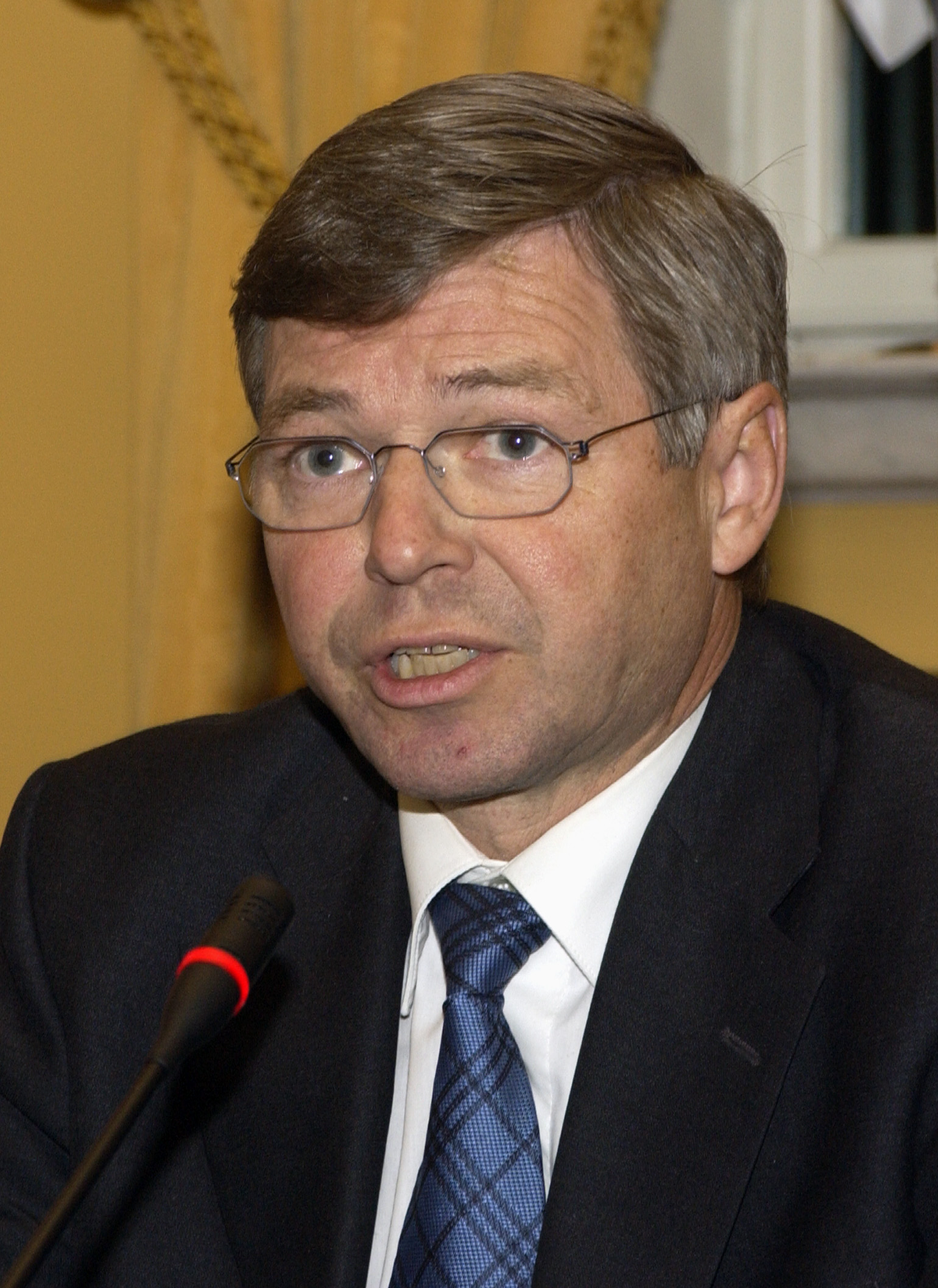

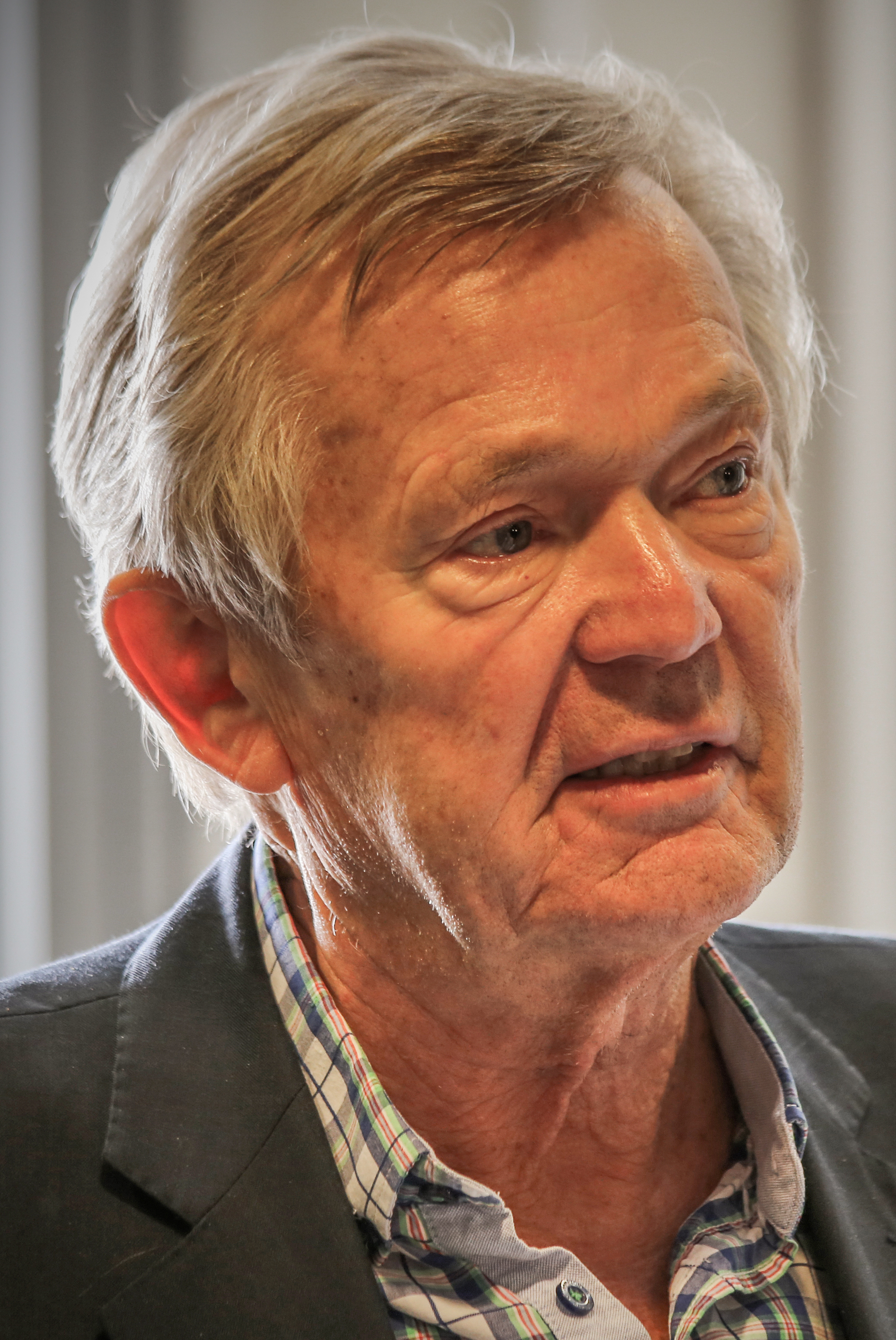

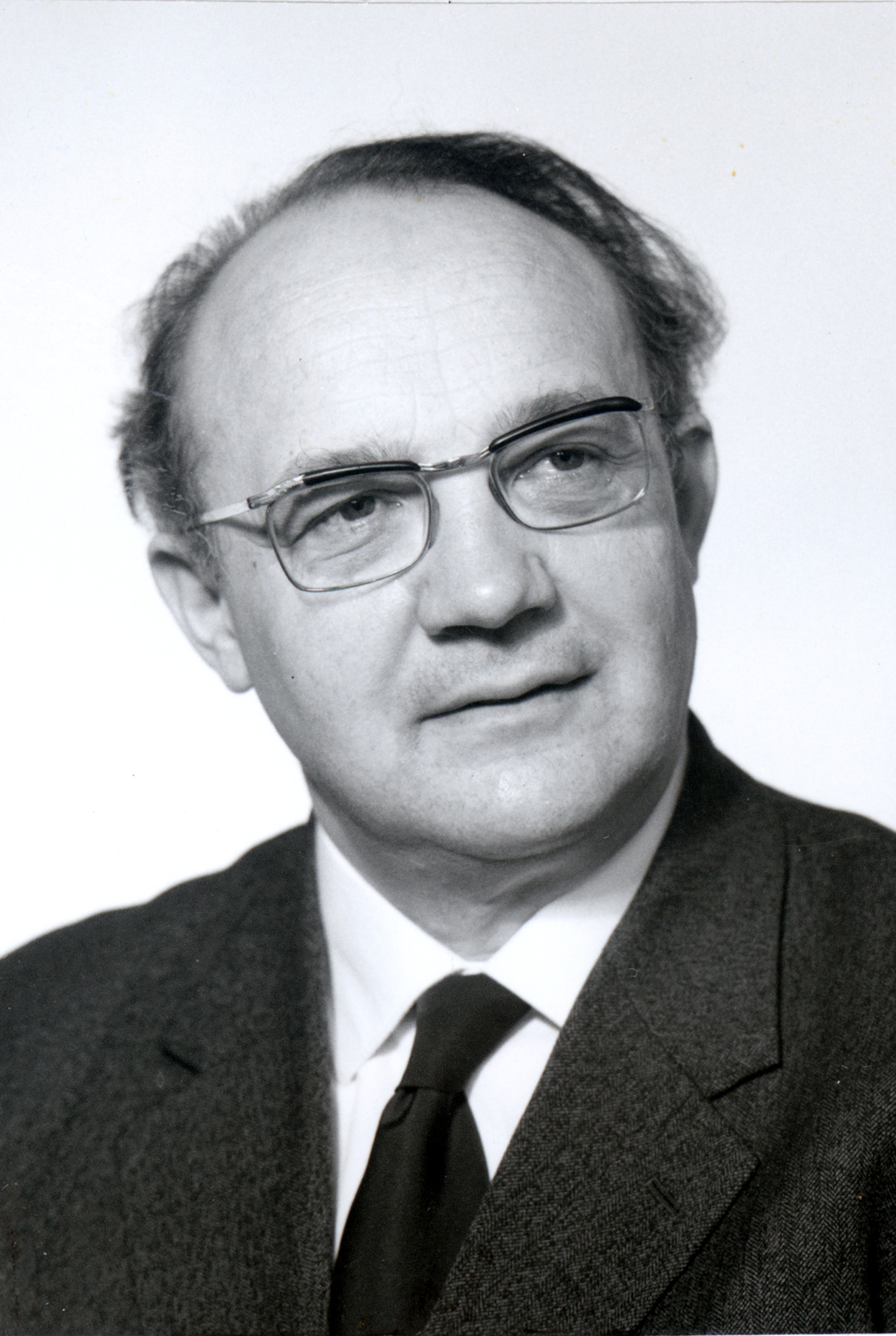
	First party	Second party	Third party
Leader	Gro Harlem Brundtland	Jan P. Syse	Carl I. Hagen
Party	Labour	Conservative	Progress
Last election	40.81%, 71 seats	30.42%, 50 seats	3.72%, 2 seats
Seats won	63	37	22
Seat change	▼8	▼13	▲20
Popular vote	907,393	588,682	345,185
Percentage	34.27%	22.23%	13.04%
Swing	▼6.54 pp	▼8.19 pp	▲9.32 pp
	Fourth party	Fifth party	Sixth party
Leader	Erik Solheim	Kjell Magne Bondevik	Johan J. Jakobsen
Party	Socialist Left	Christian; Democratic	Centre
Last election	5.46%, 6 seats	8.26%, 16 seats	6.60%, 12 seats
Seats won	17	14	11
Seat change	▲11	▼2	▼1
Popular vote	266,782	224,852	171,269
Percentage	10.08%	8.49%	6.47%
Swing	▲4.62 pp	▲0.23 pp	▼0.13 pp
	Seventh party
Leader	Anders John Aune
Party	Future for Finnmark
Last election	–
Seats won	1
Seat change	New
Popular vote	8,817
Percentage	0.33%
- Largest bloc and seats won by constituency
Prime Minister before election
Gro Harlem Brundtland
Labour
Prime Minister after election
Jan P. Syse
Conservative

Parliamentary elections were held in Norway on 10 and 11 September 1989. The Labour Party remained the largest party in the Storting, winning 63 of the 165 seats.

The non-socialist parties gained a majority, and Jan P. Syse became prime minister of a coalition minority cabinet consisting of the Conservative Party, the Christian Democratic Party, and the Centre Party. This cabinet was disbanded a year later after the Centre Party broke with the Conservatives over the Norwegian EU membership issue. Gro Harlem Brundtland became prime minister in 1990, forming a minority Labour government until the 1993 election four years later.

== Political parties ==
Name		Ideology	Position	Leader	1985 result	
Name		Ideology	Position	Leader	Votes (%)	Seats
Ap	Labour Party; Arbeiderpartiet	Social democracy	Centre-left	Gro Harlem Brundtland	40.8%	71 / 167
H	Conservative Party; Høyre	Conservatism; Factions:Valueconservativism	Centre-right	Jan P. Syse	30.4%	50 / 167
KrF	Christian Democratic Party; Kristelig Folkeparti	Christian democracy	Centre to centre-right	Kjell Magne Bondevik	8.2%	16 / 167
Sp	Centre Party; Senterpartiet	Agrarianism	Centre	Johan J. Jakobsen	6.6%	12 / 167
SV	Socialist Left Party; Sosialistisk Venstreparti	Democratic socialism	Left-wing	Erik Solheim	5.4%	6 / 167
FrP	Progress Party; Fremskrittspartiet	Classical liberalism	Right-wing	Carl I. Hagen	3.7%	2 / 167
V	Liberal Party; Venstre	Social liberalism	Centre	Arne Fjørtoft	3.1%	0 / 167

== Campaign ==
=== Slogans ===
Party	Original slogan	English translation
Labour Party	«Ny vekst for Norge»	«New growth for Norway»
Conservative Party		
Centre Party		
Christian Democratic Party	«La livet leve»	«Let life live»
Liberal Party		
Progress Party	«Vi vil gjøre noe med det!»	«We want to do something about it!»

=== Debates ===
1989 Norwegian general election debates
Date	Organiser	P Present I Invitee N Non-invitee									
Date	Organiser	Ap	H	KrF	Sp	Sv	Frp	V	Ms	Mdg	Refs
21 August 1989	NRK	P Gro Harlem Brundtland	N Jan P. Syse	N Kjell Magne Bondevik	N Johan J. Jakobsen	N Erik Solheim	P Carl I. Hagen	N Arne Fjørtoft	N Einar Edvardsen	N Birte Simonsen	
31 August 1989	NRK	N Gro Harlem Brundtland	N Jan P. Syse	P Kjell Magne Bondevik	N Johan J. Jakobsen	N Erik Solheim	P Carl I. Hagen	N Arne Fjørtoft	N Einar Edvardsen	N Birte Simonsen	
6 September 1989	NRK	P Gro Harlem Brundtland	P Jan P. Syse	N Kjell Magne Bondevik	N Johan J. Jakobsen	N Erik Solheim	N Carl I. Hagen	N Arne Fjørtoft	N Einar Edvardsen	N Birte Simonsen	
8 September 1989	NRK	P Gunnar Berge, Gro Harlem Brundtland	P Jan P. Syse	P Kjell Magne Bondevik	P Johan J. Jakobsen	P Erik Solheim	P Carl I. Hagen	P Arne Fjørtoft	P Einar Edvardsen	P Birte Simonsen	

== Results ==
Party	Votes	%	Seats	+/–
Labour Party	907,393	34.27	63	–8
Conservative Party	588,682	22.23	37	–13
Progress Party	345,185	13.04	22	+20
Socialist Left Party	266,782	10.08	17	+11
Christian Democratic Party	224,852	8.49	14	–2
Centre Party	171,269	6.47	11	–1
Liberal Party	84,740	3.20	0	0
County Lists for Environment and Solidarity	22,139	0.84	0	New
Environment Party The Greens	10,136	0.38	0	New
Stop the Immigration	8,963	0.34	0	New
Future for Finnmark	8,817	0.33	1	New
Pensioners' Party	7,863	0.30	0	0
Liberals – Europe Party	470	0.02	0	New
Common Future	313	0.01	0	New
Total	2,647,604	100.00	165	+8
Valid votes	2,647,604	99.79		
Invalid/blank votes	5,569	0.21		
Total votes	2,653,173	100.00		
Registered voters/turnout	3,190,311	83.16		
Source: Nohlen & Stöver

=== Voter demographics ===
Cohort	Percentage of cohort voting for							
Cohort	Ap	H	FrP	Sv	KrF	Sp	V	Others
Total vote	34.27%	22.23%	13.04%	10.08%	8.49%	6.47%	3.20%	
Gender
Females	35.1%	22.2%	9.9%	11.6%	9.7%	6.6%	2.6%	
Males	33.4%	22.2%	16.1%	8.6%	7.3%	6.3%	3.8%	
Age
18–30 years old	24.1%	26.1%	21.4%	12.9%	4.2%	4.2%	4%	
30-59 years old	36%	22%	10.2%	11.4%	7.3%	7.2%	3.3%	
60 years old and older	41.5%	18.4%	10.4%	3.5%	16.2%	7.2%	2%	
Work
low income	35%	17.5%	16.6%	9.5%	10.1%	5.3%	2.7%	
Average income	36.9%	18%	13.9%	10.7%	8.9%	7.4%	2.7%	
High income	28.1%	34.7%	9.1%	10.4%	5.5%	4.2%	4.9%	
Education
Primary school	52.6%	11.4%	11.2%	6.2%	8.7%	6.8%	1.4%	
High school	33%	21.6%	15.6%	9.6%	7.5%	7.7%	3%	
University/college	14.8%	37.3%	8.1%	16.4%	10.9%	2.5%	6.1%	
Source: Norwegian Institute for Social Research

=== Seat distribution ===
Constituency	Total seats	Seats won						
Constituency	Total seats	Ap	H	Frp	SV	KrF	Sp	FfF
Akershus	15	4	5	3	2		1	
Aust-Agder	4	1	1	1		1		
Buskerud	7	4	2	1				
Finnmark	4	2			1			1
Hedmark	8	5	1		1		1	
Hordaland	16	5	4	3	1	2	1	
Møre og Romsdal	10	3	2	1	1	2	1	
Nord-Trøndelag	6	3	1		1		1	
Nordland	12	5	2	1	2	1	1	
Oppland	7	4	1	1			1	
Oslo	16	5	5	3	2	1		
Østfold	9	3	2	1	1	1	1	
Rogaland	12	3	3	2	1	2	1	
Sogn og Fjordane	5	2	1			1	1	
Sør-Trøndelag	10	4	2	1	1	1	1	
Telemark	6	2	1	1	1	1		
Troms	6	3	1	1	1			
Vest-Agder	5	2	1	1		1		
Vestfold	7	3	2	1	1			
Total	165	63	37	22	17	14	11	1
Source: Norges Offisielle Statistikk
