= Thor Heyerdahl Climate Park =

Climate park in Ayeyarwady Region, Myanmar

Coordinates: 17°04′03″N 94°28′06″E

Thor Heyerdahl Climate Park is an 1,800-acre climate park located in Ayeyarwady Region of Myanmar. The park is situated at the delta region of Irrawaddy River at the edge of the Bay of Bengal. The park was named after the Norwegian adventurer and ethnographer, Thor Heyerdahl. It was initiated following the research on mangrove restoration by the Worldview International Foundation (WIF) in 2012 in association with Pathein University, Myeik University and Ministry of Environmental Conservation and Forestry, Myanmar. The park is designed for mangrove restoration in Myanmar to overcome losses of 1 million Hectares since 1980.

== Overview ==
Thor Heyerdahl Climate Park was started in 2012 by Arne Fjørtoft and Ministry of Environmental Conservation and Forestry, Myanmar as a pilot project for large scale mangrove restoration worldwide based on three years research by WIF in co-operation with Pathein University and Myeik University. The park is planned to plant nearly 9 million mangrove trees in three yearly stages between 2015 and 2018. From January 2015 to July 2015, over 400,000 mangrove trees have been planted in the park and 100,000 in the nursery for planting at later stages in 2015. During this period, additional land has been cleared for planting of 1 million mangrove trees in 2016. This will complete planting in 2016 of 2 million trees in the park, with a capacity to mitigate 2 million tons of CO_{2} climate gases during 20 years growth period of the trees. During 2017 and 2018, the park planted the remaining 6 million trees. The project has been supported by Intercultural Open University Foundation, Letten Foundation and other institutions, companies and private individuals.

=== Tanintharyi Region ===
An invitation to plant on 5,000 acres around Myeik area in Tanintharyi Region is in planning stage of Ministry of Environmental Conservation and Forestry, which is scheduled for a possible start in 2016, with a capacity to mitigate 6 million tons CO_{2}.
