= Liss Schanche =

Norwegian politician

Secretary of the Socialist Left Party
- In office 1979–1981
- Preceded by: Lasse Jahnsen
- Succeeded by: Erik Solheim

Personal details
- Party: Socialist Left Party

Liss Schanche is a Norwegian politician who was Party Secretary of the Socialist Left Party from 1979 to 1981.
