= Future for Finnmark =

Defunct political party in Norway

People's Action Future for Finnmark Folkeaksjonen Framtid for Finnmark
- Leader: Vidar Karlstad
- Founded: March 1989
- Ideology: Social democracy; Regionalism

People's Action Future for Finnmark (Norwegian: Folkeaksjonen Framtid for Finnmark), also popularly called the Aune List (Aunelista), was a Norwegian political party which ran for the 1989 parliamentary election as a protest party against the more established parties of the country. It was headed by Anders John Aune, who succeeded in winning a seat for Finnmark.

== History ==
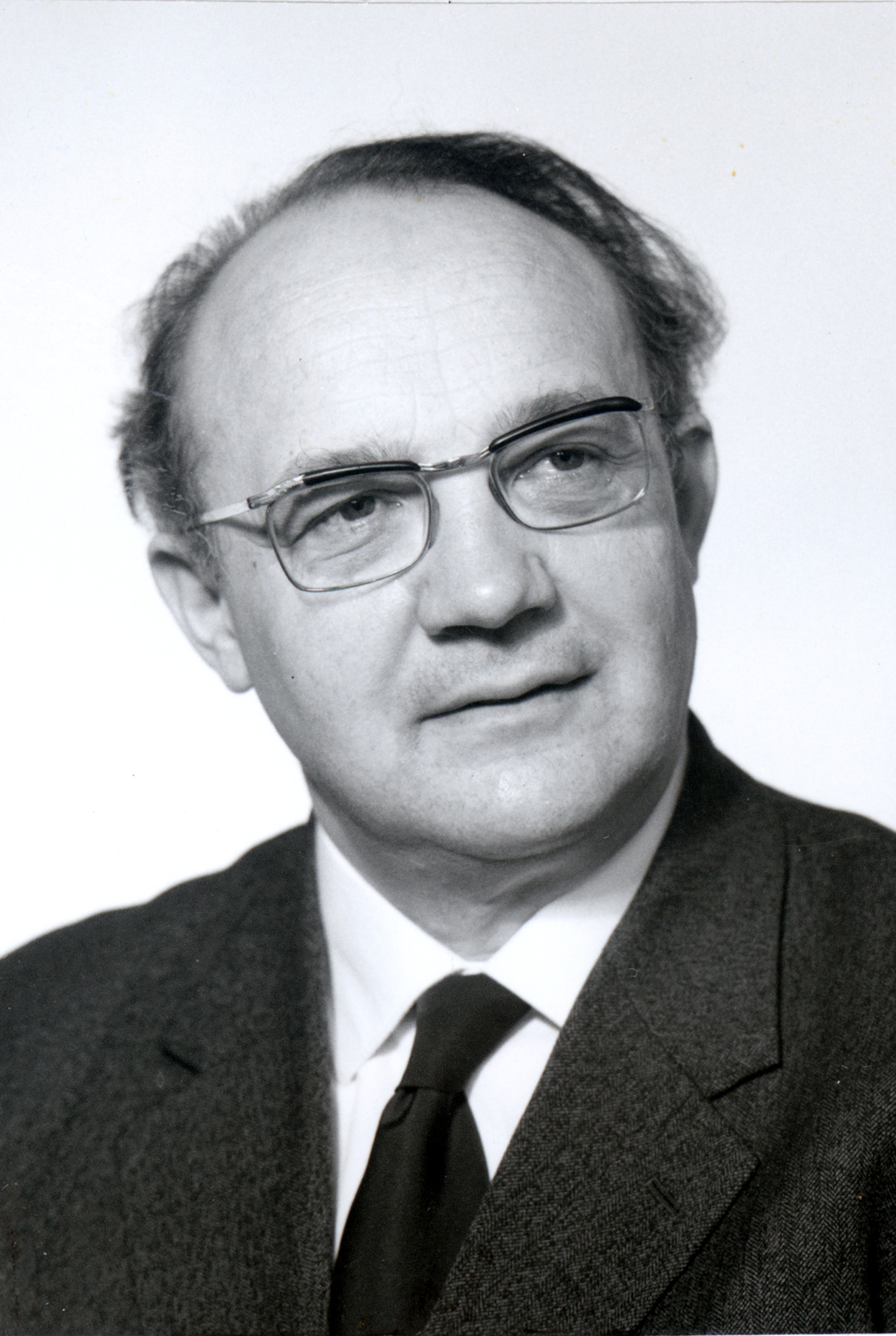
Anders Aune

The action was started in March 1989; within three weeks of its formation, approximately 4,000 people had joined it as members. It received members from parties ranging as wide as from the Red Electoral Alliance to the Progress Party. The action was originally headed by Vidar Karlstad, but was immediately also supported by Anders John Aune, a former Member of Parliament for the Labour Party (1969–73) and was at the time County Governor of Finnmark since 1976. On 1 May 1989, Aune finally decided to run with the party for the 1989 election. By June 1989, the party had almost 7,000 members.

Among the issues for the party was a reduction of taxes in order to improve the conditions of the county which was haunted by poor fishing outputs and people moving out. After Prime Minister Gro Harlem Brundtland had visited the county the previous year, Karlstad stated that "it is incomprehensible for us that the Prime Minister of the country travels all over the world teaching other nations on how to govern themselves, while our county lay as a forgotten colony which people escape from".

Aune had left the Labour Party in protest against what he regarded as Brundtland's Second Cabinet's passivity regarding migration from Finnmark to the rest of the country, as well as the crisis in the fishing industry. At the time he accepted the nomination, he did not expect to elected to Parliament. In the 1989 election, the party proved to be quite successful, receiving 21.5% of the votes in the county of Finnmark and becoming the second-largest party. This gave the party one representative in the Norwegian Parliament, of which its leader Anders John Aune served for a four-year term.

In Parliament, Aune was rapporteur for the work leading to the establishment of the Action Zone in Finnmark and Northern Troms in 1990. He was also decisive in the introduction of the "Finnmark Package" which resulted in reduce income tax for residents in Finnmark in the state budget in 1993. With this, the party believed they had achieved their goals. During his tenure in Parliament, Aune had two secretaries, both with their background from the Liberal Party: Erling Moe and Reinert Leirvik.

One of the key people behind Future For Finnmark, Håkon Schulstad, returned to the Labour Party in 1990. Vidar Karlstad became involved in the creation of a new political party, the Common Future, based on the People's Action and other local lists. However, he himself returned to the Conservative Party the same year.
