= Edle Daasvand =

Norwegian politician (born 1969)

Secretary of the Socialist Left Party
- In office 2005–2009
- Preceded by: Bård Vegar Solhjell
- Succeeded by: Silje Schei Tveitdal

Personal details
- Born: 23 December 1969 (age 55) Stavanger, Norway
- Party: Socialist Left Party

Edle Daasvand (born 23 December 1969, in Stavanger) is a Norwegian who was Party Secretary of the Socialist Left Party from 2005 to 2009.
