= Lasse Jahnsen =

Norwegian politician

Secretary of the Socialist Left Party
- In office 1977–1979
- Preceded by: Rune Fredh
- Succeeded by: Liss Schanche

Personal details
- Born: 1950
- Political party: Socialist Left Party

Lasse Jahnsen (born 1950) is a Norwegian politician who was Party Secretary of the Socialist Left Party from 1977 to 1979.
