= Silje Schei Tveitdal =

Norwegian politician

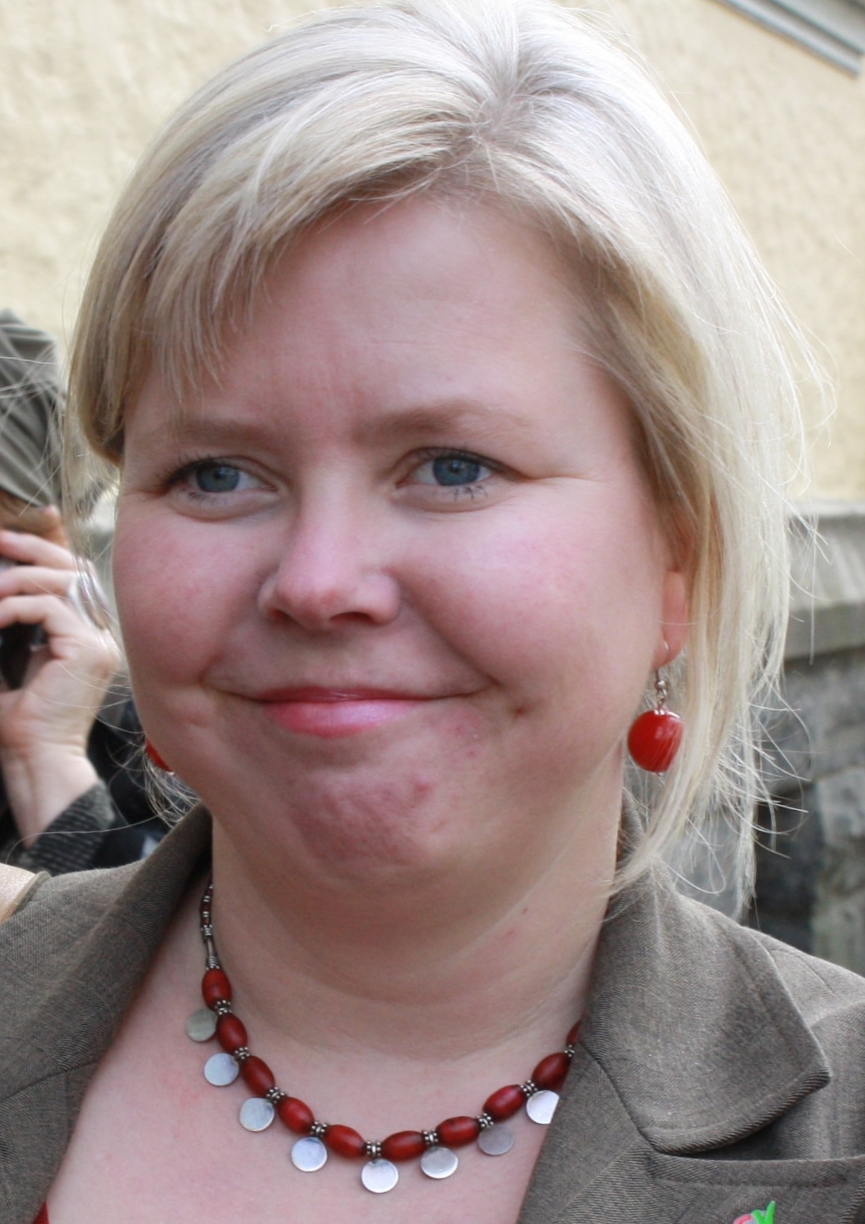
- Silje Schei Tveitdal in 2009

Secretary of the Socialist Left Party
- In office 2009 – 14 March 2015
- Leader: Kristin Halvorsen; Audun Lysbakken
- Preceded by: Edle Daasvand
- Succeeded by: Kari Elisabeth Kaski

Personal details
- Born: 24 April 1974 (age 50); Norway
- Political party: Socialist Left
- Spouse: Lars Haltbrekken

Silje Schei Tveitdal (born 24 April 1974) is a Norwegian environmentalist and politician for the Socialist Left Party. She served as the party secretary from 2009 to 2015.

== Biography ==
Silje Schei Tveitdal was the leader of Natur og Ungdom in 1997 and 1998. Before being leader she had been deputy leader since 1994. After leaving Natur og Ungdom she studied social economics at the University of Oslo and is advisor for the Socialist Left Party member in Standing Committee on Energy and the Environment in the Norwegian legislature. She was also chairperson of Zero Emission Resource Organisation (ZERO) from its start in 2002. In 2009 she succeeded Edle Daasvand as party secretary of the Socialist Left Party.

She is married to Lars Haltbrekken.

Non-profit organization positions
| Preceded by Lars Haltbrekken | Leader of Nature and Youth; 1997–1998 | Succeeded by Einar Håndlykken |
Party political offices
| Preceded by Edle Daasvand | Party secretary of the Socialist Left Party; 2009–2015 | Succeeded by Kari Elisabeth Kaski |
