= Bente Sandvig =

Norwegian politician

Secretary of the Socialist Left Party
- In office 1989–1993
- Preceded by: Hilde Vogt
- Succeeded by: Turid Leirvoll

Personal details
- Born: 1956
- Political party: Socialist Left Party

Bente Sandvig (born 1956) is a Norwegian politician who was party secretary of the Socialist Left Party from 1989 to 1993. She is from 1993 employed in Norwegian Humanist Association and leader of the Council for Religious and Life Stance Communities from 2007 to 2011.
