= Rune Fredh =

Norwegian politician (1945–2006)

Secretary of the Socialist Left Party
- In office 1975–1977
- Preceded by: Office created
- Succeeded by: Lasse Jahnsen

Organizational Secretary of the Socialist Electoral League
- In office 1973–1975
- Preceded by: Office created
- Succeeded by: Office abolished

Personal details
- Born: 23 September 1945 Borge, Østfold, Norway
- Died: 12 August 2006 (aged 60) Fredrikstad, Østfold, Norway
- Party: Socialist Left Party; Communist Party
- Occupation: Farmer

Rune Fredh (12 July 1945 – 23 August 2006) was a Norwegian politician who was Party Secretary of the Socialist Electoral League and later the Socialist Left Party from 1973–1977.

== Early life and career ==
Fredh was born on 23 September 1945 in Borge, Østfold. He started his political career as a member of the communist party youth wing. He later became chairman of the Labour Party of the Communist Party and became a member of the Bergen City Council.

He later became a member of the Communist Party and when the party participated in the Socialist Electoral League, he was elected Organizational Secretary of the coalition in the national convention of 1973. He was a notable figure during the unification process, and sided with the coalition "supporters" led by Reidar T. Larsen in the Communist Party. When the party broke off its ties to the Socialist Left Party, Fredh left the Communist Party to become a member of the Socialist Left. In the new party's first national convention, he was elected party secretary. In 1977 he was replaced by Lasse Jahnsen in the role of secretary.

In 1989 he became Secretary of the People's Alliance for Environment, Labor and Welfare, a small county list in Østfold which sought to support the candidacy of Larsen; he had lost his seat in the 1977 election. The coalition was made up of local Labour, Socialist Left and Communist Party members.
