= Arne Fjørtoft =

Norwegian journalist

Leader of the Liberal Party
- In office 2 May 1986 – 29 April 1990
- Preceded by: Odd Einar Dørum
- Succeeded by: Håvard Alstadheim

Personal details
- Born: Arne Johansson Fjørtoft; 28 March 1937 (age 89) Sauda Municipality, Norway.
- Spouse: Ragnhild Sælthun
- Occupation: Journalist
- Awards: Elephant Order by the King of Thailand, Gagarin Medal for Brave Initiatives; Venstre's Environment Prize; NGU's Youth Prize

Dr. Arne Fjørtoft (born 28 March 1937) is a Norwegian politician, journalist, author, organizational leader, communication specialist and social business inventor.

== Personal life ==
Fjørtoft was born on 28 March 1937 in Sauda Municipality. He is the son of Karl Johan Fjørtoft and Thea Lillehammer. He married the well-known channel host Ragnhild Sælthun in 1971, daughter of politician Ambjørg Sælthun.

== Career ==
He successfully served as reporter and news anchorman in Norwegian Broadcasting Corporation’s radio and television networks from 1964 to 1985. As a reporter on international issues he focused on human rights and sustainable development. In between he initiated several development projects, among them the first Norwegian Youth–based international project in 1967, Cey-Nor Development Foundation, working in disadvantaged fishing communities in Sri Lanka.

Fjørtoft was elected chair of Venstre, the Green-Liberal Party of Norway (the country's oldest party) in 1986. He served till 1990. During this period, Venstre became Norway's first party with a clear target for reduction of climate gases in the lead for a global campaign to reduce the danger of global warming. Other parties did not follow and an historic chance was lost.

Also he initiated the first national television network in Nepal and several community radio networks. In 1992 he initiated Radio Democratic Voice of Burma in cooperation with Burmese opposition leaders. This short wave radio network played a significant role in the process for democracy in Burma.

== Worldview International Foundation ==
In 1979, he initiated the Worldview International Foundation together with the then Foreign Minister of Sri Lanka (4 February 1978–1989), Dr Ananda Tissa De Alvis and Dr. A.C.S. Hameed, in the use of new media for public education on sustainable development.

Worldview has worked in 26 developing countries with 620 completed projects in various issues: communication, health, agriculture and food security, environment, education, democracy and human rights. Worldview has worked in close cooperation with UN Agencies and other international and national partners. The largest grass root project in Bangladesh created 2 million home gardens during 8 years and substantially reduced child blindness and child malnutrition.

Worldview's project Young Asia Television was launched in 1995 at the 50th anniversary of the United Nations, in support of human rights and sustainable development and has trained 2,600 communication professionals and 12,000 grass root communicators from 42 countries.

== Other initiatives ==
In the field of socially responsible business, Fjørtoft has initiated Paradise Farm for promotion of organic agriculture and specialization on healthy products, Pure Nature for value addition to fruit producers, 'Worldview Impact for tree planting and mitigation of greenhouse gases, Worldview Myanmar Royal Orchid to rescue endangered orchids and promote biodiversity, Nypa Nectar to create livelihood among disadvantaged communities in coastal areas by using Nypa palm sap as healthy sweetener to the market instead of harmful refined sugar. In 2012, Fjortoft initiated a national research project on restoration of mangrove forests in Myanmar, Worldview International Foundation in cooperation with Pathein University and Myeik University as a result of which Thor Heyerdahl Climate Park was founded. A new project on Adaptation to Climate Change is at the starting point.

== Awards ==
He was awarded the Order of the White Elephant by the King of Thailand for contribution to development in tribal areas and drug reduction campaigns, the Gagarin Medal for brave initiatives and sustained efforts on achievements, Venstre's Environment Prize, and the NGU's Youth Prize.

== Bibliography ==
Fjørtoft has written several books, numerous articles and speeches on international development and environment. Some of them are:

- Spelet om Bangladesh, Stavanger 1972.
- Alarm 1974. Rapport frå Afrika, Asia og Latin-Amerika, 1974.
- Befolkningsbomben. Overbefolkning, krig og fred (Jahn Otto Johansen og Thor Heyerdahl), 1985.
- Afrikas barn. Katastrofeåret 1985, 1985.
- Selvbiografien Rapport frå paradis : ein idé om fred og utvikling med forord av EUs visepresident Margot Wallström og etterord av Jørn-Kr. Jørgensen (Commentum Forlag). 2007.
