= Ragnhild Sælthun Fjørtoft =

Norwegian former television presenter (born 1947)

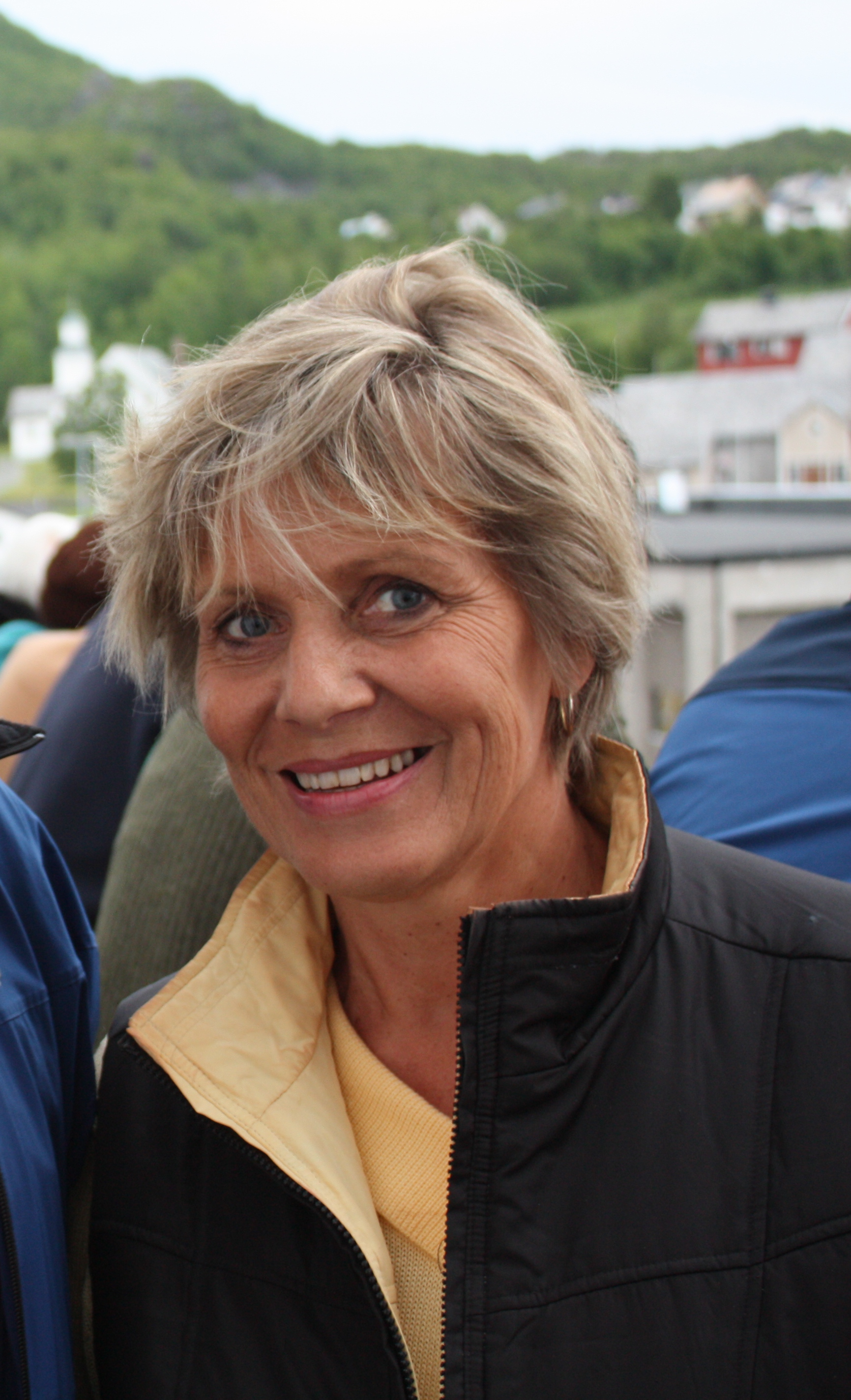
- Ragnhild Sælthun Fjørtoft in 2011
- Born: 9 June 1947 (age 78); Lærdal, Norway
- Occupation: television presenter
- Spouse: Arne Fjørtoft
- Parent: Ambjørg Sælthun

Ragnhild Sælthun Fjørtoft (born 9 June 1947) is a Norwegian former television presenter.

She was born in Lærdal Municipality to farmer Olaf Sælthun and politician Ambjørg Sælthun, and is married to Arne Fjørtoft .

She was assigned with NRK for 45 years, from 1969 to 2014. She has also been engaged in humanitarian work, and has been a board member of institutions such as Unicef Norway, the Strømme Foundation, FORUT and Antislaveriselskapet. She was awarded Kringkastingsprisen in 1994, Storegutprisen in 2004, the Gullruten honorary award in 2006, and the King's Medal of Merit in 2014.
