= Ambjørg Sælthun =

Norwegian politician

Ambjørg Sælthun, née Ødelien (27 July 1922 – 2 January 2012) was a Norwegian politician for the Centre Party.

She was born in Ål Municipality in Buskerud county. She was elected to the Norwegian Parliament from Sogn og Fjordane in 1973, and was re-elected on two occasions. She had previously served as a deputy representative during the term 1969–1973. From 1972 to 1973 she moved up as a regular representative, filling in for John Austrheim who was appointed to the cabinet Korvald.

On the local level he was a member of the municipal council of Lærdal Municipality from 1971 to 1975. She was a member of the central party board from 1976 to 1982, and chaired the Centre Party Women's Association (Senterkvinnene) during the same period.

Outside politics she was a farmer, having also worked briefly as a nurse. She was active in the Norwegian Agrarian Association, in Christian organizations, and was a member of the board of the publishing house Det Norske Samlaget from 1979 to 1983.

She died in January 2012. Sælthun's daughter Ragnhild Sælthun Fjørtoft is a presenter for the national television channel NRK1, and married to Arne Fjørtoft.
