= Bård Vegar Solhjell =

Norwegian politician

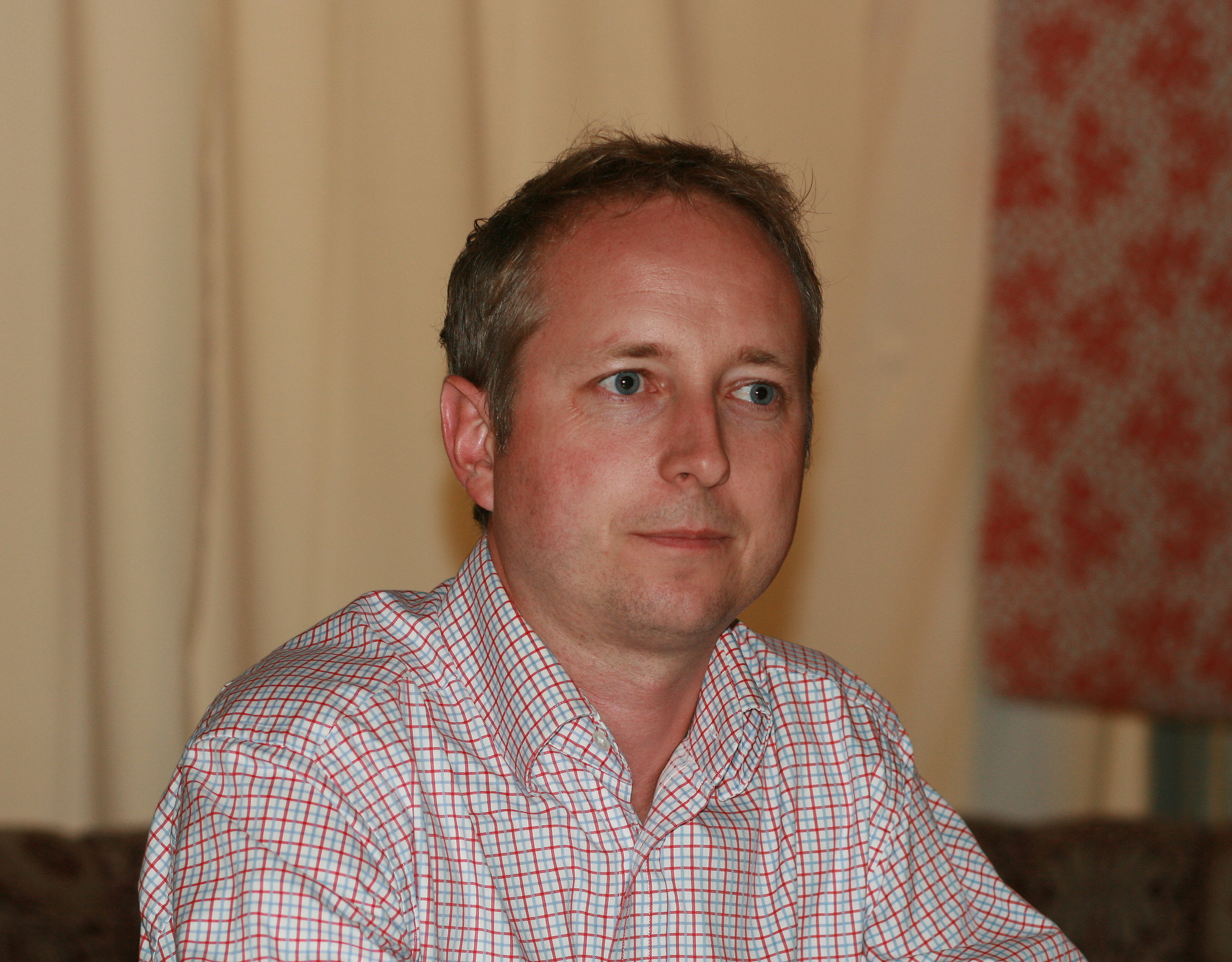

Minister of the Environment
- In office 23 March 2012 – 16 October 2013
- Prime Minister: Jens Stoltenberg
- Preceded by: Erik Solheim
- Succeeded by: Tine Sundtoft

Minister of Education and Research
- In office 18 October 2007 – 20 October 2009
- Prime Minister: Jens Stoltenberg
- Preceded by: Øystein Djupedal
- Succeeded by: Kristin Halvorsen

Deputy Leader of the Socialist Left Party
- In office 25 March 2007 – 29 November 2015 Serving with Audun Lysbakken
- Leader: Kristin Halvorsen; Audun Lysbakken
- Succeeded by: Snorre Valen

Secretary of the Socialist Left Party
- In office 2001–2005
- Leader: Kristin Halvorsen
- Preceded by: Turid Leirvoll
- Succeeded by: Edle Daasvand

Personal details
- Born: 22 December 1971 (age 54) Kristiansand, Vest-Agder, Norway
- Party: Socialist Left

Bård Vegar Solhjell (born 22 December 1971) is a former Norwegian politician for the Socialist Left Party. He served as Minister of Education from 2007 to 2009, and as Minister of the Environment from 2012 to 2013, both in Stoltenberg's Second Cabinet. Starting in March 2018, he is the Secretary General of WWF Norway.

== Biography ==
Solhjell was born in Kristiansand, and grew up in Sunnfjord in Sogn and Fjordane, Western Norway.

Solhjell holds a master's degree in political science, with emphasis on Sociology, Comparative Politics, and History of ideas, at both the University of Oslo and the University of Bergen. He has worked as a teacher, and in the postal service.

Solhjell was elected to Parliament in 2009 for Akershus County. He was a member of the Standing Committee on Foreign Affairs and Defence, as well as the Parliamentary leader of the Socialist Left Party's group. He was one of two deputy leaders of the Socialist Left Party from 2007 to 2015, and a member of its central committee since 1999.

Solhjell was party secretary of the Socialist Left Party 2001–2005. He was the deputy leader of Socialist Youth League between 1992 and 1994, before becoming a political adviser for the Socialist Left Party's Parliamentary group and a state secretary at the Prime Minister's office.

Solhjell was appointed as minister on 18 October 2007, succeeding Øystein Djupedal. Djupedal's old department was split during the 2007 reshuffle, and Solhjell was the minister in charge of kindergartens and lower education up to, and including, the high school level until a new government reshuffle in 2009.

In 2011, Solhjell published a book (Solidaritet på ny, Samlaget 2011) about solidarity, visions, and direction for the Norwegian red-green Government and for his political party, the Socialist Left Party (SV). Between 2001 and 2005, Solhjell was a member of the Norwegian Broadcasting Council. From 1992 to 1993, he was a board member of the organization "No to the EU".

Bård Vegar Solhjell is married, with 3 children. He lives in Son, just outside Oslo. He enjoys music and literature, and coaches a children's football team.

== Political appointments ==
- 2012–2013 Minister of the Environment
- 2009–2012 Member of Parliament for the Socialist Left Party
- 2007–2009 Minister of Education
- 2005–2007 State Secretary at the Prime Minister's office
- 2001–2005 Party Secretary for the Socialist Left Party
- 1999– Member of the Central Board in the Socialist Left Party

== Work Experience ==
- 2000–2001 Political Adviser at the Parliamentary Committee of the Socialist Left Party
- 1994 Political Adviser of the Socialist Left Party

== Education ==
- 2000– Master's degree in political science, with sociology, comparative politics, and history of ideas, from University of Oslo and University of Bergen

Political offices
Preceded by Øystein Djupedal	Norwegian Minister of Education and Research; 2007–2009	Succeeded by Kristin Halvorsen
Preceded by Erik Solheim	Norwegian Minister of the Environment; 2012–2013	Succeeded by Tine Sundtoft
