= Hilde Vogt =

Norwegian politician

Secretary of the Socialist Left Party
- In office 1985–1989
- Preceded by: Erik Solheim
- Succeeded by: Bente Sandvig

Personal details
- Born: 3 November 1945 (age 79)
- Political party: Socialist Left Party

Hilde Vogt (born 3 November 1945) is a Norwegian politician for the Socialist Left Party. She was Party Secretary of the Socialist Left Party from 1985 to 1989.

She served as a deputy representative to the Norwegian Parliament from Hedmark during the term 1985–1989 and 1993–1997.
