= Secretary of the Socialist Left Party =

This is a list of party secretaries of the Socialist Left Party which spans a history of over 35 years.

== List of party secretaries ==
Party leaders are indicated with a blue background.

Name	Term	Comments
Berge Furre	1961–1964	Former parliamentary leader
Kjell Bygstad	1964–1967	
Ole Kopreitan	1967–1969	
Per Maurseth	1969–1973	
Svein Skotheim	1973–1975	Last Party Secretary of the Socialist People's Party
Rune Fredh	1975–1977	Organisational Secretary of the Socialist Electoral League from 1973 to 1975
Lasse Jahnsen	1977–1979	
Liss Schanche	1979–1981	
Erik Solheim	1981–1985	Former parliamentary leader
Hilde Vogt	1985–1989	
Bente Sandvig	1989–1993	
Turid Leirvoll	1993–2001	
Bård Vegar Solhjell	2001–2005	Current deputy leader
Edle Daasvand	2005–2009	
Silje Schei Tveitdal	2009—present	
