= Theo Koritzinsky =

Norwegian politician (born 1941)

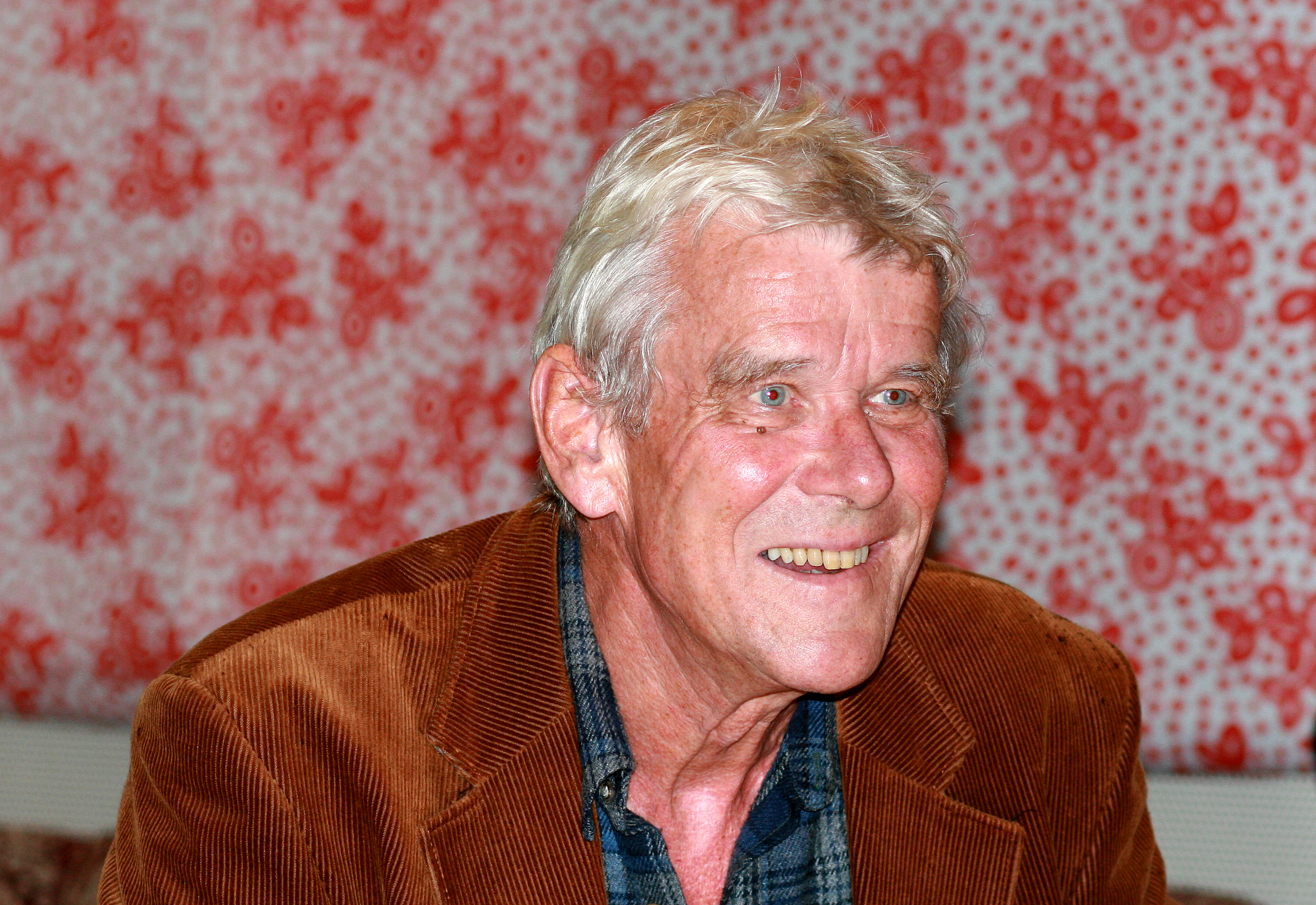
Theo Koritzinsky in Stavanger, 2008

Theodor Koritzinsky (born 2 November 1941) is a Norwegian academic and politician for the Socialist Left Party.

He was chairman of the Socialist Youth League from 1965 to 1966. He later joined the Socialist Left Party, and was their chairman from 1983 to 1987. He was elected to the Norwegian Parliament from Oslo in 1985, and was re-elected on one occasion.

He is currently associate professor in the pedagogy of social sciences at Oslo University College.

Koritzinsky was born in Trondheim, and completed his examen artium at Oslo Cathedral School in 1961.

Party political offices
| Preceded by Ole Kopreitan | Chairman of the Socialist Youth Association; 1965–1966 | Succeeded by Peder Martin Lysestøl |
| Preceded by Berge Furre | Chairman of the Socialist Left Party; 1983–1987 | Succeeded by Erik Solheim |
