= Ole Kopreitan =

Norwegian politician (1937–2011)

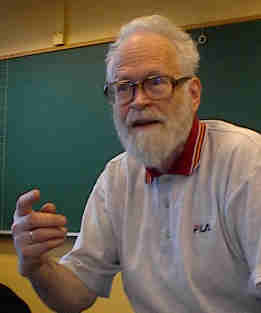
Kopreitan in 2004

Ole Andreas Kopreitan (19 September 1937 – 23 January 2011) was a Norwegian political activist, best known as an anti-nuclear activist. For 30 years, he led the anti-nuclear organization "No to Nuclear Weapons".

He was born in Stavanger as a son of Christian missionary Ole August Kopreitan (1885–1941) and clothing worker Anna Ottervig (1907–1999). He grew up in Hitra Municipality, but moved to Hurdal Municipality when he was nine years old. He was educated at the teachers' college in Sagene.

He became a political activist in Oslo, and was among others known for storming Madserud tennis court on 13 May 1964, with 50 others, to halt a tennis competition between Norway and South Africa, in protest of apartheid. For this he was convicted for civil disobedience. At that time he was also involved in partisan politics, as chairman of the Socialist Youth Association (SUF). He was a party secretary of the Socialist People's Party from 1967. He later drifted away from partisan politics, mostly due to internal strife in the Socialist People's Party. He instead joined the popular movement Folkebevegelsen mot EF, which worked, successfully, to prevent Norwegian membership in the European Communities.

For 30 years, Kopreitan led the anti-nuclear organization Nei til Atomvåpen (No to Nuclear Weapons). Aside from managing organizational affairs in Nei til Atomvåpen, he was very well known for spreading leaflets and selling campaign buttons from a cart on Norway's main street, Karl Johans gate. In 2002, he was awarded the Nuclear-Free Future Award.

He was formerly married to Turid Evang, a daughter of Karl Evang, but the marriage was dissolved. In 1999, he married nurse Isabel Ortiz.

Party political offices
New title	Chairman of the Socialist Youth Association (SUF); 1963–1965	Succeeded by Theo Koritzinsky
