= Turid Leirvoll =

Norwegian politician (born 1956)

Secretary of the Socialist Left Party
- In office 1993–2001
- Preceded by: Bente Sandvig
- Succeeded by: Bård Vegar Solhjell

Personal details
- Born: 24 June 1956 (age 68); Rogaland, Norway
- Political party: Socialist Left Party

Turid Leirvoll (born 24 June 1956 in Rogaland) is a Norwegian and Danish politician who was Party Secretary of the Norwegian Socialist Left Party from 1993 to 2001. She is the current Party Secretary of the Danish Socialist People's Party.
