= Heming Olaussen =

Norwegian politician (born 1949)

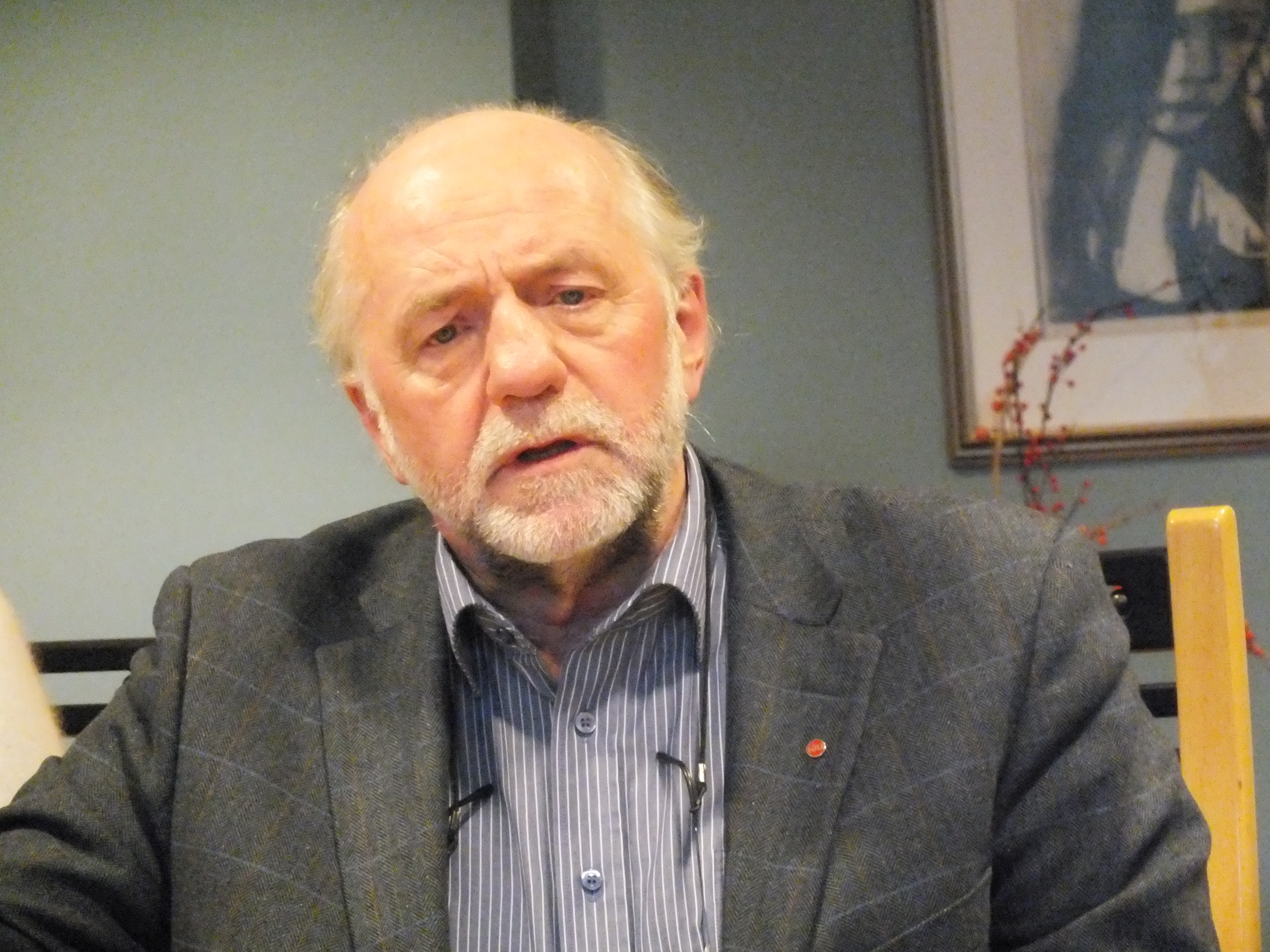
Heming Olaussen

Henning Olaussen (born 23 March 1949) was the leader of Nei til EU from 2004 to 2014, an organisation working against Norway becoming a member of the EU.

He took over the leadership from longtime leader Sigbjørn Gjelsvik at the 2004 congress. He is a former member of the Socialist Left Party.

He is the father of Inga Marte Thorkildsen, member of parliament for the Socialist Left Party.

Preceded by Sigbjørn Gjelsvik	Leader of Nei til EU; 2004–present	Incumbent
