= Technological University, Pathein =

Public university in Pathein, Myanmar

Coordinates: 16°50′15″N 94°49′11″E

Technological University(Pathein)
- နည်းပညာတက္ကသိုလ် (ပုသိမ်)
- Motto: Promote Technology towards Innovation
- Type: Public
- Established: December 27, 1999; 26 years ago
- Principal: Dr Kyaw Thu Ya
- Location: Pathein, Myanmar
- Website: patheintu.edu.mm

Technological University (Pathein) is situated at the Apin-ne-se village in Pathein District, Ayeyawady Division, Myanmar. It was opened on 27 December 1999 as Government Technological College (G.T.C) and became Technological University (Pathein) on 20 January 2007. The university is run by Ministry of Education (Myanmar).

== Departments ==
- Department of Civil Engineering
- Department of Electronic Engineering
- Department of Electrical Power Engineering
- Department of Mechanical Engineering
- Department of Information Technology

== Academic Departments ==
- Department of Myanmar
- Department of Engineering Chemistry
- Department of English
- Department of Engineering Mathematics
- Department of Engineering Physics

== Programs ==
- B.E Degree Courses for following engineering majors:
  - Civil Engineering
  - Electronics Engineering
  - Electrical Power Engineering
  - Mechanical Engineering
  - Information Technology

== Degree Offer ==
Graduate Program	Degree	Year
Bachelor of Civil Engineering	B.E. (Civil)	6yrs
Bachelor of Electronic Engineering	B.E. (EC)	6yrs
Bachelor of Electrical Power Engineering	B.E. (EP)	6yrs
Bachelor of Mechanical Engineering	B.E. (ME)	6yrs
Bachelor of Information Technology	B.E. (IT)	6yrs

== Ranking ==
In 2020, according to by the uniRank, it was ranked 57 th in the country.

== See also ==
- Yangon Technological University
- West Yangon Technological University
- List of Technological Universities in Myanmar
