= Kristin Halvorsen =

Norwegian politician

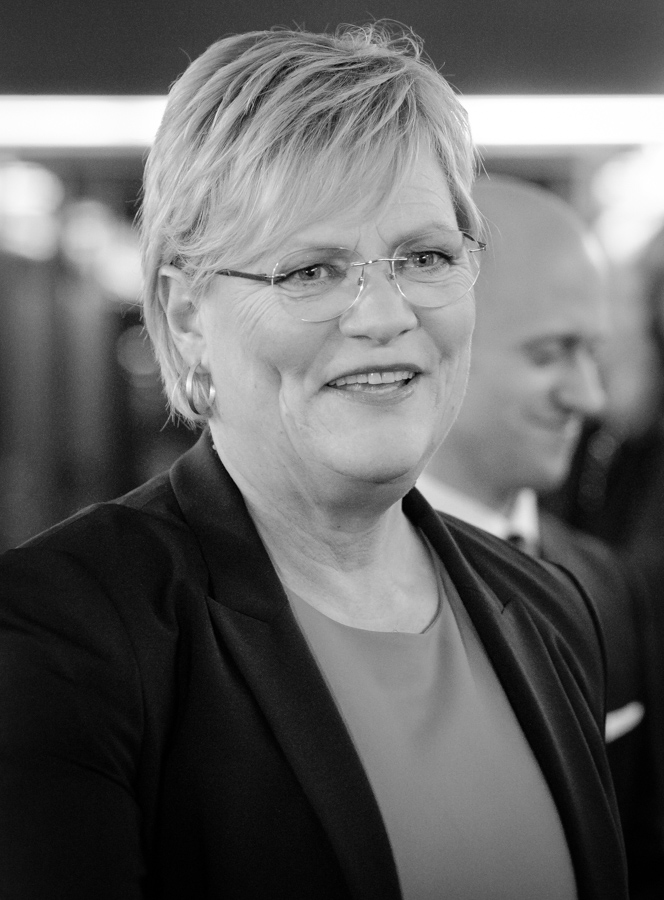
- Halvorsen in 2018.

Minister of Education and Research
- In office 20 October 2009 – 16 October 2013
- Prime Minister: Jens Stoltenberg
- Preceded by: Bård Vegar Solhjell
- Succeeded by: Torbjørn Røe Isaksen

Minister of Finance
- In office 17 October 2005 – 20 October 2009
- Prime Minister: Jens Stoltenberg
- Preceded by: Per-Kristian Foss
- Succeeded by: Sigbjørn Johnsen

Leader of the Socialist Left Party
- In office 3 May 1997 – 11 March 2012
- Deputy: Øystein Djupedal; Bård Vegar Solhjell; Audun Lysbakken
- Preceded by: Erik Solheim
- Succeeded by: Audun Lysbakken

Member of the Storting
- In office 1 October 1989 – 30 September 2013
- Deputy: Heidi Sørensen; Akhtar Chaudhry
- Constituency: Oslo

Personal details
- Born: 2 September 1960 (age 66) Horten, Vestfold, Norway
- Party: Socialist Left
- Spouse: Charlo Halvorsen
- Children: 2
- Education: University of Oslo

Kristin Halvorsen (born 2 September 1960) is a Norwegian politician of the Socialist Left Party. She served as Minister of Finance from 2005 to 2009 and as Minister of Education from 2009 to 2013. She also served as the party's leader from 1997 to 2012 and a member of parliament representing Oslo, from 1989 to 2013.

Taking over as leader of the Socialist Left Party in 1997, she established an unprecedented level of consensus within the party. At the 2005 election, the party received a disappointing 8.8% share of the vote, and in 2009 down further, to 6.2%. She stepped down as leader in 2012, and was succeeded by Audun Lysbakken on 11 March.

The Socialist Left, in coalition with the Labour Party and the Centre Party, won Norway's September 2005 parliamentary elections. The resulting Red-Green coalition government marked the first time that the Socialist Left Party was included in the cabinet. Halvorsen took office as Minister of Finance, becoming the first woman to hold the position.

== Background ==
Halvorsen was born in Horten, Vestfold. After taking university courses in pedagogy (1.5 years) and criminology (1 year) without receiving a degree, Halvorsen worked for a while as a legal secretary. She served as a vice member to the Parliament from 1985, and was elected member of Parliament in 1989, representing the county of Oslo, a seat she has held ever since. She has been a member of the parliamentary standing Committee on Finance (1989–1997) and the Committee on Scrutiny and Constitutional Affairs (1997–2001). She is presently a member of the Election Committee and the Committee on Foreign Affairs, and Chairman of the Socialist Left Party's parliamentary group, but is on leave from these positions while sitting in government.

Halvorsen was the first Norwegian party leader to launch a blog.

After leaving active politics, Halvorsen transitioned into environmental leadership. Halvorsen has been the director of the CICERO Centre for International Climate Science since 2016. Halvorsen also serves as Vice Chairperson of the China Council for International Cooperation on Environment and Development (CCICED), contributing to global environmental governance. She sits on the board of Statkraft and was the acting chair of the Norwegian Research Council.

== Personal life ==
Kristin Halvorsen's parents are Leif Georg Halvorsen, a civil engineer, and Marit Larsen, a teacher. Kristin is married to Charlo Halvorsen, an editor at Norsk Rikskringkasting.

== Controversies ==
=== Kindergarten coverage promise ===
In the electoral campaign of the 2005 election Halvorsen announced that she would leave politics if the government would not be able to provide all citizens with kindergarten for their children by the end of 2007, and proclaimed that "this is so important for me that you'll get rid of me if we don't accomplish this". While she stood firmly by her announcement even two months after the election, she in October 2006 simply withdrew her promise, stating that "what I have said is that we'll have full coverage in 2007. But nobody will get rid of me if full coverage is missing in one or two municipalities". By the end of 2007, 90 percent of municipalities will be able to offer kindergarten for all applicants, with the not fully covered constituting approximately 43 municipalities in Norway.

=== Poverty resolved "with the stroke of a pen" claim ===
In the same electoral campaign she claimed that poverty in Norway could be eliminated "with the stroke of a pen". After being elected to government and becoming Minister of Finance, by the end of the four-year term she had not accomplished this, as homelessness was actually increasing. When attending a television program during the 2009 electoral campaign, she also refused to apologise to the poor in Norway for her failure.

=== Israel boycott ===
On 5 January 2006, Halvorsen caused a controversy by calling for boycott of Israeli products as a sign of solidarity with the Palestinians. The government and the other parties in the coalition distanced themselves from these remarks, and Halvorsen later apologized as foreign matters were outside her government position.

In January 2009, Halvorsen took part in anti-Israel protests which erupted into violent riots.

== Books ==
- Rett fra hjertet (Straight from the Heart), 2004

Party political offices
Preceded by Erik Solheim	Leader of the Socialist Left Party; 1997–2012	Succeeded by Audun Lysbakken
Political offices
Preceded by Per Kristian Foss	Minister of Finance; 2005–2009	Succeeded by Sigbjørn Johnsen
Preceded by Bård Vegar Solhjell	Minister of Education and Research; 2009–2013	Succeeded by Torbjørn Røe Isaksen
