= Erik Solheim =

Norwegian diplomat and politician

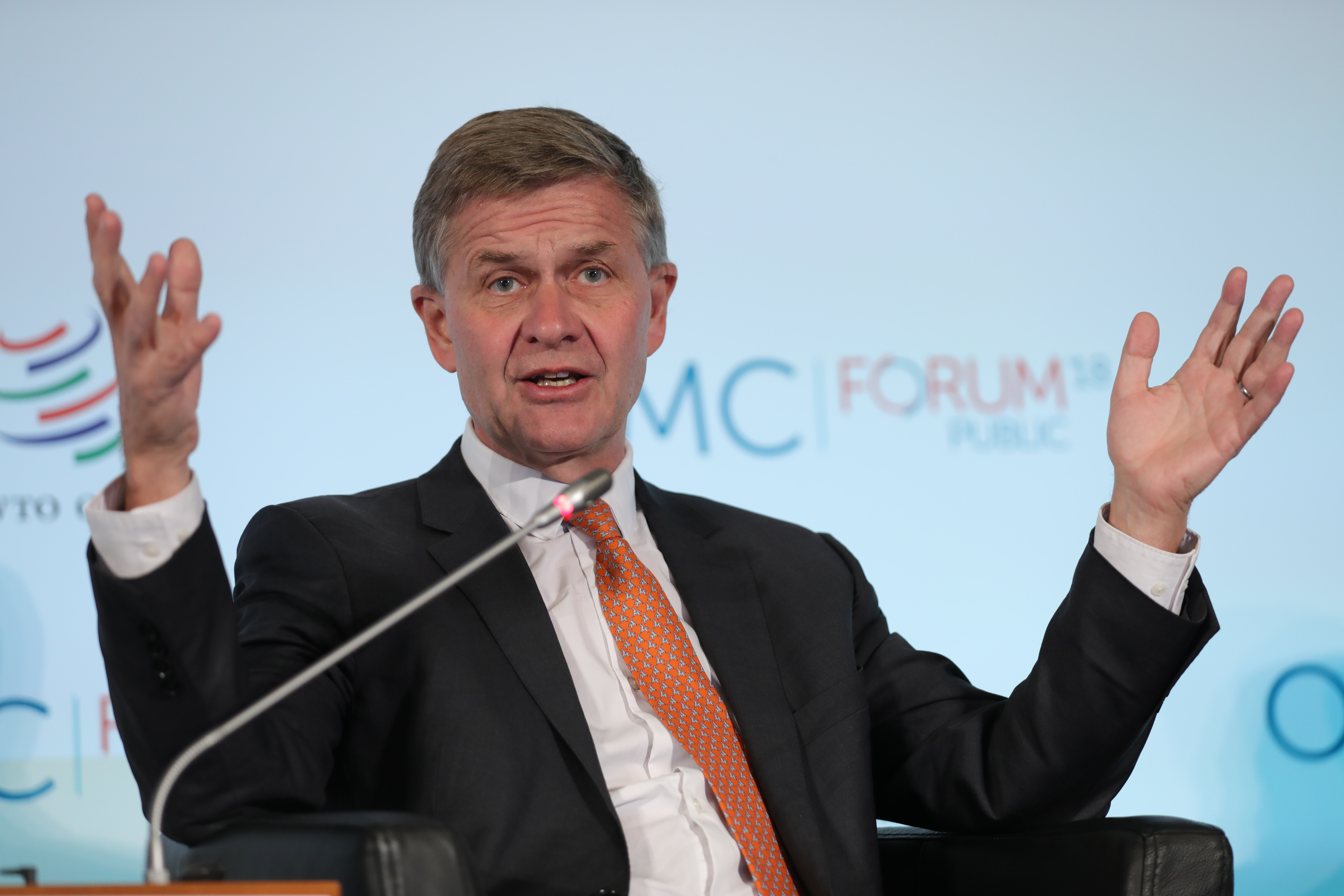
- Solheim in 2018

Executive Director of United Nations Environment Programme-UNEP
- In office June 2016 – November 2018
- Secretary-General: António Guterres
- Preceded by: Achim Steiner
- Succeeded by: Joyce Msuya (Acting)

Minister of International Development
- In office 17 October 2005 – 23 March 2012
- Prime Minister: Jens Stoltenberg
- Preceded by: Hilde Frafjord Johnson
- Succeeded by: Heikki Holmås

Minister of the Environment
- In office 18 October 2007 – 23 March 2012
- Prime Minister: Jens Stoltenberg
- Preceded by: Helen Bjørnøy
- Succeeded by: Bård Vegard Solhjell

Member of Parliament
- In office 1 October 1989 – 30 September 2001
- Constituency: Oslo

Leader of the Socialist Left Party
- In office 5 April 1987 – 3 May 1997
- Preceded by: Theo Koritzinsky
- Succeeded by: Kristin Halvorsen

Secretary of the Socialist Left Party
- In office 1981–1985
- Preceded by: Liss Schanche
- Succeeded by: Hilde Vogt

Personal details
- Born: 18 January 1955 (age 71) Oslo, Norway
- Party: Green Party
- Other political affiliations: Socialist Left Party (until 2019)
- Spouse: Gry Ulverud
- Children: 4
- Education: University of Oslo
- Profession: Diplomat

Military service
- Allegiance: Norway
- Branch/service: Norwegian Air Force

Erik Solheim (born 18 January 1955) is a Norwegian diplomat and former politician. He served in the Norwegian government from 2005 to 2012 as Minister of International Development and Minister of the Environment, and as Under-Secretary-General of the United Nations and Executive Director of the United Nations Environment Programme from 2016 to 2018. Solheim is a member of the Green Party. Erik Solheim has 4 children from two marriages.

Solheim was formerly a politician for the Socialist Left Party (SV); he led its youth branch, the Socialist Youth, from 1977 to 1981, was party secretary from 1981 to 1985, and served as a member of the Parliament of Norway from 1989 to 2001. He was leader of the Socialist Left Party from 1987 to 1997. During Solheim's tenure as party leader the party moved closer to the centre and abandoned many former hard-left stances. Within the party, Solheim was considered part of the right wing, and his reforms made him strongly unpopular on the left wing of his own party.

In 2000 Solheim left Norwegian politics to take up an appointment as a special adviser in the Ministry of Foreign Affairs working as a participant in the Norwegian delegation that unsuccessfully attempted to resolve the Sri Lankan Civil War before the outbreak of Eelam War IV. Solheim returned to Norwegian politics in 2005 when he was appointed Minister of International Development. In 2007 he additionally became the Minister of the Environment, and he held both offices until 2012.

After leaving the government in 2012, he returned to his previous position as a special adviser in the Ministry of Foreign Affairs, and from 2013 to 2016 Solheim was chair of the OECD Development Assistance Committee in Paris. He was Under-Secretary-General of the United Nations and Executive Director of the United Nations Environment Programme from 2016 to 2018. In November 2018 he stepped down following an internal UN audit that criticized his frequent international travel and some internal rule breaking.

Since he left the government, Solheim sometimes made critical remarks about the Socialist Left Party. Solheim later expressed his support for the centrist Green Party and was active as a strategic adviser for the party during the 2015 elections. He became a member of the Green Party in 2019.

== Biography ==
Born in Oslo, Solheim attended high school at Oslo Cathedral School and, after serving conscription for the Norwegian Air Force in Bodø (1974–75), graduated from the University of Oslo in 1980 with a cand.mag. degree after studying history, sociology and political science. After 11 years in parliament he worked for five years for the Norwegian Ministry of Foreign Affairs before being appointed Minister.

== Norwegian politics ==
Solheim was the leader of Socialist Youth 1977–1980 and party secretary of the Socialist Left Party 1981–1985. In 1987, he became leader of the Socialist Left Party and rose quickly to become a popular figure in Norwegian politics. In the 1989 election he was elected to Parliament from Sør-Trøndelag in what was to then SVs best election, but was the following two elections (in 1993 and 1997 Solheim was elected from Oslo). He was controversial within his own party because he was considered to be too right-wing. In 1997, after ten years as party leader, he stepped down and was succeeded by Kristin Halvorsen. Through the 1990s Solheim became one of the most prominent figures in Norwegian politics, and led his party through a period of rising popularity. In later years he has received criticism from some older party colleagues for moderating his views on the European Union and becoming a supporter of Norway's membership in NATO.

Solheim was appointed Minister of International Development on 17 October 2005 as part of Stoltenberg's Second Cabinet, the first time Solheim's party sat in the Cabinet. On 18 October 2007, he was also appointed Minister of the Environment. He held both posts until 23 March 2012, when he was—against his own wish—moved by newly appointed party leader Audun Lysbakken.

== International peace maker ==
=== 2002 Truce in Sri Lanka ===
From the spring of 2000 he was granted a leave of absence from parliament to serve as special advisor to the Norwegian Ministry of Foreign Affairs in Sri Lanka. He went on to become one of the most recognizable figures in the peace negotiations between the Sri Lankan government and the Tamil Tigers.

Solheim helped negotiate a truce in 2002. On 17 October 2005, he continued his engagement with international affairs when he was appointed Minister of International Development in the cabinet of Prime Minister Jens Stoltenberg. In this position, he was able to continue his work on the Sri Lanka issue.

=== Post 2006 activities ===
Solheim met with the Sri Lankan Foreign Minister and U.S. Undersecretary of State Nicholas Burns on 23 January 2006.

After meeting with the officials, Solheim told journalists in Colombo, "Everyone is worried with the present deteriorating security situation. It is hard to see the present situation continuing indefinitely. Sri Lanka is at a crossroads."

After meeting with Sri Lankan President Mahinda Rajapakse, Undersecretary Burns expressed hope that "the LTTE understands that it will have no relations with my country, and for that matter any effective relations with any country in the world, on the barrel of the gun."

President Rajapakse and Solheim met the day after. Solheim then went north and met with Tamil Tiger rebel leader Velupillai Prabhakaran and rebel negotiator Anton Balasingham. Dumeetha Luthra of BBC News said Solheim's visit was seen as crucial to saving the truce.

==== 2006 peace talks ====
Solheim announced on 12 September 2006 that the Government of Sri Lanka and the Tamil Tigers had agreed to hold "unconditional peace talks" in October in Oslo.

Solheim told BBC News officials that "Both parties have expressed willingness to come back to the table. We expect the violence will be stopped. The government has throughout its existence for 10 months repeatedly told us that they are ready for talks without any preconditions and the LTTE has today confirmed that they are ready for talks without any preconditions."

==== Government reaction ====
Keheliya Rambukwella, a spokesman for the Sri Lankan government, acknowledged that the government was ready for talks, "but we did not agree on Oslo for unconditional peace talks." Officials from the European Union, Japan, Norway and the United States, meeting in Brussels to discuss the conflict, released a statement in support of the peace talks.

Government spokesman Rambukwella denied that the government agreed to unconditional negotiations, saying, "We will put forward our conditions." Rambukwella criticized the Norwegian government for announcing the talks without consulting the Sri Lankan government: "The government has not been consulted on any future discussions. Norway, or anybody, can't announce dates and venues. We will take it up very seriously. We are a sovereign state. They are only facilitators. We have not delegated any of our powers to them."

The Sri Lankan Government's chief negotiator, Nimal Siripala De Silva, filed an official complaint about Solheim's announcement to the press to Norwegian Ambassador Hans Brattskar when they met, along with Sri Lankan Foreign Secretary S. Palihakkara and Norwegian Embassy spokesman Eric Nurnberg, at the Norwegian Foreign Ministry. Minister De Silva said he hoped to discuss the "future role of the international community in the Sri Lankan Peace Process and the future course of action on the peace front" at this meeting. He also expressed a desire for a "sincere commitment to the process from the LTTE leader Prabakaran" to reporters.

=== Aftermath ===
His attempts of peacemaking were in the end unsuccessful, with the Asian Tribune concluding that "his handling of relationship with Sri Lanka" was an "utter failure". In 2010, Minister of Foreign Affairs Jonas Gahr Støre thus instead took control over the bilateral relations between Sri Lanka and Norway, with Eva Kristin Hansen stating that "Norway will ensure that Norway-Sri Lanka relations are brought back to the way they were." In January 2011 Erik Solheim offered to play the role of a "dialogue partner" between the Sri Lankan government and communities living in exile, possibly a reference to the Tamil Diaspora or the LTTE supporters who have formed a government in exile.

In an interview with journalists Easwaran Rutnam and Jamila Najmuddin, the Norwegian Minister of Environment, who has been often labelled in Sri Lanka as being pro-LTTE, said that the recent Wikileaks reports on him proved that he was not biased towards one party. Solheim also rejected the idea of a separate State in Sri Lanka and urged the Tamil Diaspora to seek dialogue and work through democratic means to achieve their goals. The LTTE had recently created a government in exile, also known as the Transnational government of Tamil Ealam which demands for a separate State and obtained the support of some of the Tamil Diaspora especially those living in Canada.

== Controversies ==
=== Sri Lanka exchange of gifts ===
In an interview with Sri Lanka's Daily News, Colonel Karuna, a former LTTE regional commander and a current member of the Sri Lankan parliament, levelled claims of Norwegian support for the LTTE and the existence of an exchange of goods, including gifts such as TVs and large sums of money between Solheim and LTTE leadership. Solheim has denied the allegations made against him and has complained that these accusations are the fabrications of the media. The Norwegian Ministry of Foreign Affairs stated that they are surprised about the "obvious lies about Mr. Solheim". also stating that there is "no basis in reality" for the accusations. In an open letter to the editor of the Sunday Times newspaper, in reply to an article published on 15 April 2007, the Norwegian Ambassador to Sri Lanka, Hans Brattskar, also "categorically refuted allegations made by a Norwegian national, who happened to be a convicted murderer and his organization Norwegians Against Terrorism, to the effect that Norway has funded terrorism." also stating that "Unfortunately, similar allegations based on the very same source, have lately also been published and broadcast by other parts of the Sri Lankan media." "Norwegians Against Terrorism" is a one-man band led by convicted murderer Falk Rune Rovik. Rovik also posted a video of LTTE leadership visiting the Norwegian Special Forces Training Camp in Rena, which showed the LTTE receiving instruction on their weapons, tactics and military strategies. The content or authenticity of this video was never refuted by Solheim or the Norwegian government.

In May 2011, Aftenposten stated that Norwegian Embassy personnel in Colombo had secretly helped LTTE personnel to leave Sri Lanka. This practice was defended by Erik Solheim, who stated that Norway had a long tradition of helping people at risk.

=== Commercial and Chinese promotion ===
Before being asked to resign as head of UNEP, Solheim was criticized for his promotion of a vast and environmentally controversial Chinese infrastructure project, the Belt and Road Initiative, as well as Chinese investments in Africa. Solheim defended himself against accusations of nepotism and conflict of interest. Deutsche Welle editorialized that "his actions paint a questionable picture of a corrupt politician using a position of privilege to his own advantage."

== Work in intergovernmental organisations ==
=== OECD ===
In January 2013, Erik Solheim was appointed head of the Organisation for Economic Co-operation and Development's Development Assistance Committee (DAC). He took over from Brian Atwood who stepped down in December 2012. The DAC is an international forum for bilateral providers of development co-operation. It aims to promote development co-operation in order to contribute to sustainable development. Solheim focussed on reform of official development assistance, providing more support to the least developed countries. He has also sought to blend development assistance with private investment and better taxation systems in recipient countries.

=== UNEP ===
In May 2016, Solheim was appointed Executive Director of the United Nations Environment Programme. He succeeded Achim Steiner in that post in June 2016.

A 2018 internal audit by the United Nations Office of Internal Oversight Services (OIOS) questioned Solheim's ability to lead the UNEP, particularly in light of his "extensive travel patterns" and general management style. As a consequence, the governments of Denmark, Sweden, Japan, Belgium and the Netherlands halted their funding to UNEP, leaving the organisation facing a major funding crisis. On 20 November 2018, United Nations Secretary-General António Guterres accepted Solheim's resignation, after asking him to step down.

== Other activities ==
- EAT Foundation (EAT), Member of the Advisory Board (since 2017)
- Reconsidering European Contributions to Global Justice (GLOBUS), Member of the Policy Advisory Board
- The Economics of Ecosystems and Biodiversity (TEEB), Member of the Advisory Board
- International Olympic Committee (IOC), Member of the Sustainability and Legacy Commission

== Climate Observation ==
He stated that climate coalitions will still win in spite of the Trump election.

== See also ==
- Catherine M. Russell
- Qu Dongyu

Political offices
Preceded by Hilde Frafjord Johnson	Norwegian Minister of International Development; 2005–2012	Succeeded by Heikki Holmås
Preceded by Helen Bjørnøy	Norwegian Minister of the Environment; 2007–2012	Succeeded by Bård Vegar Solhjell
Party political offices
Preceded by Liss Schanche	Party Secretary of the Socialist Left Party; 1981–1985	Succeeded by Hilde Vogt
Preceded by Theo Koritzinsky	Party Leader of the Socialist Left Party; 1987–1997	Succeeded by Kristin Halvorsen
