= Second Stoltenberg cabinet =

Government of Norway from 2005 to 2013

- Cabinet of Norway

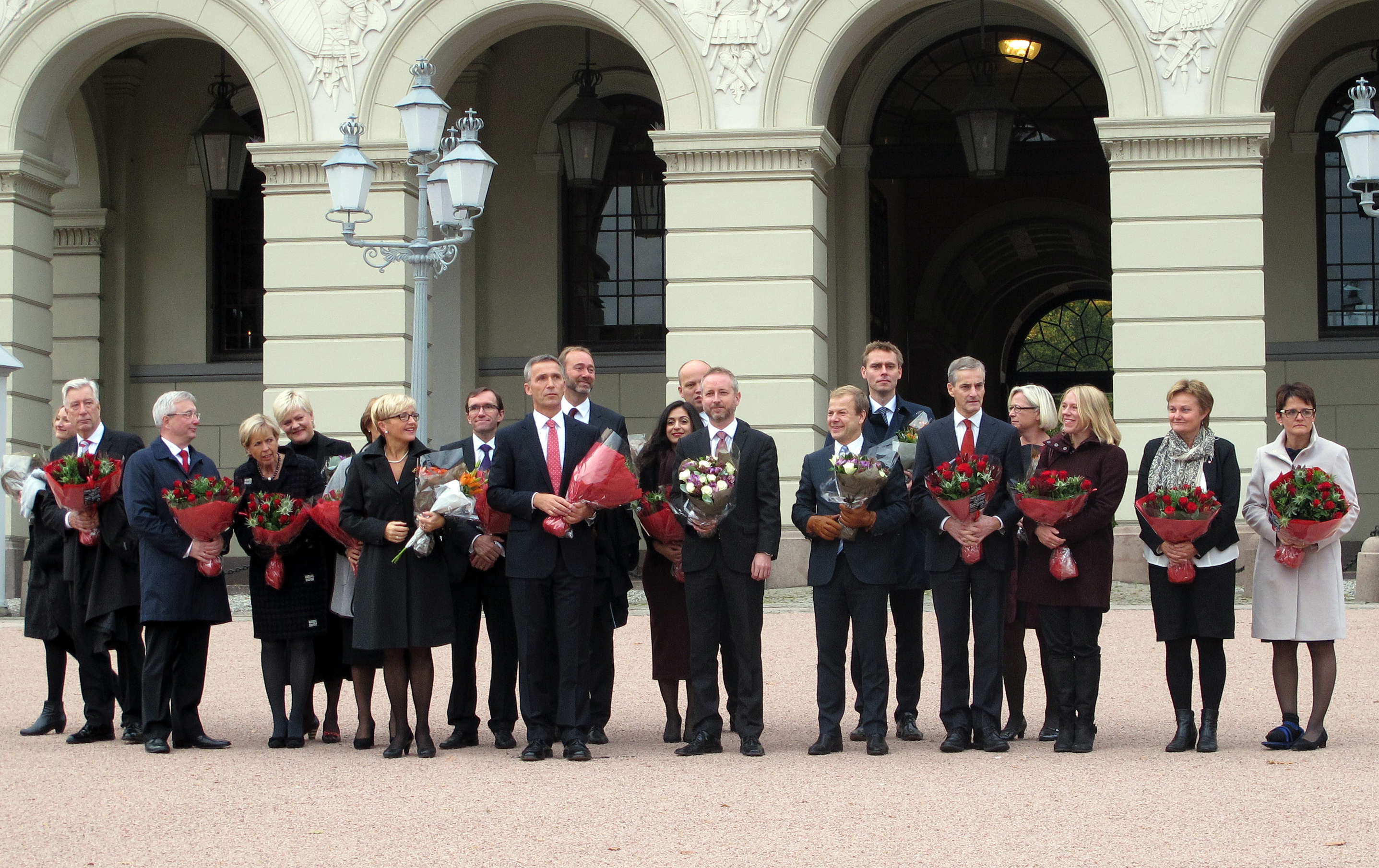
- Resignation of the cabinet on 16 October 2013
- Date formed: 17 October 2005
- Date dissolved: 16 October 2013

People and organisations
- King: Harald V of Norway
- Prime Minister: Jens Stoltenberg
- Member parties: Labour Party; Socialist Left Party; Centre Party
- Status in legislature: Red–Green Coalition (majority)

History
- Incoming formation: 2005 parliamentary election
- Outgoing formation: 2013 parliamentary election
- Elections: 2005, 2009
- Legislature terms: 2005–2009; 2009–2013
- Predecessor: Second Bondevik cabinet
- Successor: Solberg Cabinet

The Second Stoltenberg cabinet was the Government of Norway from 17 October 2005 to 16 October 2013. It was a coalition between the Labour Party, the Socialist Left Party and the Centre Party, known as the Red–Green Coalition. On 9 September 2013, the coalition was defeated in the 2013 election.

The cabinet had ten members from the Labour Party, five from the Socialist Left Party and four from the Centre Party. It replaced Bondevik's Second Cabinet following the 2005 parliamentary election where the three parties won a majority in parliament. In the 2009 parliamentary election, the three parties retained their majority, and the coalition continued.

The cabinet is the first time the Socialist Left Party has sat in government, and the second time, after the post-war interim Gerhardsen's First Cabinet, where the Labour Party sits in a coalition government. It was the first cabinet to have had a majority of women, the first to have had a member with a non-Western heritage and the first to have had a member who was a Muslim.

== Replacements ==
There have been several changes since Prime Minister Jens Stoltenberg presented his first team in October 2005:

- On 29 September 2006, Odd Eriksen resigned as Minister of Trade and Industry, and was succeeded by Dag Terje Andersen.
- On 21 September 2007, Odd Roger Enoksen resigned as Minister of Petroleum and Energy and was replaced by Åslaug Haga, who was succeeded as Minister of Local Government and Regional Development by Magnhild Meltveit Kleppa, thus making the first government in the history of Norway with more women than men.
- On 18 October 2007, Helen Bjørnøy resigned as Minister of Environment and Øystein Djupedal as Minister of Education and Science. Fellow Socialist Left Party minister Erik Solheim became joint Minister of International Development and Environment (though the two roles were not merged, International Development is part of the Ministry of Foreign Affairs), while Djupedal was succeeded by Bård Vegard Solhjell as Minister of Education and Tora Aasland as Minister of Science. Karita Bekkemellem resigned as Minister of Children and Equality and was replaced by Norway's first minister with a minority background, Manuela Ramin-Osmundsen.
- On 15 February 2008, Ramin-Osmundsen was forced to resign following the strong criticism she faced after withholding information and lying to the Prime Minister on a possible conflict of interest in appointing a new children's ombudsman. Anniken Huitfeldt was appointed new minister on 29 February 2008.
- On 20 June 2008, Åslaug Haga resigned as Minister of Petroleum and Energy citing health problems following press revelations about a building violations scandal. The resignation led to a major reshuffle. Haga was replaced as Minister of Petroleum and Energy by Terje Riis-Johansen, who was himself replaced as Minister of Agriculture and Food by member of parliament and fellow Centre Party politician Lars Peder Brekk. Among the Labour Party ministers, Dag Terje Andersen moved to the Ministry of Labour and Social Inclusion and was replaced as Minister of Industry and Trade by Sylvia Brustad. Her former Ministry of Health and Care Services was taken by Bjarne Håkon Hanssen.
- On 2 October 2009, Dag Terje Andersen resigned as Minister of Labour and Social Inclusion to become President of the Storting and Helga Pedersen as Minister of Fisheries and Coastal Affairs to become parliamentary leader for the Labour party in the Storting.
- Following the re-election of the Government, the Prime Minister on 20 October 2009 presented a new cabinet with several changes. The election strengthened the Labour party, while weakening the Socialist Left party, and the latter thus handed over one ministry to the former. They also gave up the Ministry of Finance for the Ministry of Children, Equality and Social inclusion. Another change in the composition of the government was the promotion of Karl Eirik Schjøtt-Pedersen from state secretary to Minister at the Office of the Prime Minister, thus adding to the number of ministers. In the Labour party, Minister of Health and Care Services Bjarne Håkon Hanssen and Minister of Trade and Industry Sylvia Brustad, both resigned from politics. The health portfolio was given to Anne-Grete Strøm-Erichsen, who was succeeded as Minister of Defence by Grete Faremo. The Trade and Industry portfolio was given to Trond Giske, who was succeeded as Minister of Culture by Anniken Huitfeldt (while the church portfolio was moved to the Ministry of Government Administration and Reform). Her former Ministry of Children of Equality was handed to the new Socialist Left party chairman Audun Lysbakken, who also took the portfolio of social inclusion. The former Socialist Left party chairman Kristin Halvorsen left the Ministry of Finance to become new Minister of Education, while the incumbent of that ministry, Bård Vegar Solhjell, resigned from the government to become parliamentary leader for the Socialist Left party in the Storting. Sigbjørn Johnsen became new Minister of Finance for the Labour party. The Ministry of Government Administration and Reform received the church portfolio, and Labour party MP Rigmor Aasrud was appointed minister. The outgoing Socialist Left party minister, Heidi Grande Røys, resigned from politics. To fill the vacancies left by the post-election (2 October) resignations of Andersen as Minister of Labour, and Pedersen as Minister of Fisheries and Coastal Affairs, new Labour party ministers were Lisbeth Berg-Hansen and Hanne Bjurstrøm. The Centre party kept their ministers, but there was a switch of ministries. Party leader Liv Signe Navarsete became Minister for Local Government and Regional Development, while Magnhild Meltveit Kleppa took Navarsete's former Ministry of Transport and Communications.
- On 4 March 2011, Terje Riis-Johansen resigned as Minister of Petroleum and Energy and was replaced by Ola Borten Moe.
- On 11 November 2011, Knut Storberget resigned as Minister of Justice, stating he wanted to spend more time with his children after troubling months following the 2011 Norway attacks. He was replaced by Grete Faremo, who was succeeded as Minister of Defence by Espen Barth Eide.
- On 5 March 2012, Audun Lysbakken left the government as Minister of Children, Equality and Social Inclusion and was replaced by Kristin Halvorsen until further notice
- On 23 March 2012, Erik Solheim and Tora Aasland retired. Both education portfolios were put under the responsibility of Halvorsen. Inga Marte Thorkildsen was appointed Minister of Children, Equality and Social Inclusion; Heikki Holmås was appointed Minister of International Development; and Solhjell was appointed Minister of the Environment.
- On 18 June 2012, Magnhild Meltveit Kleppa and Lars Peder Brekk resigned. Kleppa was succeeded as Minister of Transportation and Communication by Marit Arnstad, while Brekk was succeeded as Minister of Agriculture and Food by Trygve Slagsvold Vedum.
- On 21 September 2012, Hanne Bjurstrøm resigned, and was replaced as Minister of Labour by Anniken Huitfeldt. Her former Ministry of Culture was handed to Hadia Tajik, who thus became Norway's first Muslim member of government. At the same time Jonas Gahr Støre was appointed Minister of Health and Care Services, replacing Anne-Grete Strøm-Erichsen who was re-appointed as Minister of Defence (the position she held between 2005 and 2009). The Minister of Defence, Espen Barth Eide, succeeded Gahr Støre as Minister of Foreign Affairs.

== Change in ministry structure ==
From 1 January 2010 there was a change in the Ministry structure, following the September 2009 election and re-formation of the government. The Social Inclusion division of the Ministry of Labour and Social Inclusion was split between the Ministry of Children and Equality and the Ministry of Justice and Police. The Church Affairs division of the Ministry of Culture and Church Affairs was moved to the Ministry of Government Administration and Reform.

From 1 January 2012 the Ministry of Justice and Police was renamed as the Ministry of Justice and Emergency Planning

== Cabinet members ==
Portfolio	Minister	Took office	Left office	Party
Prime Minister	Jens Stoltenberg	17 October 2005	16 October 2013	Labour
Minister at the Office of the Prime Minister	Karl Eirik Schjøtt-Pedersen	20 October 2009	16 October 2013	Labour
Minister of Foreign Affairs	Jonas Gahr Støre	17 October 2005	21 September 2012	Labour
Minister of Foreign Affairs	Espen Barth Eide	21 September 2012	16 October 2013	Labour
Minister of Defence	Anne-Grete Strøm-Erichsen	17 October 2005	20 October 2009	Labour
Minister of Defence	Grete Faremo	20 October 2009	11 November 2011	Labour
Minister of Defence	Espen Barth Eide	11 November 2011	21 September 2012	Labour
Minister of Defence	Anne-Grete Strøm-Erichsen	21 September 2012	16 October 2013	Labour
Minister of Trade and Industry	Odd Eriksen	17 October 2005	29 September 2006	Labour
Minister of Trade and Industry	Dag Terje Andersen	29 September 2006	20 June 2008	Labour
Minister of Trade and Industry	Sylvia Brustad	20 June 2008	20 October 2009	Labour
Minister of Trade and Industry	Trond Giske	20 October 2009	16 October 2013	Labour
Minister of Government Administration and Reform	Heidi Grande Røys	17 October 2005	20 October 2009	Socialist Left
Minister of Government Administration and Reform	Rigmor Aasrud	20 October 2009	16 October 2013	Labour
Minister of Finance	Kristin Halvorsen	17 October 2005	20 October 2009	Socialist Left
Minister of Finance	Sigbjørn Johnsen	20 October 2009	16 October 2013	Labour
Minister of Local Government and Regional Development	Åslaug Haga	17 October 2005	21 September 2007	Centre
Minister of Local Government and Regional Development	Magnhild Meltveit Kleppa	21 September 2007	20 October 2009	Centre
Minister of Local Government and Regional Development	Liv Signe Navarsete	20 October 2009	16 October 2013	Centre
Minister of Health and Care Services	Sylvia Brustad	17 October 2005	20 June 2008	Labour
Minister of Health and Care Services	Bjarne Håkon Hanssen	20 June 2008	20 October 2009	Labour
Minister of Health and Care Services	Anne-Grete Strøm-Erichsen	20 October 2009	21 September 2012	Labour
Minister of Health and Care Services	Jonas Gahr Støre	21 September 2012	16 October 2013	Labour
Minister of Church Affairs	Trond Giske	17 October 2005	20 October 2009	Labour
Minister of Church Affairs	Rigmor Aasrud	20 October 2009	16 October 2013	Labour
Minister of Culture	Trond Giske	17 October 2005	20 October 2009	Labour
Minister of Culture	Anniken Huitfeldt	20 October 2009	21 September 2012	Labour
Minister of Culture	Hadia Tajik	21 September 2012	16 October 2013	Labour
Minister of Labour and Social Inclusion	Bjarne Håkon Hanssen	17 October 2005	20 June 2008	Labour
Minister of Labour and Social Inclusion	Dag Terje Andersen	20 June 2008	2 October 2009	Labour
Minister of Labour and Social Inclusion	Rigmor Aasrud	20 October 2009	20 December 2009	Labour
Minister of Labour and Social Inclusion	Hanne Bjurstrøm	21 December 2009	21 September 2012	Labour
Minister of Labour and Social Inclusion	Anniken Huitfeldt	21 September 2012	16 October 2013	Labour
Minister of Transport and Communications	Liv Signe Navarsete	17 October 2005	20 October 2009	Centre
Minister of Transport and Communications	Magnhild Meltveit Kleppa	20 October 2009	18 June 2012	Centre
Minister of Transport and Communications	Marit Arnstad	18 June 2012	16 October 2013	Centre
Minister of Fisheries and Coastal Affairs	Helga Pedersen	17 October 2005	2 October 2009	Labour
Minister of Fisheries and Coastal Affairs	Sylvia Brustad	2 October 2009	20 October 2009	Labour
Minister of Fisheries and Coastal Affairs	Lisbeth Berg-Hansen	20 October 2009	16 October 2013	Labour
Minister of International Development	Erik Solheim	17 October 2005	23 March 2012	Socialist Left
Minister of International Development	Heikki Holmås	23 March 2012	16 October 2013	Socialist Left
Minister of the Environment	Helen Bjørnøy	17 October 2005	18 October 2007	Socialist Left
Minister of the Environment	Erik Solheim	18 October 2007	23 March 2012	Socialist Left
Minister of the Environment	Bård Vegar Solhjell	23 March 2012	16 October 2013	Socialist Left
Minister of Agriculture and Food	Terje Riis-Johansen	17 October 2005	20 June 2008	Centre
Minister of Agriculture and Food	Lars Peder Brekk	20 June 2008	18 June 2012	Centre
Minister of Agriculture and Food	Trygve Slagsvold Vedum	18 June 2012	16 October 2013	Centre
Minister of Justice and the Police	Knut Storberget	17 October 2005	11 November 2011	Labour
Minister of Justice and the Police	Trond Giske	27 February 2009	30 March 2009	Labour
Minister of Justice and the Police	Grete Faremo	1 January 2011	31 March 2011	Labour
Minister of Justice and the Police	Grete Faremo	11 November 2011	16 October 2013	Labour
Minister of Children, Equality and Social Inclusion	Karita Bekkemellem	17 October 2005	18 October 2007	Labour
Minister of Children, Equality and Social Inclusion	Manuela Ramin-Osmundsen	18 October 2007	15 February 2008	Labour
Minister of Children, Equality and Social Inclusion	Anniken Huitfeldt	29 February 2008	20 October 2009	Labour
Minister of Children, Equality and Social Inclusion	Audun Lysbakken	20 October 2009	5 March 2012	Socialist Left
Minister of Children, Equality and Social Inclusion	Inga Marte Thorkildsen	23 March 2012	16 October 2013	Socialist Left
Minister of Petroleum and Energy	Odd Roger Enoksen	17 October 2005	21 September 2007	Centre
Minister of Petroleum and Energy	Åslaug Haga	21 September 2007	20 June 2008	Centre
Minister of Petroleum and Energy	Terje Riis-Johansen	20 June 2008	4 March 2011	Centre
Minister of Petroleum and Energy	Ola Borten Moe	4 March 2011	16 October 2013	Centre
Minister of Education	Øystein Djupedal	17 October 2005	18 October 2007	Socialist Left
Minister of Education	Bård Vegar Solhjell	18 October 2007	20 October 2009	Socialist Left
Minister of Education	Kristin Halvorsen	20 October 2009	16 October 2013	Socialist Left
Minister of Research and Higher Education	Øystein Djupedal	17 October 2005	18 October 2007	Socialist Left
Minister of Research and Higher Education	Tora Aasland	18 October 2007	23 March 2012	Socialist Left

== State Secretaries ==
Ministry	State Secretary	Period	Party
Office of the Prime Minister	Lars Erik Flatø	– 1 December 2006	Labour
Office of the Prime Minister	Bård Vegar Solhjell	– 18 October 2007	Socialist Left
Office of the Prime Minister	Hege Solbakken	– 3 March 2008	Centre
Office of the Prime Minister	Svein Fjellheim	– 30 November 2012	Labour
Office of the Prime Minister	Morten Wetland	– 31 December 2007	Labour
Office of the Prime Minister	Torbjørn Giæver Eriksen	– 11 June 2011	Labour
Office of the Prime Minister	Rita Skjærvik	(leave of absence 9 March 2006 – 30 November 2006) (leave of absence 12 January 2010 – 16 August 2010)	Labour
Office of the Prime Minister	Kjersti Markusson	22 October 2007 – 31 December 2009	Socialist Left
Office of the Prime Minister	Hilde Singsaas	1 December 2006 – 20 October 2009 (acting since 17 March)	Labour
Office of the Prime Minister	Anne Odden	1 June 2006 – 17 September 2006 (acting)	Labour
Office of the Prime Minister	Kjetil Hillestad	1 June 2006 – 17 September 2006 (acting)	Socialist Left
Office of the Prime Minister	Karl Eirik Schjøtt-Pedersen	1 December 2006 – 20 October 2009	Labour
Office of the Prime Minister	Snorre Wikstrøm	1 January 2008 – 15 September 2008; 20 October 2009 – (leave of absence 3 September 2012 – 21 April 2013)	Labour
Office of the Prime Minister	Per J. Jordal	3 March 2008 – 16 October 2009	Centre
Office of the Prime Minister	Jan-Erik Larsen	15 September 2008 – 16 October 2009	Labour
Office of the Prime Minister	Dagfinn Sundsbø	20 October 2009 – 28 September 2012	Centre
Office of the Prime Minister	Mina Gerhardsen	20 October 2009 – 1 February 2012	Labour
Office of the Prime Minister	Tor Brostigen	1 January 2010 –	Socialist Left
Office of the Prime Minister	Lotte Grepp Knutsen	13 January 2010 – 16 August 2010 (acting)	Labour
Office of the Prime Minister	Hans Kristian Amundsen	9 May 2011 – leave of absence 4 October 2012 – 12 November 2012	Labour
Office of the Prime Minister	Inger-Anne Ravlum	11 June 2011 –	Labour
Office of the Prime Minister	Halvard Ingebrigtsen	15 May 2013 – previously acting from 24 September 2012 – 21 April 2013	Labour
Office of the Prime Minister	Erik Lahnstein	28 September 2012 –	Centre
Office of the Prime Minister	Sindre Fossum Beyer	4 October 2012 – 4 November 2012 acting	Labour
Office of the Prime Minister	Mette Nord	23 November 2012 – 13 September 2013	Labour
Ministry of Foreign Affairs	Kjetil Skogrand	21 October 2005 – 17 November 2006	Labour
Ministry of Foreign Affairs	Raymond Johansen	28 October 2005 – 24 April 2009	Labour
Ministry of Foreign Affairs	Liv Monica Bargem Stubholt	7 November 2005 – 21 September 2007	Centre
Ministry of Foreign Affairs	Elisabeth Walaas	21 September 2007 – 4 January 2010	Labour
Ministry of Foreign Affairs	Gry Larsen	24 April 2009 – (leave of absence 9 August 2010 – 26 February 2011, 7 September 2013 –)	Labour
Ministry of Foreign Affairs	Erik Lahnstein	4 January 2010 – 3 February 2012	Centre
Ministry of Foreign Affairs	Espen Barth Eide	– 28 June 2010	Labour
Ministry of Foreign Affairs	Anne Margareth Stenhammer (International Development)	– 16 November 2007	Socialist Left
Ministry of Foreign Affairs	Håkon Gulbrandsen (International Development)	16 November 2007 – 20 November 2009	Socialist Left
Ministry of Foreign Affairs	Ingrid Fiskaa (International Development)	20 November 2009 –	Socialist Left
Ministry of Foreign Affairs	Torgeir Larsen	18 November 2011 –	Labour
Ministry of Foreign Affairs	Arvinn Gadgil (International Development)	13 April 2012 –	Socialist Left
Ministry of Foreign Affairs	Kathrine Raadim	7 September 2013 –	Labour
Ministry of Defence	Espen Barth Eide	– 28 June 2010	Labour
Ministry of Defence	Roger Ingebrigtsen	28 June 2010 – 21 September 2012	Labour
Ministry of Defence	Eirik Øwre Thorshaug	21 September 2012 –	Labour
Ministry of Industry and Trade	Frode Berge	21 October 2005 – 14 December 2007	Labour
Ministry of Industry and Trade	Karin Yrvin	21 October 2005 – 29 September 2006	Labour
Ministry of Industry and Trade	Rikke Lind	26 January 2007 – 4 May 2012 (leave of absence 7 January 2008 – 1 August 2008)	Labour
Ministry of Industry and Trade	Øyvind Slåke	14 December 2007 – 2 October 2009	Labour
Ministry of Industry and Trade	Annelene Svingen	7 January 2008 – 1 July 2008 (acting)	Labour
Ministry of Industry and Trade	Arvid Libak	20 June 2008 – 12 September 2008	Labour
Ministry of Industry and Trade	Fride Solbakken	2 October 2009 – 20 October 2009 (acting)	Labour
Ministry of Industry and Trade	Pål Julius Skogholt	20 November 2009 – 4 February 2011	Socialist Left
Ministry of Industry and Trade	Jeanette Iren Moen	15 May 2012 –	Labour
Ministry of Industry and Trade	Roger Ingebrigtsen	21 September 2012 – 7 December 2012	Labour
Ministry of Industry and Trade	Kristin Maurstad	7 December 2012 – 28 April 2013 (acting)	Labour
Ministry of Industry and Trade	Trygve Svensson	7 May 2013 –	Labour
Ministry of Government Administration, Reform and Church Affairs	Wenche Lyngholm	21 October 2005 – 20 October 2009	Socialist Left
Ministry of Government Administration, Reform and Church Affairs	Halvard Ingebrigtsen	20 October 2009 – (acting in the Office of the Prime Minister 24 September 2012 – 5 May 2013)	Labour
Ministry of Government Administration, Reform and Church Affairs	Raimo Valle	20 October 2009 – 24 August 2012	Labour
Ministry of Government Administration, Reform and Church Affairs	Inger-Anne Ravlum	23 October 2009 – 11 June 2011	Labour
Ministry of Government Administration, Reform and Church Affairs	Tone-Helen Toften	30 September 2011 – 1 October 2013	Labour
Ministry of Government Administration, Reform and Church Affairs	Jon Reidar Øyan	11 November 2011 – 31 December 2011 (acting)	Labour
Ministry of Government Administration, Reform and Church Affairs	Ragnhild Vassvik	7 September 2012 –	Labour
Ministry of Finance	Roger Schjerva	17 October 2005 – (leave of absence 18 May 2009 – 31 July 2009)	Socialist Left
Ministry of Finance	Geir Axelsen	– 20 October 2009	Labour
Ministry of Finance	Roger Sandum	– 20 October 2009	Socialist Left
Ministry of Finance	Bjørn Arild Gram	– 12 October 2007 (leave of absence 6 August 2007 – 30 September 2007)	Centre
Ministry of Finance	Kjersti Markusson	21 October 2005 – 22 October 2007	Socialist Left
Ministry of Finance	Sigrid Hjørnegård	6 August 2007 – 3 September 2007 (acting)	Centre
Ministry of Finance	Ole Morten Geving	12 October 2007 – 17 December 2010	Centre
Ministry of Finance	Henriette Westhrin	18 October 2007 – 20 October 2009	Socialist Left
Ministry of Finance	Bernt Sverre Mehammer	18 May 2009 – 31 July 2009 (acting)	Socialist Left
Ministry of Finance	Hilde Singsaas	20 October 2009 –	Labour
Ministry of Finance	Kjetil Lund	20 October 2009 –	Labour
Ministry of Finance	Morten Søberg	17 December 2010 –	Centre
Ministry of Local Government and Regional Development	Inge Bartnes	– 21 September 2007	Centre
Ministry of Local Government and Regional Development	Guri Størvold	– 21 September 2007; 20 October 2009 – 3 February 2012 (leave of absence 6 March 2011 – 2 October 2011)	Centre
Ministry of Local Government and Regional Development	Dag-Henrik Sandbakken	21 October 2005 – 1 February 2013	Centre
Ministry of Local Government and Regional Development	Janne Sjelmo Nordås	2 November 2007 – 30 September 2009 (leave of absence 10 August 2009 – 15 September 2009)	Centre
Ministry of Local Government and Regional Development	Lars Erik Bartnes	10 August 2009 – 15 September 2009 (acting)	Centre
Ministry of Local Government and Regional Development	Hege Solbakken	20 October 2009 –	Centre
Ministry of Local Government and Regional Development	Erlend Fuglum	3 February 2012 –	Centre
Ministry of Local Government and Regional Development	Anne Beathe Tvinnereim	19 October 2012 – (acting since 14 February 2011)	Centre
Ministry of Local Government and Regional Development	Eli Blakstad	11 January 2013 –	Centre
Ministry of Health and Care Services	Rigmor Aasrud	21 October 2005 – 30 September 2009	Labour
Ministry of Health and Care Services	Wegard Harsvik	21 October 2005 – 3 December 2007	Labour
Ministry of Health and Care Services	Arvid Libak	13 October 2006 – 20 June 2008	Labour
Ministry of Health and Care Services	Kari Henriksen	3 December 2007 – 3 April 2009	Labour
Ministry of Health and Care Services	Dagfinn Sundsbø	20 June 2008 – 20 October 2009	Centre
Ministry of Health and Care Services	Ellen Birgitte Pedersen	27 June 2008 – 20 October 2009	Socialist Left
Ministry of Health and Care Services	Ketil Lindseth	27 February 2009 – 20 October 2009	Labour
Ministry of Health and Care Services	Tone-Helen Toften	20 October 2009 – 30 September 2011	Labour
Ministry of Health and Care Services	Roger Ingebrigtsen	20 October 2009 – 28 June 2010	Labour
Ministry of Health and Care Services	Ragnhild Mathisen	23 October 2009 – 7 September 2012	Labour
Ministry of Health and Care Services	Robin Kåss	25 June 2010 – (leave of absence 3 March 2011 – 11 May 2011)	Labour
Ministry of Health and Care Services	Tord Dale	3 March 2011 – 11 May 2011 (acting)	Labour
Ministry of Health and Care Services	Lotte Grepp Knutsen	27 December 2011 – 20 April 2012	Labour
Ministry of Health and Care Services	Kjell Erik Øie	8 June 2012 –	Labour
Ministry of Health and Care Services	Nina Tangnæs Grønvold	28 September 2012 –	Labour
Ministry of Culture	Randi Øverland	21 October 2005 – 30 November 2007	Labour
Ministry of Culture	Mette Gundersen	21 October 2005 – (leave of absence 1 October 2006 – 3 June 2007)	Labour
Ministry of Culture	Halvard Ingebrigtsen	1 June 2007 – 20 October 2009 (acting since 12 October 2006)	Labour
Ministry of Culture	Wegard Harsvik	3 December 2007 – 20 October 2009	Labour
Ministry of Culture	Lotte Grepp Knutsen	20 October 2009 – 27 December 2011 (leave of absence 7 March 2011 – 27 December 2011)	Labour
Ministry of Culture	Lubna Jaffery	23 October 2009 – 23 March 2012	Labour
Ministry of Culture	Roger Solheim	13 January 2010 – 16 August 2010 (acting) 7 March 2011 – 31 December 2011 (acting)	Labour
Ministry of Culture	Mina Gerhardsen	1 February 2012 –	Labour
Ministry of Culture	Kjersti Stenseng	15 May 2012 – 1 October 2013 (previously acting from 1 November 2011 – 31 December 2011)	Labour
Ministry of Labour	Jan-Erik Støstad	21 October 2005 – 23 November 2012	Labour
Ministry of Labour	Libe S. Rieber-Mohn	21 October 2005 – 20 October 2009	Labour
Ministry of Labour	Laila Gustavsen	21 October 2005 – 30 September 2009	Labour
Ministry of Labour	Berit Oskal Eira	28 October 2005 – 26 October 2007	Independent
Ministry of Labour	Raimo Valle	26 October 2007 – 20 October 2009	Labour
Ministry of Labour	Gina Lund	20 October 2009 – 15 February 2013	Labour
Ministry of Labour	Norvald Mo	23 November 2012 –	Labour
Ministry of Labour	Cecilie Bjelland	1 March 2013 –	Labour
Ministry of Transport and Communications	Steinulf Tungesvik	21 October 2005 – 29 February 2008; 13 February 2012 – 1 April 2012 (acting)	Centre
Ministry of Transport and Communications	Erik Lahnstein	19 October 2007 – 4 January 2010 (acting 17 October 2006 – 15 December 2006); 3 February 2012 – 28 September 2012	Centre
Ministry of Transport and Communications	Hege Solbakken	3 March 2008 – 20 October 2009 (leave of absence 29 September 2008 – 29 March 2009)	Centre
Ministry of Transport and Communications	Guri Størvold	15 September 2008 – 20 October 2009 (acting)	Centre
Ministry of Transport and Communications	Geir Pollestad	8 October 2008 – 30 September 2009; 28 September 2012 – 1 October 2013	Centre
Ministry of Transport and Communications	Lars Erik Bartnes	20 October 2009 – (leave of absence 6 February 2012 – 15 April 2012)	
Ministry of Fisheries	Vidar Ulriksen	21 October 2005 – 14 January 2011	Labour
Ministry of Fisheries	Hans Kristian Amundsen	14 January 2011 – 9 May 2011	Labour
Ministry of Fisheries	Kristine Gramstad	13 May 2011 – 8 February 2013	Labour
Ministry of Fisheries	Hugo Bjørnstad	1 March 2013 –	Labour
Ministry of the Environment	Henriette Westhrin	– 18 October 2007; 30 March 2012 –	Socialist Left
Ministry of the Environment	Heidi Sørensen	18 October 2007 – 27 April 2012	Socialist Left
Ministry of the Environment	Ketil Raknes	27 April 2012 – (leave of absence 10 September 2013 – )	Socialist Left
Ministry of the Environment	Ellen Øseth	1 March 2013 –	Socialist Left
Ministry of the Environment	Line Gaare Paulsen	6 September 2013 –	Socialist Left
Ministry of Agriculture	Ola T. Heggem	28 October 2005 – 30 September 2011	Centre
Ministry of Agriculture	Harald O. Buttedahl	21 October 2011 – 7 June 2013	Centre
Ministry of Agriculture	Erlend T. Grimstad	7 June 2013 –	Centre
Ministry of Justice and Public Security	Anne Rygh Pedersen	21 October 2005 – 9 February 2007	Labour
Ministry of Justice and Public Security	Terje Moland Pedersen	21 October 2005 – 20 January 2012 (leave of absence 17 April 2009 – 10 August 2009)	Labour
Ministry of Justice and Public Security	Astri Aas-Hansen	9 February 2007 – 26 April 2013	Labour
Ministry of Justice and Public Security	Eirik Øwre Thorshaug	29 April 2009 – 10 August 2009 (acting); 1 January 2011 – 31 March 2011 (acting) 16 December 2011 – 7 September 2012 (acting since 19 September 2011, leave of absence 2 February 2012 – 30 June 2012)	Labour
Ministry of Justice and Public Security	Pål Lønseth	23 October 2009 –	Labour
Ministry of Justice and Public Security	Kristin Bergersen	21 September 2012 – (acting since 2 February 2012)	Labour
Ministry of Justice and Public Security	Pål Martin Sand	2 May 2013 –	Labour
Ministry of Children and Equality	Kjell Erik Øie	21 October 2005 – 27 March 2009	Labour
Ministry of Children and Equality	Krishna Chudasama	28 October 2005 – 1 December 2006	Labour
Ministry of Children and Equality	Lotte Grepp Knutsen	27 March 2009 – 20 October 2009	Labour
Ministry of Children and Equality	Henriette Westhrin	20 October 2009 – 30 March 2012	Socialist Left
Ministry of Children and Equality	Kirsti Bergstø	26 November 2010 – 5 March 2012	Socialist Left
Ministry of Children and Equality	Roger Sandum	5 March 2012 – 23 March 2012	Socialist Left
Ministry of Children and Equality	Ahmad Ghanizadeh	23 March 2012 –	Socialist Left
Ministry of Petroleum and Energy	Anita Utseth	21 October 2005 – 21 September 2007	Centre
Ministry of Petroleum and Energy	Liv Monica Bargem Stubholt	21 September 2007 – 27 March 2009	Centre
Ministry of Petroleum and Energy	Guri Størvold	21 September 2007 – 20 June 2008	Centre
Ministry of Petroleum and Energy	Geir Pollestad	20 June 2008 – 8 October 2008	Centre
Ministry of Petroleum and Energy	Robin Kåss	8 October 2008 – 25 June 2010	Labour
Ministry of Petroleum and Energy	Sigrid Hjørnegård	27 March 2009 – 4 March 2011	Centre
Ministry of Petroleum and Energy	Per Rune Henriksen	3 September 2010 – 7 May 2013	Labour
Ministry of Petroleum and Energy	Eli Blakstad	11 March 2011 – 28 September 2012	Centre
Ministry of Petroleum and Energy	Ane Hansdatter Kismul	28 September 2012 –	Centre
Ministry of Education and Research	Åge Ronald Rosnes	– 3 September 2006	Socialist Left
Ministry of Education and Research	Lisbet Rugtvedt	– 9 December 2011	Socialist Left
Ministry of Education and Research	Per Botolf Maurseth	1 September 2006 – 18 October 2007	Socialist Left
Ministry of Education and Research	Jens Revold	18 October 2007 – 13 March 2009	Socialist Left
Ministry of Education and Research	Åsa Elvik	13 March 2009 – 20 October 2009	Socialist Left
Ministry of Education and Research	Roger Sandum	20 October 2009 –	Socialist Left
Ministry of Education and Research	Kyrre Lekve	20 October 2009 – 7 May 2012	Socialist Left
Ministry of Education and Research	Elisabet Dahle	9 December 2011 –	Socialist Left
Ministry of Education and Research	Ragnhild Setsaas	7 May 2012 –	Socialist Left
