= Halvard Ingebrigtsen =

Norwegian politician (born 1970)

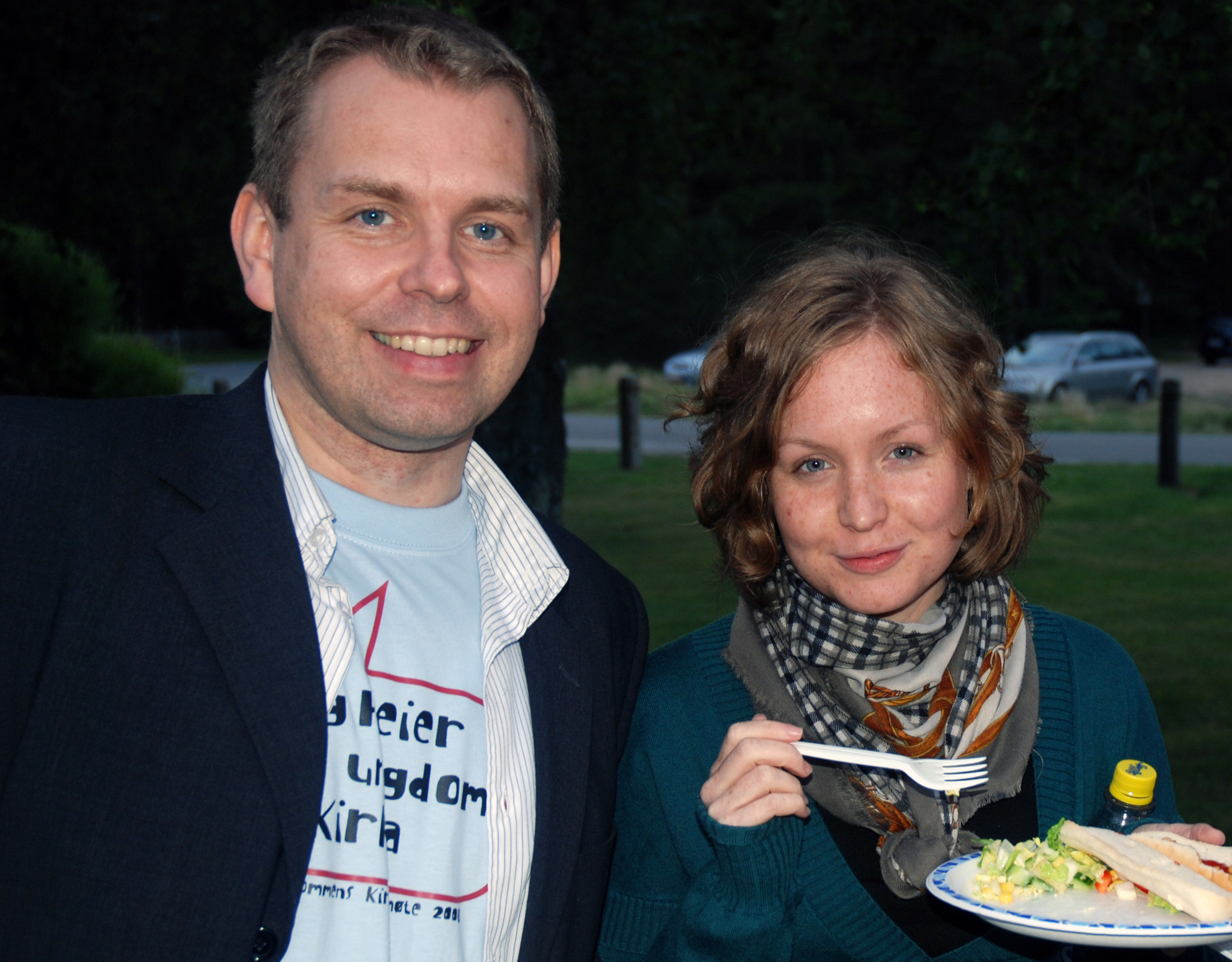
Halvard Ingebrigtsen (left), 2008.

Halvard Ingebrigtsen (born 23 September 1970) is a Norwegian politician for the Labour Party.

He finished his secondary education in Trondheim in 1989. While he served through his compulsory military service from 1990 to 1991 he was also a national board member of the Workers' Youth League and deputy leader in Sør-Trøndelag. For the next year he led the organization in Trondheim. Between 1992 and 1995 he was deputy leader, then leader of the Youth against the EU. From 1993 he was also a central board member of Nei til EU. He served one final year as leader of the Workers' Youth League in Sør-Trøndelag from 1995 to 1996.

From 1996 to 1998 he was employed by the Workers' Youth League as office manager, and from 1998 to 2002 he was its secretary-general. During those years he was also a national board member of the Labour Party. From 2003 to 2005 he was a political adviser for the Labour Party parliamentary caucus.

His first elected political position came as a member of Trondheim city council from 1995 to 1999. In 2005 he was appointed to Stoltenberg's Second Cabinet, as political adviser in the Ministry of Culture and Church Affairs. He was then State Secretary there from 2006 to 2009 (acting 2006–2007), then in the Ministry of Trade and Industry until Stoltenberg's Second Cabinet fell in October 2013. He was also an acting State Secretary in the Office of the Prime Minister.

He has also been a board member of the Norwegian Children and Youth Council from 1997 to 1998. In 2012 he was also appointed as the Norwegian vice-governor in the European Bank for Reconstruction and Development. He resides in Lørenskog where he since 2012 leads the local Labour Party chapter. In 2013 he was elected as a deputy representative to the Parliament of Norway for the term 2013–2017, representing the constituency of Akershus.

Between 2019 and 2021, he served as the Viken County Commissioner for Finance and Administration.

In 2021, he was appointed state secretary at the Ministry of Trade and Fisheries. He held the position until being appointed Chief of Staff to prime minister Jonas Gahr Støre in March 2024, succeeding Kristine Kallset.

Party political offices
Preceded by Trond Jensrud	Secretary-general of the Workers' Youth League; 1998–2002	Succeeded by Geir Waage
