= Eli Blakstad =

Norwegian politician (born 1962)

Eli Blakstad (born 10 August 1962) is a Norwegian politician for the Centre Party.

She finished her secondary education in 1981, and graduated from Jønsberg Agricultural School in 1982 and Telemark University College in 1985. She was hired as an accountant in Sør-Fron in 1985, and has been a farmer since 1990. From 2001 to 2011 she was the chief executive officer of Peer Gynt AS.

She was a board member of Norges Bygdeungdomslag from 1983 to 1984, and the first female leader of the organization from 1986 to 1988. During her leadership she was also a board member of the Norwegian Agrarian Association. She was a board member of the Royal Norwegian Society for Development from 2002 to 2006, of Lillehammer University College from 2002 to 2011 (deputy during parts of this period), Mjøsenergi Invest from 2006 to 2007, Innovation Norway from 2007 to 2010, Eidsiva Marked from 2008 to 2011 and Nortura in 2009. She has also been involved in tourism, among others as a member of the strategic council for tourism development in the Confederation of Norwegian Enterprise from 2008 to 2010.

She was a member of Oppland county council from 1995 to 2007, and chaired Oppland Centre Party from 2001 to 2006. In 1997 and 2005 she was a member of the party platform committee. In 2011 she was appointed State Secretary in the Ministry of Petroleum and Energy as a part of Stoltenberg's Second Cabinet. She was replaced in 2012. Soon after she was elected new deputy leader of No to the EU. In early 2013 she was redrafted into Stoltenberg's Second Cabinet as State Secretary in the Ministry of Local Government and Regional Development. The cabinet fell in October 2013.
