= Lotte Grepp Knutsen =

Norwegian politician

Lotte Grepp Knutsen (born 10 September 1973) is a Norwegian politician for the Labour Party.

In March 2008 she was appointed as a political adviser in the Ministry of Children, Equality and Social Inclusion as a part of Stoltenberg's Second Cabinet. She was promoted to State Secretary after one year. In October 2009 she changed ministry to the Ministry of Culture where she worked throughout the year. She had another spell as State Secretary in the Ministry of Health and Care Services from December 2011 to April 2012. She also served as a deputy representative to the Parliament of Norway from Oslo during the term 2009–2013.

She is a great-granddaughter of Kyrre and Rachel Grepp.
