= Sigrid Hjørnegård =

Norwegian politician (born 1965)

Sigrid Hjørnegård (born 8 October 1965) is a Norwegian politician for the Centre Party.

She finished her secondary education in Ås in 1984, and graduated from Mære Agricultural School in 1986 and the Norwegian College of Agriculture in 1990. She worked part-time as a research assistant from 1990 to 1992. She was a board member of Norges Bygdeungdomslag from 1986 to 1988, and leader from 1990 to 1992.

From 1988 to 1990 she was a board member of the Norwegian Children and Youth Council. She worked for the Norwegian Agrarian Association locally in Akershus from 1992 to 1996, and nationally as information director from 1996 to 2005. In the Agrarian Association she was a supervisory council member from 1987 to 1988 and board member from 1990 to 1992. From 1992 to 1993 she was a deputy board member of Nei til EU, and chaired the Akershus branch of the organization. Since 1997 she has been a deputy board member of the Norwegian College of Agriculture/Norwegian University of Life Sciences, and since 2004 she is a board member of Landbrukets Utredningskontor.

She has been a member of Ås municipal council. In 2005, when Stoltenberg's Second Cabinet assumed office, she was appointed as a political adviser in the Ministry of Agriculture and Food. She was a political adviser in Ministry of Petroleum and Energy from 2008 to 2009, and State Secretary in the same ministry from 2009 to 2011.
