= Tor Brostigen =

Norwegian politician

Tor Brostigen (born 6 August 1957) is a Norwegian politician for the Socialist Left Party.

He finished secondary school in 1976, and worked as a firefighter in Oslo from 1978 to 1988. From 1989 to 1995 he worked in Nei til EU, and from 1998 to 2009 he was an adviser in the Socialist Left Party. On 1 January 2010 he was hired as State Secretary in the Norwegian Office of the Prime Minister.
