= Elisabeth Walaas =

Norwegian civil servant, diplomat and politician

Elisabeth Walaas (born 27 April 1956) is a Norwegian civil servant, diplomat and politician for the Labour Party.

She took her examen artium in 1975 in Tønsberg, and the cand.philol. degree in 1983 at the University of Bergen. She worked as a school teacher before and after graduating.

She served as a deputy representative to the Norwegian Parliament from Hordaland during the term 1989–1993. From 1983 to 1990 she was a member of Bergen city council. She was appointed a political advisor, from 1987 to 1989 in the Ministry of Culture and Science and from 1990 to 1992 in the Ministry of Foreign Affairs.

In 1992 she was hired as a bureaucrat in the Ministry of Foreign Affairs. In 1997 she was promoted to head of department, from 2001 to 2004 she was a diplomat in Brussels and in 2005 she was appointed Norwegian ambassador to Croatia. In September 2007, during the second cabinet Stoltenberg, Walaas was appointed State Secretary in the Ministry of Foreign Affairs.
