= Erik Lahnstein =

Norwegian politician

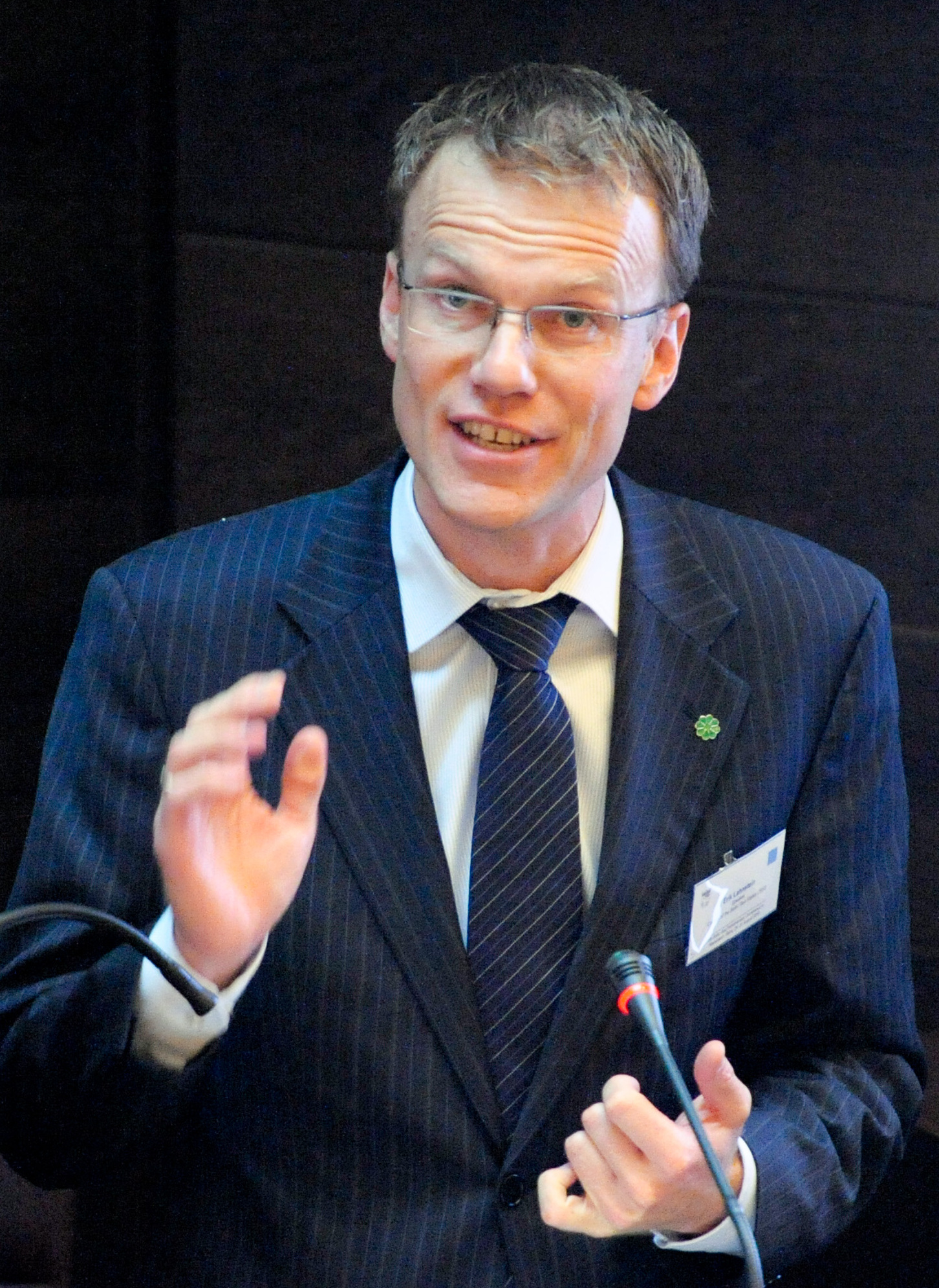
Erik Lahnstein

Erik Lahnstein (born 15 June 1972) is a Norwegian politician for the Centre Party.

He was active in the Centre Youth from 1989, and was a board member of the Norwegian Children and Youth Council from 1991 to 1993. He took his education at the University of Oslo, with a cand.mag. degree in 1996, then a master's degree in 1997. He worked for the Norwegian Shipowners' Association from 1998 to 2005, then for Marut from September to October 2005.

When Stoltenberg's Second Cabinet assumed office following the 2005 election, he was appointed political advisor in the Ministry of Transport and Communications. In October 2007 he was promoted to State Secretary. After a period as State Secretary in the Ministry of Foreign Affairs from 2010 to 2012, he returned to the Ministry of Transport and Communications in 2012. Before the end of the year, he had transferred once again to the Office of the Prime Minister.

He is the son of former party leader Anne Enger Lahnstein, and nephew of Inger S. Enger.
