= Snorre Wikstrøm =

Norwegian politician

Snorre Wikstrøm (born 15 March 1972) is a Norwegian politician for the Labour Party.

He enrolled at the University of Oslo in 1990 and graduated with the cand.mag. degree in 1995. He was a deputy member of Hedmark county council from 1991 to 1999, leader of the Workers' Youth League in Hedmark from 1992 to 1994 and central board member from 1992 to 1998. He worked as a secretary for Sosialdemokrater mot EU from August to December 1994 and as secretary to the Oslo City Councillor for Labour and Social Affairs from September to December 1996.

From 1999 to 2009 he worked as a campaign manager, adviser and secretary for the Norwegian Labour Party, except for the period January to September 2008 when he was acting State Secretary in the Norwegian Office of the Prime Minister. In October 2009 he got the latter job on a permanent basis.
