= Bernt Sverre Mehammer =

Norwegian economist and politician

Bernt Sverre Mehammer (born 1969) is a Norwegian economist and politician for the Socialist Left Party.

Born in Oslo, he started his organizational career in the godtemplar youth and Juvente Norway in the 1980s. He minored in sociology at the University of Oslo in 1992, and graduated with the cand.oecon. degree in 1995.

From 1995 to 1999 he worked as information director in the Norwegian Policy Network on Alcohol and Drugs. He worked in the consultant firm Prosa from 1999 to 2000, later chairing its board for five years. In 2000 he became a finance policy adviser for the Socialist Left Party. In the summer of 2009 he served as a State Secretary in the Ministry of Finance, as part of Stoltenberg's Second Cabinet.

He has also been a board member of the NKI Foundation.
