= Guri Størvold =

Norwegian politician

Guri Størvold (born 27 May 1976) is a Norwegian politician for the Centre Party.

She served as a member of the municipal council of Steinkjer Municipality from 1991 to 1995. She finished her secondary education in Steinkjer in 1995 and minored in political science in 2000. She was the leader of Norges Bygdeungdomslag from 1996 to 1999, and also board member of the Norwegian Agrarian Association during the same period.

From 1999 to 2000, during the Bondevik's First Cabinet Størvold was a political advisor in the Ministry of Local Government and Regional Development. She was also a central board member of the Centre Youth from 1999 to 2002. She worked as a researcher for the television program Redaksjon 21 from 2000 to 2001 and adviser for the Centre Party parliamentary group from 2001 to 2005.

When Stoltenberg's Second Cabinet assumed office following the 2005 elections, Størvold was appointed State Secretary in the Ministry of Local Government and Regional Development. In late 2007 she changed to the Ministry of Petroleum and Energy. She left in June 2008. She joined the Ministry of Transport and Communications as acting State Secretary in September 2008, then returned to the Ministry of Local Government and Regional Development from October 2009 to February 2012.

She was soon hired in the communications firm Zynk. She resides in Asker Municipality.
