= Roger Ingebrigtsen =

Norwegian journalist and politician

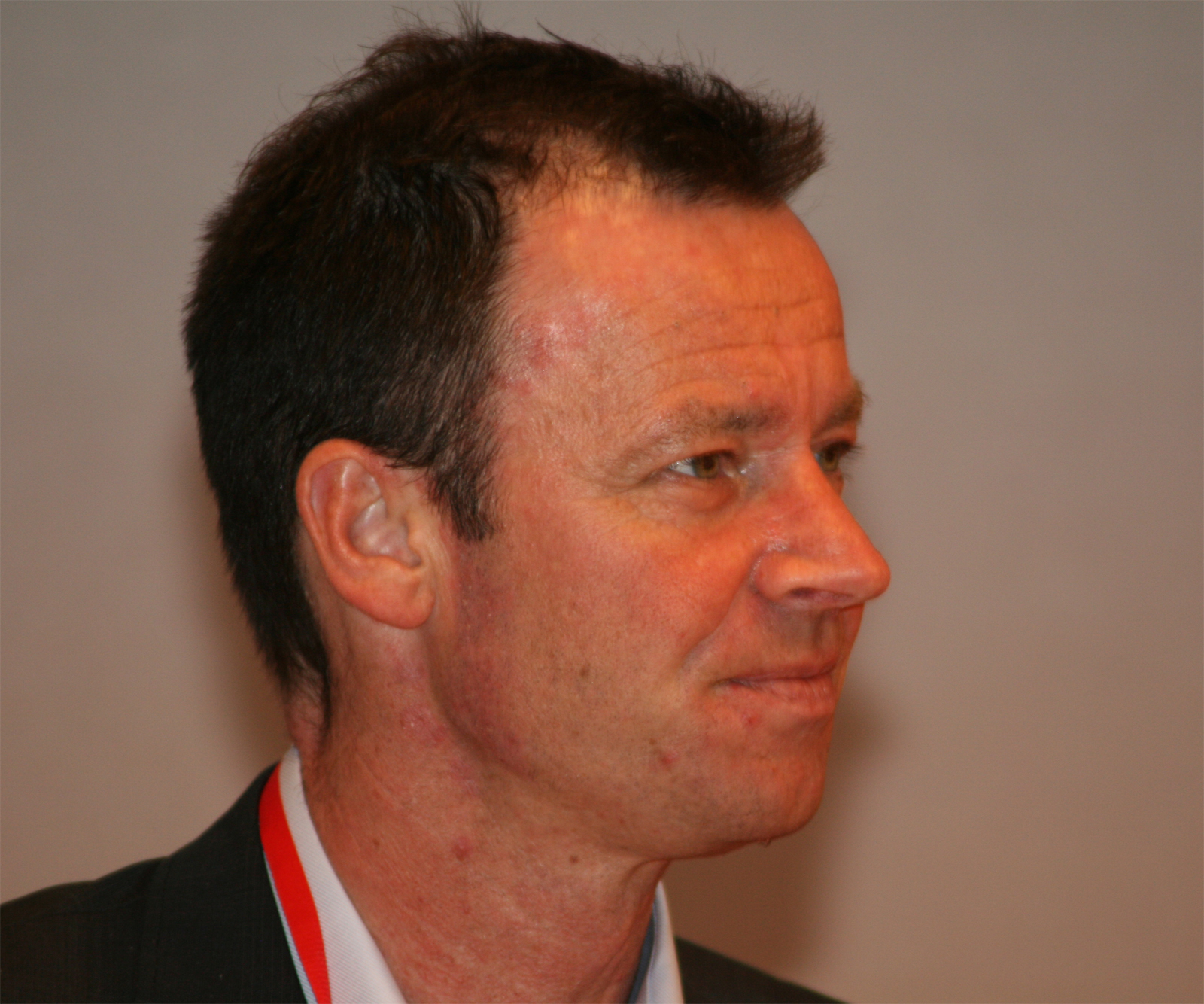
Roger Ingebrigtsen

Roger Ingebrigtsen (born 8 September 1966) is a Norwegian journalist and politician for the Labour Party. He is best known as State Secretary in Stoltenberg's First and Stoltenberg's Second Cabinet (2000–2001 and 2009–2012) and county councillor in Troms County Municipality (2003–2006). He has also worked as a journalist in Dagbladet and Verdens Gang, and was the news editor in Nordlys. He has also been information or communications director in the Norwegian Centre for Integrated Care and Telemedicine, Hurtigruten and Tromsø 2018.

== Career ==
In his early career, Ingebrigtsen was a political adviser for the Labour Party parliamentary group from 1989 to 1991. In 1991 he had a short stint as a journalist in Dagbladet. He also served as a deputy representative to the Parliament of Norway from Troms during the term 1989–1993. In total he met during 9 days of parliamentary session. During Brundtland's Third Cabinet, from 1992 to 1996, Ingebrigtsen was a political adviser in the Ministry of Local Government and Work Affairs.

In 1996 he was hired as a journalist in Verdens Gang. He went on to become information director in the Norwegian Centre for Integrated Care and Telemedicine in 1998, and in 1999 he was the news editor in Nordlys. During Stoltenberg's First Cabinet, from 2000 to 2001, he was appointed as a State Secretary in the Ministry of Culture. He was then communications director for Hurtigruten from 2001 to 2003, before re-entering politics as county councillor in the county government of Troms County Municipality from 2003 to 2006. From 2007 to 2009 he worked as strategy and communications director of Tromsø 2018. He also chaired Tromsø Labour Party from 2006 to 2010, and the Norwegian Arctic Philharmonic Orchestra from 2009. In 2009 he was appointed to Stoltenberg's Second Cabinet as a State Secretary in the Ministry of Health and Care Services. He changed to the Ministry of Defence in 2010 and the Trade and Industry in September 2012.

== Resignation from political positions ==
On 30 November 2012, he resigned his position as State Secretary after it was revealed that he in 2004 had a sexual affair with a fellow party member, 20 years his junior, who was 17 years old at the time the affair began. He also withdrew from the nomination process to the 2013 Norwegian parliamentary election where he had been competing with Martin Henriksen for the top position on the Labour Party list in Troms. The nomination committee had nominated Henriksen for the first ballot spot, Tove Karoline Knutsen for the second and Ingebrigtsen for the third spot. The circumstance that the offended woman had first taken her revelation to Tonje Brenna, a party official who lives together with Henriksen, led to published speculations that the information had been deployed politically in favor of Henriksen's candidacy.

Days after the story broke, a colleague of Ingebrigtsen stated that he had notified the Labour party about the affair one year before, but nothing had been done. On 4 December, yet another former youth politician came out and accused Ingebrigtsen of pressuring her into sexual relations. In response to these later accusations, the leader of the Labour party representatives in the Troms county parliament, Kristin Røymo declared Ingebrigtsen persona non grata, saying that he was "not welcome" back into the party. On 6 December Roger Ingebrigtsen resigned from all posts locally, thereby effectively ending his political career altogether.
