= Roger Sandum =

Norwegian politician

Roger Østlie Sandum (born 10 May 1970) is a Norwegian politician for the Socialist Left Party.

Born in Rælingen, he has secondary education as a photographer at Strømmen. He was hired as such in Romerikes Blad in 1992, and later became journalist. He was a member of Akershus county council from 1991 to 1995, and from 2000 to 2005 he was a secretary and advisor for the Socialist Left Party parliamentary group.

When Stoltenberg's Second Cabinet assumed office following the 2005 election, he was appointed State Secretary in the Ministry of Finance. From 2009 he is State Secretary in the Ministry of Education and Research. In March 2012 he also doubled, briefly, as State Secretary in the Ministry of Children, Equality and Social Inclusion.
