= Inger-Anne Ravlum =

Norwegian politician

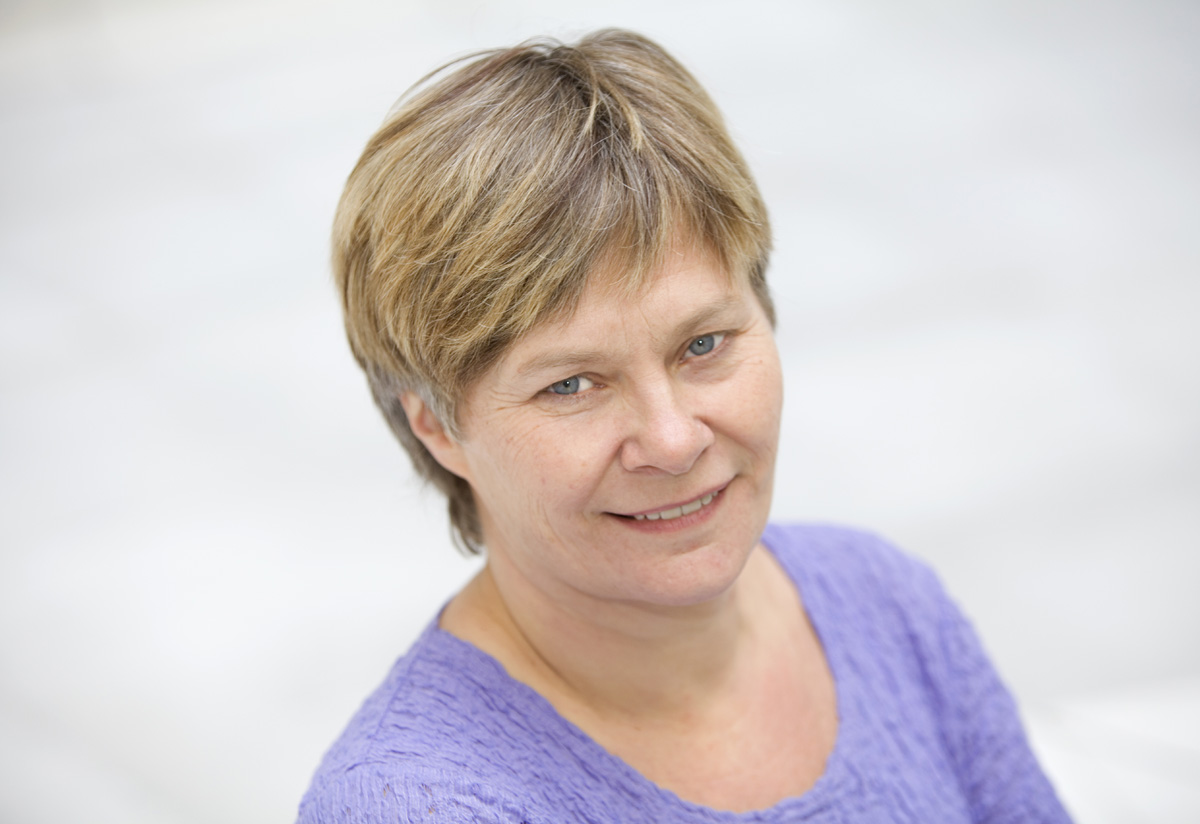
Inger-Anne Ravlum.

Inger-Anne Ravlum (born 22 February 1962) is a Norwegian civil servant, research director and politician for the Labour Party.

She started her career as a journalist in Arbeiderungdommen in 1984, going on to the Labour Party paper Aktuelt Perspektiv in 1985. After working briefly as secretary for the Labour Party caucus in Oslo city council in 1987, she went on to work two years as a secretary in the party. In 1990 she was appointed to Brundtland's Third Cabinet as a political adviser to the Minister of Development Cooperation. From 1992 to 1994 she was a journalist in A-pressens Osloredaksjon and held a small research fellowship at the Fridtjof Nansen Institute. From 1994 to 1996, she was back in Brundtland's Third Cabinet as a political adviser to Prime Minister Gro Harlem Brundtland herself.

When Brundtland retired in 1996, Ravlum finally graduated with the cand.polit. degree and became a researcher at the Institute of Transport Economics. She advanced through the hierarchy, becoming research director in 2005. One year later she became a head of department in the Ministry of Government Administration and Reform.

In 2009 she was appointed to Stoltenberg's Second Cabinet as a State Secretary in the Ministry of Government Administration and Reform. In 2011 she changed job, to State Secretary in the Office of the Prime Minister. She remained such until Stoltenberg's Second Cabinet fell in October 2013. She was promptly hired as the new managing director of the Norwegian Agricultural Economics Research Institute.
