= Kjersti Markusson =

Norwegian politician (born 1955)

Kjersti Markusson (born 13 April 1955) is a Norwegian politician for the Socialist Left Party.

She has spent most of her professional career in the school system, and has been active in the trade union Union of Education Norway. She was first elected to the municipal council of Evenes Municipality in 1991, and has been re-elected several times. She has also been a member of Nordland county council.

When the second cabinet Stoltenberg assumed office following the 2005 election, she was appointed State Secretary in the Ministry of Finance. In October 2007 she changed to the Office of the Prime Minister.
