= Kjell Erik Øie =

Norwegian politician

State Secretary in the Ministry of Health and Care Services
- In office 2012–2013

State Secretary in the Ministry of Children and Equality
- In office 2005–2009

deputy representative to the Parliament of Norway
- In office 2005–2009

Personal details
- Born: 2 March 1960
- Political party: Labour Party

Kjell Erik Øie (born 2 March 1960) is a Norwegian politician for the Labour Party.

He graduated as a nurse from the nurse college in Sør-Trøndelag in 1984, and worked as a nurse at Radiumhospitalet from 1984 to 1988. He then worked one year in a committee for homosexuals' health. From 1987 to 1991, he chaired the gay rights organization Det Norske Forbund av 1948, and from 1988 to 1993, he lobbied for the Partnership Act.

He worked in Oslo Municipality from 1989 to 1992, at the treatment center T5 from 1992 to 1995, and in the Norwegian Board of Health Supervision from 1995 to 2000. He was also a board member of the Norwegian Competence Center for Equality from 1997 to 2000 and the Norwegian Nurses Organisation from 1998 to 1999. From 1999 to 2003, he served one term as an elected member of Oslo city council. In Stoltenberg's First Cabinet, from 2000 to 2001, he was a political adviser in the Ministry of Children and Family Affairs.

When Stoltenberg's Second Cabinet assumed office following the 2005 elections, Øie was appointed State Secretary in the Ministry of Children and Equality. He left office in March 2009. He also served as a deputy representative to the Parliament of Norway from Oslo during the term 2005–2009. In total, he met during 13 days of parliamentary session. In June 2012, he returned as a State Secretary, this time in the Ministry of Health and Care Services.

In between his cabinet tenures, he worked as a head of department in the Church City Mission from 2002 to 2005 and program director in Plan Norge from 2009 to 2012. He has chaired Hudøy Feriekoloni and Ecolabelling Norway, and been a board member of Rachel Grepp Foundation and Home Start Norge. From 2011 to 2012, he led the committee that delivered the Norwegian Official Report 1:2012 on kindergartens.
