= Sindre Fossum Beyer =

Norwegian politician

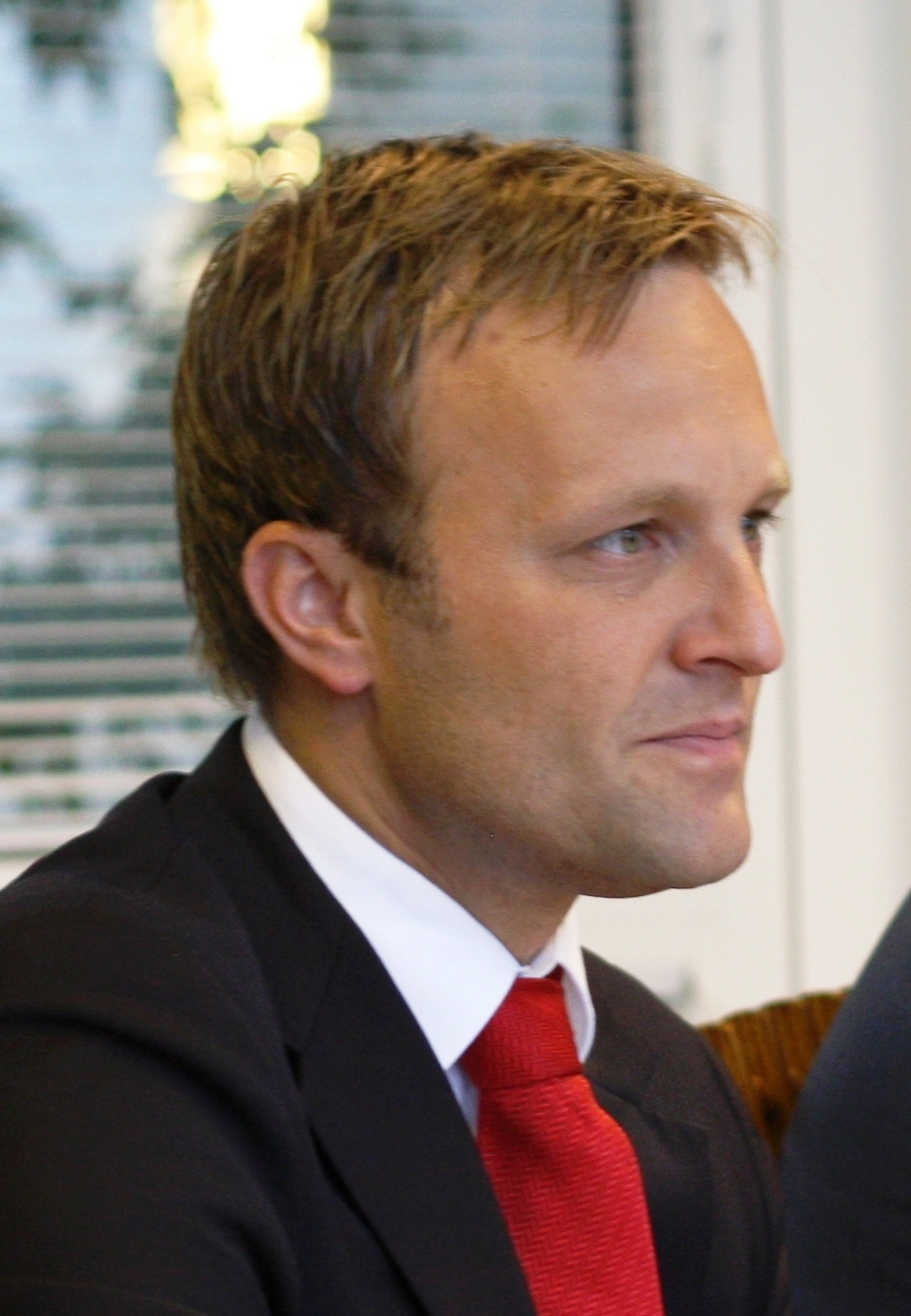
Sindre Fossum Beyer.

Sindre Fossum Beyer (born 10 October 1977) is a Norwegian politician for the Labour Party.

He studied economics and administration at Telemark University College from 1998 to 2000, and marketing at BI Norwegian Business School from 2000 to 2002. After one year in the Norwegian People's Aid, he was hired as political adviser in the Labour Party in 2003. In 2007 he was hired as information director in the Labour Party, as well as studying public relations and strategic communication at master's level at the BI Norwegian Business School.

On the local level Fossum Beyer was a member of Porsgrunn municipal council from 1995 to 1999 and Telemark county council from 1999 to 2003. He served as a deputy representative to the Parliament of Norway from Telemark during the terms 2005–2009. In total he met during 7 days of parliamentary session. In 2009 he was appointed as a political adviser with responsibility for press contact in the Office of the Prime Minister as a part of Stoltenberg's Second Cabinet. He also served as acting State Secretary here from 4 October to 4 November 2012. In 2014 he was hired in the ad agency Try.

He is the son of Øystein Kåre Beyer, mayor of Porsgrunn. He is married to Mette Fossum Beyer, daughter of Grethe Fossum.
