= Henriette Westhrin =

Norwegian politician

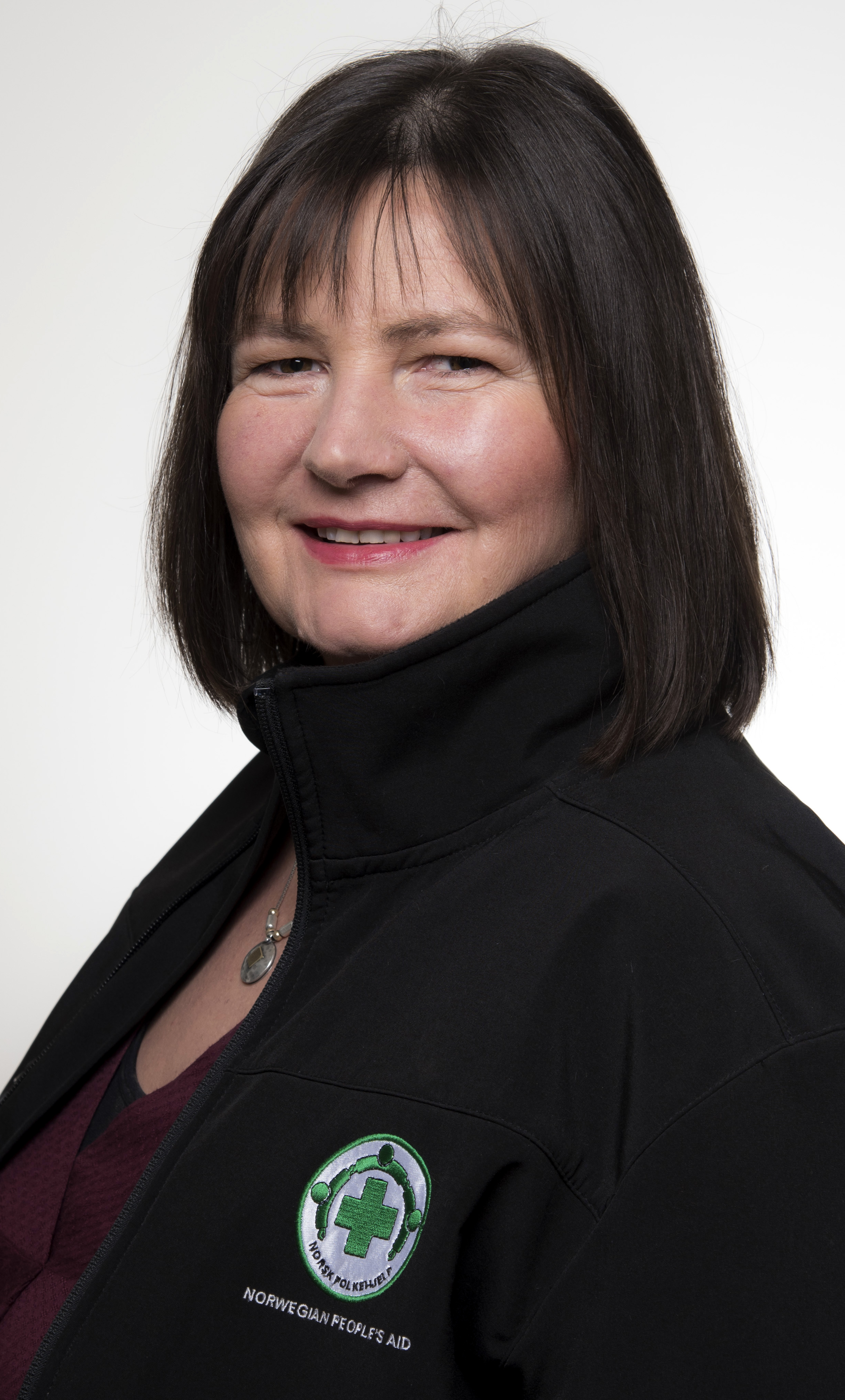
Henriette Killi Westhrin

Henriette Killi Westhrin (born 23 March 1973 in Kragerø) is a Norwegian social worker, trade unionist and politician for the Socialist Left Party. She has been deputy leader of her party from 2003 to 2007 and State Secretary for eight years.

== Career ==
Westhrin studied for one year at Telemark University College, then two years at Akershus University College.

She was a social worker in Lambertseter from 1998 to 2000, and a cultural worker in Bamble Municipality from 2000 to 2002. She was then a secretary in the trade union Norwegian Union of Social Educators and Social Workers for one year.

While studying she was an elected member of the municipal council of Kragerø Municipality. She was the deputy leader of the Socialist Youth from 1994 to 1997, central board member of the Socialist Left Party from 1999 to 2001, leader of Telemark Socialist Left Party for one year and then deputy leader of the Socialist Left Party from 2003 to 2007. She served as a deputy representative to the Parliament of Norway from Telemark during the terms 1993–1997 and 2001–2005. During that time she met during one parliamentary session, and was a member of the committees that delivered the Norwegian Official Reports 2004:1 and 2004:4.

When the Socialist Left Party entered Stoltenberg's Second Cabinet in 2005, Westhrin was appointed State Secretary in the Ministry of the Environment. After the cabinet reshuffle in October 2007, Westhrin became State Secretary in the Ministry of Finance. After another reshuffle in October 2009, Westhrin changed to the Ministry of Children and Equality, before rejoining the Ministry of the Environment in March 2012. She lost her seat at the 2013 election in the following October.
