= Lars Erik Flatø =

Norwegian politician (born 1964)

Lars Erik Flatø (born 9 October 1964) is a Norwegian politician for the Labour Party.

A cand.mag. by education, he worked in health administration, both at Ullevål University Hospital and later as director of health and social affairs in Akershus county municipality. Between 1993 and 1994, he was secretary to the city councilor of health in Oslo.

He was then a member of Oslo city council during the term 1995–1999. During the cabinet Jagland, Bugge was appointed political advisor in the Ministry of Health, while in the first cabinet Stoltenberg he was appointed State Secretary in the same ministry. During the second cabinet Stoltenberg, he was appointed chief of staff (stabssjef) in the Office of the Prime Minister. In late 2006 he sought to leave and was replaced by Karl Eirik Schjøtt-Pedersen.
