= Liv (given name) =

Liv is a Nordic female given name derived from the Old Norse "hlíf", which means "shelter" or "protection". In modern Norwegian, Swedish, and Danish it is also homophonous with the word "liv" meaning "life".

In Norse mythology, Líf and Lífþrasir (Old Norse masculine name from líf and þrasir), were two humans foretold to survive Ragnarök and to repopulate the world.

Sometimes Liv can be a shortened version of Olivia.

== Given name ==
- Liv Aasen (1928–2005), Norwegian politician for the Labour Party
- Liv Andersen (1919–1997), Norwegian politician for the Labour Party
- Liv Arnesen (born 1953), Norwegian cross-country skier, adventurer, guide, and motivational speaker
- Liv Kjersti Bergman (born 1979), Norwegian biathlete
- Liv Boeree (born 1984), British poker player, TV presenter, and model
- Liv Dawson, British pop singer
- Liv Dommersnes (1922–2014), Norwegian actress and reciter of poetry
- Liv Kristine Espenæs (born 1976), Norwegian singer
- Liv Lisa Fries (born 1990), German actress
- Liv Mildrid Gjernes (born 1954), Norwegian artist
- Liv Gjølstad (born 1945), Norwegian judge
- Liv Heløe (born 1963), Norwegian actress and writer
- Liv Jensen, Norwegian luger who competed in the late 1930s
- Liv Køltzow (1945–2025), Norwegian novelist, playwright, biographer and essayist
- Liv Lindeland (born 1945), Norwegian model and actress
- Liv Løberg (born 1949), Norwegian practical nurse, organization leader and politician for the Progress Party
- Liv Maessen, Australian pop singer
- Liv McGill (born 2006), American basketball player
- Liv Morgan (born 1994), American professional wrestler
- Liv Signe Navarsete (born 1958), Norwegian politician
- Liv Nysted (1949–2010), Norwegian writer
- Liv Paulsen (1925–2001), Norwegian 100 metres sprinter and shot putter
- Liv Sandven (born 1946), Norwegian politician from the Christian Democratic Party
- Liv Grete Skjelbreid (born 1974), Norwegian biathlete
- Liv Strædet (born 1964), Norwegian football player
- Liv Stubberud (1930–1997), Norwegian politician
- Liv Monica Stubholt (born 1961), politician, investment director for Aker Clean Carbon
- Liv Thorsen (1935–2021), Norwegian actress
- Liv Tomter (1901–1978), Norwegian politician for the Labour Party
- Liv Tyler (born 1977), American actress and model
- Liv Ullmann (born 1938), Norwegian actress and film director

== Fictional characters ==
- Liv Chenka, character of the BBC science-fiction series Doctor Who
- Liv Flaherty, character from the British soap opera Emmerdale
- Liv Moore, main character on the TV series iZombie
- Olivia "Liv" Rooney, one of the main title characters of the Disney Channel sitcom Liv and Maddie
- Liv, character played by Kate Hudson in Bride Wars film
- Liv, playable dancer in Just Dance 2023 Edition within the song Bring Me to Life by Evanescence.
- Liv Parker, character played by Penelope Mitchell in the 2009 drama series The Vampire Diaries.
