= Ulriksen =

Ulriksen is a surname. Notable people with the surname include:

- Mark Ulriksen (born 1957), American painter
- Vidar Ulriksen (born 1953), Norwegian fisher
