= Randi Øverland =

Norwegian politician (born 1952)

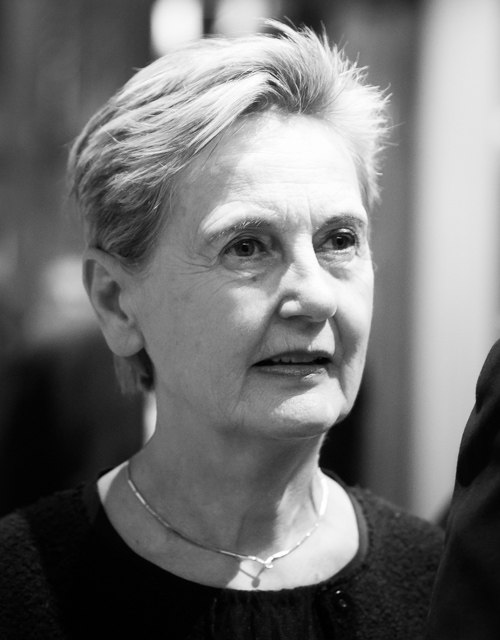

Randi Øverland (born 22 April 1952) is a Norwegian politician in the Labour Party.

She was twice State Secretary in the Ministry of Church Affairs, Education and Research, from 1990 to 1995 during the third cabinet Brundtland and from 2000 to 2001 during the first cabinet Stoltenberg. From 2005 to 2007, during the second cabinet Stoltenberg, she was again appointed State Secretary, this time in the Ministry of Culture and Church Affairs.

On the local level, she has served two terms as a member of Kristiansand city council. She is also a former leader of the local party chapter.

Outside politics she has worked in the high school sector as a teacher, and later, rector.
