= Støstad =

Støstad is a surname. Notable people with the surname include:

- Jan-Erik Støstad (born 1953), Norwegian politician
- Rune Støstad (born 1972), Norwegian politician
- Sverre Støstad (1887–1959), Norwegian politician
