= Raimo Valle =

Norwegian politician

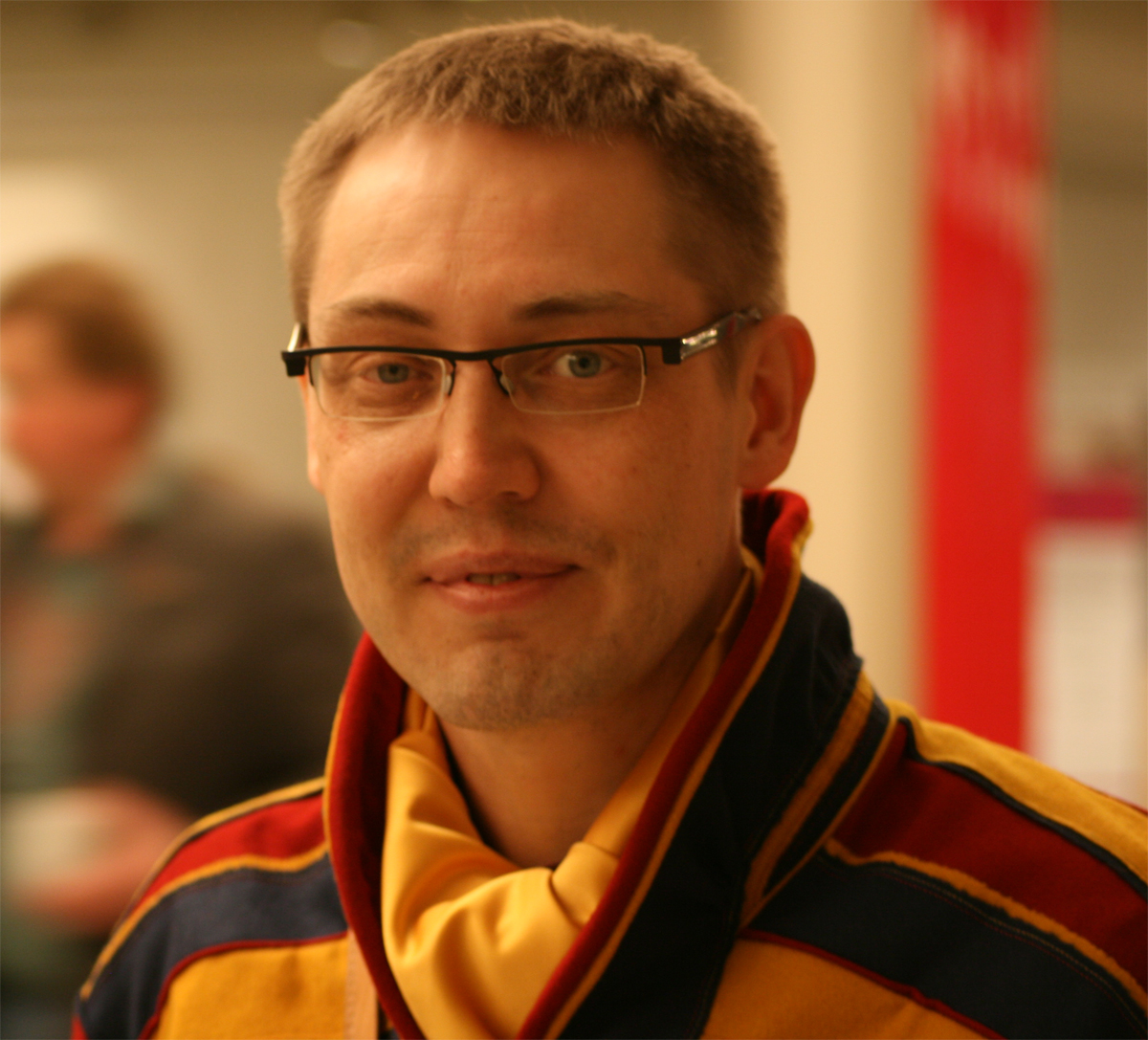
Raimo Valle

Raimo Valle (born 15 September 1965) is a Norwegian civil servant and politician for the Labour Party.

He hails from Nesseby Municipality. He graduated as cand.mag. from the University of Tromsø in 1989. Outside politics he worked as a consultant in Troms County Municipality from 1993 to 2007. He was a board member of the Centre for Sami Studies, University of Tromsø after graduating, was the county leader of the Federation of Norwegian Professional Associations in Troms from 1999 to 2003 and from 2001 to 2007 he was a board member of the Association of Social Scientists.

In 2007, he was appointed to Stoltenberg's Second Cabinet as a State Secretary in the Ministry of Labour and Social Inclusion. He left office in 2012.
