= Kjetil Skogrand =

Norwegian historian and politician

Kjetil Skogrand (born 5 January 1967) is a Norwegian historian and politician for the Labour Party.

He took the Master of Arts degree in International Relations at the University of Sussex in 1992, and the cand.philol. degree at the University of Oslo in 1994. He was a research fellow at the Norwegian Institute of International Affairs from 1994 to 1995 and a researcher at the Norwegian Institute for Defence Studies from 1997 to 2005.

When the second cabinet Stoltenberg assumed office following the 2005 election, he was appointed State Secretary in the Ministry of Foreign Affairs. He resigned in November 2006.
