= Krishna Chudasama =

Norwegian politician (born 1961)

- Born: 7 August 1961 (age 64)
- Occupation: Politician
- Political party: Labour Party

Krishna Chudasama (born 7 August 1961) is a Norwegian politician for the Labour Party.

During the second cabinet Stoltenberg, she was appointed State Secretary in the Ministry of Children and Equality. An ethnic Indian from Tanzania who came to Norway in 1988, she was the first State Secretary with immigrant background as well as the only person in the cabinet administration with an ethnic minority background. In 2007 she lost her position as the Ministry of Children and Equality halved its number of State Secretaries. Instead, Hadia Tajik, of Pakistani descent, was drafted into the cabinet administration as a political advisor, and later that year Manuela Ramin-Osmundsen became the first cabinet member with immigrant background.

Before being a State Secretary Chudasama was the municipal commissioner of social affairs (sosialombud) in Fredrikstad municipality. She is a former member of Fredrikstad city council.
