= Ahmad Ghanizadeh =

Personal details
- Born: 21 December 1961 (age 64) Tehran, Iran
- Party: Socialist Left Party
- Children: 4
- Education: University of Tehran; University of Oslo
- Profession: Lawyer

Ahmad Ghanizadeh (Persian: احمد غنی‌زاده; born 21 December 1961) is a Norwegian-Iranian politician for the Socialist Left Party. From 23 March 2012 to 16 October 2013, he served as State Secretary in the Ministry of Children and Equality.

== Early life and education ==
Born in Tehran, Iran in 1961, he was first employed as a journalist and teacher while studying engineering and telecommunication at the University of Tehran. He first emigrated to Norway as at age 25, before completing his degree. After settling in Ringerike municipality, he studied and worked as an interpreter, before studying law at the University of Oslo, receiving his law degree in 1997.

== Career ==
After graduating from Law school in 1997, Ghanizadeh was employed as deputy director at the Ministry of Local Government and Regional Development, then under Ragnhild Queseth Haarstad. First as a consultant, and later as deputy director.

From 1 January 2005 he was appointed as head of the new Section for Integration and Diversity after his previous department was merged into the newly established Ministry of Labour, he was then put in charge of managing the Norwegian government's immigrant absorption policy. He subsequently switched to the Ministry of Children, Equality and Social Inclusion. On 23 March 2012 he was promoted to the position of State Secretary, which was second only to the minister Inga Marte Thorkildsen. He held this position until 16 October 2013.

== Personal life ==
After relocating to Norway, Ghanizadeh settled in Ringerike, and later to Sundvollen in Hole municipality, outside Oslo. He currently resides there, with his wife Grethe, and four children.
