= Lønseth =

Lønseth is a Norwegian surname. Notable people with the surname include:

- Inger Lønseth (born 1945), Norwegian politician
- Mari Holm Lønseth, Norwegian politician
- Pål Lønseth (born 1970), Norwegian jurist and former politician
- Siri Holm Lønseth (born 1986), Norwegian politician
