= Maurseth =

Maurseth is a surname. Notable people with the surname include:

- Benedicte Maurseth (born 1983), Norwegian traditional folk singer and musician
- Per Maurseth (1932–2013), Norwegian historian and politician
- Per Botolf Maurseth (born 1969), Norwegian economist and politician, son of Per
