= Anita Utseth =

Norwegian politician (born 1966)

Anita Utseth (born 26 August 1966) is a Norwegian engineer and politician for the Centre Party.

She graduated from Møre og Romsdal College of Engineering in 1987 and as a siv.ing. from the Norwegian Institute of Technology in 1991. She was a chief engineer in the Norwegian Petroleum Directorate from 1992 to 2000 and an adviser in the Norwegian Directorate for Nature Management from 2000 to 2003. From 2004 to 2005 she was the HMS director of the company Pertra.

She was a central board member of the Centre Youth from 1992 to 1993, having formerly chaired the district branch in Sør-Trøndelag from 1987 to 1990. She was a member of Sør-Trøndelag county council from 1991 to 1992, and was elected to Trondheim city council in 2003. In 2005, when Stoltenberg's Second Cabinet assumed office, she was appointed as a State Secretary in the Ministry of Petroleum and Energy. She resigned in 2007.
