= Dag Henrik Sandbakken =

Norwegian politician (born 1957)

Dag Henrik Sandbakken (born 17 August 1957) is a Norwegian farmer and politician for the Centre Party.

He served as a deputy representative to the Parliament of Norway from Hedmark during the 2005–2009 term. When Stoltenberg's Second Cabinet assumed office following the 2005 elections, Sandbakken was appointed State Secretary in the Ministry of Local Government and Regional Development. He resigned in February 2013.

On the local level, Sandbakken served as mayor of Tynset Municipality from 1999 to 2005. He worked as a farmer, and in addition to his agronomist education he was educated at Hedmark University College. He was hired in the Norwegian Association of Local and Regional Authorities.
