= Per J. Jordal =

Norwegian jurist and politician

Per Johannessønn Jordal (born 20 July 1967) is a Norwegian jurist and politician for the Centre Party. He graduated from the University of Bergen as cand.jur. in 1993. He has worked as a lawyer, acting presiding judge in Gulating, and as a judge in Nordhordland District Court.

Jordal was secretary of the Centre Party in 1993 and a member of its central committee from 2003. He was a deputy member of the municipal council of Os Municipality. In March 2008 he was appointed State Secretary in the Office of the Prime Minister.
