= Youth against the EU (Norway) =

Norwegian anti-EU organization

Youth against the EU Norwegian: Ungdom mot EU
- Formation: 1991
- Type: NGO
- Headquarters: Storgata 32, 0184 Oslo, Norway
- Leader: Reidun Heggen
- Parent organization: Nei til EU
- Website: http://www.umeu.no

Ungdom mot EU (Youth against the EU) is the youth organization of Nei til EU, opposing a future Norwegian membership of and adaption to the European Union (EU). Their main arguments against a Norwegian membership of the EU are democracy, environmental concerns and solidarity, claiming that the EU undermines democratic processes, damages the environment and is a hindrance for the economic growth of developing countries.

== Leaders of Ungdom mot EU ==
Name	Years
Frankie Solberg Rød	2020–
Reidun Berntsen Heggen	2019–2020
Eirik Fenstad Thorbjørnsen	2018–2019
Syver Glordencio Mendoza Zachariassen	2016–2018
Åsa Kjerstine Kjølberg Moen	2015–2016
Bjørn Ola Opsahl	2014–2015
Mads Opheim	2013–2014
Marte Gustad Iversen	2011–2012
Tale Marte Dæhlen	2010–2011
Sigrid Z. Heiberg	2009–2010
Tore Syvert Haga	2007–2008
Gunvor Hass	2006–2007
Hedda Haakestad	2004–2005
Maria Walberg	2002–2003
Maria Lyngstad	2000–2001
Trude Sørensen	1999 –2000
Haakon Flemmen	1997–1999
Kari Anne Moe	1995–1997
Halvard Ingebrigtsen	1993–1995
Olav Sannes Vika	1991–1993
