= Tone-Helen Toften =

Norwegian politician

Tone-Helen Toften (born 13 March 1967) is a Norwegian politician for the Labour Party.

She was an office worker in Sortland in the 1990s, then later took education at Bodø University College. When finishing her teacher's education in 2005 she worked four years as such in Sortland.

She was a member of the municipal council of Sortland Municipality from 1999 to 2009. She chaired the local party from 2002 to 2009 and the county party chapter from 2009 to 2011. From 2007 to 2009 she was a member of the national board, then the central board from 2011.

She was a State Secretary in the Ministry of Health and Care Services from 2009 to 2011, then in the Ministry of Government Administration, Reform and Church Affairs from 2011 to 2013. She was elected as a deputy representative to the Parliament of Norway from Nordland in 2013. As Lisbeth Berg-Hansen from Nordland was a member of the outgoing Stoltenberg's Second Cabinet, Toften met as a regular representative during the two weeks before the cabinet change.
