= Hilde Singsaas =

Norwegian politician

Hilde Singsaas (born 13 March 1972) is a Norwegian politician for the Labour Party.

During the cabinet Jagland, she was appointed political advisor in the Ministry of Children and Family Affairs. During the first cabinet Stoltenberg, she was again appointed political advisor, this time in the Office of the Prime Minister. In 2006, during the second cabinet Stoltenberg, she was appointed State Secretary in the Office of the Prime Minister.

She took her education at the University of Oslo, and has worked as an advisor in ECON (2002–2005) and the Norwegian branch of the Red Cross (2005–).
