= Skjærvik =

Skjærvik is a surname. Notable people with the surname include:

- Per Skjærvik (born 1953), Norwegian politician
- Rita Skjærvik (born 1974), Norwegian politician
- Vetle Skjærvik (born 2000), Norwegian footballer
