= Wegard Harsvik =

Norwegian politician (born 1967)

- Born: 19 July 1967 (age 58)
- Occupation: Norwegian Politician

Wegard Harsvik (born 19 July 1967) is a Norwegian politician for the Labour Party.

He served in the position of deputy representative to the Norwegian Parliament from Nordland during the term 1989–1993.

During the first cabinet, Stoltenberg Harsvik worked as a political advisor in the Ministry of Church, Education, and Research. When the second cabinet Stoltenberg assumed office following the 2005 elections, Harsvik was appointed State Secretary in the Ministry of Health and Care Services. In late 2007 he changed to the Ministry of Culture and Church Affairs.

Outside politics he has worked in the Friends of the Earth Norway, Sosialdemokrater mot EU and the Norwegian Union of Municipal and General Employees.
