= Hege Solbakken =

Norwegian politician

Hege Solbakken (born 22 July 1972, in Austevoll Municipality) is a Norwegian politician for the Centre Party.

In 2000, while the first cabinet Bondevik held office, she was appointed political advisor in the Ministry of Fisheries. In 2008, while the second cabinet Stoltenberg held office, she was appointed State Secretary in the Ministry of Transport and Communications.

She took her education at the University of Bergen, and was deputy leader of the Studentersamfunnet i Bergen in 1999. She has also been active in Nei til EU.
