= Mette Gundersen =

Norwegian politician

Mette Gundersen (born 24 June 1972) is a Norwegian politician for the Labour Party.

She served as a deputy representative to the Norwegian Parliament from Vest-Agder during the term 2001–2005. When Jens Stoltenberg formed his second cabinet following the 2005 elections, Gundersen was appointed State Secretary in the Ministry of Culture and Church Affairs. Deputy Chairman, Norwegian Association of Local and Regional Authorities (2012-) and a member of the Broadcasting Council (2014-).

On the local level, Gundersen was the deputy mayor of Kristiansand municipality 2007–2011.
