= Terje Moland Pedersen =

Norwegian politician (born 1952)

Terje Moland Pedersen (born 22 March 1952) is a Norwegian police officer and politician for the Labour Party.

He finished his secondary education in 1972, and graduated from police academy in 1977. From 1974 to 1995 he worked as a police officer, since 1977 in Fredrikstad. He became involved in the trade unions, and was a supervisory council member of Norsk Politiforbund from 1992 to 1996.

He was a member of Fredrikstad municipal council from 1991 to 2005. From 2005 to 2012 he was a State Secretary in the Ministry of Justice and the Police as a part of Stoltenberg's Second Cabinet.

He chaired Borg Port Authority from 1993 to 1996 and 1999 to 2003, was a board member of Viken Havneselskap from 2003 to 2005 and chaired Norwegian Ports Association from 2004 to 2005.
