= Singsaas =

Singsaas is a surname. Notable people with the surname include:

- Hilde Singsaas (born 1972), Norwegian politician for the Labour Party
- Tor Singsaas (born 1948), Norwegian Lutheran minister
- Petter Christian Singsaas (born 1972), Norwegian football player
