= Nina Tangnæs Grønvold =

Norwegian politician (born 1969)

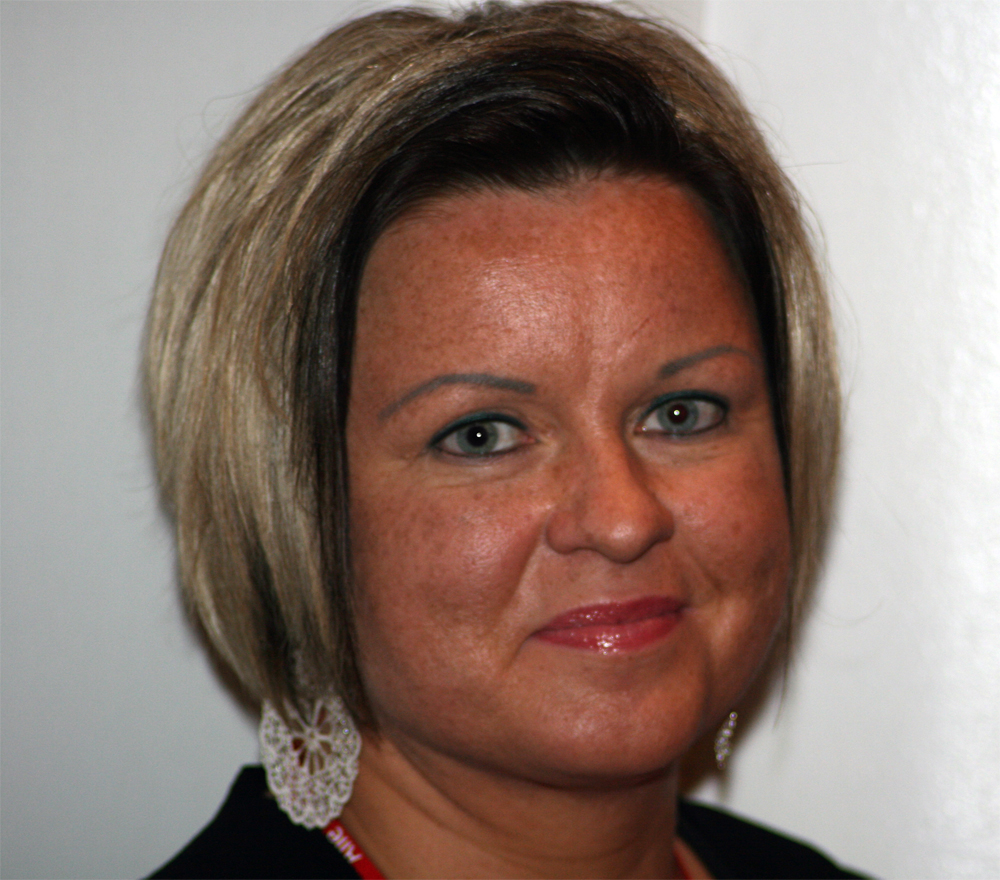
Nina Tangnas Gronvold

Nina Tangnæs Grønvold (born 14 December 1969) is a Norwegian politician for the Labour Party.

She was a State Secretary in the Ministry of Education, Research and Church Affairs in Stoltenberg's First Cabinet, from 1 June 2001 until later that autumn when the cabinet fell. In September 2012 she was appointed to Stoltenberg's Second Cabinet as a State Secretary in the Ministry of Health and Care Services.
