= Rita Skjærvik =

Norwegian politician

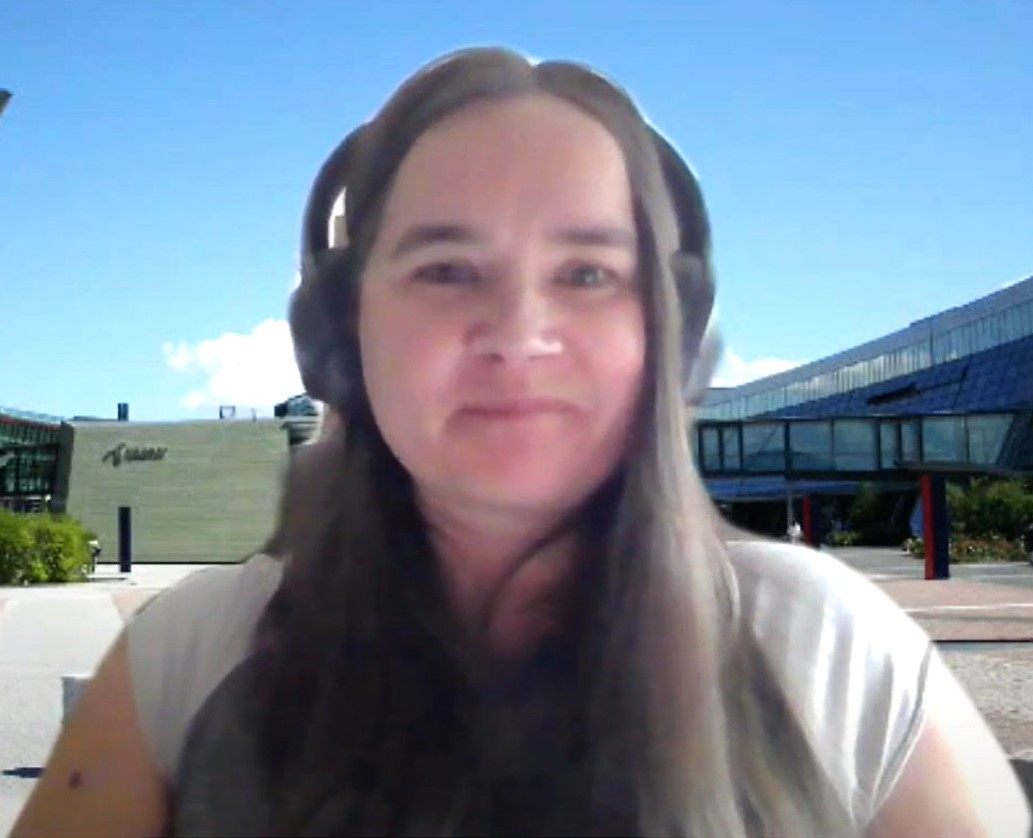
Skjærvik speaks at Access Now RightsCon in 2021

Rita Skjærvik (born 13 March 1974) is a Norwegian politician for the Labour Party.

She started her political career in the Workers' Youth League, as deputy leader of that organization in Sør-Trøndelag, from 1993 to 1995. In 1995 she was elected to the municipal council of Rissa Municipality. She later enrolled at the University of Oslo, graduating in political science.

She worked as a secretary for the Workers' Youth League from 1996 to 1998, and as an advisor in the Labour Party from 1999. From 2002 to 2003 she worked as a personal advisor for Jens Stoltenberg. When the second cabinet Stoltenberg assumed office following the 2005 election, she was appointed State Secretary in the Office of the Prime Minister.
