= Roger Schjerva =

Norwegian politician (born 1968)

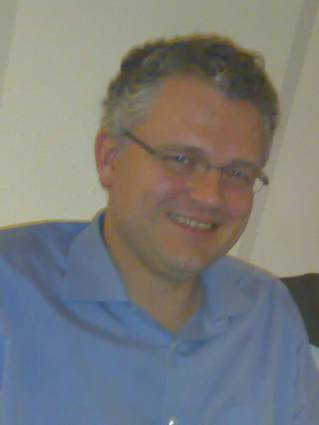
Roger Schjerva

Roger Schjerva (born 19 January 1968) is a Norwegian politician for the Socialist Left Party.

Born in Skien and grown up Bø in Telemark.he graduated as cand.oecon. from the University of Oslo in 2000. He started his political career as a secretary and advisor for his party.

When the second cabinet Stoltenberg assumed office following the 2005 election, he was appointed State Secretary in the Ministry of Finance.
