= Pål Lønseth =

Norwegian politician (born 1970)

Pål Kulø Lønseth (born 1970) is a Norwegian jurist and former politician for the Labour Party.

He grew up in Kristiansund, and graduated from the University of Bergen with the cand.jur. degree in 1996. Lønseth eventually became a public prosecutor, among others in a war crimes case in Oslo City Court relating to actions committed during the Bosnian Civil War. From 2009 to 2013 he was a member of Stoltenberg's Second Cabinet as a State Secretary in the Justice and the Police. Ending his political career, he was hired as head of the research department in PwC Norway. He remained here until 2020, when he was appointed as the new director of the National Authority for Investigation and Prosecution of Economic and Environmental Crime in Norway (Økokrim).

Lønseth was a footballer during his youth. In later years, he took up endurance sports such as the Styrkeprøven cycling race and the Norseman Xtreme Triathlon.

Police appointments
Preceded by Hedvig Moe (acting)	Director of Økokrim; 2020–present	Incumbent
