= Jon Reidar Øyan =

Norwegian gay rights activist

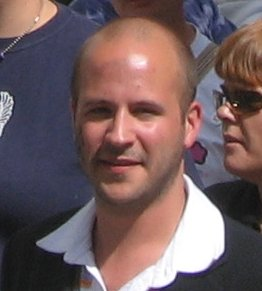
Jon Reidar Øyan

Jon Reidar Øyan (born 15 April 1981) is a Norwegian gay rights activist and politician for the Labour Party.

He made his mark as leader of the Norwegian National Association for Lesbian and Gay Liberation, and stepped down in 2008. He was then hired as an advisor for the parliamentary group of the Norwegian Labour Party. He had a background as a member of the municipal council of Snillfjord Municipality. In October 2009 he was appointed political advisor in the Norwegian Ministry of Labour and Social Inclusion. From November to December 2011 he was an acting State Secretary in the Ministry of Government Administration, Reform and Church Affairs. He was later a personal adviser to Helga Pedersen.
