= Ole Morten Geving =

Norwegian politician

Ole Morten Geving (6 August 1974 – 21 December 2023) was a Norwegian politician for the Centre Party.

Born in Nord-Trøndelag county, he moved to Hølen at a young age and became a member of the Centre Youth there. He presided the Nordic organization of Centrist youth wings from 1999 to 2001. From 1999 to 2003 he was a member of the municipal council of Flatanger Municipality. Professionally, he worked as a secretary and advisor in the Centre Party, having graduated as cand.polit. from the Norwegian University of Science and Technology in 2000.

In 2006 he was hired in Gambit Hill & Knowlton, and in 2007 he was elected to the municipal council of his native Vestby Municipality. In October 2007 he was appointed State Secretary in the Norwegian Ministry of Finance. He left in 2010. In 2011 he was hired as director of trade policy in the Norwegian Savings Banks Association. His position was terminated after Geving was convicted to a prison sentence in Follo District Court. He died in December 2023 in Basel, aged 49.
