= Vidar Ulriksen =

Norwegian fisher and politician

Vidar Ulriksen (born 11 December 1953) is a Norwegian fisher and politician for the Labour Party.

He was a member of the national board of Norges Fiskarlag from 1986 to 1996, the last eight years as deputy leader. He chaired this organization on a regional level from 1984 to 1994.

When Stoltenberg's Second Cabinet assumed office following the 2005 election, he was appointed State Secretary in the Norwegian Ministry of Fisheries and Coastal Affairs. He left in January 2011. On the local level he was a member of the municipal council of Flora Municipality, and a board member of the regional party chapter.
