= Sigrid Z. Heiberg =

Norwegian politician (born 1988)

Sigrid Zurbuchen Heiberg (born 9 September 1988) is a Norwegian politician for the Green Party.

She hails from Kaupanger. She was the leader of Youth against the EU from 2009 to 2010, but later changed her opinion and became a proponent for Norwegian membership in the EU.

She was elected to Oslo city council in 2019, and also served as the leader of Oslo Green Party until 2025. She proceeded to announce her candicacy for deputy leadership of the national party.

When the Green Party nominated its candidates for the 2021 Norwegian parliamentary election, Heiberg declined to head the ballot in Sogn og Fjordane. She was instead elected as a deputy representative to the Parliament of Norway from Oslo for the terms 2021–2025 and 2025–2029. By 2015 she had met during 249 days of parliamentary session. Notably, she was refused to speak from the Parliament chair wearing a Palestinian keffiyeh.
