= Arvid Libak =

Norwegian politician (born 1957)

Arvid Libak (born 12 September 1957) is a Norwegian politician for the Labour Party.

In 1992, during the third cabinet Brundtland, Libak was appointed political advisor to the Minister of Social Affairs, a position he held to 1995. In 2005, during the second cabinet Stoltenberg, Libak was appointed political advisor in the Ministry of Health and Care Services. After one year he became state secretary in the same ministry. In June 2008 he changed to the Ministry of Industry and Trade.

Having spent most of his career in politics, Libak was the information director of Ullevål university hospital from 1996 to 2000.
