= Liv Monica Stubholt =

Norwegian politician (born 1961)

State Secretary for the Ministry of Petroleum and Energy
- In office 21 September 2007 – 27 March 2009
- Prime Minister: Jens Stoltenberg
- Minister: Åslaug Haga; Terje Riis-Johansen

State Secretary for the Ministry of Foreign Affairs
- In office 7 November 2005 – 21 September 2007
- Prime Minister: Jens Stoltenberg
- Minister: Jonas Gahr Støre

Personal details
- Born: 24 July 1961 (age 65)
- Party: Centre
- Education: University of Oslo

Liv Monica Bargem Stubholt (born 24 July 1961) is a Norwegian lawyer and former politician for the Norwegian Centre Party. She currently serves as a partner in law firm Selmer AS and former industry executive as Senior Vice President Strategy and Communication in Kvaerner ASA - a listed EPC company in the petroleum industry.

== Education ==
Stubholt graduated as cand.jur. from the University of Oslo in 1987.

== Career ==
=== Stoltenberg government ===
When the second cabinet Stoltenberg assumed office following the 2005 elections, Stubholt was appointed State Secretary in the Ministry of Foreign Affairs. In 2007, she was appointed State Secretary in the Ministry of Petroleum and Energy.

=== Post politics ===
Following her time in politics, Stubholt has a long career as a business lawyer including as partner in law firm BA-HR. She serves a trusted advisor to a number of international companies invested in Norway. She joined Aker ASA as investment director for Aker Clean Carbon in 2009. Stubholt was acting CEO in Aker Seafoods in 2010.

From 2016 to 2020, Stubholt held the chair of the Norwegian-Russian Chamber of Commerce. In an op-ed in Aftenposten in 2017, she expressed concern that "trade sanctions [have] greater effects than intended," and advocated for Norway and Russia to "engage diplomatically to lay the groundwork for scaling back sanctions and strengthening cooperation between businesses on both sides of the border.

She was the chair of RN Nordic Oil AS from March 2016 to November 2019.

In December 2021, she was elected to the board of Gigante Salmon AS.

== Other activities ==
- International Crisis Group (ICG), Board of Trustees (since 2012)
- Board member, Norsk Hydro ASA
- Board member Norwegian - German Chamber of Commerce in Oslo
- Member of the advisory board of Frithjof Nansens Institute
- Former chairman of the board of Aker Clean Carbon AS
- Former member of the board of Statnett SF
- Formerly on the Committee of State Secretaries on International Strategy for Social Corporate Responsibility;Norway
- Formerly on the Committee of State Secretaries on Polar Affairs;Norway
- Former member of the Disciplinary Council for the Oslo branch of the Norwegian Bar Association
- Former Supervisory Committee Anti-Money Laundering (appointed by the Ministry of Finance)
