= Laila Gustavsen =

Norwegian politician

Laila Gustavsen (born 24 October 1973) is a Norwegian politician for the Labour Party.

She served in the position of deputy representative to the Norwegian Parliament from Buskerud during the terms 2001–2005 and 2005–2009. When the second cabinet Stoltenberg assumed office following the 2005 elections, Gustavsen was appointed State Secretary in the Ministry of Labour and Social Inclusion.
