= Jens Revold =

Norwegian politician (born 1948)

Jens Revold (born 29 August 1948) is a Norwegian politician for the Socialist Left Party.

He graduated as siv.øk. from BI Norwegian Business School in 1975, and cand.polit. from the University of Tromsø in 1980. He has also been a member of Tromsø city council.

In October 2007 he was appointed State Secretary in the Ministry of Education and Research.
