= Håkon Gulbrandsen =

Norwegian diplomat and politician

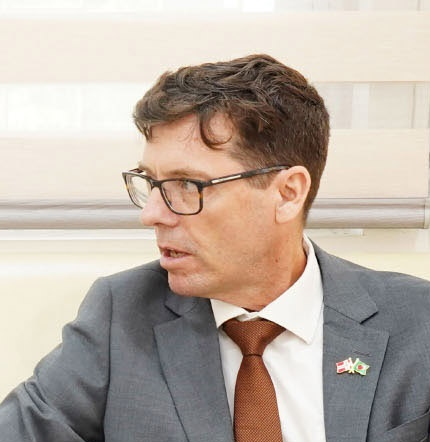
Gulbrandsen in 2026

Håkon Arald Gulbrandsen (born 15 March 1969) is a Norwegian diplomat and politician for the Socialist Left Party.

Hailing from Halden, he graduated as cand.jur. from the University of Tromsø in 1995. He had chaired the county chapters of Socialist Youth in Østfold (1985–1988) and Troms (1990–1991). He served as a deputy representative to the Norwegian Parliament from Østfold during the term 1989–1993, and was a member of Halden city council from 1991 to 1995.

He worked as a consultant in the Ministry of Health and Social Affairs in 1995. In 1997 he began a career in the Ministry of Foreign Affairs, climbing to the positions of embassy secretary in Damascus (1999–2002) and Pretoria (2006–2007).

In November 2007 he was appointed State Secretary to the Minister of International Development.
