= Per Botolf Maurseth =

Norwegian politician (born 1969)

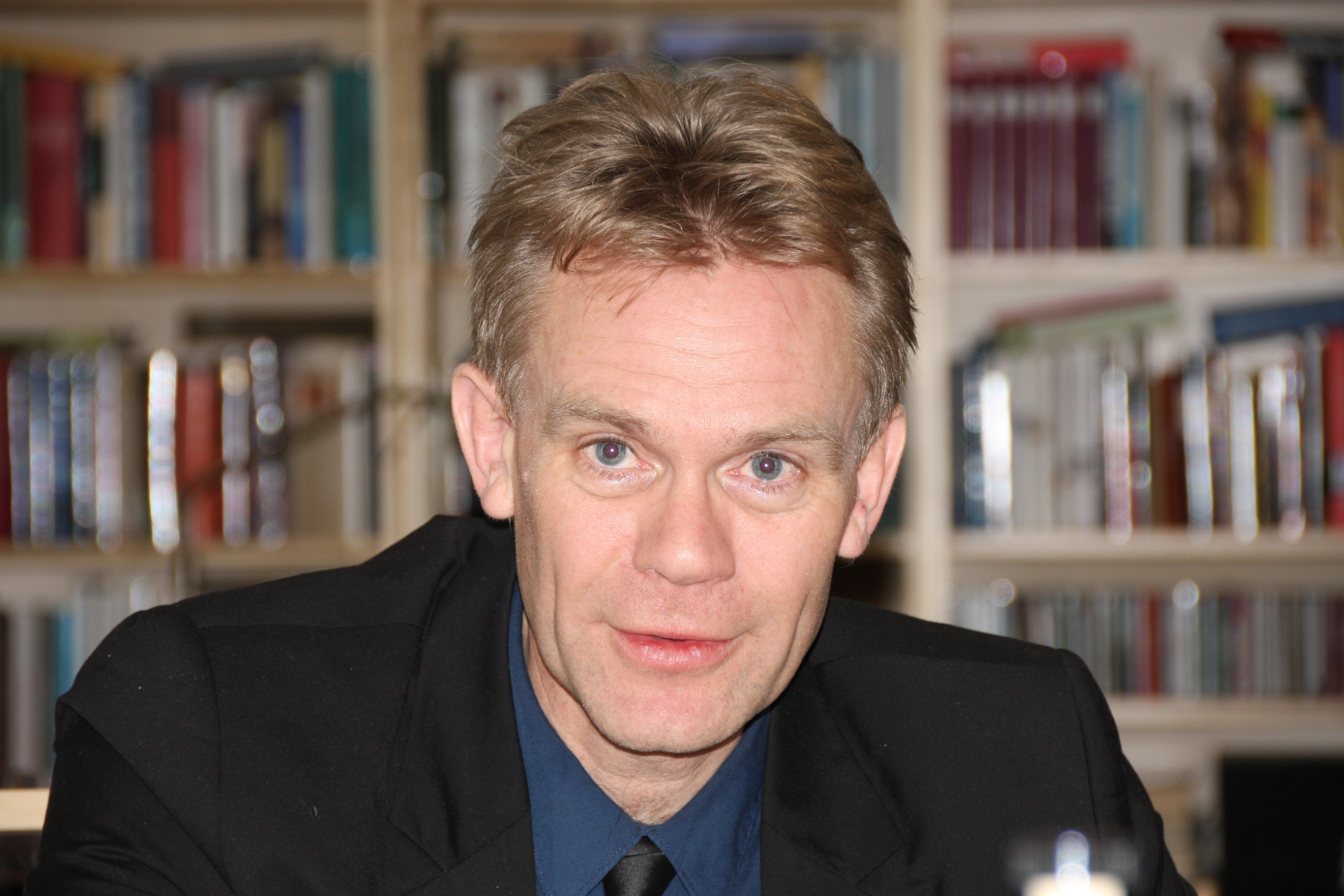
Per Botolf Maurseth

Per Botolf Maurseth (born 17 July 1969) is a Norwegian economist and politician for the Socialist Left Party. He is the son of historian Per Maurseth and Aase Maurseth.

From 1989 to 1990 he chaired the regional chapter of Socialist Youth, the youth wing of the Socialist Left Party. He was also a member of their national board. From 1992 to 1994 he was a member of their central board. He served in the position of deputy representative to the Norwegian Parliament from Sør-Trøndelag during the term 1993–1997.

He graduated from the University of Oslo with the cand.oecon. degree in 1995, and took the dr.polit. degree in 2001 with the paper Essays on the nature, the scope and the consequences of knowledge. From 1995 to 2006 he worked as a researcher at NUPI. In September 2006, during the second cabinet Stoltenberg, Maurseth was appointed State Secretary in the Ministry of Education and Research. In October 2007 he left and returned to NUPI.

Per Botolf Maurseth is currently an associate professor at the economics department of BI, Norwegian School of Management.
