= 1994 Norwegian European Union membership referendum =

- 27–28 November 1994
- Should Norway become a member of the EU (European Union)?

Results
Choice	Votes	%
Yes	1,389,997	47.82%
No	1,516,803	52.18%
Valid votes	2,906,800	99.88%
Invalid or blank votes	3,571	0.12%
Total votes	2,910,321	100.00%
Registered voters/turnout	3,266,064	89.11%
- Results by county

A referendum on joining the European Union was held in Norway on 27 and 28 November 1994. After a long period of heated debate, the "no" side won with 52.2 per cent of the vote, on a turnout of 88.6 per cent. Membership of what was then the European Community had previously been rejected in a 1972 referendum, and by French veto in 1962.

As of 2026, this was the most recent referendum in Norway.

== Campaign ==
The "No" campaign was led by Anne Enger Lahnstein, leader of the Centre Party. The main themes of the "No" campaign were loss of sovereignty if Norway should join the Union, as well as the fundamental differences in economic structure between Norway and the EU, as Norway has an economy based heavily on natural resources (especially oil and fish), in contrast to the EU's more industrial economy.

Prime Minister Gro Harlem Brundtland led the "Yes" campaign. Her party, the Labour Party, was divided on the question of Norwegian membership of the Union. Unlike Trygve Bratteli in 1972, she refused to threaten to resign if the referendum failed to result in a "Yes" vote, on the grounds that more serious divisions could have arisen in the Labour Party. The main arguments of the "Yes" side were that as a European country, Norway belonged in the European Union, and that Norway's economy would benefit from membership.

According to John Erik Fossum, a political science professor at ARENA, Centre for European Studies, University of Oslo, "the fact that Norway had already signed the EEA agreement made it easier for people to vote no because they knew that Norway had assured EU market access."

=== Debates ===
1994 Norwegian EU membership debates
Date	Time	Organizers	P Present I Invitee N Non-invitee								
Date	Time	Organizers	Ap	H	Sp	Sv	KrF	Frp	V	R	Refs
25 November 1994	00:00	NRK	P Gro Harlem Brundtland, Thorbjørn Jagland	P Jan Petersen	P Anne Enger Lahnstein	P Erik Solheim	P Kjell Magne Bondevik	P Carl I. Hagen	P Odd Einar Dørum	P Aksel Nærstad	
									I	NY	
9 November 1994	00:00	NRK and Student Society in Trondheim	P Thorbjørn Berntsen	P John G. Bernander	P Marit Arnstad	P Erik Solheim	N	N	P Rune Haaland	P Heidi Sørensen	
									SME	LO	
14 November 1994	00:00	NRK at Fokus Kino	P Gro Harlem Brundtlan	P Kaci Kullmann Five	P Johan J. Jakobsen	N	P Kjell Magne Bondevik	N	P Tove Strand	P Yngve Hågensen	
									SME	UN	
23 November 1994	00:00	NRK	P Thorbjørn Jagland	P Jan Petersen	P Anne Enger Lahnstein	P Stein Ørnhøi	N	N	P Hallvard Bakke	P Thorvald Stoltenberg	

=== Official party positions ===
For a 'Yes' vote	For a 'No' vote
Conservative Party; Labour Party; Progress Party	Christian Democratic Party; Centre Party; Socialist Left Party; Liberal Party; Red Electoral Alliance; Workers' Communist Party

== Results ==
=== Countrywide ===
Choice	Votes	%
For	1,389,997	47.82
Against	1,516,803	52.18
Total	2,906,800	100.00
Valid votes	2,906,800	99.88
Invalid/blank votes	3,571	0.12
Total votes	2,910,371	100.00
Registered voters/turnout	3,266,064	89.11
Source: SSB

=== By constituency ===
Constituency	Electorate	Spoilt votes	Total poll (%)	Yes (%)	No (%)
Østfold	185,441	307	163,338 (88)	87,390 (54)	75,998 (46)
Akershus	322,029	443	293,331 (91)	187,126 (64)	106,205 (36)
Oslo	360,340	497	317,585 (88)	211,550 (67)	106,035 (33)
Hedmark	146,468	215	129,674 (89)	55,367 (43)	74,307 (57)
Oppland	142,911	251	126,245 (88)	55,702 (44)	70,543 (56)
Buskerud	174,271	240	154,345 (89)	88,281 (57)	66,064 (43)
Vestfold	155,338	123	138,099 (89)	78,698 (57)	59,401 (43)
Telemark	125,401	106	110,136 (88)	46,478 (42)	63,658 (58)
Aust-Agder	73,841	68	64,927 (88)	28,805 (44)	36,122 (56)
Vest-Agder	108,226	58	96,318 (89)	43,947 (46)	52,371 (54)
Rogaland	251,790	166	227,485 (90)	103,066 (45)	124,419 (55)
Hordaland	313,511	244	281,543 (90)	122,942 (44)	158,601 (56)
Sogn og Fjordane	80,104	52	71,650 (89)	22,761 (32)	48,889 (68)
Møre og Romsdal	180,426	178	160,713 (89)	61,715 (38)	98,998 (62)
Sør-Trøndelag	194,869	239	171,007 (88)	77,035 (45)	93,972 (55)
Nord-Trøndelag	96,344	50	86,110 (89)	31,018 (36)	55,092 (64)
Nordland	183,703	226	162,474 (88)	46,394 (29)	116,080 (71)
Troms	113,840	57	101,428 (89)	28,860 (28)	72,568 (72)
Finnmark	57,211	51	50,342 (88)	12,862 (26)	37,480 (74)
Source: Dataset European Election Database

== See also ==
- Norway–European Union relations
