= Jan-Erik Støstad =

Norwegian politician

Jan-Erik Støstad (born 21 October 1953) is a Norwegian politician for the Labour Party.

In 2005, when the second cabinet Stoltenberg took office, Støstad was appointed State Secretary in the Ministry of Labour and Social Inclusion.

Having graduated in economics from the University of Oslo in 1978, he worked as a civil servant in the Ministry of Finance from 1979 to 2000 and in the Norwegian Confederation of Trade Unions from 2000 to 2005.
