= Juvente Norway =

Norwegian youth temperance organisation

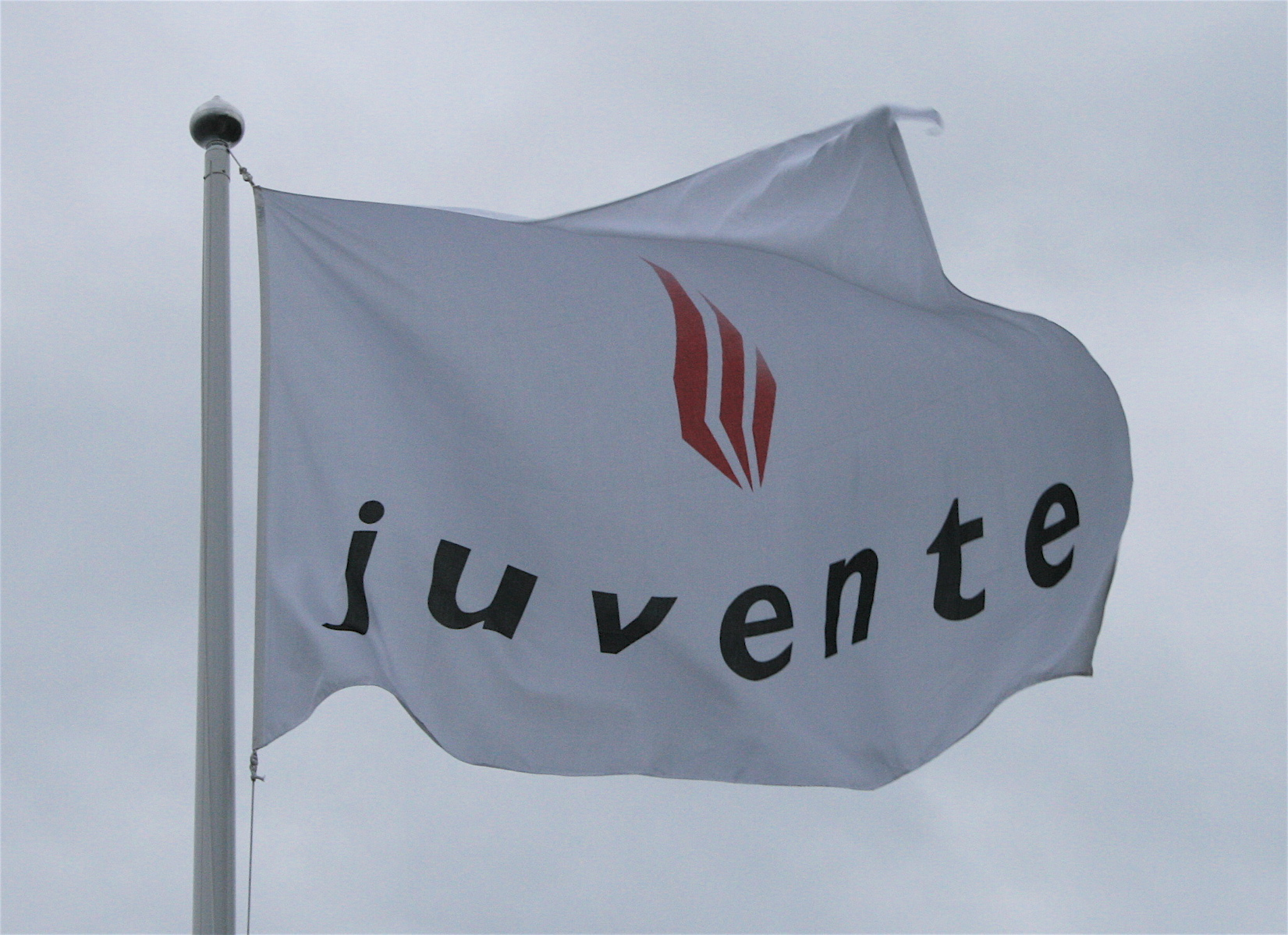
Flag

Juvente is a Norwegian youth temperance organisation, founded in 1992 after a merging between Det Norske Totalavholdsselskaps Ungdomsforbund (DNTU, founded in 1924) and Norges Godtemplar Ungdomsforbund (NGU, founded 1909). It is a member of the Nordic umbrella organisation NORDGU and the European umbrella organisation ACTIVE.
