= Sosialdemokrater mot EU =

Sosialdemokrater mot EU (English: Social Democrats against the EU) was a Norwegian interest organization which opposed a future Norwegian membership in the European Union, coupled with a Social Democrat ideology. It was special in that the Social Democrat Norwegian Labour Party, spearheaded by Prime Minister Gro Harlem Brundtland, strongly supported such a membership. Sosialdemokrater mot EU was active in 1993 and 1994, around the 1994 Norwegian European Union membership referendum where a majority rejected the membership.

Its leader was Hallvard Bakke, and its vice leader was Tove Strand Gerhardsen. Its members of the board included Anneliese Dørum.

While the Labour Party supported EU membership, their young wing Workers' Youth League was the most active organization within Sosialdemokrater mot EU. Trond Giske chaired the Workers' Youth League at that time, and many young Labour Party politicians worked as secretaries, including Anne Marit Bjørnflaten, Trond Jensrud, Synnøve Konglevoll, and Wegard Harsvik.
