= Norges Bygdeungdomslag =

Norwegian youth organization

Norges Bygdeungdomslag ("Norwegian Rural Youth") is a Norwegian youth organization, founded in 1946, aimed at promoting rural culture, and based on a Christian platform. In its heyday, it had close to 20,000 members, although the membership has now dropped to around 5,000 (as of 2020).

The organization organized many cultural and other events. It has a secretariat in Oslo with five employees, but is largely based on voluntary work.
