= No to the EU (Norway) =

Norwegian political organization opposing Norwegian accession to the European Union

- Nei til EU
- Abbreviation: NTEU
- Formation: December 31, 1990; 35 years ago
- Type: NGO
- Purpose: Activism
- Location: Oslo, Norway
- Members: ca. 18,000 (2023)
- Leader: Einar Frogner
- Website: neitileu.no

No to the EU (NTEU) (Norwegian: Nei til EU) is a Norwegian nonpartisan political organization opposed to Norwegian accession to the European Union. Formed in 1990, No to the EU successfully campaigned against EU membership in the 1994 referendum on the issue through a massive mobilization. At its peak in 1994, the organization had local chapters in every municipality and 140,000 members, though this has declined substantially to a claimed membership of over 18,000 as of 2024. Since the referendum, the organization has focused on opposing Norwegian membership in the European Economic Area and EU influence generally, and in particular the EU energy agency ACER.

== History ==
NTEU was originally founded in 1988 as the "Information Committee on Norway and the EC" (Norwegian: Opplysningsutvalget om Norge og EF) and was the latest of a number of organizations opposing the European Communities. The organization had members from across the political spectrum, though the leadership have been largely from the Centre Party and the Socialist Left Party. EU opponents in the Labor Party also had their own organization, the Social Democrats against the EU (Norwegian: Sosialdemokrater mot EU), which cooperated with NTEU.

Following slow progress in the 1960s, including a French veto against British membership, the Norwegian debate about the EC gradually escalated, culminating in a divisive 1972 referendum. The 1972 referendum eventually resulted in 53.5% of voters rejecting membership in the EC.

=== 1994 referendum ===
In the 1980s, the debate gradually appeared once more. After the formation of the European Union in 1993 as the Maastricht Treaty went into effect, the debate about membership became relevant once more as the Brundtland cabinet applied for membership and negotiated with the EU simultaneously with Sweden, Finland and Austria. It was in this context that No to the EU was formed.

In 1994, a referendum was held on EU membership following the conclusion of negotiations. By now, each side had coalesced into respective organizations: No to the EU and the European Movement (Norwegian: Europabevegelsen i Norge). No to the EU organized a massive mobilization against joining the EU. As with the 1972 referendum, practically every party was divided on the issue, with only the Conservative Party united in support; on the other hand, the Centre Party and the Socialist Left Party were strongly opposed. The campaign was primarily between competing interests; on the one hand businesses, the Labor Party leaders and the trade union leadership seeking economic integration and growth, and on the other hand rural voters like farmers and fishermen fearful of foreign competition, along with leftists critical of ceding sovereignty to the EU.

NTEU lobbied the Norwegian Confederation of Trade Unions, which now turned and opposed the EU, distributed their newspaper and encouraged people to vote. During their peak they reached 140,000 members, making them one of the largest political organizations in Norwegian history. Their case was strengthened by various factors, such as Norway already having access to the European single market through the EEA by this point, concerns about Norwegian sovereignty in the face of increased European integration, and the strong opposition of the primary sector. The ensuing 52.2% no vote in the referendum is attributed to their vigorous campaign in combination with these factors.

=== EEA and ACER opposition ===
Following their victory in the 1994 referendum, NTEU's membership drastically fell to about 20,000 in 2023, with the organization claiming over 18,000 members as of 2024. Though some within the organization supported the EEA agreement, NTEU has since focused on opposing it and other EU influence, arguing that the EEA agreement promotes privatization and undermines the Norwegian labor market and Norwegian sovereignty. Since the onset of the energy crisis in 2021, NTEU has focused especially on ACER, the EU energy agency. In 2018, they filed suit against the government alleging that the cession of sovereignty to the EU was so great that it requires a three-fourths vote under the Norwegian Constitution's paragraph 115. NTEU raised over a million Norwegian kroner for this purpose. After several defeats in the lower courts, the suit was finally dismissed unanimously by the Norwegian Supreme Court in 2023, on the grounds that the cession was minor enough to only require a regular majority.
