= Ministry of Culture and Equality =

Government ministry of Norway

Royal Ministry of Culture and Equality
- Det kongelige kultur- og likestillingsdepartement

Agency overview
- Formed: 1 January 1982
- Jurisdiction: Government of Norway
- Headquarters: Oslo
- Minister responsible: Lubna Jaffery, Minister of Culture and Equality
- Agency executive: Kristin Berge, Secretary General
- Website: www.regjeringen.no/kud

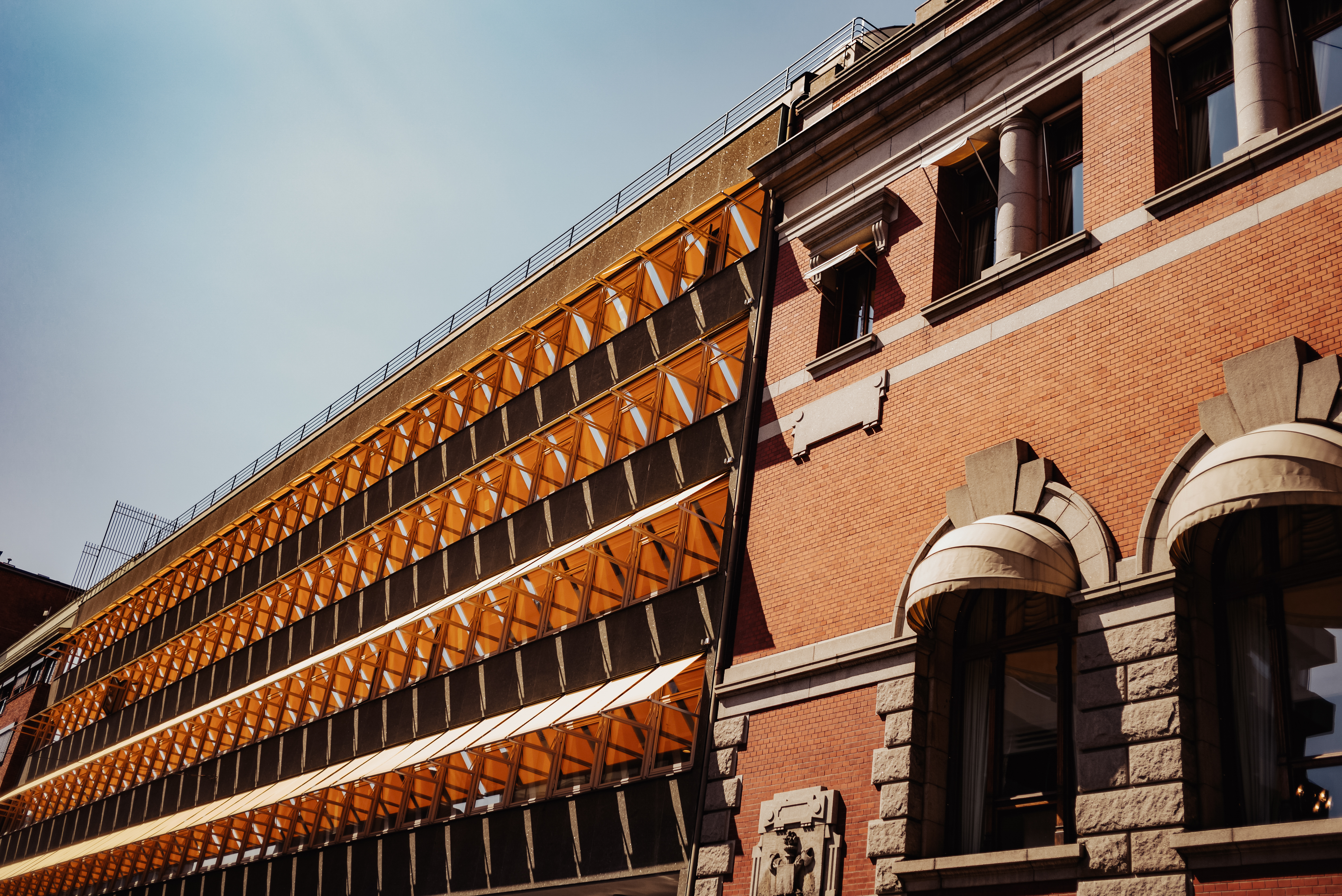
The facade of the Ministry of Culture and parts of the Supreme Court in Oslo

The Royal Norwegian Ministry of Culture and Equality (Norwegian: Det kongelige kultur- og likestillingsdepartement; short name Kultur- og likestillingsdepartementet) is responsible for cultural policy, regulations and other matters related to the media and sports, and equality and non-discrimination. The ministry was established in 1982, as the Ministry of Cultural and Science. Until then, the Ministry of Church and Education Affairs had had the overriding responsibility for cultural affairs in Norway. It is led by the Minister of Culture and Equality Lubna Jaffery (Labour) since June 2023. The Secretary-General of the ministry is Kristin Berge. The ministry reports to the Storting.

== History ==
The Ministry of Churches and Education, which was also responsible for culture, was founded in 1818. Finally, in 1982, an independent Ministry of Culture was established under the name of Kultur- og vitenskapsdepartementet (Ministry of Culture and Science). Another restructuring of responsibilities in 1990 led to the formation of a Ministry of Churches and Culture (Kirke- og kulturdepartementet) and a Ministry of Education and Research (Utdannings- og forskningsdepartementet). In 1991 responsibility for the churches was handed over again from the Ministry of Culture to the now renamed Ministry for Churches, Education and Research (Kirke-, utdannings- og forskningsdepartementet). In 2002, the Ministry of Culture received the subject area again and was given the name Kultur- og kirkedepartementet.

The ministry was called Kulturdepartementet from 2010 until the end of 2021. In 2019, responsibility for equality was transferred from the Ministry of Children and Family to the Ministry of Culture. On 1 January 2022 the ministry was renamed Kultur- og likestillingsdepartementet (Ministry of Culture and Equality).

== Organisation ==
The ministry is led by the Minister of Culture and Equality Lubna Jaffery, who represents the Labour Party. The Secretary-General of the ministry is Kristin Berge. Even Aleksander Hagen is the state secretary and Mari Hansen Ingleson is the political adviser.

=== Departments ===
The ministry is divided into six departments and an information unit.

- Department of Civil Society and Sports
- Department of Cultural Heritage
- Department of Media and the Arts
- Department for Equality, Non-discrimination and International Affairs
- Department of Administrative Affairs
- The Communication Unit

== See also ==
- Minister of Culture and Equality
- Politics of Norway
