= Ministry of Children and Families =

Government ministry of Norway

Royal Ministry of Children and Families
- Det kongelige barne- og familiedepartementet

Agency overview
- Formed: 21 December 1956; 69 years ago
- Jurisdiction: Government of Norway
- Headquarters: Oslo
- Employees: 190
- Minister responsible: Kjersti Toppe, Minister of Children and Families
- Agency executive: Emma C. Jensen Stenseth, Secretary General
- Website: Official website

Footnotes
- List of Norwegian ministries

The Royal Norwegian Ministry of Children and Families (Norwegian: Det kongelige barne- og familiedepartement; short name Barne- og familiedepartementet; BFD) is a Norwegian government ministry that is responsible for family affairs, children welfare services, Church of Norway and other religious affairs, and consumer affairs. The ministry is led by the Minister of Children and Families Kjersti Toppe.

== History ==
The ministry was established in 1956 as the Ministry of Family and Consumer Affairs. It is formally named Det kongelige barne- og familiedepartement (The Royal Ministry of Children and Families), although its short name Barne- og familiedepartementet (Ministry of Children and Families) is widely used except in formal documents, letters and affairs of state. It was merged with the Ministry of Pay and Prices in 1972 to form the Ministry of Consumer Affairs and Government Administration. It was reestablished as the Ministry of Family and Consumer Affairs in 1990 and renamed the Ministry of Children and Family Affairs in 1991. Between 2006 and 2019 the ministry held a succession of different names before returning to the name Ministry of Children and Family Affairs in 2019. As of 2021, its name is the Ministry of Children and Families.

== Political staff ==
- Minister Kjersti Toppe (Centre Party)

== Subordinate agencies ==
- Allocation Committee for support to voluntary children's and youth organizations
- County social welfare boards
- Ecolabelling Norway
- County Governors
- Market Council of Norway
- National Institute for Consumer Research
- Norway's Contact Committee for Immigrants and the Authorities
- Norwegian Assay Office
- Norwegian Consumer Council
- Norwegian Consumer Dispute Commission
- Norwegian Consumer Ombudsman
- Norwegian Directorate for Children, Youth and Family Affairs
- Norwegian Labour and Welfare Service
- Ombudsman for Children in Norway

== See also ==
- List of Norwegian Ministers of Children and Family Affairs
