= Office of the Prime Minister (Norway) =

Department of the Cabinet of Norway

- Statsministerens kontor

Agency overview
- Formed: 1956
- Jurisdiction: Government of Norway
- Headquarters: Regjeringskvartalet, Oslo
- Employees: 55
- Minister responsible: Jonas Gahr Støre
- Agency executive: Kristine Kallset, Chief of Staff
- Website: www.regjeringen.no/en/dep/smk/id875/

The Norwegian Office of the Prime Minister (Norwegian: Statsministerens kontor, abbreviated SMK) is a cabinet department that assists the Cabinet of Norway and the Prime Minister of Norway in the leadership of the Cabinet and Government. It has since 2021 been led by Prime Minister Jonas Gahr Støre (Labour Party). The State Secretary in charge of the office is Kristine Joy Nordenson Kallset. The office has about 55 employees.

== History ==
Since the establishment of the first Norwegian government, in 1814, the Prime Minister has had secretaries to help him with tasks, though these were not collectively assigned to his office until 1945. The office was given the current title in 1950, but not formally created until 1956. In 1969 the central secretariat for the entire cabinet also became part of the Office of the Prime Minister.
