= State Secretary (Norway) =

Position in the government of Norway

In Norway, a state secretary (Norwegian: statssekretær) is a partisan political position within the executive branch of government. Contrary to the position secretary of state in many other countries, a Norwegian state secretary does not head the ministry, rather, they are second in rank to a minister. Resembling a de facto vice minister, the state secretary, however, cannot attend a Council of State, and does not act as a temporary minister in case of illness or other leave of absence.

== Modern use ==
The modern state secretary institution was established in 1947, following a 78-41 vote in the Norwegian Parliament. The Labour and Communist parties voted for, whereas the Agrarian (Centre), Christian Democratic, Liberal, and Conservative parties voted against. The cabinet at that time was a single-party Labour cabinet led by Einar Gerhardsen, and one state secretary was appointed seven of the ministries. State secretaries in the Office of the Prime Minister followed in 1956, having originally been known as Secretaries to the Prime Minister. When the cabinet Lyng (Conservative, Christian Democratic, Centre, Liberal) assumed office in August 1963, they appointed state secretaries in nearly all ministries, and when the cabinet Korvald (Christian Democratic, Centre, Liberal) assumed office, it became the first cabinet to employ two state secretaries in one ministry.

In 1968 the Conservative representative Paul Thyness, himself a former state secretary, had proposed a parliamentary resolution which requested the sitting cabinet to "take the function and status of State Secretary position into closer consideration." A public reporting committee convened in 1970; in 1971 Thyness became a member of this committee. In 1972, Thyness and fellow committee member Guttorm Hansen proposed four changes to the Norwegian Constitution in order to cement the state secretary position in Norwegian law. A Norwegian Official Report was also produced; in 1974 (NOU 1974: 18). In 1976 the constitutional change was passed, following a 146-9 parliamentary vote. The only party which opposed the change was the Anders Lange Party; its four representatives voted together with individuals from other parties. One proposal was scrapped, though; the idea that state secretaries should meet in parliamentary sessions, allowing for closer scrutiny of the executive branch of government by the legislative branch.

Originally, the position was typically given to external technical experts or young politicians with little or no prior experience as elected politicians. In 1980, a landmark was made as Helen Bøsterud became the first state secretary with prior experience in parliament. However, this is still not the rule. On the other hand, becoming a member of parliament or even minister after serving as a state secretary is common. Jan P. Syse (State Secretary 1970–1971) and Kjell Magne Bondevik (State Secretary 1972–1973) would serve as prime ministers, and Thorvald Stoltenberg (State Secretary 1971–1972 and 1973–1979) and Jonas Gahr Støre (State Secretary 2000–2001) would serve as ministers of foreign affairs.

== Historical use ==
The title state secretary was first used in 1814. While Norway was still a part of Denmark, in March 1814, Crown Prince Christian Frederick created a Government Council (Regjeringsråd), with a regular secretary who was titled Secretary to the Government (Regjeringssekretær). According to the Norwegian Constitution of May 1814, the name of the Government Council was changed to Council of State, the secretary position being renamed to the state secretary at the same time. The name remained until 1925, when it was changed to Secretary to the Council of State (Statsrådsekretær). Following restructuring in 1969 and 1987, the position were transformed into a civil servant position in the Office of the Prime Minister, and is today known as Secretary to the Government (Regjeringsråd).

== List of current state secretaries ==
This is a list of the state secretaries in Støre's Cabinet. Unless otherwise noted, the term started on 14 October 2021.

Minister	State secretaries	Period	Party
Office of the Prime Minister	Kristine Joy Nordenson Kallset		Labour
Office of the Prime Minister	Astrid Scharning Huitfeldt		Labour
Office of the Prime Minister	Wegard Håkon Harsvik		Labour
Office of the Prime Minister	Thomas Boe Hornburg		Labour
Office of the Prime Minister	Tale Benedikte Jordbakke		Labour
Office of the Prime Minister	Siri Storstein Hytten		Labour
Office of the Prime Minister	Anne Marie Aanerud		Centre
Office of the Prime Minister	Andreas Bjelland Eriksen		Labour
Minister of Finance	Lars Erik Bartnes		Centre
Minister of Finance	Erling Emil Laugsand		Centre
Minister of Finance	Lars Vangen		Centre
Minister of Finance	Erlend Trygve Grimstad		Centre
Minister of Finance	Lotte Grepp Knutsen		Labour
Minister of Labour and Inclusion	Maria Schumacher Walberg		Labour
Minister of Labour and Inclusion	Truls Aronsen Wickholm		Labour
Minister of Labour and Inclusion	Nancy Herz		Labour
Minister of Fisheries and Ocean Policy	Vidar Ulriksen		Labour
Minister of Development	Bjørg Sandkjær		Centre
Foreign Minister	Finn Henrik Thune		Labour
Foreign Minister	Eivind Vad Petersson		Labour
Minister of Climate and Environment	Ragnhild Sjoner Syrstad		Labour
Minister of Children and Families	Trine Fagervik		Centre
Minister of Munincipalities and Districts	Ole Gustav Narud		Centre
Minister of Munincipalities and Districts	Kjersti Bjørnstad		Centre
Minister of Munincipalities and Districts	Nancy Charlotte Porsanger Anti		Centre
Minister of Transport	Mette Gundersen		Labour
Minister of Oil and Energy	Amund Vik		Labour
Minister of Health and Care Services	Karl Kristian Bekeng		Labour
Minister of Culture and Equality	Gry Haugsbakken		Labour
Minister of Trade and Industry	Halvard Ingebrigtsen		Labour
Minister of Trade and Industry	Janicke Andreassen		Labour
Minister of Education	Kristina Torbergsen		Labour
Minister of Education	Halvard Hølleland		Labour
Minister of Agriculture and Food	Wenche Karen Westberg		Centre
Minister of Justice and Public Security	Astrid Bergmål		Labour
