= Workers' Youth League affair =

Political scandal in Norway

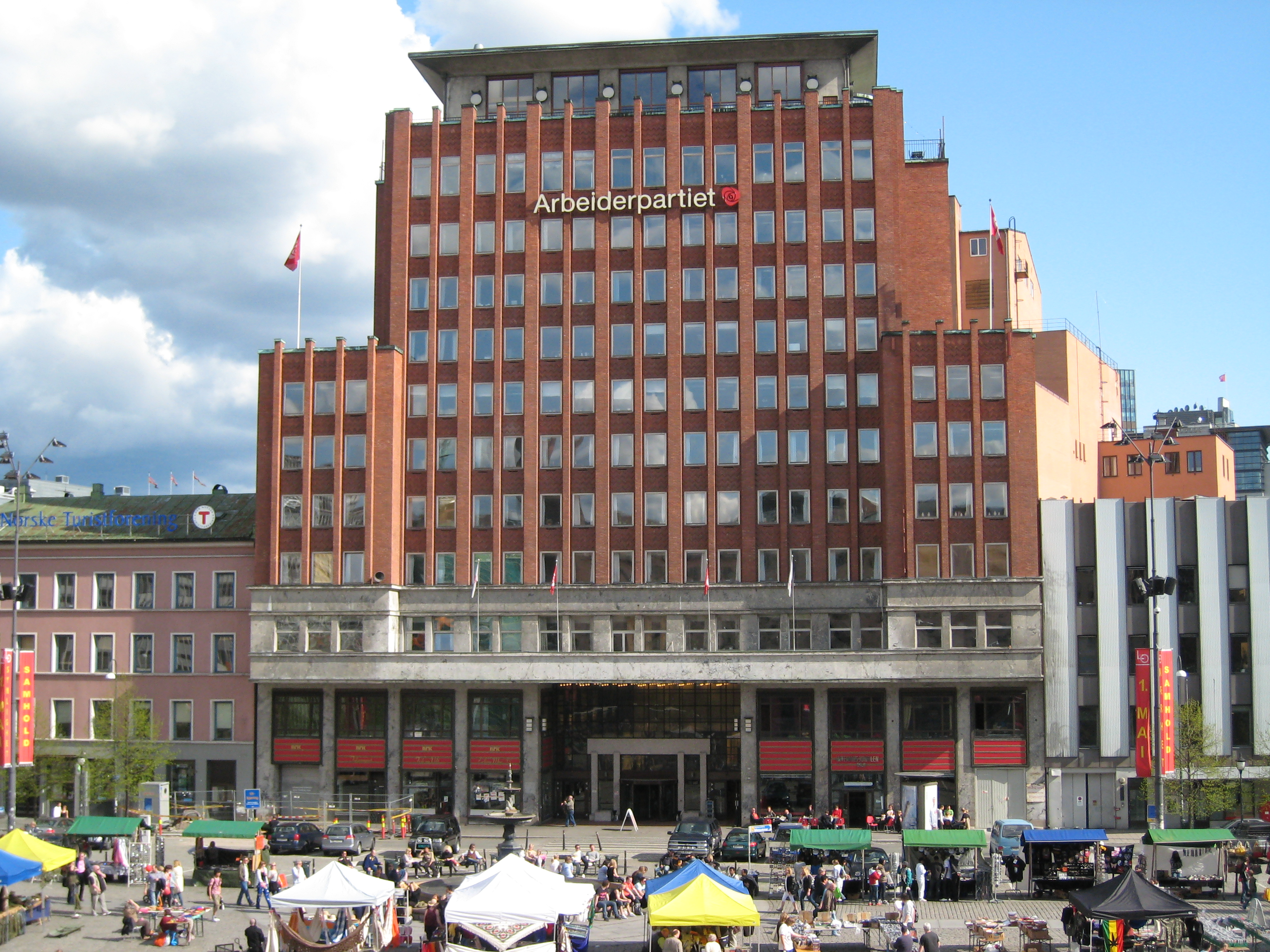
The head office of the Workers' Youth League in Oslo

The Workers' Youth League affair was a political affair, where leaders of the Workers' Youth League (AUF) were charged with deliberately inflating membership numbers to receive increased government funding. Two former treasurers and two former leaders of the Oslo chapter were found guilty of fraud, and given prison sentences, for having unlawfully received 648,000 kr in grants from the City of Oslo between 1992 and 1994. The convicted were Ragnar Bøe Elgsaas, Anders Hornslien, Bjørn Jarle Rødberg Larsen and Anders Greif Mathisen. Anders Mathisen's sentence was suspended.

== Background ==
On 2 March 1995, the newspaper Verdens Gang revealed that AUF's Oslo branch had artificially inflated their membership numbers from 1992 to 1994, and as a result received NOK 600,000 more than they were entitled to in government grants. For each new member recruited, AUF received nearly NOK 300 from the Oslo City Council. The yearly membership fee was at the time NOK 30.

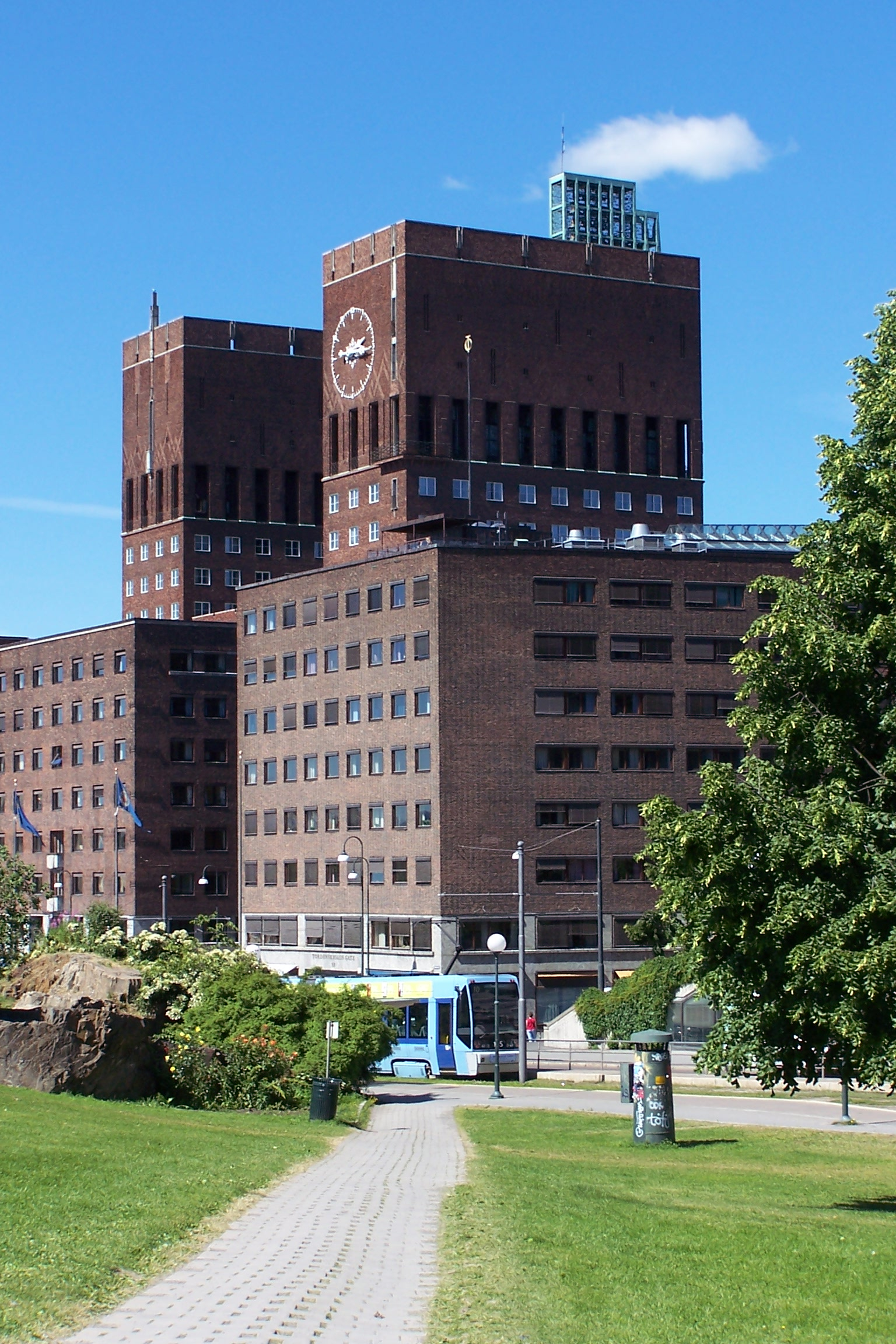
The City of Oslo was the subject of the fraud

The scam was accomplished by transferring money from AUF's main bank account into AUF-treasurer Bjørn Jarle Røberg-Larsen's private bank account, from which he then transferred money back into AUF's account to pay for new members. By doing this, AUF's membership was inflated by 2,300 between 1992 and 1994, AUF obtained more than NOK 600.000 from government funds.

== Investigation ==
On 7 March 1995, five days after the case became public the Oslo administration started an investigation into the matter. On 11 March, the leader of Oslo AUF, Ragnar Bøe Elgsaas, submitted a report to the City Council, in which he admitted to inflating the membership numbers submitted to city, and that they had later received increased grants based upon these incorrect numbers. In his report, Elgsaas referred to this practice as 'advancing' money to pay for membership fees for people whom AUF had reason to believe wanted to become members, or renew their memberships with the party. The same day as he pleaded guilty, he resigned from his position as leader of Oslo AUF.

On 14 March, former leaders of AUF, Jens Stoltenberg, the Deputy Leader of the Norwegian Labour Party at that time, and Turid Birkeland, admitted that the lying about AUF's total membership to pay for membership fees had become a common and accepted practice. On 16 March, the police started a formal criminal investigation of AUF's Oslo chapter. The Treasurer Office of the Oslo administration concluded on 20 May that AUF Oslo had wrongfully received NOK 600,000 in government grants and NOK 48,000 in seminar subsidies.

On 3 February 1996, Minister of Transport and Communications, Kjell Opseth of the Norwegian Labour Party, submitted a formal complaint to the police, in which he accused 24 other youth organisations of fraud. The accusations were divided into four different categories, which meant that there was a statute of limitations attached to some of the charges. This resulted in the acquittal of Thorbjørn Jagland (then leader of the Norwegian Labour Party) and Stoltenberg. This led to an angry outcry from the opposition parties. On 16 February, several lawyers, among them Juror Dr. Johs. Andenæs, stated that they had reacted strongly upon what they saw as the Labour Party's interference in an attempt to exempt AUF from the criminal investigation.

On 1 April 1996, formal charges were made against former treasurer Røberg Larsen, former leader Elgsaas, former leader Anders Hornslien and former treasurer Anders Greif Mathisen by prosecutor Harald Strand. On 4 June, the Oslo Young Conservatives and the Oslo's Progress Party's Youth were forced to pay back NOK 70,000 to the city. On 29 October, the police dismissed the fraud cases against the other 22 youth organisations.

== Court case and charges ==
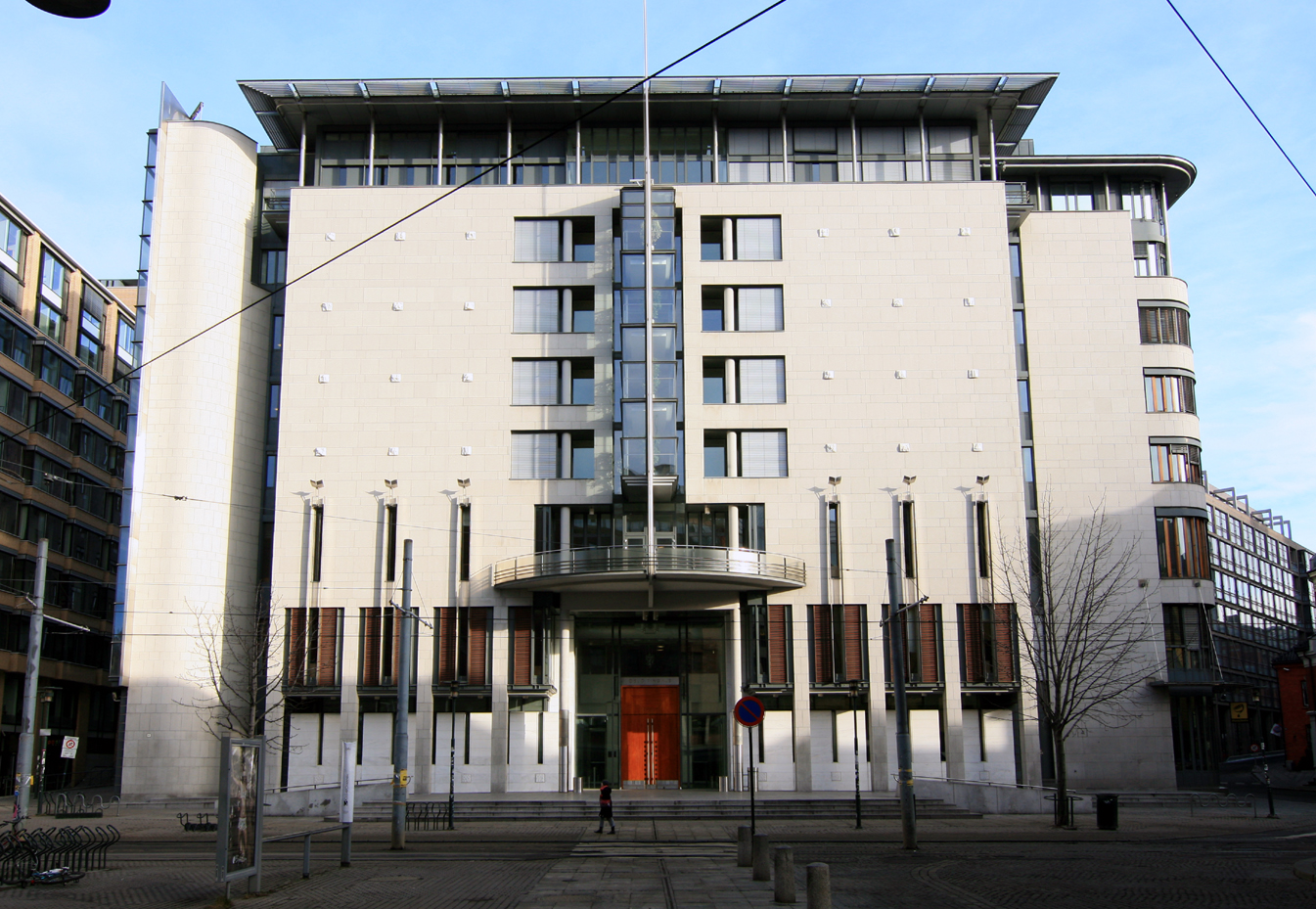
Oslo District Court

The scandal was processed by the Oslo District Court between January and March, 1998. The court was led by Judge Torjus Gard, while the head prosecutor was Atle Roaldsøy. Defendant for Bjørn Jarle Røberg-Larsen was Tor Erling Staff, while Anders Hornslien was defended by Sigurd Klomsæt, Mathisen's defender was Erik Nadheim,

The treasurer and leader of AUF Oslo between 1992 and 1994 were charged with fraud. In 1992, AUF received NOK 283,000 too much in grants, the following year NOK 210,000 too much, and in 1994, NOK 120,000. Larsen and Elgsaas were both charged for all three incidents, while Hornslien was only charged for the first, while Mathisen was charged for the two last. Larsen was also charged with embezzlement of NOK 78,000. All four pleaded not guilty.

=== City's statement ===
Borghild Heddal, responsible for the municipal's grants to youth organisations, stated that there was no room for crime. Heddal, after the investigation, said: "The City of Oslo helped these organisations. But they decided to go behind our backs and continue with something that is unheard of." She described the actions as a "betrayal of trust". The rules for the grants were sent out once per year; in addition, there was an annual seminar where these youth organisations were informed about the procedures, and she could confirm that AUF always participated on such events. Heddal pointed out that the rules were clear, and that there were no excuse to be found. She specifically mentioned that if a person chooses to not pay a membership for a given year, it would judicially be a statement that they no longer wanted to be considered members. She also commented that the rules stated that the membership had to be paid within the end of the year. After Newyears, it would not be possible to pay for membership the previous year.

=== Hornslien's statement ===
Anders Hornslien, leader of Oslo AUF from 1991 and 1993, claimed he had nothing to do with the accounts of the organisation. He stated: "I never approved such activities, and i've never supported the inflation of membership numbers." He also denied that there were made lists of such people, which were used to apply for municipal grants. He admitted that he had paid a pile of 100 giros, he did not believe it to be suspicious however. "We only paid contingents for those who had expressed that they wanted to be members of AUF, or for those whom we had reason to believe wanted to be members". He expressed, when questioned, that there was not enough time to get the money back from the people who had confirmed by telephone, since the organisation was in the middle of organising its annual congress. Those who actually did pay, were signed up as paying members the following year.

Hornslien stated in court that two former AUF leaders, Trond Giske and Turid Birkeland, pressured AUF Oslo to keep up the artificially high membership numbers. He also stated that it was pride, rather than money, that was the motivating factors for him. He continued, by telling the court that AUF Oslo was contacted on a yearly basis by the central leadership of the Labour Party, if the Labour Party leadership felt the membership was to low AUF was told to shape up.

Hornslien was eventually charged and convicted of inflating membership numbers and the unlawful appropriation of NOK 200,000 in grants. He struggled to convince the court that the main reason for paying NOK 21,000 in membership fees was not to receive NOK 210.000 in grants.

=== Elgsaas' statement ===
Ragnar Bøe Elgsaas admitted having 'advanced' membership fees for people he had not asked if they wanted to be members. Each December, the board would phone people to ask them if they wanted to renew their membership. If they said yes, they would receive a giro in the mail. Elgsaas gave himself away, when stating "if this was not the case, we would 'advance' for the member". Elgsaas later denied stating this. Of the 700 people who had been incorrectly registered as members, Elgsaas estimated that they had phoned about half of them. They used several rules of thumb to consider who wanted to be members, without actually asking them, including those who applied for membership during the year, those who had formerly had positions, those who had been to information meetings, and those whom they knew personally. He also confirmed it was impossible to recollect the NOK 30 that was advanced, because the information of who had confirmed was automatically deleted from the computer system.

The prosecution showed video evidence from a post office in the city center, where Elgaas was seen paying for the massive amount of giros. Included in this pile, was one for a woman who had reported AUF to the police in 1995, after she had attempted to leave the organisation nine times. Elgass had stated that he did not 'advance' for people who did not want to be members of the party. When questioned about the woman, he said that it could happen that they 'advanced' for the wrong person. The police had also found Elgsaas' mother's name on two of the giros. Elgsaas explained that he experienced pressure from the leader of AUF, Trond Giske, and the general secretary, Rita Ottervik, to continue with the 'advancements'.

=== Røberg-Larsen's statement ===
Bjørn Jarle Rødberg Larsen, treasurer of Oslo AUF from 1992 to 1994, had at first denied to testify in the case, after advice from his defense attorney, but chose to change his mind. He told the court that the Oslo Labour Party pressured the Oslo AUF to maintain high membership numbers, in order to maintain their strong influence within AUF. He also told the court that the four accused members tried to keep the money advancements a secret, because they all knew that the practice was illegal. He also admitted that the leadership of AUF in the years between 1992 and 1994 conspired to inflate membership numbers in order to receive higher government subsidies. The leadership regularly paid membership fees for those members who did not pay their fees. In 1993, they also decided to pay membership fees for people who had never expressed any desire to be members of AUF. He also admitted that the four of them met at Hornslien's parliament office to discuss the situation after Verdens Gang broke the story.

Unlike the other three indicted, Rødberg Larsen was also charged with embezzlement of money from several of the small, inactive chapters in Oslo. Elgsaas and Mathisen had stated that they had spent NOK 30,000 and NOK 11,000 each to 'advance' the membership fees, and had both stated that they had done this without believing they would be repaid the money. They also lent NOK 38,000 and NOK 18,000 to Rødberg Larsen to cover the deficit in the Oslo chapter. Rødberg Larsen claimed that it was Elgsaas and Mathisen that had emptied the inactive accounts, to cover their costs for the 'advancements'. He further claimed that he had only borrowed NOK 12–13,000 from Elgaas, and nothing from Mathisen. He claimed the deficit was something that Elgaas and Mathisen had imagined afterwards. When questioned about where the money from the inactive chapters had gone, Rødberg Larsen claimed that they had been used to start new chapters. When questioned about why there were no receipts for this, he stated all the receipts had either not been kept, or been stolen in a framed theft.

Rødberg Larsen made several statements which directly opposed those made by the other three indicted. He claimed the local chapters had been deliberately misled by the leadership in Oslo AUF. He also stated that the motivation to keep the membership numbers high, was to avoid that former leaders, who had become central in the Oslo Labour Party, would be discredited. He also felt that 120–130 people on "Bjørn Jarle's superlist" were people form whom 'advancements' were being made, but who they had no reason to believe actually wanted to be members of AUF. He also stated that the reason Mathisen was recruited from Akershus AUF, was that "he could be trusted regarding 'advancements'".

=== Stoltenberg's involvement ===
On 14 March 1995, twelve days after Verdens Gang published the story, Jens Stoltenberg and former leader of AUF, Turid Birkeland, admitted that 'advancing' money to pay for membership fees was a common and accepted practice at the time they were involved with the organisation.

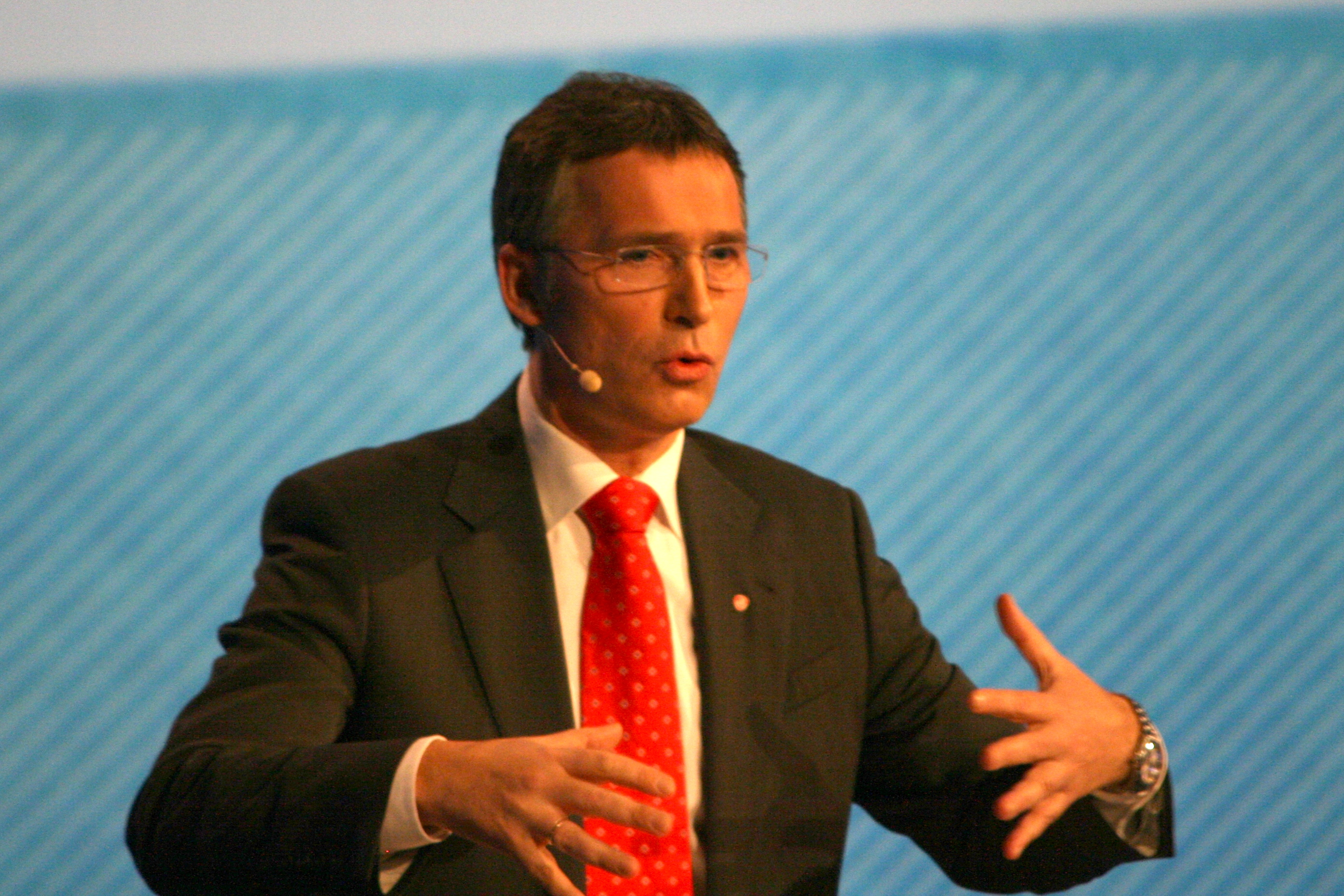
Jens Stoltenberg, Prime Minister of Norway between 2005 and 2013

However, on 17 March 1998, Stoltenberg was called to give testimony in the case. He told the Oslo District Court, under oath, that he was unfamiliar with the artificial inflating of membership figures which took place in the AUF. He also told the court that he was unaware of any form of fraud taking place in the organisation under his leadership, and stated that he had never heard of 'advancing' money to pay for memberships until Verdens Gang broke the story on 2 March 1995. He also stated that in his opinion, it was not necessarily wrong to 'advance' money for members, provided that the members in question reimbursed this fee later on.

Stoltenberg was also cross-examined by defence lawyer Tor Erling Staff, who pointed out that membership numbers for AUF during Stoltenbergs tenure, 11,000, were too high. According to Staff's calculations, such a huge membership numbers would mean that AUF had to recruit several thousand members each year. The following day, Jens Stoltenberg told the court that the government had accepted non-paying members in youth organisations as normal members for many years, provided that the membership was confirmed by word of mouth by the member in question.

=== Jagland's involvement ===
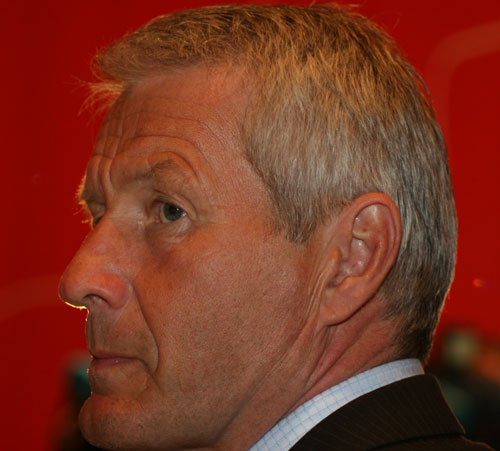
Thorbjørn Jagland, former Prime Minister of Norway (1996–97)

When Thorbjørn Jagland gave evidence in the case, he agreed with Stoltenberg that it was not necessarily wrong to 'advance' money for memberships, provided that the members in question reimbursed this fee later on. He did, however, tell the court that it was unacceptable to transfer money from AUF's main bank account to pay for membership fees. He also agreed, when pressed by the prosecutor, that membership numbers were too high when he was the leader. In his defense he stated that if AUF were to follow the law too rigidly, they would only have ended up with a quarter of the membership numbers that the Young Conservatives operated with. He said that it would have been absurd to follow the law to the letter.

He also told the court that AUF should have received even more subsidie, referring to some of the other political youth parties that used similar methods for calculating membership numbers.

=== Other involved former members ===
Turid Birkeland and Øystein Mæland, both AUF board members during Jens Stoltenberg's time as AUF leader, admitted that there had been a culture of inflating membership numbers in the organisation at the time. Stoltenberg denied any knowledge of this. Erik Solheim, former leader of Socialist Youth, admitted that also other youth parties had inflated membership numbers.

Former AUF leader, Anniken Huitfeldt, also admitted that membership numbers were too high. She told the court that the reason why AUF decided to keep up the practice of during her leadership, was to protect former members of the organisation who had contributed to this inflation. She also admitted that she was taught how to 'advance' money for membership fees when she first joined the organisation. Øystein Mæland eventually cancelled his membership with the Labour Party because he felt that the four members sentenced for their involvement in the fraud were used as scapegoats.

== Verdict ==
All four charged were convicted of fraud on 21 March 1998. In all major matters, the prosecutors submission of evidence was supported by the judge. The court felt that the fraud was the result of a planned work, and had been ongoing for several years. The court did not believe that the organisation did not have financial motives for the fraud. The court also stated that an organisation culture was not mitigating circumstances. It also stated that the leaders and treasurers had a personal responsibility. The court also felt that not following a requirement from the city issued in 1992, requiring AUF to clean up its membership register system, was in the disfavour of the indicted.

All four indicted were found guilty and had to serve prison sentences:

- Bjørn Jarle Røberg-Larsen was sentenced to six months in jail.
- Ragnar Bøe Elgsaas was sentenced to seven months in jail.
- Anders Greif Mathisen received a suspended sentence of 90 days in jail.
- Anders Hornslien was sentenced to five months in jail.

Both Mathisen and Hornslien chose to appeal to case to Borgarting Court of Appeal, but this was dismissed by the appellate court, ruling that the appeal did not have a chance to be met.
