= Praksis =

Norwegian magazine

Praksis ("Practice") is a Norwegian magazine, published by the Workers Youth League.

It was started on 15 November 1923 as Den Røde Ungdom by members of the Labour Party who had lost control of the Young Communist League of Norway and its newspaper Klassekampen. Den Røde Ungdom , a fortnightly publication, then served as the official organ of the Left Communist Youth League. When the Left Communist Youth League merged with the Socialist Youth League of Norway to form the Workers Youth League in 1927, Den Røde Ungdom absorbed the Socialist Youth League organ Arbeiderungdommen.

Later, its name was changed to Arbeiderungdommen. From 1953 to 1973 it was known as Fritt Slag, and now as Praksis.
