= Tobias Linge =

Norwegian politician

Tobias Hangaard Linge

Deputy Member of the Storting
- Incumbent
- Assumed office 1 October 2021
- Deputising for: Åsmund Aukrust (2025–)
- Constituency: Akershus

Personal details
- Born: 28 July 1997 (age 28)
- Party: Labour Party
- Occupation: Politician

Tobias Hangaard Linge (born 28 July 1997) is a Norwegian politician for the Labour Party.

He served as a deputy representative to the Parliament of Norway from Akershus during the term 2021–2025. He moved up to regular representative after Åsmund Aukrust entered Støre's Cabinet. He was re-elected deputy representative to the Storting for the period 2025–2029, and thus continued to meet as substitute for Åsmund Aukrust. Hailing from Grav in Bærum, he became leader of Akershus Workers' Youth League in 2018.
