= Hans Raastad =

Norwegian socialist (born 1943)

Hans Raastad (born 8 May 1943 in Skien) was a leader of the Workers' Youth League in Norway from 1969 to 1971. He succeeded Ola Teigen.

== See also ==
- Framfylkingen
