= Trygve Bratteli =

26th Prime Minister of Norway

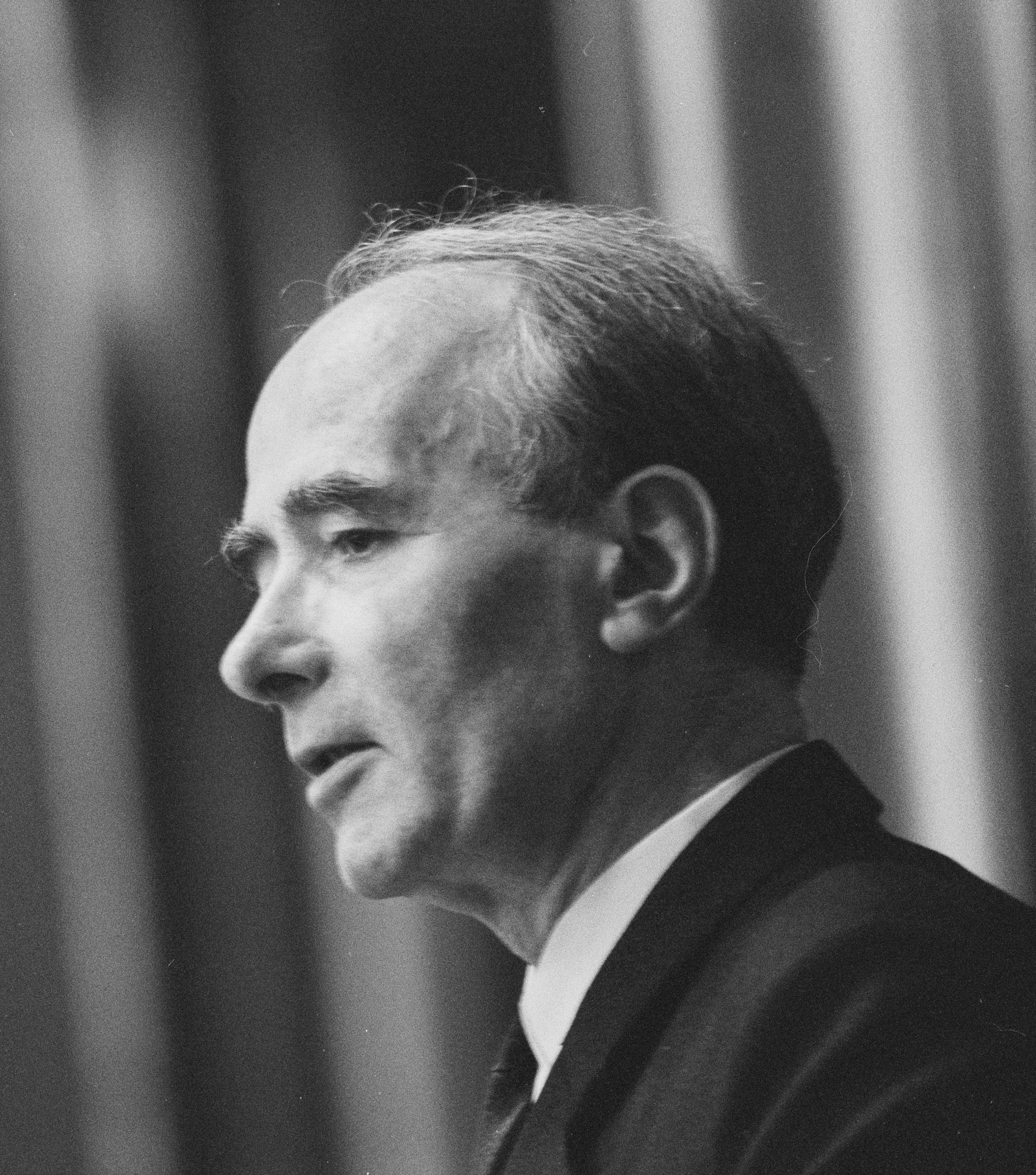
- Bratteli in 1971

Prime Minister of Norway
- In office 16 October 1973 – 15 January 1976
- Monarch: Olav V
- Preceded by: Lars Korvald
- Succeeded by: Odvar Nordli
- In office 17 March 1971 – 18 October 1972
- Monarch: Olav V
- Preceded by: Per Borten
- Succeeded by: Lars Korvald

President of the Nordic Council
- In office 1 June 1978 – 17 September 1978
- Preceded by: V. J. Sukselainen
- Succeeded by: Olof Palme

Leader of the Labour Party
- In office 1965–1975
- Deputy: Reiulf Steen
- Preceded by: Einar Gerhardsen
- Succeeded by: Reiulf Steen

Minister of Finance
- In office 28 December 1956 – 23 April 1960
- Prime Minister: Einar Gerhardsen
- Preceded by: Mons Lid
- Succeeded by: Petter Jakob Bjerve
- In office 19 November 1951 – 22 January 1955
- Prime Minister: Oscar Torp
- Preceded by: Olav Meisdalshagen
- Succeeded by: Mons Lid

Minister of Transport and Communications
- In office 25 September 1963 – 20 January 1964
- Prime Minister: Einar Gerhardsen
- Preceded by: Lars Leiro
- Succeeded by: Erik Himle
- In office 23 April 1960 – 28 August 1963
- Prime Minister: Einar Gerhardsen
- Preceded by: Kolbjørn Varmann
- Succeeded by: Lars Leiro

Member of the Norwegian Parliament
- In office 1 January 1950 – 30 September 1981
- Deputy: Hjalmar Larsen; Omar Gjesteby; Gunnar Alf Larsen; Trygve Bull; Thorbjørn Berntsen
- Constituency: Oslo

Personal details
- Born: Trygve Martin Bratteli; 11 January 1910 Nøtterøy, Vestfold, Norway
- Died: 20 November 1984 (aged 74) Oslo, Norway
- Party: Labour
- Spouse: Randi Larssen (1924–2002)
- Children: 3, including Ola Bratteli
- Education: University of Oslo

Trygve Martin Bratteli (11 January 1910 – 20 November 1984) was a Norwegian newspaper editor, a politician with the Norwegian Labour Party, and Nazi concentration camp survivor. He served as the prime minister of Norway from 1971 to 1972 and again from 1973 to 1976. He was president of the Nordic Council in 1978.

== Background ==
Bratteli was born on the island of Nøtterøy in Nøtterøy Municipality in Vestfold, Norway (now part of Færder Municipality). His parents were Terje Hansen Bratteli (1878–1966) and Martha Barmen (1880–1938). He attended school locally, having many jobs including: work in fishing, as a coal miner and on a building site. Over a 9- to 10-month period, Bratteli travelled with whalers to Antarctica, where he worked in a guano factory at South Georgia Island. He was a student at the socialist school at Malmøya in 1933. Oscar Torp, chairman of the Norwegian Labour Party, asked him to become editor of Folkets Frihet in Kirkenes and later editor of Arbeiderungdommen which was published by the Socialist Youth League of Norway. For a period during 1940, he also served as Secretary of the Norwegian Labour Party.

Following the Nazi invasion of Norway, the daily newspaper Arbeiderbladet was closed down during 1940 by Nazi officials. Bratteli subsequently participated in the Norwegian resistance movement. He was arrested by agents of Nazi Germany in 1942, and was a Nacht und Nebel prisoner of various German concentration camps; including Natzweiler-Struthof, from 1943 to 1945. He was also imprisoned in the Sachsenhausen concentration camp, north of Berlin. He was liberated from Vaihingen an der Enz concentration camp on 5 April 1945, by the Swedish Red Cross White Buses along with fifteen other Norwegians who had survived.

== Political career ==
After the liberation of Norway in 1945, Bratteli was appointed as secretary of the Labour Party. He became chairman of the Workers' Youth League, vice chairman of the party, served on the newly formed defence commission, and in 1965; was made chairman of the Labour Party. Bratteli was elected to the Norwegian Parliament from Oslo in 1950, and was re-elected on seven occasions.

He was appointed as minister of finance in Oscar Torp's cabinet, and from 1956 to 1960 in the third cabinet of Einar Gerhardsen. From 1960 to 1963, during Gerhardsen's third period as prime minister, he was minister of transport and communications. He was also acting minister of finance from January–February 1962. In September 1963, when Gerhardsen's fourth cabinet was formed, Bratteli was again made minister of transport and communications, a post he held until 1964.

The centre-right cabinet of Borten held office from 1965 to 1971, but when it collapsed, Bratteli became prime minister. In social policy, Bratteli's premiership saw the passage of a law in June 1972 that lowered the pension age to 67. Central to his political career was the question of Norway's membership of the European Community. Following the close rejection of membership in the 1972 referendum, his cabinet resigned. However, the successor cabinet Korvald only lasted one year, and the second cabinet Bratteli was formed following the 1973 Norwegian parliamentary election. Bratteli resigned as prime minister in January 1976 on the grounds of ill health. He was succeeded by fellow Labour member Odvar Nordli.

== Personal life ==
Trygve Bratteli was married to Randi Helene Larssen. They had three children. Bratteli's memoirs of his experiences in Nazi concentration camps was published in 1980. He died in 1984 and was buried at Vestre gravlund in Oslo. Trygve Bratteli was a member of Friends of Israel within the Norwegian Labour Movement (Venner av Israel i Norsk Arbeiderbevegelse) which planted a forest to his memory in Israel.

== See also ==
- Einar Gerhardsen
- Reiulf Steen

== Notes ==
- Thirteen Norwegians died at Vaihingen and were buried in a mass grave, according to: Ottosen, Kristian (2001-07-02). "Gjensyn med Vaihingen". Aftenposten (in Norwegian).

Political offices
Preceded by Olav Meisdalshagen	Norwegian Minister of Finance; 1951–1955	Succeeded by Mons Lid
Preceded by Mons Lid	Norwegian Minister of Finance; 1956–1960	Succeeded by Petter Jakob Bjerve
Preceded by Kolbjørn Sigurd Werner Varmann	Norwegian Minister of Transport and Communications; 1960–1963	Succeeded by Lars Leiro
Preceded by Lars Leiro	Norwegian Minister of Transport and Communications; 1963–1964	Succeeded by Erik Himle
Preceded by Per Borten	Prime Minister of Norway; 1971–1972	Succeeded by Lars Korvald
Preceded by Lars Korvald	Prime Minister of Norway; 1973–1976	Succeeded by Odvar Nordli
Party political offices
Preceded by Ole Øisang	Party secretary of the Labour Party; 1945	Succeeded by Haakon Lie
Preceded by Gunnar Sand	Chairman of the Workers' Youth League; 1945–1946 (acting)	Succeeded by Rolf Åkervik
Preceded by Einar Gerhardsen	Chairman of the Norwegian Labour Party; 1965–1975	Succeeded by Reiulf Steen
