= Eskil Pedersen =

Norwegian politician (born 1984)

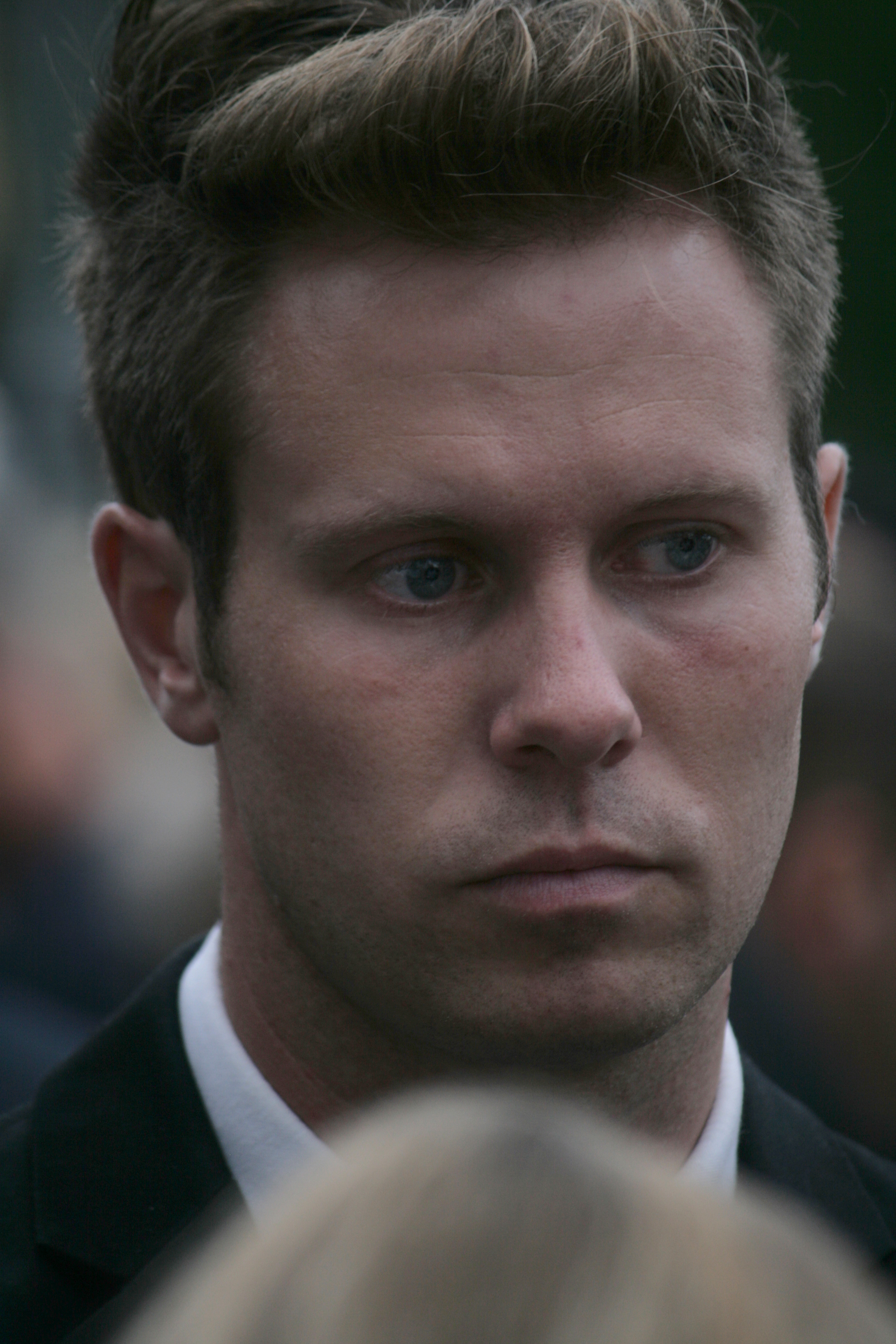
- Pedersen in 2011

Leader of the Workers' Youth League
- In office 17 October 2010 – 19 October 2014
- Deputy: Åsmund Grøver Aukrust
- Preceded by: Martin Henriksen
- Succeeded by: Mani Hussaini

Deputy Leader of the Workers' Youth League
- In office 22 October 2006 – 17 October 2010
- Leader: Martin Henriksen
- Preceded by: Martin Henriksen
- Succeeded by: Åsmund Grøver Aukrust

Personal details
- Born: 6 March 1984 (age 42) Skien, Norway
- Party: Labour

Eskil Pedersen (born 6 March 1984) is a Norwegian politician and former leader of the Workers' Youth League (AUF) from 2010 to 2014, the youth organisation associated with Norway's leading Labour Party.

Pedersen survived the massacre on the Workers' Youth League summer camp at Utøya on 22 July 2011. Many have accused Pedersen of treason due to him commanding the Utøya ferry to leave without other victims. Although leaders of AUF are never anonymous, his role in the aftermath as a representative for the organisation has caused a vast increase in media exposure, particularly in the months following the attacks. Anders Behring Breivik, the perpetrator of the attacks, stated that Pedersen was one of his three primary targets.

== Early life and education ==
Born in Skien in Telemark, Pedersen studied towards a bachelor's degree in political science, and studied courses in European and American studies at the University of Oslo. He was also elected as the first openly gay leader of the Workers' Youth League.

== Political career ==
He served as the leader of AUF in Telemark (2001–2004) and Oslo (2006–2008). He was elected deputy leader of AUF from 2006 to 2010. Pedersen was a board member in the Telemark branch of No to the EU, and has served as a political advisor to AUF on election campaigns and environmental matters. He also served as deputy member of the Oslo city council between 2007 and 2011.

=== Leader of the Workers' Youth League ===
Eskil Pedersen became the leader of AUF when he was elected to the post on 17 October 2010, narrowly defeating Åsmund Aukrust for the leadership. Pedersen succeeded Martin Henriksen who was later appointed senior advisor to the Minister of Fisheries and Coastal Affairs Lisbeth Berg-Hansen. Under Pedersens tenure as leader, the organization experienced a sharp upsurge in membership numbers, more than doubling in size from since 2003, and established itself as Norway's by far largest youth organization. He was reelected to a second term as leader in October 2012.

In May 2012, he publicly declared his intent to run for parliament by accepting a nomination by his local party chapter of Skien to the Telemark district list at the upcoming 2013 parliamentary election. He would seek the seat of retiring veteran Sigvald Hansen, however according to analysts he would face stiff competition to secure the party nomination. Among his challengers in the primary were health department state-secretary Robin Kåss and the recently elected mayor of Hjartdal Municipality, Sven Løkslid. He was however quickly endorsed both by the AUF and his local Skien party chapter.

It soon became apparent that Pedersen would be a controversial choice, the Labour party chapters from Porsgrunn Municipality, Bamble Municipality, and the eastern Telemark chapters vehemently opposed his nomination. This was partly due to him living and working in Oslo, but also because he was born in Skien, a city which was already represented in the parliament. Pedersen responded by vowing to relocate to Porsgrunn in Telemark should he be elected. On 24 November 2012 he lost the nomination to dark horse candidate Christian Tynning-Bjørnø. In March 2014, Pedersen announced his resignation, saying that he would not seek re-election as leader of the AUF.

== Political views ==
=== Progress Party ===
Pedersen is an outspoken opponent to the policies of the Progress Party. In May 2011, he pressed criminal charges against member of parliament Christian Tybring-Gjedde based on the a statement the latter made regarding integration in Groruddalen. The charges were dismissed by the police.

In 2013, Pedersen compared Progress Party leader Siv Jensen to the evil antagonist Sauron from The Lord of the Rings. The comments were in the run-up to the 2013 parliamentary election, which Pedersen described as a "struggle between good and evil".

=== Labor rights ===
A staunch trade unionist, Pedersen has actively campaigned against legislation aimed at relaxing existing labour laws. He has voiced fierce opposition to the EU Temporary Agency Work Directive. He has called for tougher penalties, including prison time, for employment agencies which were found to exploit their employees, as well as being involved in social dumping. He has called for the Norwegian government to end economical ties to international corporations who violated Norwegian labour laws.

=== LGBT rights ===
Pedersen is openly gay since coming out at the age of 18. Since that time, he has been a vocal proponent of LGBT rights, as well as being one of Norway's most high-profile LGBT figures. He frequently appears in the annual Gay Pride through Oslo. When in April 2014, the Ecclesiastical Synod of the Church of Norway decided against the introduction of special liturgy for same-sex marriage, Pedersen called it a "shameful stain" on the Church. Pedersen, who is still a member, said he himself hopes to one day be legally married in the church.

== Utøya massacre ==
On 22 July, the day of the 2011 Norway attacks, Eskil Pedersen was present at the annual AUF summer camp on Utøya. As leader of the organization he was one of the assailant, Anders Behring Breivik's, stated targets, along with former prime minister Gro Harlem Brundtland, who was there that day but had left the island before the killer arrived. Breivik would later state that he had studied Pedersen's physical appearance and facial attributes to be able to recognize him during the attack.

Very soon after the shooting erupted, Pedersen, along with his political aide, sought refuge on the ferry MS Thorbjørn, and along with seven other people decided to make their escape from the island. Pedersen later stated that while being at the Hønefoss police headquarters he feared a coup d'etat had taken place, and that he could not trust any member of the police. In an interview with TV2 he stated: "I thought the entire country was under attack [...] if we docked anywhere we would be killed."

=== M/S Thorbjørn controversy ===
There has been widespread speculation in forums and independent blogs about the conduct on the ferry, but most professional media outlets have been cautious in their coverage of the events on the MS Thorbjørn. A news website, Nettavisen, published a story raising questions about the conduct a day after the massacre, but received fierce reactions from other members of the press as well as the AUF itself.

In 2012, Adrian Pracon, a survivor and employee of AUF who himself was wounded, wrote of his reaction to seeing the ferry leave in a book describing his ordeal. One section describes his disbelief and disappointment of seeing M/S Thorbjørn head away from the island, depriving him of hope of escape. The 22-year-old from Telemark (Pracon) later underscored that the passage in the book was not intended as criticism of Eskil Pedersen or the crew of M/S Thorbjørn.

Another survivor of the massacre, 20-year-old Bjørn Ihler from Oslo, said of Pedersen in an interview with the BBC: "This was the leader of the group, it was as if the Captain abandoned his ship"., but later stated that his quotes were part of a broader context, and that he had described his feelings of being abandoned, more than criticising the actions. Pedersen defended his actions in the same programme, stating: "I think I acted normally given the situation. I acted according to instinct. I did what I was told and boarded the boat" and countered "I have been criticized for my actions, and for my views on the multicultural society by people who support the gunman's views".

The movements of MS Thorbjørn were subject to investigation as a part of the broader inquiry into the attacks by the official July 22 Commission. In the Gjørv Report, the police received harsh criticism for failing to utilize the ferry early in the rescue effort. The report states that when contacting the police immediately after leaving Utøya both the captain and other passengers received instructions to flee to safety.

The controversy flared up again in September 2012 due to comments by Brynjar Meling, a high-profile lawyer in the case whose office represents a few dozen of the affected, both AUF-members and relatives of the deceased. He claimed some of his clients questioned Pedersen's leadership of the organization but felt unable to communicate this publicly. Furthermore, Meling claimed that his clients felt that Pedersen's actions during the massacre should have consequences for his future career, and that they were frustrated by the AUF leadership's insistence that the organization as a whole was united behind Pedersen.

The comments immediately caused a fiery reaction from the AUF as well as the Labour party. Secretary-General of the Labour Party Raymond Johansen responded to Meling saying he felt "nauseated and furious" at him; other politicians used more profane expressions. Meling responded by accusing Johansen and the Labour party of attempting to stifle the debate as well as depriving the survivors of the opportunity to ask critical questions. Leaders of rival parties subsequently defended Pedersen, calling the criticism "tasteless". A former senior member of the Labour party and AUF who lost her younger sister in the massacre described how she was prevented from raising questions within the party regarding the incident. She claimed that: "MS Thorbjørn and Eskil Pedersen were not to be discussed, it was completely taboo". She since left the party altogether in protest.

=== Refurbishing of Utøya ===
In September 2012, a mother who lost her son during the Utøya massacre asked Pedersen to resign as AUF leader, citing that the plans for refurbishing Utøya "once more shows that he is not an adequate leader". The $10.4 million refurbishing plans have been criticized by several leading Norwegian psychiatrists. One survivor of the massacre called the plans "Shocking and inhuman". In addition, other survivors and relatives have expressed frustration and that they find it difficult that AUF would be resuming its summer-camp and political activity on that site, with one mother who lost her daughter proclaiming: "one does not hold a barbecue on a graveyard".

Pedersen stated that despite some opposition the refurbishing plans had wide support within the AUF. The leader of the national July 22 victims group said the plans "looked good". However, on 25 September some 200 survivors and relatives of the deceased signed a petition calling for the plans to be scrapped and for a national memorial to be established on the island. The following day, the local authorities ordered the plans to be halted pending further consultation with the victims and relatives.

== Personal life ==
Pedersen currently lives and works in Oslo. After resigning from AUF, he became the new Information Director for the agricultural cooperative Nortura.

Due to receiving an increased number of threats on SMS, Facebook, phone and in writing, Pedersen currently has a direct Police security alarm. In December 2012, a 40-year-old man was convicted of sending threatening text messages to Eskil Pedersen. He was fined the equivalent of approximately US$700, and given a suspended prison sentence. A Christian, Pedersen is a member of the Church of Norway.

Party political offices
Preceded by Martin Henriksen	Leader of the Workers' Youth League; 2010–2014	Succeeded by Mani Hussaini
