= Arbeiderungdommen (1923–1927) =

Norwegian newspaper

Arbeiderungdommen ("The Worker Youth") was a Norwegian newspaper, published in Oslo, from 1923.

Arbeiderungdommen was an organ for the Socialist Youth League of Norway. When the Socialist Youth League of Norway merged with the Left Communist Youth League to form the Workers Youth League in 1927, Arbeiderungdommen was incorporated into Den Røde Ungdom, which later changed its name to Arbeiderungdommen. From 1953 to 1973 it was known as Fritt Slag, and now as Praksis.
