= Beret Bråten =

Norwegian politician (born 1965)

Beret Bråten (born 27 February 1965) is a Norwegian sociologist, political scientist and Labour Party politician. She was deputy leader of the Labour Party's youth wing, the Workers' Youth League (1992–1994), and was a political adviser in the Prime Minister's Office and a close confidant of prime minister Thorbjørn Jagland during his tenure from 1996 to 1997. From 2020 she is vice president of the Norwegian Association for Women's Rights. Bråten holds a PhD in political science and is a senior researcher at the Fafo Foundation and an associate professor at the University of Oslo.

== Political career ==
A member of the Labour Party, she was a deputy member of the Norwegian parliament, the Storting, from 1985 to 1989. She was the deputy leader of the Labour Party's youth wing, the Workers' Youth League, from 1992 to 1994, and was the candidate of the party's pro-EU faction for the leadership position in 1992, when she lost to Trond Giske.

She was a close confidant and adviser of Thorbjørn Jagland during his tenure as leader of the Labour Party and Prime Minister in the 1990s. She was a political adviser in the Prime Minister's Office during Jagland's tenure as prime minister from 1996 til 1997 and was described as one of his closest confidants, alongside state secretary and chief of staff Britt Schultz and cabinet ministers Grete Knudsen and Ranveig Frøiland.

From 2020 she is vice president of the Norwegian Association for Women's Rights.

== Academic career ==
After leaving full-time politics, Bråten entered academia. She holds a master's degree in sociology and a PhD in political science from the University of Oslo. She has been a senior researcher at the Fafo Foundation since 2013 and is also an associate professor at the University of Oslo. Together with then-minister of justice Knut Storberget she published the book Bjørnen sover on domestic violence in 2007.

Preceded by Geir Axelsen	Deputy leader of the Workers' Youth League; 1992–1994	Succeeded by Anniken Huitfeldt
Preceded by Randi Reese	Vice President of the Norwegian Association for Women's Rights; 2020–	Succeeded by
