= Paul Engstad =

Norwegian writer and politician

Paul Øistein Engstad (13 October 1926 – 13 May 2012) was a Norwegian writer and politician for the Labour Party.

He was born in Sauda. He was a journalist in the Labour-aligned newspaper Arbeiderbladet, and held several positions in the Labour Party as organizational secretary and information director in the parliamentary group. From 1976 to 1980 he was a part of Nordli's Cabinet as State Secretary in the Office of the Prime Minister. He was known as one of the closest allies of party secretary Haakon Lie, and was accused of being instrumental in the political surveillance of socialists and communists in Norway during the Cold War, however, he strenuously denied this and nothing was proven.

From 1980 to 1983, Engstad was a press and cultural counsellor at the Norwegian embassy in Tel Aviv, Israel. He issued a travel handbook on Israel in 1990. He chaired the friendship association Friends of Israel in the Norwegian Labour Movement (Norwegian: Venner av Israel i Norsk Arbeiderbevegelse).

After serving at the embassy in Israel, he was the secretary-general in the association Folk og Forsvar, which promotes the public understanding of military affairs, until his retirement in 1992. He also edited their magazine Folk og Forsvar, and continued to do so for some time after retiring. He also wrote several books, such as the 50-year history of Framfylkingen in 1984 and the 100-year history of the Norwegian Officers' Union in 1996. He also wrote two books about Trygve Bratteli, in 1984 (together with Guttorm Hansen) and 1987, and issued a collection of Bratteli's speeches in 1985. Engstad died in 2012.
