= Anne Enger =

Norwegian politician (born 1949)

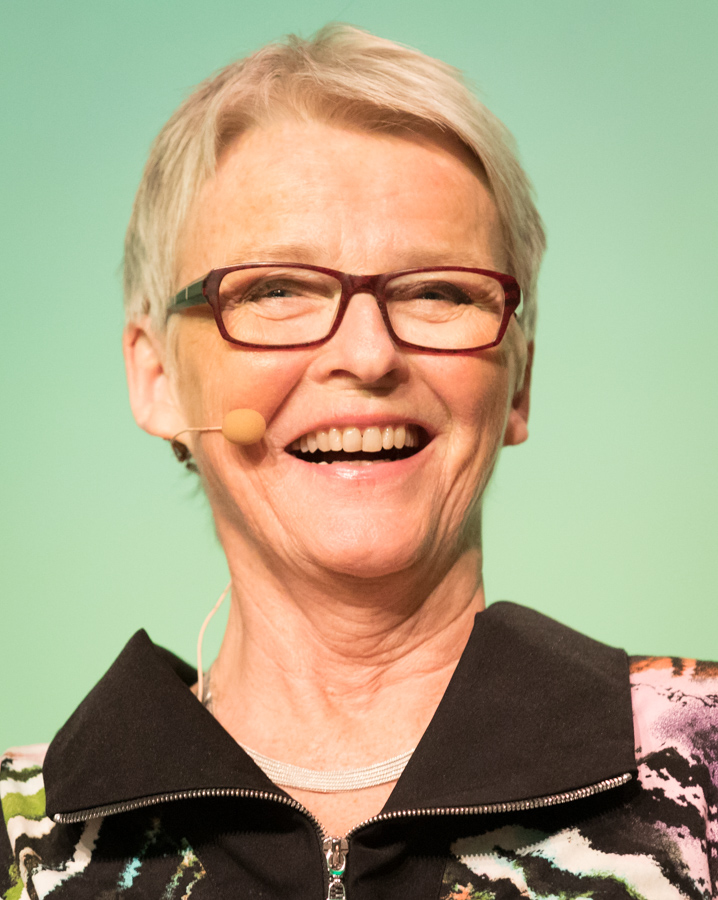
- Enger in 2017

Prime Minister of Norway
- Acting
- Covering duties 31 August 1998 – 24 September 1998
- Monarch: Harald V
- Prime Minister: Kjell Magne Bondevik

Deputy to the Prime Minister of Norway
- In office 17 October 1997 – 8 October 1999
- Prime Minister: Kjell Magne Bondevik
- Preceded by: Kjell Magne Bondevik (1986)
- Succeeded by: Odd Roger Enoksen

County Governor of Østfold
- In office 2004–2015
- Preceded by: Edvard Grimstad
- Succeeded by: Trond Rønningen

Minister of Culture
- In office 17 October 1997 – 8 October 1999
- Prime Minister: Kjell Magne Bondevik
- Preceded by: Turid Birkeland
- Succeeded by: Åslaug Haga

Leader of the Centre Party
- In office 31 March 1991 – 14 March 1999
- Preceded by: Johan J. Jakobsen
- Succeeded by: Odd Roger Enoksen

Personal details
- Born: 9 December 1949 (age 76) Trøgstad, Østfold, Norway
- Party: Centre
- Education: Rogaland College

Anne Enger, formerly Anne Enger Lahnstein (born 9 December 1949), is a Norwegian politician who served as County Governor of Østfold from 2004 until 2015, and Leader of the Centre Party from 1991 to 1999, with opposition to the European Union. She was the front person of the successful "No to EU" campaign at the 1994 referendum. She was also the leader in the failed campaign against elective abortion in Norway in the late 1970s.

She served as Minister of Culture 1997–2000; and for three weeks in 1998, she was Acting Prime Minister of Norway, during Kjell Magne Bondevik's sick leave.

Party political offices
Preceded by Johan Jakobsen	Leader of the Centre Party; 1991–1999	Succeeded by Odd Roger Enoksen
Political offices
Preceded by Turid Birkeland	Minister of Culture; 1997–1999	Succeeded by Åslaug Haga
Preceded by Kjell Magne Bondevik	Prime Minister of Norway; Acting; 1998	Succeeded by Kjell Magne Bondevik
Preceded by Edvard Grimstad	County Governor of Østfold; 2003–2015	Succeeded by Trond Rønningen
