= Eva Kristin Hansen =

Norwegian politician (born 1973)

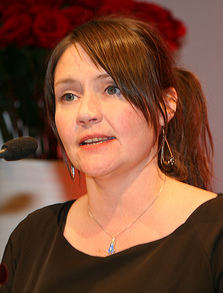
- Hansen in March 2012

President of the Storting
- In office 9 October 2021 – 23 November 2021
- Monarch: Harald V
- Prime Minister: Erna Solberg; Jonas Gahr Støre
- Preceded by: Tone W. Trøen
- Succeeded by: Masud Gharahkhani

First Vice President of the Storting
- In office 7 October 2017 – 30 September 2021
- President: Olemic Thommessen; Tone W. Trøen
- Preceded by: Marit Nybakk
- Succeeded by: Svein Harberg

Member of the Norwegian Parliament
- Incumbent
- Assumed office 1 October 2005
- Constituency: Sør-Trøndelag

Member of the Trondheim City Council
- In office 14 March 2003 – 20 March 2005

Leader of the Workers' Youth League
- In office 22 October 2000 – 8 September 2002
- Deputy: Gry Larsen
- Preceded by: Anniken Huitfeldt
- Succeeded by: Gry Larsen

Personal details
- Born: 5 March 1973 (age 53) Trondheim, South Trøndelag, Norway
- Party: Labour
- Education: Norwegian University of Science and Technology

Eva Kristin Hansen (born 5 March 1973 in Trondheim) is a Norwegian politician for the Labour Party. She briefly served as the President of the Storting from October to November 2021. She has also served as an MP for South Trøndelag since 2005. She was also leader of the Workers' Youth League from 2000 to 2002.

== Career ==
=== Youth League ===
From 2000 to 2002, she was the leader of the Workers' Youth League, the youth wing of the Labour Party.

=== Parliament (2005–present) ===
She was elected to the Norwegian Parliament from Sør-Trøndelag in 2005.

Following the 2017 election, she was proposed as the Labour Party's candidate for President of the Storting as an alternative to incumbent Conservative Olemic Thommessen, who had faced harsh criticism for his handling of the budget in regards to renovations of the Storting. Hansen was eventually not elected, but became First Vice President instead. She was again the party's candidate for the same position following the 2021 election, which the Labour Party parliamentary group unanimously agreed to. The Storting voted to confirm her to the post on 9 October, with 160 in favour and 8 abstaining. Hansen is the first Storting president to hail from Trøndelag since Guttorm Hansen in 1973.

==== President of the Storting (Oct–Sep 2021) ====
Upon becoming President of the Storting, Hansen vowed to clean up in the cases where Storting representatives benefited from economical goods. She expressed fear that it might lead to further disdain for politicians in Norway. She also stressed the importance a lot of the political work would happen in the Storting rather through government ministries, saying it would "really become a revitalization of the Storting's work".

After Olaug Bollestad called for a change in the rules to allow breastfeeding in the Storting chamber, Hansen said she never said it wasn't allowed and nothing in the rules explicitly said anything for or against it. She said it would be a topic at an upcoming meeting with the parliamentary leaders.

Verdens Gang revealed in November that Hansen had violated the parliamentary commuter home rules. She resided in Ski, while living in Trondheim. Hansen issued an apology, and admitted that she had misunderstood the rules. Hansen further stated that she wasn't a "crook" and that she hadn't intended to do anything wrong.

After the Oslo police launched an investigation into the breach of rules from multiple MPs, Hansen announced that she would resign as president of the Storting, also assuming that she was one of the said MPs. She formally resigned on 23 November. The police later confirmed that Hansen was not a suspect in their investigation. Her lawyer, John Christian Elden, stated that the selection of a new President of the Storting should be postponed, and that Hansen had resigned on wrong premises. The police provided her with a security detail after she had received death threats as a result of the investigation. The Oslo public prosecutor dropped the case on 21 December 2022.

=== Local politics ===
On the local level she was a member of Trondheim city council from 2003 to 2005. From 1995 to 1999 she was a deputy member of Sør-Trøndelag county council.

In August 2020, she was elected deputy leader of the Trøndelag Labour Party alongside Amund Hellesø, with Ingvild Kjerkol as leader. In February 2024, she announced that she wouldn't be seeking re-election as deputy leader.

=== Other ===
She has worked for Nei til EU and the Norwegian Confederation of Trade Unions.

Party political offices
Preceded by Anniken Huitfeldt	Leader of the Workers' Youth League; 2000–2002	Succeeded by Gry Larsen
Political offices
Preceded by Tone W. Trøen	President of the Storting; 2021	Succeeded by Masud Gharahkhani
