= Martin Henriksen (Norwegian politician) =

Norwegian politician (born 1979)

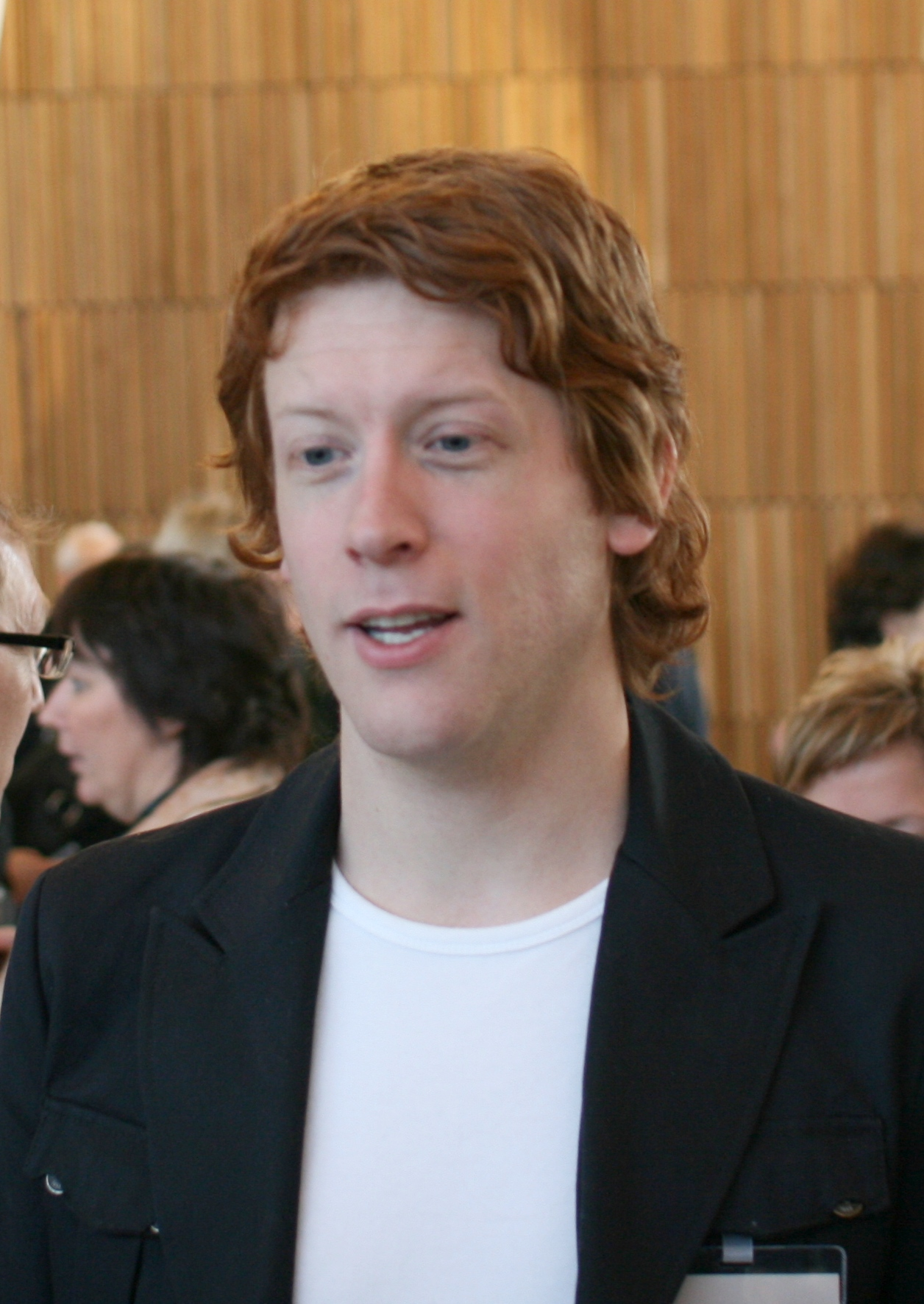
- Henriksen in 2009

Member of the Norwegian Parliament
- In office 16 October 2013 – 30 September 2021
- Constituency: Troms

Leader of the Workers' Youth League
- In office 22 October 2006 – 17 October 2010
- Deputy: Eskil Pedersen
- Preceded by: Gry Larsen
- Succeeded by: Eskil Pedersen

Deputy Leader of the Workers' Youth League
- In office 16 October 2004 – 22 October 2006
- Leader: Gry Larsen
- Preceded by: Eirik Øwre Thorshaug
- Succeeded by: Eskil Pedersen

Personal details
- Born: 5 January 1979 (age 47) Trondheim, Sør-Trøndelag, Norway
- Party: Labour
- Spouse: Tonje Brenna

Martin Henriksen (born 5 January 1979) is a Norwegian politician.

He was born in Trondheim and grew up in Harstad. From 2006 to 2010 he chaired the Workers' Youth League. He serves as a deputy representative to the Parliament of Norway from Troms during the term 2009–2013. In May 2011 he was appointed as a political adviser in the Ministry of Fisheries and Coastal Affairs, as a part of Stoltenberg's Second Cabinet.

Party political offices
Preceded by Gry Larsen	Leader of the Workers' Youth League; 2006–2010	Succeeded by Eskil Pedersen
