= Gunnar Sand =

Norwegian politician (1909–1983)

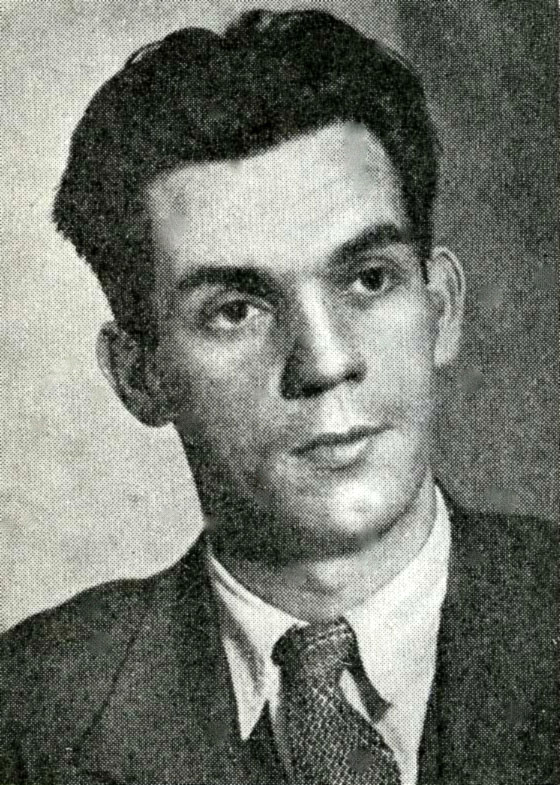
Gunnar Sand

Gunnar Sand (9 August 1909 – 28 December 1983) was a Norwegian politician for the Labour Party.

He was organized in the Norwegian Union of Postmen, and joined the Labour Party in 1925. He was leader of the local Workers' Youth League branch in Trondheim from 1928 to 1929 and 1931 to 1932, deputy leader of the regional branch in Trøndelag from 1926 to 1927 and 1929 to 1931, and leader from 1931 to 1934. He was a national board member of the Workers' Youth League from 1932 to 1934, secretary in 1934 and leader from 1934. He was also a member of the Labour Party's central board. He was re-elected at the Workers' Youth League national convention in 1937. During the occupation of Norway by Nazi Germany, starting in 1940, the organization was forbidden. Sand himself was imprisoned in Møllergata 19 from 5 September to 19 November 1940. He fled to Sweden, where he from 1943 led the executive committee of the Workers' Youth League-in-exile. After the Second World War, he was succeeded as acting chairman by Trygve Bratteli, but was a member of the central board until 1946. He was the first secretary-general in the association Folk og Forsvar, which promotes the public understanding of military affairs. He chaired the friendship association Friends of Israel in the Norwegian Labour Movement (Norwegian: Venner av Israel i Norsk Arbeiderbevegelse).

He died in December 1983 and was buried at Vestre gravlund.

Party political offices
Preceded by Kåre Hansen	Chairman of the Workers' Youth League; 1934–1945	Succeeded by Trygve Bratteli (acting)
