= Lars Leiro =

Norwegian politician

Governor of Hordaland
- In office 1 June 1966 – 31 May 1984
- Preceded by: Mons Lid
- Succeeded by: Håkon Randal

Minister of Transport and Communications
- In office 28 August 1963 – 25 September 1963
- Prime Minister: John Lyng
- Preceded by: Trygve Bratteli
- Succeeded by: Trygve Bratteli

Personal details
- Born: 13 April 1914 Haus, Norway
- Died: 22 March 2005 (aged 90) Oslo, Norway
- Party: Centre Party

Lars Leiro (13 April 1914 – 22 March 2005) was a Norwegian politician for the Centre Party.

He was born in Haus Municipality. He was elected to the Norwegian Parliament from Hordaland in 1958, and was re-elected on two occasions. From August to September 1963 he served as the Minister of Transport and Communications during the short-lived centre-right cabinet Lyng. During his stints as cabinet member his seat in the Parliament was taken by Eilif Åsbo. His career in politics ended with the post of County Governor of Hordaland, which he held from 1966 to 1984.

Leiro was a member of the municipal council of Voss Municipality from 1947 to 1960, serving as mayor in the period 1955–1959. Having grown up in Frekhaug, he had become a farmer in Voss in 1941, from which he stepped down in 1976. He held numerous posts in local and national boards and committees.

Government offices
Preceded by Trygve Bratteli	Minister of Transport and Communications; August 1963 – September 1963	Succeeded by Trygve Bratteli
Preceded by Mons Lid	County Governor of Hordaland; 1966–1984	Succeeded by Håkon Randal
