= Ragnar Bøe Elgsaas =

Norwegian politician (born 1971)

Ragnar Bøe Elgsaas (born 8 June 1971) is a former Norwegian politician for the Labour Party.

== Biography ==
He was the son of manager, Knut Elgsaas and first secretary, Johanne Margrethe Bøe.

He finished upper secondary school at Ulsrud in 1990. The next year he was hired as a Labour Party office clerk and was elected as a deputy member of Oslo city council for 1991–1995. He worked as a campaigner for the 1993 Norwegian parliamentary election and in Sosialdemokrater mot EU i Oslo for the 1994 Norwegian referendum.

He was leader of the Oslo chapter of the Workers' Youth League (AUF) from 1993 until 1995, when he withdrew after the publishing of the Workers' Youth League affair in Verdens Gang. In 1998, he was convicted of fraud. He remained a central board member of the Workers' Youth League nationwide from 1994 to 1998.

In 2000 he finished a cand.oecon. degree at the University of Oslo and made a political comeback as board member of Labour's borough branch in St. Hanshaugen, and in 2001 he commenced a four-year term as leader of Den Socialdemokratiske Forening. He was elected as a deputy representative to the Parliament of Norway from Oslo during the term 2001–2005. In the very start of his term he met as a regular representative in place of Jens Stoltenberg, who was backing down as prime minister. In total Elgsaas met during 56 days of parliamentary session.

In 2016 he fielded as a candidate to become the new leader of LO Stat, but lost the vote at their convention with 29–100.
