= Gry Larsen =

Norwegian politician (born 1975)

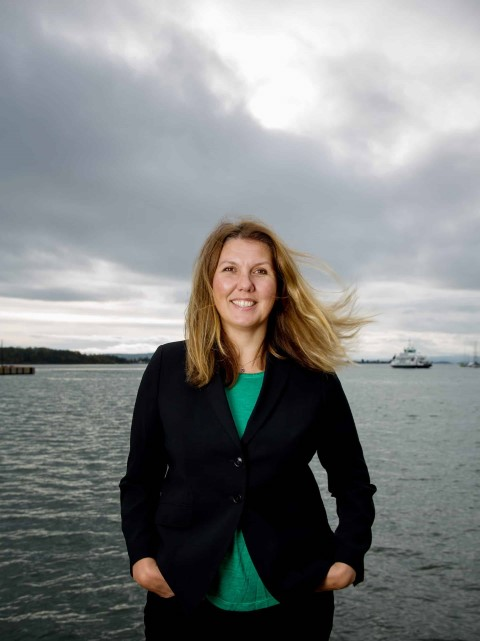

Secretary for the Ministry of Foreign Affairs
- In office 23 April 2009 – 16 October 2013
- Prime Minister: Jens Stoltenberg
- Minister: Jonas Gahr Støre; Espen Barth Eide
- Preceded by: Raymond Johansen
- Succeeded by: Bård Glad Pedersen

Leader of the Workers' Youth League
- In office 8 September 2002 – 22 October 2006
- Deputy: Eirik Øwre Thorshaug; Martin Henriksen
- Preceded by: Eva Kristin Hansen
- Succeeded by: Martin Henriksen

Personal details
- Born: 7 November 1975 (age 50)
- Party: Labour
- Spouse: Casper Claudi Rasmussen
- Children: 2

Gry Larsen (born 7 November 1975) is the general manager of Grieg Maturitas, the Grieg Group's holding company. Before that, she served as Leader of Sustainability and Public Affairs in the same company, coming from the position of National Director at CARE Norway. Larsen is a former Norwegian politician for the Labour Party.

From 2002 to 2006 she was the leader of the Workers' Youth League, the youth wing of the Labour Party.

She served as a deputy representative to the Norwegian Parliament from Oppland during the terms 1997‍–‍2001 and 2005‍–‍2009. When the second Stoltenberg cabinet assumed office, Larsen was appointed political advisor to foreign minister Jonas Gahr Støre in 2005, in the Ministry of Foreign Affairs. In April 2009, she was appointed state secretary of the Ministry and held the position until 2013.

Gry Larsen is a board member of Grieg Foundation, and WWF Norway. She is the vice chair of the board of Oppsal Fotball. She has been a member of the Norwegian Nobel Committee since 2024.

Party political offices
Preceded by Eva Kristin Hansen	Leader of the Workers' Youth League; 2002–2006	Succeeded by Martin Henriksen
