= Eirik Øwre Thorshaug =

Norwegian politician

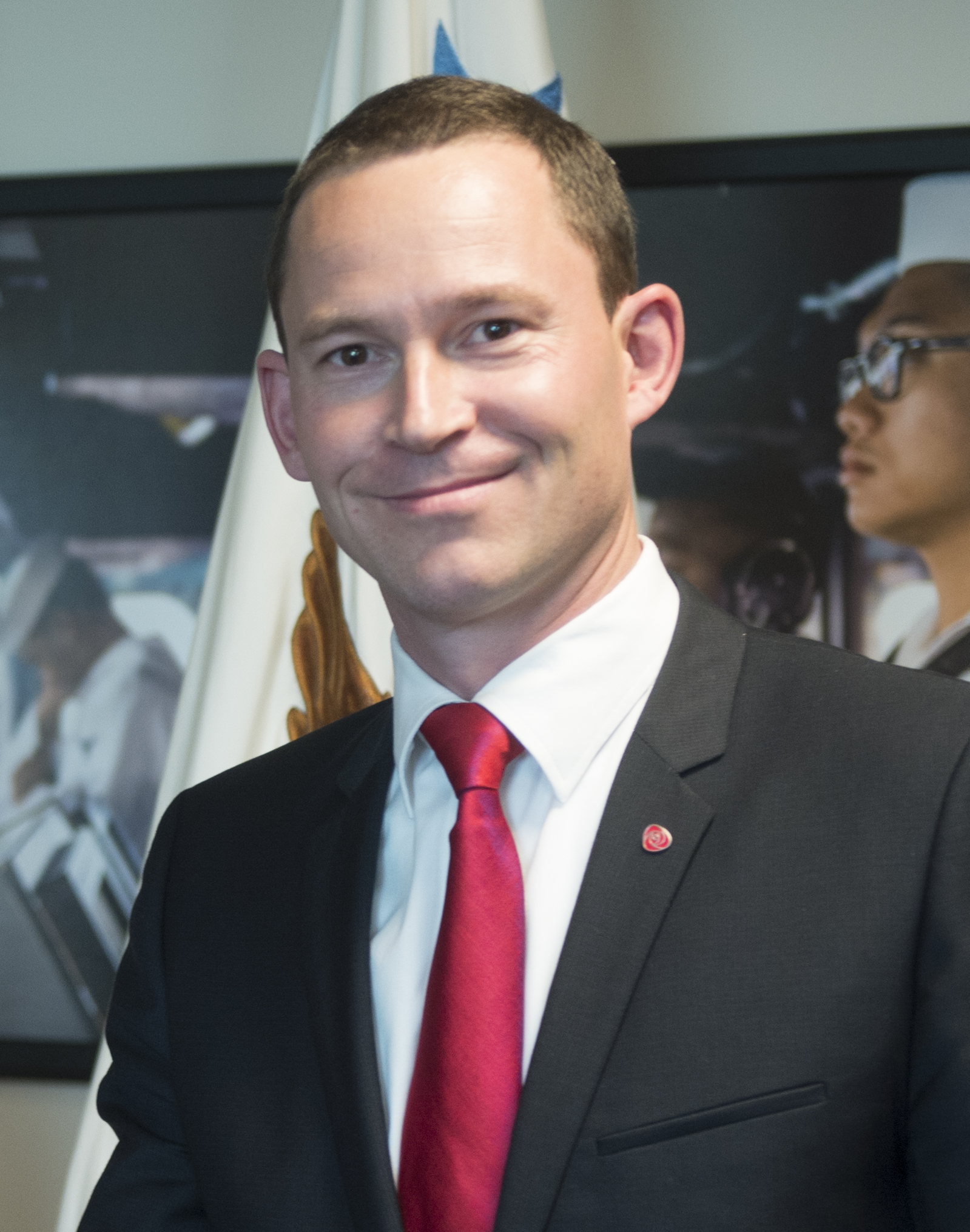
- Portrait of Eirik Øwre Thorshaug

State Secretary for the Ministry of Defence
- In office 21 September 2012 – 16 October 2013
- Prime Minister: Jens Stoltenberg
- Minister: Anne-Grete Strøm-Erichsen

Secretary for the Ministry of Justice
- In office 16 December 2011 – 7 September 2012
- Prime Minister: Jens Stoltenberg
- Minister: Grete Faremo

Political Advisor for the Minister of Justice
- In office 2 February 2007 – 1 January 2011
- Prime Minister: Jens Stoltenberg
- Minister: Knut Storberget

Deputy Leader of the Worker’s Youth League
- In office 6 September 2002 – 16 October 2004
- Leader: Gry Larsen
- Preceded by: Jo Stein Moen
- Succeeded by: Martin Henriksen

Personal details
- Born: 11 April 1976 (age 50) Hommelvik, Norway
- Party: Labour Party
- Spouse: Mina Gerhardsen

Eirik Øwre Thorshaug (born 11 April 1976) is vice president, head public and regulatory affairs for Telenor Group in Europe, and is a former Norwegian politician for the Labour Party.

He started in politics in the industrial village of Hommelvik as a member of the Workers' Youth League (AUF), where he became leader of the local chapter in 1992. He was the leader of AUF in the district of Sør-Trøndelag from 1996 to 1998 and was also a member of the national board the organization.

His first elected public position was as a municipal councilman for Malvik Municipality from 1995 to 1999. The following four years (1999–2003) he was an elected member of Sør-Trøndelag county council.

Thorshaug went through one-year compulsory military service from 1997 to 1998 in the Norwegian Army. From 1998 to 2001 he worked as the international secretary of the Workers' Youth League, and from 2001 to 2002 as a political advisor. At the AUFs Congress in 2002 Thorshaug was elected vice president of the Workers' Youth League, and served on the national board of the Labour Party.

In 2004 Thorshaug was hired as political adviser for the Labour Party fraction of the Standing Committee on Justice in the Norwegian Storting (Parliament). After the 2005 Norwegian parliamentary election Thorshaug was appointed as political adviser to Minister of Justice and the Police Mr. Knut Storberget. He remained such until 2011, with the exception of spells in 2009 and 2011 when he was acting State Secretary in the Ministry of Justice and the Police.

He was appointed State Secretary in the new Ministry of Justice and Public Security after the 2011 Norway attacks. In September 2012 he became State Secretary in the Ministry of Defence, which he remained until Stoltenberg's Second Cabinet fell in October 2013.

Thorshaug is a graduate of the University of Oslo (UiO) with a master's degree (MSc) in International relations focusing on terrorism and international security policy. He has studied political science at the Norwegian University of Science and Technology (NTNU), and International Relations with a focus on Southeast Asia at the University of Queensland (UQ), Australia.

He is married to Mina Gerhardsen.
