= Astrid Hoem =

Norwegian politician

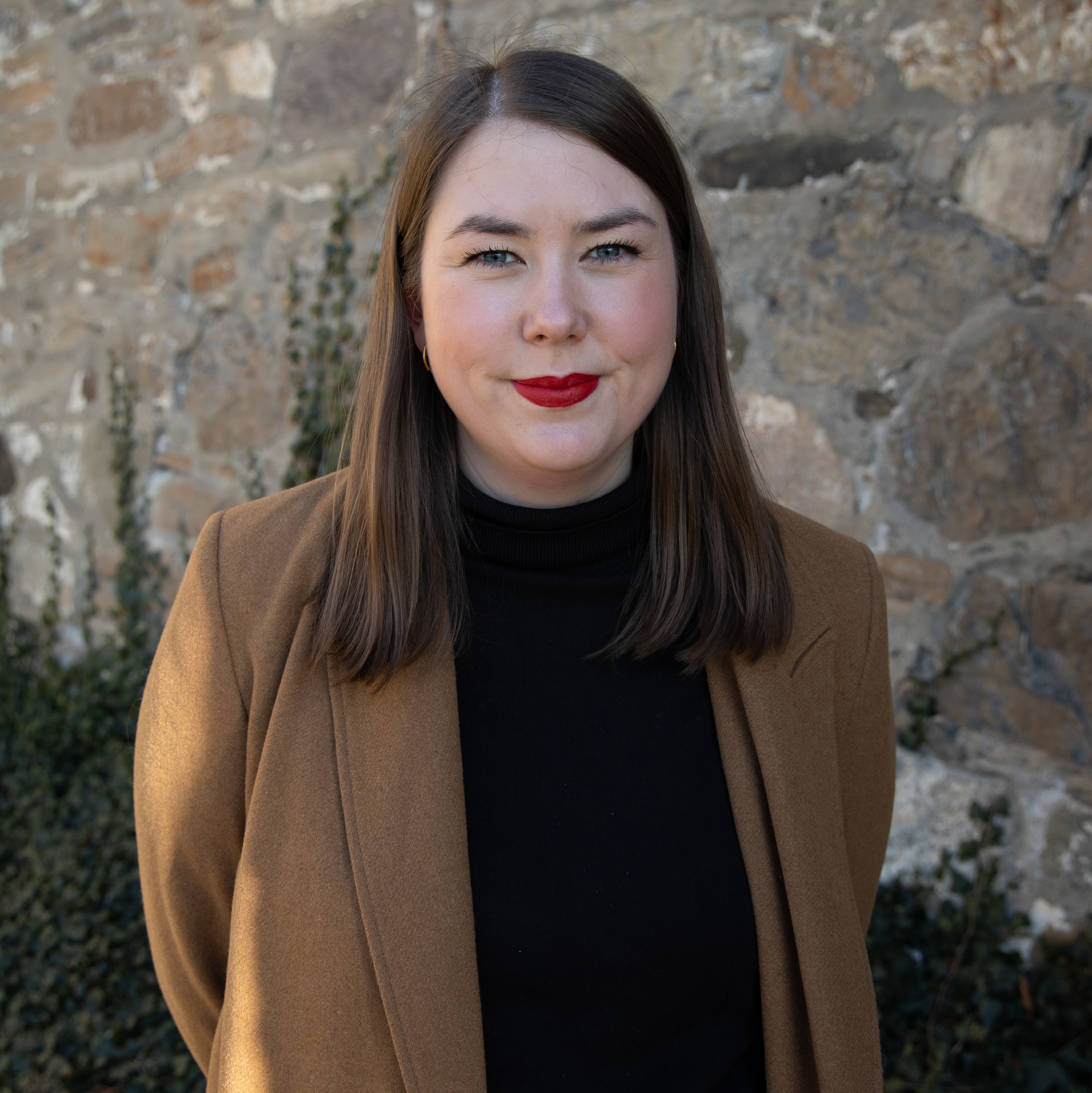

Leader of the Workers' Youth League
- In office 18 October 2020 – 20 October 2024
- Deputy: Gaute Børstad Skjervø
- Preceded by: Ina Libak
- Succeeded by: Gaute Børstad Skjervø

Deputy Leader of the Workers' Youth League
- In office 21 October 2018 – 18 October 2020
- Leader: Ina Libak
- Preceded by: Ina Libak
- Succeeded by: Gaute Børstad Skjervø

Personal details
- Born: 4 January 1995 (age 31) Kristiansund, Møre og Romsdal, Norway
- Party: Labour
- Education: University of Oslo
- Occupation: Politician

Astrid Willa Eide Hoem (born 4 January 1995) is a Norwegian politician for the Labour Party. She was leader of the Workers' Youth League from 2020 to 2024, and has been State Secretary in the Ministry of Climate and Environment since February 2025.

== Political career ==
=== Parliament ===
Representing the Labour Party, Hoem was elected deputy representative to the Storting from the constituency of Møre og Romsdal for two periods, from 2013 to 2017, and from 2017 to 2021.

=== Youth league ===
She served as the deputy leader of the Workers' Youth League between 2018 and 2020. From 2020 to 2024, she served as its leader and was re-elected in 2022. She announced in April 2024 that she wouldn't seek re-election at the party convention that October and was succeeded by her deputy, Gaute Børstad Skjervø.

=== Party politics ===
At the Labour party convention in April 2025, she was elected leader of the Labour Party's women's network, succeeding Anette Trettebergstuen.

=== State Secretary ===
She was appointed State Secretary in the Ministry of Climate and Environment in February 2025.

== Personal life ==
Born on 4 January 1995, Hoem hails from Kristiansund.

She was present at Utøya during the 2011 Norway attacks, where she hid in a cave.
