= Åsmund Grøver Aukrust =

Norwegian politician (born 1985)

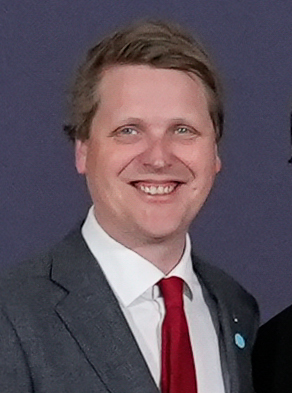
- Aukrust in 2025

Minister of International Development
- Incumbent
- Assumed office 4 February 2025
- Prime Minister: Jonas Gahr Støre
- Preceded by: Anne Beathe Tvinnereim

Member of the Storting
- Incumbent
- Assumed office 1 October 2013
- Deputy: Tobias Hangaard Linge
- Constituency: Akershus

Deputy Leader of the Workers' Youth League
- In office 17 October 2010 – 19 October 2014
- Leader: Eskil Pedersen
- Preceded by: Eskil Pedersen
- Succeeded by: Emilie Bersaas

Personal details
- Born: 28 February 1985 (age 41) Bærum, Akershus, Norway
- Party: Labour
- Education: University of Oslo

Åsmund Grøver Aukrust (born 28 February 1985) is a Norwegian politician for the Labour Party. He has been serving as the minister of international development since 2025 and a member of the Storting from Akershus since 2013. He previously served as the deputy leader of the Workers' Youth League (AUF) from 2010 to 2014 and a deputy member of the Storting from 2009 to 2013.

== Early life and education ==
Aukrust was born in Bærum. He studied at the University of Oslo receiving a bachelor's degree in sociology. He resides in Oslo.

== Political career ==
=== Local politics ===
He was elected to the Akershus county council in 2005.

=== Youth politics ===
He served as deputy leader of the Workers' Youth League from 2010 to 2014. He originally ran for the leadership, but narrowly lost the vote to Eskil Pedersen in a closely contested race, although the election committee overwhelmingly favored him.

He was present at Utøya during the 2011 Norway attacks and was notably tasked with getting an overview of survivors from the Workers' Youth League gathered at the Sundvolden Hotel.

On 25 April 2011, he was elected vice president of the International Union of Socialist Youth. He was appointed as political advisor to the Minister of Culture Anniken Huitfeldt in November 2011.

=== Parliament ===
Aukrust was elected as a deputy member of the Storting in 2009, holding the position until 2013. He has also been active in campaigning against Norwegian membership in the European Union through the organization No to the EU. At the official unveiling ceremony of the new cabinet after the 2009 elections, Aukrust caused a stir when he suddenly appeared among the ministers. Aukrust explained that he was merely trying to hand out flowers to the cabinet member who was opposed to EU membership.

Ahead of the 2013 election the Labour Party announced that Aukrust was nominated for the fourth seat in Akershus county. Analysts considered the seat to be safe for the Labour Party. He was subsequently elected to the seat. He was re-elected in 2017 and 2021.

On 23 March 2022, he and Lene Vågslid were appointed new deputy parliamentary leaders in the aftermath of Terje Aasland's appointment to the government. When he and Vågsild were appointed to government in February 2025, the party chose Ingvild Kjerkol and Tuva Moflag as their successors.

He nominated the United Nations Relief and Works Agency for the Nobel prize in 2024.

=== Minister of International Development ===
Following the Centre Party's withdrawal from government, he was appointed minister of international development on 4 February 2025.

==== 2025 ====
A few weeks after taking office, Aukrust announced that the government would be increasing their spending on humanitarian aid by supporting a further six humanitarian aid organisations with 1.9 billion NOK. He argued that humanitarian aid was becoming more important and highlighted the importance of saving lives, alleviate suffering and safeguarding human dignity and rights.

In April 2025, Aukrust joined the Advisory Board of the Global Center on Adaptation during the IMF and World Bank Spring Meetings in Washington DC.

Aukrust announced in May that the government would be selecting former Socialist Left Party politician Bård Vegar Solhjell as their candidate for the leadership of the UNDP. Aukrust described Solhjell as "a perfect candidate" and campaigned for his candidacy when meeting with several ambassadors from African countries. He also cited Solhjell's background in NORAD as an opportunity for him to make reforms at the UN.

In late May, he criticised the Progress Party for their lack of response on Israel's blockade of humanitarian aid into Gaza. He also warned that Norway could end up with "one of the most Israel-friendly governments in Europe" should the Progress Party end up in government following the 2025 election. Party member Erlend Wiborg argued that the Labour government had ruined their negotiating position by recognising Palestine.

Aukrust made a visit to Brazil and Chile in July and notably met with Brazilian finance minister Fernando Haddad. Aukrust emphasised their countries' shared interest in securing multilateralism and institutions, but also expressed an overall concern for an increase of "lack of respect" for international cooperation and multilateral institutions. Furthermore, he argued that this would weaken the global response to global crisis, such as climate, international aid and wars.

Despite revelations of corruption in the Ukrainian government, Aukrust expressed in November that it was still important to continue supporting the country with humanitarian aid and also acknowledged the country's struggle with corruption. He further added that it was important for Norway to support Ukraine through well-established organisations such as the World Bank, UN organisations and the Red Cross.

==== 2026 ====
In January 2026, Aukrust initiated work on developing a new white paper for development policy. The results is planned for be presented to Parliament in its spring session in 2027. He emphasised the importance of how development policy can help in creating more stability and preventing unrest. Furthermore, he highlighted that the project aims to "do things better and more effectively" rather than doing less.

He responded to criticism from Asle Toje in June, about the worthiness of development spending, he argued that other countries don't necessarily cut their development spending due it proving inefficient, but rather because of international uncertainty in a shifting security and defence political situation. Aukrust further argued that development will contribute to growth over time. He did however concede that development needs improvement and renewal with time, while also highlighting the difference of writing it off completely and improving it.

Having indicated in January that there would be changes in aid priorities, Aukrust announced in October that the government would be focusing on international aid in the fields of crisis and conflicts, with an additional emphasis on education for vulnerable children as well. He also pledged that the governemnt would reduce the amount of cooperative partnerships and that aid allocations would "be spread less thinly".

Party political offices
Preceded by Eskil Pedersen	Deputy Leader of the Workers' Youth League; 2010–2014	Succeeded by Emilie Bersaas
Preceded by Terje Aasland	Deputy Parliamentary leader of the Labour Party; 2022–2025; Served alongside: Lene Vågslid	Succeeded by Ingvild Kjerkol; Tuva Moflag
Political offices
Preceded by Anne Beathe Tvinnereim	Minister of International Development; 2025–present	Incumbent
