= Anders Hornslien =

Norwegian politician

deputy representative to the Norwegian Parliament
- In office 1993–1997 and 1997–2001

Personal details
- Political party: Labour Party
- Occupation: television and radio presenter

Anders Hornslien (born 6 December 1970 in Oslo) is a Norwegian media personality and politician for the Labour Party.

He was the leader of the local chapter of the Workers' Youth League from 1991 to 1993, and served as a member of Oslo city council in the same period. During this time he became a controversial figure following the Workers' Youth League affair, for which he was sentenced to five months in jail.

He served in the position of deputy representative to the Norwegian Parliament from Oslo during the terms 1993–1997 and 1997–2001. During these terms he filled in for Bjørn Tore Godal and Jens Stoltenberg while they were appointed to cabinet positions.

No longer active in political positions, he worked as a television and radio presenter in Metropol TV and Kanal 24 respectively.

Hornslien is openly gay, being the world's first member of parliament to enter a partnership union (in 1996), with former state secretary and political party fellow Vidar Ovesen. Hornslien has experienced harassment for his orientation.

He lives in Tuscany as of 2020.
