= Mons Lid =

Norwegian politician

County Governor of Hordaland
- In office 5 June 1949 – 31 May 1966
- Preceded by: Gjert Lindebrække
- Succeeded by: Lars Leiro

Minister of Finance
- In office 22 January 1955 – 28 December 1956
- Prime Minister: Einar Gerhardsen
- Preceded by: Trygve Bratteli
- Succeeded by: Trygve Bratteli

Member of the Norwegian Parliament
- In office 4 December 1945 – 31 December 1949
- Constituency: Bergen

Personal details
- Born: 8 April 1896 Norway
- Died: 3 March 1967 (aged 70) Norway
- Party: Labour

Mons Lid (8 April 1896 – 3 March 1967) was a Norwegian politician of the Labour Party who served as minister of finance from 1955 to 1956 under Einar Gerhardsen. He also served as County Governor of Hordaland from 1949 to 1966.

Government offices
Preceded by Gjert Lindebrækk	County Governor of Hordaland; 1949–1966	Succeeded by Lars Leiro
