= Mani Hussaini =

Norwegian politician

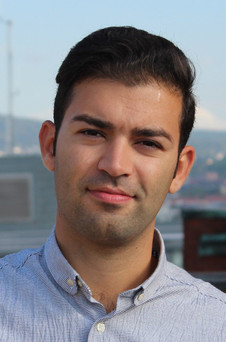

Member of the Storting
- Incumbent
- Assumed office 1 October 2021
- Constituency: Akershus

Deputy Member of the Storting
- In office 1 October 2013 – 30 September 2021
- Constituency: Akershus

Leader of the Workers' Youth League
- In office 19 October 2014 – 21 October 2018
- Deputy: Emilie Bersaas; Ina Libak
- Preceded by: Eskil Pedersen
- Succeeded by: Ina Libak

Personal details
- Born: 25 October 1987 (age 38) Qamishli, Syria
- Party: Labour
- Education: University of Oslo

Mani Hussaini (Arabic: مانی حسینی; born 25 October 1987) is a Kurdish-Norwegian politician who was the leader of the Workers' Youth League (AUF) from 2014 to 2018. He is currently a member of parliament for Akershus since 2021.

Born in a Kurdish family in Syria, Hussaini came to Norway at the age of twelve when his parents applied for asylum. His father, an agriculture engineer, was active in the Kurdistan Democratic Party of Syria. The family first sought asylum in Sweden which due to the Dublin Regulation planned to return them to Greece where they first had arrived. The family then fled to Norway in 1999, where they were granted the right to stay in 2001 and settled in Jessheim.

Hussaini became a member of AUF in 2006 and later became leader of the Akershus chapter. In the 2011 local elections, he was elected to the Ullensaker municipality council and Akershus county council for the Labour party. He was elected as deputy representative to the Parliament of Norway from Akershus for the terms 2013–2017 and 2017–2021. He was elected a regular representative from the same constituency in the 2021 election.

In September 2014, AUF's electoral committee nominated him to become the new leader of AUF after Eskil Pedersen. The nomination led to harassing comments on various internet sites based on Hussaini's ethnic background and a person who suggested the electoral committee should be executed was reported to the police. On 19 October, Hussaini was unanimously elected new leader at the league's congress in Oslo. He has named environment and economic equality as two prime political issues. He was re-elected in 2016. Hussaini did not seek re-election in 2018 and was succeeded by his deputy, Ina Libak.

He studied innovation and technology at the University of Oslo.

Party political offices
Preceded by Eskil Pedersen	Leader of the Workers' Youth League; 2014–2018	Succeeded by Ina Libak
