= Bjerke Upper Secondary School =

Coordinates: 59°56′30.24″N 10°50′16.27″E

- Bjerke videregående skole
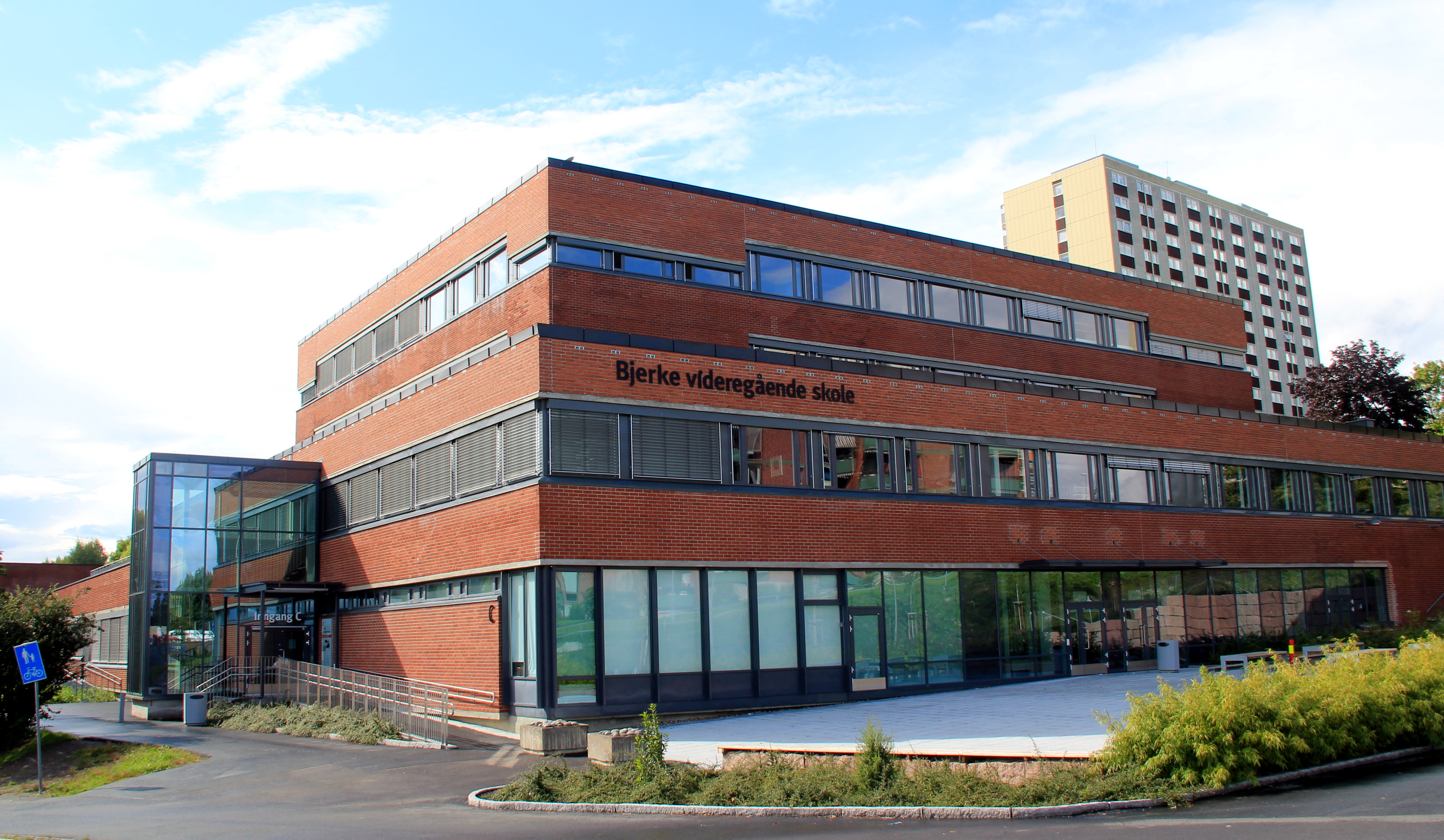
- Statsråd Mathisens vei 25, Linderud, Oslo

Information
- School type: Public school
- Established: 1962
- Principal: Margrethe Hammer
- Age range: 11th through 13th (16 to 19 years)
- Enrollment: 770 students (2017)
- Vision: A creative school (en skapende skole)
- Values: Involvement; Innovation; Cooperation
- Educational programs: Sports; General academics
- Website: https://bjerke.vgs.no/

Bjerke Upper Secondary School (Norwegian: Bjerke videregående skole) is a high school based in Groruddalen in Oslo, Norway. It offers general academics and elite sports. In 2000 the school changed its name from Linderud Upper Secondary School to Bjerke.

The school was notable for having introduced, in 2011, a system of segregating ethnic and white students to discourage Norwegian students from transferring to other schools.

== Notable alumni ==
- Mohammed Abdellaoue, footballer
- Daniel Braaten, footballer
- Christer George, footballer
- Gunnar Halle, footballer
- Kim Kristian Holmen, footballer and former gymnast
- Bjørnar Holmvik, footballer
- Øystein Pettersen, cross-country skier
- Sune Wentzel, frisbee world champion
- Turid Birkeland, TV journalist
