= Gaute Børstad Skjervø =

Norwegian politician (born 1995)

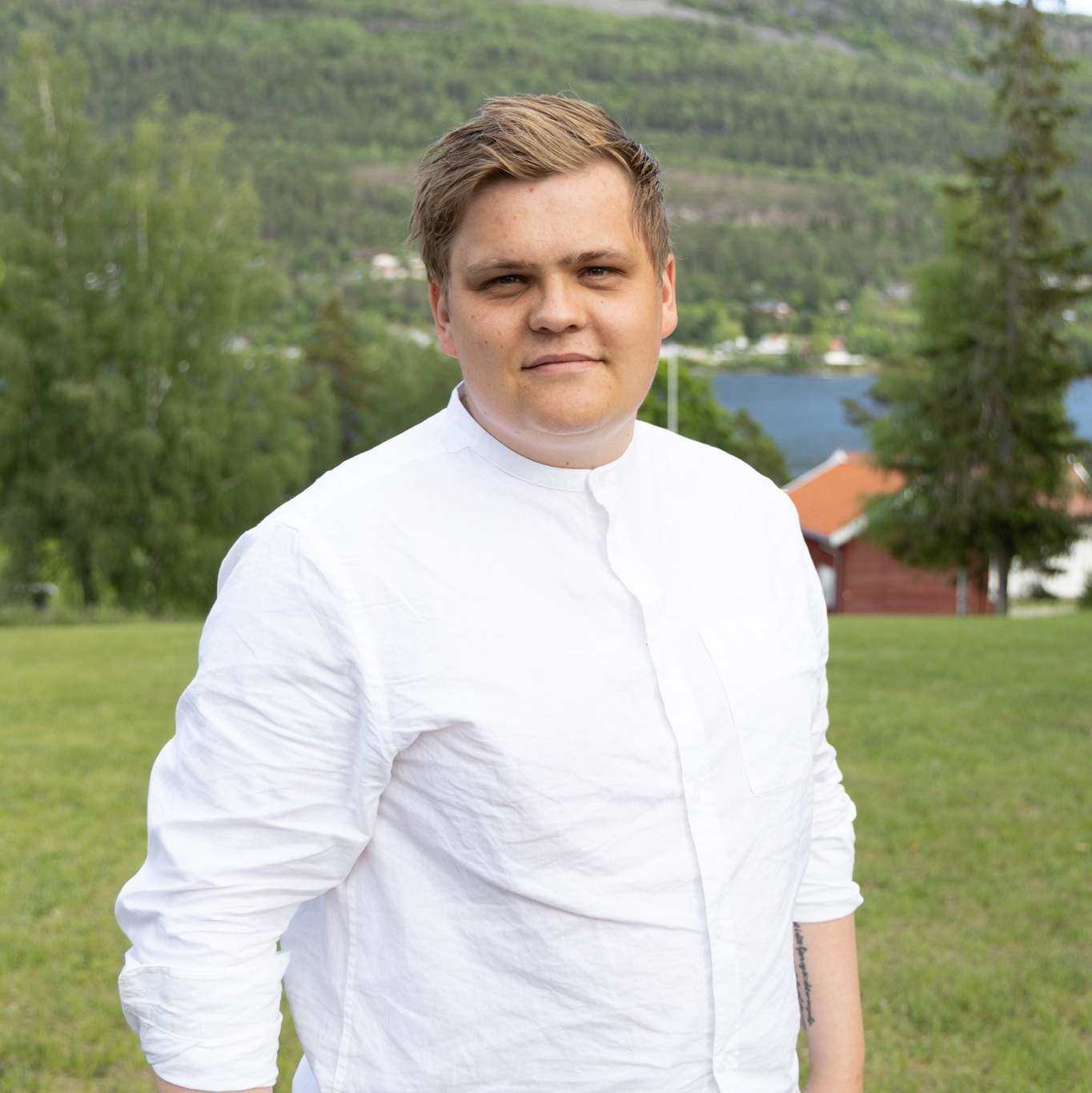
- Skjervø at Utøya in 2021

Leader of the Workers' Youth League
- In office 20 October 2024 – 18 October 2026
- Deputy: Nimrah Ramzan
- Preceded by: Astrid Hoem
- Succeeded by: Fawzi Warsame

Deputy Leader of the Workers' Youth League
- In office 18 October 2020 – 20 October 2024
- Leader: Astrid Hoem
- Preceded by: Astrid Hoem
- Succeeded by: Nimrah Ramzan

Personal details
- Born: 2 July 1995 (age 31) Levanger Municipality, Nord-Trøndelag, Norway
- Party: Labour
- Spouse: Hoda Imad (m. 2023)
- Children: 1

Gaute Børstad Skjervø (born 2 July 1995) is a Norwegian politician who served as the leader of the Workers' Youth League from 2024 to 2026. He previously served as the deputy leader of the Workers' Youth League from 2020 to 2024 and a deputy member of the Storting for Nord-Trøndelag from 2017 to 2025.

== Political career ==
=== Youth league ===
Skjervø was present at Utøya during the 2011 Norway attacks. At the age of fifteen at the time, he was one of the youngest participants at that year's Workers' Youth League summer camp. He survived the attack and escaped by swimming from the island. Skjervø didn't attend the summer camp again until 2017.

Skjervø was elected deputy leader of the Workers' Youth League in 2020 under Astrid Hoem's leadership. The duo were re-elected in 2022. After Hoem declined to seek a third term in 2024, Skjervø was elected her successor unopposed at the October convention. In June 2026, he announced that he wouldn't seek re-election at the next convention in October. He was succeeded by Fawzi Warsame.

In June 2023, he was elected vice president of the International Union of Socialist Youth.

Following a participation in a Debatten broadcast in May 2026 regarding the racism allegations against Progress Party advisor Hårek Hansen, Skjervø received hateful messages and death threats on social media, which escalated to the extent that he had to use violence alarm.

=== Parliament ===
Skjervø was elected as a deputy member for Nord-Trøndelag at the 2017 parliamentary election and was re-elected in 2021.

== Personal life ==
Skjervø married fellow Labour Party politician Hoda Imad in June 2023. Together they have one daughter.
