= Håkon Randal =

Norwegian politician

Håkon Randal (9 July 1930 in Gulen – 22 July 2012) was a Norwegian politician for the Conservative Party.

He was elected to the Norwegian Parliament from Hordaland in 1973, and was re-elected on two occasions. From February to June 1982 he was Vice President of the Storting.

He chaired the local party chapter in Bømlo Municipality from 1967 to 1971 and the county chapter from 1977 to 1979. Between 1977 and 1984 he was a member of the central party board; from 1980 he was also deputy party leader. His career in politics ended with the post of County Governor of Hordaland, which he held from 1984 to 1998.

Outside politics he worked in teaching, both in schools in Manger Municipality and Bremnes Municipality but also the Royal Norwegian Navy. He presided the Norges forsvarsforening from 2001 to 2005.

Government offices
| Preceded by Lars Leiro | County Governor of Hordaland; 1984–1998 | Succeeded by Svein Alsaker |
