= Adrian Pracon =

Norwegian youth politician

Personal details
- Born: 8 December 1989 (age 36) Skien, Telemark, Norway
- Party: Labour Party
- Profession: Politician, writer

Adrian Pracon (born 8 December 1989) is a youth politician from Norway who was the last person to be shot by Anders Behring Breivik during the 2011 Norway attacks in Utøya, an attack which he survived.

In 2012, Pracon wrote the book Hjertet mot steinen (English: The Heart Against the Rock), where he narrates his experiences on Utøya that day.

== Biography ==
Born in Skien, Telemark, Pracon is the county secretary for the Workers' Youth League, Telemark.

In August 2012 Adrian Pracon was sentenced to 180 hours of community service and kr 10,000 in damages having been found guilty by Oslo District Court of aggravated assault against two individuals in November 2011. He had unprovokedly beat the first person, a man, whom he then kicked in the head repeatedly while the man was lying on the ground. A woman also had to have several stitches sewn in her face following the incident. Pracon was given lenience by the court due to the traumas he suffered on 22 July 2011. Pracon had been at an arraignment hearing for Anders Behring Breivik earlier on the day of his offence.
