= Ola Teigen =

Norwegian politician

Ola Teigen (11 February 1937 – 28 July 1970) was a Norwegian politician for the Labour Party.

He was born in Ankenes Municipality.

He served as a deputy representative to the Norwegian Parliament from Nordland during the term 1965–1969. On the local level he was a member of Oslo city council during the term 1963–1967.

From 1964 to 1969 he was the leader of the Workers' Youth League, the youth wing of the Labour Party. He resigned amid a controversy regarding contact with the Central Intelligence Agency, which contributed to his suicide the next year after battling mental illness.

Party political offices
Preceded by Reiulf Steen	Leader of the Workers' Youth League; 1964–1969	Succeeded by Hans Raastad
