= Geir Axelsen =

Norwegian economist, civil servant and politician

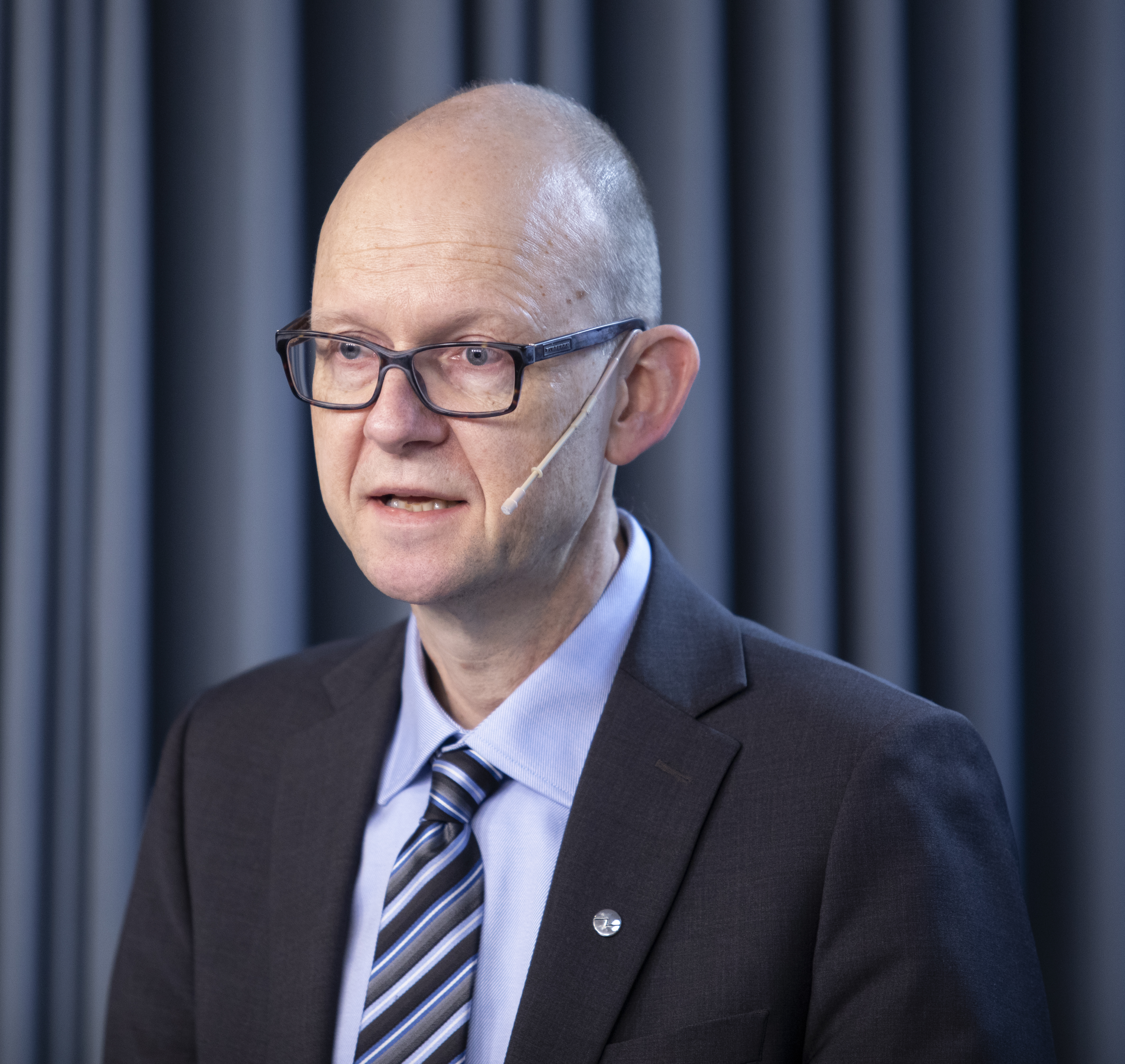
Portrait of Geir Axelsen

Geir Axelsen (born 15 May 1965) is a Norwegian economist, civil servant and politician for the Norwegian Labour Party. From 2018 he was appointed director general of Statistics Norway.

== Early life ==
Born in Oslo, he has a cand.oecon. degree from the University of Oslo in 1994 and a Master of Public Administration from John F. Kennedy School of Government in 2004.

== Career ==
He started his political career in the Workers' Youth League, and chaired that organization's chapter in Oslo from 1987 to 1988. He worked as party secretary for the Labour Party in Oslo from 1994 to 1997, when he was hired in the Ministry of Finance. In 2005 he became counsellor of the Norwegian embassy in Brussels.

When the second cabinet Stoltenberg assumed office following the 2005 election, he was appointed State Secretary in the Ministry of Finance.
