= Turid Birkeland =

Norwegian politician (1962–2015)

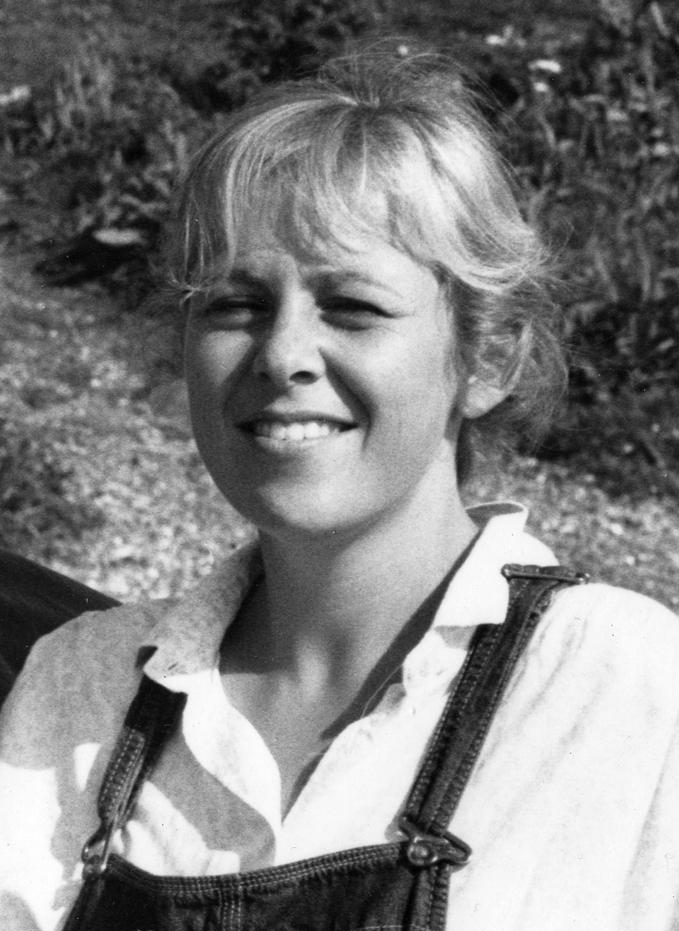
- Birkeland in 1985

Minister of Culture
- In office 25 October 1996 – 17 October 1997
- Prime Minister: Thorbjørn Jagland
- Preceded by: Åse Kleveland
- Succeeded by: Anne Enger Lahnstein

Member of the Norwegian Parliament
- In office 9 May 1986 – 30 September 1989
- Constituency: Oslo

Member of the Oslo City Council
- In office 21 October 2015 – 24 December 2015

Leader of the Workers' Youth League
- In office 25 February 1989 – 6 September 1992
- Preceded by: Jens Stoltenberg
- Succeeded by: Trond Giske

Personal details
- Born: 5 November 1962 Haugesund, Norway
- Died: 24 December 2015 (aged 53)
- Party: Labour

Turid Birkeland (5 November 1962 – 24 December 2015) was a Norwegian cultural executive and politician for the Labour Party. She was Minister of Culture in 1996–97. She was an author and also worked in television, including being chief of cultural programming at NRK and a member of the board at Telenor. She also headed the Risør Chamber Music Festival, and was the director of Concerts Norway.

== Early life and education ==
Birkeland was born in Haugesund as a daughter of trade unionist Einar Sigurd Birkeland and consultant Tora Birkeland on 5 November 1962. Her father was secretary in the Norwegian Union of Iron and Metalworkers in the 1970s, and later became international secretary in the United Federation of Trade Unions and rector of Sørmarka Folk High School.

Turid Birkeland received her secondary education at Bjerke Upper Secondary School in Oslo, graduating in 1981. She attended college from 1982 to 1983, and held an ex.phil.

== Career ==
She led her party's youth organization, the Workers' Youth League, in Oslo from 1985 to 1986 and nationwide from 1989 to 1992. Birkeland has said that she was unaware of inflated membership numbers in the Workers' Youth League that came to light after her tenure.

She was elected as a deputy representative to the Parliament of Norway in the 1985 election, but served as a regular representative through most of the term from 1986 to 1989, as a cover for Knut Frydenlund and Sissel Rønbeck who were members of Brundtland's Second Cabinet. She was a member of the Standing Committee on Education and Church Affairs. From 1993 to 1994, she worked for the Norwegian People's Aid as well as the Norwegian Confederation of Trade Unions branch in Brussels. In 1994, she was one of the spearheads in the campaign for Norway to join the European Union, which failed following a referendum on the issue.

From 1995 to 1996, she worked brief tenures as a television and radio presenter in TV+, Reiseradioen and TVNorge. From October 1996 to October 1997, she served as Minister of Culture, in the Cabinet of Thorbjørn Jagland, at which time her profession was given as journalist. In April 1997, during her term, she made the first official visit to Cuba by a Norwegian government minister, setting up a cultural exchange agreement.

After her spell as Minister of Culture, which ended following the 1997 election, Birkeland returned to Reiseradioen in 1998, and was a presenter in the channel NRK 2 from 1998 to 1999. She was then a producer and manager at Rubicon TV from 1999 to 2001, and director of cultural programming in the Norwegian Broadcasting Corporation from 2001 to 2004. She was also a member of the board at Telenor from 2007 to 2012 and the Norwegian Academy of Music from 2009. After three years as board member of the Risør Chamber Music Festival from 1997 to 2001, she was its managing director from 2004 to 2010. From June 2006 to April 2007, she also ran Café Solsiden in the same town. She also had a brief tenure in the publishing house Piratforlaget between 2005 and 2006.

On 16 April 2012, Birkeland became director of Concerts Norway, succeeding Åse Kleveland, who had also been her predecessor as Minister of Culture. In the same year she became board member of Southern and Eastern Norway Regional Health Authority. She was also a supervisory council member in Oslo Bolig- og Sparelag.

== Death ==
In 2011, Birkeland was diagnosed as suffering from myelofibrosis. She died on 24 December 2015, aged 53, from complications of the illness.

== Selected publications ==
- (ed., with Gunvor Risa). Litteratur for barn: artiklar om barns bøker og lesing. Skriftserie, Landslaget for norskundervisning, 54; Cappelen fakta. Oslo: Cappelen, 1990. ISBN 9788202126636 (in Norwegian and Danish)
- (with Sigurd Sandvin). Alle fakta på bordet. Oslo: Cappelen, 1992. ISBN 9788202138288 (in Norwegian)
- KK: Kvinner kann. Oslo: Det norske arbeiderparti Arbeidernes opplysningsforbund, 1996. OCLC 790758935 (in Norwegian)
- Stockholm. Damms reisebøker; Din guide til storbyen. Oslo: Damm, 2001 ISBN 9788251787925 (in Norwegian)
- London. Damms reisebøker; Din guide til storbyen. Oslo: Damm, 2005. ISBN 9788249607013 (in Norwegian)

Political offices
Preceded by Åse Kleveland	Norwegian Minister of Culture; 1996–1997	Succeeded by Anne Enger Lahnstein
Party political offices
Preceded by Jens Stoltenberg	Leader of Workers' Youth League; 1989–1992	Succeeded by Trond Giske
