= Framfylkingen =

Norwegian children's and families' organisation

Framfylkingen is the children's and families' organisation of the Norwegian Confederation of Trade Unions (Norwegian: Landsorganisasjonen (LO)), the activities of which include popular education and socialist education. Earlier it was closely associated also with the Norwegian Labour Party.

Framfylkingen is member of the International Falcon Movement - Socialist Education International as well as the association of labour children's movements in Nordic countries, ABN. It is involved in children's policy issues and focuses on adherence to the UN Convention on the Rights of the Child. It also acts as an environmental as well as an outdoorsman organisation which sees the importance of teaching children and adolescents about the intrinsic value of enjoying and caring about nature. Political issues which Framfylkingen works with include poverty, child labour, cultural diversity and international solidarity.

The name consists of two parts, fram, meaning "forward", and fylking which is a term which denotes an organisation and which is commonly associated with the labour movement in Norway (e.g. the Workers' Youth League, Norwegian: Arbeidernes Ungdomsfylking – AUF).

== History ==
Framfylkingen was founded in 1934 following a decision at the Labour Party congress the year before. The initiative was intended to provide an alternative to leisure activities which Christian and bourgeois organisations, such as the boy scouts, had to offer. The children were to experience cooperation instead of competition. The different chapters had an adult leader. Framfylkingen is a venue where the children can participate alone, although parents are also welcome to take part. It was the first children's organisation to introduce a member democracy where the children were included.

In the 1933 charter it states "the aim of framfylkingen is to create a public socialist outdoor organisation with parallel chores, which coincide with the interests of young people. Dexterous deeds and socialist cultural work shall go hand in hand, and in addition it will participate in international peace work."

In today's Norwegian society Framfylkingen is not associated with a political party. Its current status within the Confederation of Trade Unions came about in 1977. This means that it is an organisation for all the trade union movement as well as the labour movement in Norway.

== Sources ==
- Paul Engstad Fram i freidig, munter skare : Framfylkingen 50 år Framfylkingens venner : Tiden, 1984
