= Rogaland College =

Private college in Norway

Coordinates: 58°51′13″N 5°44′21″E

Rogaland College was a privately owned college situated about 40 kilometers (25 mi) south of Stavanger in Norway. In January 2006 the college moved to Sandnes 10 km south of Stavanger. Later the same year it merged with Diakonhjemmet University College in Oslo and became Diakonhjemmet University College Campus Rogaland, now it is part of the VID Specialized University.

Originally the College was closely connected to the central institution of Nærlandsheimen, an institution for mentally disabled people, owned by the same private owner, Det Norske Diakonforbund (The Norwegian Association of Deacons). The land involved has now been sold to Nærlandparken A/S.

To the two main bachelor programmes the College takes 90 new students every year. In addition, decentralized bachelor programme is offered in Haugesund, and the college offers some courses of continuing education. A total of nearly 400 students are being educated at any given time.

== Main programmes ==
The two main programs at the college were:

- The programme for the Authorized Social Educator (earlier known as the Welfare Nurse) which gives a degree compatible to a Bachelor of Science. The Authorized Social Educator primarily works with intellectually disabled or mentally disturbed people. It is a three-year course.
- The programme for the occupational therapist gives a degree compatible to a Bachelor of Science. Occupational Therapists help individuals; children, adolescents, adults as well as the elderly, to function in their everyday life when they are unable to perform everyday tasks due to illnesses, injuries, or other disabilities. It is also a three-year course.

Rogaland College (now Diakonhjemmet Høgskole Rogaland) was founded in 1969 by deacons who cared for intellectually disabled people.
