= Bjørn Jarle Rødberg Larsen =

Norwegian politician

Bjørn Jarle Ørnø Røberg-Larsen (born 1973, in Oslo) is a Norwegian politician for the Labour Party in the city of Elverum and in the regional parliament of Hedmark (Hedmark Fylkesting), as well as a Norwegian internet entrepreneur.

He is also the editor and publisher of Sosialdemokraten.no, a blog about social democratic politics.

Røberg-Larsen now holds the position as second deputy for the Labour Party to the regional parliament of Hedmark county (Hedmark Fylkesting). From 2007 to 2009, he served as the first deputy and from 2009 to 2011 as permanent council member. He has in particular engaged in political issues concerning transportation and infrastructure.

== Political career ==
Since May 2012, he has represented the counties of Hedmark, Oppland and Akershus as their first deputy to the Port Board of Oslo (Oslo Havnestyre).

Between 2008 and 2010, Røberg-Larsen was chairman in the Elverum branch of the Labour Party. He now holds the position as leader of Leiret Arbeiderlag, the Labour Party's largest division between Oslo and Trondheim (205 members per 31.12.2012).

Between 1992 and 1994, Røberg Larsen was treasurer and youth secretary of the Oslo chapter of the Workers' Youth League (AUF). While the organization in reality had about 700 members, the local leaders of the organization had informed the municipal authorities that they had 1,201 members, resulting in fraud of 283,000 kr in 1992. Røberg-Larsen was the only board member of the organization that admitted to the facts of the false information.

He was also the only one of the four prosecuted board members that assisted both the police and the municipal authorities by explaining what he had been involved in.

His lies led to an ice front between him and the organization, and on 12 December 1996, he was expelled from the AUF.

== Business career ==
Røberg-Larsen is the sole shareholder of BJRL Media Ltd.
