= Left Communist Youth League =

Youth wing of the Norwegian Labour Party

Left Communist Youth League (in Norwegian: Venstrekommunistisk Ungdomsfylking) was the youth organization of the Norwegian Labour Party (DNA) from 1923 to 1927. VKU published Den røde ungdom (The Red Youth). Haakon Meyer was president of VKU and Nils Hønsvald secretary.

In April 1927, VKU merged with Socialist Youth League of Norway, following the merger of DNA and the Social Democrats. The unified youth league became known as the Workers' Youth League (Arbeidernes Ungdomsfylking (AUF).
