= Socialist Youth League of Norway =

Youth wing of the Norges Socialdemokratiske Arbeiderparti

Socialist Youth League of Norway (NSU, Norwegian: Norges sosialistiske ungdomsforbund) was the youth wing of the Social Democratic Labour Party of Norway (NSA). NSU was formed on January 8, 1922 as the Social Democratic Youth League of Norway (Norges sosialdemokratiske ungdomsforbund).

The organ of the NSA and NSU was the newspaper Arbeiderungdommen, which was published 1923–1927. In May 1926, the organization took its later name. At a unity congress held in 1927, NSU merged with the Left Communist Youth League (VKU) to form the Workers' Youth League (AUF), as the youth wing of the unified Norwegian Labour Party (DNA).
