= Workers' Youth League (Norway) =

Youth wing of the Norwegian Labour Party

Workers' Youth League Arbeidernes ungdomsfylking Arbeidarane si ungdomsfylking AUF
- Chairperson: Fawzi Warsame
- Vice-Chairperson: Kristine Holden; Sandra Kalland Tenud
- Secretary General: Fabian Wahl Sandvold
- Founded: 1927; 99 years ago
- Headquarters: Oslo, Norway
- Membership: 8,997 (2022)
- Ideology: Social democracy Democratic socialism Feminism
- Mother party: Labour Party
- International affiliation: International Union of Socialist Youth
- European affiliation: Young European Socialists
- Nordic affiliation: Forbundet Nordens Socialdemokratiske Ungdom (FNSU)

Party Flag
- Website: auf.no

The Workers' Youth League (Bokmål: Arbeidernes ungdomsfylking, Nynorsk: Arbeidarane si ungdomsfylking, or AUF) is Norway's largest political youth organization and is affiliated with the Norwegian Labour Party.

== History ==
In 1903, the Norwegian Social-Democratic Youth League was formed, which the organization and historians consider to be the foundation of the organization.

As an organizational entity, AUF took its current form in April 1927 following the merger of Left Communist Youth League and Socialist Youth League of Norway corresponding with the merger of their parent parties after the conclusion of disputes over the "Twenty-one Conditions". Its ideology is social democracy and democratic socialism.

The chancellor of Germany and Nobel Peace Prize laureate Willy Brandt was a member of AUF after he fled from the Nazis in 1933 and found exile in Norway.

In 1958, the local chapter of Berge Furre and Kåre Sollund, Sosialistisk Studentlag, was closed down. A conflict arose after the United States had been offering its NATO allies American nuclear weapons as a defence against the Eastern Bloc. Sosialistisk Studenlag opposed this and as an attempt to prevent West Germany from getting access to nuclear weapons it contacted MPs during the Easter break to sign a petition. More than half of Labour's MPs signed in what is known as the Easter Rebellion of the Labour Party. The rebellion was badly received by the party leadership when the Easter break ended. Several people were excluded from the Labour Party, including the members of Sosialistisk Studentlag. All the MPs who signed the petition were later offered by the party to retract their signatures, which all but one of them did.

Three years later, Furre was one of the founders of Sosialistisk Folkeparti, which got two seats in the parliament after the 1961 election. Labour, who had been winning the majority of the seats in every election after World War II, got just 74 out of 150. No party has won the majority of the seats after this.

In 1998, the Workers' Youth League membership scandal resulted in two former treasurers and two former leaders of the Oslo chapter being found guilty of fraud, and given prison sentences for having unlawfully received NOK 648,000 in grants from the City of Oslo between 1992 and 1994—Ragnar Bøe Elgsaas, Anders Hornslien, Bjørn Jarle Rødberg Larsen and Anders Greif Mathisen.

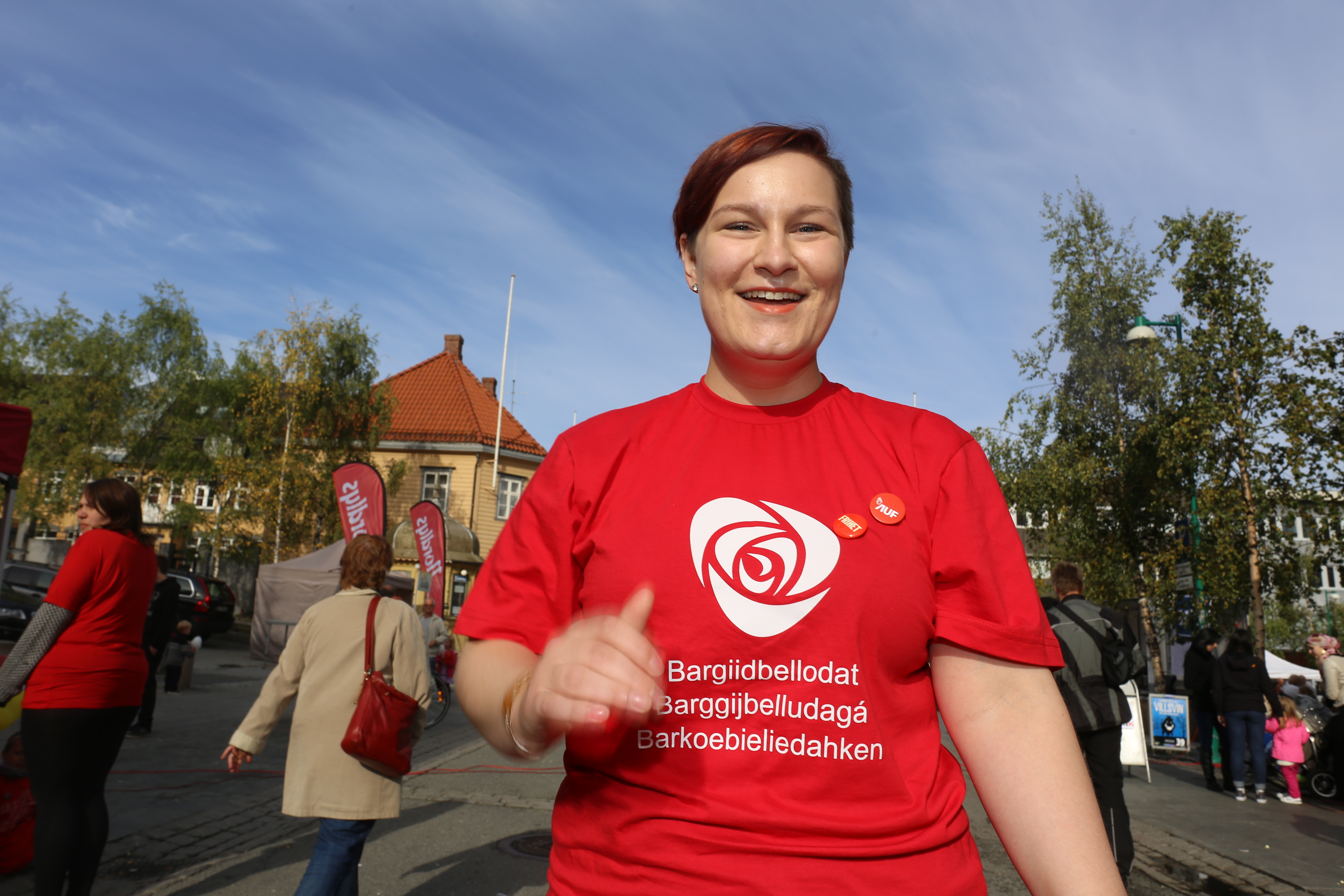
A woman wearing a Labour Party t-shirt with an AUF pin on 31 August 2013

Three prime ministers, Trygve Bratteli, Thorbjørn Jagland, and Jens Stoltenberg have been leaders in AUF. In addition, Oddvar Norli was leader of local chapter of Hedmark AUF and Gro Harlem Brundtland was deputy leader of Sosialistisk Studentlag and Arbeiderpartiets Studentlag, local chapters of AUF, before they both served as prime ministers.

AUF defines itself as inclusive feminist and supports LGBT+ rights. AUF, along with the Labour Party's LGBT+ network, were among the signatories of a 2025 call for an inclusive feminism.

== Utøya mass shooting ==
On 22 July 2011, AUF's traditional summer camp on the island of Utøya was the scene of a mass shooting carried out by far-right terrorist Anders Behring Breivik. Breivik, dressed in a homemade police uniform and showing false identification, took a ferry to the island and opened fire at the participants, killing 69 and injuring 33. Among the dead were friends of Stoltenberg and the stepbrother of Norway's queen Mette-Marit. The Utøya attack is the deadliest mass shooting by a lone individual in modern history, and the overall attacks were the deadliest in Norway since World War II.

== Organisational structure ==
Its current leader is Fawzi Abdirashid Warsame who succeeded Gaute Børstad Skjervø in October 2026. AUF employs county secretaries in all 19 counties of Norway.

Its central office is situated at the historical seat of the Norwegian labour movement, Youngstorget in Oslo, in the Peoples' Theatre building. At the main office the elected leadership work together with different political advisors with national campaigns, organisation and political issues. It is co-located with the offices of the Oslo and Akershus county wards.

The National Congress assembles every second year, and is the supreme body of the Workers' Youth League. The Congress will also elect the party leadership, consisting of a leader, a deputy leader and a secretary general. These three together with 14 other elected members constitutes the Executive Board. On a day-to-day basis AUF is governed by the Executive Board. The highest body between the Congress is the National Delegate's Board, consisting of two representatives from each of the 19 counties and is observed by the Executive Board.

The party magazine is Frihet, with roots back to 1923.

The organization is a full member of the International Union of Socialist Youth (IUSY) and the Joint Committee of the Nordic Labour Youth Movement (FNSU). AUF is also an observer member of the Young European Socialists (YES).

== Leadership ==
Leaders

- 2026–present: Fawzi Warsame
- 2024–2026: Gaute Børstad Skjervø
- 2020–2024: Astrid Eide Hoem
- 2018–2020: Ina Libak
- 2014–2018: Mani Hussaini
- 2010–2014: Eskil Pedersen
- 2006–2010: Martin Henriksen
- 2002–2006: Gry Larsen
- 2000–2002: Eva Kristin Hansen
- 1996–2000: Anniken Huitfeldt
- 1992–1996: Trond Giske
- 1989–1992: Turid Birkeland
- 1985–1989: Jens Stoltenberg
- 1981–1985: Egil Knudsen
- 1977–1981: Thorbjørn Jagland
- 1975–1977: Sissel Rønbeck
- 1973–1975: Rune Gerhardsen
- 1971–1973: Bjørn Tore Godal
- 1969–1971: Hans Raastad
- 1964–1969: Ola Teigen
- 1961–1964: Reiulf Steen
- 1958–1961: Bjartmar Gjerde
- 1955–1958: Reidar Hirsti
- 1952–1955: Ivar Mathiesen
- 1949–1952: Frank Andersen
- 1946–1949: Rolf Åkervik
- 1945–1946: Trygve Bratteli (acting)
- 1934–1945: Gunnar Sand (partly in exile)
- 1931–1934: Kåre Hansen
- 1927–1931: Hjalmar Dyrendahl

Deputy leaders

- 2026–present:
  - Kristine Holden, First Deputy Leader
  - Sandra Kalland Tenund, Second Deputy Leader
- 2024–2026: Nimrah Ramzan
- 2020–2024: Gaute Børstad Skjervø
- 2018–2020: Astrid Eide Hoem
- 2016–2018: Ina Libak
- 2014–2016: Emilie Bersaas
- 2010–2014: Åsmund Aukrust
- 2006–2010: Eskil Pedersen
- 2004-2006: Martin Henriksen
- 2002–2004: Eirik Øwre Thorshaug
- 2000–2002: Gry Larsen
- 1996–2000: Jo Stein Moen
- 1994–1996: Anniken Huitfeldt
- 1992–1994: Beret Bråten
- 1989–1992: Geir Axelsen
- 1987–1989: Turid Birkeland
- 1985–1987: Grete Berget
- 1983–1985: Jens Stoltenberg
- 1981–1983: Norvald Mo
- 1977–1981: Anne-Lise Bakken
- 1975–1977: Sigbjørn Johnsen
- 1973–1975: Sissel Rønbeck
- 1969–1973: Rolv Lasse Lund
- 1967–1969: Britt Hildeng
- 1964–1967: Kurt Mosbakk
- 1961–1964: Sverre Gullikstad
- 1958–1961: Bjørn Skau
- 1955–1958: Bjørn Sørensen
- 1952–1955: Reidar Hirsti
- 1949–1952: Bjarne Andersen
- 1946–1949: Erling Nordberg
- 1937–1946: Rakel Seweriin (not in exile)
- 1934–1937: Finn Moe
- 1931–1934: Per Lie
- 1927–1931: Arne Strøm

== See also ==
- Framfylkingen
