= Standing Committee on Foreign Affairs and Defence =

Norwegian parliamentary committee for foreign affairs and defense

The Standing Committee on Foreign Affairs and Defence (Norwegian: Utenriks- og forsvarskomiteen) is a standing committee of the Parliament of Norway. It is responsible for policies relating foreign affairs, military, development cooperation, Svalbard or in other polar regions and matters in general relating to agreements between Norway and other states or organizations. It corresponds to the Ministry of Foreign Affairs and the Ministry of Defence. The committee has 16 members and is chaired by Ine Eriksen Søreide of the Conservative Party. The members also sit on the Enlarged Committee on Foreign Affairs and the European Committee.

== Members 2021–25 ==
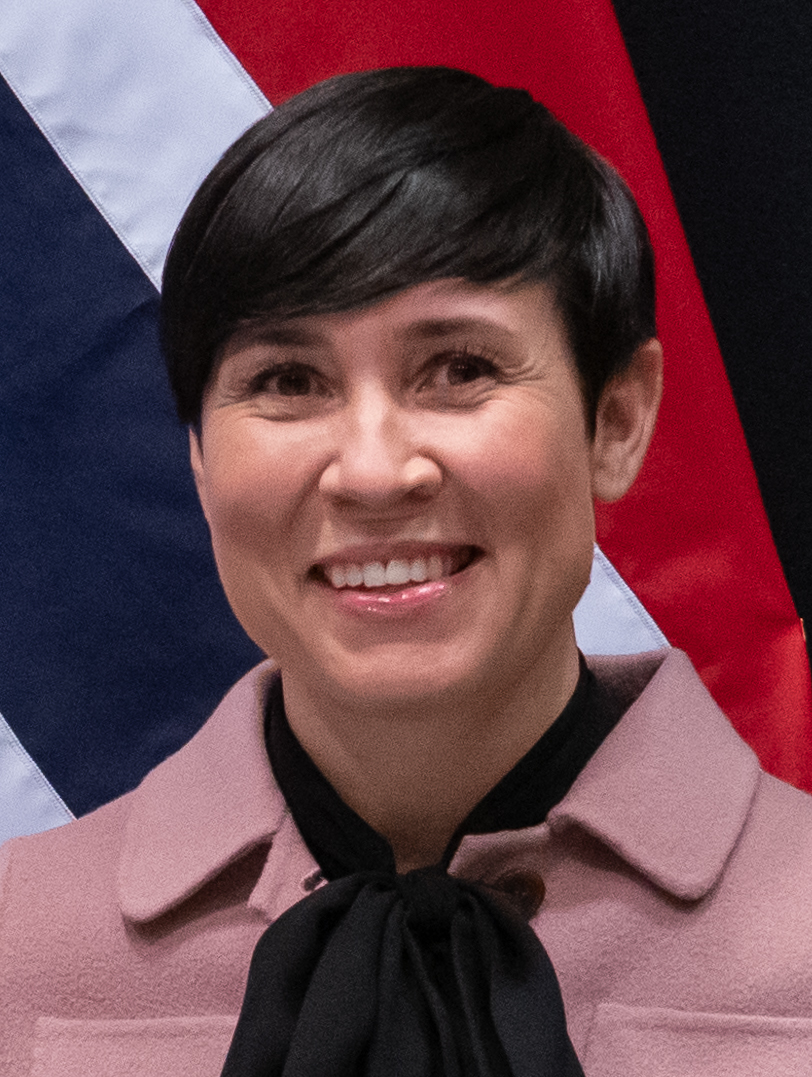
The committee is chaired by Ine Eriksen Søreide.

Representative	Party	Position
Ine Eriksen Søreide	Conservative	Chair
Åsmund Grøver Aukrust	Labour	First Vice Chair
Guri Melby	Liberal	Second Vice Chair
Christian Tybring-Gjedde	Progress	
Sylvi Listhaug	Progress	
Nils-Ole Foshaug	Labour	
Hårek Elvenes	Conservative	
Dag Inge Ulstein	Christian Democratic	
Erna Solberg	Conservative	
Eva Kristin Hansen	Labour	
Bjørnar Moxnes	Red	
Ingrid Fiskaa	Socialist Left	
Rigmor Aasrud	Labour	
Marit Arnstad	Centre	
Ingjerd Schou	Conservative	
Bengt Fasteraune	Centre	

== Leadership ==
The committee is headed by a chair and two vice chairs.

Key
Centre Party
Christian Democratic Party
Conservative Party
Labour Party
Liberal Party
Progress Party
Socialist Left Party

=== Chairs ===
Portrait	Name	Party	Took office	Left office	Tenure
	Ine Eriksen Søreide	Conservative	20 October 2009	30 September 2013	3 years, 345 days
	Anniken Huitfeldt	Labour	22 October 2013	30 September 2021	7 years, 343 days
	Ine Eriksen Søreide	Conservative	20 October 2021	24 March 2026	4 years, 155 days
	Peter Christian Frølich	Conservative	24 March 2026	present	243 days

=== Vice Chairs ===
==== First Vice Chairs ====
Portrait	Name	Party	Took office	Left office	Tenure
	Svein Roald Hansen	Labour	20 October 2009	30 September 2013	3 years, 345 days
	Øyvind Halleraker	Conservative	22 October 2013	30 September 2017	3 years, 343 days
	Michael Tetzschner	Conservative	18 October 2017	30 September 2021	3 years, 347 days
	Kari Henriksen	Labour	20 October 2021	26 November 2021	37 days
	Åsmund Grøver Aukrust	Labour	30 November 2021	4 February 2025	3 years, 66 days
	Nils-Ole Foshaug	Labour	11 February 2025	present	1 year, 284 days

==== Second Vice Chairs ====
Portrait	Name	Party	Took office	Left office	Tenure
	Bård Vegar Solhjell	Socialist Left	22 October 2009	23 March 2012	2 years, 153 days
	Snorre Valen	Socialist Left	18 April 2012	30 September 2013	1 year, 165 days
	Kristian Norheim	Progress	22 October 2013	5 June 2015	1 year, 226 days
	Christian Tybring-Gjedde	Progress	10 June 2015	30 September 2021	6 years, 112 days
	Guri Melby	Liberal	20 October 2021	30 September 2025	3 years, 345 days
	Himanshu Gulati	Progress	13 October 2025	present	1 year, 40 days
