= Anniken Huitfeldt =

Norwegian historian and politician (born 1969)

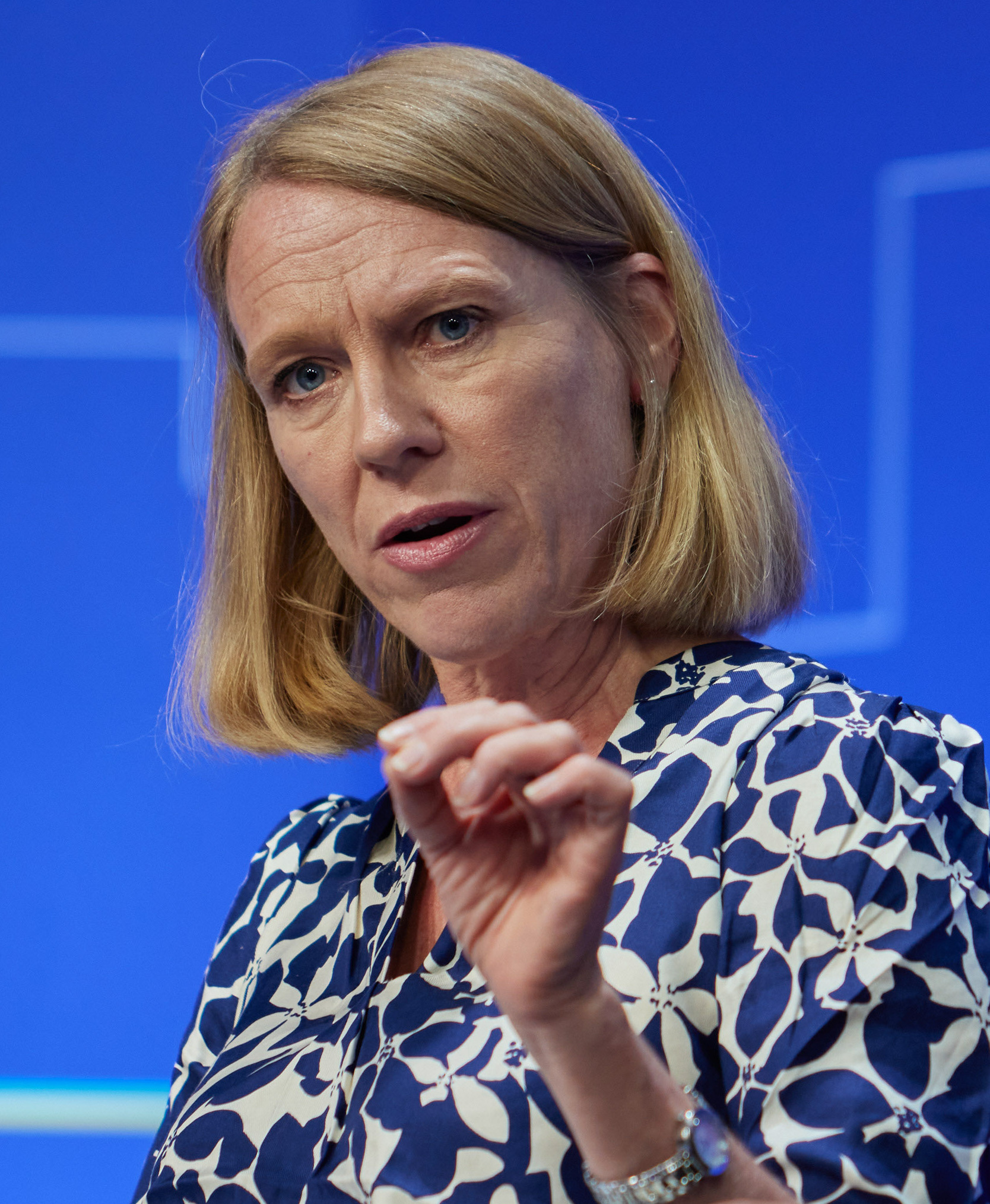
- Huitfeldt in 2023

Norwegian Ambassador to the United States
- Incumbent
- Assumed office 26 August 2024
- Prime Minister: Jonas Gahr Støre
- Deputy: Bård Ivar Svendsen; Trygve Bendiksby
- Preceded by: Anniken Krutnes

Minister of Foreign Affairs
- In office 14 October 2021 – 16 October 2023
- Prime Minister: Jonas Gahr Støre
- Preceded by: Ine Eriksen Søreide
- Succeeded by: Espen Barth Eide

Minister of Labour and Social Inclusion
- In office 21 September 2012 – 16 October 2013
- Prime Minister: Jens Stoltenberg
- Preceded by: Hanne Bjurstrøm
- Succeeded by: Robert Eriksson

Minister of Culture
- In office 20 October 2009 – 21 September 2012
- Prime Minister: Jens Stoltenberg
- Preceded by: Trond Giske
- Succeeded by: Hadia Tajik

Minister of Children and Equality
- In office 29 February 2008 – 20 October 2009
- Prime Minister: Jens Stoltenberg
- Preceded by: Manuela Ramin-Osmundsen
- Succeeded by: Audun Lysbakken

Member of the Storting
- In office 1 October 2005 – 30 September 2025
- Deputy: Gorm Kjernli; Are Helseth; Ragnhild Male Hartviksen
- Constituency: Akershus

Deputy Member of the Storting
- In office 1 October 1993 – 30 September 2005
- Constituency: Akershus

Leader of the Workers' Youth League
- In office 27 October 1996 – 22 October 2000
- Preceded by: Trond Giske
- Succeeded by: Eva Kristin Hansen

Personal details
- Born: Anniken Scharning Huitfeldt; 29 November 1969 (age 56) Bærum, Akershus, Norway
- Party: Labour
- Spouse: Ola Petter Flem
- Children: 3
- Education: University of Oslo; London School of Economics

Anniken Scharning Huitfeldt (born 29 November 1969) is a Norwegian politician and historian. She has served as the Norwegian Ambassador to the United States since 2024. A member of Labour Party, she has previously held several ministerial roles under Jens Stoltenberg between 2008 and 2013 and then served as foreign minister under Jonas Gahr Støre between 2021 and 2023.

== Early and personal life ==
She was born on 29 November 1969 in Bærum Municipality, Norway, to the daughter of public prosecutor Iver Huitfeldt (born 1943) and Sidsel Scharning (1940–1990). She is one of two siblings: Her sister, Astrid, was also a politician, and her brother, Anders, a civil servant. She is the niece of politician Fritz Huitfeldt and the granddaughter of judge Otte Huitfeldt. Huitfeldt grew up in the town of Jessheim. She is also a descendant of Norwegian Chancellor Jens Bjelke (1580–1659). She is a member of the Danish noble family Huitfeldt, which now mainly resides in Norway.

She attended Jessheim Upper Secondary School from 1985 to 1988, and then worked for one year as a county secretary of Workers' Youth League, a youth wing of Labour Party.

Huitfeldt was involved in student politics already while attending school, as a member of Akershus county school board from 1986 to 1988. She was also a central board member of Norges Gymnasiastsamband from 1987 to 1988, and in her native Ullensaker, she was a member of the municipal equality committee.

From 1989 to 1992, she studied at the University of Oslo, minoring in political science and history, and from 1992 to 1993, she took a minor in geography at London School of Economics. From 1993 to 1996, she took a master's degree in history in Oslo.

She married Norwegian businessman Ola Petter Flem (born 9 November 1969), on 7 September 2002 at Røros, with whom she has three children.

== Early career ==
She chaired the Ullensaker branch of the Workers' Youth League from 1985 to 1988 and became a central board member in 1990. She advanced to deputy leader in 1994 and was the Workers' Youth League leader from 1996 to 2000. From 2000 to 2001, she was the vice president of the International Union of Socialist Youth.

She was elected as a deputy representative to the Parliament of Norway from Akershus for the terms 1993-1997 and 2001–2005, and entered Labour Party's central board in 2002, but mainly worked as a researcher in the Fafo Foundation from 2000 to 2005. Among other things she wrote reports on child slavery, trafficking, child marriage and women's rights. Huitfeldt was also a board member of the Falstad Centre from 2000 to 2005 and Save the Children Norway from 2001 to 2005.

== Political career ==
Huitfeldt was elected as a full representative to Parliament for the first time in 2005, and has been re-elected since. From 2005 to 2008, she served as the deputy leader of the Standing Committee on Education, Research and Church Affairs, and from 2013 to 2021, she led the Standing Committee on Foreign Affairs and Defence as well as the Enlarged Committee on Foreign Affairs and Defence.

She also led the Labour Party's women's network for twelve years, between 2007 and 2019. She stepped down from the position in March 2019, after having been elected the leader of the Akershus Labour Party, succeeding Sverre Myrli.

=== Ministerial appointments ===
Huitfeldt served as Minister of Children and Equality from 2008 to 2009, Minister of Culture from 2009 to 2012 and Minister of Labour and Social Inclusion from 2012 to 2013 under Jens Stoltenberg. Her seat in Parliament was covered by deputies Gorm Kjernli (2008–2009) and Are Helseth (2009–2013).

Following the 2021 election, Huitfeldt was seen as a strong favourite to become minister of foreign affairs, in addition to Espen Barth Eide and Raymond Johansen. However, some anonymous sources noted her as a possible candidate as minister of education, which was interpreted as a way to sabotage her foreign minister candidacy by Labour Party sources. The reason behind this was seen by them as retaliation for her inaction to make a clear standing against Trond Giske at the time of MeToo within the party. Despite this, she was subsequently appointed minister of foreign affairs on 14 October 2021.

=== Minister of Children and Equality ===
On 29 February 2008, she became Minister of Children and Equality in Stoltenberg's Second Cabinet. She was appointed following the resignation of Manuela Ramin-Osmundsen following a scandal involving cronyism.

In July, Huitfeldt demanded permission to visit a Palestinian friend in an Israeli prison. The person in question, was Hussam Shaheen, who in 2004 was designated as the secretary of Fatah's international youth. Since December 2006, both Huitfeldt and several other Labour MPs had demanded permission to visit Shaheen. Huitfeldt further said: "If Israel is a country of rule of law, they should give me such permission. At least give me an answer with a reason". The Israeli embassy in Oslo responded with saying that the guidelines only permitted relatives and families of prisoners.

In March 2009, Huitfeldt met with Menije Ravandost, who had wrongly lost her residence permit after having been smuggled to Iran against her will. She described Ravandost's story as giving "a useful impression", and further added: "her story is important so that we in the ministry can make good laws and rules".

=== Minister of Culture ===
Following the 2009 election, Huitfeldt was appointed minister of culture on 20 October.

Huitfeldt caused controversy in January 2010 when it was announced that she was travelling to see the 2010 Winter Olympics in Vancouver, Canada, with her husband, Ola Flem. This was because the bill for the trip—around 37,000 NOK—was paid by the state with taxpayers' money. Huitfeldt defended the action, arguing that the Ministry of Foreign Affairs recommended it, and that the trip was a representation mission, and that her husband in this case, served as her companion.

In March 2010, Huitfeldt announced that it was unnecessary for the state to take over the ownership of the digital variant of Store norske leksikon despite a prior proposal that ensured it would be taken down by 1 July 2010. She further stated that people should be allowed to utilise sources they seem fit.

Following controversy over the appointment of a new director for the Language Council of Norway in October 2010, Huitfeldt issued an apology after four out of the seven board members resigned.

Huitfeldt opened Rock City on 11 November 2011, a new national resource center for pop and rock, in Namsos Municipality, Trøndelag.

In August 2012, Huitfeldt announced that 400 000 NOK would be spent to map out the status of Norwegian music export. She stated that "We must treat the music industry as an industry, and then it is important to have this report made".

Huitfeldt and her husband attended Turtagrø Fjellfilmfestival in addition to celebrating their tenth wedding anniversary in early September 2012.

After the new study into the Munch museum in mid September, the family demanded that Huitfeldt have a say in the critical process after MP Ib Thomsen called on her to assist the municipality with finding a solution.

=== Minister of Labour and Social Inclusion ===
On 21 September 2012, Stoltenberg commenced a reshuffle where Huitfeldt was appointed minister of labour and social inclusion.

In early December, Huitfeldt expressed concerns over safety measures on Norwegian oil rigs while visiting the Statfjord C rig. She notably said: "There have been three serious incidents on the Norwegian shelf this autumn and there is great risk potential in this work. We have a high degree of security but this is still a high risk". She also promised that 20 million NOK would be spent on improving control inspections on Norwegian rigs.

On 12 December, Huitfeldt put forward a proposal to give recently educated working women a full time job. This also included would also give part-time employees a job percentage that is in line with how much they actually work.

In late January 2013, Huitfeldt encouraged people to notify if they hear or overhear someone boasting about having tricked the Norwegian Labour and Welfare Administration, following the release of the 2012 report of social security fraud. The report revealed that there had been an unusual high amount of fraud having occurred that year.

In August, NTB revealed that 68 200 people could lose their NAV support. The reason given was that could not receive work clearance money (Norwegian: arbeidsavklaring-penger, AAP) for more than four years. Huitfeldt commented: "I would strongly warn against believing that all of these will be transferred to disability pensions. Some will return to work. And some will go into disability pension". Conservative Party leader Erna Solberg criticised by saying that "the government has said very little on what is going to happen".

Following the Red-Green coalition's defeat in the 2013 election, Huitfeldt was succeeded by the Progress Party's Robert Eriksson.

=== Minister of Foreign Affairs ===
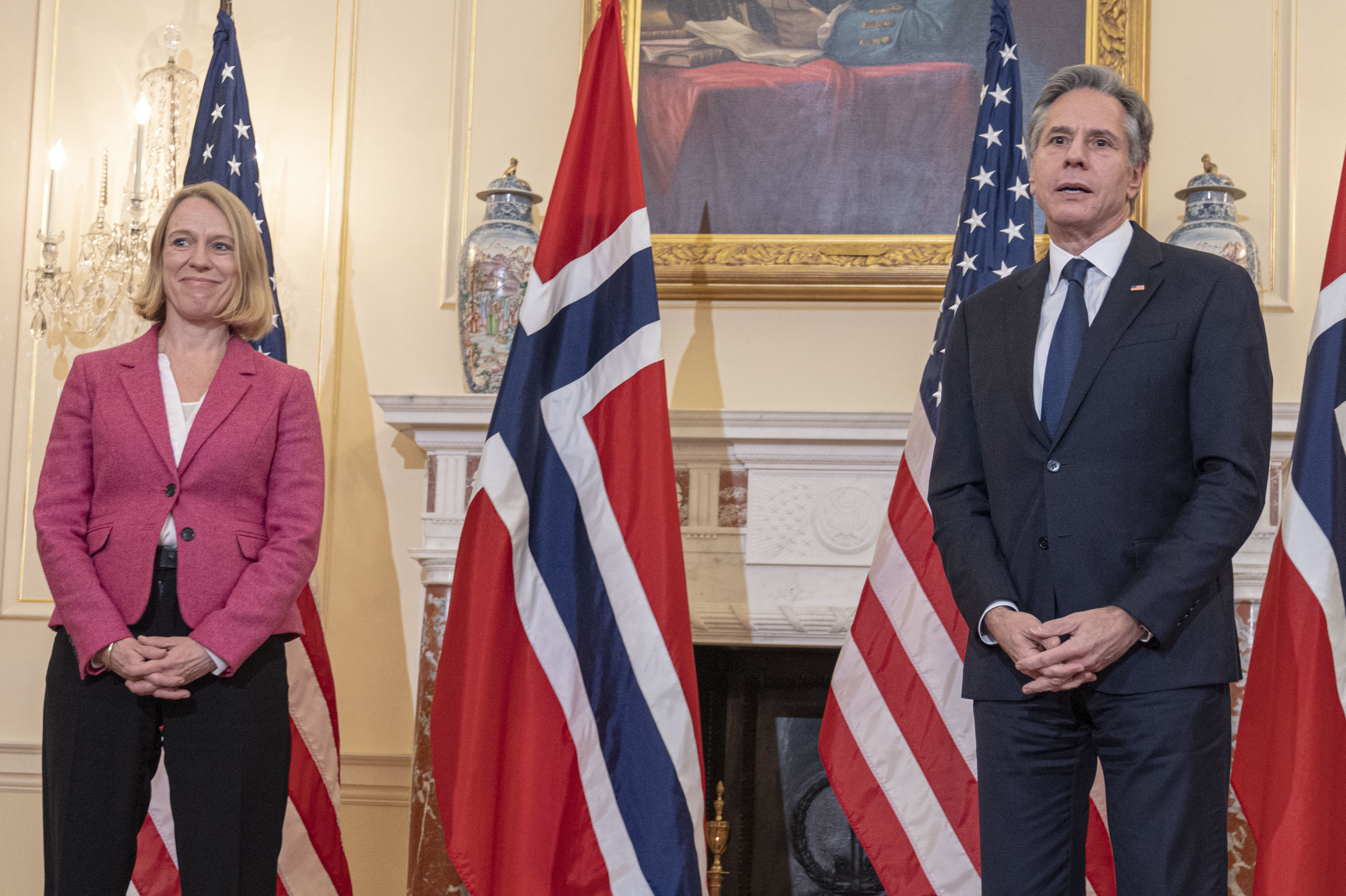
Huitfeldt with US Secretary of State Antony Blinken in 2021

She was appointed minister of foreign affairs on 14 October 2021 in Jonas Gahr Støre's cabinet.

==== 2021 ====
A week into the new government's tenure, Huitfeldt stated it was irrelevant for Norway to bring back several women associated or have fought for ISIS. She specified it regarded those who traveled out as "foreign warriors", but emphasised that every individual had the right to consular aid. She further added that the government was worried about those with children. Aid organisation Redd Barna stated that the government should be obligated to bring the children home, criticism which was notably reiterated by the Green Party, Liberal Party, Red Party and the Socialist Left. The latter stated that "Norway has a judicial and moral responsibility to bring home Norwegian citizens and their children".

A day ahead of the Barents Euro-Arctic Council meeting, Huitfeldt met with Russian foreign minister Sergei Lavrov in Tromsø, where they also put flowers on the grave of fallen Soviet soldiers. Huitfeldt also received an invitation from Lavrov to visit Moscow.

Huitfeldt advised that the European Economic Area (EEA) committee would be discussing the European Union's railway policy on 29 October, and added: "The meeting of the EEA Committee on 29 October is the first since the change of government. I can confirm that Norway's representative will make the EU side aware of the government platform at this meeting. We will inform our EEA / EFTA partners of this in advance." She went on to add: "we are particularly skeptical about the requirements concerning the tendering of passenger train traffic. We believe that tenders are not the right tool to offer travelers a good railway offer. There should be great national freedom to opt out of this". She further said that contracts could still be given directly before the transition expires on 25 December 2023, and last up to ten years.

She chaired the Barents Euro-Arctic Council meeting on 26 October, where she also expressed that she wanted to strengthen relations in the north.

Huitfeldt expressed concerns about the humanitarian situation in Syria, specifically citing human suffering as the seasons change. She also stated that Norway would be assisting with 107,5 NOK to the United Nations and human aid organisations.

She expressed sympathy for Poland regarding the ongoing migrant crisis at its border with Belarus. She stated that "Poland is in a very difficult situation", and also criticised Belarusian authorities for using vulnerable people as foreign policy leverage.

In December, she and fellow ministers Marte Mjøs Persen and Jan Christian Vestre, and Crown Prince Haakon visited the United States to promote Norwegian interests notably regarding "War, the Arctic, offshore wind, contemporary art and Christmas trees". Huitfeldt stated: "The main message is to strengthen the partnership between Norway and the United States through a green partnership. This is where we have a lot to offer in meeting the Americans".

On 17 December, Huitfeldt expressed support for the European Union and NATO's proposal of sanctions against Russia should they invade Ukraine. Huitfeldt said it "would have strong economic and political consequences if they utilise military means". She also encouraged that the Russians should de-escalate. Huitfeldt also expressed concerns over a possible build-up to a possible armed conflict.

Red Party leader Bjørnar Moxnes sent a written question to Huitfeldt on 21 December, asking her to do something to prevent the extradition of Julian Assange. She made it clear that she can't interfere in foreign court situations, and added: "Norway expects that the United Kingdom, the United States and all other countries to comply with their international human rights obligations". Moxnes in return criticised her, saying: "The Foreign Minister's tacit consent to Norway's closest allies killing Assange is a shameful betrayal of freedom of expression and human rights".

==== 2022 ====
On 2 January 2022, Huitfeldt expressed concerns over the upcoming EU negotiations about EEA funds on background of Hungary blocking proposals in the EEA council in November 2021. She called it unfortunate that they were willing to let the ongoing disagreements with Norway affect internal EEA cooperation. Huitfeldt also expressed concerns about democracy in both Hungary and Poland, and emphasised that Norway doesn't want conflicts, but would not back down on their demands on the rule of law and independent civil society.

Two days later, she responded to a written question submitted by Red Party leader Bjørnar Moxnes in December, regarding Israel's listing of six Palestinian organisations. The cause for concern was due to Norway supporting three of the said organisations. Huitfeldt stated that Norway and other supporting countries have asked Israel to give documentation on their allegations against the organisations.

At a joint press conference with defence minister Odd Roger Enoksen on 14 January, Huitfeldt expressed concerns about NATO's negotiations with Russia. She stated: "This week there have been several meetings in various European capitals. We want negotiations and talks on these issues to get a diplomatic solution to this difficult issue". She went on to say: "It is difficult to predict what will happen, and we keep all possibilities open. But the first signals we have received from Moscow do not give cause for optimism". On the topic of the cyberattack in Ukraine, Huitfeldt said: "I do not know the details of the cyberattack, other than what has appeared in the media. We will gather more information about this during the day. We see that the cyber domain is an arena where there is escalation, so of course it is serious".

Huitfeldt announced on 11 February that the Ministry of Foreign Affairs would be asking Norwegian citizens in Ukraine to come back home, as a reaction in anticipation of a possible invasion by Russia. On 21 February, she condemned Russia's diplomatic recognition of two self-proclaimed separatist republics in Donbas.

On 27 February, Huitfeldt announced that Norway would be closing their airspace for Russian airlines. She stated: "We have consulted with our Nordic neighbors and will close the airspace to Russian flights at the same time as they do".

In March, Huitfeldt stated that Russia doesn't have the right to invade Norway because of they assisted in sending weapons to Ukraine. She also emphasised that their participation didn't violate international law and that it shouldn't be viewed as an armed attack against Russia. She wrote: "In order for Norway to be considered a party to the war, we must actively participate in military operations in Ukraine with Norwegian military forces or in the exercise of control or control of the use of force by Norwegian forces. The weapons support we now contribute with cannot be considered as such participation".

Huitfeldt accused Russia of spreading falsehoods about Ukraine having biological weapons labs, stating: "Biological weapons are classified as weapons of mass destruction. All use of biological weapons is prohibited and something Norway strongly condemns. There is no indication that Ukraine is developing such weapons. On the other hand, most indications are that Russia, by promoting such accusations, is trying to expand its own room for manoeuvre in the war". She went on to add that it would also be Norway's message at the United Nations Security Council meeting on Friday, 18 March.

On 6 April, Huitfeldt announced that Norway would expel three Russian diplomats, stating: "The three have conducted activities that are incompatible with their diplomatic status". She also noted that the timing wasn't coincidental either: "They come at a time when the whole world is shaken by reports of Russian forces abusing civilians, especially in the city of Butsja outside Kyiv. It is natural that in such a situation we pay increased attention to unwanted Russian activities in Norway".

On 23 April, she confirmed that Norway and Russia both did not have any political contact at present as a result of their invasion of Ukraine. On the question of excluding more diplomats, Huitfeldt said that "one can never rule anything out in this war". She also didn't want to speculate if Norway would actually exclude more Russian diplomats, arguing that they had already excluded the ones they wanted to exclude.

On 6 May, Huitfeldt announced in a press release, that the EEA agreement would be reviewed after the previous time ten years ago. A commission has been set down to commence said review. In their statement, Huitfeldt said: "It is now ten years since the last EEA study. It has been ten years of rapid development in Europe, in the EU and in EEA co-operation. We will now acquire the best possible knowledge base about the EEA agreement and the room for maneuver the agreement gives us in a changing time in Europe. The goal is to get a factual and balanced report that tells what the agreement means in practice".

Following the criticism from Polish prime minister, Mateusz Morawiecki, who said that Norway should share their oil and gas income with less wealthier countries; Huitfeldt responded, saying: "If we compare with other countries, Norway has already contributed with significant amounts. We have shown that we are a country with a big heart and great solidarity with the Ukrainian people. It is clear that the country has enormous needs now to build housing, schools, but also the judicial system and democratic institutions, so we are prepared to participate in it."

On 15 June, Huitfeldt visited UN humanitarian workers on the Turkish-Syrian border, and to meet Turkish foreign minister Mevlüt Çavuşoğlu to discuss NATO expansion. She expressed hopes for a resolution to be reached at the upcoming NATO summit, and commented on Swedish and Finnish membership: "I am concentrating on finding a solution to this question. I believe that it is also in Turkey's self-interest that decisions are made in NATO. The security of the entire alliance will be better, and Sweden and Finland will provide resources to NATO, which will also benefit Turkey". Regarding accusations of harbouring PKK members similar to those made against Sweden and Finland, she said: "This is something we have had different assessments of, and something I have rejected in meetings with representatives of the Turkish authorities. In Norway, this is part of freedom of expression. And otherwise it is a question the judicial system may have to consider".

On 24 July, she condemned a Russian attack against a grain harbour in Odesa, Ukraine; calling the situation in the country "pitch black" in the wake of the Russian-Ukrainian corn export agreement. Huitfeldt stated: "Although the situation in Ukraine is pitch black, this agreement was a sign of something that could pull things in a different direction. Then comes this attack. Of course we get restless. The attack increases distrust between the parties, and it is very serious".

In early August, the Russian embassy announced that they would be contacting the Norwegian government about Huitfeldt's response at the end of June, to a question from her predecessor, Ine Eriksen Søreide, where Huitfeldt referred to Russia as "authoritarian" and that the country showed stronger "totalitarian signs". Her full response to Søreide was: "The Putin-regime has gone from being authoritarian to showing stronger totalitarian signs".

On 2 September, following the release of a UN human rights report into China's treatment of Uyghurs, Huitfeldt expressed concern for the situation in Xinjiang and called for the country to respect human rights. She stated: "We call on the Chinese authorities to respect all their human rights obligations, stop the arbitrary deprivation of liberty of Uyghurs and other minorities, and to cooperate fully with UN human rights institutions to ensure compliance with binding international human rights obligations".

In the wake of the death of Mahsa Amini, Huitfeldt called on Iranian authorities to respect freedom of speech, freedom of gathering and the freedom of the press. She also emphasised the importance of Amini's death being thoroughly investigated, and called it alarming that people had died during the protests following Amini's death.

From 26 to 27 September, Huitfeldt visited Japan to attended the funeral of former Japanese Prime Minister Shinzo Abe, who was assassinated while giving a speech during the Japanese House of Councillors election in Nara. During her visit, Huitfeldt also met the house of representatives of Japanese authorities, including then-Japanese foreign minister Yoshimasa Hayashi and Norwegian businesses in Japan.

On 6 October, Huitfeldt and justice minister Emilie Enger Mehl announced that Norway would be sharpening its security and control regarding Russian fishing vessels after receiving information that called for said need. Prime Minister Støre later confirmed this, noting that there were disorder at several Norwegian ports. Huitfeldt also asserted that Norway would not be a free-harbour for Russian vessels.

On 20 October, Amnesty International Norway criticised Huitfeldt for seemingly not expressing clear opposition to human rights violations in Qatar. Huitfeldt had previously made the same criticism against her predecessor, Ine Eriksen Søreide, about the same issue. In response to Amnesty, Huitfeldt reasoned that Norway doesn't have any diplomatic relations with Qatar, and no trade interests in the country.

On 26 November, Huitfeldt and her ministry announced that Norway would be supporting Ukraine's case against Russia in the International Court of Justice. Huitfeldt stated: "We have a legal interest in contributing to the clarification of the questions raised by the case. It is also important to signal to Russia and the outside world that the international community does not accept the aggression against Ukraine".

In early December, she visited London and met her British counterpart, James Cleverly, to discuss continued military cooperation and attended the annual Christmas tree lighting.

==== 2023 ====
In January 2023, she criticised Israel's decision to withhold funding to Palestine in response to the International Court of Justice deciding to investigate the occupation of Palestinian areas. Huitfeldt stated: "Norway is strongly critical of the Israeli government's announcement of punitive measures against the Palestinian Authority. I would strongly urge the Israeli authorities to respect the agreements made and transfer the funds that belong to the Palestinians".

In February, Huitfeldt reiterated NATO's concerns about China possibly supplying Russia with weapons. She added that Norway has put forward their views to the Chinese, and also called Russia a "dangerous neighbour" and unpredictable in the current circumstances.

In March, ahead of Norway taking over the chairmanship of the Arctic Council, Huitfeldt stated that she wouldn't be present at the handover of the chairmanship from Russia to Norway. She explained that only diplomats would ensure the handover, and also expressed that cooperation with Russia was still possible, but not on a political level. She also expressed that it would be difficult to preserve the Arctic Council.

In April, Huitfeldt announced that Norway would be expelling 15 Russian diplomats on the grounds of involvement in intelligence gathering. She branded them "not genuine diplomats" and that their work was a threat against Norwegian interests. She further stated that Norway will make it harder to gain diplomatic status in the country. This also marked the largest expulsion of diplomats conducted by Norway so far.

From 31 May to 1 June, Huitfeldt hosted NATO foreign ministers' summit in Oslo, where she encouraged the swift ascent of Sweden into NATO and argued that they should become a member by the NATO summit in Vilnius in July.

In late August, Huitfeldt informed Verdens Gang that she had breached several impartiality rules with her husband Ola Flem having bought stocks in several weapons and fisheries companies. Both Huitfeldt and her husband apologised for the situation, while prime minister Jonas Gahr Støre expressed that he still had trust in her based on her apology. The Progress Party later asked her to consider resigning when discrepancies in her public revealed and undisclosed information were revealed to contradict each other.

In the wake of the Gaza war, the Ministry of Foreign Affairs initially expressed that it was in no capacity to assist Norwegian citizens stranded in Tel Aviv. However, on 11 October, they backtracked, with Huitfeldt confirming that they would send a plane to aid Norwegian citizens in cooperation with Norwegian Air Shuttle. She additionally criticised Israel's blockade of the Gaza Strip.

On 16 October, Huitfeldt was dismissed in favour of Espen Barth Eide in a cabinet reshuffle as a consequence of her husband's stock trading.

=== Norwegian Ambassador to the United States of America ===
==== Nomination ====
She was rumoured as a possible candidate to become the next Norwegian ambassador to the US some time after her dismissal as foreign minister. This was however controversial due to her not having worked for the Norwegian Foreign Service, while it also being unconventional to nominate a full time politician to an ambassadorial position. Despite this, it was announced in mid-January 2024 that the government would nominate her to become the next ambassador to the US. She was officially nominated on 15 March of the same year. She assumed office and was appointed by then-American President Joe Biden on 26 August of the same year.

Party political offices
Preceded by Trond Giske	Leader of the Workers' Youth League; 1996–2000	Succeeded by Eva Kristin Hansen
Preceded by N/A	Leader of the Labour Party Women's Network; 2007–2019	Succeeded by Anette Trettebergstuen
Political offices
Preceded by Manuela Ramin-Osmundsen	Minister of Children and Equality; 2008–2009	Succeeded by Audun Lysbakken
Preceded by Trond Giske	Minister of Culture; 2009–2012	Succeeded by Hadia Tajik
Preceded by Hanne Bjurstrøm	Minister of Labour and Social Inclusion; 2012–2013	Succeeded by Robert Eriksson
Preceded by Ine Eriksen Søreide	Chair of the Standing Committee on Foreign Affairs and Defence; 2013–2021	Succeeded by Ine Eriksen Søreide
Preceded by Ine Eriksen Søreide	Minister of Foreign Affairs; 2021–2023	Succeeded by Espen Barth Eide
Diplomatic posts
Preceded by Anniken Krutnes	Norwegian Ambassador to the United States; 2024–present	Incumbent
