= Norwegian Barents Secretariat =

Organisation promoting Norway–Russia relations

Coordinates: 65°N 44°E

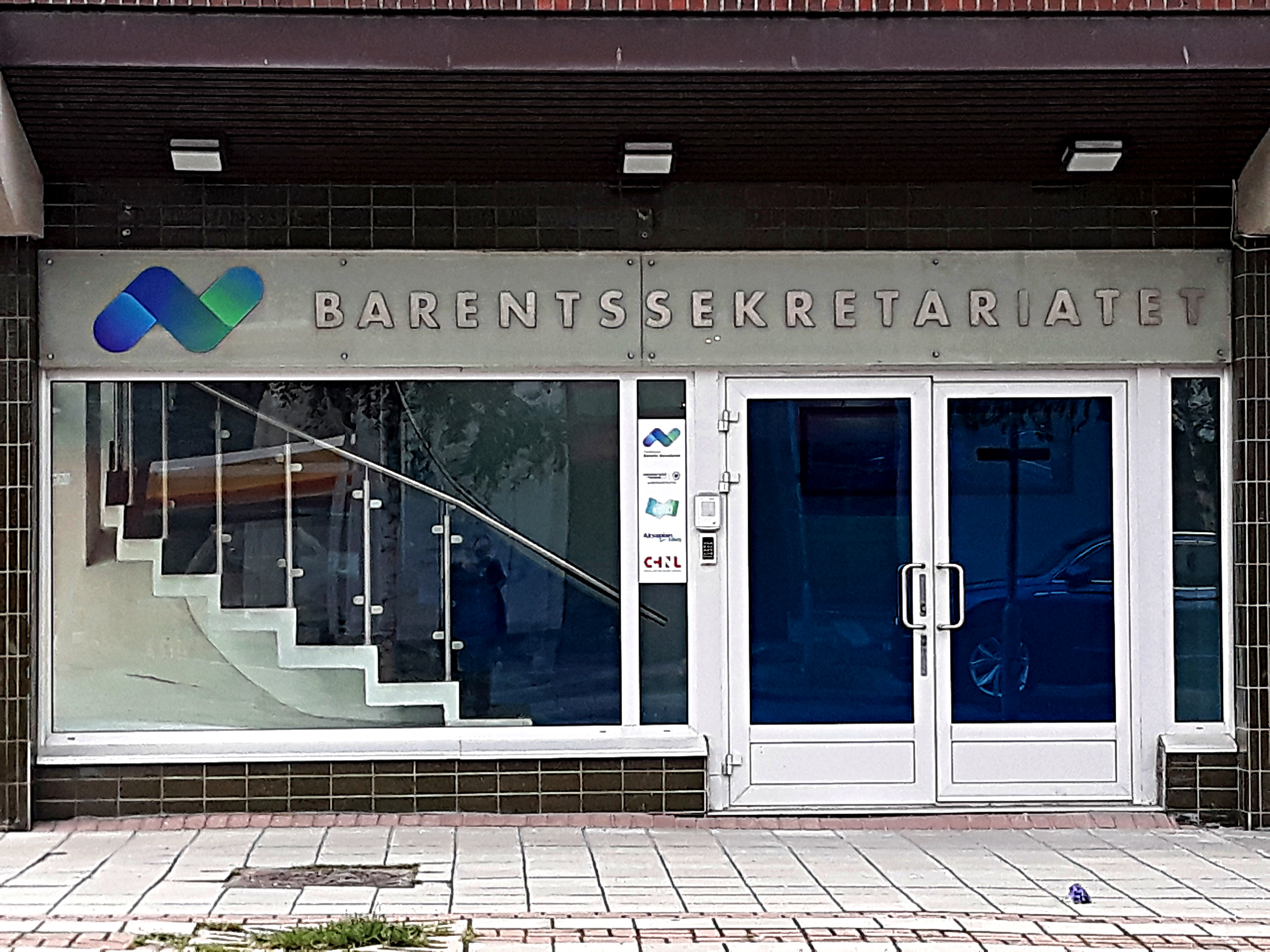
The headquarters of the Norwegian Barents Secretariat in Kirkenes, Norway in August 2019 Photo: Kimberli Mäkäräinen

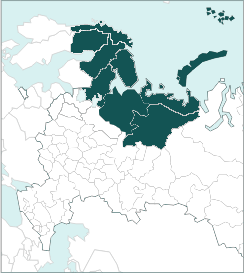
The Barents Region.

The Norwegian Barents Secretariat aims at developing the Norwegian-Russian relations in the north by promoting and funding Norwegian-Russian cooperation projects. As of 2022, the organisation has 11 employees in Kirkenes; its offices are in Arkhangelsk, Murmansk, the Nenets Region and Kirkenes.

On behalf of the Norwegian Ministry of Foreign Affairs, the Secretariat grants funds to bilateral Norwegian-Russian cooperation projects. The Secretariat grants approximately 200 Norwegian-Russian projects annually.

The Secretariat is also a center of competence on Norwegian-Russian relations, by carrying through and finance various types of reviews or reports on relevant topics in the region. The Secretariat also coordinates the national goals with the regional political priorities within the frames of the multilateral Barents Cooperation, and work as a resource center for the councils, committees and working groups of the Barents Cooperation.

Head of the Norwegian Barents Secretariat is Lars Georg Fordal (in office since September 1, 2016).

The online newspaper The Barents Observer, which covers far northern news issues, with news stories from Russia, Norway, Sweden and Finland, published in English and Russian, was established in 2002 and operated under the aegis of the Barents Secretariat between 2005 and 2015. After a conflict between owners and editors, a new website was established in October 2015, owned by its editors.

In March 2026, Russian authorities declared the Norwegian Barents Secretariat an undesirable organization.

== See also ==
- Barents Region
- Northern Dimension
- Sápmi (area)
- Circumpolar arctic
- Pomors
