= The Barents Observer =

Norwegian online newspaper

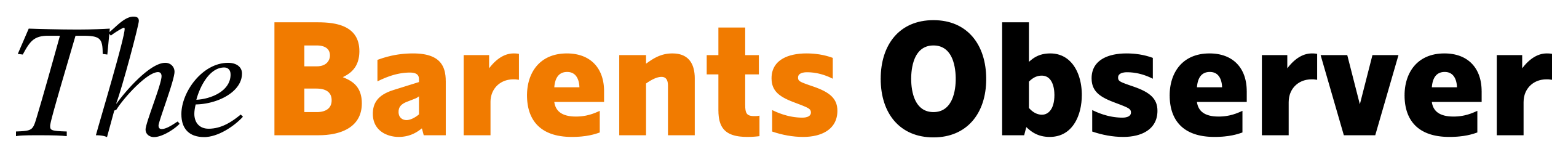
- Format: Online newspaper
- Editor: Thomas Nilsen
- Founded: 2015
- Language: English, Russian, Chinese
- Website: thebarentsobserver.com

The Barents Observer (formally The Independent Barents Observer) is a Norwegian online newspaper which publishes news and op-ed content about the Barents Region in English, Russian and Chinese. The newspaper is based in Kirkenes and is owned by its journalists. It receives financial support from the European Endowment for Democracy, the Nordic Council of Ministers, the Norwegian government, the Fritt Ord foundation, private companies and individuals.

== History ==
The newspaper's predecessor was founded by Atle Staalesen in 2002 as Barents News. It changed its name to BarentsObserver in 2003 and operated under the aegis of the Norwegian Barents Secretariat from 2005 to 2015.

Following a dispute regarding their editorial freedom in 2015, the newspaper's staff left BarentsObserver and subsequently launched today's journalist owned paper, The Independent Barents Observer.

The online newspaper launched its Chinese version in 2019, having previously been published in English and Russian only.

=== 2019 Russian censorship ===
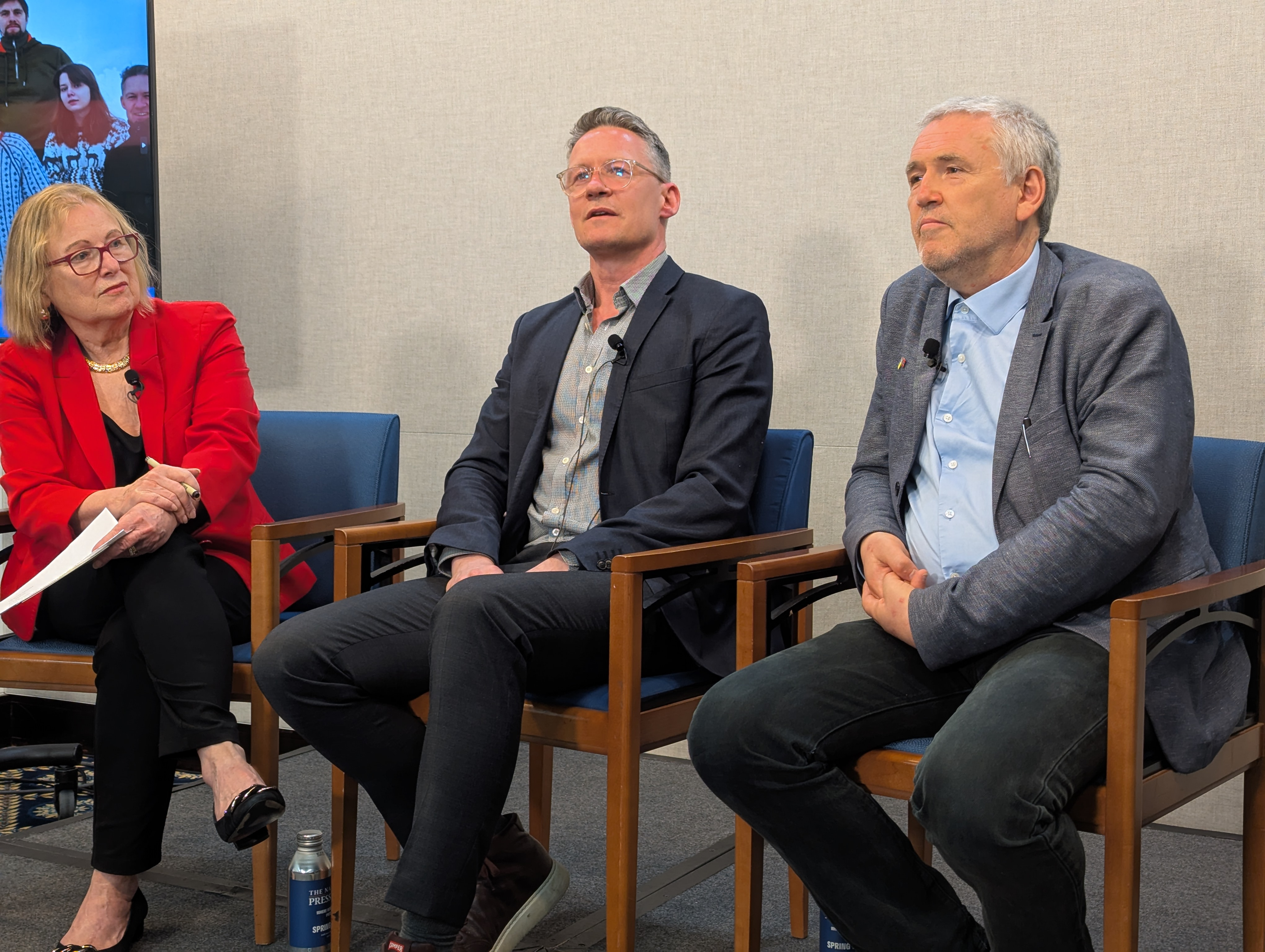
Barents Observer journalists at a 2025 press freedom panel at the National Press Club.

In March 2019, The Barents Observer was blocked for readers in Russia after having published an interview with a homosexual Sámi activist describing his suicidal thoughts. A member of the Russian State Duma supported the blocking, saying that the article expressed "degeneration and decay". The newspaper actively tries to bypass the blockade.

=== 2022 Murmansk recording ===
In 2022, The Barents Observer was offered a video showing a Norwegian diplomat complaining about a hotel room in Murmansk, using undiplomatic language. Thomas Nielsen, the newspaper's editor, decided not to publish the video, justifying his decision by saying that the video was filmed by Russian intelligence. The case was widely covered by other outlets.

On February 18, 2025, The Barents Observer was declared an undesirable organization by the Ministry of Justice of the Russian Federation.
