= Hårek Elvenes =

Norwegian politician (born 1959)

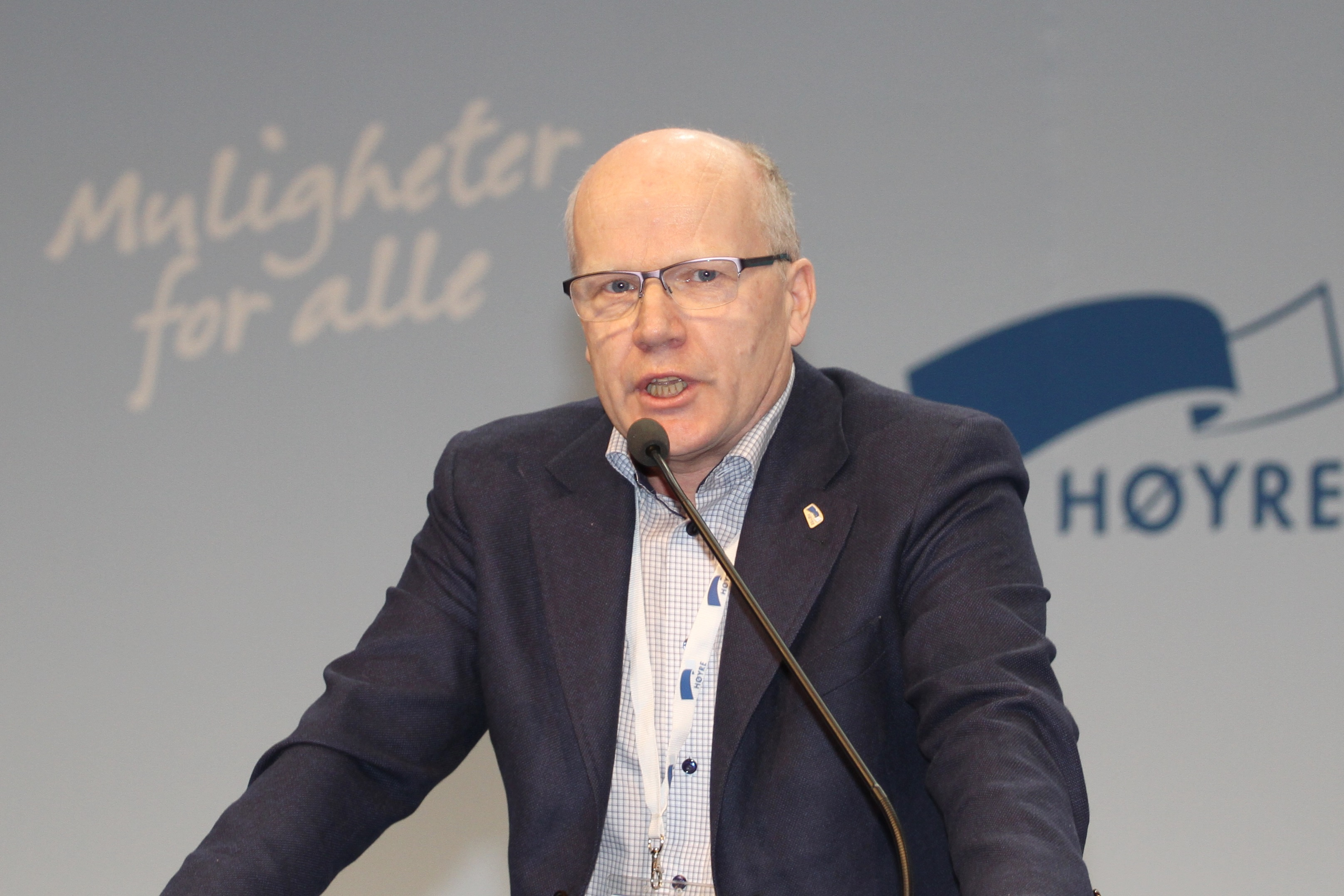

Hårek Elvenes (born 17 June 1959 in Sortland Municipality, Vesterålen) is a Norwegian politician for the Conservative Party.

He was born in Sortland Municipality and finished the science branch of Sortland Upper Secondary School in 1978. He graduated from the Army Engineering College in 1981 and held a diploma in civil engineering. He was an officer in the Norwegian Army (Brigaden i Nord-Norge/Brigade of North-Norway in the engineering company) until 1984.

From 1984 to 1987 he worked in Aker Entreprenør. He graduated with a siv.øk. degree from the Norwegian School of Management in 1991, and took an MBA at the Norwegian School of Economics and Business Administration in 2005. He worked in Veidekke from 1996 to 2005, and is since 2007 the director of Forsvarsbygg Nord-Norge. He lives at Fossum.

He was first elected to the municipal council of Bærum Municipality in 1995, and chaired his local party chapter from 2000 to 2004. He served as a deputy representative to the Norwegian Parliament from the Conservative Party (Høyre) for Akershus during the term 2005–2009 and the term 2009–2013. From 1 to 17 October 2005, he met in Parliament for Jan Petersen as the Parliament convened before the second cabinet Bondevik withdrew.
