= Peter Christian Frølich =

Norwegian lawyer and politician

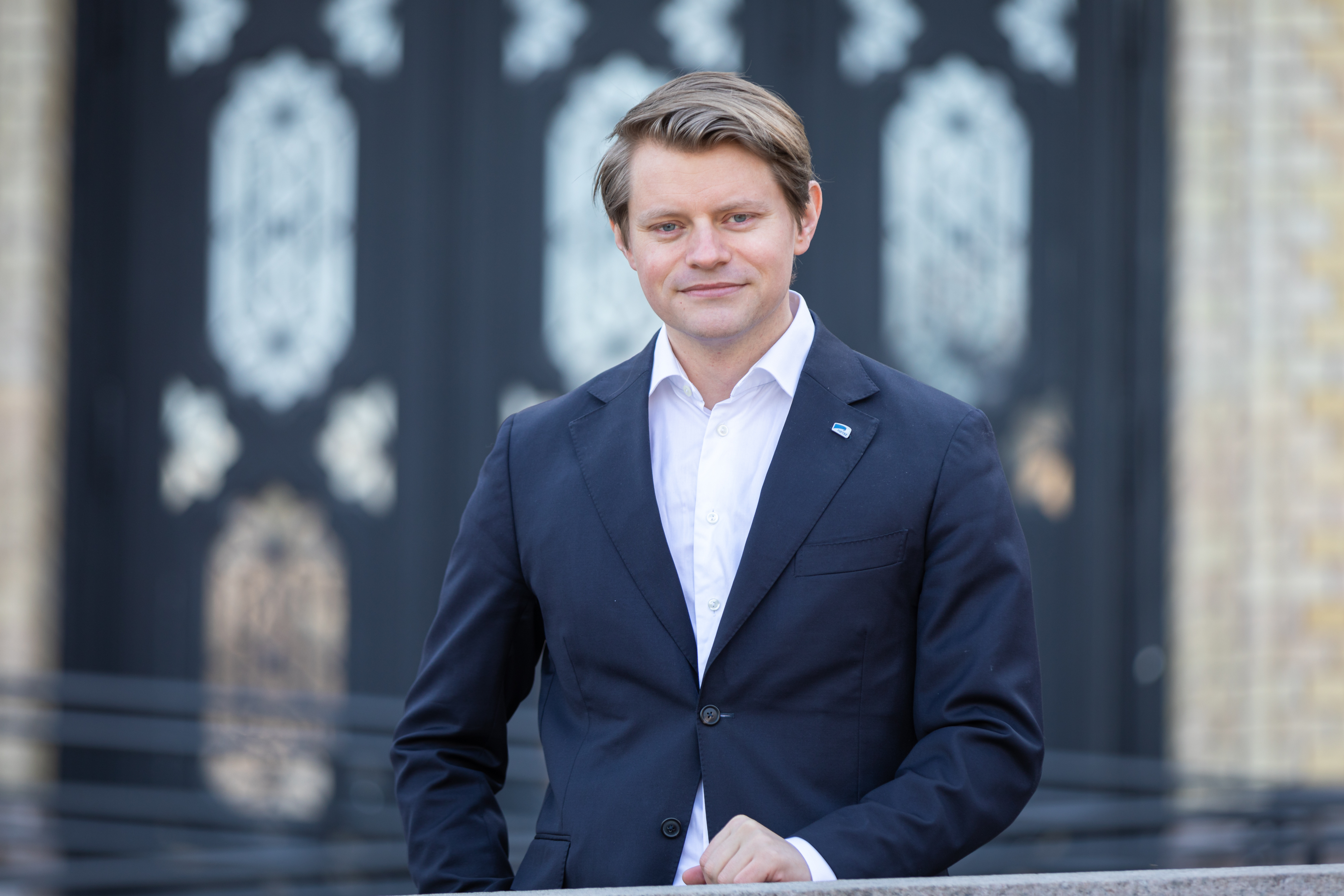

Chair of the Standing Committee on Foreign Affairs and Defence
- Incumbent
- Assumed office 24 March 2026
- First Vice Chair: Nils-Ole Foshaug
- Second Vice Chair: Himanshu Gulati
- Preceded by: Ine Eriksen Søreide

Chair of the Standing Committee on Scrutiny and Constitutional Affairs
- In office 28 October 2021 – 30 September 2025
- First Vice Chair: Sverre Myrli; Lubna Jaffery; Frode Jacobsen
- Second Vice Chair: Svein Harberg
- Preceded by: Dag Terje Andersen
- Succeeded by: Per-Willy Amundsen

Member of the Storting
- Incumbent
- Assumed office 1 October 2013
- Constituency: Hordaland

Personal details
- Born: 17 September 1987 (age 39) Bergen, Hordaland, Norway
- Party: Conservative
- Spouse: Hanne Schult
- Education: University of Bergen

Military service
- Allegiance: Norway
- Branch/service: Norwegian Armed Forces
- Years of service: 2006–2007

Peter Christian Frølich (born 17 September 1987) is a Norwegian lawyer and politician for the Conservative Party. He has served as a member of parliament for Hordaland since 2013.

== Early life ==
Frølich was educated at Bergen Handelsgymnasium, an upper secondary school in Bergen, Norway, from 2003 to 2006.

Frølich was conscripted into the Norwegian Armed Forces from 2006 to 2007.

Frølich attended the University of Bergen from 2007 until 2012, graduating with a Master's degree in Law. During his studies, Frølich worked as a Security officer for G4S.

== Political career ==
=== Local politics ===
Frølich was elected to Bergen City Council in 2011 and served there until 2015.

=== Party politics ===
Frølich had been considered as one of the candidates to potentially succeed Erna Solberg after she announced her resignation following the 2025 parliamentary election. Frølich later announced that he wouldn't seek the leadership due to family reasons, but was open to become deputy leader instead. In December, he withdrew his deputy leadership candidacy and instead expressed interest in succeeding Ine Eriksen Søreide as chair of the Standing Committee on Foreign Affairs and Defence if she is elected party leader.

=== Parliament ===
Frølich was elected as a member of the Storting for Hordaland in the 2013 election. He has been re-elected since.

Frølich joined the Standing Committee on Justice in 2013. He was promoted to Second Vice Chair in 2017.

In 2021, he additionally became chair of the Standing Committee on Scrutiny and Constitutional Affairs. As chair of the Standing Committee on Scrutiny and Constitutional Affairs, he oversaw the committee's inquires into impartiality and stock trading issues involving cabinet ministers of the Støre government and former prime minister Erna Solberg. He was also the main sponsor for an amendment to the Norwegian constitution, which would ensure judicial independence of the courts from any political interference in the event of authoritarian rule. The amendment was unanimously approved both in the Standing Committee on Scrutiny and Constitutional Affairs and the full parliament.

Following the 2025 election, he moved to the Standing Committee on Foreign Affairs and Defence and additionally became the party's spokesperson on defence. In March 2026, he succeeded Ine Eriksen Søreide as the chair of the committee after she had been elected leader of the Conservative Party.

In January 2024, he was given an Order of Merit, 3rd Class medal for his personal contribution in aiding Ukrainian society. He was rewarded another medal in May, the Medal of Honour by the Ukrainian National Military Academy for his volunteering aid to the country. In September, he was rewarded with the Defender of the Motherland Medal.

== Civic career ==
In 2013, Frølich started working as an associate lawyer at Norwegian law firm Kluge Advokatfirma.

== Personal life ==
Frølich identified Winston Churchill as his political idol. Frølich is married to Hanne Schult.

In August 2026, Frølich suffered a severe heart attack after exercising and was swiftly hospitalised. As a result, he would go on a four to six weeks absence from parliamentary duties while in recovery. He was released from hospital in October.

== Honours ==
Ribbon	Description	Notes
	Order of Merit, 3rd Class	Ukraine
	Defender of the Motherland Medal	Ukraine

Political offices
Preceded by Kjell Ingolf Ropstad	Second Vice Chair of the Standing Committee on Justice; 2017–2021	Succeeded by Sveinung Stensland
Preceded by Dag Terje Andersen	Chair of the Standing Committee on Scrutiny and Constitutional Affairs; 2021–2025	Succeeded by Per-Willy Amundsen
Preceded by Ine Eriksen Søreide	Chair of the Standing Committee on Foreign Affairs and Defence; 2026–present	Incumbent
