= Høyer-Ellefsen =

Norwegian company

Høyer-Ellefsen A/S was a Norwegian company. It was established in 1896 by the ingenieur Sigurd Høyer-Ellefsen. He was managing director until 1925. In 1902, it became a stock based company. In 1981, the company was taken over by Orkla, that merged the company with Astrup & Aubert (est. 1933), creating Astrup Høyer. Astrup Høyer was taken over by Aker Norcem (later Aker AS) in 1986 and was rebranded to Aker Entreprenør, bringing an end to the Høyer name at the company. Aker Entreprenør would be acquired by Veidekke in 1991.
