= List of dignitaries at the state funeral of Shinzo Abe =

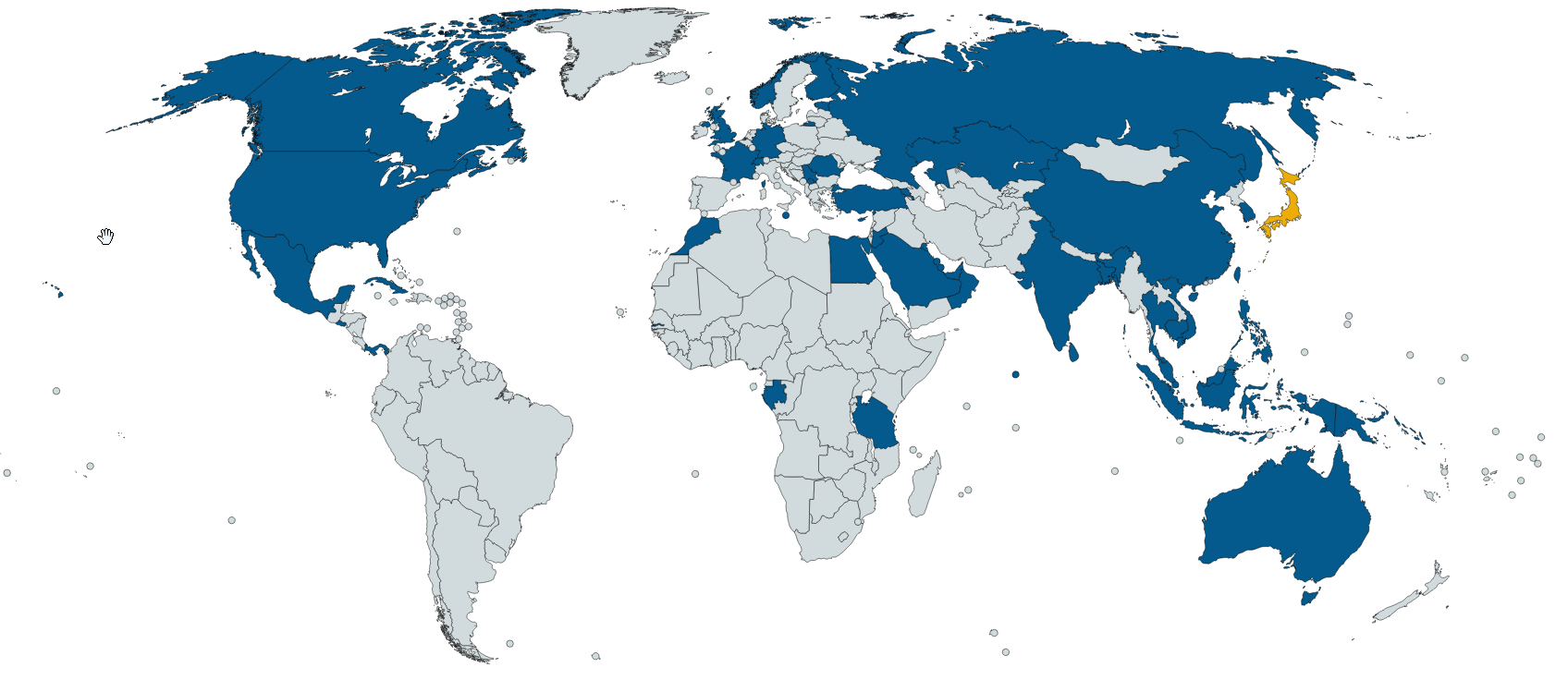
Countries from which at least one representative attended the state funeral of Shinzo Abe

The state funeral of Shinzo Abe, former prime minister of Japan and serving member of the House of Representatives who was assassinated on 8 July 2022, was held on 27 September 2022.

The funeral, which took place at the Nippon Budokan venue in Chiyoda, Tokyo, was expected to be attended by roughly 4,300 people, including around 700 international attendees. Out of the foreign attendees, 49 top-level foreign leaders and 218 foreign delegates, including 101 ambassadors and representatives based in Japan, were present at the state funeral.

== Japan ==
=== Imperial family ===
- The Crown Prince and Crown Princess
  - Princess Kako of Akishino
- Princess Tomohito of Mikasa
  - Princess Akiko of Mikasa
- The Princess Takamado
  - Princess Tsuguko of Takamado

=== Political ===
- Fumio Kishida, Prime Minister of Japan, and Yuko Kishida
  - Yoshihide Suga, former Prime Minister of Japan (2020–2021), and Mariko Suga
  - Yoshihiko Noda, former Prime Minister of Japan (2011–2012)
  - Tarō Asō, former Prime Minister of Japan (2008–2009)
  - Yasuo Fukuda, former Prime Minister of Japan (2007–2008)
  - Junichiro Koizumi, former Prime Minister of Japan (2001–2006)
  - Yoshirō Mori, former Prime Minister of Japan (2000–2001)
- Hiroyuki Hosoda, Speaker of the House of Representatives
- Hidehisa Otsuji, President of the House of Councillors
- Saburo Tokura, Chief Justice of the Supreme Court

== International ==
=== Royalty ===
- The Crown Prince of Bahrain (representing the King of Bahrain)
- Princess Sonam Dechan Wangchuck of Bhutan (representing the King of Bhutan)
- The King of Jordan
- Sheikh Ahmad Nasser Al-Mohammed Al-Sabah, Minister of Foreign Affairs of Kuwait (representing the Emir of Kuwait)
- The Emir of Qatar
- Prince Faisal bin Farhan Al Saud, Minister of Foreign Affairs of Saudi Arabia (representing the King of Saudi Arabia)
- Khaled bin Mohamed Al Nahyan, Member of Abu Dhabi Executive Council and Chairman of Abu Dhabi Executive Office (representing the President of the United Arab Emirates)

=== Heads of state and government ===
- Anthony Albanese, Prime Minister of Australia
  - John Howard, former Prime Minister of Australia (1996–2007)
  - Tony Abbott, former Prime Minister of Australia (2013–2015)
  - Malcolm Turnbull, former Prime Minister of Australia (2015–2018)
- Hun Sen, Prime Minister of Cambodia
- Azali Assoumani, President of Comoros
- Manuel Marrero Cruz, Prime Minister of Cuba
- Rose Christiane Raponda, Prime Minister of Gabon
- Narendra Modi, Prime Minister of India
- Albin Kurti, Prime Minister of Kosovo
- Moeketsi Majoro, Prime Minister of Lesotho
- Xavier Bettel, Prime Minister of Luxembourg
- Natalia Gavrilița, Prime Minister of Moldova
- Luvsannamsrain Oyun-Erdene, Prime Minister of Mongolia
- Aziz Akhannouch, Prime Minister of Morocco (representing the King of Morocco)
- Surangel Whipps Jr., President of Palau
- James Marape, Prime Minister of Papua New Guinea
- Nicolae Ciucă, Prime Minister of Romania
- Ana Brnabić, Prime Minister of Serbia
- Lee Hsien Loong, Prime Minister of Singapore
- Han Duck-soo, Prime Minister of South Korea
- Ranil Wickremesinghe, President of Sri Lanka
- Kassim Majaliwa, Prime Minister of Tanzania
- Faure Gnassingbé, President of Togo
- Nguyễn Xuân Phúc, President of Vietnam

=== Former leaders and officials ===
- Nicolas Sarkozy, former President of France (2007–2012)
- Christian Wulff, former President of Germany (2010–2012)
- Matteo Renzi, former Prime Minister of Italy (2014–2016)
- Rami Hamdallah, former Prime Minister of the State of Palestine (2013–2019)
- Eduardo Ferro Rodrigues, former President of the Assembly of the Republic of Portugal (2015–2022)
- (Switzerland) Didier Burkhalter, former President of the Swiss Confederation (2014)
- (Taiwan) Frank Hsieh, former Premier of the Republic of China (2005–2006)
  - Wang Jin-pyng, former President of the Legislative Yuan (1999–2016)
  - Su Jia-chyuan, former President of the Legislative Yuan (2016–2020)
- Gurbanguly Berdimuhamedow, former President of Turkmenistan (2007–2022)
- Theresa May, former Prime Minister of the United Kingdom (2016–2019)
- Kembo Mohadi, former Second Vice-President of Zimbabwe (2017–2021)

=== Vice presidents and deputies ===
- Themba Masuku, Deputy Prime Minister of Eswatini
- Ma'ruf Amin, Vice President of Indonesia
- Mukhtar Tleuberdi, Deputy Prime Minister and Minister of Foreign Affairs of Kazakhstan
- Wopke Hoekstra, Deputy Prime Minister and Minister of Foreign Affairs of the Kingdom of the Netherlands
- Sara Duterte, Vice President of the Philippines and Secretary of Education
- Manasseh Maelanga, Deputy Prime Minister of the Solomon Islands
- Don Pramudwinai, Deputy Prime Minister and Minister of Foreign Affairs of Thailand
- Kamala Harris, Vice President of the United States of America (sent on behalf of President Joe Biden)
  - Katherine Tai, United States Trade Representative
  - Bill Hagerty, United States Senator (former Ambassador of the United States to Japan)
  - Philip H. Gordon, Assistant to the Vice President for National Security Affairs
  - Michael Mullen, former Chairman of the Joint Chiefs of Staff
  - Richard Armitage, former Deputy Secretary of State

=== Speakers of national legislatures ===
- Hakob Arshakyan, Vice President of the National Assembly of Armenia
- Annita Demetriou, House President of Cyprus
- (Estonia) Jüri Ratas, President of the Estonian Riigikogu
- Urška Klakočar Zupančič, Speaker of the National Assembly of Slovenia

=== Foreign ministers ===
- Abdullatif bin Rashid Al Zayani, Minister of Foreign Affairs of Bahrain
- AK Abdul Momen, Minister of Foreign Affairs of Bangladesh
- Albert Shingiro, Minister of Foreign Affairs and Development Cooperation of Burundi
- Alexandra Hill Tinoco, Minister of Foreign Affairs of El Salvador
- Pekka Haavisto, Minister of Foreign Affairs of Finland
- (The Gambia) Mamadou Tangara, Minister of Foreign Affairs of Gambia
- Abdulla Shahid, Minister of Foreign Affairs of the Maldives
- Ian Borg, Minister of Foreign Affairs of Malta
- Marcelo Ebrard, Secretary of Foreign Affairs of Mexico
- Anniken Huitfeldt, Minister of Foreign Affairs of Norway
- Erika Mouynes, Minister of Foreign Affairs of Panama
- Adaljiza Magno, Minister of Foreign Affairs and Cooperation of Timor-Leste
- Mevlüt Çavuşoğlu, Minister of Foreign Affairs of Turkey
- James Cleverly, Secretary of State for Foreign, Commonwealth and Development Affairs of the United Kingdom

=== Other government officials ===
- François-Philippe Champagne, Federal Industry Minister of Canada (representing Prime Minister Justin Trudeau)
- Kamel al-Wazir, Minister of Transport of Egypt
- Edmund Bartlett, Minister of Tourism of Jamaica
- Javad Owji, Minister of Petroleum of Iran
- Datuk Seri Mohamed Azmin Ali, Senior Minister of International Trade and Industry of Malaysia (representing Prime Minister Ismail Sabri Yaakob)
- Sheikh Salim bin Mustahail al Mashani, Adviser at the Diwan of Royal Court of Oman (representing the Sultan of Oman)
- Sultan Al Jaber, Minister of Industry and Advance Technology of the United Arab Emirates

=== Ambassadors and heads of diplomatic missions ===
- Candice Pitts, Ambassador of Belize to Taiwan
- Mohamed Abu Bakr, Ambassador of Egypt to Japan
- Cristóbal Adalberto Herrera Dubón, Ambassador of Guatemala to Japan
- Mirzosharif Jalolov, Ambassador of Tajikistan to Japan
- Mohamed Elloumi, Ambassador of Tunisia to Japan
- Rahm Emanuel, Ambassador of the United States to Japan
  - Caroline Kennedy, Ambassador of the United States to the Commonwealth of Australia (former Ambassador of the United States to Japan)
  - Tom Schieffer, former Ambassador of the United States to Japan
  - John Roos, former Ambassador of the United States to Japan

=== Other representatives ===
- Verónica Alcocer, First Lady of Colombia
- Mikhail Shvydkoy, envoy of the President of Russia on International Cultural Cooperation (Note: Neither Vladimir Putin, the President of Russia, nor government officials representing the Russian delegation were invited to the state funeral as Japan has sanctioned many Russian officials following its invasion of Ukraine that began in February.)
- (Taiwan) Annie Lee, daughter of former President of the Republic of China Lee Teng-hui
- (China) Wan Gang, Vice Chairman of the National Committee of the Chinese People's Political Consultative Conference

== International organizations ==
- (Europe) Charles Michel, President of the European Council
- Fatih Birol, executive director of International Energy Agency
- Thomas Bach, President of the International Olympic Committee
