= Barents Euro-Arctic Council =

Intergovernmental organization

- Abbreviation: BEAC
- Formation: 1993, Kirkenes Declaration
- Type: Intergovernmental Organization
- Purpose: Forum for intergovernmental cooperation in the Barents region
- Members: 6 members: Denmark; Finland; Iceland; Norway; Sweden; European Commission; 9 observers: Canada; France; Germany; Italy; Japan; Netherlands; Poland; United Kingdom; United States
- Website: barents-council.org

The Barents Euro-Arctic Council (BEAC) is the official body for inter-governmental co-operation in the Barents Region. It seeks solutions wherever and whenever the countries can achieve more together than by working on their own. Cooperation in the Barents Euro-Arctic Region was launched in 1993 on two levels: intergovernmental Barents Euro-Arctic Council (BEAC) and interregional Barents Regional Council (BRC). The overall objective of Barents cooperation has been sustainable development.

In 2008, the International Barents Secretariat was established in Kirkenes. The secretariat supports the multilateral activities within the Barents Euro-Arctic Council and Barents Regional Council and secures the coherence and efficiency of the cooperation. The IBS maintains the archives of the Barents Euro-Arctic council and the Barents Regional Council and works as an information database.

Where appropriate, there is also coordination with the relevant activities of the Nordic Council of Ministers, the Council of the Baltic Sea States, the Arctic Council and the Northern Dimension.

Finnish authorities said (Q4 2024), that they have decided that after next year, the country will no longer be a member.

== History ==
During the Cold War the Barents region was an area of military confrontation. The underlying premise was that close cooperation secures political long-term stability and reduces possible tensions. This objective has already been successfully achieved. The Barents cooperation has fostered a new sense of unity and closer contact among the people of the region which is an excellent basis for further progress.

=== Kirkenes Declaration ===
BEAC was founded at the conference on cooperation in the Barents Euro-Arctic Region took place in Kirkenes (Norway) on 11 January 1993 in accordance with the Kirkenes Declaration of 1993. The Ministers of Foreign Affairs or representatives of Denmark, Finland, Iceland, Norway, the Russian Federation, Sweden and the Commission of the European Communities participated in the conference, which was also attended by observers from the United States of America, Canada, France, Germany, Japan, Poland, and the United Kingdom. The BEAC was created in order to provide impetus to existing cooperation and consider new initiatives and proposals. The objective of the work of the council is to promote sustainable development in the Barents region, bearing in mind the principles and recommendations set out in the Rio Declaration and Agenda 21 of UNCED.

The regional representatives together with a representative from the indigenous peoples signed a co-operation protocol establishing the Barents Regional Council (BRC) to support the cooperation in the Barents region in regional level at the same time as the BEAC was established. The aim of the BRC is to cooperate in the regional level following the Kirkenes Declaration.

== Barents Euro-Arctic Council ==
=== Members ===
- Denmark
- Finland
- Iceland
- Norway
- Russia (leaving in September 2023)
- Sweden
- European Commission

=== Observers ===
- Canada
- France
- Germany
- Italy
- Japan
- Netherlands
- Poland
- United Kingdom
- United States

=== Chairmanship ===
The chairmanship of the Barents Euro-Arctic Council rotates between Finland, Norway, Russia and Sweden. Finland holds the chairmanship for the period 2021–2023.

List of holders of chairmanship
Years	Country	Chairmanship Program
2021−23	Finland	
2019−21	Norway	
2017−19	Sweden	
2015−17	Russia	
2013−15	Finland	
2011−13	Norway	
2009−11	Sweden	
2007−09	Russia	

=== Ministerial Meetings ===
Ministers of the four Barents countries (Norway, Sweden, Finland, Russia) have met regularly since the Kirkenes Declaration in 1993. The BEAC Foreign Minister's Sessions is the highest decision-making body in the whole Barents cooperation. Foreign ministers meet biannually with the transferring the BEAC Chairmanship to the next country. The XVIII BEAC Foreign Ministers' meeting took place in Tromsø, Norway on 26 October 2021. Also Prime Ministers, Ministers of Environment, Transport, Culture, Competitiveness and Health have met and discussed topical issues. The meeting documents and joint declarations can be found here.

Foreign Ministers Declarations
Year	
2011	Joint Communiqué of the 13th Ministerial Session Joint Communiqué of the 13th Ministerial Session RUS
2013	Joint Communique
2015	Joint Communiqué
2017	Joint Declaration
2019	Declaration
2021	Declaration Declaration RUS

=== Committee of Senior Officials ===
The Committee of Senior Officials (CSO) is the BEAC body responsible for coordinating the cooperation activities and organizing the work within BEAC between the meetings at the Foreign Minister level. The CSO is represented by the civil servants from the governments of the member states and the European Union. Representatives of the observer countries have the right to participate. The CSO meets on a regular basis 4-5 times per year in the country holding the Chairmanship of the BEAC. The Chairperson of the CSO is a representative of the government of the chair country.

== Barents Regional Council (BRC) ==
=== Members ===
- Finland: Kainuu, Lapland, Oulu, North Karelia
- Norway: Nordland, Troms, Finnmark
- Sweden: Norrbotten, Västerbotten

=== Observers ===
- Council of Christian Churches in the Barents Region
- Parliamentary Association of North West Russia

The BRC unites fourteen counties or similar sub-national entities from the Barents Region and the chairmanship of the BRC rotates between these counties. Nenets, Russia, is the chair of the BRC for the period 2021–2023.

=== Chairmanship ===
The chairmanship rotates biennially between participating regions in Finland, Norway, the Russian Federation and Sweden.

Chairs of the BRC
Years	Region	Chairmanship Program
2021–23	Nenets Autonomous Okrug	
2019–21	Västerbotten	
2017–19	Finnmark	
2015–17	Kainuu	
2013–15	Arkhangelsk	
2011–13	Norrbotten	
2009-11	Troms County Council	
2007-09	Council of Oulu Region	

=== Meetings and Priorities ===
The BRC meets twice a year and is composed of the highest regional representatives of the participating regions as well as representatives of all three groups of indigenous peoples of the Barents region. Regional Committee (RC) prepares the meetings. RC consists of civil servants from member counties.

Priorities for the regional cooperation are identified in the Barents Program which is a framework for the inter-regional Barents cooperation. The program is an operational framework to strengthen the Barents cooperation and offer a joint platform to maintain stable development and people-to-people cooperation in the North.

== Working groups ==
The two councils have established thematic Working Groups. The Working Groups constitute a cross-border platform for exchange between civil servants and professionals in respective field both on the national and regional level. Over the past years, the Working Groups have also implemented several projects.

=== Working Group of Indigenous Peoples ===
The representatives of the three indigenous peoples, the Sámi, the Nenets and the Vepsians, cooperate in the Working Group of Indigenous Peoples (WGIP). It has an advisory role in both the BEAC and the BRC which means that their participation is welcome in all Barents Working Groups. The WGIP Chair is also member of the Committee of Senior Officials (CSO) and the Barents Regional Committee, and that they are always represented at the BEAC Ministerial Sessions and the Barents Regional Council meetings.

=== Barents Regional Youth Council ===
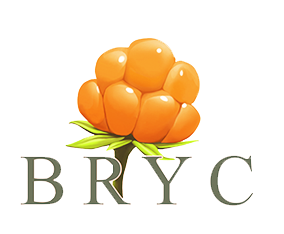
Logo of the Barents Regional Youth Council

Barents Regional Youth Council (BRYC) consists of youth representatives from Northern regions of Finland, Norway, Russia and Sweden and has an indigenous youth representative from one of the indigenous peoples of the Barents Region. BRYC promotes the interests of young people living in the Barents region. It aims to strengthen people-to-people cooperation and empower young people to participate actively. BRYC members are elected by youth councils or chosen by their county administration. The council meets two times a year to discuss youth activities of the region. BRYC Annual Meeting and Annual Event are the main activities of the BRYC.

=== List of the BEAC Working Groups ===
- Health and Social Issues
- Education and Research
- Culture
- Forest Sector
- Tourism
- Transport and Logistics
- Business Co-operation
- Environment
- Youth Issues
- Rescue Co-operation
- Indigenous Peoples
- Barents Regional Youth Council

=== Practical Cooperation in the Working Groups ===
==== Barents Scholarship for Cultural Cooperation ====
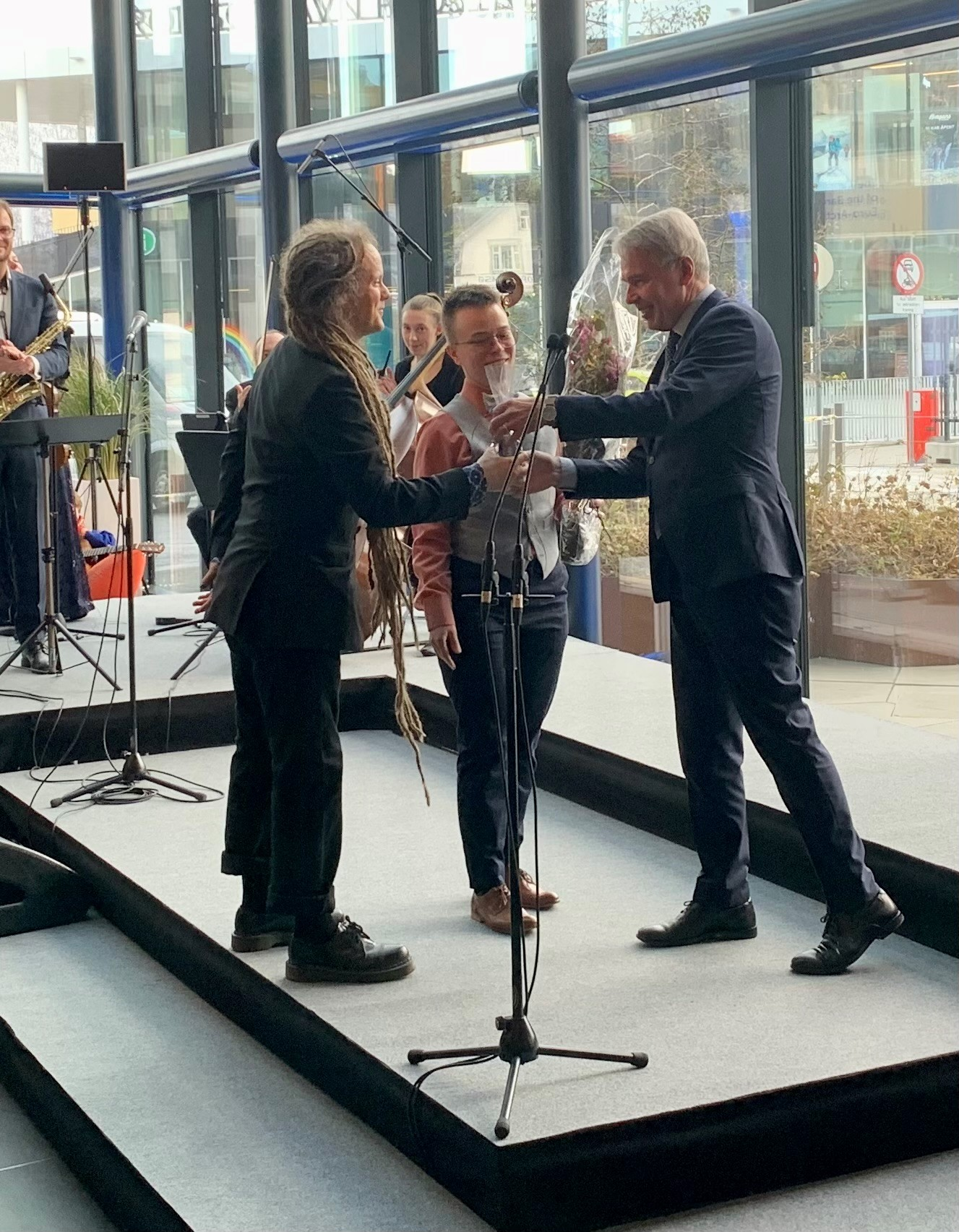
The Finnish scholarship recipient was The Artists’ Association of Lapland in Tromsø, Norway 2021

Barents Scholarship for Cultural Cooperation was established by the Ministers of Culture of the Barents Euro-Arctic Council in 2016. The scholarships have been awarded in Arkhangelsk in 2017, in Umeå in 2019 and in Tromsø in 2021, once per BEAC presidency. Scholarships are awarded to professional artists and artistic associations within the cultural field in the Barents region. Scholarships are based on an overall assessment of experience and ambitions, artistic quality in previous work and Barents affiliation.

==== Barents Environmental Hot Spots ====
Barents environmental hot spots are major polluters and issues imposing environmental hazards to surrounding communities and nature. The hot spot list from 2003 consists of 42 hot spots from various sectors such as mining and metallurgy, pulp and paper, water and wastewater located in the Russian part of the Barents region. In 2005 Environment Ministers of the four Barents countries defined a goal to launch investment projects in all Barents Environmental Hot Spots aiming to eliminate them. Subgroup on Hot Spots Exclusion was established under the Working Group on Environment to facilitate the process. Significant environmental improvements have been achieved and 12 full hot spots and 3 partial ones have been eliminated. Work at other sites is being continued.

==== Nature protection and water issues ====
The Subgroup on Nature and Water (SNW) works with biodiversity conservation, protected areas, sustainable forestry management, sustainable management of water resources and water use, transboundary water bodies, mitigation and adaptation to climate change and ecosystem approach. Work is based on projects.

==== Barents Rescue Cooperation ====
Aim of the Barents rescue cooperation is to improve the possibilities of the rescue service agencies to cooperate across the national, federal and regional borders on emergency and rescue issues. It is possible to provide assistance more effectively, faster and at lower operating cost in the region of long distances, sparsely populated rural communities, limited rescue personnel and equipment, restricted means for transport and hospital resources available in case of larger accidents. Agreement on Cooperation within the field of Emergency Prevention, Preparedness and Response defines the objectives and scope of the cooperation. The Committee has developed the Barents Joint Rescue Manual which is the operational tool of the rescue cooperation. Rescue cooperation is practiced in the Barents Rescue Exercises organized every third year.

Barents Euro-Arctic Transport Area

Barents Euro-Arctic Transport Area (BEATA) is established to strengthen cooperation in order to create an efficient transport system in the Barents Region. BEATA cooperation integrates the different means of transport including border crossing points, customs co-operation, maintenance and reconstruction as well as new projects to improve infrastructure. Barents Region Transport and Logistics (BRTL) action plan is collected under three key development areas which are development of industrial ecosystems, transport corridors and platforms for information sharing. The BRTL is directed to be a road map and action plan for regional level cooperation to raise up questions, development needs and regional special characteristics related to transport and logistics topics. The action plan is based on series of projects.

== See also ==
- Homepage – Barents Euro-Arctic Council
- Homepage – Barents Regional Youth Council
- Intergovernmental organization
