= Ine Eriksen Søreide =

Norwegian politician (born 1976)

Ine Eriksen Søreide MP
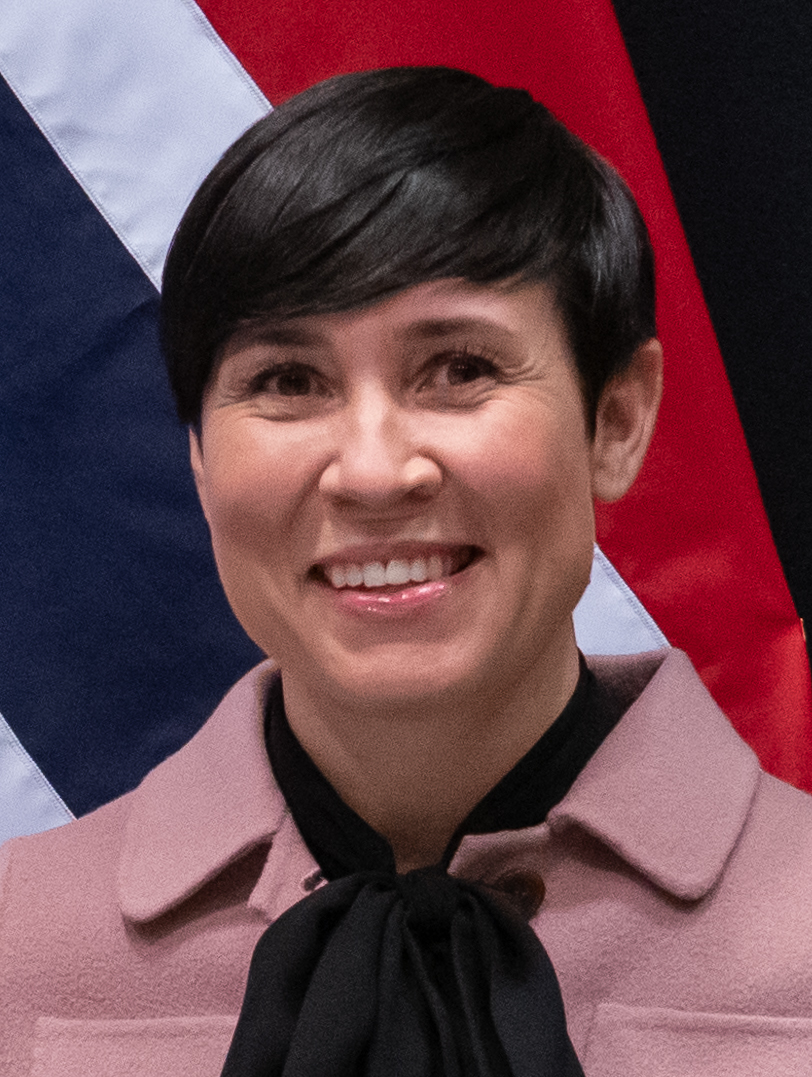
- Søreide in 2021

Leader of the Conservative Party
- Incumbent
- Assumed office 14 February 2026
- First Deputy: Henrik Asheim
- Second Deputy: Ola Svenneby
- Preceded by: Erna Solberg

Minister of Foreign Affairs
- In office 20 October 2017 – 14 October 2021
- Prime Minister: Erna Solberg
- Preceded by: Børge Brende
- Succeeded by: Anniken Huitfeldt

Minister of Defence
- In office 16 October 2013 – 20 October 2017
- Prime Minister: Erna Solberg
- Preceded by: Anne-Grete Strøm-Erichsen
- Succeeded by: Frank Bakke-Jensen

Member of the Norwegian Parliament
- Incumbent
- Assumed office 19 October 2001
- Deputy: Heidi Nordby Lunde; Mathilde Tybring-Gjedde; Michael Tetzschner
- Constituency: Oslo

Leader of the Young Conservatives
- In office 24 June 2000 – 20 June 2004
- Preceded by: John-Ragnar Aarset
- Succeeded by: Torbjørn Røe Isaksen

Personal details
- Born: Ine Marie Eriksen; 2 May 1976 (age 50) Lørenskog, Akershus, Norway
- Party: Conservative
- Spouse: Øystein Eriksen Søreide (m. 2006, sep.)
- Education: University of Tromsø

Ine Marie Eriksen Søreide (born 2 May 1976) is a Norwegian politician who has been the leader of the Conservative Party since 2026. She previously served as the Minister of Defence from 2013 to 2017, and the Minister of Foreign Affairs from 2017 to 2021, the first woman to hold the latter position. She has also been a member of the Storting for Oslo since 2005.

== Career ==
=== Party politics ===
Born in Lørenskog in 1976, Søreide studied law at the University of Tromsø, while at university she joined the Conservative Party and got involved in local politics. In 2000, she became a member of the Conservative Party Central Executive Committee and leader of the Norwegian Young Conservatives. Søreide started work as a producer at Metropol TV.

After Jan Tore Sanner announced he was stepping down as deputy leader, Søreide was mentioned as a possible candidate to succeed him, alongside Henrik Asheim and Nikolai Astrup. However, she announced on 14 February 2022 that she wouldn't be seeking the deputy leadership.

After Erna Solberg resigned as leader of the Conservative Party following the party's loss at the 2025 parliamentary election, Søreide was seen as the frontrunner to succeed her, alongside Astrup, Asheim and Peter Christian Frølich. Despite being the clear favourite, Søreide didn't confirm her candidacy until November. The party's election committee officially nominated her as leader on 11 December, with Asheim and Ola Svenneby as deputy leaders. The trio were formally elected at the party's extrodinary convention on 14 February 2026.

=== Parliament ===
She was also elected a Deputy Member of the Storting for Oslo in 1997, and was re-elected in 2001. Following Metropol's closure Eriksen Søreide joined Grette Law Firm as a trainee. She was elected to Parliament in the 2001 election, and was re-elected in 2005, 2009, 2013, 2017 and 2021.

Following the Solberg Cabinet's defeat in the 2021 election, Søreide became the chair of the Standing Committee on Foreign Affairs and Defence, a position she previously held from 2009 to 2013.

=== Minister of Defence ===
After the election victory following the 2013 election, Søreide was appointed minister of defence in the Solberg cabinet.

In an interview in connection with the annexation of Crimea by the Russian Federation in 2014, Søreide called for higher armaments efforts from all European NATO states.

In the summer of 2013, while Anne-Grete Strøm-Erichsen was still Minister of Defence, the Storting decided to introduce gender-neutral conscription in the Norwegian Armed Forces.

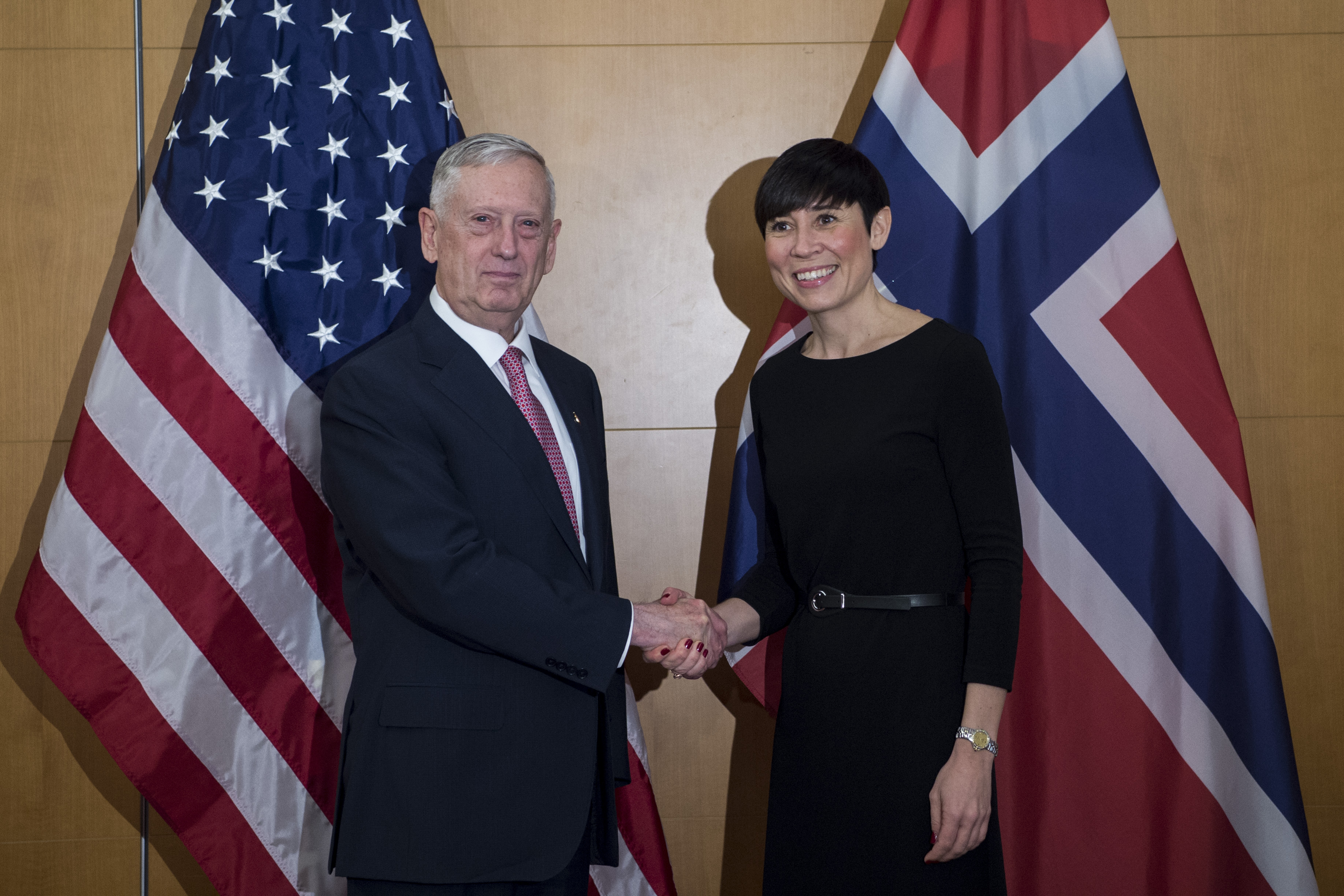
Søreide meets with U.S. Secretary of Defense Jim Mattis in Munich, Germany in February 2017.

In February 2017, ahead of the NATO summit in May, Søreide expressed that it wasn't realistic to increase to two percent of BNP on defence spending in the 20-year period given. This goal was never reached during her tenure, though the defence spending did increase year by year.

=== Minister of Foreign Affairs ===
Following the 2017 election, Søreide was appointed minister of foreign affairs, succeeding Børge Brende, who had been appointed president of the World Economic Forum. She was also the first woman to be appointed to the position.

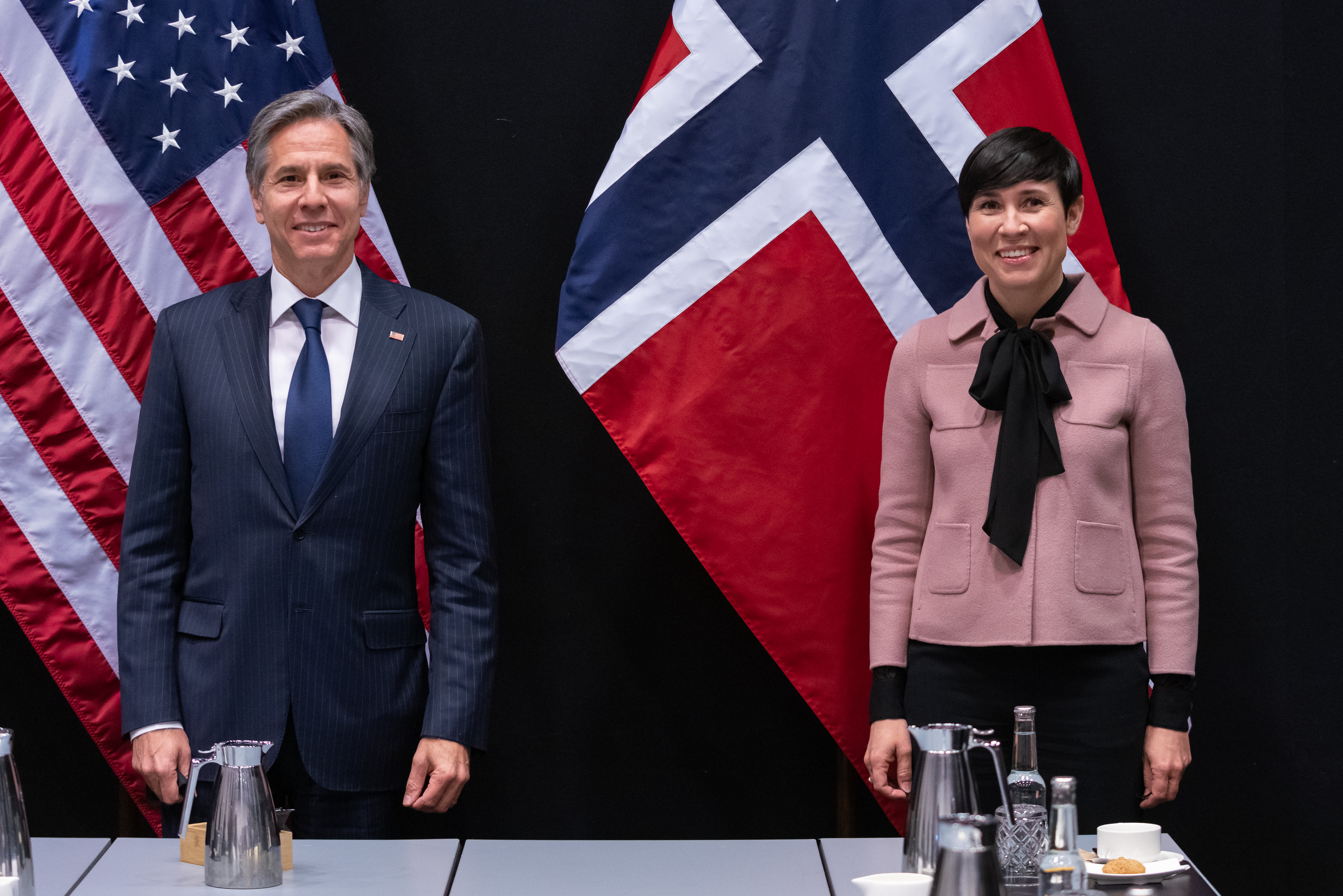
Søreide meets with U.S. Secretary of State Antony Blinken in Reykjavík, Iceland in May 2021.

==== 2018 ====
While Erna Solberg was on a summit to the White House to meet with U.S. president Donald Trump in January 2018, Søreide met with the Speaker of the House of Representatives Paul Ryan. She also met with then U. S Secretary of State Rex Tillerson, where she expressed worries about the U.S cutting aid to Palestinians. To the media, she expressed that the situation in the area was tense.

Following the poisoning of Sergei and Yulia Skripal in Salisbury on 4 March 2018, Søreide supported the condemnation issued by the leaders of Germany, France, the United Kingdom and the United States. She described the incident as shocking, dan added: "Any use of such nerve agent is prohibited under the Chemical Weapons Convention, and a violation of international law. This is completely unacceptable. Those behind it must be held accountable for this wrongdoing".

In May 2018, Søreide expressed concerns about instability in the Middle East following the United States's withdrawal from the Iran nuclear deal, saying in a statement to Aftenposten: "We are also concerned that this could lead to increased instability in an already troubled region, and that the consequences of the decision could have an impact on the international community's ability to prevent the proliferation of nuclear weapons".

Later in 2018, Søreide, participating in a government delegation to China with King Harald in the lead, prohibited the king from speaking on the situation of the Uyghur people, as he had stated to the press that he intended to do. This constraint on the king was likely prompted by fear of Chinese intimidation and threats against Norwegian trade, which Norway had encountered after the Nobel Peace Prize was awarded to the Dalai Lama of Tibet.

==== 2019 ====
In January 2019, Søreide expressed support for the Norwegian participation in the Libya conflict, and called the right call to make, but was critical to the lack of planning of the participation's aftermath. She also stated that: "enough wasn't done to stabilise Libya after the military participation".

In May, Søreide responded to a written question from Red Party leader Bjørnar Moxnes that was submitted on 26 April, regarding the possible extradition of WikiLeaks founder Julian Assange from the United Kingdom to the United States. In her answer, she said: "It is the responsibility of the British authorities and the judiciary to deal with questions about the extradition of Assange based on a specific extradition request. This is not something the Norwegian authorities can comment on". She emphasised that the protection of journalists, media workers, writers and human rights defenders is central to Norwegian human rights policy. Moxnes praised her acknowledgment of the United Kingdom's human rights obligations, but expressed disappointment that Søreide was unwilling to ensure that they did so.

At a press conference on 15 November, together with prime minister Erna Solberg, they both thanked Lithuania for their participation in the release of Frode Berg. Søreide confirmed that their efforts had gone to work with other countries as well before settling on Lithuania. She stated: "We discovered while working on the various tracks, that this was the most fruitful, and eventually that it was the only possible track". She went on to say: "It became clear that this exchange was a solution that all parties could accept".

==== 2020 ====
In January 2020, the Ministry of Foreign Affairs assisted in the return of a Norwegian woman and her two children from Syria. Søreide said the decision was made on humanitarian grounds, citing concerns about the health of one of the children. The woman had been charged by the Norwegian Police Security Service with participation in terrorist organisations. The decision was opposed by the Progress Party, which subsequently withdrew from the Solberg government.

In August, Søreide's spokeswoman, Trude Maaseide, said that an unnamed Russian diplomat working at the trade section of the Russian embassy in Oslo was expelled for linking to the case of a man jailed on the accusation of spying for Russia. It appeared the expelled diplomat was the Russian intelligence officer that Norwegian authorities said was meeting with the suspected spy (a Norwegian citizen) in an Oslo restaurant when he was arrested.

Søreide hailed the peace agreement between Israel and the United Arab Emirates as a positive development and said Norway welcomed any move that led toward peace in the Middle East.

Søreide supported the EU's condemnation and sanctions following the attempted poisoning of Kremlin critic Alexei Navalny, saying "Norway has condemned the attack on Alexei Navalny. Analyzes by the Organisation for the Prohibition of Chemical Weapons (OPCW) and independent tests in Germany, Sweden and France have confirmed that Navalny was poisoned with the military nerve agent Novichok". She further stressed that the incident was a violation of the Chemical Weapons Convention.

In September 2020, Søreide, announced that the Polish municipalities which introduced the LGBT-free zones would be denied the EEA and Norway Grants whose aim is the reduction of social and economic disparities in the European Economic Area (EEA). Poland is the biggest beneficiary of these funds and could potentially lose millions of euros of financial aid. The suspension of funds only applies to the government bodies that have themselves adopted resolutions and does not apply to non-governmental organizations that operate in the LGBT-free zones.

In November, Søreide defended the government's plan for the Sami people when the government presented its area report for the north. Her response came after 15 year old Sunna Svendsen criticised the government live by stating that the report's title wasn't inclusive enough for the Sami people. Søreide stated: "When we started working on the report, we saw very quickly that Sami questions must be consistent in it, instead of it being an isolated chapter". She further added that they had asked the Sami Parliament for inputs.

==== 2021 ====
In January 2021, following the Trump Administration's decision to list Cuba as a country that promotes terrorism, Søreide expressed criticism of the move and called it "regrettable". She also cited the peace negotiations in Colombia with the nation, and that "the American administration now made sure to put a toll on Cubans with the negotiators being unable to leave Cuba".

Søreide condemned the Myanmar coup d'état in February 2021, and called on the military to release the country's democratically elected leaders. She also stressed that the two sides needed to find a peaceful solution with respect and dialog for democratic principals and governance.

In April, Søreide called on the UN Security Council to consider economic sanctions and arms embargo against the coup makers in Myanmar.

Søreide met with U. S. Secretary of State Antony Blinken in May 2021 in Reykjavík, Iceland, to discuss the situation at the Gaza Strip. Following the meeting, Søreide explained that Blinken had stressed the expectation of a de-escalation and path to a cease fire. Søreide described it as "the only thing to prevent this from escalating out of control".

Following the passing of an anti-LGBT law in Hungary in June 2021, Søreide criticised the law, stating: "the law is one of the worst examples we have seen in recent times, and an example of the country continuing on the path away from the rule of law and democracy. Here, a prime minister and a government present a law that connects homosexuality with pedophilia, it is completely insane". She further expressed concern that multiple countries were heading in the wrong direction when it comes to LGBT rights, adding: "same-sex love is punishable in 69 countries, it also creates a climate of hatred and prejudice against gay and queer people".

In July, Søreide released a statement where she pointed to China for being responsible for a computer breach leaking emails at the Storting that occurred in March, saying: "After a thorough review of our intelligence information, it is our assessment that the very serious data breach against the Storting was carried out from China. Several of our allies, the EU and Microsoft have also confirmed this".

After the Taliban started to take back control of cities in Afghanistan, Søreide announced at a press conference in August 2021 that Norway would be temporarily closing its embassy in Kabul. She emphasised concerns over the growing violence in the country as a result of Taliban's increased activity.

At the end of August, U. S. Secretary of State Antony Blinken, via a statement, thanked Søreide and Norwegian health personal at the field hospital who treated 50 victims of a terror attack at the Kabul Airport on 26 August; for their effort.

A week before the 2021 election, Søreide expressed concerns about the country's relation with NATO and the EU should the Red Party gain influence to affect a possible red-green government. Labour leader Jonas Gahr Støre rebuffed her concerns and specified that: "for the Labour Party to head a government, EEA and NATO relations and responsible economic control has to be the basis".

Søreide joined prime minister Erna Solberg at the UN summit in September. Søreide said she expected U.S. president Joe Biden to focus on domestic issues and put America first because of the COVID-19 pandemic, while still showing his dedication to international cooperation.

In early October, Søreide expressed concerns following Ethiopia's declaration of persona non grata against seven UN humanitarian workers. She also expressed worry for the consequences if the Ethiopian government continued to limit dialog, aid and cooperation with the international community.

On 14 October, she was succeeded by Anniken Huitfeldt after the Solberg government was defeated at the previous month's election.

== Storting committees ==
- 2021–present: Chair of the Standing Committee on Foreign Affairs and Defence
- 2009–2013: Chair of the Standing Committee on Foreign Affairs and Defence
- 2005–2009: Chair of the Standing Committee on Education, Research and Church Affairs
- 2001–2005: member of the Standing Committee on Education, Research and Church Affairs

== Personal life ==
Søreide was born on 2 May 1976, a daughter of electrician Egil Eriksen and secretary Wenche Irene Hansen. She has two sisters.

She married Øystein Eriksen Søreide in 2006. They did not have any children together. The couple have been separated at least since she still served in Erna Solberg's government.

She later confirmed she was in a relationship with Gunnar Børte, a defence industry senior manager.

== Other activities ==
- International Crisis Group (ICG), Member of the Board of Trustees (since 2023)
- Munich Security Conference, Member of the Advisory Council (since 2023)
- Centre for Humanitarian Dialogue, Member of the Board

Political offices
New title	Chair of the Standing Committee on Foreign Affairs and Defence; 2009–2013	Succeeded by Anniken Huitfeldt
Preceded by Anne-Grete Strøm-Erichsen	Minister of Defence; 2013–2017	Succeeded by Frank Bakke-Jensen
Preceded by Børge Brende	Minister of Foreign Affairs; 2017–2021	Succeeded by Anniken Huitfeldt
Preceded by Anniken Huitfeldt	Chair of the Standing Committee on Foreign Affairs and Defence; 2021–2026	Succeeded by Peter Christian Frølich
