= Gorm Kjernli =

Norwegian politician

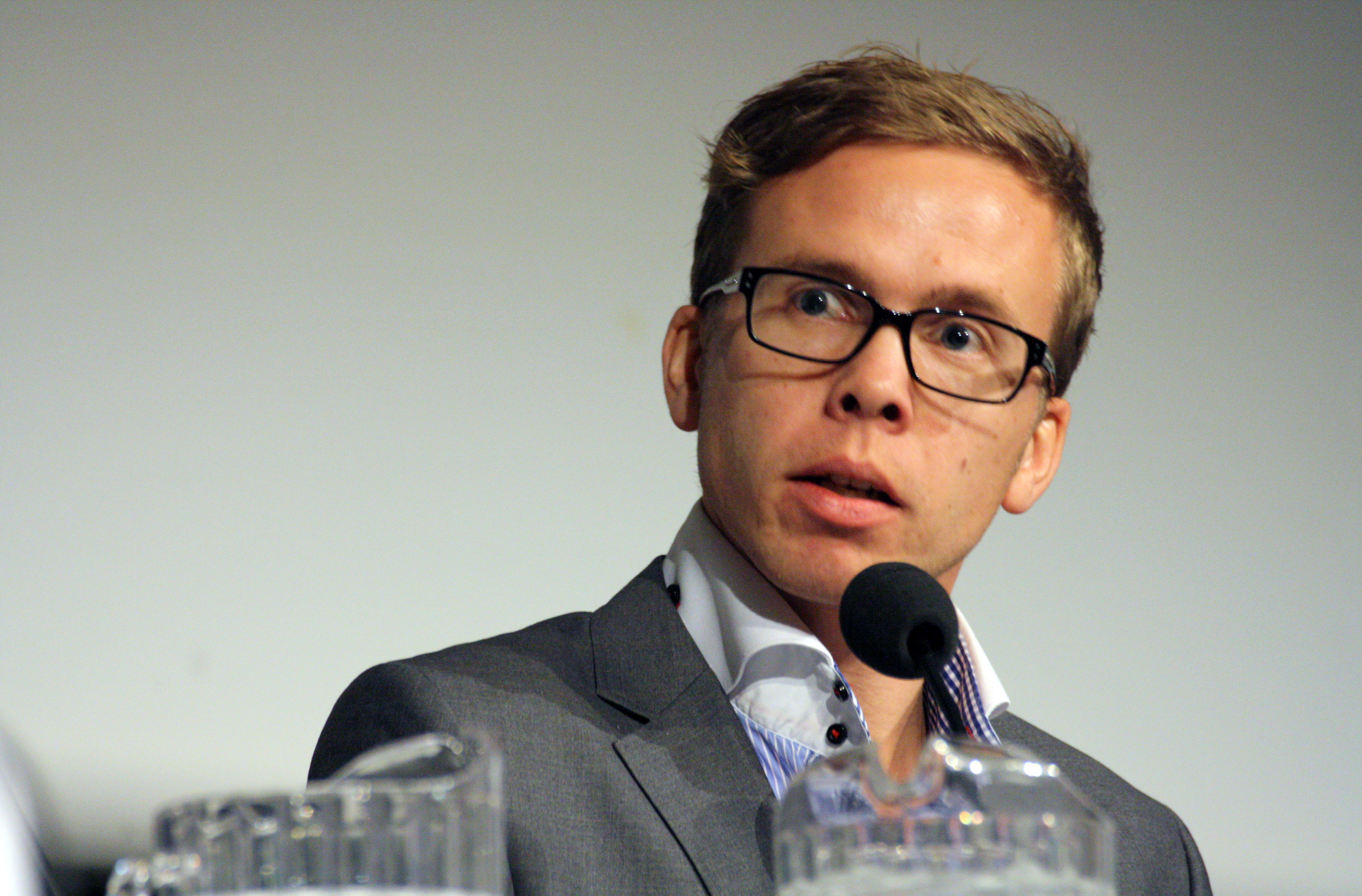

Gorm Kjernli (born 31 December 1981) is a Norwegian politician for the Labour Party.

He served in the position of deputy representative to the Norwegian Parliament from Akershus during the term 2005–2009. Halfway through this term he was promoted to a regular representative as Anniken Huitfeldt was appointed to the second cabinet Stoltenberg.

Kjernli was a member of Ski municipality council from 2003.

He hails from Kråkstad and is a political science student at the University of Oslo.
