= Veidekke Industry =

Veidekke Industry AS
- Company type: Public
- Industry: Asphalt
- Founded: 1910
- Headquarters: Oslo, Norway
- Key people: Øyvind Moen(Man.Dir)
- Products: Asphalt, Aggregates, Dams
- Revenue: NOK 3 193 million (2012)
- Number of employees: 947 (2012)
- Parent: Veidekke Group
- Website: Norwegian website

Veidekke Industry, a subsidiary of Veidekke Group is involved in asphalt/aggregate operations and public road maintenance in Norway.

== Operations ==
Veidekke Industry is Norway's largest private operator in the asphalt market. The company produced 1,9 million tons of asphalt in 2012, out of a total production volume in Norway of approximately 5,3 million tons. The company is also one of the largest producers of gravel and crushed stone, as well as being maintenance operators of public roads.

Veidekke Industry is one of a few companies with worldwide expertise in asphalt core construction. The advantage of Asphaltic Concrete Cores for Embankment dams, is its cost effective waterproofing capabilities and its reliability in various climatic conditions.

In 1995, Veidekke Industry and Shell joined forces to work on a difficult challenge: The development of a process for making asphalt at lower temperatures without sacrificing the quality of the product. Five years later the venture reached its goal with the WAM Foam process, Warm Asphalt Mix, based on Veidekke Industry’s foam bitumen technology.

== History ==
Veidekke Industry was formed in 1999, but its history goes back to 1910 when AS Sigurd Hesselberg began making asphalt concrete and later became Norway's first maker of asphalt for roads. When Sigurd Hesselberg died in 1929, Bjarne L. Corwin makes the company become Norway's largest private asphalt entrepreneur. In 1964 Bjarne L Corwin's son, Paul Corwin becomes the company's new leader and by then AS Sigurd Hesselberg is the dominant company in the Norwegian asphalt industry.

In 1950, Arne W. Korsbrekke and Fritz Lorck, both former employees of Bjarne L Corwin, founded Korsbrekke og Lorck AS (KOLO). The company is well equipped and gets contracts for Ørlandet and Andøya airport. The company runs its business independently, but in close relations with AS Veidekke from the start of the 1960s.

In 1988 AS Sigurd Hesselberg, sells its main division Hesselberg Vei to AS Veidekke. By now, Korsbrekke og Lorck is partially owned by AS Veidekke. A new company is formed, Veidekke Asfalt. Together with Korsbrekke og Lorck AS, Veidekke Asfalt now has the hegemony in the industry.

In 1999 Veidekke Asfalt and Korsbrekke og Lorck AS joins into a merger and becomes Kolo Veidekke AS. Vidar Aarvold leads the company until 2009, then Per-Johan Plünnecke takes over as Managing Director. From 2012 Øyvind Moen leads the company.
