= Ragnhild Male Hartviksen =

Norwegian politician

- Born: 15 July 1976 (age 50)
- Education: University of Oslo
- Occupation: Politician
- Employer: Municipality of Drammen
- Political party: Labour Party
- Parent(s): Terje Hartviksen and Jorid Male

Ragnhild Male Hartviksen (born 15 July 1976) is a Norwegian politician.

She was elected deputy representative to the Storting from the constituency of Akershus for the period 2021–2025, for the Labour Party. She replaced Anniken Huitfeldt in the Storting from 2021 while Huitfeldt is government minister.

Hartviksen hails from Spikkestad, and has been member of the municipal council of Asker since 2019. She is educated from the University of Oslo, and has worked for the municipality of Drammen.
