= European Committee (Parliament of Norway) =

Special committee of the Norwegian Parliament

The European Committee (Norwegian: Europautvalget), formerly known as the EEA Committee (Norwegian: EØS-utvalget) is a special committee of the Parliament of Norway. It discusses important issues regarding the European Union (EU), the European Economic Area (EEA) and the European Free Trade Area (EFTA) with the government. In particular, the committee is responsible for processing directives of the European Union to be implemented as part of the EEA Agreement. The committee also discusses issues related to the EEA Agreement, the EEA law and court cases with the EU and the EFTA Surveillance Authority.

The committee consists of members of the Standing Committee on Foreign Affairs and Defence, the members of the parliamentary delegation to EFTA and EEA, and the members of the standing committees responsible for the issues at hand. The Minister of Foreign Affairs always participates at the meets, as does any other ministers if their portfolio is being discussed.
