= Enlarged Committee on Foreign Affairs and Defence =

The Enlarged Committee on Foreign Affairs and Defence is a special committee of the Parliament of Norway. It holds non-disclosed discussions with the government regarding important issues of foreign affairs, trade policy and security issues. Other issues are discussed in the Standing Committee on Foreign Affairs and Defence. The enlarged committee consists of the members of the Standing Committee on Foreign Affairs and Defence, the parliamentary leaders and the president.

Prior to 2009, the committee was called the Enlarged Committee on Foreign Affairs and consisted of both the members of the now defunct Standing Committee on Foreign Affairs and the defunct Standing Committee on Defence.
