= Barents Region =

Coordinates: 65°N 44°E

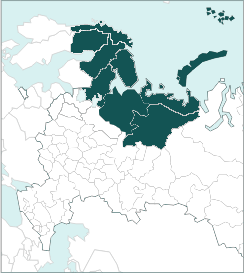

Population (2012)
  - Total: 5 206 000
  - Density: 2.9/km^{2} (7.5/sq mi)

The Barents Region is a name given, by advocates of establishing international cooperation after the fall of the Soviet Union, to the land along the coast of the Barents Sea, from Nordland county in Norway to the Kola Peninsula in Russia and beyond all the way to the Ural Mountains and Novaya Zemlya, and south to the Gulf of Bothnia of the Baltic Sea and the great lakes Ladoga and Onega. Among the projects is the Barents Road from Bodø in Norway through Haparanda in Sweden and Finland to Murmansk in Russia. The region has six million inhabitants on 1.75 million km^{2}; three quarters of both belong to Russia.

The regional cooperation was formally opened on 11 January 1993, initiated by Norway under foreign minister Thorvald Stoltenberg. It includes Nordland, Troms, and Finnmark counties in Norway; Västerbotten County and Norrbotten County in Sweden; Lapland region, Northern Ostrobothnia, Kainuu, and North Karelia in Finland; and Murmansk Oblast, Arkhangelsk Oblast, Komi Republic, Republic of Karelia, and Nenets Autonomous Okrug in Russia. The four countries take turns at chairing the cooperation. Norway's participation is coordinated from the Norwegian Barents Secretariat in Kirkenes. Sweden's and Finland's participation is administrated from the county administrations in Umeå (Västerbotten) and Rovaniemi (Lapland). In January 2008 there was established an International Barents Secretariat which is to provide technical support for the multilateral coordinated activities within the framework of the Barents Euro-Arctic Council and the Barents Regional Council. This Secretariat is located in Kirkenes in the same building as the Norwegian Barents Secretariat.

== Barents Regional Cooperation ==
The Barents cooperation area is 1,750,000 square kilometres (680,000 sq mi), and the population numbers 5.3 million inhabitants.

The Barents Regional Council (BRC) is a forum for the Barents regional cooperation, with the aim to promote the use of the local regional knowledge through which the BRC participants can find a common ground on which they can base their cooperation, cross-border projects and programmes on. The Regional Committee (RC) is responsible for preparing the meetings of the Regional Council and for implementing the decisions taken by the Regional Council.

The Barents Regional Council (BRC) consists of 13 member counties / regions / indigenous peoples in Finland, Norway, Russia and Sweden.

- Finland: Oulu Region, Lapland, Kainuu and North Karelia
- Norway: Troms, Finnmark, Nordland.
- Russia: Arkhangelsk, Karelia, Komi, Murmansk and Nenets.
- Sweden: Norrbotten County and Västerbotten County

The indigenous peoples of the Sami, Nenets and Veps also have their own representatives at the regional cooperation. The Chairmanship of the Regional Committee is held by the same county as that of the Regional Council, and consequently alternates every second year. The chairmanship 2017 – 2019 is in Finnmark, Norway.

The previous four chairmanships were as follows:

- Kainuu region in Finland 2015–2017
- Arkhangelsk region of Russia 2013–2015
- Norrbotten County of Sweden in 2011–2013
- Troms, Norway in 2009–2011

=== Barents Region – Seven principles ===
BRC has formulated a vision of the seven principles and goals in the regional cooperation.

- First principle is that the well-being of the regions inhabitants should be the basis for all the actions that are carried through the Barents regional cooperation.
- Second principle calls out for the improvement of the cooperation between the people involved. This should not be depended on the hierarchy or the level of the person in neither his / her own organisation nor in the BRC cooperation.
- Third principle notes that the capable and able actor's on the regional and national spheres should cooperate towards common goals. This enables the betterment of the procedures at the border crossing in both on the individual and imported / exported goods level.
- Fourth principle demands the preservation of the local culture, unique customs and lifestyles of each areas respective indigenous people. Helping to create connections and commitments amongst the indigenous people is of great importance.
- Fifth principle acknowledges the political capital that the Barents Regional Council has and for this reason it is desirable that council uses this resource to better advocate the Barents region.
- Sixth, the second last principle notes that the regional authorities who take part in the activities of BRC should better take in to count regional development in their individual regions in the areas of economic, social and environmental development. The BRC also calls out for these actors to emphasize the sustainability in these development actions.
- Seventh and the last principle recommends that the BRC cooperation should be an example of how the cooperation can be both successful and peaceful and how these practices can work as a framework for others to take inspiration from.

=== The Barents Programme of 2014 - 2018 ===
The basis of the prioritized areas Barents Programme of 2014 – 2018 can be found from the guiding principles of the BRC. The themes for the 2014 – 2018 are economy, environment, education and research, mobility and culture.

Economic growth and the essentiality of it are the key factors for the regional development in the region of Barents. The programme acknowledges the meaning of the small and medium-sized companies. The cooperation between the larger companies and the research institutions play a key factor in the regional economics. This development happens especially towards the international market if the companies have innovative services and products to offer.

Education and research play a key part in the economic growth but they are an important factor if the Barents region is to build up a sufficient base for innovation and information work. The 2014 – 2018 programme sees that the cooperation between the institutions of higher education and research and the public and private sector is of great importance.

The large size of the Barents region and the remoteness of the population centers have their own challenges. A good transportation network, innovative and vigorous economy are called out to meet tackle these problems. Currently challenges are the inter-communal transportation and mobility and the lack of extensive transportation network between the cross-border actors. This is apparent with the infrastructure and transportation related problems in the east-west border.

In short, aims for the 2014 - 2018 development programme are as follows:

- Promote the growth of creative and fast growing businesses in the region and increase the cooperation between cross border regions in the areas of economy and quality of life. Joint management and the natural resources and preservations are key to the sustainable development. The sustainability also calls in to take account the climate change and how the Barents regions will adapt to it.
- The lack of good cross border transportation network demands more from the cooperative parties. This raises the mobility across the borders in every sector from studying, to private and leisure travel and tourism. The convergence of the cooperative network also demands that each participant understands one others culture and the background they come from.

Structure of the Barents Regional Council and other significant regional actors in the Arctic region Barents Regional council works in an area where there are many other interest driving actors. These are the Barents Euro-Arctic Cooperation, The European Union, Northern Dimension, Arctic Council and Nordic Council of Ministers.

Barents Regional Council and the Barents Euro-Arctic Council (BEAC) share few common organs between each other. These include the International Barents Secretariat (IBS) and a Working Group of the Indigenous Peoples (WGIP) and lastly the Joint committee on Rescue Cooperation.

Both the BEAC and BRC have they own organs under their cooperative organisations. BRC has Barents Regional Committee (RC) and three main working groups (WG) that are WG of environment, transportation & logistics and lastly WG of Investment and Economic Cooperation.

BEAC has their own Committee of Senior Officials (CSO) and under this there are several working groups and other organs. These are the WG of Economic Cooperation, Environment, Customs Cooperation, Barents Forest Sector Task-Force and the streeting committee for the Barents Euro-Arctic Pan-European Transport Area.

Between the BRC and BEAC there are several joint working groups (JWG) in their own expertise fields. These are JWG on Health and related Social Issues, JWG on Education and Research, JWG on Energy, JWG on Culture, JWG on Tourism and lastly JWG on Youth.

== See also ==
- Sápmi
- Pomors
- Northern Dimension
- Northeast Passage
- Northern Sea Route
- Circumpolar arctic
- North Calotte
