= Northern Dimension =

International policy

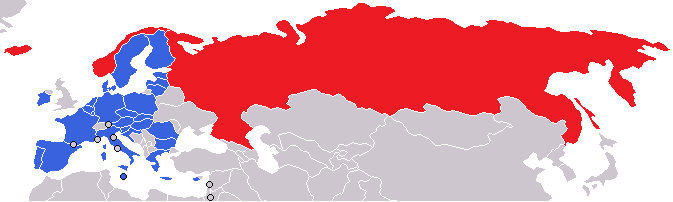
- Member states of the European Union Non-EU partners of the Northern Dimension
- Formation: 1999; 27 years ago
- Type: Policy
- Location: Europe, Arctic
- Members: European Union; Iceland; Norway; Russia
- Website: Website

The Northern Dimension (ND) was a joint policy between four equal partners — the European Union, Iceland, Norway, and Russia — regarding the cross-border and external policies geographically covering Northwest Russia, the Baltic Sea and the Arctic regions, including the Barents Region. The ND Policy was initiated in 1999 and renewed in 2006. The Northern Dimension addresses the specific challenges and opportunities arising in those regions and aims to strengthen dialogue and cooperation between the EU and its member states, the northern countries associated with the EU under the European Economic Area (Norway and Iceland) and Russia. A particular emphasis is placed on subsidiarity, and on ensuring the active participation of all stakeholders in the North, including regional organizations, local and regional authorities, the academic and business communities, and civil society. On 24 September 2025, the EU, Iceland, and Norway decided to terminate Northern Dimension cooperation with Russia after having suspended it in 2022 after Russia’s invasion of Ukraine.

== Key priority themes ==
Several key priority themes for dialogue and co-operation under the Northern Dimension have been identified:

- Economy, business and infrastructure
- Human resources, education, culture, scientific research, and health
- The environment, nuclear safety, and natural resources
- Cross-border cooperation and regional development
- Justice and home affairs

== Partnerships ==
The working method for cooperation within the Northern Dimension is the partnerships model. ND cooperation takes place within four partnerships:

1. Northern Dimension Environmental Partnership (NDEP)
2. Northern Dimension Partnership in Public Health and Social Well-being (NDPHS)
3. Northern Dimension Partnership on Transport and Logistics (NDPTL) and
4. Northern Dimension Partnership on Culture (NDPC).

Other kinds of activities are pursued through the Northern Dimension Institute (NDI) and the Northern Dimension Business Council (NDBC). From the beginning of 2019, the Northern Dimension Institute led by the Aalto University's Center for markets in Transition (CEMAT) is leading an EC co-funded NDI Think Tank Action.

== Objectives ==
The Northern Dimension is intended to promote security and stability in the region, as well as helping build a safe, clean, and accessible environment for all people in the north. It aims at addressing the special regional development challenges of northern Europe. These include cold climatic conditions, long distances, wide disparities in standards of living, environmental challenges including problems with nuclear waste and wastewater management, and insufficient transport and border crossing facilities. The Northern Dimension is also intended to take advantage of the rich potential of the region, for example in terms of natural resources, economic dynamism, and a rich cultural heritage.

Besides, the Northern Dimension also has the objectives of addressing the challenges arising from uneven regional development, and helping avoid the emergence of new dividing lines in Europe following EU enlargement.

With the enlargement of the Union on 1 May 2004 to include Estonia, Latvia, Lithuania, and Poland, the importance of the Northern Dimension has increased considerably: eight EU Member States (Denmark, Germany, Poland, Lithuania, Latvia, Estonia, Finland, and Sweden) surround the Baltic Sea, and the EU's shared border with Russia has lengthened.

== History ==
Recent years have seen far-reaching changes in the geopolitical map of northern Europe. The Baltic States regained their independence in 1991. Finland and Sweden joined the EU in 1995, and Estonia, Latvia, Lithuania, and Poland in 2004. These events greatly increased the Northern and Baltic "presence" of the EU, and substantially lengthened the common border shared by the EU and the Russian Federation. It was imperative to address constructively the new challenges and opportunities which these changes created.

The Northern Dimension as an important topic for EU policy was first recognized at the Luxembourg European Council in December 1997. In the years which followed, the concept became more concrete. The Vienna European Council in December 1998 adopted a Commission Communication on a Northern Dimension for the policies of the Union. Six months later, in Cologne, the European Council adopted Guidelines for the Implementation of the Northern Dimension. In November 1999, the Finnish EU Presidency held a Ministerial Conference on the Northern Dimension, where an Inventory of current activities under the Northern Dimension was adopted. The Helsinki European Council in December 1999 invited the commission to prepare a Northern Dimension Action Plan, and the Feira European Council in June 2000 subsequently adopted this first Action Plan for the Northern Dimension in the external and cross-border policies of the European Union, 2001-2003.

Also a new dimension of this complex relationship is emerging with the melting of the Arctic because of climate change. Melting of sea ice leads to newly accessible natural resources which could cause power struggle.

As of 2025, the Northern Dimension is effectively defunct as a result of Russia's war of aggression against Ukraine.

== See also ==
- Association Trio
- Eastern Partnership
- European Union Customs Union
- Free trade agreements of the European Union
- Potential enlargement of the European Union
- Iceland–European Union relations
- Norway–European Union relations
- Russia–European Union relations
