= Veidekke =

Norwegian construction company

Veidekke Group ASA
- Company type: Allmennaksjeselskap
- Traded as: OSE: VEI
- Industry: Construction and Civil Engineering
- Founded: 1936
- Headquarters: Oslo, Norway
- Key people: Arne Giske (CEO); Martin Mæland (Chairman)
- Revenue: ▲NOK 30 billion (2016)
- Operating income: NOK 1460 million (2016)
- Number of employees: 8,577 (2019)
- Subsidiaries: Veidekke Sverige AB, Hoffmann A/S, Veidekke Entreprenør AS, Veidekke Eiendom AS, Veidekke industry AS
- Website: Corporate IR website

Veidekke (OSE: VEI) is the largest Norwegian construction and civil engineering company and the fourth largest in Scandinavia. Veidekke's business involves a network of Scandinavia construction and engineering operations, rehabilitation work, major heavy construction contracts and development of dwellings for the company's own account as well as buildings for public use. They recently acquired Reinertsen's civil engineering arm. Other business segments are asphalt operations, production of crushed stone and gravel (aggregates) and maintenance of public roads.

== Operations ==
Veidekke's core activities are linked with construction, property development, civil engineering and consulting, and industrial operations (asphalt/aggregates and road maintenance. Veidekke has developed in concrete, carpentry and road operations.

=== Engineering ===
Veidekke took control of 80% of the shares of civil engineering contractor Tore Løkke AS in Åfjord at Fosen in Sør-Trøndelag. They also acquired Reinertsen's onshore construction and civil engineering operations.

=== Construction ===
Veidekke is a major player in the Scandinavian construction market and undertakes all types of building and heavy construction projects. Veidekke's contracts include construction of residential and non-residential buildings, schools and other public buildings and renovation of buildings in addition to heavy construction projects such as roads, railways and industrial development projects.

Construction operations in Norway are the responsibility of Veidekke Entreprenør AS. In Denmark, Veidekke's construction operations are looked after by Hoffmann A/S, and in Sweden, construction operations are undertaken by Veidekke Sverige AB.

=== Property development ===
The property division, Veidekke Eiendom AS, undertakes the development of dwellings for Veidekke's own account. Another business segment is the development of non-residential buildings and special-purpose buildings for the public sector. The division also carries out maintenance and management of non-residential buildings on behalf of Veidekke and other clients.

=== Industry ===
The industry division's operations are concentrated to the Norwegian market and cover the following business areas: Asphalt/aggregates, civil engineering and consulting. and road maintenance. Asphalt/aggregate operations are managed by Veidekke Industry AS. This segment includes production of asphalt and asphalting work, production of gravel and crushed stone, as well as maintenance of public roads.

== History ==
Veidekke's roots go back to 1863 in Denmark (H. Hoffmann & Sønner) and in 1896 in Norway (Høyer Ellefsen). As a company, Veidekke was founded 6 February 1936 by Nico S. Beer and Gustav Piene. In its founding years, Veidekke was a company constructing roads and laying cobblestone. When the Second World War broke out in 1940, the company fulfilled all signed contracts and shut down all operations until after the war.

In 1948, the small and virtually unknown company, Veidekke, won the contract for construction of runways at Stavanger Airport, Sola. This was the first of a number of major airport contracts for Veidekke.

In the middle of the 1950s, Veidekke was engaged in airport construction in Ethiopia. This was a very important contract for the future development of the company. In the 1960s the company's main activity was road construction. From 1969 until the beginning of the 1980s, Veidekke was once again active in Africa, this time performing various contracts for NORAD (the Norwegian Agency for Development Cooperation). The beginning of the 1970s was also the beginning of a new period for Veidekke. The company needed to focus on new product areas.

In 1972, Veidekke was awarded the contract for construction of the Heggmoen Dam in Northern Norway, and what followed for Veidekke, was a period of nationwide dam construction.

At the beginning of the 1980s, a structural development of the building and construction industry started in Norway. This resulted in the amalgamation of many companies into a few major players. Veidekke, however, decided on a different course, choosing instead to develop itself into a nationwide contracting company. Consequently, through take-overs, mergers and establishment of new companies, more than 60 companies have become part of Veidekke. Veidekke has grown from being the ninth largest construction company at the beginning of the 1980s to its present position as the largest Norwegian owned construction company.

On June 23, 1986 Veidekke was quoted on the Oslo Stock Exchange's main list. Since the end of the 1960s Veidekke's employees have owned shares in the company, and Veidekke still encourages its employees to buy shares through well renowned share programs.

== See also ==
- New National Opera House
- Holmenkollbakken
