= Nils-Ole Foshaug =

Norwegian politician

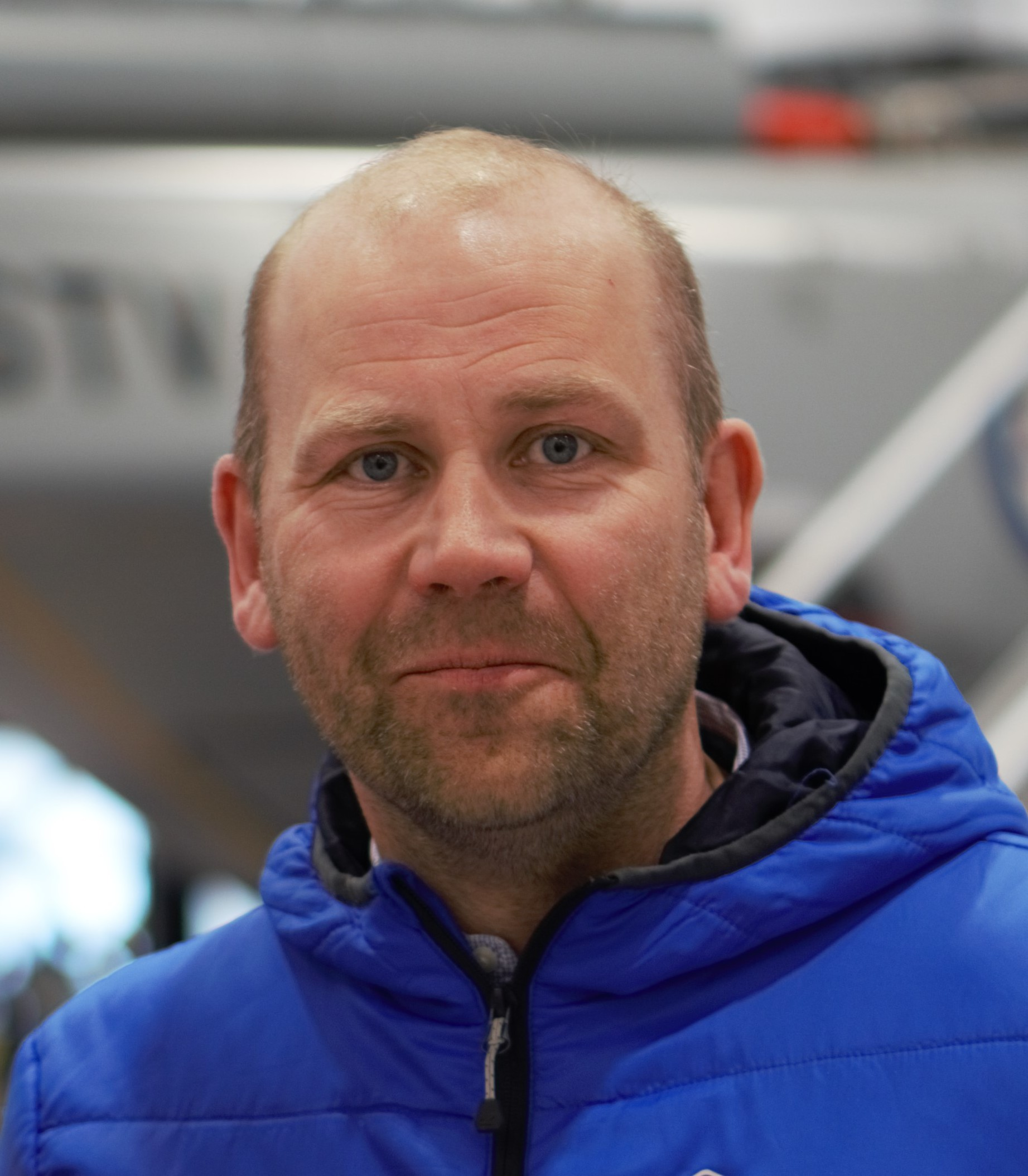
- Nils-Ole Foshaug
- Born: 22 November 1970 (age 55)
- Education: Tromsø University College
- Occupation: Politician
- Political party: Labour Party
- Relatives: Meyer Foshaug

Nils-Ole Foshaug (born 22 November 1970) is a Norwegian politician for the Labour Party. He has been a member of the Storting since 2021.

== Career ==
Born on 22 November 1970, Foshaug hails from Bardufoss, and was educated at the Tromsø University College. He is a great-grandson of politician Meyer Foshaug.

A member of the Målselv municipal council from 2003, he was mayor of Målselv from 2015 to 2019.

He was elected representative to the Storting from the constituency of Troms for the period 2021–2025. He was deputy representative to the Storting 2017–2021.
