= 1967 in Norway =

- Centuries: 18th; 19th; 20th; 21st
- Decades: 1940s; 1950s; 1960s; 1970s; 1980s
- See also: List of years in Norway

The following events occurred in Norway in the year 1967.

== Incumbents ==
- Monarch – Olav V.
- Prime Minister – Per Borten (Centre Party)

== Events ==
- 1 January – The Norwegian National Insurance Act (Folketrygdloven) was introduced.
- 22 October – The opening of the Tjeldsund Bridge.
- September 22 – The first major electoral test for the four-party bourgeois coalition government.
- 24 November – The voting age in Norway was set to 20 years of age.
- Municipal and county elections are held throughout the country.
- The Government Pension Fund of Norway (Norwegian: Statens pensjonsfond Norge or SPN) was established by the Norwegian National Insurance Act (Folketrygdloven)
- Natur og Ungdom is established.

=== Sports ===
- 11 to 12 February – The World Allround Speed Skating Championships for Men are held in Oslo.
- Walter Presch coaches the Norwegian football team.

=== Literature ===
- Per Hansson, journalist and writer, is awarded the Gyldendal's Endowment literature prize.
- Hallvard Rieber-Mohn, writer and Dominican priest, is awarded the Riksmål Society Literature Prize.
- Astrid Tollefsen, poet, is awarded the Norwegian Critics Prize for Literature for the poetry collection Hendelser.
- Johan Borgen is awarded the Nordic Council Literature Prize, for the short story collection Nye noveller.

== Notable births ==
=== January ===
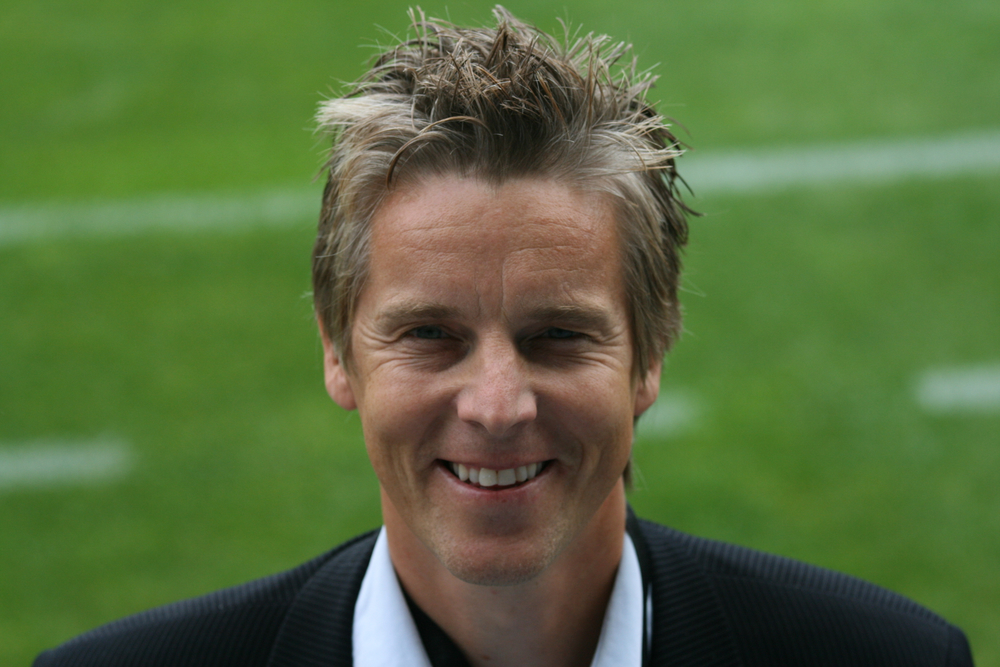
Jan Åge Fjørtoft

- 1 January – Trude Brænne Larssen, novelist
- 5 January – Kjetil Skogrand, historian and politician.
- 10 January – Jan Åge Fjørtoft, footballer.
- 12 January (in Sweden) – Vendela Kirsebom, model and actress
- 12 January – Stig Kleven, sport wrestler.
- 14 January (in Sweden) – Rolf Gupta, composer and conductor.
- 20 January – Ivar Bern, chess player
- 21 January – Geir Waage, politician
- 28 January – Dag-Eilev Fagermo, footballer
- 30 January – Pål Christian Roland, health administrator and politician.

=== February ===
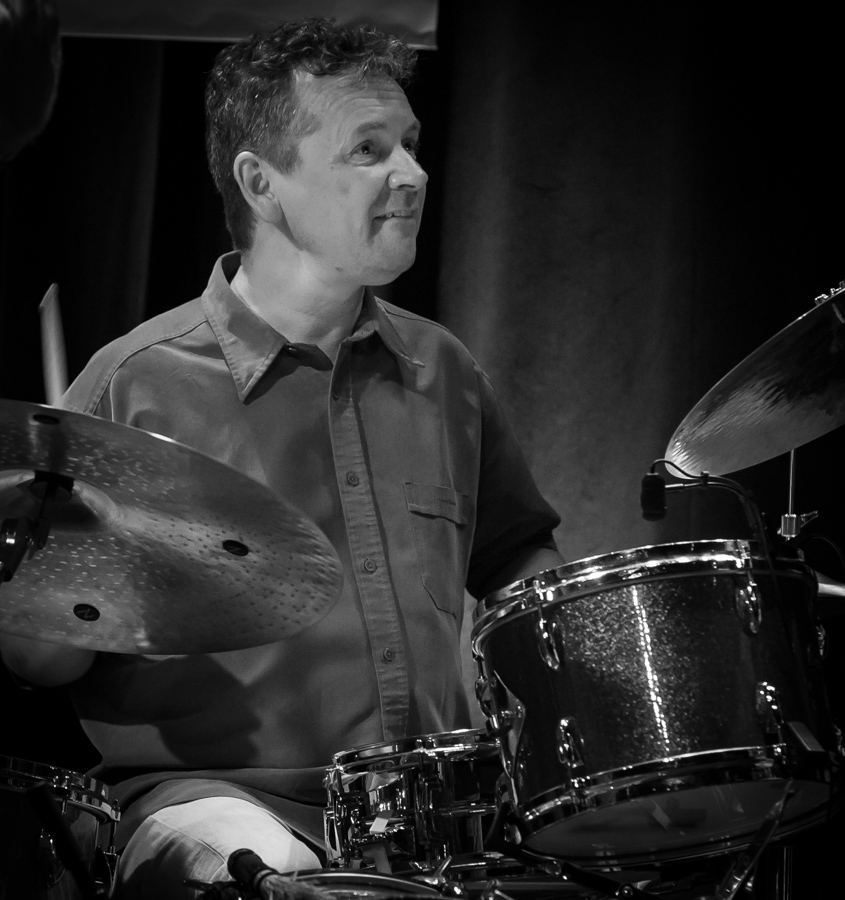
Stein Inge Brækhus

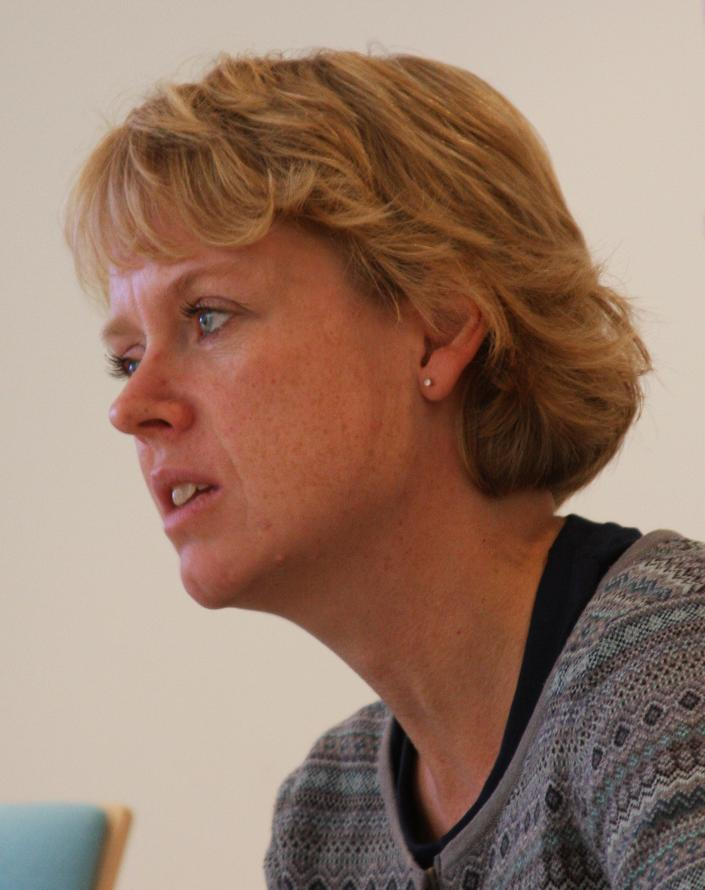
Marianne Aasen

- 1 February
  - John Hegre, guitarist, songwriter and sound engineer
  - Kjetil Storesletten, economist
- 3 February
  - Gisle Kverndokk, composer.
  - Børge Petersen-Øverleir, guitarist
- 4 February – Trond-Arne Bredesen, Nordic combined skier.
- 8 February
  - Kent Bergersen, footballer
  - Lise Davidsen, soprano.
- 11 February – Kari Sofie Bjørnsen, politician.
- 12 February – Stein Inge Brækhus, jazz musician.
- 15 February – Trond Egil Soltvedt, footballer
- 16 February – Hanne Hogness, handball player.
- 18 February – Nina Sandberg, politician.
- 21 February – Marianne Aasen, politician.
- 22 February – Audun Erlien, jazz musician
- 26 February – Audun Skorgen, jazz musician

=== March ===
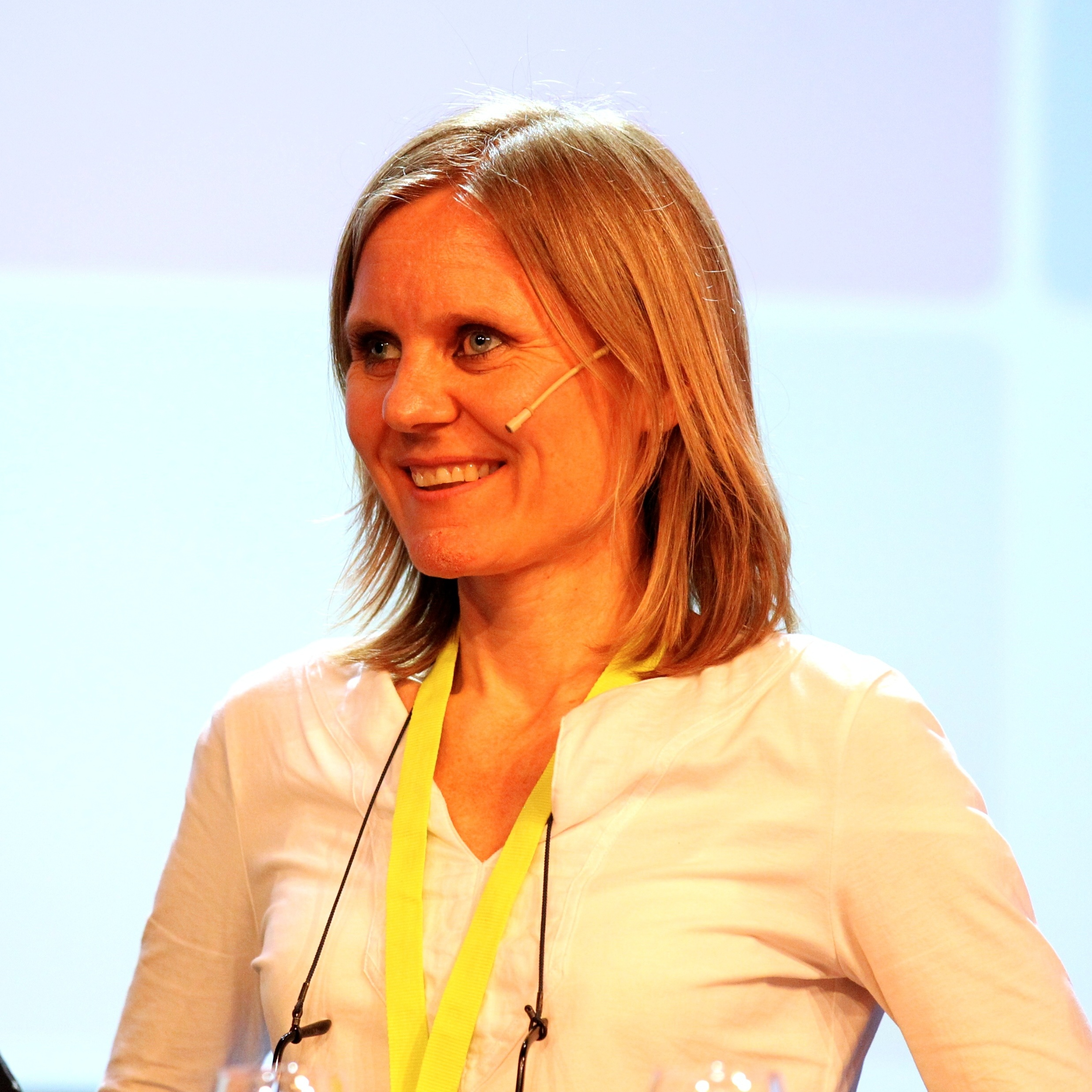
Helje Solberg

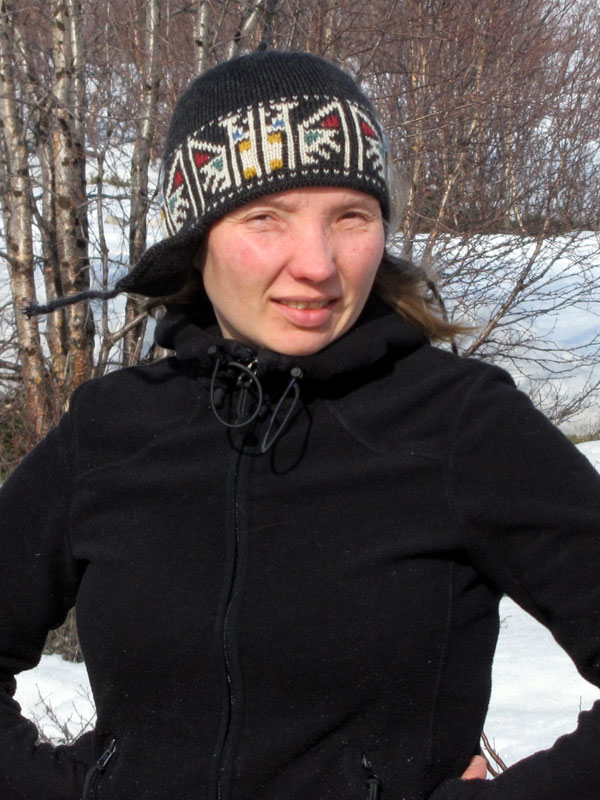
Siri Broch Johansen

- 7 March
  - Helje Solberg, journalist.
  - Knut Yrvin, software developer
- 9 March
  - Siri Broch Johansen, Sami author, singer, and textbook writer.
  - Per Espen Stoknes, politician.
- 11 March
  - Ole Einar Martinsen, footballer
  - Liv Gustavsen, politician.
  - Håkon Storm-Mathisen, jazz musician
- 13 March – Tone-Helen Toften, politician.
- 18 March – Kjetil Bjørklund, politician.
- 19 March – Frode Scheie, handball player.
- 22 March – Brage Sandmoen, football referee
- 27 March – Sølvi Olsen Meinseth, athlete.
- 31 March – Ivar Kolve, jazz musician

=== April ===
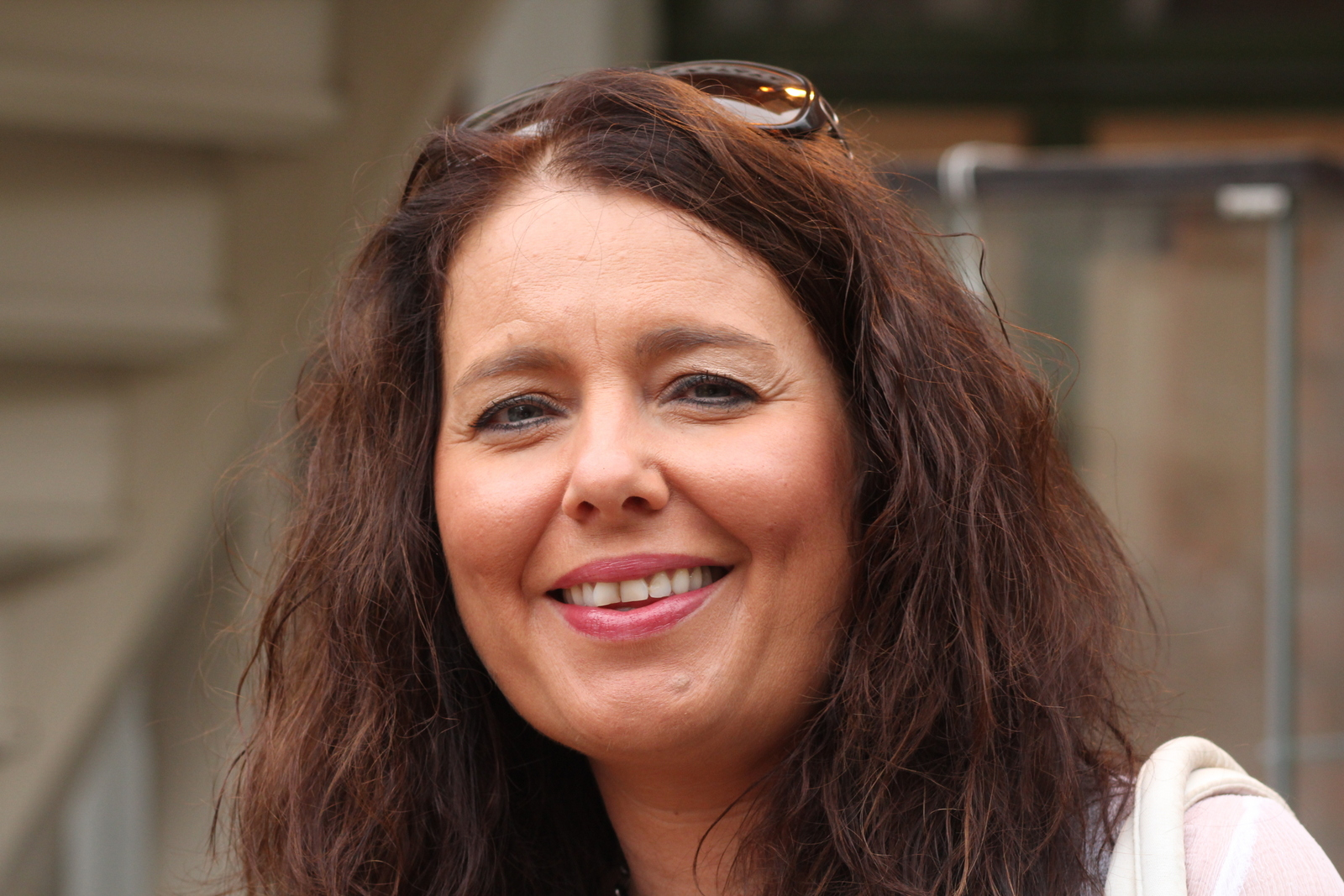
Margit Bakken

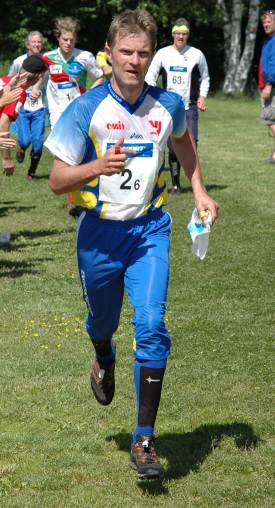
Bjørnar Valstad

- 3 April – Berit Digre, handball player.
- 4 April – Siv Mossleth, politician.
- 5 April – Erland Johnsen, footballer
- 6 April – Eirin Kristin Sund, politician.
- 8 April – Margit Bakken, musician
- 14 April – Frode Unneland, musician
- 17 April – Kenneth Blom, painter (born in Denmark).
- 19 April
  - Bodil Arnesen, operatic soprano.
  - Tine Sundtoft, civil servant and politician.
- 20 April – Frode Thomassen, footballer
- 21 April – Knut Erling Granaas, sledge hockey goaltender
- 24 April – Magnus Grønneberg, singer
- 26 April – Alf Kåre Tveit, footballer
- 27 April
  - Dag Stokke, musician (d. 2011)
  - Hege Stendahl, cyclist.
  - Bjørnar Valstad, orienteering competitor

=== May ===
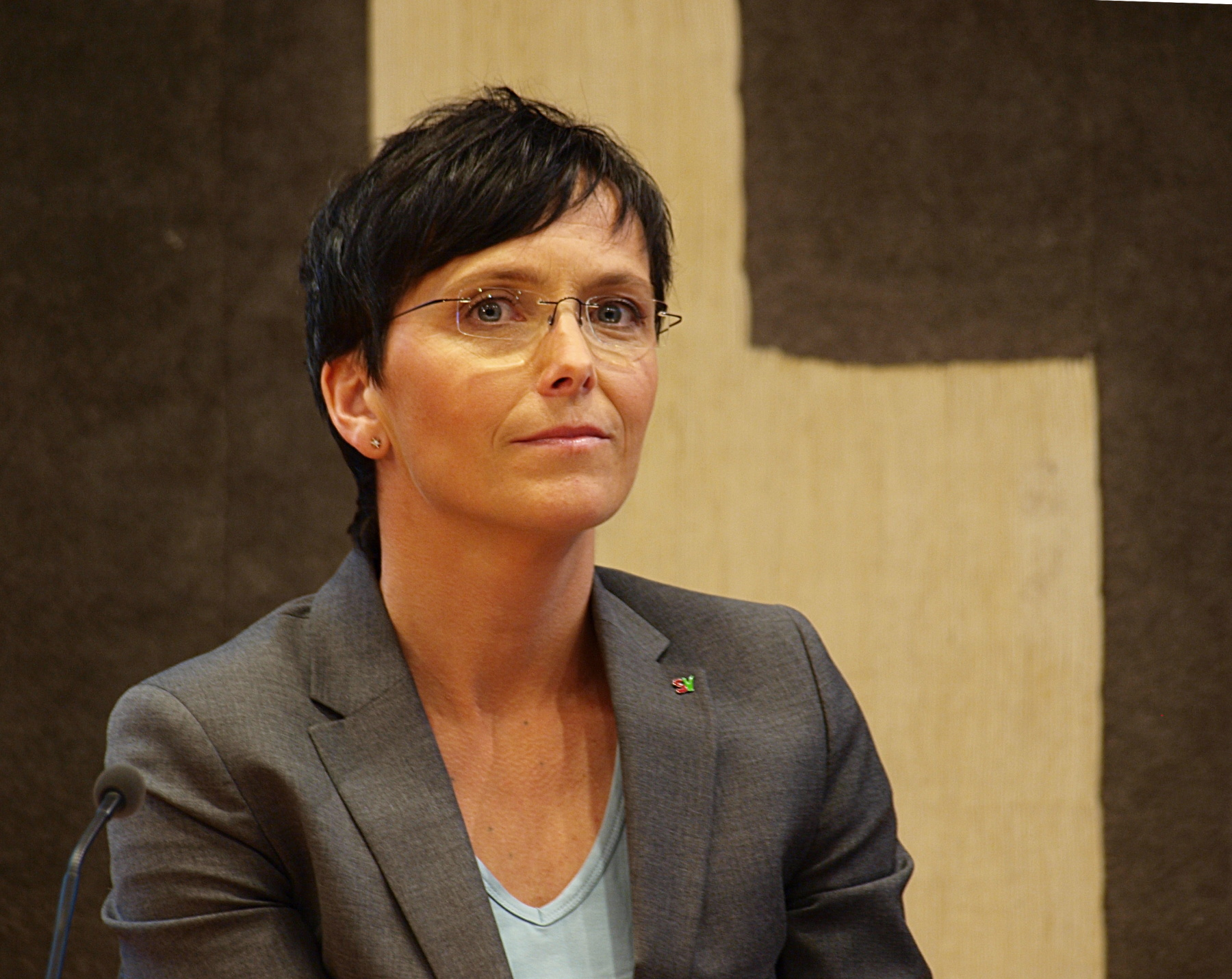
Heidi Grande Røys

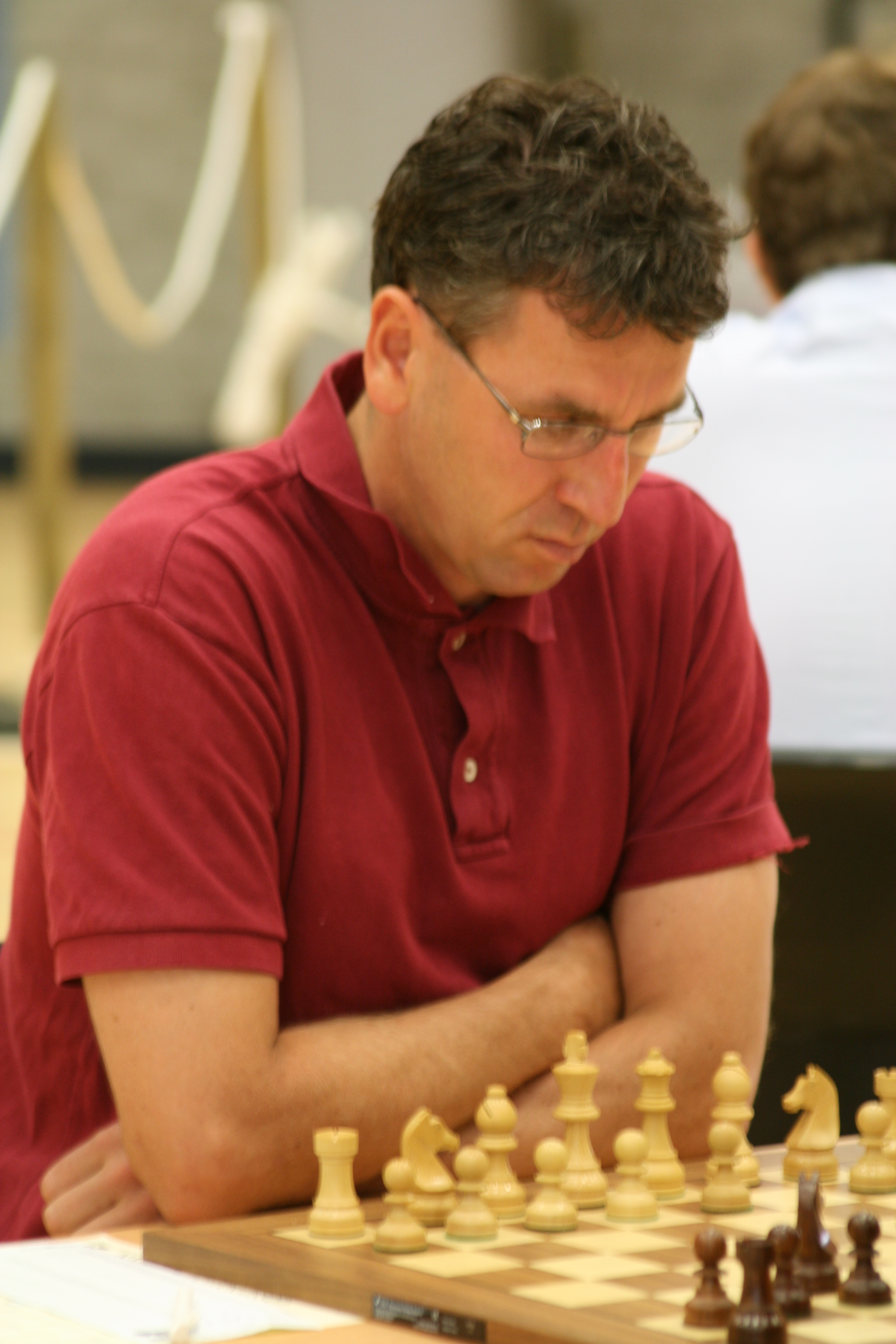
Simen Agdestein

- 6 May – Heidi Grande Røys, politician.
- 10 May – Kari-Anne Opsal, lawyer and politician.
- 12 May – Espen Berntsen, football referee
- 15 May – Simen Agdestein, chess player.
- 19 May
  - Rannveig Andresen, politician.
  - Ingjerd Egeberg, actress and theatre director.
  - Morten Tyldum, film director.
- 23 May – John Krogstie, computer scientist
- 24 May – Morten Finstad, ice hockey player.
- 25 May – Knut Holte, footballer
- 26 May – Bjørn Petter Ingebretsen, footballer
- 27 May – Kristen Skjeldal, cross-country skier.
- 28 May – Hanne Vataker, sport shooter.
- 29 May – Brynjar Meling, lawyer.

=== June ===
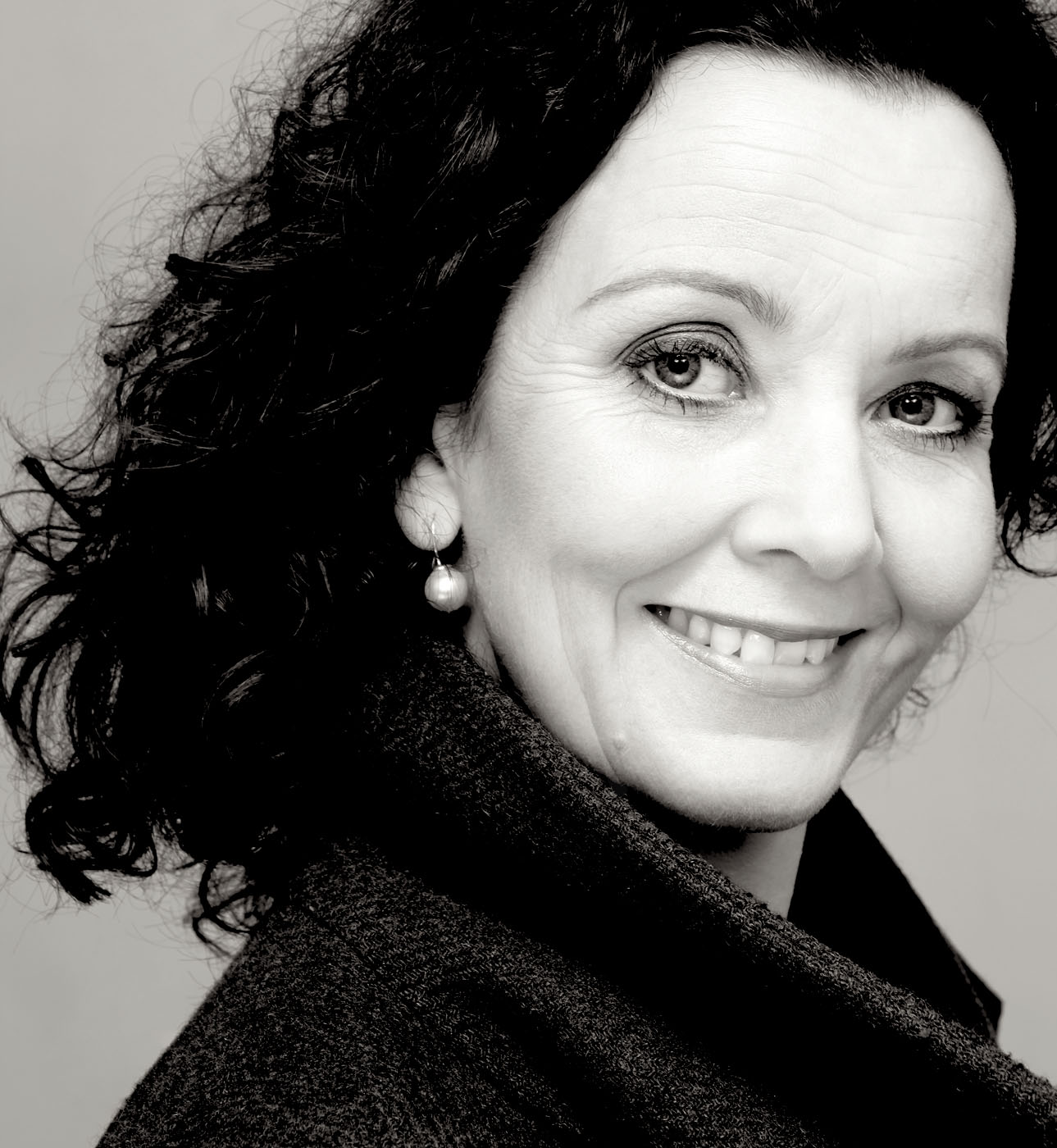
Sunniva Ørstavik

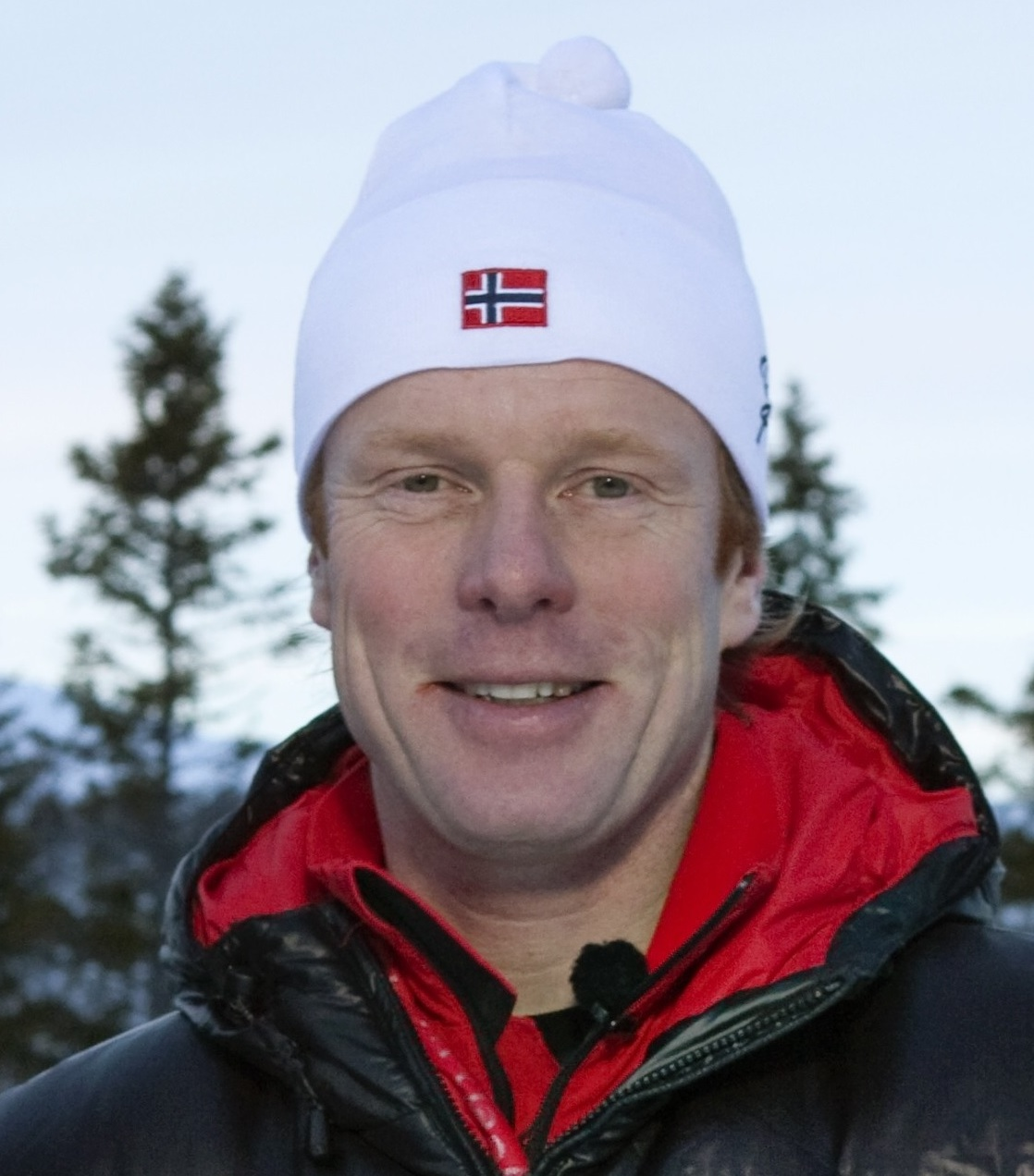
Bjørn Dæhlie

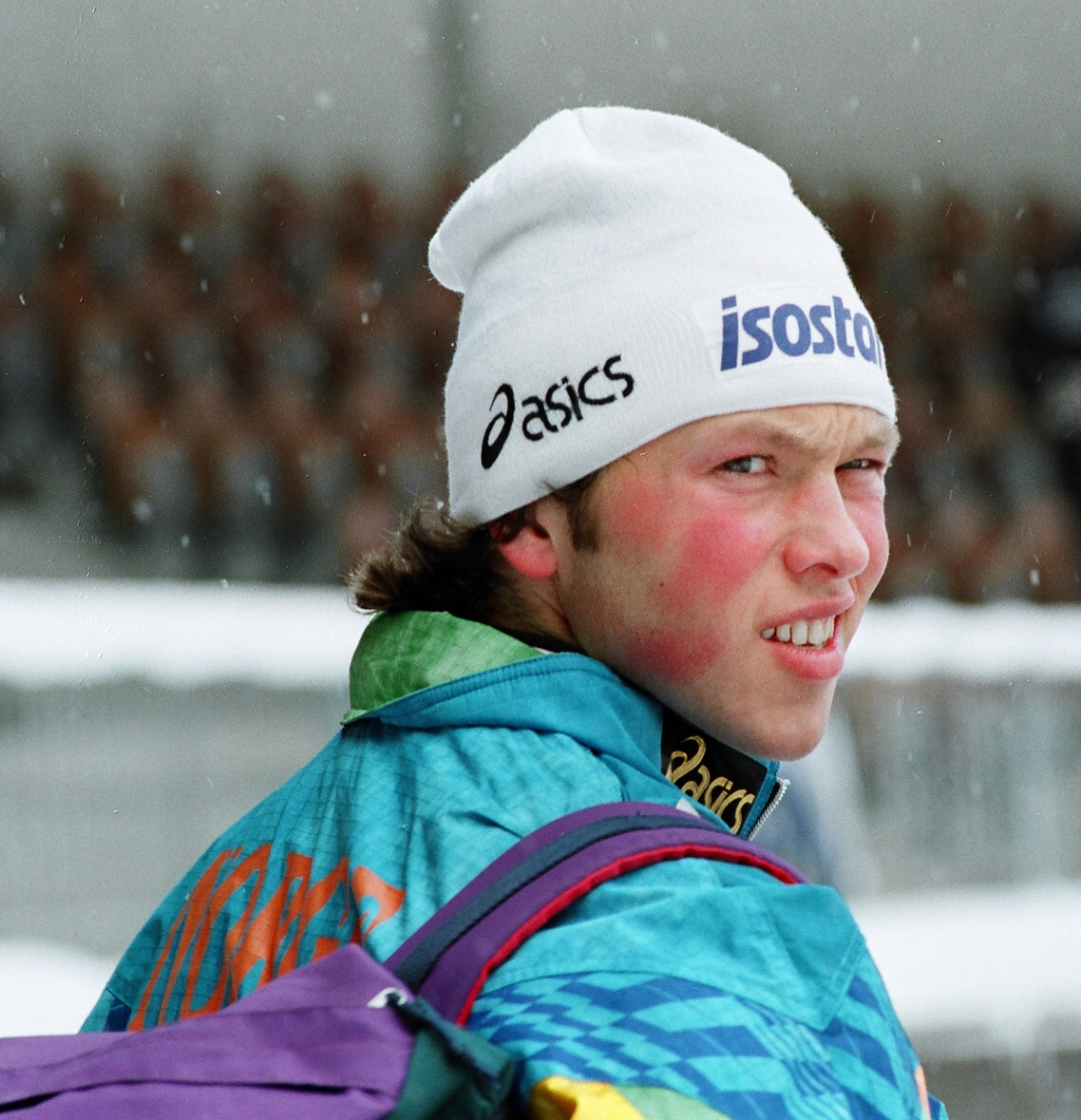
Grunde Njøs

- 1 June – Endre Brunstad, linguist
- 3 June – Stein Morten Lier, crime fiction writer.
- 4 June
  - Knut Frostad, competitive sailor.
  - Terje Sørvik, politician.
  - Runar Steinstad, Paralympian athlete
- 8 June (in Sweden) – Amy Jönsson Raaholt, tennis player
- 13 June – Sunniva Ørstavik, civil servant.
- 17 June – Cato Tom Andersen, ice hockey player.
- 18 June – Berit Opheim, singer.
- 19 June – Bjørn Dæhlie, cross-country skier and businessman.
- 20 June
  - Regina Alexandrova, politician.
  - Grunde Njøs, speed skater.
- 22 June – Morten Wold, politician.
- 26 June – Laila Thorsen, politician.
- 27 June – Runar Søgaard, management coach
- 28 June – Anne Rygh Pedersen, politician.
- 29 June – Johann Roppen, educator
- 30 June – Sture Fladmark, footballer
- 30 June (in Sweden) – Lars Vågberg, curler.

=== July ===
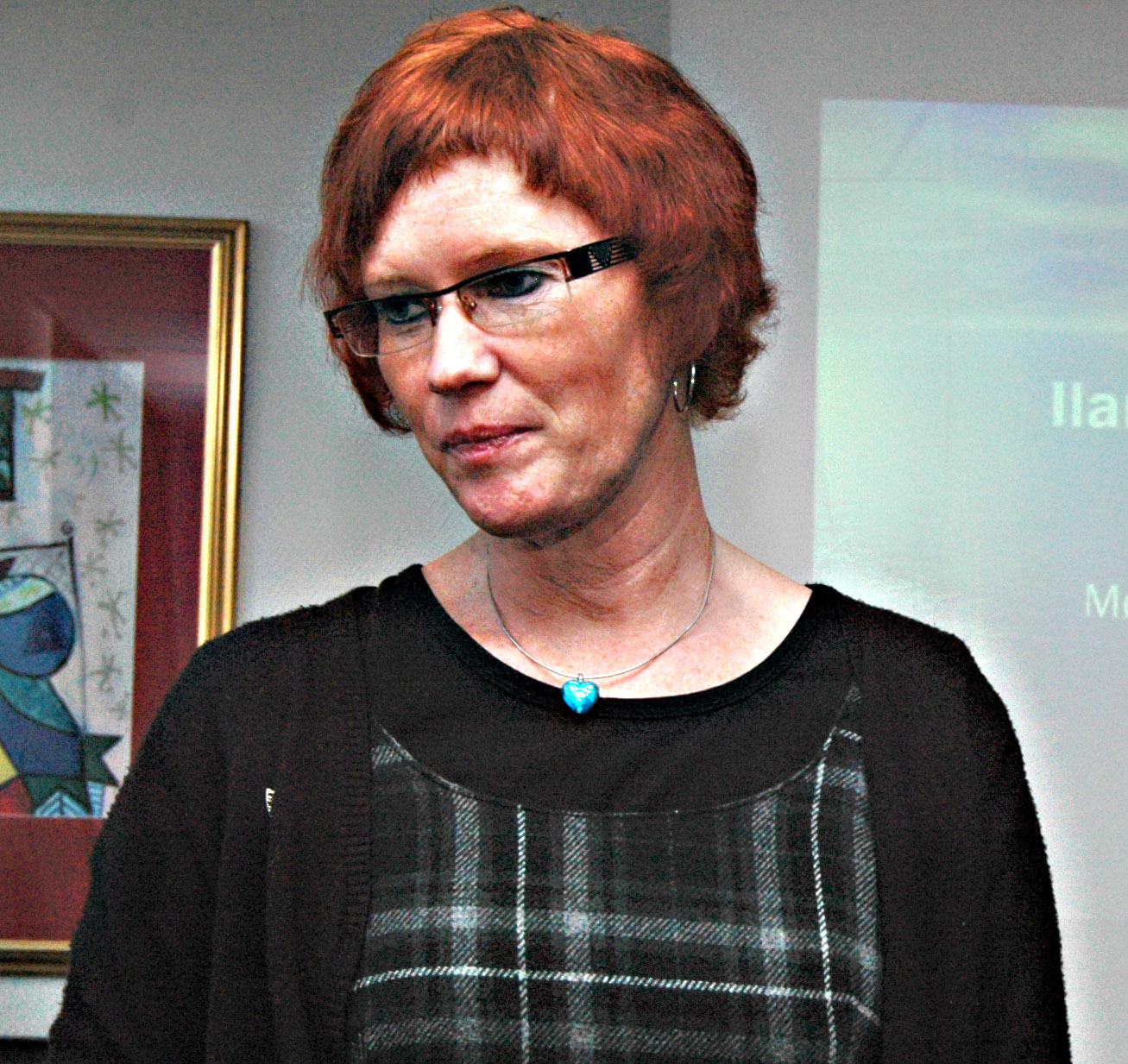
Karin Nordstad

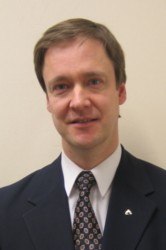
John Christian Elden

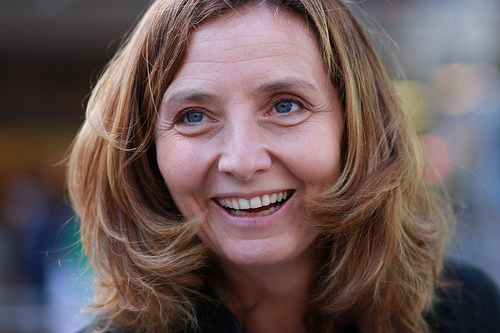
Gunn Karin Gjul

- 1 July – Karin Nordstad, politician.
- 2 July
  - John Christian Elden, barrister and politician.
  - Torgeir Larsen, diplomat and politician
- 3 July – Lisbet Rugtvedt, politician.
- 3 July – Sindre Ekrheim, poet.
- 4 July – Stig Rasch, handball player
- 10 July – Morten Kræmer, footballer
- 11 July
  - Trygve Allister Diesen, TV and film director, producer and screenwriter
  - Bent-Ove Pedersen, tennis player
- 19 July
  - Wegard Harsvik, politician.
  - Tom Johansen, ice hockey player.
- 20 July – Per J. Jordal, jurist and politician
- 25 July – Tommy Skjerven, football referee
- 26 July – Gunn Karin Gjul, politician.
- 27 July
  - Hans-Christian Gabrielsen, politician and trade unionist.
  - Hans Mathisen, jazz guitarist

=== August ===
- 1 August
  - Hugo Hansen, footballer
  - Vibeke Karlsen, football referee.
- 7 August – Gunnar Fosseng, handball player
- 11 August – Petter Wettre, jazz musician.
- 12 August – Anne Marie Halvorsen, sport wrestler.
- 17 August – Hilde Strømsvold, footballer
- 22 August – Merete Agerbak-Jensen, politician.
- 28 August – Solrun Flatås, cyclist.
- 29 August – Jon Almaas, television presenter and writer.
- 29 August (in Iceland) – Jon Stephenson von Tetzchner, programmer and businessman
- 31 August – Anita Moen, cross-country skier.

=== September ===
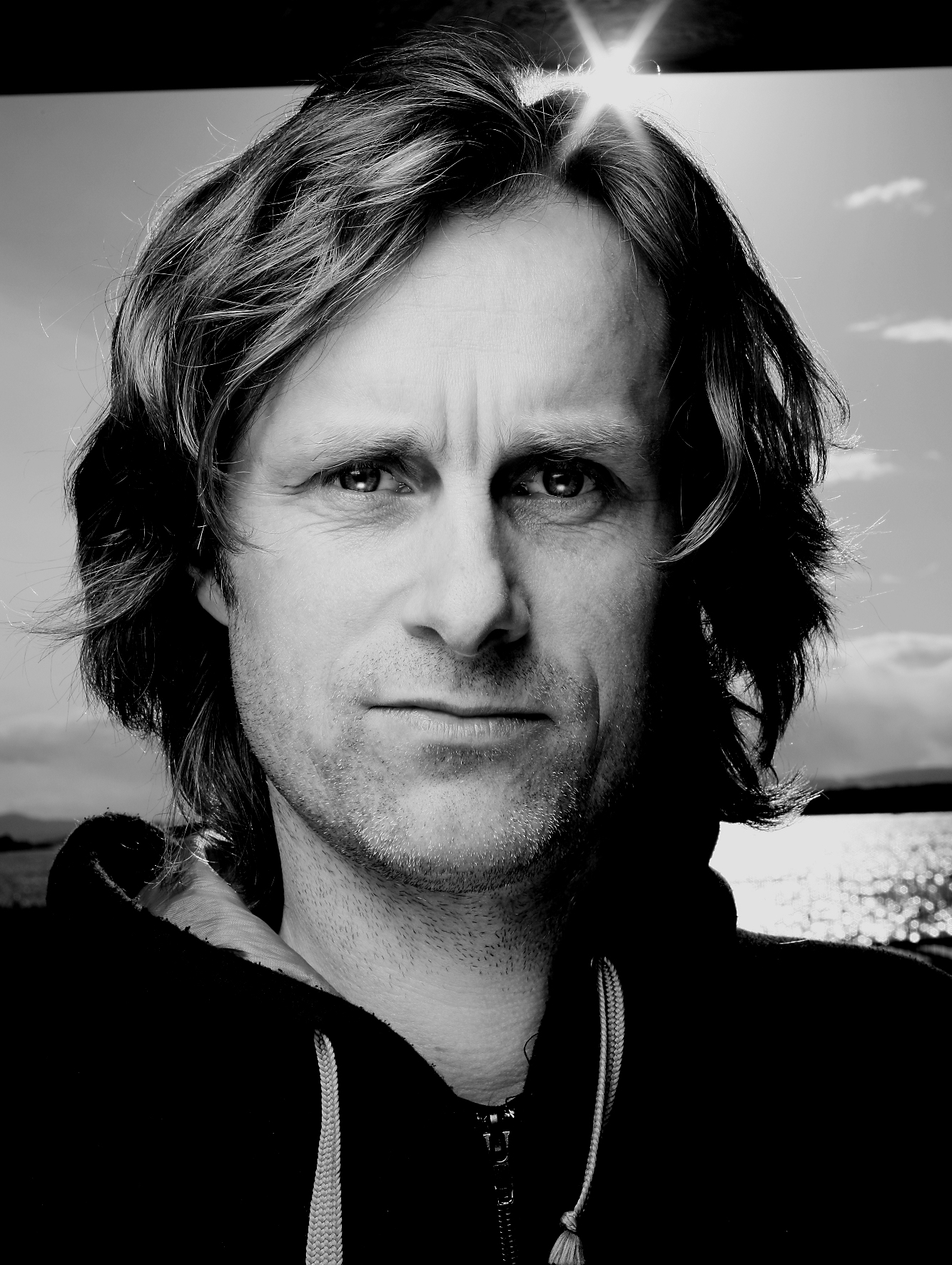
Jens Lien

- 1 September – Carl Gunnar Gundersen, ice hockey player.
- 5 September – Sturla Berg-Johansen, stand-up comedian, imitator, actor and television host
- 9 September (in Australia) – Bjarne Melgaard, artist.
- 14 September – Jens Lien, film director.
- 20 September – Pål Jackman, film director and musician.
- 23 September – Cathrine Roll-Matthiesen, handball player.

=== October ===
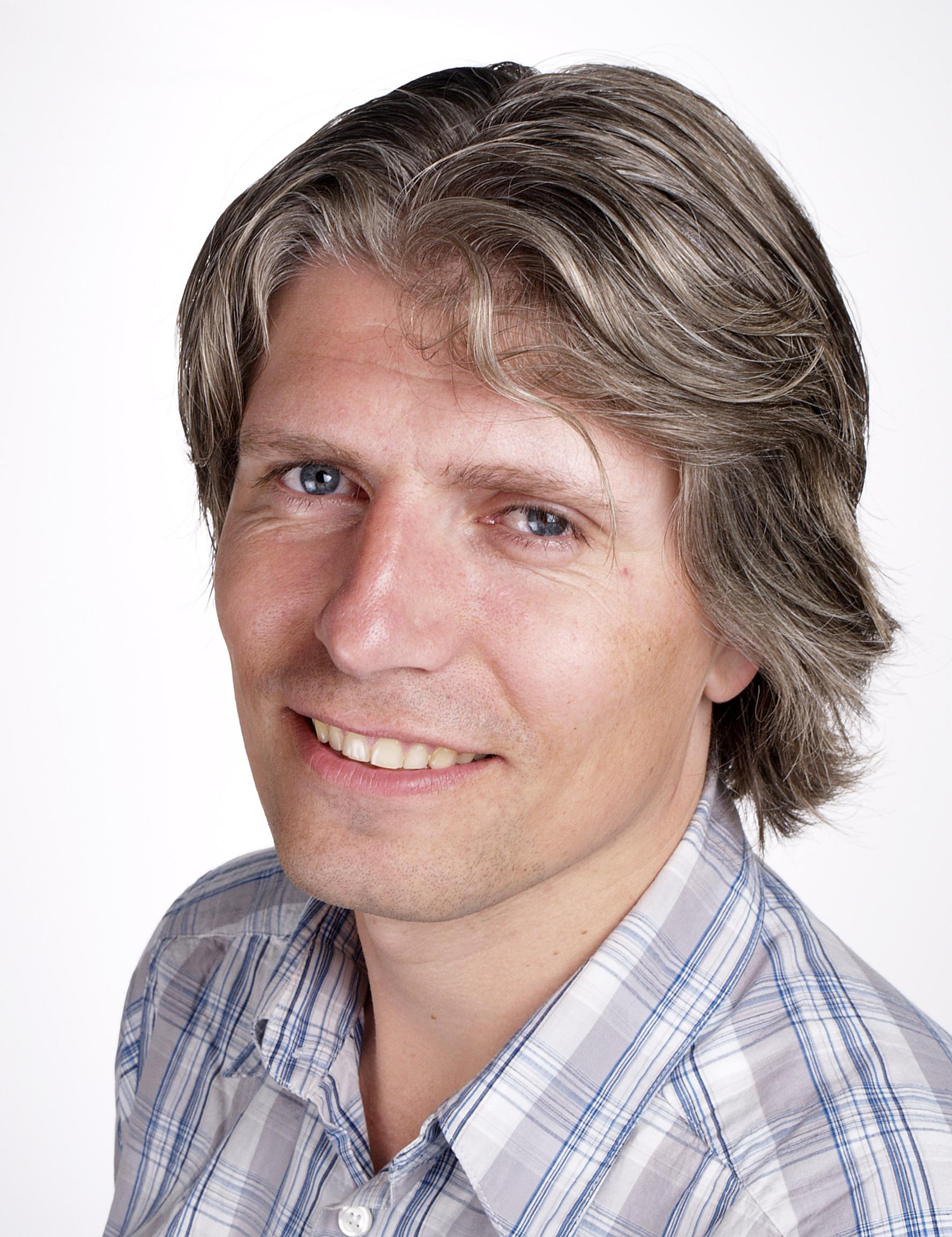
Ola Elvestuen

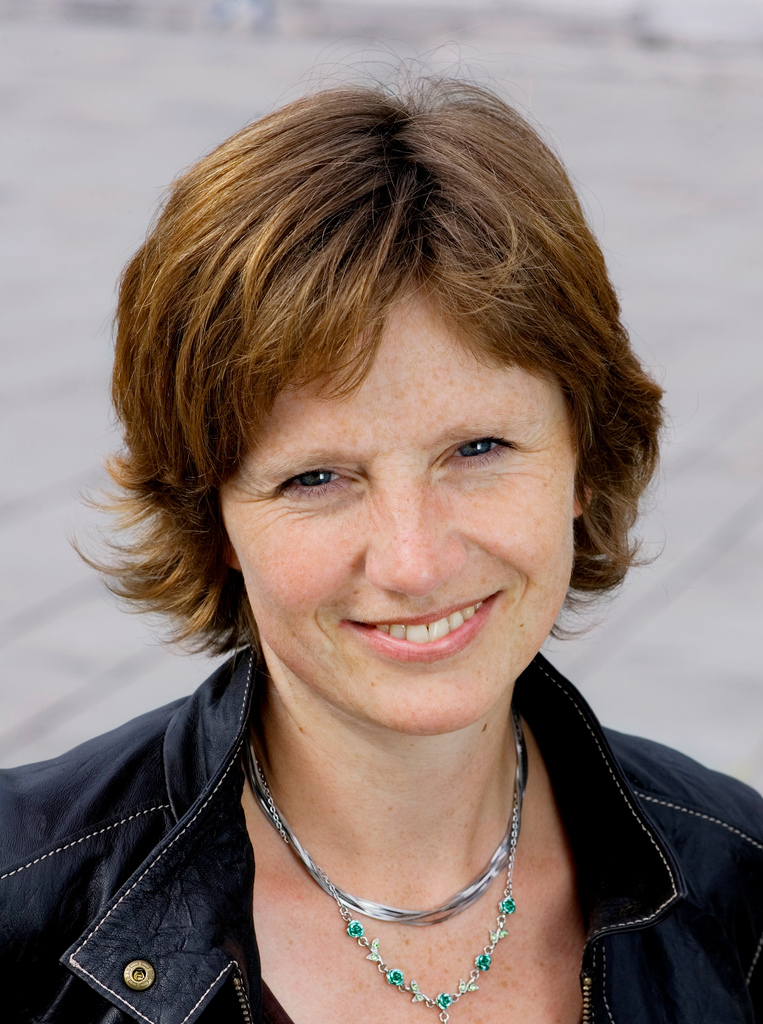
Kjersti Toppe

- 2 October – Petter Belsvik, footballer.
- 6 October – Svend Karlsen, strongman, powerlifter, and IFBB professional bodybuilder
- 9 October – Ola Elvestuen, politician.
- 11 October
  - Minna Nystedt, speed skater.
  - Erik Pedersen, footballer
- 12 October – Frode Olsen, footballer.
- 20 October
  - Petter Schjerven, television host
  - Kjersti Toppe, politician.
- 24 October – Lisbeth Bakken, footballer.

=== November ===
- 4 November – Jørn Hurum, paleontologist.
- 10 November – Kårstein Eidem Løvaas, politician (born in the US)
- 17 November – Mons Ivar Mjelde, footballer
- 29 November – Ole Gustav Gjekstad, handball player and coach.
- 30 November
  - Arild Andresen, film director
  - Bent Ånund Ramsfjell, curler.

=== December ===
- 3 December – Sjur Robert Nilsen, ice hockey player
- 12 December – Ingrid Steen, handball player.
- 14 December
  - Hanne Haugland, high jumper.
  - Anne Ryg, actress
- 15 December – André Flem, footballer
- 17 December – Ingjerd Thon Hagaseth, politician.
- 19 December – Stig Traavik, civil servant and diplomat.
- 21 December – Tonje Skinnarland, military officer.
- 23 December – Irene Nordli, sculptor

=== Full date missing ===
- April – Paal Kibsgaard, petroleum engineer and businessman
- Helge Blakkisrud, political scientist
- Herman Cappelen, philosopher
- Remi Eriksen, businessman
- Steinar Haugli, sport shooter
- Erik W. Jakobsen, business economist
- Linda Johansen, magazine editor and businesswoman
- Thor Alex Kappfjell, offshore worker and BASE jumper (d. 1999).
- Javed Kurd, music producer
- Johannes W. Løvhaug, historian
- Jelena Porsanger, Sami ethnographer (born in the Soviet Union)
- Petter S. Rosenlund, dramatist
- Oddrun Samdal, academic
- Pål Thonstad Sandvik, historian
- Kjetil Ulven, ski orienteer
- Cecilie Cottis Østreng, poet

== Notable deaths ==
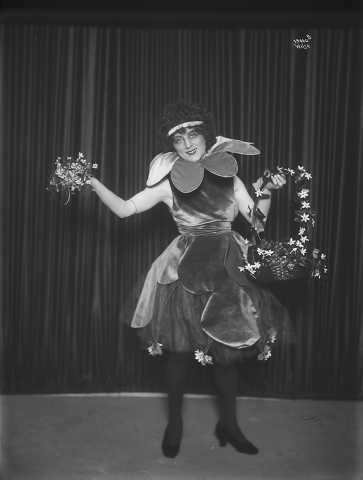
Lalla Carlsen

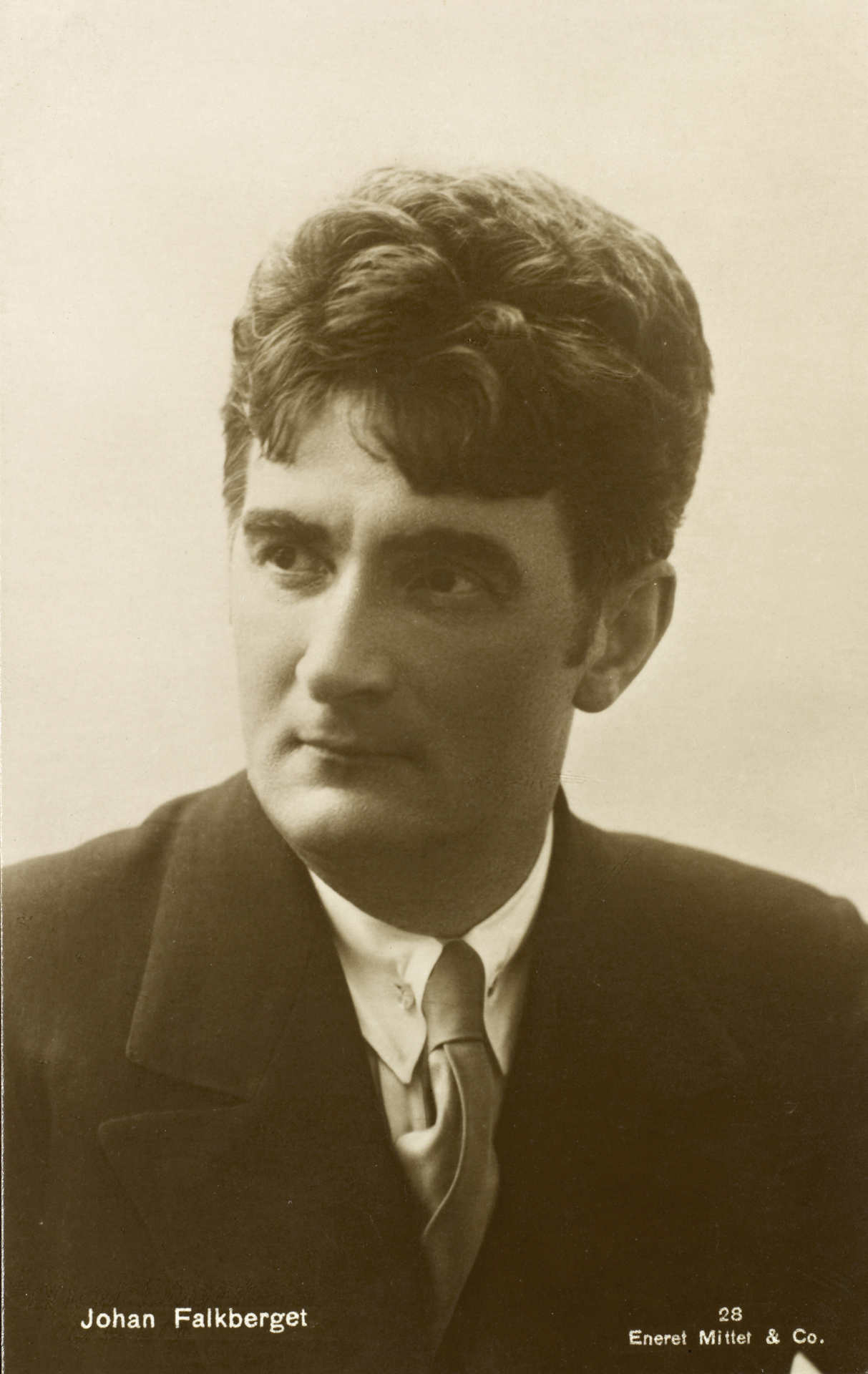
Johan Falkberget

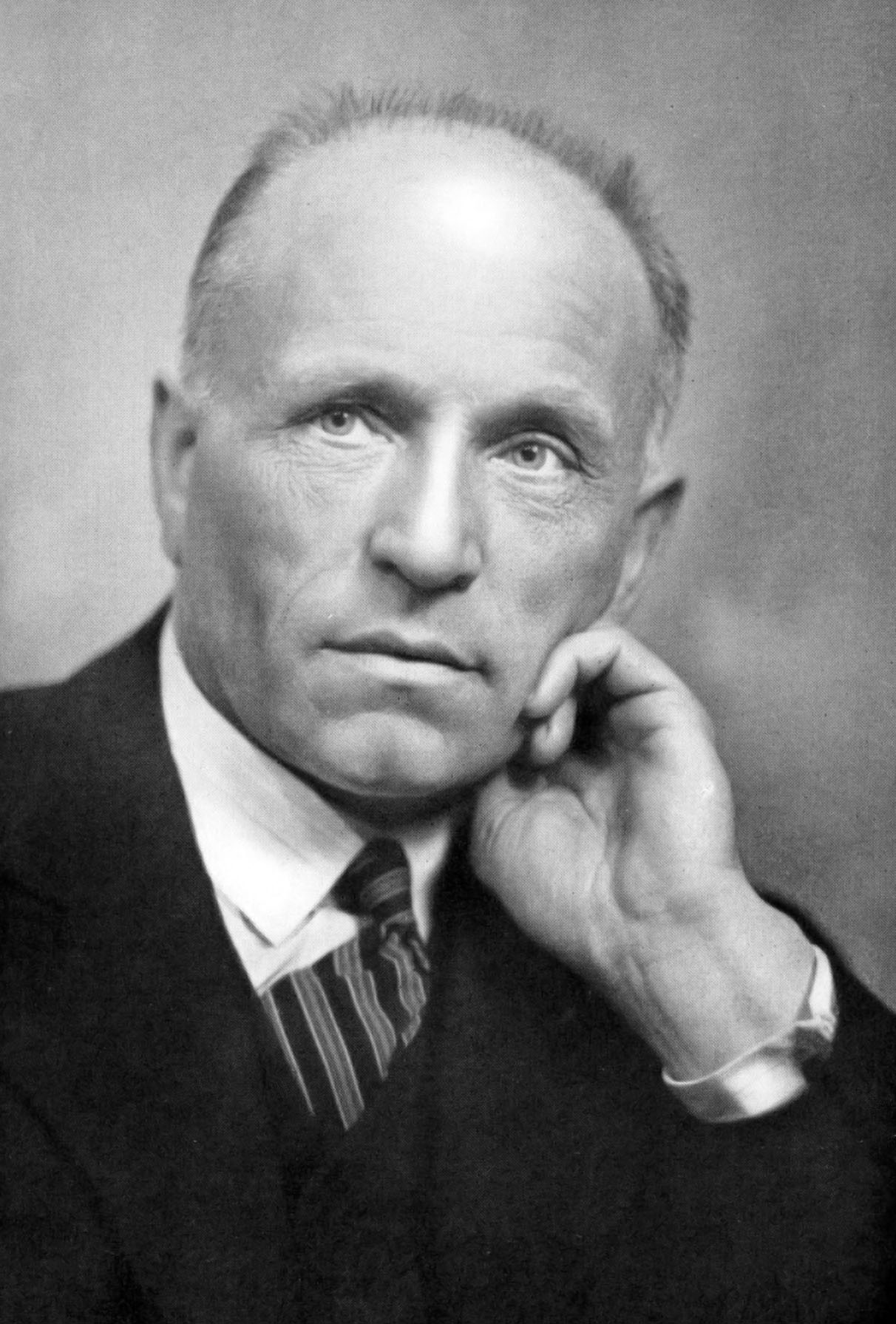
Martin Tranmæl

- 3 January – H. O. Bergqvist, engineer, businessman and politician (b. 1889)
- 12 January – Per Øisang, journalist and radio and television presenter (b.1920)
- 21 January – Halfdan Magnus Mustad, businessman (b. 1874).
- 27 January – Christian A. R. Christensen, newspaper editor (b. 1906).
- 28 January – Leonhard Seppala, sled dog breeder, trainer and musher (b. 1877).
- 29 January – Gunnar Ousland, writer, editor and politician for the Labour Party(b.1877).
- 31 January – Peder Nikolai Leier Jacobsen, politician (b.1888).
- 10 February – Harald Warholm, politician (b.1920).
- 13 February – Edvin Alten, judge (b.1876).
- 15 February – Rasmus Sørnes, inventor, clockmaker and radio technician (b.1893).
- 16 February – Amund Rydland, stage and film actor and theatre director (b. 1888).
- 25 February – Olaf Willums, painter and printmaker (b. 1886).
- 26 or 27 February – Thor Solberg, aviation pioneer (b. 1893).
- 28 February – Kaare Strøm, limnologist (b.1902).
- 3 March – Mons Lid, politician and Minister (b.1896).
- 3 March – Jan Petersen, archaeologist (b. 1887).
- 8 March – Asbjørn Lindboe, politician (b. 1889).
- 16 March – Jakob Sande, writer, poet and folk singer (b.1906).
- 20 March – Anders Bjørgaard, illustrator (b. 1891).
- 23 March – Lalla Carlsen, singer and actress (b. 1889).
- 2 April – Richard Peterson, tennis player (b. 1884).
- 5 April – Johan Falkberget, author (b.1879).
- 14 April – Bertha Bele, politician (b. 1893).
- 20 April – Birger Ljungberg, politician and minister (b.1884).
- 2 May – Paul Martin Dahlø, politician (b.1885).
- 5 May – Hans Amundsen, journalist and politician (b. 1885).
- 14 May – Jens Isak de Lange Kobro, politician and Minister (b.1882).
- 22 May – Knut Gysler, equestrian (b. 1888).
- 24 May – Dagfinn Dahl, barrister (b. 1887).
- 26 May – Astri Welhaven Heiberg, painter (b. 1881).
- 7 June – Finn Schiander, sailor (b. 1889).
- 9 June – Gunnar Neels-Hansson, theatre director (b. 1883).
- 10 June – Halvard Angaard, sport shooter (b. 1898).
- 11 June – Johan Sigurd Karlsen, politician (b.1894).
- 15 June – H. Chr. J. Borchgrevink, engineer and politician (b. 1891).
- 16 June – Ragnar Vold, journalist (b. 1906).
- 20 June – Hans Oskar Evju, politician (b.1886).
- 23 June – Otto Lous Mohr, medical doctor (b. 1886).
- 11 July – Martin Tranmæl, socialist leader (b.1879).
- 25 July – Anton Marius Jenssen, merchant and politician (b. 1879).
- 26 July – Arne Ording, historian and politician (b. 1898).
- 2 August – Haavard Martinsen, chemist and industrial leader (b. 1879).
- 11 August – Olav Moe, fiddler (b. 1872).
- 13 August – Trygve Pedersen, sailor and Olympic bronze medallist (b.1884).
- 16 August – Arthur Omre, novelist and writer of short stories (b. 1887).
- 16 August – Marguerite Thoresen, ballet dancer and choreographer (b. 1908).
- 18 August – Ivar Bae, politician (b.1896).
- 27 August – Herman Sotaaen, track and field athlete (b. 1888).
- 28 August – Nils Langhelle, politician and Minister (b.1907).
- 5 September – Thorleif Dahl, philologist and businessman (b. 1891).
- 5 September – Alfred Maurstad, actor, movie director and theatre manager (b. 1896).
- 15 September – Hannibal Fegth, rower (b. 1879).
- 17 September – Sven Thaulow, sport swimmer (b. 1905).
- 19 September – Andreas Hagelund, gymnast and Olympic gold medallist (b.1881).
- 6 October – Sigurd Moen, speed skater and Olympic bronze medallist (b.1897).
- 8 October – Johan Schreiner, historian (b. 1903).
- 15 October – Ejnar Tønsager, rower (b.1888).
- 20 October – Sverre Iversen, trade unionist, civil servant and politician (b. 1879).
- 21 October – Fridtjof Mjøen, actor and theatre director (born 1897).
- 29 October – Roy Mikkelsen, a Norwegian born, American Olympic ski jumper (b. 1907).
- 2 November – Leif Rode, competitive rower, jurist, sports official, poet and playwright (b. 1885).
- 5 November – Erling Johnson, chemical engineer (b. 1893)
- 21 November – Gunvald Bøe, archivist and historian (b. 1903/1904)
- 26 November – Johannes Hanssen, bandmaster, composer and teacher (b.1874).
- 1 December – Elen Christensen, sculptor (b. 1904).
- 2 December – Johannes Andersen, long-distance runner (b.1888).
- 7 December – Daniel Johansen, track and field athlete (b.1885).
- 9 December – Ragnar Solberg, poet (b. 1898).
- 12 December – Alf Larsen, poet, essayist and magazine editor (b. 1885).
- 22 December – Wilhelm Faye, military officer and war historian (b. 1881).
- 30 December – Kjell Gjøstein Aabrek, politician (b.1901).

=== Full date missing ===
- Erling Tambs, writer and sailor (b. 1888)
- Harry Ivarson, film director and screenwriter (b. 1892)
