= Oscar Pedersen =

Oscar Pedersen is the name of:

- Oscar Pedersen (politician) (1885–1939), Norwegian newspaper editor and politician
- Oscar Pedersen (businessman) (1857–1913), Norwegian industrialist
- Oscar Gundlach-Pedersen (1886-1960), Danish architect
