= Knut Holte =

Knut Holte may refer to:

- Knut Holte (footballer)
- Knut Holte (poet)
