= Østreng =

Østreng is a Norwegian surname. Notable people with the surname include:

- Aleksander Østreng (born 1991), Norwegian snowboarder
- Cecilie Cottis Østreng (born 1967), Norwegian lyricist
- Willy Østreng (born 1941), Norwegian political scientist
