= Skinnarland =

Skinnarland is a surname. Notable people with the surname include:

- Einar Skinnarland (1918–2002), Norwegian resistance fighter
- Tonje Skinnarland (born 1967), Norwegian major general
