= Arbeider-Politikken =

Norwegian newspaper published in Oslo

Arbeider-Politikken ("The Worker Politics") was a Norwegian newspaper, published in Oslo.

Arbeider-Politikken was started in 1920 as an organ for the right-wing group within the Norwegian Labour Party. Since 1918 this had been an oppositional group, mainly to the party's Comintern association. Its first editor was Oscar Pedersen. In 1921, when the Social Democratic Labour Party of Norway broke away from the Labour Party, Arbeider-Politikken became the party's main organ.

In 1924 Hans Amundsen took over as editor. When the Labour Party's main organ Social-Demokraten changed its name to Arbeiderbladet, Arbeider-Politikken changed its name to Den nye Social-Demokraten as a demonstration. The newspaper went defunct in 1927, when Social Democratic Labour reunited with Labour.
