= Eskoleia Stål =

Norwegian manufacturing company

External images
- 1951 photo of the factory, by Helge Skappel for Widerøe
- 1957 photo of the factory, by Otto Hansen for Widerøe
- Steel fence with Norsk Gjærde- og Metaldukfabrik's trademark sign

Eskoleia Stål is a manufacturing company located in Kongsvinger, Norway. It was formerly known under several names; Norsk Gjærde- og Metaldukfabrik for the longest period; and was located in Oslo.

== History ==
It was founded on 15 February 1910 as Norsk Gjærde- og Metaldukfabrik (many alternative spellings) by Magnus Blikstad. When he died, Gustaf Aspelin took over. Long-time manager was H. O. Bergqvist. The headquarters and production facilities were located in Strømsveien 128 at Valle-Hovin.

One of its main products was the fence, the "national fence". After about 40 years of operation the company had a 35% market share in wire mesh and wire cloth delivered to the pulp and paper industry. Other products were barbed wire, gates of iron, welded iron, platework, drying stands and wardrobe lockers.

In 1961 the company leaders decided to open a new factory, Vire- og Metalldukfabrikken, in Eidsfoss in cooperation with the company Eidsfos Verk. By the mid-1960s, Norsk Gjærde- og Metaldukfabrik had departments for stainless production, glass fiber-armed polyester, flat-rolled steel plates and signs.

In the 1960s, the road Strømsveien was re-regulated to highway standard. This set serious restraints on the expansion capacity in the vicinity of Norsk Gjærde- og Metaldukfabrik. In 1966 it therefore had to establish facilities in a more rural town, Kongsvinger. For this they received 500,000 kr in support from the Regional Development Fund. Around 1968 it changed its name to Norsk Gjærde og Mekanisk Verksted.

Despite "Gjærde" (fence) being a part of the name, the leadership decided to rid the company of fence production. The relevant machinery was taken over by Christiania Spigerverk, through its subsidiary Stål og Tau. Machinery for producing mesh was taken over by another fence company, C. Geijer & Co. Flat-rolled plates would be the company's flagship product. In late 1969 another important step was taken as it was decided to move to Kongsvinger entirely, except for the sales division which would remain in Oslo. The localities in Strømsveien were sold to Harald A. Møller.

In the first ten years in Kongsvinger, the company expanded from 2,400 square metres (26,000 sq ft) of industrial space to 6,000 square metres (65,000 sq ft). The name was also changed, to NGM Industrier. The company was bought by Aspelin-Stormbull in 1987, and later became a part of Eskoleia which is owned by Kongsvinger Municipality and Eidskog Municipality. Eskoleia Stål is still based in Kongsvinger.
