= Stein Morten Lier =

Norwegian writer (born 1967)

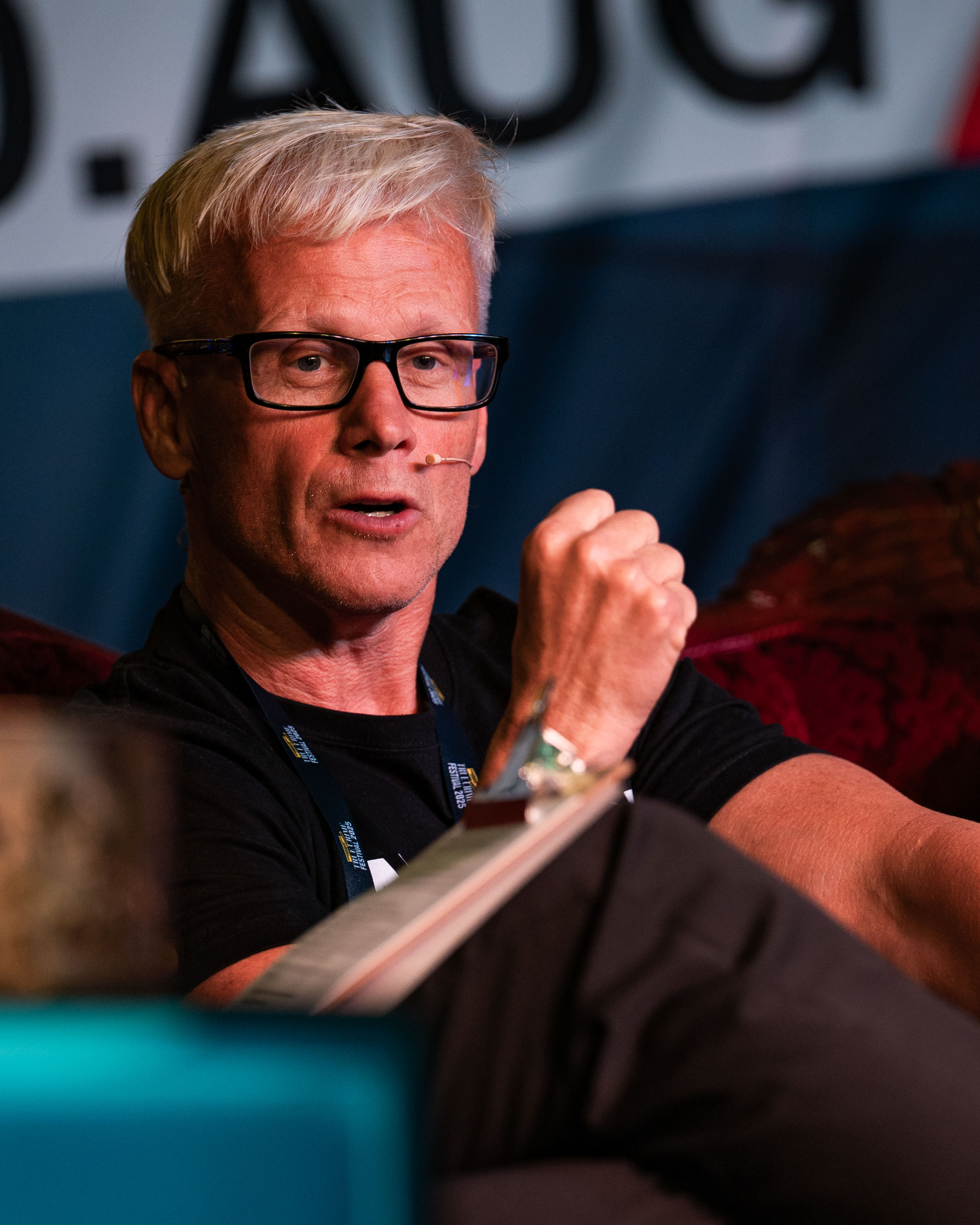
Lier at the True Crime festival in Arendal, Norway, 2025

Stein Morten Lier (born 3 June 1967) is a Norwegian crime novelist.

He is a son of police chief Leif A. Lier. Documentaric and semi-documentaric books include En reisende i drap (2002), Illusjonen som brast (2006) and Rikets tilstand (2007). Crime fiction releases include Catch (2004), Mafiya (2005), Bizniz (2006) and Øye for øye (2008).
