= Knut Holte (poet) =

Knut Holte (born 1949) is a Norwegian poet.

He was born and grew up in Harstad, and became a secondary school teacher in the same city.

His poetry collections are Vindtid (1977), Reis deg og syng (1978) and Vinterhimmel (1982) published by Gyldendal; Blå drage (1991) Tiden; and Utanfor byen (1996) published by Solum.

Blå drage was reviewed by outlets around Norway.
