= Karin Søraunet =

Norwegian politician (born 1967)

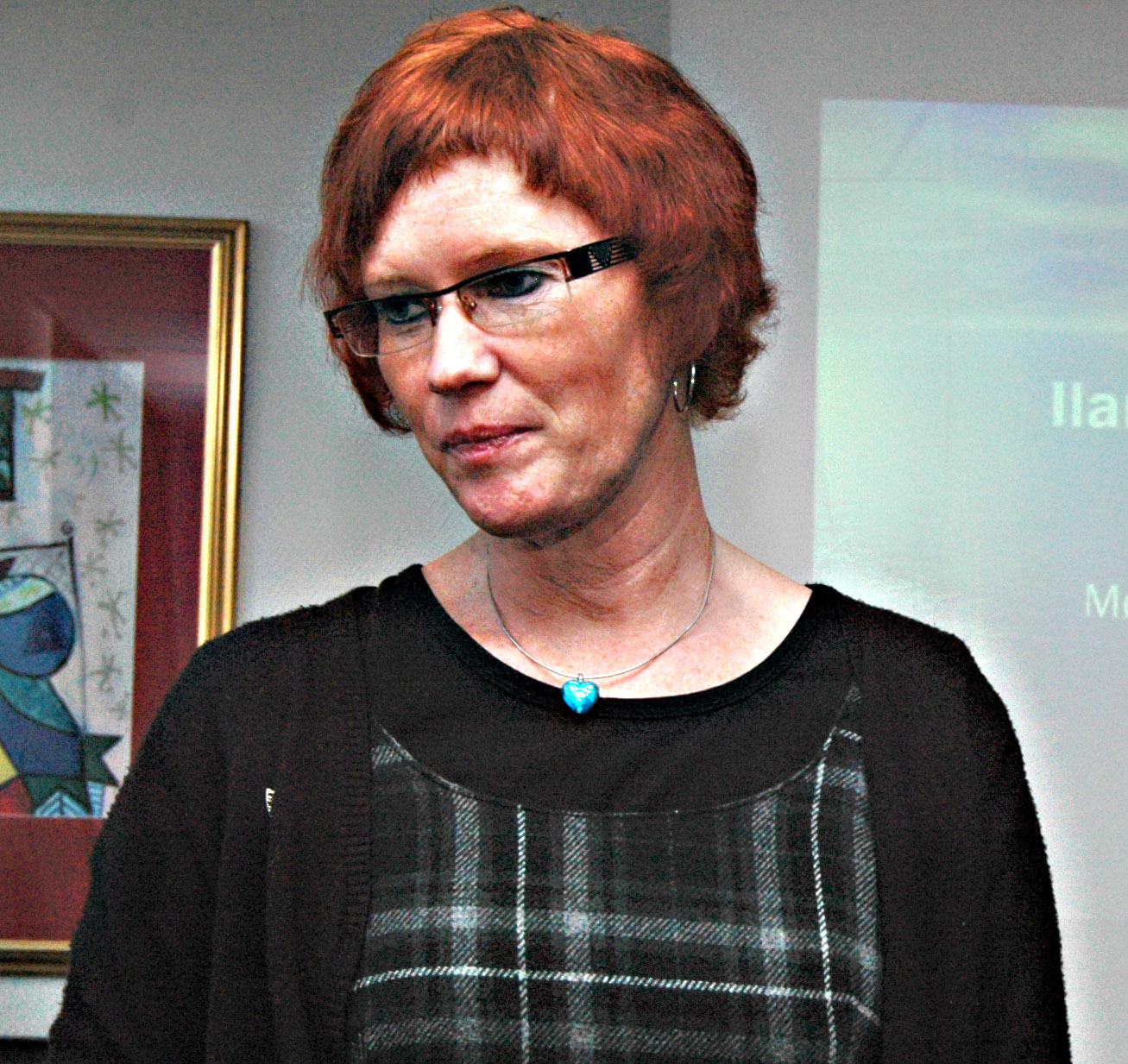
Karin Søraunet

Karin Søraunet (born 1 July 1967) is a Norwegian politician for the Christian Democratic Party.

She served as a deputy representative to the Norwegian Parliament from Nord-Trøndelag during the term 2001–2005.

On the local level Søraunet was elected mayor of Vikna Municipality in 2005.
