= Frode Thomassen =

Norwegian footballer (born 1967)

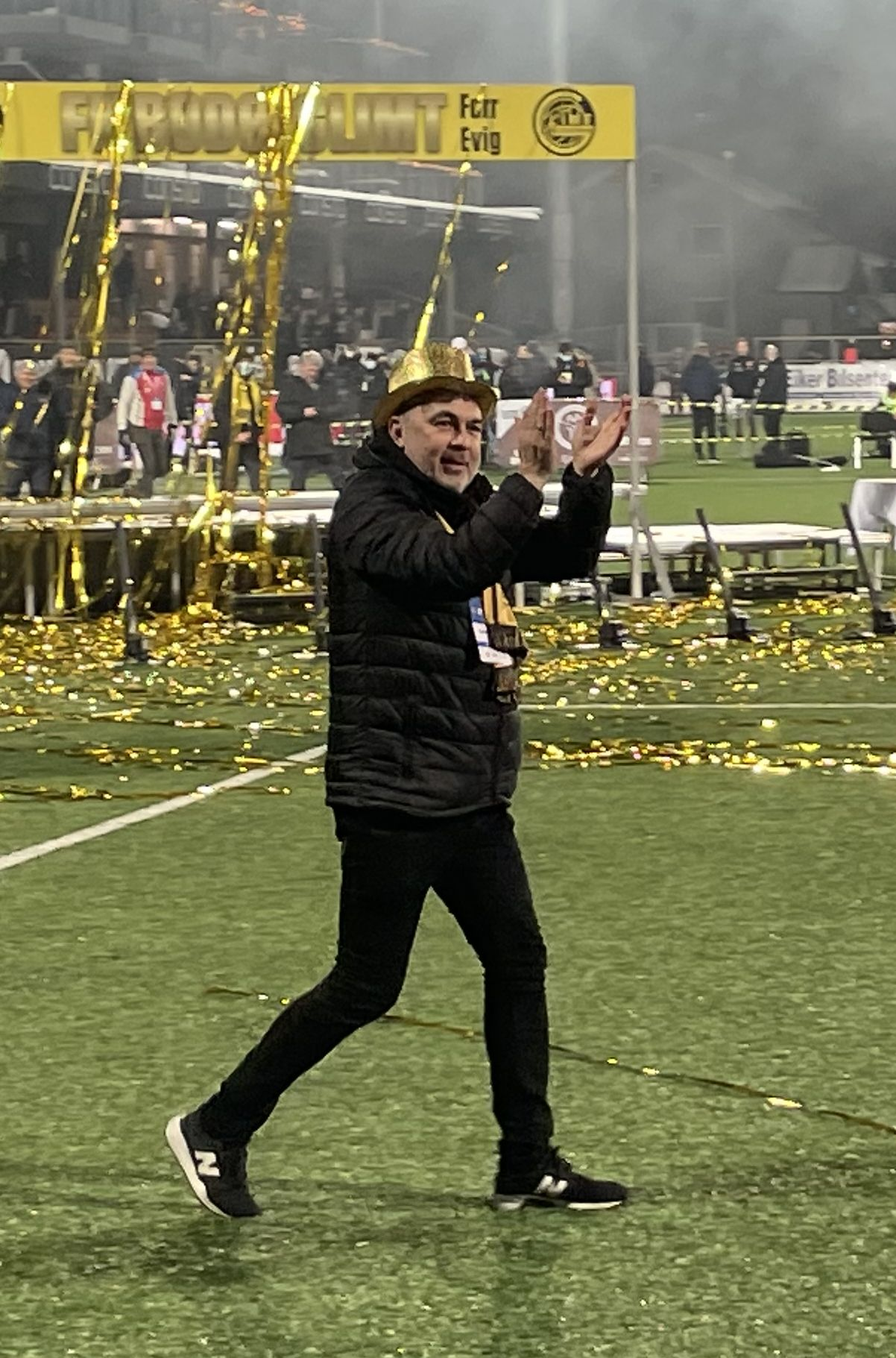
- Norwegian Premiership 2021

Personal information
- Date of birth: 20 April 1967 (age 59)
- Height: 1.81 m (5 ft 11 in)
- Position: Midfielder

Senior career*
Years	Team	Apps	(Gls)
–1987	Fauske/Sprint		
1988–1991	Lyn		
1992	Stabæk	19	(0)

Managerial career
- 2017–: Bodø/Glimt (managing director)
- * Club domestic league appearances and goals

Frode Thomassen (born 20 April 1967) is a retired Norwegian football midfielder.

He joined Lyn from FK liten/Sprint and played four seasons for the senior team, the last one in Eliteserien where he got 3 games. He went on to Stabæk, playing 0 league games.

After working in the Norwegian Ministry of Culture and the administration of Nord University, he was hired in 2017 as managing director of FK Bodø/Glimt.
