= Hilde Strømsvold =

Norwegian footballer (born 1967)

Personal information
- Date of birth: 17 August 1967 (age 59)
- Position: Goalkeeper

International career
Years	Team	Apps	(Gls)
1990–1992	Norway	7	(0)
Medal record
Representing Norway
Women's football
World Cup
Silver medal – second place	China 1991	Team

Hilde Strømsvold (born 17 August 1967) is a Norwegian former football goalkeeper who played for the Norway women's national football team.

She played on the Norwegian team that won silver medals at the 1991 FIFA Women's World Cup in China.
