= Rannveig Andresen =

Norwegian politician (born 1967)

Rannveig Kvifte Andresen (born 19 May 1967) is a Norwegian politician for the Socialist Left Party.

== Biography ==
Andresen is a daughter of civil engineer Per Terje Andresen and psychologist Inger-Lise Kvifte Andresen. She finished upper secondary school in 1986, worked for the Norwegian Confederation of Trade Unions for two years before taking higher education. She minored in social anthropology and political science before majoring in pedagogy.

She was a member of the Workers' Youth League from 1985 to 1987, but then joined the Socialist Youth. She represented the Socialist Left Party in Ski municipal council from 1991 to 2011, from 1995 to 2003 in the executive committee. She served as a deputy representative to the Parliament of Norway from Akershus during the terms 2005–2009 and 2009–2013. When regular representative Bård Vegar Solhjell became cabinet member in March 2012, Andresen took his place as a regular. Elected for a third term as deputy in 2013–2017, the cabinet fell and Andresen was no longer a regular.

Andresen has been a board member of Follo Ren from 2006 and the Norwegian Association of Local and Regional Authorities in Akershus from 2007.
