= Pål Christian Roland =

Norwegian health administrator and politician

Pål Christian Roland (born 30 January 1967) is a Norwegian health administrator and politician for the Christian Democratic Party.

He has a siv.øk. degree from the Norwegian School of Management and a master's degree in health administration from the University of Oslo. He served as secretary-general of the Youth of the Christian People's Party from 1994 to 1995. From 2001 to 2004, under the second cabinet Bondevik, he was a political advisor to Dagfinn Høybråten in the Ministry of Health and Care Services. He left politics in 2004 to become CEO of the Norwegian Association of Pharmaceutical Manufacturers.

Since 2009 he is director (for "needs analysis and requisitions") at Helse Sør-Øst RHF. He has also been active in the Church of Norway.
