= Elen Christensen =

Norwegian sculptor

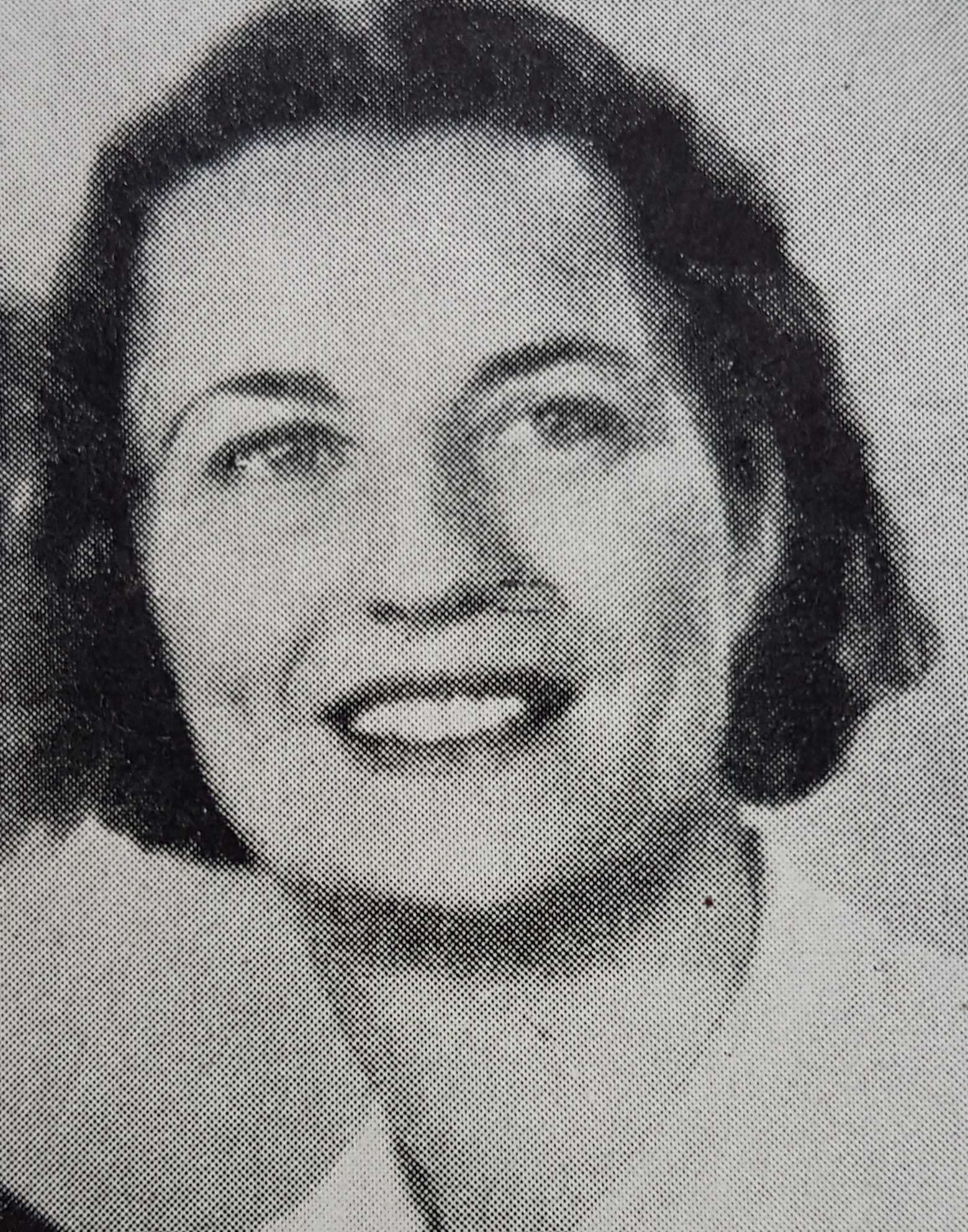
- Born: January 11, 1904; Norway
- Died: December 1, 1967 (aged 63)
- Occupation: Artist

Elen Sofie Elster Christensen (11 January 1904 – 1 December 1967) was a Norwegian sculptor of the 20th century. Her public works grace a number of Norwegian cities and towns, including Gutten som ser fremover, a statue in Trondheim that honors shipping magnate Harry Borthens.

Christensen debuted her art in 1936 with the sculpted female head entitled Helg. In 1942, during the German occupation, she held her first solo show at Hammerlunds Kunsthandel, Oslo, under the title Skulptur i hjemmene (Sculpture in Homes). During her career, her works were exhibited in a number of shows into the 1960s, including in Sweden and France.

Her works are mainly small format pieces in bronze and terracotta with a disciplined sense of form. Children and animals were her preferred subject models, resulting in such works as Liten Adam in polished black syenite (1936), Stolarrest (bronze, 1950), Abe med Honningkake (colored terracotta, 1959) and Reinsdyråring får horn (1962).

Christensen created a series of portraits and busts that are characterized by the expression of the subjects’ being and personality through form and line, such as, for example, in the bust of director Sigurd Houth (bronze, 1942). Other busts include those of architect J.F. Macody Lund (1944), and the jurist and World War II resistance hero Johan Bernhard Hjort.

== Personal life and education ==
Born to Hjalmar Christensen, a writer and journalist, and Olga Helberg (who was herself an artist) in Oslo on 11 January 1904, Christensen was raised by her mother and step-father, who was a priest, after her parents divorced. Her mother Olga had trained in Berlin as an artist of fine arts, and this apparently led Christensen to pursue an artistic endeavor as well, although she initially trained as an agronomist.

She began her artistic training as a visiting student at the Norwegian Institute of Technology under Professor Harald Krohg Stabell, studying drawing and watercolor, and under sculptor Harald Samuelsen studying modeling. She also attended the National Art Academy in Oslo under Wilhelm Rasmussen from 1934 to 1937 and was a student of the famed Emile-Antoine Bourdelle in Paris.

She was married three times, to Peter Holst Høstmark, Bjørn Ivar Sundet Johanssen, and Sigurd Bjørnsen. She had at least two children, one by Høstmark and other with Johanssen. Her granddaughter is also an artist.

Elen Christensen died in Oslo on 1 December 1967.

== Public works and works in public collections ==
- Bust of J.F. Macody Lund (bronze, 1944), Vår Frelsers Gravlund (Cemetery) Oslo
- Tenåring (Teen) (1960), Sandnes high school
- Gutten som ser fremover (bronze, ca. 1961), Trondheim
- Sailors’ Memorial Plaque, Fred Olsen's Offices, Oslo
