= Helge Blakkisrud =

Norwegian political scientist and editor

Helge Blakkisrud (born 1967) is a Norwegian political scientist and editor.

Blakkisrud holds an MA in Political Science (1995) from the University of Oslo. He is Head of the Department of Russian and Eurasian Studies at the Norwegian Institute of International Affairs (NUPI).

As of September 2010, he was a visiting scholar at UC Berkeley, working on the project “Non-Recognized States in the Post-Sovjet Area” and with his PhD project on the development of Russian federalism in the period 1991–2008.

Since 1994, he has been Editor-in-Chief of the Scandinavian language of Nordisk Østforum (Nordic Journal of East European and Post-Soviet Studies).
