= Knut Yrvin =

Norwegian software developer (born 1967)

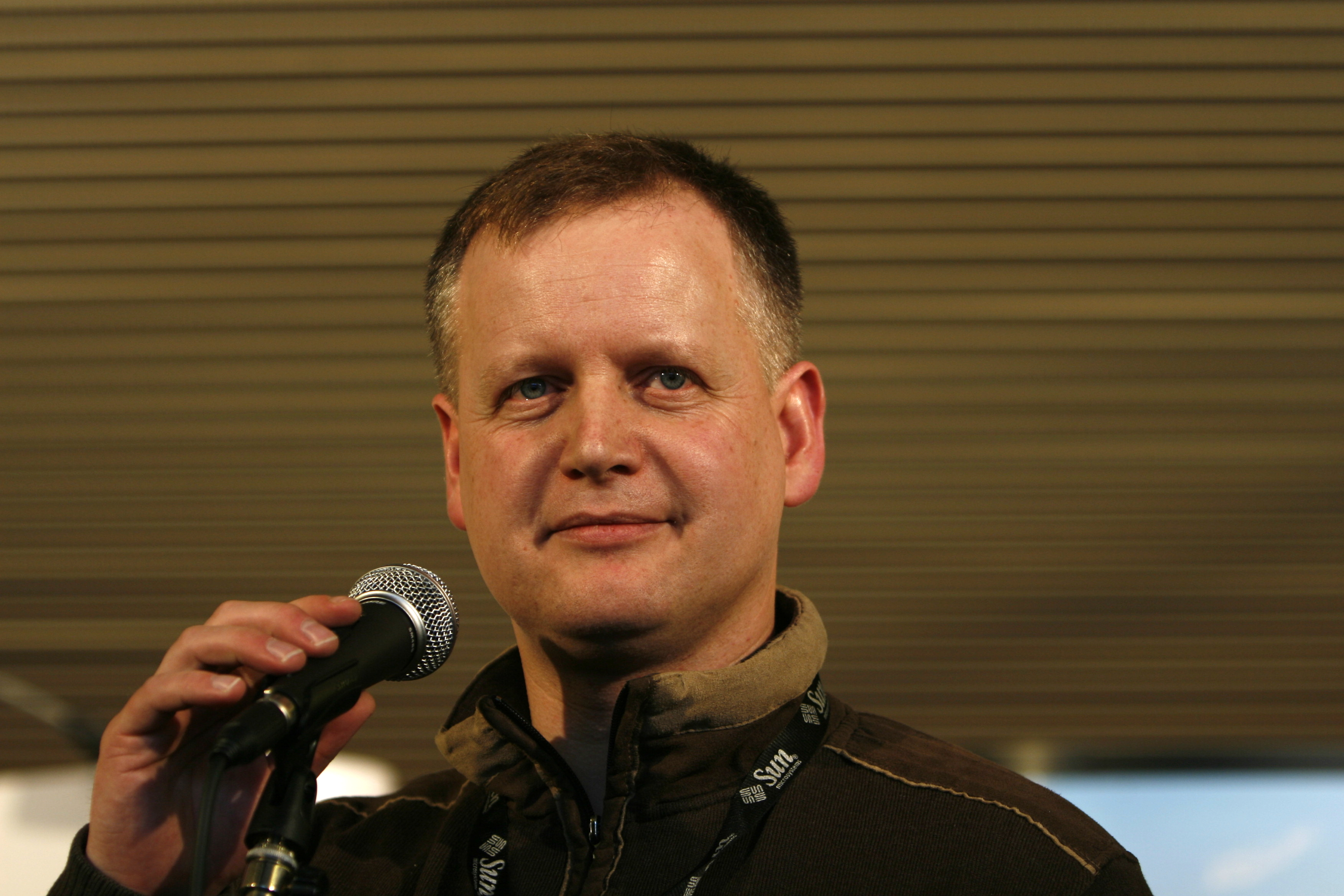
Knut Yrvin, 2008

Knut Yrvin (born March 7, 1967) is a Norwegian software developer. He was an important contributor to the initiation of the Skolelinux project (now DebianEdu). He is also one of the board members of Electronic Frontier Norway, a Norwegian version of Electronic Frontier Foundation.

He has always been one of the most known fighters for free software in Norway.

In 1984 won a Norwegian championship in Break Dance. Yrvin has been active in a number of organizations and teams. From 1998 to 2002, he was leader of the University Labour Party, and since 2002 he has held various board positions in the Hellerud Labour Party and the Alna Labour Party. Since 2000, Yrvin has been on the board of Elektronisk Forpost Norge, and from 2001 he was project manager for the Skolelinux project.

He also took part in Norske Talenter 2010, where he qualified to the final, but did not win.

== See also ==
- Trolltech
- Debian
- Popping
