= Hanne Vataker =

Norwegian sports shooter (born 1967)

Personal information
- Nationality: Norwegian
- Born: 28 May 1967 (age 58); Sandefjord, Norway

Sport
- Country: Norway
- Sport: Sport shooting

Hanne Vataker (born 28 May 1967) is a Norwegian sport shooter. She was born in Sandefjord. She competed at the 1992 Summer Olympics and the 1996 Summer Olympics.
