= Hans Amundsen =

Norwegian journalist and politician

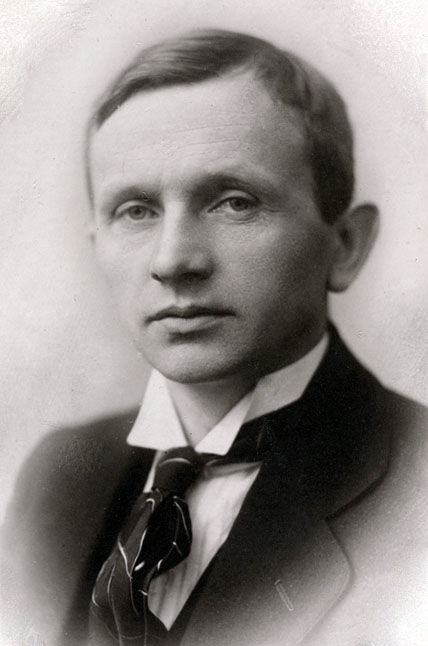
Hans Amundsen around 1930

Hans Amundsen (23 March 1885 – 5 May 1967) was a Norwegian journalist and politician for the Labour and Social Democratic Labour parties.

He was born in Vestre Aker. He was a sub-editor in Fremtiden from 1907 to 1914, journalist in Social-Demokraten from 1914 to 1919, then editor-in-chief of Folket from 1919 to 1921.

In 1921 the Social Democratic Labour Party split from the Labour Party, and Amundsen worked in their main organ Den Nye Social-Demokraten from 1921 to 1927. The party reunited with Labour in 1927, and Amundsen returned to Arbeiderbladet (formerly Social-Demokraten) and spent the rest of his career there.

He was also a local politician, biographer of Christopher Hornsrud (1939) and Trygve Lie (1946), and was a board member of the Norwegian Broadcasting Corporation from 1935 to 1956.
