= Trude Brænne Larssen =

Norwegian novelist (born 1967)

- Born: 1 January 1967 (age 59); Tønsberg
- Occupations: Author, Journalist

Trude Brænne Larssen (born 1 January 1967 in Tønsberg) is a Norwegian novelist. She is the author of the series Holmegaard (11 books), "Ulveøyne" (25 books), and "Rimfrost" (14 books), and has contributed to the series "Emilies Tid". Her earlier books were published on the Egmont Publishing House, but most were published by Cappelen Damm Publishing House.

She has released more than 70 books over two decades.

Trude Brænne Larssen lives in Horten, Norway. She has worked as a journalist for a local newspaper called Gjengangeren since 2009.

== Ulveøyne series ==
Ulveøyne consists of 25 books released between March 1996 and February 2000. A short novel based on part of the second book, Trellfødt (Born To Slavery), was released in August/September 1997. Egmont re-released the series in 2007 after the success of its sequel, Rimfrost.

Ulveøyne means "wolf eyes" and refers to the main character's grey eyes. The eye color is especially catching as Ulva's skin is dark and her hair is black due to her paternal grandmother being from Egypt.

Ulveøyne centers around Ulva, a young slavegirl from Norway. It begins about a year before she's born, and then follows her as she grows up in slavery, then as she's sold at a market, and later kills a man after an attack. She escapes into the mountains and runs into many dangers and difficulties, including being taken in by the "mountain people", a tall, magical people who live inside the mountains. They are also semi-immortal.

=== Audiobooks ===
Cappelen Damm Publishing House began releasing the series as audiobooks in 2020. All books are now available, with narration by Lena Meieran.

== Rimfrost series ==
Rimfrost comprises 14 books, with publication running from early 2007 through March 10, 2008. Rimfrost translates to "white frost," a nod to the protagonist's abnormally white hair. Like her mother, she has grey eyes.

Rimfrost follows Rime, Ulva's only child, and begins about 180 years after Ulveøyne ended. Rime is a healer and survives by the money she earns by helping people. Unlike her mother, Rime was born free, and she does not age because of her father, Arolin's heritage. Her appearance is that of a 19-20-year-old woman with long, snow-white hair.

Arolin's people have 1-3 'gifts' which grant them special abilities. Rime's abilities are healing and the ability to shape rocks however she wants. This includes, but is not limited to, creating better steps and places to hold while climbing, creating a musical fountain, and making large boulders move as if alive.

When the first book begins, she is a widow with several adult children and adult grandchildren. However, because of her semi-immortality, she moves frequently to avoid suspicion.

The 'mountain people' will occasionally have children with human women, and their children will inherit certain abilities, including semi-immortality. The first generation stops aging in their late teens/early twenties (like Rime), the second generation in their 40s, and the third generation in their 60s. Subsequent generations are all human.

=== Audiobooks ===
Cappelen Damm Publishing House began releasing the series as audiobooks in 2022. All audiobooks are available for download and are narrated by Liv-Unni Larsson Undall.

== External References ==
- Author's homepage (in Norwegian)
- Bookshop page (in Norwegian)
- Damm's series (in Norwegian)
- Cappelen Damm's listing of the Ulveøyne audiobooks (in Norwegian)
