= Johann Roppen =

Norwegian professor of media studies (born 1967)

Johann Roppen (born 29 June 1967) is a Norwegian professor of media studies. He was the rector of Volda University College 2015-2023.

== Education and career ==
Roppen was born in Bergen and raised in Flø in Ulstein Municipality. He studied media and mass communications at Møre og Romsdal District University College, now Volda University College, and at the University of Bergen, where he completed his doctorate in 2003 with a thesis on the concentration of media ownership, focussing on Orkla Media. In 2004, he published Medieindustrien, a book which explores the political and economic consequences of this concentration.

Roppen has worked as a journalist at Vikebladet, now Vikebladet Vestposten (1984–87) and served on the national media commissions of both Norway and Denmark (2010, 2011) and the financing committee for the Norwegian Broadcasting Corporation, NRK (2015–16). At Volda University College he has been a faculty member since 1994, was advisor on research and development from 2013 to 2015, then briefly served as communications director before being appointed rector.
