= Oscar Pedersen (politician) =

Norwegian newspaper editor and politician

Oscar Adolf Pedersen (14 September 1885 – 1939) was a Norwegian newspaper editor and politician for the Labour and Social Democratic Labour Labour parties.

He was born in Haugesund. He was a subeditor in Arbeidet in 1908. In 1910 he was tried in the Supreme Court of Norway for conscientious objection. The sentence of 90 days prison was upheld. Later in 1910 he was called in for military service again; objected again and was sentenced to another 90 days. He appealed for pardon, but this was rejected. In 1911 he objected yet again, was sentenced for the third time, but was this time pardoned.

From 1912 to 1919 he managed Arbeidernes Pressekontor. He resigned after being forced to fire a correspondent who was perceived as too rightist by the majority in the Labour Party. Pedersen edited the newspaper Arbeider-Politikken from 1921 to 1923, a newspaper for the right wing in the Labour Party. He was one of the first to suggest that a new party be formed as a split from the Labour Party, and he joined the Social Democratic Labour Party when it was formed in 1921. He represented the party in Oslo city council from 1923 to 1925.

He also edited Riksmålsbladet from 1926 to 1933, as a secretary in the Riksmål Society from 1920. He also chaired the Norwegian Union of Journalists and was a board member of the Norwegian Press Association. He died in 1939.
