= Oddrun Samdal =

Norwegian academic

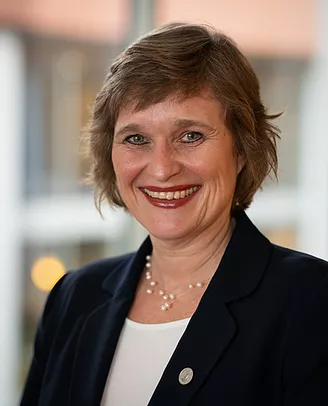
Oddrun Samdal, UiB.

Oddrun Samdal (born 1967 in Bergen, Norway) is Professor in health promotion/health psychology at the University of Bergen. Samdal was the vice-rector for education at the University of Bergen (2013-2017, 2017-2021).

== Academic career ==
Samdal achieved the doctoral degree (dr.philos.) in 1999, and has since then been working at the University of Bergen as post doctor, associate professor and from 2007 full professor at Department of Health Promotion and Development at the Faculty of Psychology.

In her research Oddrun Samdal has taken a special interest in adolescent health and health behaviours. She has done extensive studies of how students’ perceive their work environment at school and how these experiences relate to their reported health behaviours, health and life satisfaction. Similarly she has studied correlates of physical activity in young people.

Oddrun Samdal has volunteered at several occasions to community service at the University of Bergen. During 2004-2005 she was the department chair at the Department of Health and Education that was established the same year. The following year she was asked to become the vise dean of education at the Faculty of Psychology and served in this position until 2009.

== National Community Service ==
Samdal is the chair of UHR Education (Universities Norway) since January 1, 2018.

From 2011-2015, Samdal was the chair of the Norwegian Research Council program board for Public Health and since 2019 the Norwegian Research Council program board for education and competence.

From 1999 to 2004, Samdal was appointed as member of the first national board of physical activity in the Directorate of health under the Ministry of Health. During the same period she was also member of the Child and Family board of the Norwegian national Association of Public Health. Samdal has further served in several evaluation committees for the Directorates of Education and Health.

== International Research Leadership & Management ==
Internationally, Samdal has since 1999 served as Data Manager in the "Health Behaviour in School-aged Children: WHO collaborative Cross-National Survey” (HBSC). Currently more than 40 countries in Europe and North-America participate in the study and Samdal is also the Principal Investigator in Norway. Every fourth year nationally representative data from 11-, 13- and 15-year-olds are collected in all countries. The cleaning and the storage of the data takes place the Databank at the University of Bergen in collaboration with the Norwegian Social Science Data Services. Once the data is put up together, this information is available to external researchers.

In 1993 Samdal was appointed by the Ministry of Health and Ministry of Education to serve as the Norwegian national coordinator of the European network of Health Promoting Schools (now Schools for health in Europe).

Samdal is an experienced workpackage leader in EU projects, currently in the Co-Create project.

Samdal is fluent in English and Spanish and has had long term (6–18 months) research visits at Sydney University (1995) San Diego State University (2001) and University of Valencia (2010–2011).
