= Gunvald Bøe =

Norwegian archivist and historian

Gunvald Bøe (1903/1904 – 21 November 1967) was a Norwegian archivist and historian.

He was hired in the National Archival Services of Norway in 1947, and was promoted to chief archivist of Eastern Norway (including the country's capital Oslo) in 1960. He was also a co-editor of the biographical dictionary Norsk biografisk leksikon from 1961 to his death, succeeding Einar Jansen when he died. His time as co-editor spanned volumes 14, 15 and 16, released between 1962 and 1969 (the latter posthumously).

He died in November 1967, at age 63.
