= Grunde Njøs =

Norwegian speed skater

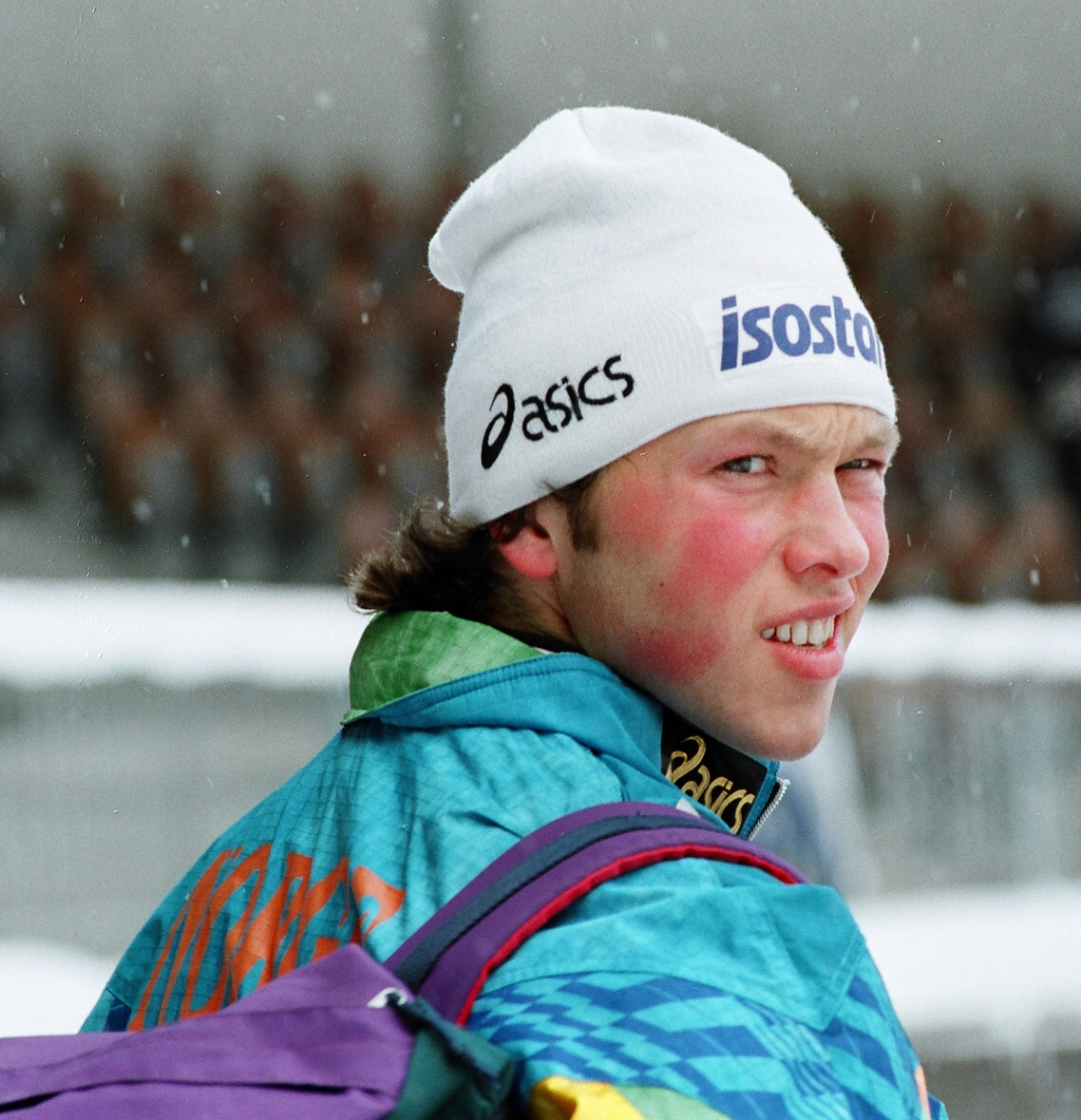
Njøs in Inzell

Grunde Njøs (born 20 June 1967) is a Norwegian speed skater, born in Trondheim. He competed in the 500 m and 1,000 m at the 1994, 1998 and 2002 Winter Olympics.

He was Norwegian champion in sprint in 1992, and again in 1999, and won the Norwegian championships in 500 meters (single distance) five times between 1996 and 2003.
