= Helje Solberg =

Norwegian journalist

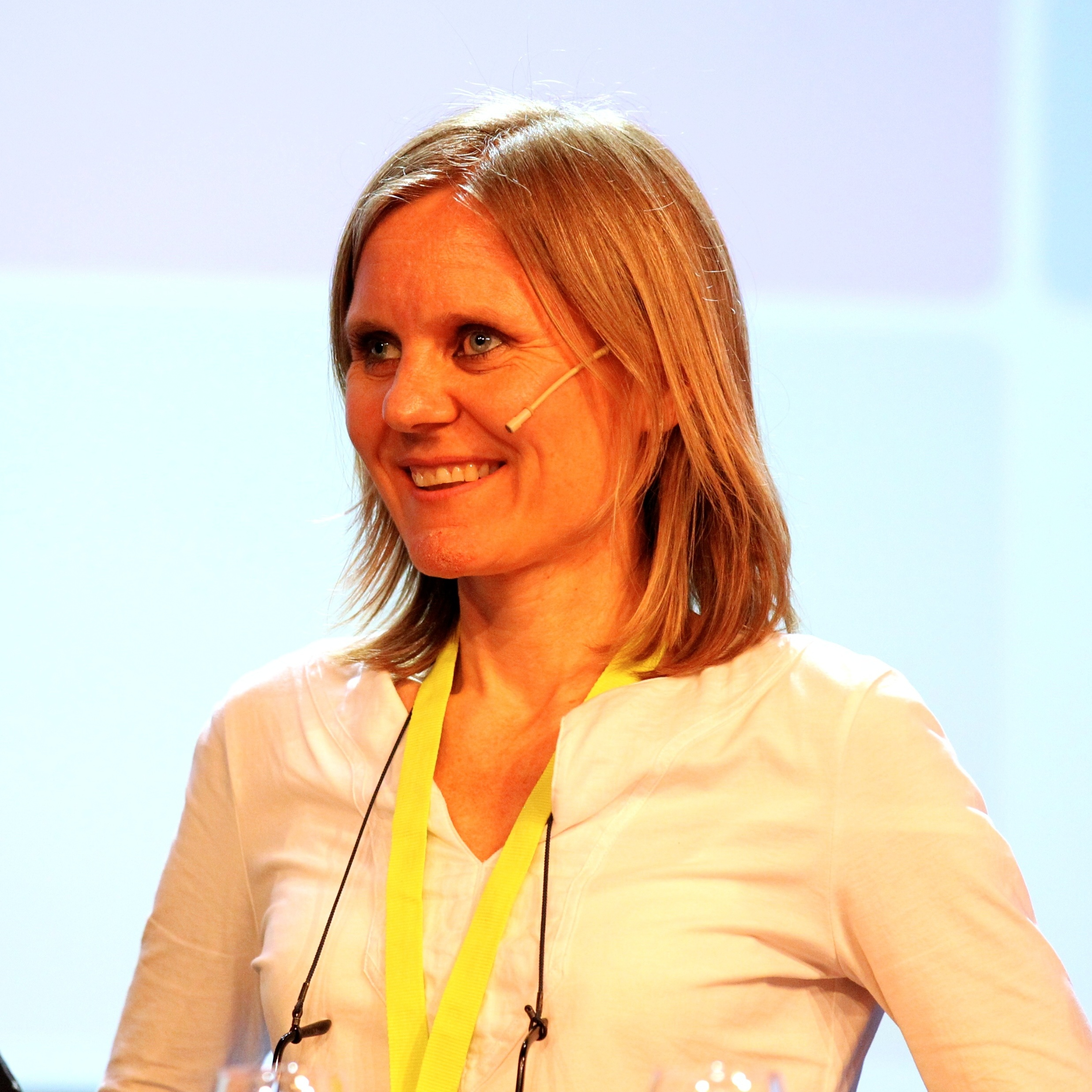
- Born: 7 March 1967 (age 59); Elverum Municipality, Norway
- Education: University of Oslo
- Occupation: Journalist
- Awards: SKUP Award

Helje Solberg (born 7 March 1967) is a Norwegian journalist and media executive. She has been news director in NRK since 2018.

She was awarded the SKUP Award for investigative journalism in 1995.

== Life and career ==
Solberg was born in Elverum Municipality, and graduated as cand.mag. from the University of Oslo in 1993. She has been a journalist for the newspapers Østlendingen, Sør-Varanger Avis, Nationen and Verdens Gang (from 1994). She was appointed editor in Verdens Gang from 2005 to 2014, and editor and director of VGTV from 2014 to 2018. In 2018 she was assigned news director for NRK.

Solberg was awarded the SKUP Award in 1995, for revealing the Workers' Youth League affair through investigative journalism.

Her books include Karen - en historie om alzheimer from 1996. She is a boardmember of the Norwegian Media Businesses' Association from 2013.
