= Carl Gunnar Gundersen =

Norwegian ice hockey player

Personal information
- Born: 1 September 1967 (age 58) Stavanger, Norway

Sport
- Sport: Ice hockey

Carl Gunnar Gundersen (born 1 September 1967) is a Norwegian former ice hockey player. He was born in Stavanger, Norway. He played for the Norwegian national ice hockey team at the 1992 Winter Olympics.
