= Laila Thorsen =

Norwegian politician

Laila Thorsen (born 26 June 1967) is a Norwegian politician for the Labour Party.

She served as a deputy representative to the Parliament of Norway from Rogaland during the term 2009–2013.

She hails from Haugesund Municipality, heads the Norwegian Labour and Welfare Administration office in Vindafjord Municipality and is a board member of the Western Norway Regional Health Authority.
