= Pål Thonstad Sandvik =

Norwegian historian (born 1967)

Pål Thonstad Sandvik (born 1967) is a Norwegian historian and professor of economic history at the Norwegian University of Science and Technology, Trondheim. Sandvik's research has an emphasis on the political economy of the Nordic countries from 1750 to the present. This includes Norwegian and Nordic business history, the regulation of land and natural resources, the relationship between multinational corporations and small countries, and the development of the non-ferrous metal industry during the twentieth century.

Sandvik earned his Master's Degree in history from the University in 1993 and subsequently wrote a number of major works on Norwegian history and on the Falconbridge nickel refinery in Norway. He earned his Ph.D. from NTNU in 2008 on his dissertation The Making of a Subsidiary, Falconbridge Nikkelverk, 1910-1929-2004.

He has published extensively on the history of Norway and the Nordic countries. His contribution to the commission history on the Norwegian aluminum company Norsk Hydro sparked controversy upon publication due to evidence that the company's management collaborated with the German occupying forces during the Second World War. In 2018, the first edition of Sandvik's textbook on Norwegian economic history titled Nasjonens Velstand: Norges økonomiske historie 1800-1940 was published, followed by a revised third edition in 2026. He has also published a number of articles on the regulation of cartels and trusts in Norway, among them the Scandinavian oil industry before the Second World War and the margarine trust Unilever in the interwar years.

Sandvik has led several boards and research projects. He led the National Strategic Unit at Universities Norway, the organization for accredited universities and university colleges in Norway. In the period 2009-2013, Sandvik led the project Beyond Borders: Transnational Movements Through History, financed by the Research Council of Norway, that examined how historical processes have developed across or independent of borders. In the period 2018-2023, he also led the project Regulation of Natural Resources, Global Experiences, 1870-2015 that explored how different countries and international institutions have regulated natural resources between 1870 and 2015.

== Bibliography ==
- Sandvik, P. T. (1994). Mekanisk industri i en europeisk periferi: Fabrikken ved Nidelven 1843-1876. Oslo: Ad Notam Gyldendal. ISBN 72-417-0367-8.
- Sandvik, P. T. (1999). Kristiansands historie 1945-1999. Kristiansand: Sparebanken Pluss. ISBN 82-995157-2-6.
- Sandvik, P. T. & Andresen, E. (2000). Kristiansand energiverk: i elektrisitetens århundre, 1900-2000. Kristiansand: Kristiansand Energiverk. ISBN 82-995715-0-2
- Sandvik, P. T. (2004). Falconbridge Nikkelverk 1910-1929-2000: Et internasjonalt selskap i Norge. Kristiansand: Falconbridge Nikkelverk. ISBN 82-303-0215-4
- Johannessen, F. E., Rønning, A. & Sandvik, P. T. (2005). Nasjonal kontroll og industriell fornyelse, Norsk Hydros historie 1945-1977. Oslo: Pax Forlag. ISBN 978-82-530-2835-4.
- Sandvik, P. T. (2012). Multinationals, Subsidiaries and National Business Systems: The Nickel Industry and Falconbridge Nikkelverk. London: Pickering & Chatto. ISBN 9781848932685.
- Sandvik, P. T. & Storli, E. (2013). Big Business and Small States: Unilever and Norway in the Interwar Years. The Economic History Review, 66(1), 109-131. https://www.jstor.org/stable/42921516
- Sanders, A. D., Sandvik, P. T. & Storli, E. (2019). The Political Economy of Resource Regulation: An International and Comparative History 1850-2015. Vancouver: UBC Press. ISBN 0-7748-6062-6
- Sandvik, P. T. & Storli, E. (2020). The Quest for a Non-Competitive Market: Standard Oil, The International Oil Industry and the Scandinavian States, 1890-1939. The Scandinavian Economic History Review, 68(3), 289-305. https://doi.org/10.1080/03585522.2020.1786448
- Sandvik, P. T. (2026). Nasjonens velstand: Norges økonomiske historie 1800-1940. Bergen: Fagbokforlaget. ISBN 9788245062441
