= H. O. Bergqvist =

Norwegian engineer, businessman and politician

Harry Olaf Bergqvist (4 April 1889 – 3 January 1967) was a Norwegian engineer, businessperson and politician for the Conservative Party.

He was born in Ås, but was raised at Grefsen. In 1915 he moved to Bryn, Oslo. He found work as an engineer in Norsk Gjærde- og Metaldukfabrik, a metal manufacturing company not far from his home. He gradually advanced to become manager of the company. Before Norsk Gjærde- og Metaldukfabrik, he worked for some time in Myrens Verksted.

He was a member of Aker and Oslo municipal councils (Aker was incorporated into Oslo) from 1932 to 1955; for many years in the executive committee. He was a board member of the Oslo branch of the Federation of Mechanical Industries from 1936 to 1940 and Oslo Lysverker, and member of the supervisory council of Akers Sparebank. He was awarded the King's Medal of Merit in 1959. He died in January 1967, and was buried in Østre Aker.
