= Oscar Pedersen (businessman) =

Norwegian industrialist

Oscar Eugen Nicolai Pedersen (6 November 1857 – 5 March 1913) was a Norwegian industrialist.

He was born in Fredrikshald. He attended middle school in Fredrikshald and technical school in Horten, and then studied chemistry at the Dresden University of Applied Sciences. He graduated in 1880, and worked as an engineer and chemist at the Hafslund Chemical Wood Pulp Factory (Norwegian: Hafslund Kemiske Træmassefabrik) from 1883 to 1889. He came in contact with Carl Kellner, and in 1888 Kellner and Edward Partington bought the Borregård farm, acquired rights in Sarp Falls, and established the Kellner-Partington Paper Pulp Co. Ltd. Pedersen was hired as company manager. The company became Borregaard, which Pedersen developed until his relatively early death.

He married Swedish citizen Polly Wennberg (1866–1920) in April 1884. He died in March 1913 near Holmenkollen.
