= Erling Tambs =

Norwegian sailor and writer (1888–1967)

Erling Tambs (May 25, 1888 - January 29, 1967) was a Norwegian writer and sailor.

== Life ==
Erling Tambs married Julie

Erling Tambs was the sixth child of lawyer Victor Emanuel Tambs and his wife Dina Henriette (née Weisert). As a child, he lost his father and a brother: They drowned during a sailing trip. Fifteen-year-old Tambs found work aboard a commercial sailing vessel. After eight years of long-distance voyages, he tried his hand as a secretary, journalist, novelist, and importer in Oslo, but none of these jobs worked out. In 1928 he came up with a plan to sail with his wife Julie (née Jørgensen) on his own ship, the Teddy, a former Norwegian pilot boat. They had to sneak out of the port, because the authorities would not let them sail due to a lack of equipment on the boat. Barely a year after the start, their son Tony was born in the Canary Islands. Six weeks later they started an Atlantic crossing. Via Trinidad and Panama they reached the South Seas. Cocos Island, the Marquesas Islands, and the Society Islands were included in the itinerary. In 1931, their daughter Tui was born in New Zealand. In 1932, after leaving Auckland, Teddy ran into rocks off Little Kawau Island, New Zealand. Tambs cut Tony loose, who was tied to the railing, and jumped onto a headland with his son. Julie was washed overboard and struggled ashore, battered. Tambs also saved Tui. The waves wrecked the ship. When the Cruising Club of America announced an Atlantic regatta in 1935, he wanted to represent his home country. Tambs bought Sandefjord, designed by Colin Archer, and sailed with friends to Newport. In stormy weather, the boat was caught by a huge wave. It capsized. A man drowned. With emergency rigging, they reached their destination. In 1937, Tambs wanted to sail once more in the Pacific Ocean. To fill up the travel coffers, he had to charter the boat to ornithologists, who were exploring the island of Tristan da Cunha. Tambs never set foot on land once, sailing in circles for months or lying in wait for assignments. Sick with scurvy and with the boat in a miserable condition, the Tambs family reached Cape Town, where due to lack of money they had to sell the boat. Erling Tambs died in 1967.

== Ship ==
The Sandefjord was a Norwegian Spitzgatter, a former working boat of the Coast Guard. It is a gaffelgetakelte ketch, the Colin Archer has designed. It was in 1913 Risør built, and had a length oa of 14.36 m, a width of 4.94 m and a draft of 2.44 m, and she wore 82,6 m² sail, motor built Tambs from. On the pitch polling (over-head go) Sandefjord still takes textbooks reference when it comes to the characteristics of the fuselage and tail shapes of sailboats. Among sailors, Colin Archer cracks are not entirely uncontroversial: "Poor Am-wind properties," "too slow", "lack of buoyancy in the stern" arguments to one side, the other praises their "beauty", "the ability without danger in any weather accompanied "and the" good self-control abilities. "Colin Archer Double Ender is a type of yacht, which is already built more than 100 years virtually unchanged, probably unique in this Article The Sandefjord sailed in 1965 for 21 months in the world, and since then the Scandinavian coasts.

== Works ==
- Hard Cruising (Eng. "cruise of Horror" 1979, ISBN 3-922117-05-8)
- The voyage With Teddy (Eng. "honeymoon - but how in the pilot cuts the two seas" 1947)
- Islands of the Blessed (Leipzig 1944)
- The cruise of the Teddy (London 1933)
