= Bertha Bele =

Norwegian politician

Bertha Bele (3 March 1893 – 14 April 1967) was a Norwegian politician for the Labour Party.

She served as a deputy representative to the Parliament of Norway from the Market towns of Møre og Romsdal county during the terms 1945-1949 and 1950–1953. In total she met during 56 days of parliamentary session. She hailed from Ålesund.
