= Cecilie Cottis Østreng =

Norwegian writer (born 1967)

Cecilie Cottis Østreng (born 1967) is a Norwegian lyricist.

Her debut collection Om hvor langt det er til Ullern issued on Tiden (2013) was reviewed in Morgenbladet, Klassekampen, Aftenposten and Stavanger Aftenblad. Her sophomore Mingvasevann (Tiden, 2015) was reviewed in Dagsavisen, Aftenposten and Morgenbladet.

== Works ==
- Om hvor langt det er til Ullern (poetry; "On how far it is to Ullern"). Oslo: Tiden, 2013.
- Mingvasevann (poetry). Oslo: Tiden, 2015.
