= Tonje Skinnarland =

Norwegian major general

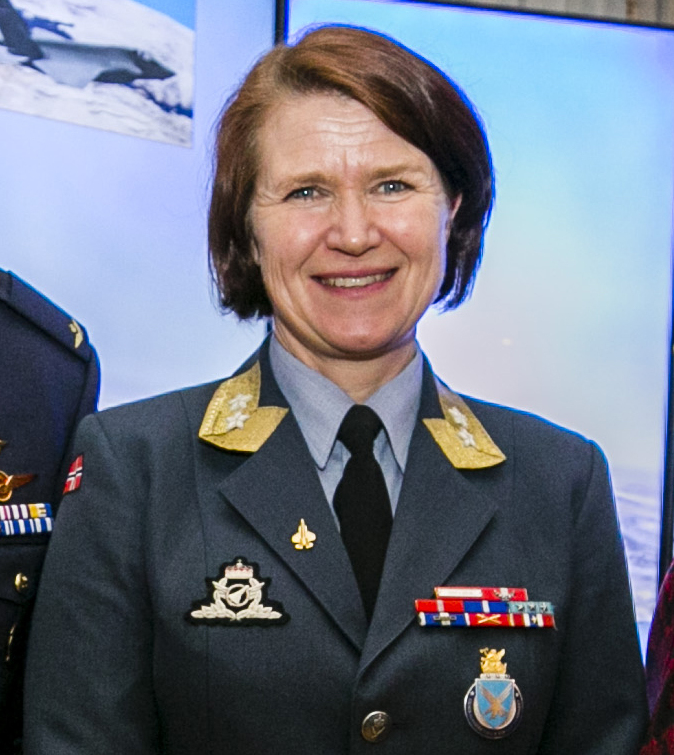
- Tonje Skinnarland in 2019.
- Born: 21 December 1967 (age 58)
- Military career
- Allegiance: Norway
- Branch: Royal Norwegian Air Force
- Rank: Major general

Tonje Skinnarland (born 21 December 1967) is a Norwegian major general who served as Chief of the Royal Norwegian Air Force from 2017 to 2021. In June 2021, she was appointed head of operations in the Defense Staff and took up the position in August of the same year.

In 2016, when she took over as Chief of Staff in the Air Force, she became the first female brigadier of that branch. Following the death of Major General Per-Egil Rygg in 2016, Skinnarland served temporarily in the position of General Inspector of the Air Force, before in February 2017 she was officially appointed to the position, which was now renamed as Chief of the Air Defense. She is the first woman to be the Chief of the Air Force, and the first non-pilot in the Air Force.

Skinnarland attended Forsvarets stabsskole and Forsvarets høgskole, and has been Air Wing Commander 130 Air Wing (Station Commander Air Defense Station Mågerø). From 2014 to 2016, she was aide-de-camp of the Air Force at His Majesty the King.
