= Knut Holte (footballer) =

Norwegian footballer (born 1967)

Personal information
- Date of birth: 25 May 1967 (age 59)
- Position: Defender

Youth career
- –1984: Hamkam

Senior career*
Years	Team	Apps	(Gls)
1985	Cartherud		
1986–1990	Hamkam	75	(0)
1991–1993	Lyn	48	(3)
1994–1996	Stabæk	35	(5)
- * Club domestic league appearances and goals

Knut Holte (born 25 May 1967) is a retired Norwegian footballer who played as a defender. He spent time in Eliteserien for three clubs; Hamkam, Lyn and Stabæk.

== Career ==
He played youth football for Hamarkameratene. At the age of 17, he felt that he lacked the opportunity to reach the first team, and moved to the local minnows Cartherud FF to start his senior career. Owing to good development throughout 1985, he was allowed to return to Hamkam and join the first team in 1986. He was tipped to get his breakthrough in 1987. While he did play more, Hamkam was eventually relegated from the 1987 top league.

Holte remained in Hamkam throughout 1990. At the end of his spell in Hamkam, Holte took mercantile education in Oslo and commuted for training and matches. He therefore chose to leave Hamkam after the 1990 season and sign for SFK Lyn. From 1991 to 1993, he played 48 Norwegian Premier League games and scored 4 goals for Lyn. In June 1992 he was hastily selected for the Norway national football team as a replacement for Tore Pedersen who fell ill. Holte spent the match against Scotland on the bench.

In 1994 he joined Stabæk, newly promoted to the second tier. According to the local newspaper Asker og Bærums Budstikke, Holte was "by far" their best player during the 1994 season. In the newspaper's grading system, Holte scored 4.4 out of 6 on average. Stabæk also won promotion to Eliteserien for the first time ever. Hamkam wanted Holte to return there, but this did not go through.

He played 35 league games and scored 5 goals for Stabæk. In June 1995 he had to undergo achilles tendon surgery, first one and then the other achilles tendon after the season. He was still in the Stabæk squad for the 1996 season, but was said to have "gambled" when trying to resume to Stabæk's training sessions, and in March 1996 he was ruled out for a couple of months. Holte now stated that he would retire if he still suffered from painful heels by April. He was able to play for Stabæk's B team in May, but it was strenuous. In June 1996 he decided to retire from football with immediate effect.

== Post-playing career ==
Knut Holte worked for Scandinavian Property Group (SPG) and became a successful real estate investor. In 2014, he helped save Hamkam's senior team when agreeing to be a guarantor for a bank loan. In 2019, he moved back to Hamar with his family, entering a position as one of the most wealthy persons in the city.
