= Finn Kristensen =

Norwegian politician

Minister of Petroleum and Energy
- In office 3 November 1990 – 31 December 1992
- Prime Minister: Gro Harlem Brundtland
- Preceded by: Eivind Reiten
- Succeeded by: Grete Faremo (1996)

Minister of Industry
- In office 4 February 1981 – 14 October 1981
- Prime Minister: Gro Harlem Brundtland
- Preceded by: Lars Skytøen
- Succeeded by: Jens-Halvard Bratz
- In office 9 May 1986 – 31 December 1987
- Prime Minister: Gro Harlem Brundtland
- Preceded by: Petter Thomassen
- Succeeded by: Position abolished
- In office 1 January 1988 – 16 October 1989
- Prime Minister: Gro Harlem Brundtland
- Preceded by: Position established
- Succeeded by: Petter Thomassen
- In office 4 September 1992 – 7 October 1993
- Prime Minister: Gro Harlem Brundtland
- Preceded by: Ole Knapp
- Succeeded by: Jens Stoltenberg

Member of the Norwegian Parliament
- In office 1 October 1969 – 30 September 1985
- Constituency: Telemark

Personal details
- Born: 24 July 1936 (age 90) Brevik, Telemark, Norway
- Party: Labour

Finn Kristensen (born 24 July, 1936) is a Norwegian electrician, trade unionist, and politician affiliated with the Labour Party. He served as Minister of Industry in 1981, from 1986 to1988, and from 1992 to 1993. Additionally, he was the Minister of Petroleum and Energy from 1990 to 1992. Kristensen represented Telemark as a Member of Parliament from 1969 to 1985.

Born in Brevik, he was the son of welder Bjarne Kornelius Kristensen (1912–1946) and cleaner Jenny Therese Eikefjord (1914–1989). kristensen began his basic training as an electrician in 1950, starting an apprenticeship at Dalen Portland Cementfabrikk. After completing his four-year apprenticeship, he spent a year studying strong current at the Oslo School of Elementary Technics. He then worked at sea for a year before returning to Dalen Portland, where he worked from 1958 to 1962.

== Political career ==
He started a political career in the municipal councils of Eidanger Municipality and Porsgrunn Municipality from 1959 to 1971. In 1962 he was hired as an instructor in Arbeidernes Opplysningsforbund, where he remained three years. During the same period he was a supervisory council member in the Norwegian Confederation of Trade Unions. In 1965 he was hired as a county secretary for Telemark Labour Party. He was also elected as a deputy representative to the Parliament of Norway from Telemark in 1965, and was subsequently elected to four full terms in 1969, 1973, 1977 and 1981.

In 1981 Kristensen served as Minister of Industry in the brief Brundtland's First Cabinet. His parliamentary seat was filled by Dagfinn Øksenholt and Einfrid Halvorsen. When Brundtland's Second Cabinet assumed office in 1986, Kristensen became Minister of Industry and served until the cabinet fell in 1989 (from 1988 the post was called Minister of Trade and Industry). When Brundtland's Second Cabinet assumed office in 1990, Kristensen became Minister of Petroleum and Energy. He also became head of the Ministry of Trade in September 1992, overseeing a merger with the Ministry of Petroleum and Energy to create the Ministry of Trade and Energy. Kristensen headed this ministry until October 1993.

In between his governmental jobs, Kristensen was the director of T-invest in Notodden Municipality from 1985 to 1986, then a director in Statoil from 1989 to 1990. From 1994 to 2007 he led his own company, F.K. Bedriftsutvikling. He was also a senior adviser in ABB until 1997.

Kristensen chaired Telemark Labour Party from 1972 to 1977, and was a national board member of the Labour Party from 1977 to 1981. He was a deputy board member of the Norwegian Labour Inspection Authority from 1974 to 1979 and Næringsøkonomisk institutt in 1980.

Political offices
Preceded by Lars Skytøen	Minister of Industry; 1981	Succeeded by Jens-Halvard Bratz
Preceded by Petter Thomassen	Minister of Industry; 1986–1989	Succeeded by Petter Thomassen
Preceded by Eivind Reiten	Norwegian Minister of Petroleum and Energy; 1990–1992	Succeeded by none
Preceded by Ole Knapp	Minister of Industry and Trade; 1992–1993	Succeeded by Jens Stoltenberg
