= Eivind Reiten =

Norwegian politician

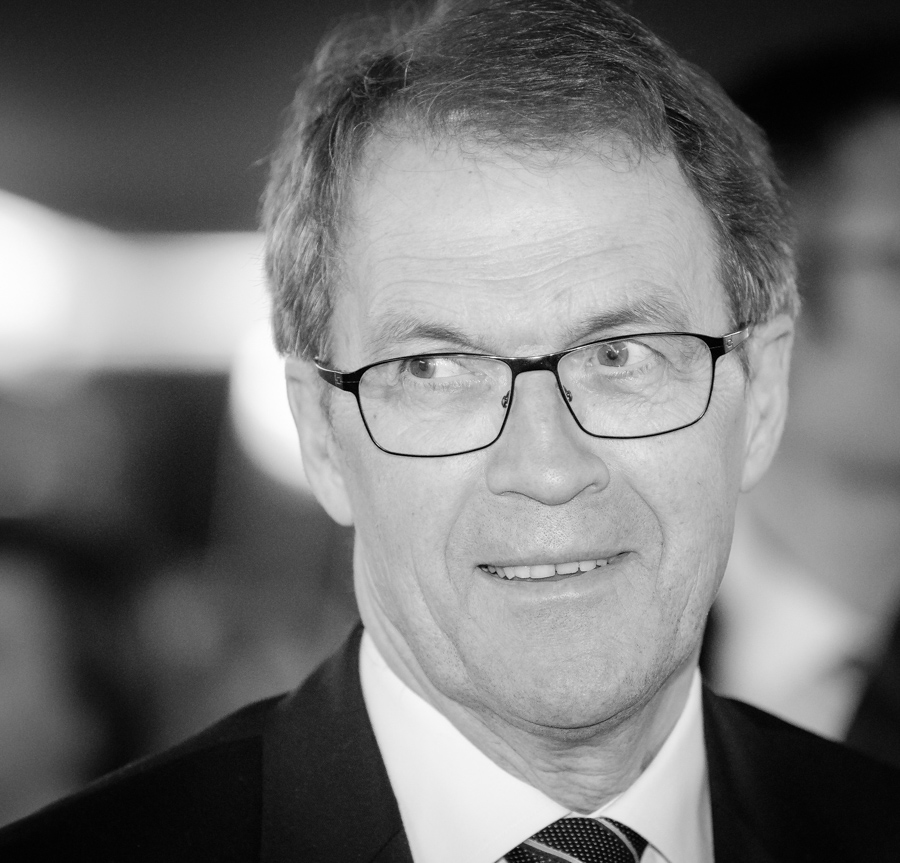
- Reiten in 2018

Director General of Norsk Hydro
- In office 2001 – 30 March 2009
- Preceded by: Egil Myklebust
- Succeeded by: Svein Richard Brandtzæg

Minister of Petroleum and Energy
- In office 16 October 1989 – 3 November 1990
- Prime Minister: Jan P. Syse
- Preceded by: Arne Øien
- Succeeded by: Finn Kristensen

Minister of Fisheries
- In office 4 October 1985 – 9 May 1986
- Prime Minister: Kåre Willoch
- Preceded by: Thor Listau
- Succeeded by: Bjarne Mørk-Eidem

State Secretary for the Ministry of Finance
- In office 17 June 1983 – 4 October 1985
- Prime Minister: Kåre Willoch
- Minister: Rolf Presthus

Personal details
- Born: Eivind Kristofer Reiten; 2 April 1953 (age 73) Midsund Municipality, Norway
- Party: Centre

Eivind Kristofer Reiten (born 2 April 1953) is a Norwegian economist, corporate officer and politician for the Centre Party. He served as Minister of Fisheries from 1985-1986 and Minister of Petroleum and Energy from 1989-1990, before entering a career in business. Reiten served as the Director General (CEO) of Norsk Hydro between 2001 and 2009, after which he took up the chairmanship of Norske Skog. Eivind Reiten was also Chairman of StatoilHydro for four days until he resigned from his position after Norsk Hydro had been accused of corruption.

== Political career ==
Reiten was born in Midsund Municipality as the son of Kristofer Reiten, a farmer and fisher, and housewife Kjellaug Opstad. He enrolled as a student in 1972, and graduated from the University of Oslo in 1978 with a degree in economics. He worked as a civil servant from 1979 to 1982, and as a secretary for the Centre Party from 1982 to 1983. He was then brought into the government as state secretary to the Minister of Finance from 1983 to 1985. He then became Minister of Fisheries from 1985 to 1986 as part of the Second cabinet Willoch, and Minister of Petroleum and Energy from 1989 to 1990 as part of Cabinet Syse. In his last political position, he was responsible for the deregulation of the electricity market in Norway. Having chaired the Centre Youth, the youth wing of the Centre Party, from 1979 to 1981, he served as a deputy representative to the Norwegian Parliament from 1985 to 1989.

== Business career ==
Reiten started working for Norsk Hydro in 1988, heading the energy division from that year, and becoming senior vice president of special projects in 1991. From 1992 he led the refining and marketing division, and from 1998 the aluminum division. He was appointed executive vice president for light metals in 1999. He succeeded Egil Myklebust as chief executive officer in 2001. He was a member of the board of the Bank of Norway from 1991 to 1994 and Norske Skogindustrier from 1997 to 2000, and has chaired the board of Norway Post (1996–1999) and Telenor (2000–2001). He has attended the Bilderberg meetings. He is a fellow of the Norwegian Academy of Technological Sciences. In 2017, he was appointed chairman of Kongsberg Gruppen.

=== Libya corruption case ===
As part of the merger between Statoil and the oil and gas division of Norsk Hydro, Reiten was appointed chair of the merged StatoilHydro that merged on 1 October 2007. Four days later Reiten withdrew from the seat. The reason was that it was uncertain whether or not he knew about a corruption case Hydro had been accused of, where a Libyan consulting company and the consultant Abdurrazag Gammudi had been paid 60 million kr, used to make bribes, after the Hydro take-over of Saga Petroleum in 1999. Stated Reiten, it was in no-one's interest that he retain a conflict of interest by retaining the seat of chair in the company that would investigate himself. The case had arisen on 26 September, after a Hydro employee had leaked information about the matter; it had not been identified as part of the due diligence performed by Statoil prior to the merger. He was replaced by his deputy, Marit Arnstad, who is also a former Minister of Petroleum and Energy from the Centre Party. The investigation from StatoilHydro concluded that Reiten was informed about this during 2000 and 2001, while the investigation in Norsk Hydro concluded that Reiten did not know about the corruption. Since the Norsk Hydro investigation—that included checking 1.5 million documents—could not show that Reiten knew about the corruption, Hydro Chairman Terje Vareberg confirmed that Reiten would not be removed from his position. However, two executives of StatoilHydro were required to leave immediately.

=== Leaving Norsk Hydro ===
In January 2009 Reiten announced that he was stepping down as Chief Executive of Norsk Hydro from 30 March 2009, with executive vice president Svein Richard Brandtzæg taking over. Reiten has since been nominated to replace Kim Wahl as Chairman of Norske Skog at the company's annual general meeting in April 2009.

== Personal life ==
Reiten is married and has two children. He resides in Oslo.

Political offices
Preceded by Thor Listau	Norwegian Minister of Fisheries and Coastal Affairs; 1985–1986	Succeeded by Bjarne Mørk Eidem
Preceded by Arne Øien	Norwegian Minister of Petroleum and Energy; 1989–1990	Succeeded by Finn Kristensen
Business positions
Preceded by Egil Myklebust	Director General of Norsk Hydro; 2001–2009	Succeeded by Svein Richard Brandtzæg
