= Mauritzen =

Mauritzen is a Danish and Norwegian surname. Notable people with the surname include:

- Barbara Mauritzen (c.1925–2011), British cryptographer
- Birger Mauritzen (born 1949), Danish footballer
- Cecilie Mauritzen (born 1961), Norwegian oceanographer
- Sverre Mauritzen (born 1943), Norwegian diplomat and politician
