= Skulberg =

Skulberg is a Norwegian surname. Notable people with the surname include:

- Anton Skulberg (1921–2012), Norwegian scientist and politician
- Per Kristian Skulberg (born 1951), Norwegian physician and politician
