= Vidkun =

Vidkun or Vidkunn is a given name. Notable people with the name include:

- Vidkun Quisling (1887–1945), Norwegian military officer and politician
- Vidkunn Hveding (1921–2001), Norwegian politician
- Vidkunn Nitter Schreiner, editor of Bergens Tidende, 1942–1945
