= Nordrum =

Nordrum is a Norwegian surname. Notable people with the surname include:

- Herbert Nordrum (born 1987), Norwegian actor
- Amy Nordrum (born 1987), American journalist and executive editor of operations at MIT Tech Review
- Lars Nordrum (1921–1973), Norwegian actor
- Siv Nordrum (1958–2021), Norwegian journalist and politician
