= Petter Thomassen =

Norwegian politician

Minister of Trade
- In office 16 October 1989 – 3 November 1990
- Prime Minister: Jan P. Syse
- Preceded by: Finn Kristensen
- Succeeded by: Ole Knapp

Minister of Industry
- In office 4 October 1985 – 9 May 1986
- Prime Minister: Kåre Willoch
- Preceded by: Jan P. Syse
- Succeeded by: Finn Kristensen

Second Deputy Leader of the Conservative Party
- In office 22 January 1988 – 5 May 1990
- Leader: Jan P. Syse
- Preceded by: Erlend Rian
- Succeeded by: Svein Ludvigsen

Member of the Norwegian Parliament
- In office 1 October 1977 – 30 September 1997
- Constituency: Nordland

Personal details
- Born: Petter Johan Thomassen; 17 April 1941 Salangen, Reichskommissariat Norwegen (today Norway)
- Died: 8 October 2003 (aged 62) Oslo, Norway
- Party: Conservative

Petter Johan Thomassen (17 April 1941 – 8 October 2003) was a Norwegian politician for the Conservative Party.

== Early years ==
He was born in Salangen Municipality as a son of farmers Karl Thomassen (1905–1978) and Johanna, née Grimstad (1914–1996). He finished his secondary education in Trondheim in 1960, and took the siv.øk. degree in Copenhagen in 1963. He was the manager of Nordlandsdata in Bodø from 1965 to 1976.

== Career ==
He was a member of the municipal council of Bodø Municipality from 1967 to 1975. He was also a member of Nordland county council. From 1976 to 1977 he was chairman (fylkesrådsleder) of Nordland's county cabinet. In his party he was a central board member of the Norwegian Young Conservatives from 1969 to 1971, and central board member of the Conservative Party from 1976 to 1990. From 1988 to 1990 he was the second deputy leader of his party.

He was elected to the Parliament of Norway from Nordland in 1977, and was re-elected on four occasions; in 1981, 1985, 1989 and 1993. He chaired one Standing Committee during his time, the Standing Committee on Finance from 1983 to 1985. He had previously served as a deputy representative during the term 1969–1973. From 1985 to 1986, while Willoch's Second Cabinet held office, Thomassen served as the Minister of Industry. During this period his seat in parliament was taken by Harry Danielsen. From 1989 to 1990 Thomassen served as Minister of Trade in Syse's Cabinet. During this period his seat in parliament was taken by Steinar Høgaas.

He chaired Nordland District College (1976 to 1978), Dataringen (1971 to 1973, board member 1968 to 1976), Nordlandsforskning (1980 to 1985, 1986 to 1988), Polarsirkelsenteret (1988 to 1990), Norsk Luftfartssenter (1994 to 1998), Polar Park (1994 to 2001), Bodø Energi (1996 to 2003), Nordland Teater (1999 to 2003) and Store Norske Spitsbergen Kulkompani (2003). He was a board member of Norske datasentralers landsforbund (1972 to 1974) and the Norwegian Electricity Industry Association (1998 to 2003). He authored numerous books.

Political offices
Preceded by Jan P. Syse	Norwegian Minister of Industry; 1985–1986	Succeeded by Finn Kristensen
Preceded by Finn Kristensen	Norwegian Minister of Trade; 1989–1990	Succeeded by Ole Knapp
