= Bjartmar Gjerde =

Norwegian politician (1931–2009)

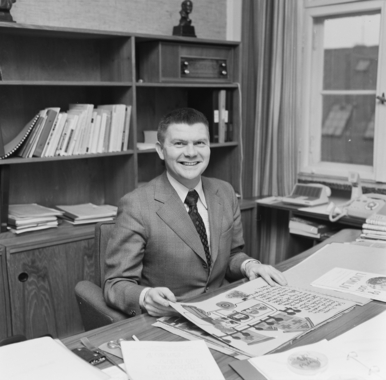
- Gjerde in 1973.

Minister of Petroleum and Energy
- In office 11 January 1978 – 3 October 1980
- Prime Minister: Odvar Nordli
- Preceded by: Position established
- Succeeded by: Arvid Johanson

Minister of Industry
- In office 15 January 1976 – 11 January 1978
- Prime Minister: Odvar Nordli
- Preceded by: Ingvald Ulveseth
- Succeeded by: Olav Haukvik

Minister of Education and Church Affairs
- In office 16 October 1973 – 15 January 1976
- Prime Minister: Trygve Bratteli
- Preceded by: Anton Skulberg
- Succeeded by: Kjølv Egeland
- In office 17 March 1971 – 18 October 1972
- Prime Minister: Trygve Bratteli
- Preceded by: Kjell Bondevik
- Succeeded by: Anton Skulberg

Minister of Nordic Cooperation
- In office 16 October 1973 – 3 October 1980
- Prime Minister: Trygve Bratteli; Odvar Nordli
- Preceded by: Hallvard Eika
- Succeeded by: Rolf Hansen

Personal details
- Born: Bjartmar Alv Gjerde; 6 November 1931 Sande Municipality, Norway
- Died: 28 November 2009 (aged 78)
- Party: Labour
- Spouse: Anne Karin Hoel (m. 1954)

Bjartmar Alv Gjerde (6 November 1931 – 28 November 2009) was a Norwegian politician for the Labour Party. He held several posts as a government minister between 1971 and 1980, and was Norway's first Minister of Petroleum and Energy. He was later the director-general of the Norwegian Broadcasting Corporation and director of the government agency Aetat.

== Early life and career ==
Hailing from Larsnes in Sande Municipality, he was a son of smallholder Hjalmar Gjerde (1902–1979) and housewife Astrid Øvrelid (1907–1993). In his younger days he worked as a journalist, first in Sunnmøre Arbeideravis from 1948 to 1953 and then as editor-in-chief of Fritt Slag from 1953 to 1958. His only education beyond primary school was Sørmarka Folk High School in 1950. He also served in the Independent Norwegian Brigade Group in Germany. A newspaper article about alcohol drinking among brigade group officers in 1947 cost him fifteen days in military prison.

== National politics ==
Gjerde was the chairman of Workers' Youth League from 1958 to 1961. From 1961 to 1962 he worked as a secretary for the Labour Party's parliamentary group, and from 1963 he worked as chief secretary in Arbeidernes Opplysningsforbund. He remained in this position—with interruptions—until 1981, and rejected offers to become both party secretary in 1969 and editor-in-chief of Arbeiderbladet in 1975.

As an elected politician he served as a deputy representative to the Parliament of Norway from Oslo during the term 1965–1969. He chaired Oslo's city chapter of the Labour Party from 1969 to 1972, and was a member of the central committee of the Labour Party from 1972 to 1981. During Trygve Bratteli's First and Second Cabinet, from 1972 to 1972 and 1973 to 1976, Gjerde was appointed as Minister of Education and Church Affairs. In Nordli's Cabinet he was given the Minister of Industry post, which he held until 11 January 1978 when he left to become the first Minister of Petroleum and Energy in Norway. He held the latter position until October 1980, when Arvid Johanson replaced him. His time was marked by several extraordinary incidents, including the Alta controversy and the Alexander Kielland rig disaster.

== Later career ==
Gjerde was later director-general of the Norwegian Broadcasting Corporation from 1981 to 1989. From 1989 to 1995 he was director of Aetat (now a part of the Norwegian Labour and Welfare Service). He was a member of the Arts Council Norway from 1965 to 1985, and a board member of the Regional Development Fund from 1989 to 1992.

Party political offices
Preceded by Reidar Hirsti	Chairman of the Workers' Youth League; 1958–1961	Succeeded by Reiulf Steen
Political offices
Preceded by Kjell Bondevik	Norwegian Minister of Church and Education Affairs; 1971–1972	Succeeded by Anton Skulberg
Preceded by Anton Skulberg	Norwegian Minister of Church and Education Affairs; 1973–1976	Succeeded by Kjølv Egeland
Preceded by Ingvald Ulveseth	Norwegian Minister of Industry; 1976–1978	Succeeded by Olav Haukvik
New ministerial post	Norwegian Minister of Petroleum and Energy; 1978–1980	Succeeded by Arvid Johanson
Media offices
Preceded by Torolf Elster	Director-General of the Norwegian Broadcasting Corporation; 1981–1989	Succeeded by Einar Førde
Civic offices
Preceded by Kjell Stahl	Director of Aetat; 1989–1995	Succeeded by Ted Hanisch
