= Kjølv Egeland =

Norwegian politician

Minister of Education and Church Affairs
- In office 15 January 1976 – 8 October 1979
- Prime Minister: Odvar Nordli
- Preceded by: Bjartmar Gjerde
- Succeeded by: Einar Førde

Personal details
- Born: 8 September 1918 Haugesund, Rogaland, Norway
- Died: 30 December 1999 (aged 81) Stavanger, Rogaland, Norway
- Party: Labour
- Spouse: Margot Kristiane Rosenvinge Sunde (m. 1945)
- Children: Jan Egeland

Kjølv Egeland (8 September 1918 – 30 December 1999) was a Norwegian politician for the Labour Party. He was Minister of Education and Church Affairs 1976–1979.

He is the father of Jan Egeland (born 1957), former United Nations Undersecretary-General for Humanitarian Affairs and Emergency Relief Coordinator.
