= Christian Syse =

Norwegian civil servant and diplomat

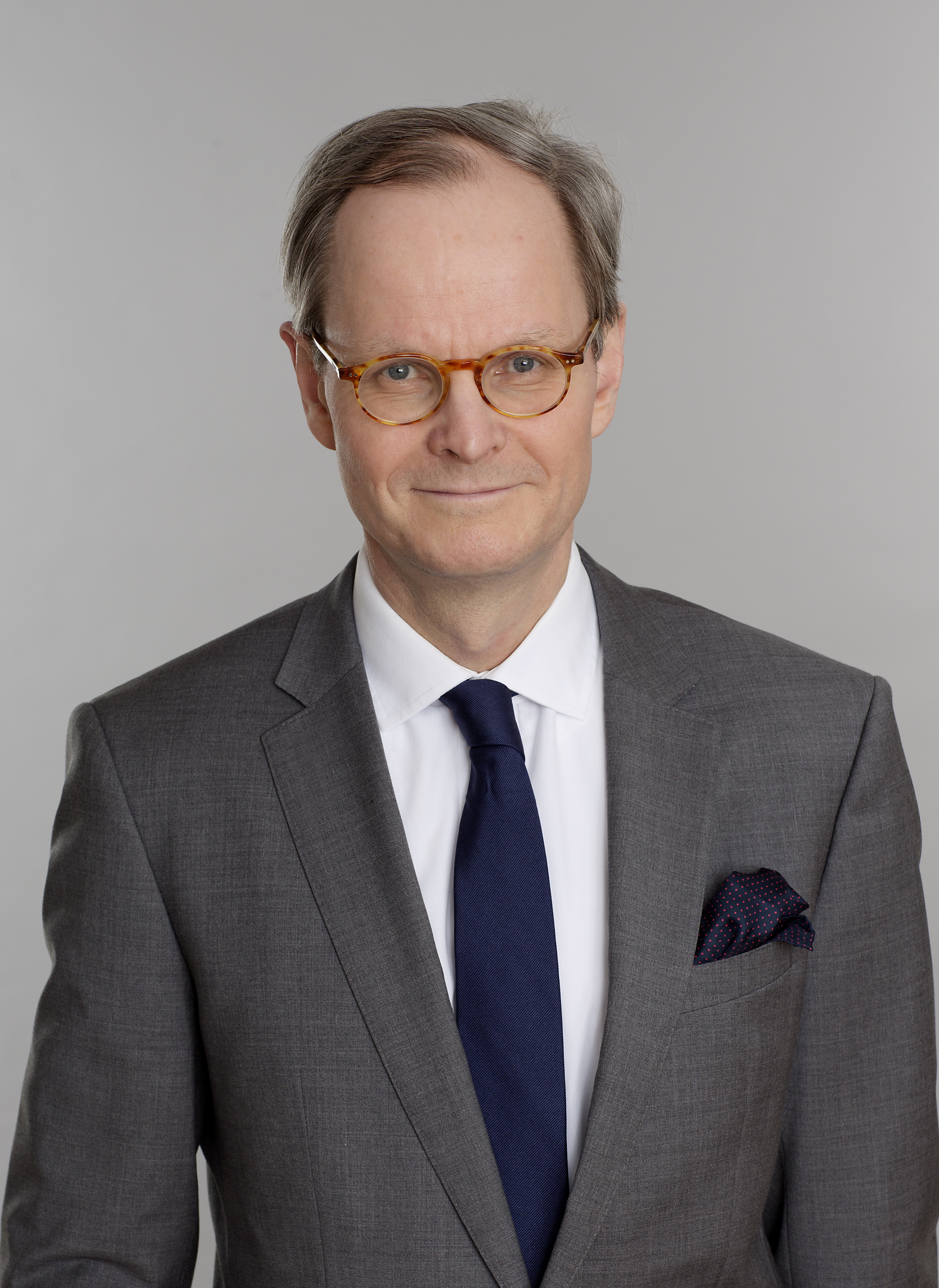
- Born: 30 September 1962 (age 63)
- Education: Norwegian School of Economics; Yale University
- Occupations: Civil servant and diplomat
- Spouse: Siv Nordrum
- Father: Jan P. Syse
- Relatives: Henrik Syse (brother)

Christian Syse (born 30 September 1962) is a Norwegian civil servant and diplomat.

He is the son of Else and former prime minister of Norway Jan P. Syse and a brother of Henrik Syse. He was educated at the Norwegian School of Economics and at Yale University.

Syse served at the Office of the Prime Minister from 1998 to 2003 and then as head of the international department and secretary to the Standing Committee on Foreign Affairs of the Norwegian parliament. From 2008 to 2011 he was director general (ekspedisjonssjef) for European affairs and trade policy in the Ministry of Foreign Affairs and from 2011 deputy secretary general (assisterende utenriksråd) of the Foreign service.

He served as ambassador and head of the Norwegian embassy in Stockholm, 2017-2021. He was subsequently the MFA special representative for Ukraine and is since August 2026 Norway's ambassador to the OECD and international organizations in Paris.

Syse was married to Siv Nordrum, a journalist, communications director and politician. She died in April 2021 after a brief illness.
