= Arne Øien =

Norwegian economist and politician

Minister of Petroleum and Energy
- In office 9 May 1986 – 16 October 1989
- Prime Minister: Gro Harlem Brundtland
- Preceded by: Kåre Kristiansen
- Succeeded by: Eivind Reiten

State Secretary at the Office of the Prime Minister
- In office 4 February 1981 – 14 October 1981
- Prime Minister: Gro Harlem Brundtland
- Preceded by: Olav Bucher-Johannessen
- Succeeded by: Kai Eide

Personal details
- Born: 22 December 1928 Oslo, Norway
- Died: 5 October 1998 (aged 69)
- Party: Labour
- Spouse: Gerd Irene Aronsen (m. 1955)

Arne Øien (22 December 1928 – 5 October 1998) was a Norwegian economist and politician for the Labour Party. He was Minister of Petroleum and Energy from 1986 to 1989.

He was born in Oslo and graduated as cand.oecon. in 1954. He worked in Statistics Norway from 1955 to 1970, and was hired as a deputy under-secretary of state in the Ministry of Finance in 1971. He kept this job until 1978, when he became advisor of economical matters. From 1980 to 1990 he was the director of Statistics Norway. He was then permanent under-secretary of state in the Ministry of Finance (finansråd) from 1990 to 1995.

Having a parallel career in politics, he was a State Secretary in the Office of the Prime Minister in 1981 under the first cabinet Brundtland. When the second cabinet Brundtland was formed in 1986, Øien was brought in as Minister of Petroleum and Energy. He lost the job when the second cabinet Brundtland fell following the 1989 election.

Øien was a member of the board of Arbeiderbladet from 1981 to 1986 and Oslo Sporveier from 1996 to his death, the last two years as deputy board chairman.

Political offices
Preceded by Kåre Kristiansen	Norwegian Minister of Petroleum and Energy; 1986–1989	Succeeded by Eivind Reiten
Civic offices
Preceded by Tormod Hermansen	Permanent under-secretary of state in the Norwegian Ministry of Finance; 1991–1996	Succeeded by Svein Gjedrem
