= Egil Myklebust =

Norwegian businessperson and lawyer (born 1942)

Egil Myklebust (born 9 June 1942) is a Norwegian businessperson and lawyer. Since 2001 he has been chairman of the board of SAS Group.

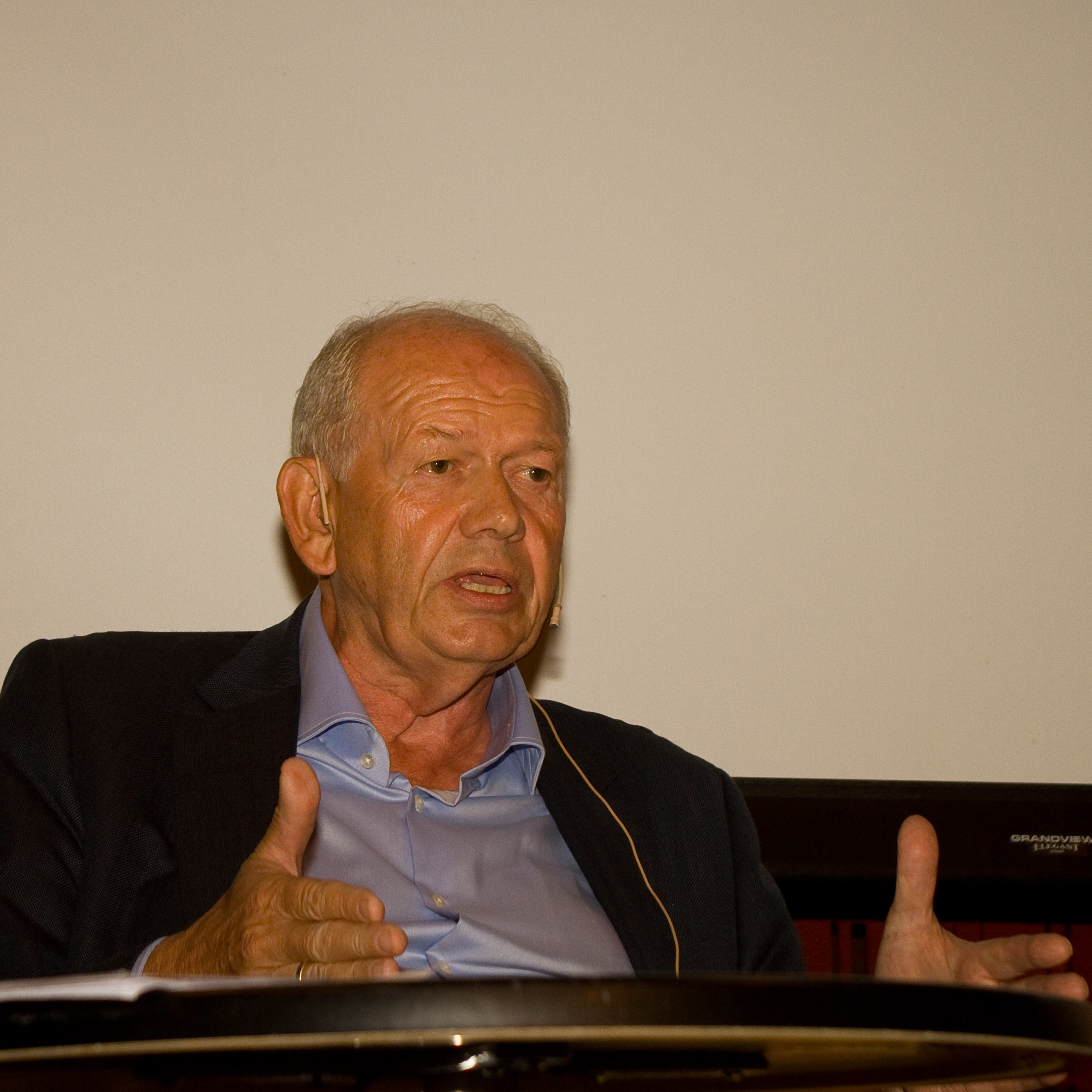
Egil Myklebust

Born in Kvinnherad Municipality, Myklebust took a law degree from the University of Oslo in 1967, before starting work with the Norwegian Welfare Services (1968 to 1971). After that he worked at Norsk Hydro from 1971 to 2001, the ten last as chief executive officer. After he retired of CEO of Norsk Hydro he took over as chairman of the board of Norsk Hydro (until 2004) and SAS Group, as well as deputy board chairman of Norske Skog.

He was also CEO of the Norwegian Employers' Confederation (NAF) from 1987 to 1989, and then of the Confederation of Norwegian Enterprise until 1990, overseeing the 1989 merger. He is a former member of the Steering Committee of the Bilderberg Group.

He is a fellow of the Norwegian Academy of Technological Sciences.

Business positions
Preceded by Pål Kraby	CEO of the Confederation of Norwegian Enterprise; 1987–1990	Succeeded by
Preceded by Torvild Aakvaag	Director General of Norsk Hydro; 1991–2001	Succeeded by Eivind Reiten
