= Einar Brusevold =

Norwegian politician (1919–2005)

- Born: 24 May 1919; Varteig, Norway
- Died: 20 May 2005 (aged 85)
- Occupation: Politician
- Awards: King's Medal of Merit in silver

Einar Brusevold (24 May 1919 – 20 May 2005) was a Norwegian politician.

He was elected deputy representative to the Storting for the period 1969–1973 for the Centre Party. He replaced Anton Skulberg at the Storting from October 1972 to September 1973.
