= Siv Nordrum =

Norwegian journalist (1958–2021)

- Born: 7 October 1958; Drøbak, Norway
- Died: 24 April 2021 (aged 62)
- Occupation(s): Journalist, communications director, State Secretary
- Spouse: Christian Syse

Siv Nordrum (7 October 1958 – 24 April 2021) was a Norwegian journalist, communications director and politician.

Born in Drøbak, Nordrum worked as journalist from 1977, and was assigned with NRK radio and television in the 1980s and 1990s. At NRK she started working for the radio's main news programme Dagsnytt in 1984, and was a foreign correspondent for NRK in Asia 1989-1993.

From 2001 to 2005 she served as State Secretary at the Office of the Prime Minister, working with Kjell Magne Bondevik.

In 2006 she was appointed communications director at the University of Oslo, in 2012 she assumed a similar position for Statistics Norway, and from 2015 she was head of communications at the Storting.

Nordrum was married to Christian Syse, Norwegian ambassador to Sweden in Stockholm 2017-2021.

She died in April 2021 after a brief illness.
