= Jon Blaalid =

Norwegian civil servant

Jon Blaalid (born 1 May 1947) is a Norwegian civil servant.

He was born in Oslo, and holds the cand.oecon. degree in economics. He worked for Statistics Norway from 1974 to 1979 and the Ministry of Trade from 1979 to 1987. From 1988 to 1990 he was deputy under-secretary of state in the Ministry of Foreign Affairs, and from 1990 to 1997 he was deputy under-secretary of state in the Ministry of Local Government. From 1997 to 2004 he was the executive director of Statskonsult, except for the period 2000 to 2001 when he was the acting director of Aetat. He succeeded Ted Hanisch who was fired with immediate effect.

Civic offices
Preceded by Tore Lorentzen (acting)	Director of Statskonsult; 1997–2004	Succeeded by Gunnar Bakkeland
Preceded by Ted Hanisch	Director of Aetat; 2000–2001 (acting)	Succeeded by Lars Wilhelmsen
