= Brit Fougner =

Norwegian politician (born 1946)

Brit Fougner (born 21 February 1946) is a Norwegian organizational leader and politician for the Socialist Left Party.

From 1990 to 1994 she was the managing director of the Council for Equality (a predecessor of the Centre for Equality, which in turn was a predecessor of the Norwegian Equality and Anti-Discrimination Ombud). She was hired in Norsk Form in 1995, first as information director but then as chief executive from 2003 to 2008.

She served as a deputy representative to the Parliament of Norway from Oslo during the term 1989–1993. She was also the chairperson of Oslo Concert Hall from 1992 to 2004.

She was married to Einar Førde.
