= Ted Hanisch =

Norwegian sociologist, civil servant and politician

Theodor "Ted" Hanisch (born 20 April 1947) is a Norwegian sociologist, civil servant and politician for the Labour Party.

He was born in Tønsberg. He graduated with the mag.art. degree (PhD equivalent) in sociology, and was a director at the Norwegian Institute for Social Research from 1978. In 1986, when the second cabinet Brundtland assumed office, he resigned to become a State Secretary in the Office of the Prime Minister. He lost this job in 1989, when the second cabinet Brundtland fell. Hanisch was then hired as director general of the newly established CICERO, Center for International Climate and Environmental Research in Oslo. In April 1993 he assumed a new position, as vice director of Aetat(Directororate of Labour). The director Bjartmar Gjerde was soon to retire and Hanish was promoted to director of Aetat in 1994, assuming the position in 1995. He left the position of director of Aetat in 2000.

Hanisch was the chairman of the board of Enova 2002–2008.

Civic offices
Preceded by Bjartmar Gjerde	Director of Aetat; 1995–2000	Succeeded by Jon Blaalid (acting)
