= Arvid Johanson =

Norwegian politician (1929–2013)

Minister of Petroleum and Energy
- In office 3 October 1980 – 14 October 1981
- Prime Minister: Odvar Nordli; Gro Harlem Brundtland
- Preceded by: Bjartmar Gjerde
- Succeeded by: Vidkunn Hveding

Member of the Norwegian Parliament
- In office 1 January 1958 – 30 September 1981
- Constituency: Østfold

Personal details
- Born: Arvid Helmer Johanson; 3 February 1929 Halden, Østfold, Norway
- Died: 6 November 2013 (aged 84) Halden, Østfold, Norway
- Party: Labour

Arvid Helmer Johanson (3 February 1929 – 6 November 2013) was a Norwegian newspaper editor and politician for the Labour Party. He served five full terms in the Parliament of Norway, was Norway's second Minister of Petroleum and Energy from 1980 to 1981, and outside politics he spent most of his career in the newspaper Halden Arbeiderblad.

== Early life and career ==
He was born in Halden as a son of Arvid Martin Johanson (1896–1981) and housewife Karla Niemi (1899–1932). He started his career as a journalist in Halden Arbeiderblad in 1947, and remained there for a year. In 1949 he worked in Sarpsborg Arbeiderblad. He returned to Halden Arbeiderblad, and remained there for the rest of his career. He underwent studies at the Norwegian Journalist Academy from 1942 to 1953 and at Fircroft College from 1954 to 1955. He was a board member of the county chapter of the Norwegian Press Association from 1954 to 1955.

== National politics ==
Johanson became involved in politics as leader of the local workers' youth organization in 1949. He was elected as a member of Halden municipal council from 1959 to 1963. He chaired the Labour Party branch in Halden from 1956 to 1958 and 1962 to 1963, and the county chapter in Østfold from 1962 to 1974. From 1969 to 1974 he was a member of the central committee of the Labour Party.

He served as a member of the Parliament of Norway from Østfold during the terms 1958–1961, 1965–1969, 1969–1973, 1973–1977 and 1977–1981, and as a deputy member during the terms 1954–1957 and 1961–1965. From 1964 to 1965 he served as a regular representative, following the death of Henry Jacobsen. Towards the end of his fifth full term in Parliament, Johanson was appointed as Minister of Petroleum and Energy. He was the second to hold this position, replacing Bjartmar Gjerde. Gjerde had asked Prime Minister Odvar Nordli that his resignation be allowed because of high pressure in the job, with incidents like the Alta controversy and the Alexander Kielland rig disaster. Johanson lost his position when the centre-right Willoch's First Cabinet took over 1981. While Johanson was a government minister, his seat in Parliament was taken by Jan Eilert Bjørnstad.

== Later career ==
After leaving national politics, Johanson returned to Halden Arbeiderblad. He was promoted to editor-in-chief in 1982, and served until 1993. He chaired the county chapter of the Association of Norwegian Editors from 1987 to 1990. He also wrote several books, particularly on local history.

Political offices
Preceded by Bjartmar Gjerde	Norwegian Minister of Petroleum and Energy; 1980–1981	Succeeded by Vidkunn Hveding
