= Harry Danielsen =

Norwegian educator and politician (1936–2011)

Harry Danielsen (14 September 1936 – 12 May 2011) was a Norwegian educator and politician for the Conservative Party, later independent.

He was born Rødøy Municipality as a son of a fisherman. After commerce school and military education he worked as a teacher in Steigen Municipality from 1958 to 1969, interrupted by the formal education as a teacher which he finished in 1968. He was a headmaster in Steigen from 1969 to 1971, speech trainer in Alstahaug from 1971 to 1972 before having various educational positions in Lurøy Municipality from 1972 to 1998.

His first public position was as a school board member in Steigen from 1960 to 1968. From 1960 to 1966 he also chaired the local Conservative Party branch. He was the deputy leader of Nordland Conservative Party from 1975 to 1977, and chaired the branch in Lurøy from 1978 to 1980. He was a member of the executive committee of the municipal council of Lurøy Municipality and Nordland county council from 1979 to 1983.

He was first elected to the Parliament of Norway representing Nordland in 1981. He was a member of the Standing Committee on Transport. He was then a deputy representative during the terms 1985–1989 and 1985–1989. From 1985 to 1986 he met regularly as a deputy of Petter Thomassen, the Minister of Industry of Willoch's Second Cabinet. Danielsen left the Conservative Party and became independent on 1 October 1987.
