= Jens-Halvard Bratz =

Norwegian politician (1920–2005)

Jens-Halvard Bratz (21 April 1920 – 19 January 2005) was a Norwegian business executive and government minister with the Conservative Party. He served as Norwegian Minister of Industry from 1981–1983.

Jens-Halvard Bratz was born at Østre Aker in Oslo, Norway. He was a student at Oslo Commerce School (Oslo Handelsgymnasium) (1940) with continued studies in England and the United States (1945-1946). Bratz was married in 1946 to Sissel Lie (1922-1983) and was a son-in-law of Trygve Lie, who served as the first Secretary-General of the United Nations.

In 1941, he was first employed at the ironworks firm Grorud Jernvarefabrikk in Groruddalen followed by various positions with the firm. He was for many years director of the Grorud Jernvarefabrikk (1941-1981). The ironworks had been founded by his father Ragnvald Bratz (1889-1968) in 1917.

He also served in the leadership of numerous organisations. He was vice-president and president (1971-73) of the Norwegian Industrial Federation and chairman of the Norwegian Industrial Bank (1984-88). He was a member of the Board of Directors of the Mechanical Workshop Association (Mekaniske Verksteders Landsforening) and served as chairman (1970-1981). He was among the people who initiated the Norwegian Glacier Museum (Norsk Bremuseum) in Sogndal Municipality during 1991.

Bratz also held various positions with the Conservative Party including chairman of the board of finance (1974-1981). He served as Minister of Industry in the cabinet of Kåre Willoch from its accession in October 1981 until his resignation on 16 September 1983.

== Awards ==
- Commander of the Order of Vasa - 1974
- Knight of 1st grade of Order of St. Olav - 1976

Political offices
| Preceded by Finn Kristensen | Norwegian Minister of Industry; 1981–1983 | Succeeded by Jan P. Syse |
