= Center for International Climate Research =

Interdisciplinary research centre for climate

CICERO Center for International Climate Research
- CICERO Senter for klimaforskning STI
- Abbreviation: CICERO
- Formation: 1990
- Type: Research institute
- Location: Oslo
- Leader: Christine Tørklep
- Website: cicero.oslo.no

The CICERO Center for International Climate Research (abbreviated CICERO; Norwegian: CICERO Senter for klimaforskning) is an interdisciplinary research centre for climate research and environmental science/environmental studies in Oslo. CICERO was established as an independent foundation by the Government of Norway in 1990. The current director is Cristine Tørklep.

== Directors ==
- Ted Hanisch (1990–1993)
- Helga Hernes (1993–1996)
- Knut H. Alfsen (1997–2002)
- Pål Prestrud (2002–2012)
- Cecilie Mauritzen (2012–2013)
- Kristin Halvorsen (2014–2026)
- Christine Tørklep (2026-)

== Arctic collaboration ==
CICERO is an active member of the University of the Arctic. UArctic is an international cooperative network based in the Circumpolar Arctic region, consisting of more than 200 universities, colleges, and other organizations with an interest in promoting education and research in the Arctic region.
