= Oslo Center =

Oslo Center for Peace and Human Rights
- Formation: January 9, 2006; 20 years ago
- Founders: Kjell Magne Bondevik; Einar Steensnæs
- Type: Non-governmental organization
- Headquarters: Nairobi, Kenya
- CEO: John Inge Løvdal
- Website: oslocenter.no

The Oslo Center for Peace and Human Rights, commonly known as the Oslo Center, is a nongovernmental organization founded in Oslo, Norway, on 9 January 2006 by former Norwegian prime minister Kjell Magne Bondevik and former cabinet minister Einar Steensnæs. The organization was established to promote peace, human rights, and interreligious dialogue; over time its work has increasingly focused on democracy assistance, including support for political institutions, civil society, and electoral processes in partner countries. Amid some years of financial difficulty, the Oslo Center closed most of its Norway office in 2022 and shifted its operational base to Nairobi, Kenya. The organization has also drawn scrutiny over its funding sources and over the conduct of Bondevik. As of January 2026, the Oslo Center is led by Chief Executive Officer John Inge Løvdal, with Finn Jarle Rode serving as Chair of the board. The center's current work centers on democracy assistance and governance support in East Africa, alongside continuing human rights and interreligious dialogue programs.

== History ==
=== Founding ===
==== Establishment ====
The Oslo Center was founded on 9 January 2006 by Kjell Magne Bondevik, shortly after he left office as prime minister, together with former Minister of Education and Research Einar Steensnæs. In announcing the center, Bondevik told the newspaper Aftenposten that it would focus on mediating negotiations between governments in conflict areas and would draw on the political networks of its staff, many of them former politicians and civil servants. The center was organized as a foundation with an initial staff of five to six people and a planned annual budget of eight to ten million kroner. Bondevik served as director on a part-time basis until taking up the role full-time in the autumn of 2006, with Einar Steensnæs serving as director in a 40 percent position and Bondevik's former political adviser Øistein Mjærum as chief of staff. From February 2006 to August 2007, concurrent with the center's founding, Bondevik served as United Nations Secretary-General Kofi Annan's Special Humanitarian Envoy for the Horn of Africa, succeeding former Finnish president Martti Ahtisaari in the role and addressing drought and food insecurity affecting an estimated 11 million people across Somalia, Kenya, Djibouti, and Ethiopia.

==== Initial funding and criticism ====
Bondevik's announcement of the center drew criticism from Norwegian political commentators and newspapers, who questioned whether a recently retired prime minister should accept large sums from the Norwegian government and business community that had benefited from his own policies while in office. His choice of Thorbjørn Jagland, then President of the Norwegian Parliament, as chairman of the center's board drew separate criticism, including questions about whether the center was truly independent of government given that its launch was announced from Jagland's parliamentary office. Bondevik rejected the criticism as unreasonable, telling Dagsavisen in April 2006 that there was full transparency about the center's finances and that contributions were given without conditions.

=== Early period (2006–2010) ===
In its first years, the Oslo Center concentrated on interreligious and intercultural dialogue and on raising awareness of human rights conditions in specific countries.

==== North Korea ====
The center produced two reports, in 2006 and 2008, documenting the human rights and humanitarian situation in North Korea, and in 2009 submitted a report to the UN Human Rights Council's Universal Periodic Review recommending that the UN Security Council adopt a non-punitive resolution aimed at opening the country to humanitarian relief and that the UN General Assembly strengthen its annual resolution on North Korea with reference to the "responsibility to protect" doctrine.

==== Burma: letter for Aung San Suu Kyi ====
In October 2009, the center released an open letter to Burmese military leader Than Shwe calling for the release of pro-democracy leader and Nobel laureate Aung San Suu Kyi, signed by more than 50 former heads of state and government, including former United States presidents George H. W. Bush, Jimmy Carter, and Bill Clinton, former British prime ministers John Major and Margaret Thatcher, and former Pakistani prime minister Benazir Bhutto.

==== Universal Code of Conduct on Holy Sites ====
The center also began developing what became the Universal Code of Conduct on Holy Sites, produced in cooperation with partner organizations, intended as a framework for protecting religious sites in conflict zones.

=== Shift toward democracy assistance (2010–2022) ===
From around 2010, the Oslo Center's work increasingly centered on democracy assistance — support for political parties, governance institutions, independent oversight bodies, and civic participation — while continuing human rights and interreligious work as a smaller component of its programming. The center ran country programs in, among others, Kenya, Somalia, Myanmar, South Sudan, and Ukraine.

==== 2016 name change ====
In connection with its tenth anniversary in 2016, the organization changed its name from Oslo Center for Peace and Human Rights to The Oslo Center, a change the center said also signaled a new strategic direction.

==== 2018 leadership transition ====
In June 2018, Bondevik stepped aside as director after twelve years leading the organization he had founded, continuing part-time as a working chairman of the board; Einar Steensnæs, who had served as the center's director, left his position that October. At the time, the center had nine employees and entered a partnership with Bjørknes University College, relocating its offices to the college's premises near Lovisenberg while remaining a separate foundation.

=== Public recognition and events (2019) ===
==== Paris Peace Forum recognition ====
At the 2019 Paris Peace Forum, the center's Youth Assemblies concept — initiated in Mombasa, Kenya, in 2009 — was selected by the forum's Scale-Up Committee as one of ten "most promising governance projects" from 716 applicants. At the same forum, Oslo Center project leader Edwin Mulimi Nayendo spoke on a panel titled "Age is But A Number: Including Youth in Decision-Making Processes," alongside representatives of the Qatar Foundation, the European Student Think Tank, and the African Union–European Union Youth Cooperation Hub.

==== First Democracy Conference ====
In November 2019, the center hosted its first Democracy Conference, a two-day event with Norway's youth political parties and Norad support, combining a workshop for youth party wings with an open conference on democratic institutions and the United Nations's 2030 Agenda.

==== Kanu recognition ====
In October 2019, Kanu national chairman Gideon Moi publicly credited the Oslo Center, alongside the Konrad Adenauer Stiftung and the Centre for Multiparty Democracy, for its support of the party.

=== Country programs (2007–2018) ===
==== Kenya ====
The center began working with Kenyan political parties in 2007 on coalition-building, continuing after Kenya's 2008 Government of National Unity. Following Kenya's 2010 constitution and 2011 Political Parties and Elections Acts, it worked with the Office of the Registrar of Political Parties, the electoral commissions, and the Political Parties Dispute Tribunal on implementing the new framework, including party dispute-resolution rules endorsed in 2014.

==== Kyrgyz Republic ====
From 2009, the center partnered with the Norwegian Helsinki Committee on a freedom-of-religion project in Central Asia, initially in Kazakhstan; its focus shifted to the Kyrgyz Republic in 2012, which the center attributed to more difficult conditions in Kazakhstan. Work there included workshops for officials and parliamentarians on human rights and governance, and development of school curricula on religious history. The Norwegian Helsinki Committee independently confirmed a June 2015 joint mission to Bishkek by itself, the Oslo Center, and the Council for Religious and Life Stance Communities, discussing freedom of religion or belief with Kyrgyz state bodies and the prevention of stereotypes and discrimination against religious minorities. In November 2016, the center co-organized a workshop in Bishkek on natural-resource governance with Mongolia's International Cooperation Fund, Global Affairs Canada's Canadian International Resources and Development Institute, and the University of Central Asia, drawing government and industry participants from Kyrgyzstan, Mongolia, Myanmar, and Timor-Leste; co-founder Einar Steensnæs, then a senior adviser to the center, delivered opening remarks on the state's role in natural-resource management.

==== Somalia ====
The center opened a Mogadishu field office in January 2014, building on work since 2010 supporting Somalia's 2012 provisional constitution and multi-party system. From 2013 it worked with the Somali parliament, and in 2014 was appointed sole adviser to its Ad Hoc Committee on political parties, helping draft a political party law finalized in Kampala in April 2015. In November 2015, Bondevik led a delegation to Mogadishu, meeting Somali President Hassan Sheikh Mohamud and the parliament's speaker and deputy speaker to discuss bilateral cooperation and the center's role in supporting multi-party political institutions.

==== South Sudan ====
The center's Youth Dialogue Program in South Sudan, established in 2012 with the South Sudan Youth Participation Agency (SSYPA), aimed to give young people a unified voice across ethnic and religious divides following the country's 2011 independence. By 2015 it had established forums in five of South Sudan's ten states — Jonglei, Eastern Equatoria, Western Equatoria, Northern Bahr el Ghazal, and Central Equatoria — plus national-level forums.

==== Ukraine ====
According to founder Kjell Magne Bondevik, the center's Ukraine work from around 2014–2015 involved advising Ukrainian MPs on democratic governance and hosting Ukrainian delegations in Oslo.

==== Nepal ====
Following Nepal's 2015 constitution, the center partnered with the Nepal Law Society to help identify legislation needed for implementation, and worked with the National Democratic Institute on internal party democracy. In April 2026, the center invited a Nepali youth representative to its Words Matter! conference and an associated Youth Inclusion Workshop at Utøya, according to an independently published first-person account of the visit.

==== Sri Lanka ====
In 2018, with the Norwegian Christian Democratic Party and Norad support, the center began a pilot project with the Parliament of Sri Lanka on consensus and coalition-building, including a Sri Lankan study visit to Oslo. It concluded in 2019 with a follow-up mission to Colombo led by Bondevik and Einar Steensnæs. In September 2020, Norway's ambassador to Sri Lanka referenced the program in a meeting with the Speaker of Sri Lanka's parliament, independently confirming that a group of Sri Lankan MPs had visited the Norwegian Parliament and met representatives of Norwegian political parties as part of the initiative.

=== Financial difficulties (2011–2019) ===
The center's founders had said in 2006 that operations would be funded primarily by private sponsors rather than public money. An internal review of the center's accounts found that, after its initial five years of agreed private sponsorship ended, the Oslo Center was running at a deficit by 2011; it subsequently applied for and received Norwegian state project funding through the Ministry of Foreign Affairs and the Norwegian Agency for Development Cooperation (Norad), after an application for core funding was turned down. A Norwegian parliamentary answer given in December 2021 put total state funding allocated to the Oslo Center at approximately NOK 51 million between 2009 and 2015 (with an implementation period through 2017), amounting to roughly one in four kroner the center received.

=== Relocation to Kenya (2022–present) ===
==== Move to Nairobi ====
In 2022, amid years of operating deficits and declining equity, the Oslo Center closed most of its Oslo operations and transferred primary operational responsibility to its existing regional office in Nairobi, Kenya. Vårt Land reported that the relocation reflected three factors: a wish among the Nairobi-based staff to take on greater responsibility for the organization's work, Bondevik's desire to scale back his own role as he entered retirement, and the center's ongoing financial difficulties. As of the mid-2020s, its programming has concentrated substantially on East Africa, including institutional-strengthening work with Kenyan democratic institutions.

==== 2022–2023 programming ====
According to the center's 2022–2023 annual report, programming was organized around three pillars — inclusion, political representation, and democratic governance — from its 2022–2025 Strategy Paper. Kenya programs focused on youth and women's political participation and party accountability, including the Empowering Women in Politics (EWIP) program; in Somalia, the center supported multiparty-system strengthening in Puntland State. It also served as co-convenor of the Open Government Partnership's local chapter for the Nairobi City County Government, helping draft the county's 2021–2022 action plan and securing its reinstatement as an OGP local partner after a 2022 change in county leadership.

==== 2024 programming ====
According to the center's 2024 annual report, its Words Matter conference in Oslo drew more than 200 delegates and 20 speakers on hate speech and democracy, concluding with a white paper on countering online hate speech. The Africa Youth Forum, held at the UN Office in Nairobi in August 2024 with the Muslim World League, convened more than 380 young African leaders; speakers included Wiper Party leader Kalonzo Musyoka and Oslo Center representatives Finn Jarle Rode and Phoebe Mungai.

In Tanzania, the center consulted with several European embassies and local civil society organizations on governance and accountability. Through the EU-funded WYDE Civic Engagement–Accountability Hubs initiative, with the Kofi Annan Foundation and the Westminster Foundation for Democracy, it trained young Tanzanians on electoral participation and women's leadership.

In Kenya, the center ran several EU- and Nordic-funded programs on electoral reform, disability inclusion, and youth and women's political participation — including PIER-K, SIDPAK, WYDE, and a Youth Political Accountability project — reaching thousands of participants through party dispute-resolution training, youth assemblies, and accountability initiatives; CDPOK independently confirmed its disability-advocacy training role under PIER-K. One of these programs, in a February 2025 report, found that only 13.6 percent of youth felt represented in political party leadership, a finding later cited in Kenyan media coverage of youth political mobilization ahead of the 2027 election.

The center also supported Multi-Stakeholder Forum sessions with the Nairobi City County Government in 2024 as part of the county's Open Government Partnership process.

==== 2025–2026 programming ====
The center's Words Matter! conference continued in July 2025 and April 2026.

In March 2025, the center participated in an electoral-preparedness forum organized by the Election Observation Group (Kenya), alongside Mzalendo, the Independent Electoral and Boundaries Commission, and the Political Parties Dispute Tribunal, which launched two reports on Kenya's post-2022 electoral reforms, Pay to Play? and Beyond the Ballot.

That same month, Nairobi County launched its OGP Action Plan for 2024–2027, focused on public participation, open contracting, open data, and government resilience; the center's Kenya country director, Phoebe Mungai, welcomed the county's continued participation in the initiative following earlier disruption caused by the COVID-19 pandemic.

In June 2025, the center launched a hybrid solar power initiative providing electricity to a skills training center and neighboring places of worship in Nairobi's Mukuru informal settlement, in partnership with the Muslim World League and PowerAll Kenya.

The center continued regular engagement with Kenyan political and security institutions through late 2025, including a police–ORPP consultative meeting ahead of November's by-elections and a training program for women and youth leaders within Kenya's governing United Democratic Alliance party.

== Annual seminars and conferences ==
Since 2007, the Oslo Center has organized annual public seminars and conferences on democracy, peace, and human rights, typically with keynote speeches by former heads of state, Nobel laureates, and other international figures. In 2024, the format expanded into an annual conference series, Words Matter!, addressing polarization, disinformation, and hate speech.

Recorded keynote speakers and conference themes include:

- 2007 – Annual Seminar – Hans Blix and Vigdís Finnbogadóttir.
- 2008 – Annual Seminar – Jan Egeland.
- 2009 – Annual Seminar – Kofi Annan.
- 2010 – Annual Seminar – Shirin Ebadi.
- 2011 – Annual Seminar – F. W. de Klerk and Thabo Mbeki.
- 2012 – Annual Seminar – Wim Kok and Paavo Lipponen.
- 2013 – Annual Seminar – Swanee Hunt.
- 2014 – Annual Seminar – Vaira Vīķe-Freiberga.
- 2015 – Annual Seminar – Lech Wałęsa.
- 2016 – Tenth-Anniversary Seminar – Kofi Annan.
- 2017 – "Priorities in Norwegian Foreign Policy" – Erna Solberg and Jonas Gahr Støre.
- 2018 – "The State of Democracy" – Tarja Halonen and Jens Frølich Holte.
- 2019 – "The Drivers of Democratic Change" – Dag Inge Ulstein and Martha Karua.
- 2020 – No Annual Seminar identified.
- 2021 – Annual Webinar: "The Legacy of Democracies and Violation of Democratic Standards" – Gordon Brown.
- 2022–2023 – No dedicated Annual Seminar documented.
- 2024 – Words Matter!: "Tackling the Impact of Hate Speech" – Mohammad bin Abdulkarim Al-Issa.
- 2025 – Words Matter! 2025 – Nick Clegg.
- 2026 – Words Matter! 2026 – Jacinda Ardern.

== Mission and focus areas ==
The Oslo Center describes its mission as promoting stable democracies that respect equality, human dignity, and human rights, with thematic areas including democracy assistance, conflict resolution, interreligious dialogue, human rights advocacy, and women's and children's rights.

For 2026–2028, the center has outlined a strategy of narrower thematic focus, expanded geographic reach, and greater organizational resilience through digitized operations and diversified funding. It states its work is guided by accountability, independence, local ownership, and inclusion. Planned programming includes East Africa (Kenya, Somalia, Tanzania, Uganda), Asia (Afghanistan), Eastern Europe (Ukraine), Southern Africa (South Africa), and West Africa (Senegal), with strengthening the organization and its financial sustainability named as the top priority.

== Structure and governance ==
The Oslo Center is organized as an independent, non-partisan, not-for-profit foundation. Kjell Magne Bondevik served as the center's founding president; Einar Steensnæs served in an executive leadership role in its early years. The center's initial board of directors, announced at its January 2006 launch, was chaired by Thorbjørn Jagland and included Finnish president Tarja Halonen, former state secretary Vidar Helgesen, Rogaland County Governor Tora Aasland, and businessman Stig Olav Jacobsen.

As of 2018, the center's board was chaired by Bondevik, with Tarja Halonen chairing its separate Board of Trustees, an advisory body of around 34 members. Finn Jarle Rode joined the center as Executive Director beginning in 2019, before later becoming chairman of the board.

In October 2025, the Oslo Center announced the appointment of John Inge Løvdal, previously Program Director at the National Democratic Institute and at the Oslo Center itself, as Chief Executive Officer, effective 1 January 2026. As of that appointment, the board was chaired by Finn Jarle Rode, who also serves as CEO of the World Heart Federation. As of the mid-2020s, the board's other members include Anita Lekven, founder of the clothing company Infinity Norge; Olav Kjørven, senior director of strategy at the EAT Foundation and a former Norwegian government and United Nations official; Orpha Kemunto Ongiti, director of the Institute of Research at Africa Nazarene University and chair of the board's Kenya branch; Purity Karabai Mbabu, an advocate of the High Court of Kenya; Sturla Bang, a director at the printing company Nordisk Trykk; and Peter Lokol Lomulen, a management consultant at Silicon Africa Management Services.

== Funding ==
=== Early corporate and state funding ===
Early private corporate donors — including Aker, Statoil (later Equinor), Hydro, DNB, Orkla, and Gjelsten Holding — provided significant support in the initial years after the center's 2006 founding, but had largely withdrawn by around 2011–2012. Dagens Næringsliv reported at the time that Aker, DNB NOR, Hydro, Statoil, Orkla, and Gjelsten Holding, which together had accounted for six of the center's NOK 13 million in annual revenue, confirmed they would not renew their support agreements, prompting Bondevik to apply to the Ministry of Foreign Affairs for NOK 4.5 million in core funding — nearly half that year's budget. Public funding from the Norwegian Ministry of Foreign Affairs and Norad was substantial for a period, amounting to tens of millions of kroner over the years, but was reduced and had largely ended by around 2018. The center's total equity fell from NOK 6.8 million in 2015 to NOK 1.0 million in 2023, reflecting years of operating deficits and the loss of most of its traditional Norwegian corporate and public donors.

=== Muslim World League funding ===
A review of financial records by Dagbladet and Vårt Land found that Muslim World League funding had been a significant source of income for the Oslo Center in 2019, 2020, and 2021.

Dagbladet reported that Bondevik personally received approximately 5 million NOK (roughly US$560,000) in total from the Muslim World League between 2019 and 2021, with the majority of the funds going to the Oslo Center, channeled via the Dialogue for Peace Foundation, a foundation led by Oslo Conservative Party politician Aamir J. Sheikh.

As one example of these transfers, Dagbladet documented that in January 2021 alone, 509,000 NOK was paid to Bondevik personally and 2.75 million NOK was paid directly to the Oslo Center. Bondevik told Dagbladet that he had not drawn a salary from the Oslo Center for several years despite continuing to work there, that he maintained a practice of redirecting a large share of his personal fees to the organization, and that he had previously forgiven a personal loan he had made to the center during an earlier period of financial difficulty.

In June 2025, in partnership with the Muslim World League and PowerAll Kenya, the center launched a hybrid solar power initiative providing electricity to a skills training center and neighboring places of worship, including a mosque and a church, run by the Mukuru Slum Development Programme in Nairobi.

=== Kazakhstan op-ed payment ===
In 2022, the newspaper Vårt Land reported that Bondevik had received a fee from the communications agency Geelmuyden Kiese for a webinar and a newspaper article on the occasion of Kazakhstan's 30th anniversary of independence, published in 2021; the disclosure drew criticism, including an Aftenposten editorial that described the arrangement as unseemly, given Kazakhstan's crackdown on protesters during the 2022 Kazakh protests. Bondevik responded that the editorial had been misleading in some respects: he said he had not participated in any "celebration" of the anniversary as described, had not requested payment, and condemned the Kazakh government's recent abuses as strongly as Aftenposten had; he also stated that the Oslo Center itself had no involvement in the matter.

== See also ==
- Peace Research Institute Oslo
