= Minister of Energy (Norway) =

Norwegian cabinet position

Minister of Energy of Norway
- Energiministeren

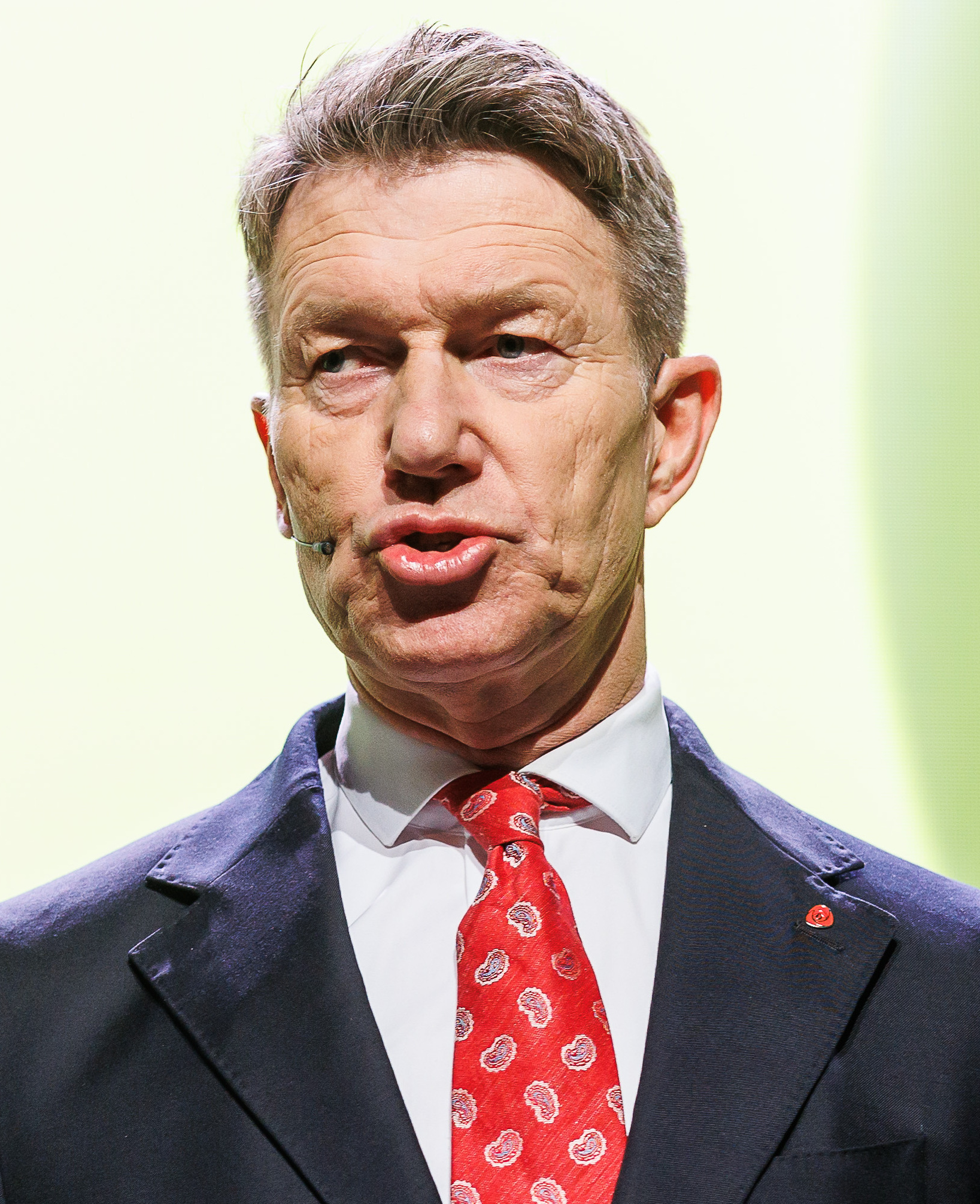
- Incumbent; Terje Aasland since 7 March 2022
- Ministry of Petroleum and Energy
- Member of: Council of State
- Seat: Oslo
- Nominator: Prime Minister
- Appointer: Monarch with approval of Parliament
- Term length: No fixed length
- Constituting instrument: Constitution of Norway
- Precursor: Minister of Trade and Industry
- Formation: 11 January 1978
- First holder: Bjartmar Gjerde
- Deputy: State secretaries at the Ministry of Petroleum and Energy
- Website: Official website

The Minister of Energy (Norwegian: Energiministeren) is a councilor of state and chief of the Norway's Ministry of Petroleum and Energy. The current minister is Terje Aasland. The ministry is responsible for the government's energy policy, including management of Norway's energy resources, including the valuable deposits of petroleum and hydroelectricity. Major subordinate agencies and companies include the Water Resources and Energy Directorate, the Petroleum Directorate, Petoro, Gassnova, Gassco, Enova, Statnett and a partial ownership of Statoil. The position was created on 11 January 1978 as a response to the increased importance of oil on the Norwegian continental shelf. The position was merged with the Minister of Trade and Industry between 1992 and 1996. It was renamed Minister of Energy starting from 1 January 2024.

The position has been held by seventeen people from five parties. No person has held the position for at least three years, resulting in one of the most volatile positions in the cabinet. Kåre Kristiansen holds the longest tenure, as one of six to have held the position for more than two years. The position has been a favorite of the Centre Party, who has claimed it in all coalition governments they have participated in except Willoch II. The position has overall been held longer by the Centre Party than the Labour Party.

== Key ==
The following lists the minister, their party, date of assuming and leaving office, their tenure in years and days, and the cabinet they served in.

Centre Party
Christian Democratic Party
Conservative Party
Labour Party
Progress Party

== Ministers ==
Photo	Name	Party	Took office	Left office	Tenure	Cabinet	Ref
	Bjartmar Gjerde	Labour	11 January 1978	3 October 1980	2 years, 266 days	Nordli	
–	Arvid Johanson	Labour	3 October 1980	14 October 1981	1 year, 11 days	Nordli; Brundtland I	
–	Vidkunn Hveding	Conservative	14 October 1981	8 June 1983	1 year, 248 days	Willoch I	
	Kåre Kristiansen	Christian Democratic	8 June 1983	9 May 1986	2 years, 336 days	Willoch II	
–	Arne Øien	Labour	9 May 1986	16 October 1989	3 years, 161 days	Brundtland II	
	Eivind Reiten	Centre	16 October 1989	3 November 1990	1 year, 19 days	Syse	
–	Finn Kristensen	Labour	3 November 1990	31 December 1992	2 years, 58 days	Brundtland III	
	Grete Faremo	Labour	25 October 1996	18 December 1996	54 days	Jagland	
–	Ranveig Frøiland	Labour	18 December 1996	17 October 1997	303 days	Jagland	
	Marit Arnstad	Centre	17 October 1997	17 March 2000	2 years, 152 days	Bondevik I	
	Olav Akselsen	Labour	17 March 2000	19 October 2001	1 year, 216 days	Stoltenberg I	
–	Einar Steensnæs	Christian Democratic	19 October 2001	18 June 2004	2 years, 243 days	Bondevik II	
	Thorhild Widvey	Conservative	18 June 2004	17 October 2005	1 year, 121 days	Bondevik II	
	Odd Roger Enoksen	Centre	17 October 2005	21 September 2007	1 year, 339 days	Stoltenberg II	
	Åslaug Haga	Centre	21 September 2007	20 June 2008	273 days	Stoltenberg II	
	Terje Riis-Johansen	Centre	20 June 2008	4 March 2011	2 years, 258 days	Stoltenberg II	
	Ola Borten Moe	Centre	4 March 2011	16 October 2013	2 years, 227 days	Stoltenberg II	
	Tord Lien	Progress	16 October 2013	20 December 2016	3 years, 65 days	Solberg	
	Terje Søviknes	Progress	20 December 2016	31 August 2018	1 year, 254 days	Solberg	
	Kjell-Børge Freiberg	Progress	31 August 2018	18 December 2019	1 year, 109 days	Solberg	
	Sylvi Listhaug	Progress	18 December 2019	24 January 2020	37 days	Solberg	
	Tina Bru	Conservative	24 January 2020	14 October 2021	1 year, 263 days	Solberg	
	Marte Mjøs Persen	Labour	14 October 2021	7 March 2022	144 days	Støre	
	Terje Aasland	Labour	7 March 2022	present	4 years, 184 days	Støre	
