= Tore Austad =

Norwegian politician (1935–2025)

Minister of Education and Church Affairs
- In office 14 October 1981 – 8 June 1983
- Prime Minister: Kåre Willoch
- Preceded by: Einar Førde
- Succeeded by: Kjell Magne Bondevik

Member of the Norwegian Parliament
- In office 1 October 1977 – 30 September 1989
- Constituency: Vest-Agder

Personal details
- Born: 8 April 1935 Skedsmo, Akershus, Norway
- Died: 21 January 2025 (aged 89) Norway
- Party: Conservative

Tore Austad (8 April 1935 – 21 January 2025) was a Norwegian politician for the Conservative Party. Born in Skedsmo, Akershus, he received a cand. philol. degree in 1962, and worked as a professor of Norwegian at the University of Chicago from 1964 to 1966. Returning to Norway he worked at various academic institutions, before being elected to the Storting from the county of Vest-Agder in 1977, where he sat for three periods, until 1989.

On 14 October 1981, he was appointed Minister of Education and Church Affairs in the new government of Kåre Willoch. On 8 June 1983, the Conservative Party joined in a coalition with the Christian Democratic Party and the Centre Party, in order to form a majority government. Austad had to resign, and his position was taken over by Kjell Magne Bondevik. He died on 21 January 2025, at the age of 89.

== Sources ==
- "Kåre Willoch's Government 1981 - 1986". Government.no. 12 December 2006.
- "Austad, Tore (1935-) Høyre" (in Norwegian). Stortinget. Archived from the original on 29 September 2007.

Political offices
Preceded by Einar Førde	Norwegian Minister of Church and Education Affairs; 1981–1983	Succeeded by Kjell Magne Bondevik
