= Kåre Kristiansen =

Norwegian politician

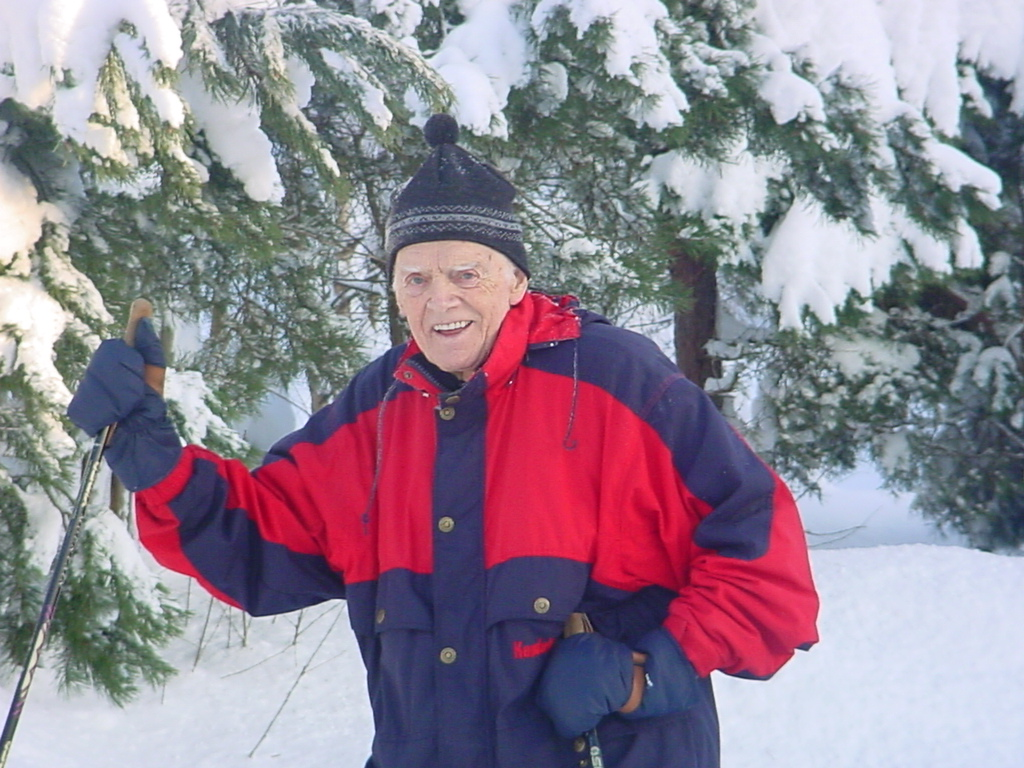
- Kristiansen in Nesodden in 2004

Minister of Petroleum and Energy
- In office 8 June 1983 – 9 May 1986
- Prime Minister: Kåre Willoch
- Preceded by: Vidkunn Hveding
- Succeeded by: Arne Øien

Leader of the Christian Democratic Party
- In office 1975–1977
- Preceded by: Lars Korvald
- Succeeded by: Lars Korvald
- In office 1979 – 16 April 1983
- Preceded by: Lars Korvald
- Succeeded by: Kjell Magne Bondevik

State Secretary for the Ministry of Social Affairs
- In office 15 October 1965 – 31 December 1968
- Prime Minister: Per Borten
- Minister: Egil Aarvik

Personal details
- Born: Kåre Gudbrand Kristiansen; 11 March 1920 Bergen, Norway
- Died: 3 December 2005 (aged 85) Nesodden, Norway
- Party: Christian Democratic

Kåre Gulbrand Kristiansen (11 March 1920 – 3 December 2005) was a Norwegian politician who was the leader of the Christian Democratic Party from 1975 to 1977 and again from 1979 to 1983 and Minister of Petroleum and Energy from 1983 to 1986. Noted as a right-wing conservative within his own party, he was known to take controversial positions at odds with the prevailing consensus.

== Biography ==
Kristiansen was born in Bergen, the son of a lay preacher. Both his parents were active in the Salvation Army. He started his professional life as a telegraph operator in the Norwegian railroad system, where he rose through the ranks. A devout Christian all his life, he became politically active in his home community of Nesodden in 1951.

Kristiansen was appointed State Secretary in the Ministry of Social Affairs in 1965 and served in this capacity until 1968. He was elected to Storting, first as a deputy member in 1969 and as a full member from 1973 to 1977 and 1981 to 1989. He was chairman of the parliamentary foreign affairs committee from 1981 to 1983 and Minister of Petroleum and Energy from 1983 to 1986.

He served as chairman for the Christian Democratic Party from 1975 to 1977 and 1979 to 1983. As a result of an internal dispute about how to cooperate with the Conservative Party, he resigned from the chair of his party and instead became parliamentary leader.

He stepped down from national politics in 1989 in protest against what he perceived as a change in course in the party's policy, but he remained politically active all his life, among other things by rejoining the municipal council of Nesodden, where he had started his political career.

Kristiansen stood his ground on a number of political issues, and his prominence within his party and in politics in general varied accordingly. He was particularly noted as one of the most ardent anti-abortion politicians in Norway. He was also a proponent of Norwegian membership in the European Union, advocated strong collaborative efforts with the Conservative Party and even the Progress Party. He was a strong supporter of Israel and founded and became the first leader of Friends of Israel in the Parliament of Norway in 1974.

In 1994, he resigned from the Norwegian Nobel Committee in protest over the award of the prize to Yasser Arafat, whom he labeled "world's most prominent terrorist". He opposed Israel's unilateral disengagement plan from the Gaza Strip in 2005, to the point of refusing an invitation to join in an event of Hjelp Jødene Hjem, a Norwegian Zionist organization that he was a board member of, because it also featured moderate Israeli politician and chief rabbi of Norway, Michael Melchior.

Party political offices
Preceded by Lars Korvald	Chairman of Christian People's Party; 1975–1977	Succeeded by Lars Korvald
Preceded by Lars Korvald	Chairman of Christian People's Party; 1979–1983	Succeeded by Kjell Magne Bondevik
Political offices
Preceded by Vidkunn Hveding	Norwegian Minister of Petroleum and Energy; 1983–1986	Succeeded by Arne Øien
