= Modulf Aukan =

Norwegian politician (born 1948)

Modulf Aukan (born 24 February 1948 in Tustna Municipality) is a Norwegian politician for the Christian Democratic Party.

He served as a representative to the Norwegian Parliament from Møre og Romsdal during the terms 1993–1997, 1997–2001, 2001–2005 and 2005–2009. From 1997 to 2000, and during the entire third term, he met as a regular representative meanwhile Kjell Magne Bondevik was prime minister in the first and second cabinet Bondevik.

Aukan was a member of the municipal council of Tustna Municipality from 1971 to 1995, serving the last two years as deputy mayor. He was a member of Møre og Romsdal county council from 1987 to 1997 and 1999 to 2007.
