= Kjell Magne Bondevik =

Prime Minister of Norway (1997–2000; 2001–2005)

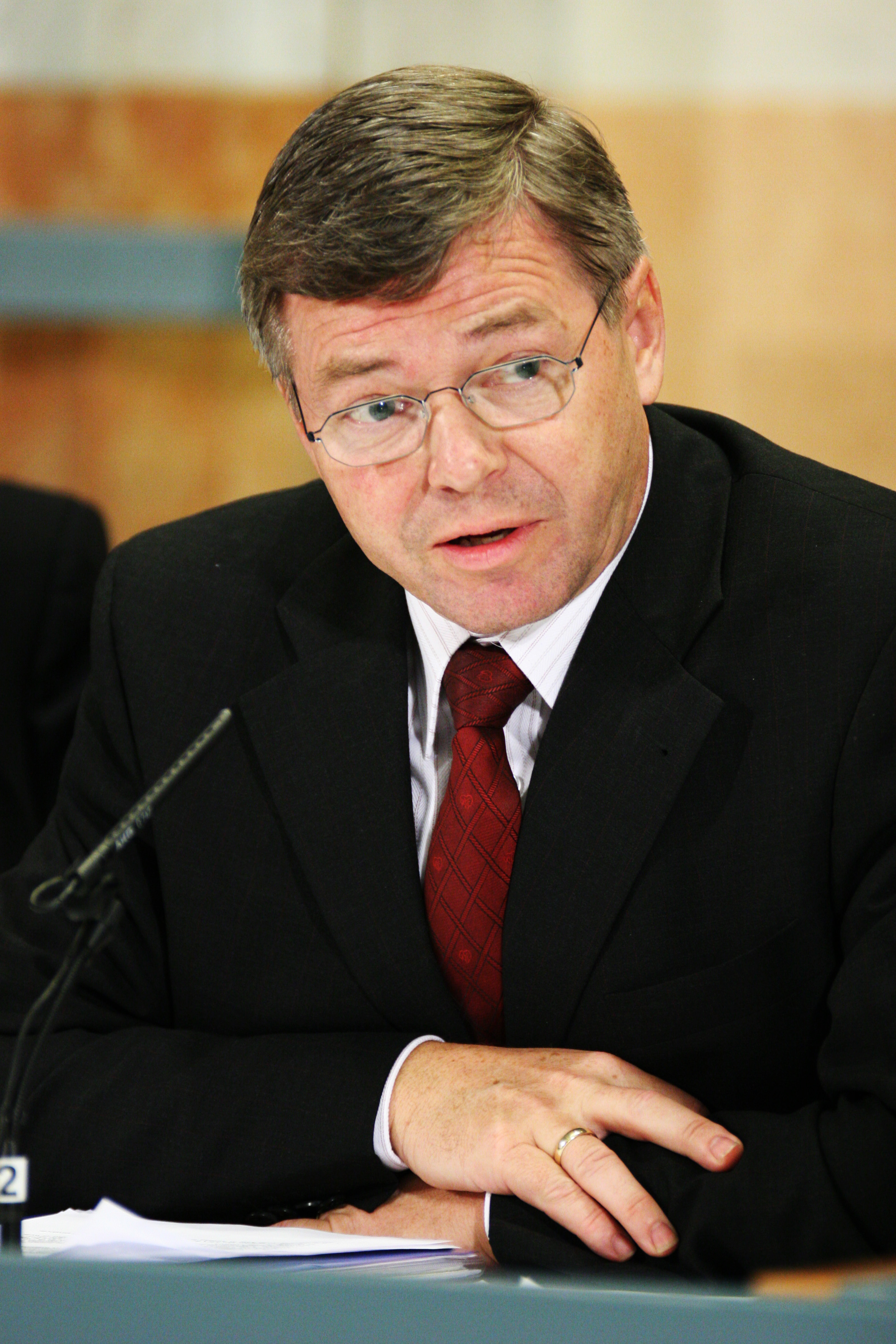
- Bondevik in 2004

Prime Minister of Norway
- In office 19 October 2001 – 17 October 2005
- Monarch: Harald V
- Preceded by: Jens Stoltenberg
- Succeeded by: Jens Stoltenberg
- In office 17 October 1997 – 17 March 2000
- Monarch: Harald V
- Deputy: Anne Enger; Odd Roger Enoksen
- Preceded by: Thorbjørn Jagland
- Succeeded by: Jens Stoltenberg

Deputy to the Prime Minister of Norway
- In office 4 October 1985 – 9 May 1986
- Prime Minister: Kåre Willoch
- Preceded by: Post established
- Succeeded by: Vacant (succeeded in 1997 by Anne Enger)

Minister of Foreign Affairs
- In office 16 October 1989 – 3 November 1990
- Prime Minister: Jan P. Syse
- Preceded by: Thorvald Stoltenberg
- Succeeded by: Thorvald Stoltenberg

Minister of Education and Church Affairs
- In office 8 June 1983 – 9 May 1986
- Prime Minister: Kåre Willoch
- Preceded by: Tore Austad
- Succeeded by: Kirsti Kolle Grøndahl

Leader of the Christian Democratic Party
- In office 16 April 1983 – 24 March 1995
- Preceded by: Kåre Kristiansen
- Succeeded by: Valgerd Svarstad Haugland

State Secretary at the Office of the Prime Minister
- In office 23 October 1972 – 6 August 1973
- Prime Minister: Lars Korvald

Member of the Norwegian Parliament
- In office 1 October 1973 – 30 September 2005
- Deputy: Kjell Furnes; Agnes Reiten; Aud Inger Aure; Modulf Aukan
- Constituency: Møre og Romsdal

Deputy Member of the Storting
- In office 1 October 1969 – 30 September 1973
- Constituency: Møre og Romsdal

Personal details
- Born: 3 September 1947 (age 79) Molde, Møre og Romsdal, Norway
- Party: Christian Democratic
- Spouse: Bjørg Bondevik
- Children: 3
- Education: MF Norwegian School of Theology

Kjell Magne Bondevik (Norwegian pronunciation: [ˈçɛlː ˈmɑ̀ŋnə ˈbʊ̀nːəviːk]; born 3 September 1947) is a Norwegian Lutheran minister and politician. As leader of the Christian Democratic Party, he served as the prime minister of Norway from 1997 to 2000, and from 2001 to 2005, making him, after Erna Solberg, Norway's second longest serving non-Labour Party prime minister since World War II. Currently, Bondevik is president of the Oslo Centre for Peace and Human Rights.

== Family and early life ==
Bondevik was born in Molde, the son of Johannes Bondevik, a principal at the Christian folk high school Rauma folkehøyskole who also was a local politician for the Christian Democratic Party, and Margit, née Hæreid. He became a theological candidate from MF Norwegian School of Theology in 1975. As Bondevik was active in Norwegian politics at a young age, he did not serve in the military. In 1979, he was ordained as pastor in the (Lutheran) Church of Norway.

He is married to Bjørg Bondevik (née Rasmussen) and has three children: Bjørn (born 1972), Hildegunn (born 1973), and John Harald (born 1976). Kjell Magne Bondevik is the nephew of politician Kjell Bondevik, the cousin of former bishop Odd Bondevik and brother in law of author and priest Eyvind Skeie.

== Political career ==
In 2008, Bondevik said that he regards himself as a "68'er", and that he was "influenced by the radical wind of the time". While he remained in the movement of Young Christian Democrats (Norway, KrFU), he claims to have "radicalized the organization to great despair in the party". He has also said that he would likely rather have "oriented" himself towards the Socialist People's Party, had his radicalization of the Christian Democratic Party not gone through. While not identifying as a socialist, Bondevik and fellow young Christian Democrats took issue with his party's explicitly anti-socialist line, preferring to identify with a third way between socialism and capitalism.

Representing the Christian Democratic Party, Bondevik was a member of the Storting (Parliament) from 1973 to 2005. He was his party's parliamentary leader in the periods of 1981–1983, 1986–1989, 1993–1997, 1997, and 2000–2001, and party leader from 1983 to 1995. In this position, he was succeeded by Valgerd Svarstad Haugland. He was also Minister of Foreign Affairs in Jan P. Syse's government of 1989–1990, Minister of Church and Education in Kåre Willoch's government 1983–1986, also Prime Minister Willoch's deputy 1985–1986, and state secretary at the Office of the Prime Minister during Lars Korvald's government 1972–1973.

Bondevik supported Norway's accession to the European Economic Area in 1990, but opposed full accession to the European Union in 1994.

=== As Prime Minister ===
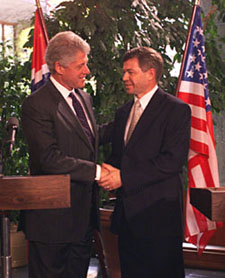
Bondevik with U.S. President Bill Clinton in Oslo, 1 November 1999

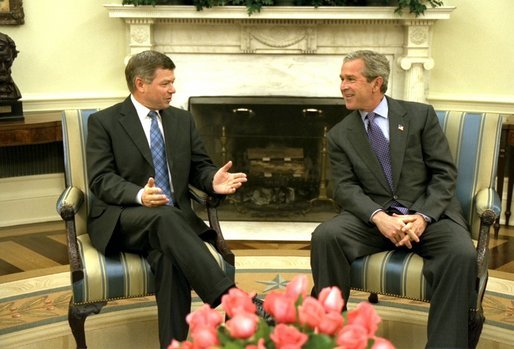
Bondevik with U.S. President George W. Bush in Washington, D.C., 16 May 2003

Bondevik's first term as prime minister lasted from 17 October 1997 to 3 March 2000, in a coalition cabinet consisting of the Christian Democratic Party, the Centre Party and the Liberal Party.

While serving his first term as prime minister, Bondevik attracted international attention in August 1998 when he announced that he was suffering from a depressive episode, becoming the highest ranking world leader to admit to suffering from a mental illness while in office. Upon this revelation, Anne Enger became acting prime minister for three weeks, from 30 August to 23 September, while he recovered from the depressive episode. Bondevik then returned to office. Bondevik received thousands of supportive letters, and said that the experience had been positive overall, both for himself and because it made mental illness more publicly acceptable.

Bondevik's first cabinet resigned after losing a confidence vote in March 2000 as a result of a dispute over the construction of gas-fired power stations and was replaced by a Labour Party government led by Jens Stoltenberg until their defeat in the 2001 parliamentary election. Bondevik then formed his second cabinet, consisting of the Christian Democratic Party, the Conservative Party and the Liberal Party, which took office on 19 October 2001.

During his second term, Bondevik's government presented reforms including the Knowledge Promotion education reform and a pension reform proposal. Statistics Norway described the Norwegian economy as entering a small boom. In the 2005 parliamentary election, the Red-Green Coalition won with 87 of 169 seats, while the governing parties and Progress Party together held 82 seats.

Bondevik announced his retirement from national-level politics at the end of his term as prime minister, and did not seek re-election for his seat in parliament.

== Post-premiership ==
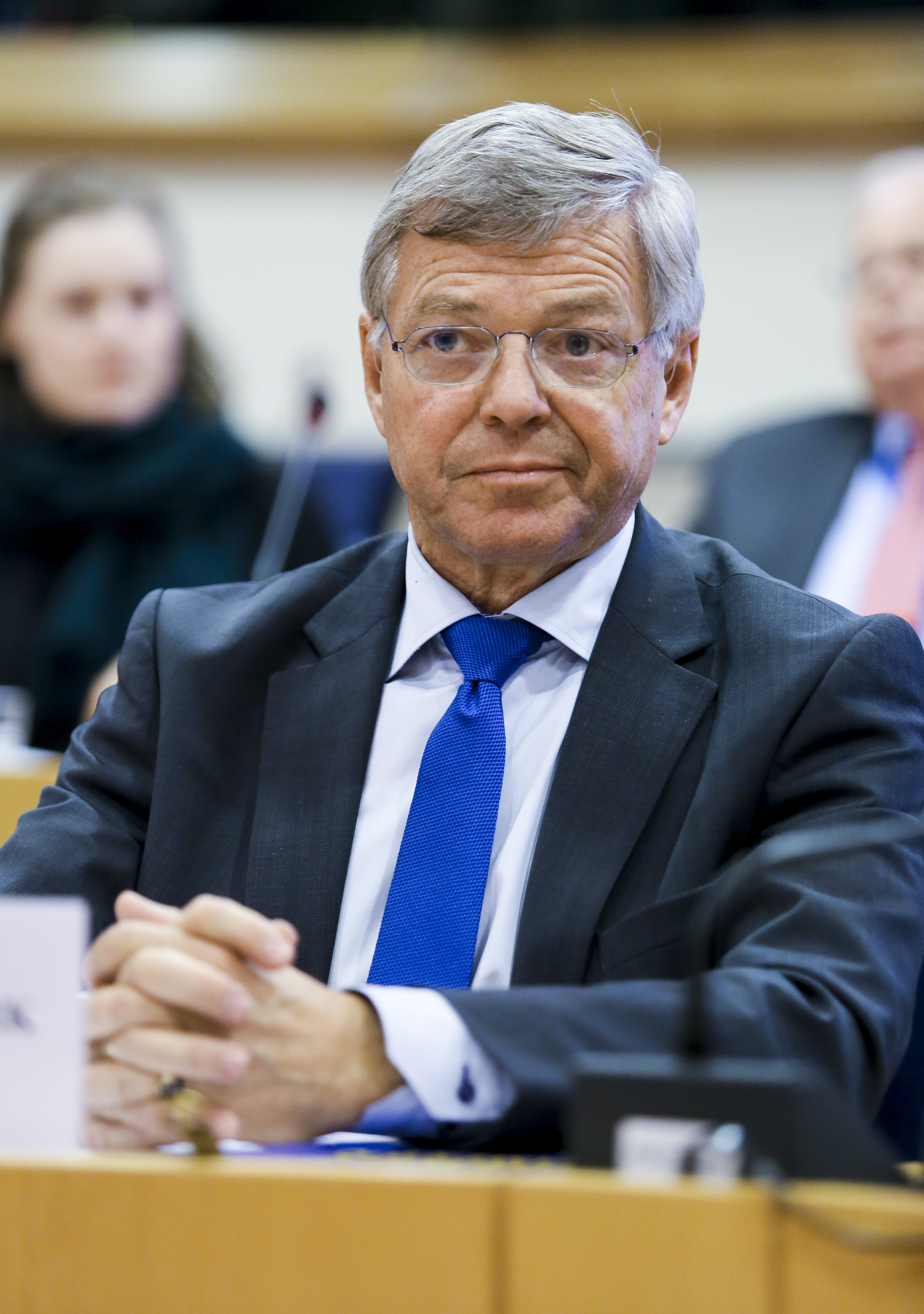
Bondevik in 2016

The Oslo Centre for Peace and Human Rights was founded by Bondevik in January 2006. The purpose of the centre is to work for world peace, human rights and inter-religious tolerance worldwide. The centre cooperates closely with the Carter Center in Atlanta, the Kim Dae Jung Library in Seoul and the Crisis Management Initiative in Helsinki.

On 31 October 2006, he published his memoir, called Et liv i spenning (A life of excitement and tension).

On 31 January 2017, he was the first high-ranking politician from another country detained and questioned in the United States as a result of President Donald Trump's executive orders banning immigration from seven predominantly Muslim nations, because of a diplomatic visit to Iran he had made in 2014.

In 2022, it was revealed that Bondevik had published a glowing appraisal of Kazakhstan in the Norwegian daily newspaper Vårt Land after receiving cash payments from the government of Kazakhstan.

Earlier, in 2021, the Norwegian newspaper Dagbladet had revealed that one of Bondevik's colleagues, the Conservative Party politician Aamir J. Sheikh, had requested a cash payment of 704,000 NOK from the government of Bahrain in an e-mail, with Bondevik as one of the carbon-copied (CC) recipients. "A month later, Bondevik and Sheikh handed out an 'honorary prize' to representatives of Bahrain's prime minister," the newspaper wrote.

== Awards and decorations ==
Bondevik was awarded the Grand Cross of St. Olav in 2004, the first sitting Norwegian Prime Minister to receive the Order of St. Olav in 80 years. The award happened due to a change in the Statutes of the Order with automatic awards to the prime minister and Ministers of the Government that stirred some debate and criticism. With the succeeding Stoltenberg Government, the practice was halted.

He is a full member of the Club de Madrid, a group of former leaders of democratic states that works to strengthen democratic governance and leadership.

Bondevik is an Honorary Member of The International Raoul Wallenberg Foundation.

In 2009, Bondevik was awarded an honorary degree from the University of San Francisco.

Party political offices
Preceded by Sverre Pettersen	Chairman of the Youth of the Christian People's Party; 1970–1973	Succeeded by Ivar Molde
Preceded by Kåre Kristiansen	Leader of the Christian Democratic Party; 1983–1995	Succeeded by Valgerd Svarstad Haugland
Political offices
Preceded by Tore Austad	Norwegian Minister of Church and Education Affairs; 1983–1986	Succeeded by Kirsti Kolle Grøndahl
Preceded by Thorvald Stoltenberg	Norwegian Minister of Foreign Affairs; 1989–1990	Succeeded by Thorvald Stoltenberg
Preceded by Thorbjørn Jagland	Prime Minister of Norway; 1997–2000	Succeeded by Jens Stoltenberg
Preceded by Jens Stoltenberg	Prime Minister of Norway; 2001–2005	Succeeded by Jens Stoltenberg
