= Anton Skulberg =

Norwegian politician (1921–2012)

Minister of Education and Church Affairs
- In office 18 October 1972 – 16 October 1973
- Prime Minister: Lars Korvald
- Preceded by: Bjartmar Gjerde
- Succeeded by: Bjartmar Gjerde

Member of the Norwegian Parliament
- In office 1 October 1969 – 30 September 1977
- Constituency: Østfold

Personal details
- Born: 29 December 1921 Christiania, Norway
- Died: 30 August 2012 (aged 90) Spydeberg, Østfold, Norway
- Party: Centre
- Spouse: Randi Berg
- Children: Per Kristian Skulberg
- Occupation: Scientist; Politician

Anton Skulberg (29 December 1921 – 30 August 2012) was a Norwegian scientist and politician for the Centre Party.

He was born in Kristiania as a son of Ragnvald Skulberg (1895–1972) and housewife Anna Marie Busch (1893–1946). Between 9 April 1940 and 27 May 1940 he participated as a soldier in the Norwegian Campaign. He enrolled as a student in 1942, graduated from the Norwegian School of Veterinary Science in 1949, and took further education at the universities of Oxford in 1955 and Cambridge in 1963. He took his doctorate (dr.med.vet.) in 1965, on the topic Studies on the formation of toxin by Clostridium botulinum. He was first employed at the Norwegian School of Veterinary Science in 1953, and was an associate professor from 1958 to 1960 and a research fellow from 1960 to 1961. From 1970 to 1991 he was a professor. During this time he was also director at the research institute Norsk Institut for næringsmiddelforskning from 1971 to 1988. He published 37 scientific papers.

Skulberg was a member of Spydeberg municipal council from 1963 to 1971, serving as mayor during the term 1963–1967. From 1963 to 1967 he was also a member of Østfold county council. He was elected to the Parliament of Norway from Østfold in 1969, and was re-elected on one occasion. He was the Minister of Church Affairs and Education in 1972–1973 during the cabinet Korvald. During his time in cabinet he was replaced in Parliament by Einar Brusevold and, briefly, Birgit Wiig.

Skulberg was a member of Norwegian National Council on Nutrition from 1971 to 1978, the Arts Council Norway from 1977 to 1980, the Norwegian Museum Authority from 1983 to 1991, NLVF from 1986 to 1990. He has also been involved in Rotary and the Church of Norway. He became a member of the Norwegian Academy of Science and Letters in 1984, received the Order of St. Olav in 1989 and became an honorary member of the Centre Party in 2001.

Political offices
Preceded by Bjartmar Gjerde	Norwegian Minister of Church Affairs and Education; 1972–1973	Succeeded by Bjartmar Gjerde
