= Terje Vareberg =

Norwegian economist and business executive

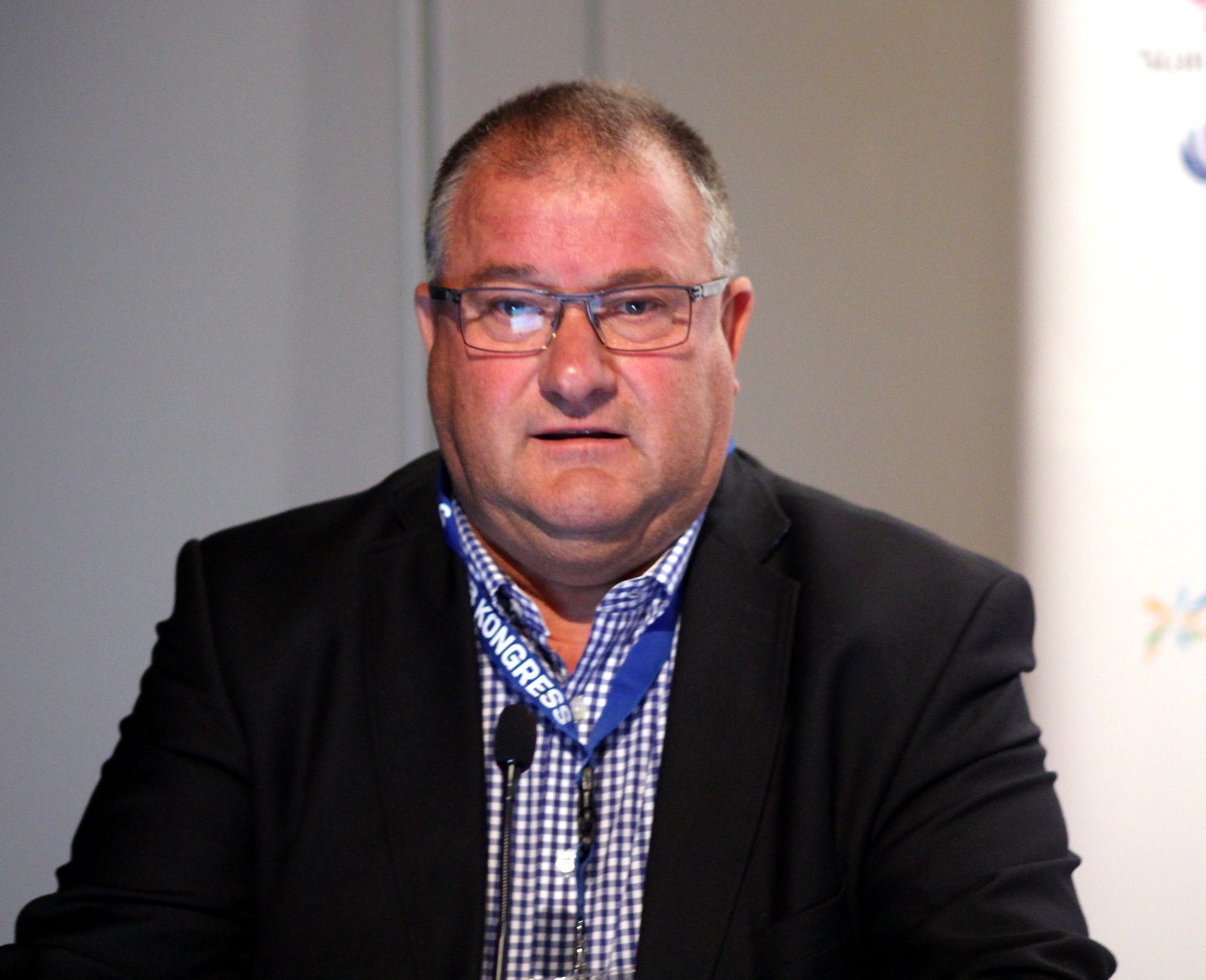
- Born: 15 October 1948 (age 77); Vestre Åmøy in Rennesøy Municipality, Norway
- Occupation: business executive

Terje Vareberg (born 15 October 1948) is a Norwegian economist and business executive.

He was born in Vestre Åmøy in Rennesøy Municipality, and graduated as economist from the Norwegian School of Economics in 1974.

He has worked for the Ministry of Trade and Industry, the Ministry of Petroleum and Energy, and for Statoil. From 1983 to 1989 he was director of Agro Fellesslakteri. He was chairman of the board of SpareBank 1 SR-Bank from 1994, and CEO from 2000. In 2005, he was elected chairman of the Norwegian Savings Banks Association. He has been chairman of the board of Norsk Hydro, the Western Norway Regional Health Authority, Statkraft. the International Research Institute of Stavanger (IRIS), and Stavanger Aftenblad. He has also been member of the board of Rogaland Teater.
