= Einar Førde =

Norwegian journalist and politician

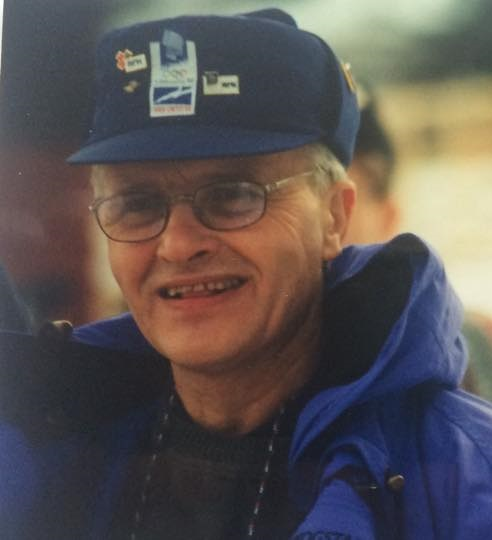
- Førde at the 1997 Nordic Ski Championship in Trondheim.

Parliamentary Leader for the Labour Party
- In office 10 May 1986 – 16 October 1989
- Leader: Gro Harlem Brundtland
- Preceded by: Gro Harlem Brundtland
- Succeeded by: Brit Jørgensen

Minister of Education and Church Affairs
- In office 8 October 1979 – 14 October 1981
- Prime Minister: Odvar Nordli; Gro Harlem Brundtland
- Preceded by: Kjølv Egeland
- Succeeded by: Tore Austad

Member of the Norwegian Parliament
- In office 1 October 1969 – 30 September 1989
- Constituency: Oslo (1969–1981, 1985–1989); Akershus (1981–1985)

Personal details
- Born: 20 January 1943 Høyanger, Sogn og Fjordane, Norway
- Died: 26 September 2004 (aged 61) Oslo, Norway
- Party: Labour
- Spouse(s): Synnøve Nymo (m. 1995; – 2004 his death); Brit Fougner (m. 1971; div. 1991)
- Children: 5

Einar Førde (20 January 1943 – 26 September 2004) was a Norwegian journalist and politician of the Labour Party. He served as Minister of Education and Church Affairs from 1979 to 1981, and director-general of the Norwegian Broadcasting Corporation (NRK) from 1989 to 2001. He was also vice-chairman of the Norwegian Labour Party 1981–1989.

In his youth, Førde was a middle-distance runner. Representing IK Tjalve, he ran the 800 metres in 1:52.6 minutes, at Bislett stadion in September 1964. He ran the 1500 metres in 3:50.3 minutes at Leangen stadion in August 1963.

Later, as director of the NRK, Førde became a prominent public figure, often known for fearlessly speaking his mind as a knowledgeable political analyst and public debater. After his death Kåre Willoch, former prime minister from the Conservative Party, called him a ground-breaker in society, combining great force of mind with warmth and humour. Førde was also known for appearing in TV-shows on NRK, lampooning his own character.

Førde died of cancer in 2004, at the age of 61.
