= Cecilie Mauritzen =

Norwegian oceanographer (born 1961)

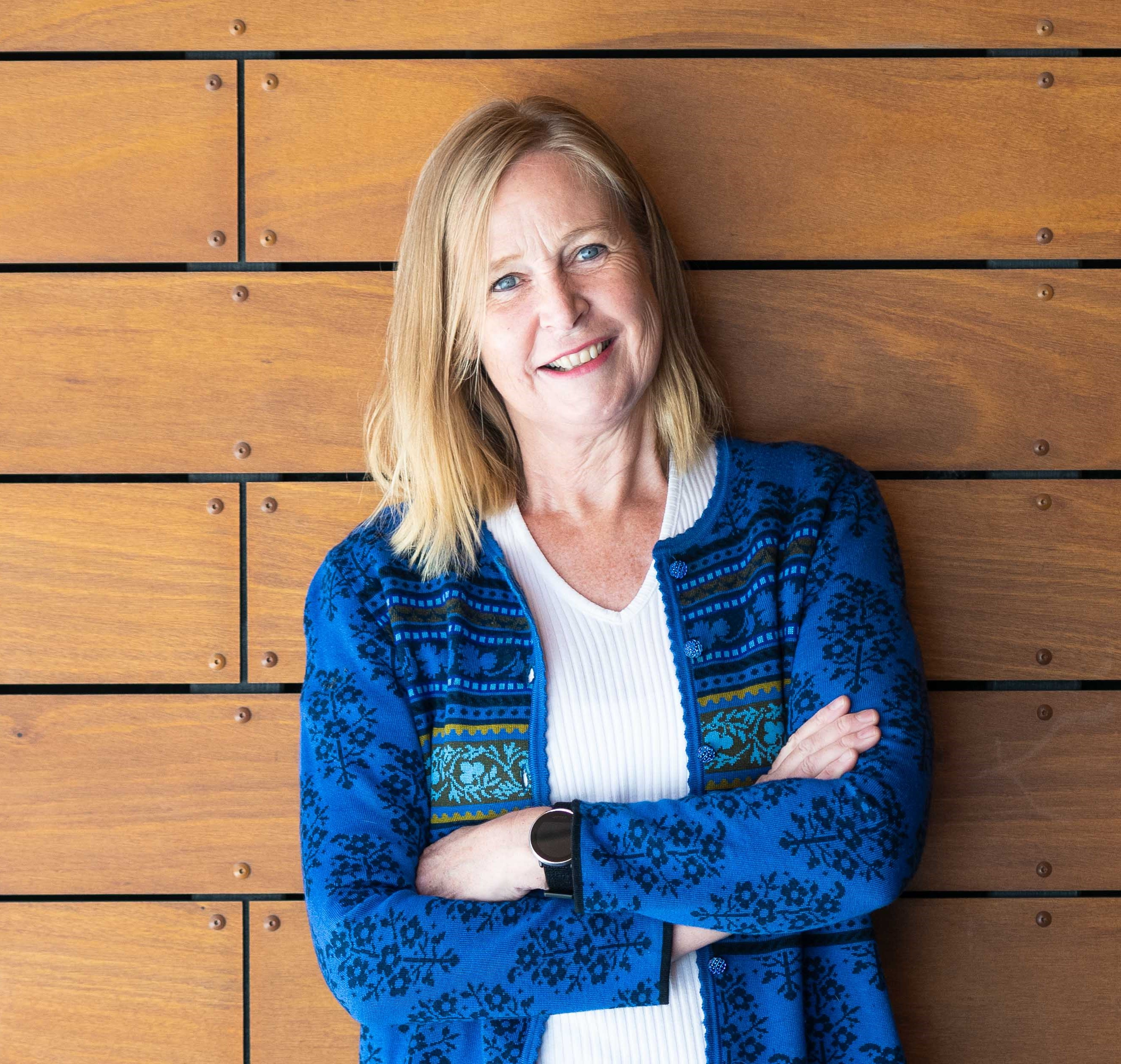
Mauritzen

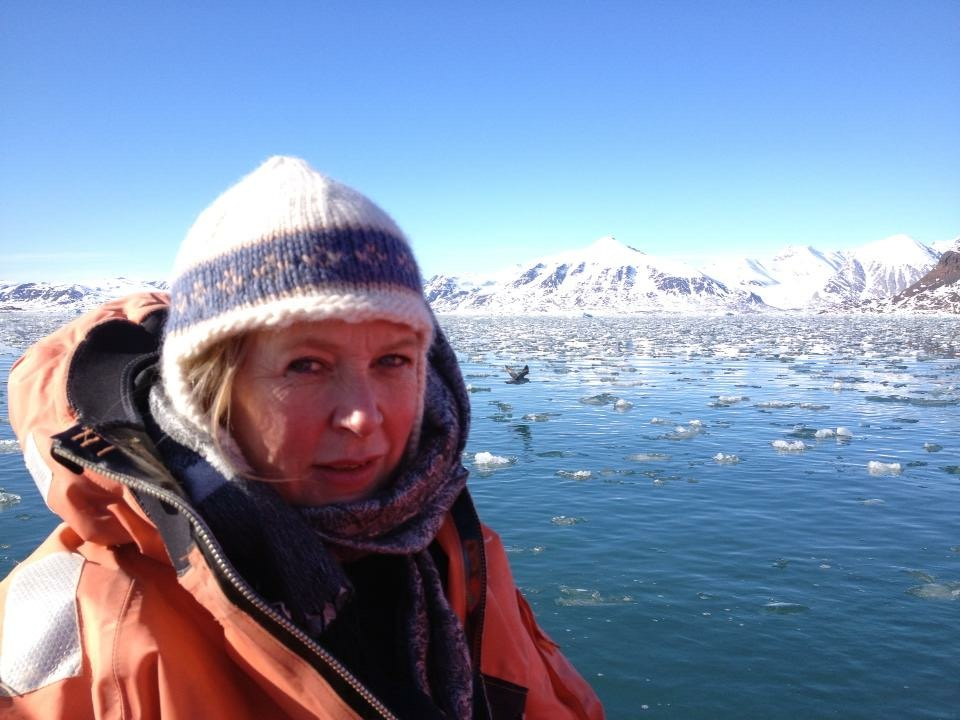

Cecilie Mauritzen (born 1961 in Oslo) is a Norwegian physical oceanographer who studies connections between ocean currents and climate change.

== Education and career ==
Mauritzen works as a researcher in the Norwegian Meteorological Institute. She graduated from the University of Bergen in 1987, and earned a PhD in 1994 from the Massachusetts Institute of Technology. After working for NASA at the Goddard Space Flight Center and for the Woods Hole Oceanographic Institution, she joined the Norwegian Meteorological Institute in 2002, and eventually became director of the climate division there. She was also the director of the Centre for International Climate and Environmental Research (CICERO) from 2012 to 2013. She returned to the Norwegian Meteorological Institute after working as vice president for Research at DNV GL, and as a head of climate research at the Norwegian Institute for Water Research (NIVA).

Her early contributions to oceanography are described in the textbook "Ocean Circulation in Three Dimensions" by Barry Klinger ("What Wrong Looks Like from the Inside"):

The Nordic Seas provide another example of conventional wisdom being replaced by a new idea. On global scales, warm water becomes colder and denser as it flows to polar regions, where the densest water sinks as part of the process of deep water formation. Therefore it was easy to accept a conceptual model of deep water formation in the Nordic Seas in which surface water enters from the Atlantic and cools as it flows into central regions of the basin, and part of the resulting water mass returns to the Atlantic in the dense overflows at the Greenland-Iceland-Scotland Ridge. Some of the densest surface water in the basin occurs in that area, which undergoes intense winter heat loss to the atmosphere and dramatic convection. Numerical models of convection show how an isolated region of cooling creates a subsurface tower of dense water which carries water downward when it slumps due to eddy generation. This model of Nordic Seas circulation was overturned by Norwegian oceanographer Cecilie Mauritzen in her PhD dissertation. She showed that the water took a longer route from the inflow to the outflow, with most of the cooling occurring in boundary currents around the periphery of the Nordic Seas and in the Arctic Ocean. Much of the large heat loss in the central basin was merely part of the seasonal cycle of temperature change of a thick layer of water, with relatively small volume transports exchanged with incoming or outgoing water. Later, numerical experiments such as showed that a fluid exchange between cooling basin and the rest of the ocean mostly occurred around the basin boundaries, with cold but relatively quiescent water in the middle "

In 2004, Mauritzen was included in the lead author team to write IPCC Fourth Assessment Report (2007), and since then she has focussed her work primarily on climate change. Nevertheless, in 2007–2009, during the International Polar Year, she led one of the Norwegian flagship projects: IAOOS Norway: Closing the loop.

She rejoined IPCC for the Fifth Assessment Report (2014), as a lead author for the ocean chapter.

Mauritzen's wide range of interests can best be described by the variety of her portfolio of research projects: only post 2020 she has led a project on machine learning on turbulence (Machine Ocean), a project on forecasting water quality (MARTINI) and an EU Horizon project on Integrated Assessment Modelling ( WorldTrans - Transparent Assessments for Real People).

Mauritzen lives in Oslo and has two grown sons.

== Recognition ==
Mauritzen is a member of the Norwegian Academy of Science and Letters and of the Norwegian Scientific Academy for Polar Research. In 2011 she received the "Fram Award for Polar Research", by the Committee for the Preservation of the Polar Ship Fram.
