= Vidkunn Hveding =

Norwegian politician (1921–2001)

Minister of Petroleum and Energy
- In office 14 October 1981 – 8 June 1983
- Prime Minister: Kåre Willoch
- Preceded by: Arvid Johanson
- Succeeded by: Kåre Kristiansen

Personal details
- Born: 27 March 1921 Orkdal, Sør-Trøndelag, Norway
- Died: 19 May 2001 (aged 80) Tysfjord, Nordland, Norway
- Party: Conservative
- Spouses: Grete Blydt Qvisler (m. 1986) Tone Barth (m. 1963; died 1980) Marie Palmstrøm (m. 1948; div. 1963)

Vidkunn Hveding (27 March 1921 – 19 May 2001) was a Norwegian politician for the Conservative Party, and the Minister of Petroleum and Energy from 1981–1983. Hveding was born in Orkdal Municipality in Sør-Trøndelag county, and was a civil engineer by profession. He was married to Marie Palmstrøm (1 September 1926 – 1 October 1986) from 1948 to 1963, and remarried in 1963 to Tone Barth (25 January 1924 - 10 October 1980), the sister of Professor of Social Anthropology Fredrik Barth (b. 1928). He died in Tysfjord Municipality in 2001.

Government offices
Preceded by Arvid Johanson	Norwegian Minister of Petroleum and Energy; 1981–1983	Succeeded by Kåre Kristiansen
