= Per Kristian Skulberg =

Norwegian physician and politician

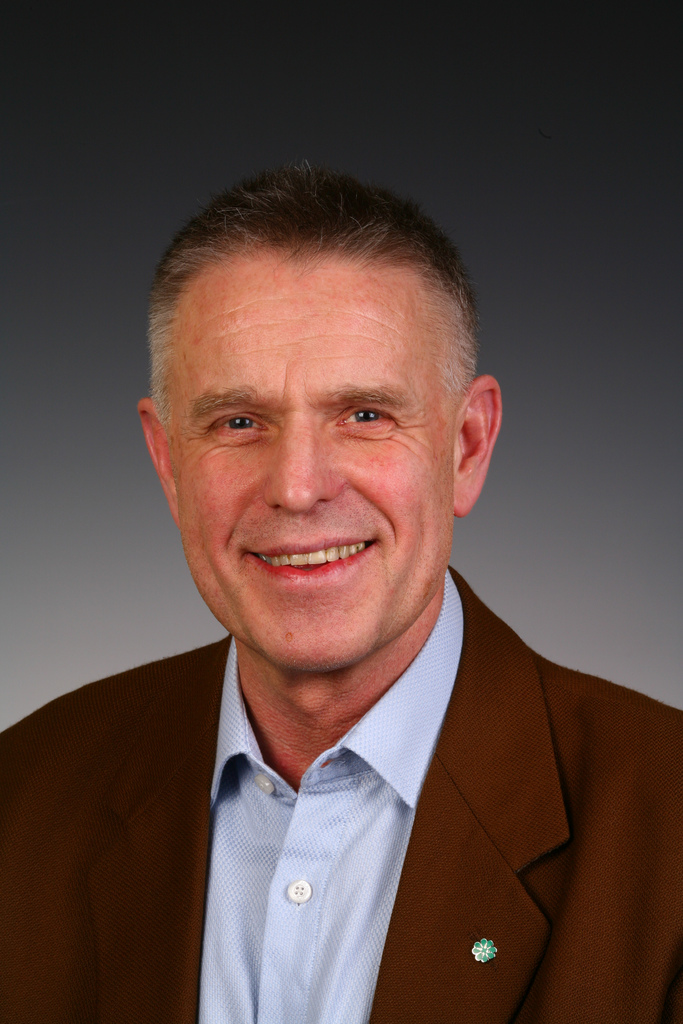
Per Kristian Skulberg

Per Kristian Skulberg (born 13 January 1951) is a Norwegian physician and politician. As former State Secretary in the Norwegian Ministry of Environment and in the Norwegian Ministry of Culture he has contributed within the field of heritage interpretation as basis for improved environmental management.

== Biography ==
On January 13, 1951 Per Kristian Skulberg was born on Skulberg Farm in Spydeberg, Norway to Anton Skulberg and Randi Berg. His childhood environment was influenced by his father, being a professor of veterinary medicine, Member of the Norwegian Parliament and full Minister of Cabinet. Within the field of natural science the limnologist Olav Magnus Skulberg and the environmental historian David Lowenthal have had a major impact on his career. At Makapuu Oceanic Center, Oahu, Hawaii 1970 Skulberg participated in studies within the field of oceanography and marine biology. He graduated from Medical School, University of Oslo in 1977.

== Career ==
Skulberg has been a general practitioner in Askim, Norway since 1979. He was Local councillor in the Municipality of Spydeberg 1979–1987. He served as private secretary to the Norwegian Minister of Environment 1984–1986. He was appointed State Secretary in the Norwegian Royal Ministry of Environment 1990 and State Secretary in the Norwegian Royal Ministry of Culture 1998–2000.

He was an executive board member of the National Council on Cultural Heritage 1986–1996, and he served as President of Heritage Interpretation International 1991–1995.

Skulberg was chairman of the executive board of The Norwegian Museum of Photography – Preus Museum 2001-2006 and of The National Constitution Centre of Norway Eidsvoll 1814, 2006 – 2010.

The Royal Norwegian Society for Development made him member of the board of representatives in 2006, and he has been the vice chairman of the executive board of Norsk Folkemuseum (National Folk Museum of Norway) 2010-2017 and of Norwegian Heritage 2011–2012. Since 1987 Skulberg has had the leadership of The municipal committee on local history publications and editor-in-chief for the publications "People and their homes – on ancient and present sites." The Settlement history of the Municipality of Spydeberg: Vol. 1 2003. Vol.2 2009 and Vol. 3 2015. A 4th volume is under production.

The contributions made by Spydeberg's famous chronicler Jacob Nicolai Wilse (1735-1801) has been of major interest to Skulberg. He therefore participated in the foundation of The Spydeberg Rectory Foundation (Stiftelsen Spydeberg prestegård) and he has been member of the executive board since 2011. Skulberg has therefore published the books Wilse - The Humanist and his Lab and Pax Scandinavica. The epoch-making events in Østfold during August 1814.

== Recognition ==
Skulberg has been awarded The Wilse medal in 2014.

== Publications ==
• Spydeberg kommune 2003: Folk og hjem på gamle og nye tomter. Bind 1. Hovedredaktør og medforfatter. ISBN 82-996630-1-6. pp 184.

• Østfold Fylkeskommune 2009: Pax scandinavica. Hendelsene i Østfold i augustdagene 1814. ISBN 829 1932514. pp 38.

• Alveng Dag & Skulberg P.K. (2015): Wilse - Humanisten og hans laboratorium/The Humanist and his Lab. Oktober forlag. ISBN 978-82-495-1357-4. pp 120.

• Lancet. 1986 Apr 19;1(8486):872-5. (medforfatter) Enalapril, atenolol, and hydrochlorothiazide in mild to moderate hypertension. A comparative multicentre study in general practice in Norway.

• Scandinavian Journal of Pain 2016:Jørum E, Kleggetveit PI, Skulberg PK. Complex regional pain syndrome following viper-bite. Scand J Pain 2016;10:15-18 a Section of Clinical Neurophysiology, Dept of Neurology, Oslo University Hospital-Rikshospitalet, Oslo, Norway, Askim Medical Center, Askim, Norway.
