= Lars Skytøen =

Norwegian politician (1929–2016)

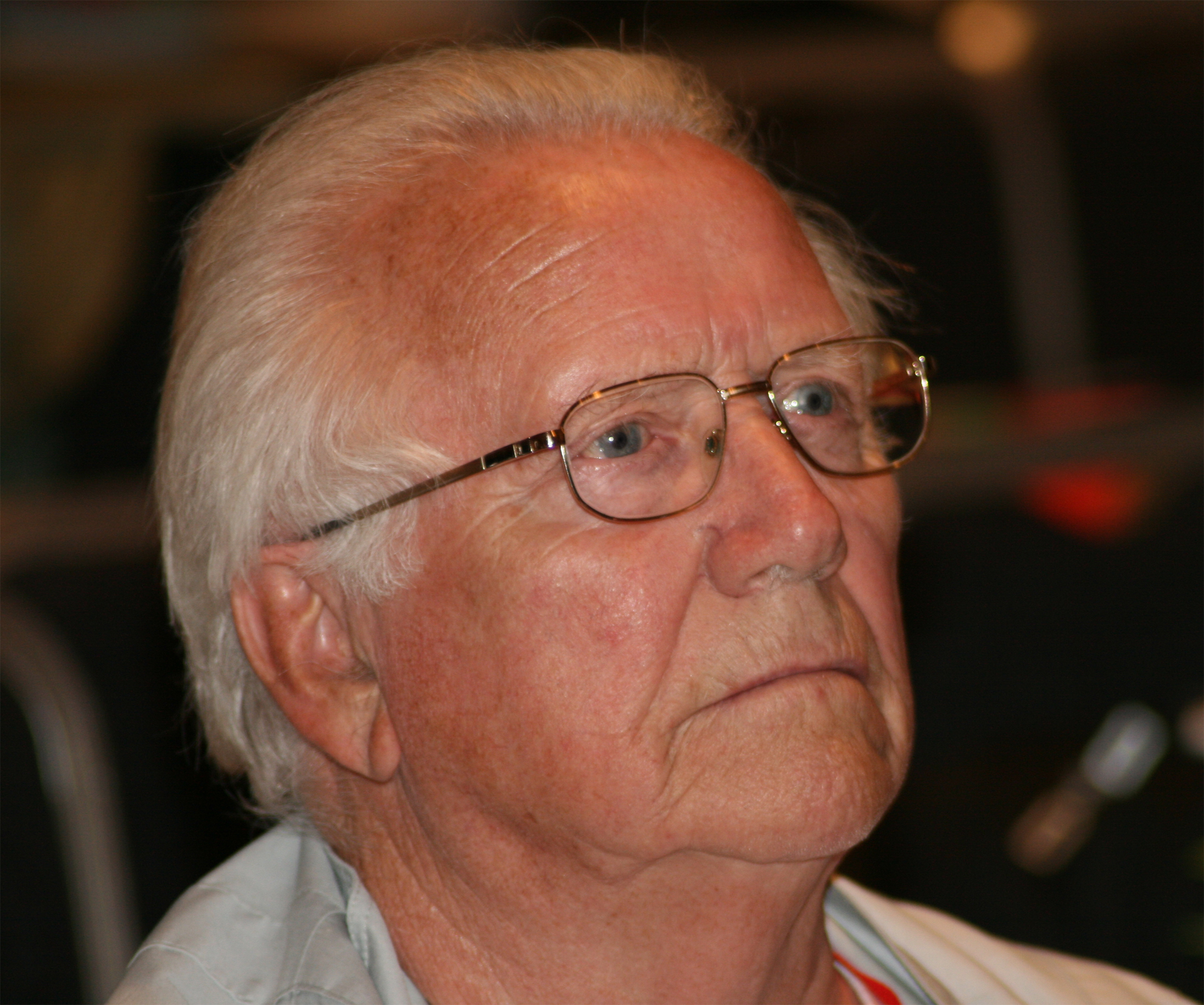
Lars Skytøen in 2009

Lars Mauritz Skytøen (13 December 1929 – 11 June 2016) was a Norwegian politician for the Labour Party. He was Minister of Industry and Craft 1979–1981.
