= Barbara Mauritzen =

British veteran

Barbara Dagmar Mauritzen (later Baker, c. 1925 – 6 May 2011) was a member of the WRNS during World War II and was posted to HMS Pembroke 5 (billeted at Woburn Abbey).

Mauritzen was the daughter of Karl Mauritzen, a Danish immigrant. She was one of the female operators first of the Robinson and then Colossus decoding computers under Max Newman (in the Newmanry) at Bletchley Park, having been sent there at the age of 18. Following VE Day, her retraining in Japanese was cut short by the Japanese capitulation.

After demobilisation she returned to Edinburgh to work in her family's shipping business. In 2009, Baker was living in the Scottish Borders and gave an interview about her experiences at Bletchley Park. She died after a short illness in Galashiels, Scottish Borders in May 2011 at the age of 85.
