= Ole Knapp =

Norwegian politician

Ole Knapp (8 November 1931 – 4 November 2015) was a Norwegian politician for the Labour Party. Born in Gjøvik in 1931, Knapp became Minister of Industry in 1990, serving until 1992.
