= Jan P. Syse =

Norwegian politician (1930–1997)

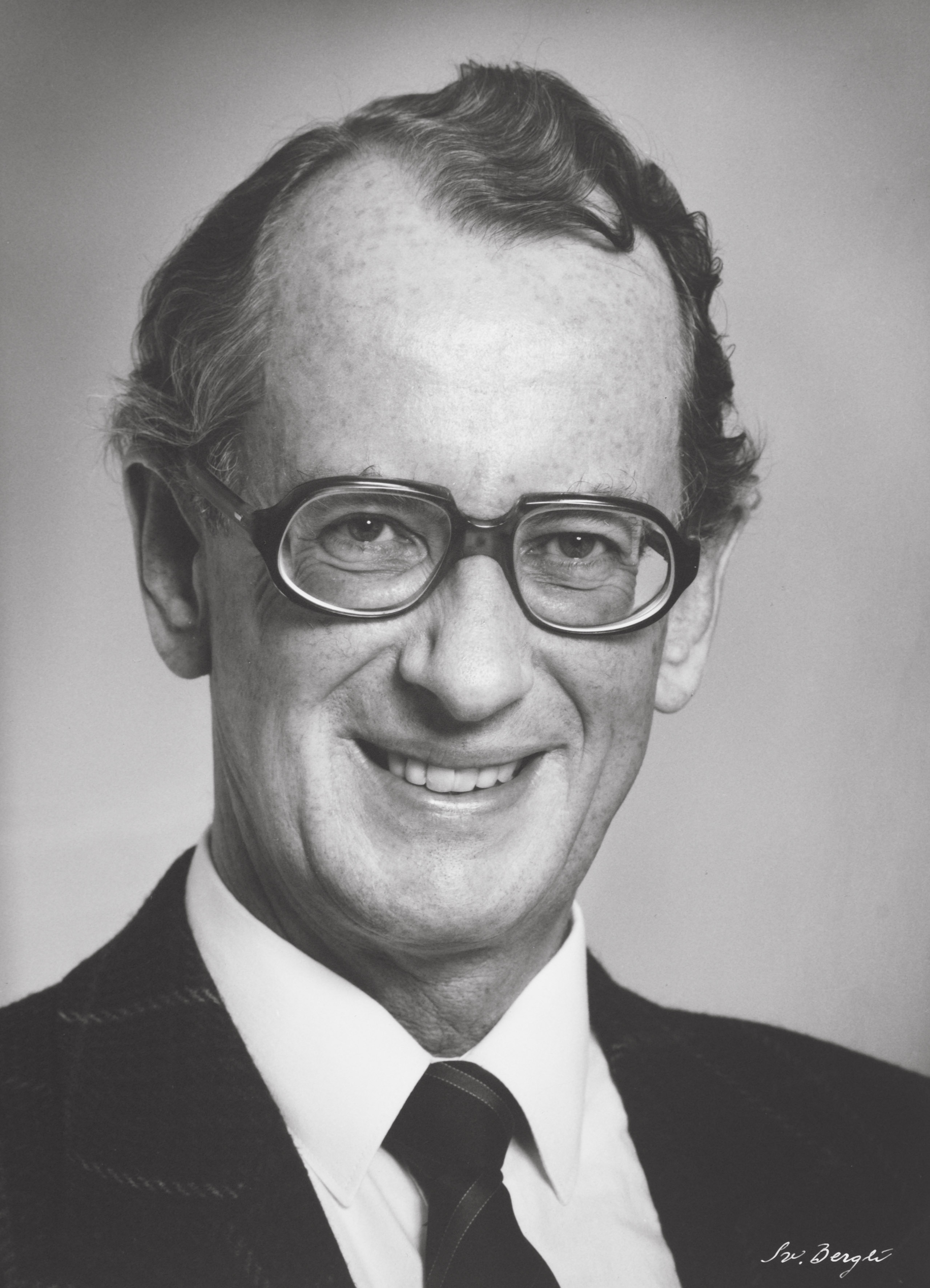
- Jan Peder Syse in the late 1980s or early 1990s

Prime Minister of Norway
- In office 16 October 1989 – 3 November 1990
- Monarch: Olav V^{[a]}
- Preceded by: Gro Harlem Brundtland
- Succeeded by: Gro Harlem Brundtland

President of the Nordic Council
- In office 1 January 1988 – 31 December 1988
- Preceded by: Elsi Hetemäki-Olander
- Succeeded by: Karin Söder
- In office 1 January 1993 – 31 December 1993
- Preceded by: Ilkka Suominen
- Succeeded by: Sten Andersson

Leader of the Conservative Party
- In office 22 January 1988 – 20 April 1991
- First Deputies: Wenche Frogn Sellæg; Astrid Nøklebye Heiberg
- Second Deputies: Petter Thomassen; Svein Ludvigsen
- Preceded by: Kaci Kullmann Five
- Succeeded by: Kaci Kullmann Five

Minister of Trade and Energy
- In office 16 September 1983 – 4 October 1985
- Prime Minister: Kåre Willoch
- Preceded by: Jens-Halvard Bratz
- Succeeded by: Petter Thomassen

Conservative Parliamentary Leader
- In office 4 October 1985 – 30 September 1989
- Leader: Erling Norvik; Rolf Presthus; Himself
- Preceded by: Jo Benkow
- Succeeded by: Anders Talleraas

Member of the Norwegian Parliament
- In office 1 October 1973 – 17 September 1997
- Constituency: Oslo

President of the Lagting
- In office 11 October 1993 – 17 September 1997
- Preceded by: Hans J. Røsjorde
- Succeeded by: Odd Holten

State Secretary for the Ministry of Justice and the Police
- In office 1 November 1970 – 17 March 1971
- Prime Minister: Per Borten
- Minister: Egil Endresen

Personal details
- Born: 25 November 1930 Nøtterøy, Vestfold, Norway
- Died: 17 September 1997 (aged 66) Uranienborg, Oslo, Norway
- Party: Conservative
- Spouse: Else Walstad (m. 1959)
- Children: Christian Syse; Henrik Syse
- Parent(s): Peter Syse; Magnhild Bjønnes
- Education: University of Oslo
- a. Crown Prince Harald served as regent from 1 June 1990.

Jan Peder Syse (Norwegian pronunciation; 25 November 1930 – 17 September 1997) was a Norwegian lawyer and politician from the Conservative Party. He was the prime minister of Norway from 1989 to 1990. He also served as the minister of Industry from 1983 to 1985. Syse was the president of the Lagting from 1993 to 1997. Syse was the president of the Nordic Council in 1988 and 1993. He served in the Norwegian parliament for over 25 years until his sudden death from a cerebral hemorrhage in 1997.

== Early life and career ==
Syse was born in Nøtterøy Municipality in Vestfold county. He was the son of Peter Syse (1890–1965) and Magnhild Bjønnes (1898–1983). His father was a local politician and dental surgeon. He earned his examen artium in 1949 and his degree in law in 1957. He was politically active as a student, serving as chair of Den Konservative Studenterforening, Det Norske Studentersamfund, and the construction committee for Chateau Neuf.

His initial professional experience was as an attorney and manager for the deep sea shipping company Wilh. Wilhelmsen. He worked for Wilhelmsen at various times throughout his career, and was also employed as the editor for Wilhelmsen's newsletter, Skib-rederi.

Jan P. Syse met Else Walstad (1936–2021) while they both were students at the University of Oslo in 1955, and they were married in 1959. They had two sons, philosopher Henrik Syse and diplomat Christian Syse.

== Political career ==
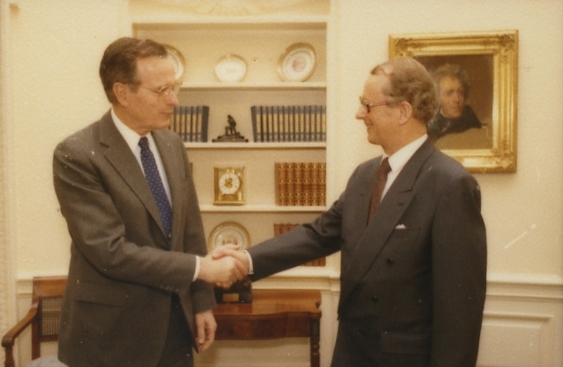
Syse with US President George H. W. Bush in 1990

After being a member of the national council for the Conservative Party since 1957, he started his elected political career in 1963 when he was elected to the municipal council of Oslo Municipality, where he served two terms.

He was elected into the Storting as a deputy representative in 1965. He started his term as a full voting member in 1969 to replace Kåre Willoch who was a member of Borten's Cabinet. Syse served on the Judiciary, Administration, Finance, extended Foreign Affairs and Constitution, and Constitutional committees throughout his parliamentary career. He was also sent as a parliamentary delegate to the United Nations General Assembly, Nordic Council, Inter-Parliamentary Union, and other international bodies. Syse was State Secretary to the Ministry of Justice from 1 November 1970 to 17 March 1971 in the non-Socialist coalition government led by Per Borten. He was Minister of Industry in the second cabinet Willoch from 16 September 1983 to 4 October 1985, and prime minister with the Syse Cabinet from 16 October 1989 to 3 November 1990.

== Political legacy ==
Syse was well liked and respected among political allies and adversaries alike. He worked for cooperation within the Nordic region and also to strengthen the cooperation with the Baltic states, although he opposed their wish to join the Nordic council. His sons Christian Syse and Henrik Syse published Ta ikke den ironiske tonen - tanker og taler av Jan P. Syse (Oslo, Forlaget Press, 2003), a book that describes Syse's speeches and style.

== Other sources ==
- Borgen, Per Otto (1999) Norges statsministre (Oslo: Aschehoug) ISBN 82-03-22389-3

Political offices
Preceded by Gro Harlem Brundtland	Prime Minister of Norway; 1989–1990	Succeeded by Gro Harlem Brundtland
Preceded by Jens-Halvard Bratz	Minister of Trade and Industry; 1983–1985	Succeeded by Petter Thomassen
Preceded by Hans J. Røsjorde	President of the Lagting; 1993–1997	Succeeded by Odd Holten
Preceded by Kaci Kullmann Five	Leader of the Conservative Party; 1988–1991	Succeeded by Kaci Kullmann Five
