= List of aluminium smelters =

This is a list of primary aluminium smelters in the world. Primary production is the process by which alumina is smelted to pure aluminum. Secondary production is the process of recycling aluminum scrap into aluminum that can be used again. Capacity here refers to metric tonnes of output aluminum. The list is incomplete and missing some data.

| Country | Location | Total annual capacity (tonnes) | Ownership | Status |
|---|---|---|---|---|
| Argentina | Puerto Madryn | 460,000 | Aluar (Aluminio Argentino) | |
| Australia | Boyne Island | 570,000 | Rio Tinto (Boyne Smelters Limited) | |
| Australia | Tomago | 590,000 | Tomago Aluminium Company Pty. Ltd. | Rio Tinto 51.55%, Gove Aluminium Finance Ltd 36.05%, Hydro Aluminium 12.40% |
| Australia | Portland, Victoria | 358,000 | Alcoa World Alumina Australia Ltd. - Portland Aluminium | March 15, 2023 - Production at the smelter will be reduced to approximately 75 percent of the site’s total consolidated capacity of 358,000 metric tons per year (mtpy). Alcoa’s share of the total capacity is 197,000 mtpy. The smelter, which has a total of 408 pots, had previously been operating at about 95 percent of its total capacity. |
| Australia | Kurri Kurri | 180,000 | Hydro Aluminium, part of Norsk Hydro | Closed September 2012 |
| Australia | Bell Bay, Tasmania | 180,000 | Rio Tinto (Bell Bay Aluminium) | |
| Azerbaijan | Ganja | 50,000 | Ganja Aluminium | |
| Bahrain | Askar | 1,540,000 | Alba (Aluminium Bahrain) | |
| Bosnia and Herzegovina | Mostar | 180,000 | Aluminij | Part of the M.T. Abraham Group |
| Brazil | Barcarena | 460,000 | Albras (Alumínio Brasileiro S.A.) | |
| Brazil | São Luís | 460,000 | Alumar(Consórcio de Alumínio do Maranhão S.A.) | Joint venture, 40% BHP Billiton, operated by Alcoa. Curtailed since 2015. |
| Brazil | Aluminio | 455,000 | Companhia Brasileira de Aluminio (CBA) | |
| Brazil | Ouro Preto | 150,000 | 66.67% Hindustan Aluminium, 33.33% Novelis | |
| Brazil | Poços de Caldas | 106,000 | Alcominas (Alcoa Aluminio S.A.) | Closed and dismantled |
| Brazil | Santa Cruz | 95,000 | Metalisul (Grupo Metalis) | Closed and dismantled |
| Brazil | Saramenha | 51,000 | Novelis do Brasil S.A. | Closed and dismantled |
| Cameroon | Edéa | 100,000 | Alucam (Compagnie Camerounaise de l'Aluminium) | |
| Canada | Sept-Iles, Quebec | 606,000 | Aluminerie Alouette Inc. | Alouette is a consortium of AMAG Austria Metall AG (20%), Hydro Aluminium (20%), Investissement Québec (6.67%), Marubeni Corporation (13.33%) and Rio Tinto (40%). |
| Canada | Alma, Quebec | 466,000 | Rio Tinto | |
| Canada | Bécancour | 437,000 | A.B.I. (Aluminerie de Bécancour Incorporée) | JV 74.9% Alcoa (operated by Alcoa), and 25.1% Rio Tinto |
| Canada | Kitimat | 420,000 | Rio Tinto | |
| Canada | Baie Comeau | 300,000 | Alcoa Aluminerie de Baie-Comeau | |
| Canada | Deschambault | 260,000 | Alcoa Aluminerie de Deschambault | |
| Canada | Laterrière, Quebec | 244,000 | Rio Tinto | |
| Canada | Grande Baie, Saguenay, Quebec | 221,000 | Rio Tinto | |
| Canada | Arvida, Saguenay, Quebec | 173,000 | Rio Tinto | |
| China | Hongjun | 1,060,000 | Huomei Hongjun Aluminium Smelter | |
| China | Xinjiang | 860,000 | Xinjiang Easthope Coal Power & Aluminium | |
| China | Dongfang Xiwang | 780,000 | Dongfang Xiwang Aluminium Smelter Innermongolia | |
| China | Wujiaqu | 740,000 | Xinfa Group | |
| China | Lanzhou Shi | 700,000 | Lanzhou Aluminium Smelter | |
| China | Qingtongxia Shi | 685,000 | Qingtongxia Aluminum Co. | |
| China | East Hope (Sanmenxia) | 650,000 | | |
| China | Baotou Shi | 1,340,000 | Baotou Aluminum Factory (Chinalco) | |
| China | Yugang Longquan | 600,000 | Henan Yugang Longquan Aluminium Co. Ltd. | |
| China | Nongliushi | 590,000 | Nongliushi Smelter Xinjiang | |
| China | Qinghai Xinye | 575,000 | Qinghai Xinye Aluminium Smelter | |
| China | Chiping Xinfa | 550,000 | Shandong Xinfa Aluminium Co. | |
| China | Henan Wanji | 530,000 | Henan Wanji Aluminum Co. Ltd. | |
| China | Qinghai Huanghe | 500,000 | Qinghai Huanghe Aluminium Company | |
| China | Qinghai Xinheng | 500,000 | Qinghai Xinheng Aluminium Plant | |
| China | Qinyang | 500,000 | Henan Qinyang Aluminium Power | |
| China | Yongchen City | 500,000 | Yongchen Aluminium | |
| China | Yunnan | 500,000 | Yunnan Aluminium Co. Ltd. | |
| China | Zhonghe | 495,000 | Zhonghe Group | |
| China | Qinghai | 420,000 | Qinghai Aluminium Plant (Chinalco) | |
| China | Guanyuan Aostar | 420,000 | Sichuan Aostar Guangyuan Aluminium Smelter | |
| China | Jiaozuo Shi | 420,000 | Jiaozuo Wanfang Aluminium Smelter | |
| China | Shenhuo (new) | 420,000 | Henan Shenhuo Orient Aluminium Company | |
| China | Fukang | 413,000 | Xinjian Tianlong Mineral Co. Aluminium Smelter | |
| China | Guizhou | 400,000 | Guizhou Huaren(Chinalco) | |
| China | Nanshan | 406,000 | Shandong Nanshan Aluminum Co., Ltd. | |
| China | Nanshan | 400,000 | | |
| China | Wanji Xiangjiang | 400,000 | | |
| China | Yangquan | 400,000 | | |
| China | Baotou East Hope | 400,000 | Baotou Oriental Hope Aluminium Co | |
| China | Longquan Aluminium | 400,000 | Longquan Aluminium Smelter | |
| China | Qiya | 400,000 | Qiya Group | |
| China | Tianshan | 400,000 | Tianshan Group | |
| China | Xinjang Yihe | 400,000 | Xinjiang Yihe Aluminium Smelter | |
| China | Yichuan | 400,000 | Henan Hong KongYugang Longquan Aluminium Co., Ltd. | |
| China | Pingdingshan | 375,000 | | |
| China | Ningxia | 370,000 | Ningxia Jinjiang Group | |
| China | Xinjiang | 370,000 | Xinfa Group | |
| China | Zhongning | 370,000 | Zhongning Aluminium Smelter | |
| China | Emeishan | 355,000 | Emeishan Aluminium Industry Clique Co. Ltd. | |
| China | Emei | 350,000 | Sichuan Emei Aluminium Pant | |
| China | Fushun Shi | 350,000 | Fushun Aluminium Reduction Plant | |
| China | Jinning | 350,000 | Jinning Aluminium Co | |
| China | Qiaotou | 350,000 | Qiatou Aluminium Works | |
| China | Shanxi-Huaze | 350,000 | Shanxi-Huaze Aluminium & Power Co. | |
| China | Sichuan Qiya | 350,000 | Qiya Group | |
| China | Xiezhou | 330,000 | Xiezhou Aluminium Works | |
| China | Lubei | 320,000 | | |
| China | Guangxi Baise | 320,000 | Guangxi Baise Xinghe Smelter | |
| China | Zhongfu | 308,000 | Zhongfu Industry Group | |
| China | Datong Xian | 260,000 | Qinhai Aluminium Smelter | |
| China | Lanzhou Liancheng | 550,000 | Lanzhou Liancheng Aluminium Plant (Chinalco) | |
| China | Laibin Yinhai | 250,000 | Laibin Yinhai Aluminium Company | |
| China | Zunyi Xian | 242,000 | Zunyi Aluminium Works | |
| China | Gansu Longxi | 240,000 | Gansu Longxi Dongxing Smelter | |
| China | Guiyang Shi | 240,000 | Guiyang Aluminium Smelter | |
| China | Linzhou | 240,000 | Lifeng Aluminium Co. Ltd. | |
| China | Yunnan Dongyuan | 240,000 | Yunnan Dongyuan Smelter | |
| China | Guanlu (new) | 220,000 | Shanxi Guanlu Co. Ltd. | |
| China | Shanxian Hengkang | 220,000 | Shanxian Hengkang Smelter | |
| China | Yuncheng Shi | 220,000 | Shanxi Huasheng Aluminium Works | |
| China | Guixi Huayin | 200,000 | | |
| China | Wusheng (Pinglu) | 200,000 | | |
| China | Donghai | 200,000 | Shandong Donghai Aluminium Corp. | |
| China | Baise Yinhai | 175,000 | Baise Yinhai Aluminium Co | |
| China | Xinfa | 175,000 | Xinfa Xiwang Al & Power | |
| China | Jinxi | 160,000 | Xinfa Group | |
| China | Linfeng | 160,000 | Linfeng Aluminium | |
| China | Shenhuo (old) | 160,000 | Henan Shenhuo Aluminium Company | |
| China | Dingtai Tuoyuan | 150,000 | | |
| China | Yimei | 150,000 | | |
| China | Honglu Aluminium | 150,000 | Honglu Aluminium Co | |
| China | Tongshuan | 150,000 | Tongshuan Aluminium Smelter | |
| China | Zouping | 141,000 | Zouping Aluminium Smelter | |
| China | Pingguo Xian | 140,000 | Pingguo Aluminum Co. | |
| China | Ke'ao | 135,000 | Shandong Yankuang Ke-au Aluminium | |
| China | Meishan Qimingxing | 130,000 | Sichuan Meishan Qimingxin Aluminium Co | |
| China | Tianyuan | 130,000 | Tianyuan Aluminium Group | |
| China | Shangdian | 125,000 | Shangdian Aluminium Co. Ltd. | |
| China | Hejin Xian | 120,000 | Long Men Aluminum Plant | |
| China | Sanmenxia Shi | 120,000 | Sanmenxia Tianyuan Aluminum Co. | |
| China | Yulian Power | 120,000 | Henan Yulian Power Group. | |
| China | Zhengxing | 120,000 | Zhenxing Aluminium Smelter | |
| China | Guangyuan Qimingxing | 114,000 | Qimingxing Aluminium Co. | |
| China | Huasheng Jiangquan | 112,000 | Huasheng Jiangquan Aluminum Co. | |
| China | Guanlu (old) | 110,000 | Shanxi Guanlu Aluminium Plant | |
| China | Tongshuan Xinguang | 110,000 | Tongchuan Xinguang Aluminium Co. Ltd. | |
| China | Aba | 100,000 | Aba Aluminium Works | |
| China | Chuangyuan | 100,000 | Changyuan Aluminum Works | |
| China | Huayu | 100,000 | Huayu Aluminium Works | |
| China | Taiyuan Shi | 100,000 | Taiyuan Aluminium Works | |
| China | Yinhai | 100,000 | Yinhai Aluminium Co. | |
| China | Qinao | 90,000 | Qinao Aluminium Smelter | |
| China | Xichuan | 90,000 | Xichuan Ferro-Alloy Works | |
| China | Zhongmei | 83,000 | | |
| China | Huanghe | 80,000 | Huanghe Aluminum Co. | |
| China | Jinneng | 80,000 | Jinning Aluminium Smelter | |
| China | Mianchi Aluminium | 80,000 | Mianchi Aluminium Plant | |
| China | Shandong Aluminium | 200,000 | Shandong Aluminium Smelter (Chinalco) | Halted produced as of 31 December 2019 |
| China | Xinwang | 76,000 | Henan Xinwang Aluminium Co. Ltd. | |
| China | Nanping Shi | 73,000 | Nanping Aluminium Group | |
| China | Faxiang | 70,000 | Faxiang Aluminium Works | |
| China | Huadong | 70,000 | Huadong Aluminium Works | |
| China | Huaxin | 70,000 | Huaxin Aluminum Industries | |
| China | Zheijiang Huadong | 70,000 | Zhejiang Huadong Aluminium Co. Ltd. | |
| China | Yangquan | 68,000 | Shanxi Yangquan Aluminium Co. Ltd. | |
| China | Dengfeng | 65,000 | Dengfeng Aluminium Works | |
| China | Jilin | 65,000 | Jilin Aluminium Company | |
| China | Yungcheng Shanhe | 65,000 | Yungcheng Shanhe Aluminium Co. | |
| China | Yichang | 62,000 | Yichang Changjiang Aluminum Co., Ltd. | |
| China | Zhaofeng | 61,000 | Zhaofeng Aluminium Smelting Co | |
| China | Yangquan Shi | 60,000 | Yangquan Aluminium Works | |
| China | Yongan | 60,000 | Yongan Aluminum Co. | |
| China | Zhengzhuo Shi | 58,000 | Zhengzhuo Aluminium Smelter | |
| China | Chongqing Tiantai | 55,000 | Chongqing Aluminium Co | |
| China | Longxiang | 55,000 | Longxiang Aluminium Works | |
| China | Jiaokou | 50,000 | | |
| China | Chongqing Dongsheng | 50,000 | Dongsheng Aluminium Works | |
| China | Danjiankou Shi | 50,000 | Danjiangkou Water Conservancy Aluminium Factory | |
| China | Dianneng Gejiu | 50,000 | Dianneng Gejiu Aluminium Works | |
| China | Lintao | 50,000 | Lintao Aluminium Plant | |
| China | Longlin | 50,000 | Longlin Aluminium Smelter | |
| China | Ningxia | 50,000 | Ningxia St. Dehua | |
| China | Taian | 50,000 | Taian Aluminium Works | |
| China | Tongshun | 50,000 | Tongshun Aluminium Plant | |
| China | Yunnan Runxin | 50,000 | Yunnan Runxin Aluminium Works | |
| China | Haizhou | 40,000 | HaizhouAluminium Smelter | |
| China | Yunnan Yongxin | 35,000 | Yunnan Yongxin Metals Processing Co. | |
| China | Lanjiang Shi | 30,000 | Lanjiang Aluminium Works | |
| China | Pingyin | 26,000 | Shandong Pingyin Aluminium Plant | |
| China | Gongyi | 25,000 | Gongyi Aluminium Plant | |
| China | Panshi Xian | 25,000 | Panshi Aluminium Works | |
| China | Nanchuan | - | | |
| China | Shanxi | 432,000 | Shanxi Zhongrun (Chinalco) | |
| China | Shanxi | 424,000 | Shanxi New Material (Chinalco) | |
| China | Yunnan | - | | |
| China | Zunyi | 375,000 | Zunyi Aluminium (Chinalco) | |
| China | zhengzhou | 480,000 | Zhengzhou Laiwosi Aluminum Co., LTD | |
| Egypt | Nag Hammadi | 320,000 | Egyptalum (Aluminium Company of Egypt) | |
| France | Dunkerque | 284,000 in 2018 | ALVANCE | https://www.aluminiumdunkerque.fr/ |
| France | St. Jean de Maurienne | 141,000 | Trimet Aluminium SE 65%, EDF 35% | |
| Germany | Neuss | 230,000 | Speira GmbH | |
| Germany | Essen | 170,000 | Trimet Aluminium SE - Headquarters | |
| Germany | Hamburg | 135,000 | Trimet Aluminium SE | |
| Germany | Voerde | 96,000 | Trimet Aluminium SE | |
| Ghana | Tema | 200,000 | Valco (Volta Aluminium Company) | |
| Greece | St. Nicolas | 166,000 | Aluminium de Grèce SA (AdG) | |
| Guinea | Sangaredi | - | 33% Global Alumina, 33% BHP Billiton, 25% Dubai Aluminium Company Limited, 8.3% Mubadala Development Company PJSC | Currently in feasibility study |
| Iceland | Reyðarfjörður | 346,000 | Alcoa Fjarðaál | |
| Iceland | Grundartangi, near Akranes | 312,000 | Nordic Aluminum Co (Norðurál), subsidiary of Century Aluminum | Owned by Glencore International AG |
| Iceland | Straumsvík, near Hafnarfjörður | 205,000 | Rio Tinto | On 19 September 2018, Norsk Hydro backed out of its deal to buy Rio's Icelandic Smelter. |
| Iceland | Helguvíkurvegur, near Keflavík | 250,000 | Nordic Aluminum Co (Norðurál), subsidiary of Century Aluminum | Partially complete. Construction suspended in 2008. |
| India | Korba | 570,000 | Bharat Aluminium Co. (Balco) which is owned by Vedanta Resources | |
| India | Jharsuguda | 1,750,000 | Vedanta Resources | |
| India | Angul | 475,000 | National Aluminium Co. (Nalco) | |
| India | Kothapalem | 150,000 | Anrak Aluminium Co. | |
| India | Damanjodi | 475,000 | National Aluminium Co. (Nalco) | |
| India | Belgaum, Karnataka | 390,000 | Indal, Hindalco (United Nations 2000) | |
| India | Lapanga | 360,000 | Aditya Aluminium (Hindalco Industries Ltd)) | |
| India | Bargawan | 360,000 | Mahan Aluminium (Hindalco Industries Ltd)) | |
| India | Renukoot | 345,000 | Hindustan Aluminium Co. (Hindalco Industries Ltd)) | |
| India | Hirakud | 213,000 | Hindalco Industries Ltd. - Hirakud Smelter | |
| India | Doraguda | 300,000 | Hindalco Industries Ltd. - Utkal Aluminium International Limited | |
| Indonesia | Kuala Tanjung | 265,000 | PT Indonesia Asahan Aluminium (Persero) | Started as a consortium between 12 Japanese investors and the Indonesian Government. As of November 2013 it was entirely owned by the Indonesian Government. |
| Iran | Bandar Abbas (2) | 147,000 | Hormozgan Aluminium (Hormozal) | |
| Iran | Arak (2) | 110,000 | Iran Aluminium Co (Iralco) | |
| Iran | Bandar Abbas | 110,000 | Al-Mahdi Aluminium Corp. (AAC) | |
| Iran | Arak | 90,000 | Iran Aluminium Co (Iralco) | |
| Italy | Portoscuso | 159,000 | Alcoa Italia SpA-Portovesme Works | Closure announced by Alcoa (28 August 2014). |
| Japan | Kanbara, Shizuoka | 20,000 | Nippon Light Metals Co Ltd. | Closed in March 2014 |
| Japan | Ehime | - | 100% Sumitomo Chemical | |
| Kazakhstan | Pavlodar | 250,000 | Kazakhstan Aluminium Works (KAZ) | |
| Korea | Mopko | 180,000 | South Korea General Chemical Corporation | |
| Malaysia | Sarawak | 960,000 | Press Metal Bintulu | |
| Malaysia | Sarawak | 120,000 | Press Metal Sarawak | |
| Montenegro | Podgorica | 120,000 | DP Kombinat Aluminijuma Podgorica (KAP) | Shut down December 2021 |
| Mozambique | Maputo | 565,000 | Mozal (Mozambique Aluminium Smelter) | Joint venture of BHP Billiton 47.1%, Mitsubishi Corporation 25%, Industrial Development Corporation of South Africa Limited 24%, Government of Mozambique 3.9% BHP Billiton holdings now demerged to South32. |
| Netherlands | Delfzijl | 170,000 | Aluminium Delfzijl BV (Aldel) | Shut down September 2022 |
| Netherlands | Vlissingen-Oost | | Zalco BV | |
| New Zealand | Tiwai Point | 351,000 | New Zealand Aluminium Smelters (NZAS) | Rio Tinto 100%, Rio Tinto bought out Sumitomo's share in 2025. |
| Nigeria | Ikot Abasi | 200,000 | Alscon (Aluminium Smelter Co of Nigeria) | |
| Norway | Sunndalsøra | 400,000 | Sunndal Primary Production (Haas) | |
| Norway | Årdal | 233,000 | Årdal Primary Production (Haas) | |
| Norway | Mosjøen | 221,500 | Alcoa Norway - Mosjøen Works | |
| Norway | Karmøy | 190,000 | Karmøy Primary Production (Haas) | |
| Norway | Husnes | 185,000 | Hydro Husnes (Norsk Hydro) | |
| Norway | Lista | 127,500 | Alcoa Norway - Lista Works | One of three lines cut September 2022 |
| Norway | Høyanger | 60,000 | Høyanger Primary Production (Haas) | |
| Oman | Sohar | 372,000 | Sohar Aluminium Company | Oman Oil (40 per cent), Abu Dhabi National Energy Company PJSC – TAQA (40 per cent) and Rio Tinto (20 per cent) |
| Qatar | Mesaieed | 625,000 | Qatalum (Qatar Aluminium Co) | |
| Romania | Slatina | 288,000 | SC Alro SA Slatina | close 3 out of 5 furnaces |
| Russia | Komi Aluminium Project, Sosnogorsk, Komi Republic | 1,400,000 | United Company of Rusal (under construction) | |
| Russia | Bogoslovsk | 1,100,000 | 100% United Company of Rusal | |
| Russia | Bratsk | 1,010,000 | Bratsk Aluminium Works-BrAZ | |
| Russia | Krasnoyarsk | 1,008,000 | Krasnoyarsk Aluminium Works - KrAZ | |
| Russia | Ural Aluminium Smelter, Kamensk-Uralsky, Sverdlovsk Region | 750,000 | United Company of Rusal (United Nations 2000) | |
| Russia | Sayanogorsk | 542,000 | Sayan Aluminium Works - SaAZ | |
| Russia | Shelekhov | 415,000 | Irkutsk Aluminium Works - IrkAZ | |
| Russia | Volkhov Alumina | 400,000 | 100% North-West Aluminium (United Nations 2000) | |
| Russia | Novokuznetsk | 330,000 | Novokuznetsk Aluminium Works - NAZ | |
| Russia | Sayanogorsk II | 300,000 | Khakas Aluminium Works - KhAZ | |
| Russia | Krasnoturinsk | 190,000 | Bogoslovsk Aluminium Works-BAZ | |
| Russia | Bauxitogorsk | 186,000 | 100% United Company of Rusal | |
| Russia | Volgograd | 170,000 | Volgograd Aluminium Works - VgAZ | |
| Russia | Nadvoitsy | 80,000 | Nadvoitsy Aluminium Works - NkAZ | |
| Russia | Kamensk | 75,000 | Ural Aluminium Works -UAZ | |
| Russia | Kandalaksha | 75,000 | Kandalaksha Aluminium Works -KAZ | |
| Russia | Volkhov | 24,000 | Volkhov Aluminium Works - VAZ | |
| Russia | Taishet | 10,000 | Thaishet Aluminium Works - ThAZ | |
| Saudi Arabia | Ras Al-Khair | 780,000 | Ma’aden Aluminium Company (MAC) | Jun 26, 2019 : Alcoa has 25.1% interest in Ma’aden Aluminium Company (MAC), which owns and operates the Aluminium smelter and in Ma’aden Bauxite and Alumina Company (MBAC), which owns and operates the bauxite mine in Al Ba’itha and the alumina refinery both in Ras Al Khair Industrial City. |
| Slovakia | Ziar nad Hronom | 160,000 | Slovak Aluminium Co - Slovalco | shut down September 2022 |
| Slovenia | Kidricevo | 75,000 | Talum dd Kidricevo | reduced production by 80% in September 2022, stopped completely April 2023 |
| South Africa | Richards Bay, Hillside | 720,000 | Hillside Aluminium | |
| South Africa | Richards Bay, Bayside | 100,000 | Bayside Aluminium | Closed |
| Spain | San Ciprian | 250,000 | Alcoa Inespal - San Ciprian Works | Curtailed 2020 |
| Spain | Aviles | 93,000 | Alcoa Inespal- Aviles Works | Closed 02/2019 |
| Spain | La Coru?a | 87,000 | Alcoa Inespal- La Coruna Works | Closed 02/2019 |
| Suriname | Paranam/Onverwacht | 57,000 | Suralco | Closed |
| Sweden | Sundsvall | 130,000 | Kubikenborg Aluminium AB (Kubal) | |
| Tajikistan | Tursunzoda | 450,000 | Tajikistan Aluminium Company (Talco) | |
| Turkey | Seydisehir Alumina | 200,000 | 100% Eti Holding S.A. (United Nations 2000) | |
| Turkey | Seydisehir | 65,000 | Eti Alüminyum Inc | |
| UAE | Jebel Ali, Dubai | 1,040,000 | Emirates Global Aluminium (EGA) | In 2013, Dubal (Dubai Aluminium Co) and Emal (Emirates Aluminium) were merged to form Emirates Global Aluminium (EGA). |
| UAE | Al Taweelah, Abu Dhabi | 1,500,000 | Emirates Global Aluminium (EGA) | In 2013, Dubal (Dubai Aluminium Co) and Emal (Emirates Aluminium) were merged to form Emirates Global Aluminium (EGA). |
| Ukraine | Zaporozhye Aluminium Combine, Zaporozhye City | 270,000 | United Company of Rusal | |
| Ukraine | Zaporozhye | 120,000 | Zaporizhsky Alyuminievy Kominat (Zalk) | |
| United Kingdom | Burntisland | 120,000 | 100% Rio Tinto Alcan | Closed 2002 |
| United Kingdom | Lochaber smelter, Fort William | 42,000 | Alvance British Aluminium | Formerly owned by Rio Tinto, sold in 2016 to GFG Alliance. Last remaining aluminium smelter in the UK |
| United Kingdom | Anglesey smelter, Holyhead | 142,000 | Rio Tinto - Kaiser Aluminum - Anglesey Smelter | Closed 2009 |
| United Kingdom | Lynemouth smelter, Lynemouth | - | 100% Rio Tinto Alcan | Closed 2012 |
| USA | Newburgh | 270,000 | Alcoa - Warrick Operations | 1 Potline Curtailed June 2022, 2 potlines still operating. |
| USA | Mount Holly | 224,000 | Century Aluminum | Operating at 50% of capacity. |
| USA | Sebree | 218,000 | Century Aluminum | |
| USA | Massena | 135,000 | Alcoa - Massena Operations | |
| USA | New Madrid | 263,000 | Magnitude7Metals | previously Noranda Aluminum, now owned by Swiss-based Granges Curtailed January 2024 |
| USA | Hawesville | 250,000 | Century Aluminum of Kentucky LLC | Curtailed 7/2022, site sold for redevelopment 2/3/2026 |
| USA | Ferndale | 279,000 | Alcoa - Intalco Aluminum Corp. | Curtailed 8/26/2020. March 15, 2023 Alcoa Announces Closure of Intalco Smelter and Prepares Site for Redevelopment |
| USA | Wenatchee | 184,000 | Alcoa - Wenatchee Works | Curtailed 2016, Closed 2018, dismantled |
| USA | Columbia Falls | 180,000 | Glencore AG (Switzerland) | Closed 2009, dismantled |
| USA | Ravenswood | 180,000 | Century Aluminum of West Virginia Inc. (RAC) | Closed |
| USA | Hannibal | 270,000 | Ormet Primary Aluminum Corporation | Closed |
| USA | Rockdale | 176,000 | Alcoa - Rockdale Works | Closed |
| USA | Goldendale | 172,000 | Goldendale Aluminum Co | Closed 2003, dismantled |
| USA | St. Lawrence | 125,000 | Alcoa - St. Lawrence Reduction | Closed |
| USA | Badin | 150,000 | Alcoa - Badin Works | Closed |
| Venezuela | Matanzas | 448,000 | CVG Venalum | |
| Venezuela | Matanzas | 170,000 | Alcasa (Aluminios del Caroni C.A.) | |
| Vietnam | Lam Dong Project | 650,000 | Pechiney, CAV | |

== See also ==
- List of alumina refineries
- List of countries by aluminium production
