= Barcarena =

Barcarena may refer to:

- Barcarena (Oeiras), a parish in the municipality of Oeiras, Portugal
- Barcarena, Pará, Brazil
