= Qatalum =

Aluminum smelter plant in Qatar

Qatalum is an aluminium smelter plant located in Mesaieed Industrial Area that is a joint venture between QatarEnergy and Norsk Hydro.

== History ==
ABB Group was awarded with a $140 million contract by Qatalum in 2007 to construct the electrical parts of the plant. The $5.7 billion plant was finished on time and on cost in 25 months and produced its first hot metal on 20 December 2009. The smelter was modeled after Hydro's 238,800 mtpa Sunndal 4 smelter, which began production in Norway in 2004. Quatalum's smelter consisted of 704 pots in two potlines, each 1,150 meters long. It had a 60 mtph paste plant and 340,000 mpta anode baking plant, while the casthouse could handle 640,000 mtpa. Of the total cost $3.1 billion was funded from equity and $2.6bn from 16.5-year bank loans dated August 2007. While rated at 585,000mtpa, the smelter was producing more than 650,000mtpa in 2018. A map of the facility is shown in: The HAL275 type pots are rated at 300kA, and reached 340kA by 2024. Qatalum entered into a 25-year gas supply contract with Qatar Petroleum commencing 23 August 2007 with an option to extend by 15 years. Alumina was provided through Hydro's long-term supply arrangements and until 2019 Glencore provided some alumina to Qatalum, after which Qatalum had to find new suppliers besides Hydro. Hyro distributed and marketed 100% of the production of Qatalum for 25 years beginning 18 December 2009 (the arrangement was cancelled in 2026). Qatar Aluminium Limited Q.S.C was incorporated on 26 July 2007 in Qatar with an authorized capital of 400 million shares ($10 par).

The Qatar Aluminium Manufacturing Company Q.P.S.C. was established as a public company on 15 October 2018 with an issued capital of 558 million shares (par value QAR 10). 273 million shares (49%) were sold at par to the public in an IPO lasting from 30 October and 12 November and the stock began trading on the Qatar Stock Exchange on 10 December 2018. Qatar Petroleum received 51% of the stock and all proceeds of the public offering in exchange for its 50% stake in Qatalum. Effective 9 July 2019 all 46 companies listed on the Qatar Exchange completed a 10-for-1 stock split (new par value is QAR 1).

Inaugurated in April 2010, it was the largest aluminium plant ever launched in one step, costing about $5.7 billion to build. In 2012, ABB was contracted to upgrade the plants power network for $16 million. Its annual capacity in September 2011 was 585,000 metric tons of primary aluminium, all to be shipped as value added aluminium casthouse products. A 1350 MW natural gas power plant has also been built to ensure a stable supply of electricity. In 2013, Qatalum and Hydro Aluminium opened a new zero energy and emissions building lab at the Mesaieed Industrial City site, for the development of aluminium cladding for carbon neutral buildings.

Following the outbreak of the 2026 Iran war and a natural gas supply crisis, Qatalum began a controlled shutdown on 3 March 2026. Qatalum on 12 March said that enough gas was available to continue operations at 60% of capacity. Production for Q1 2026 was 158,000 tonnes and for Q2 92,000 tonnes. 60% of 687,000 (2025) divided by 4 would equal 103,050 tonnes expected per quarter production.

Production (metric tons)
2010	125,177
2011	486,789
2012	627,971
2013	634,351
2014	640,153
2015	638,155
2016	643,514
2017
2018	697,000
2019	704,000
2020	655,000
2021	662,000
2022	666,000
2023	677,000
2024	682,000
2025	687,000

Qatar Aluminium Extrusion Company (25.15265°N 51.3932°E) qalex.com.qa

Profession Aluminium Company (25.1452°N 51.4°E) profession-alu.com

== See also ==
- Norway–Qatar relations
