= Mestre Vieira =

Brazilian musician and instrumentalist

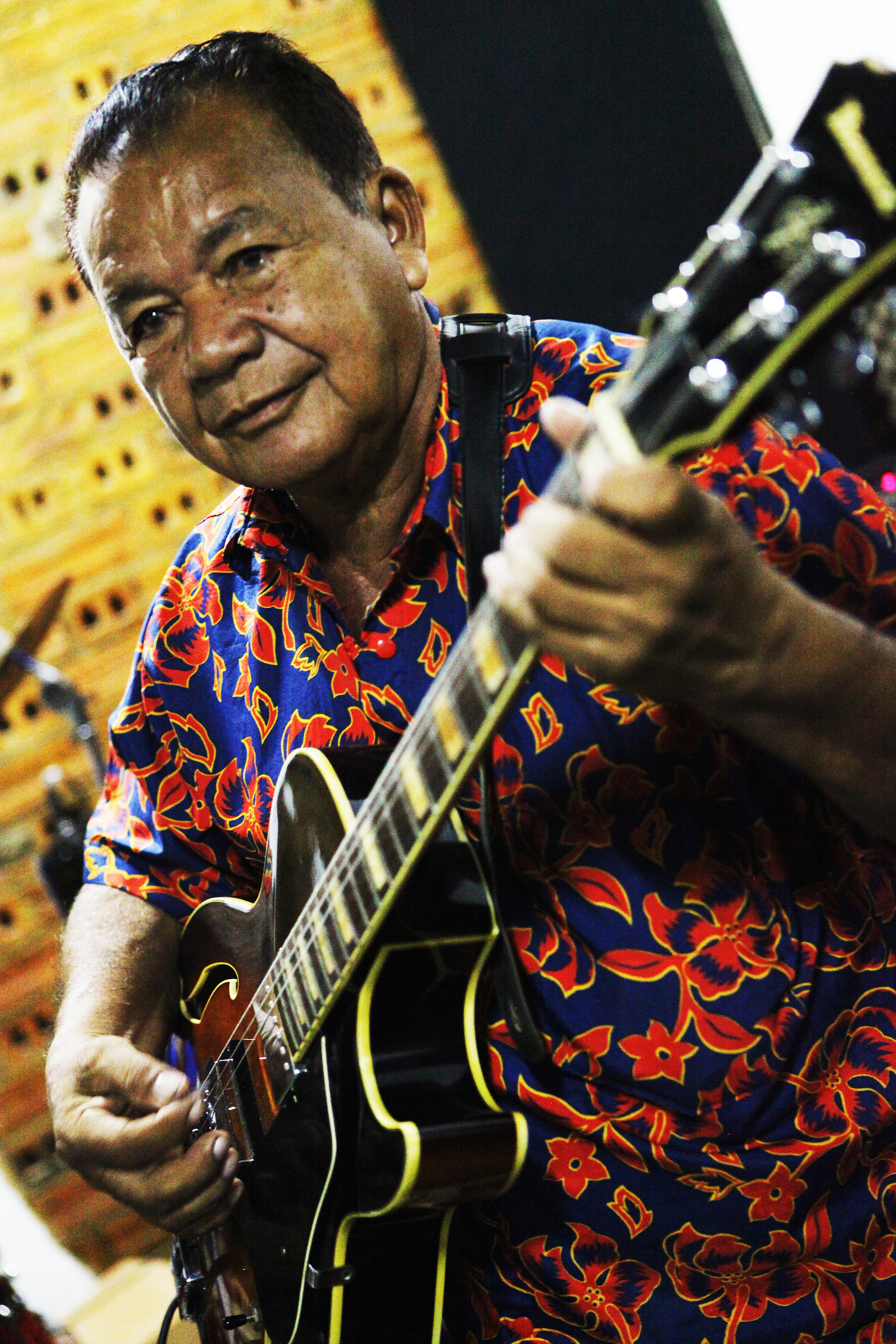
- Vieira in 2011

Background information
- Born: Joaquim de Lima Vieira; October 29, 1934; Barcarena, Pará, Brazil
- Died: February 2, 2018 (aged 83) Barcarena, Pará, Brazil
- Genres: Guitarrada; lambada; brega; carimbó; bolero; cumbia; merengue; mambo
- Instruments: Electric guitar; banjo; cavaquinho; classical guitar; bandolim
- Years active: 1948–2018

Joaquim de Lima Vieira, better known as Mestre Vieira (October 29, 1934 – February 2, 2018), was a Brazilian musician and instrumentalist, creator of the guitarrada, a musical genre that was the precursor to lambada.

== Biography ==
Joaquim de Lima Vieira was born on October 29, 1934, in Barcarena, Pará, the son of the Portuguese Zacarias Pinto Vieira and the Pará native Sophia Rosa de Lima Vieira. As a child, he accompanied his older brothers who played in samba circles.

At the age of 5, he learned to play the banjo and, at 14, the bandolim, even winning a competition for Best Soloist in Pará, at Rádio Clube, in Belém. Later, Vieira also learned to play the cavaquinho and guitar. At this time, in the early 1960s, he formed his first regional group. In the second half of the 1960s, he discovered the electric guitar, having included it in his group that was named Os Dinâmicos.

In 1978, his group, which was already called Vieira e Seu Conjunto, released the LP Lambadas das Quebradas, continuing to release more LPs until 1991.

In 2003, Vieira reappears on the music scene with Os Mestres da Guitarrada, a project resulting from the research of musician, researcher and music producer Pio Lobato. In 2008, he recorded and released a new CD, Guitarrada Magnética, resuming his solo career. In 2012, he recorded the DVD Mestre Vieira 50 Anos de Guitarrada, live at Theatro da Paz, and in 2015, the CD Guitarreiro do Mundo.

He received the Order of Cultural Merit in 2008 from the Ministry of Culture for his outstanding service to Brazilian culture.

Mestre Vieira died on February 2, 2018 in Barcarena, at the age of 83, a victim of prostate cancer.

== Discography ==
- Lambada das Quebradas (1978)
- Lambada das Quebradas Vol II (1980)
- Lambada das Quebradas Vol III (1981)
- Melô da Cabra (1982)
- Lambadas e Quebradas – Lima o Guitarreiro do Amazonas (1982)
- Desafiando (1983)
- Vieira e seu Conjunto (1984)
- Vieira e seu Conjunto (1985)
- Bota fogo nela (1986)
- Vieira e Seu Conjunto (1987)
- Melô da Pomba (1989)
- Lambadas e Cambarás (1990)
- 40 Graus (1991)
- A Volta (1998)
- Lambadão do Vieira (2002)
- Guitarra Magnética (2009)
- DVD ao vivo Mestre Vieira 50 anos de Guitarrada (2013)
- Guitarreiro do Mundo (2015)
- Mestres da Guitarrada (2004)
- Música Magneta – Mestres da Guitarrada (2008)
