= Norway–Qatar relations =

- Norway: Qatar

Norway–Qatar relations are the bilateral and diplomatic relations between Norway and Qatar. While neither country has an embassy in the other—Norway has an embassy in Abu Dhabi, whereas Qatar has an embassy in Stockholm—the economic relations are more significant.

The company Norsk Hydro was one of the first Norwegian companies to invest in Qatar, being a co-founder and co-owner of Qatar Fertiliser Company (Qafco) from 1969. The fertilizer division of Norsk Hydro became Yara International in 2004. The remaining division of Norsk Hydro, concerning aluminum production, co-founded Qatalum (together with QatarEnergy) in 2010. Crown Prince Haakon was the highest Norwegian representative present at the opening. Qatar has also received visits among others from the Norwegian Minister of Petroleum and Energy.

Diplomatic relations between the two countries were established in 1973. For the time being, Norway posted an ambassador in Abu Dhabi with a side accreditation to Qatar.

Qatar Airways opened flights to Oslo in 2011.

A major acceleration of relations and awareness of Qatar happened when Qatar was awarded the 2019 World Athletics Championships and the 2022 FIFA World Cup. Human rights in Qatar were sharply criticized, and boycott of the World Cup was widely debated in the sports world.

In the end, the Football Association of Norway chose a non-boycott standpoint, and stated to uphold a multilateral dialogue, mainly with Qatar, FIFA and Amnesty International. On 22 November 2021, the first arrests of Norwegian citizens happened in Qatar. The NRK journalist Halvor Ekeland and photographer Lokman Ghorbani were put in a holding cell, prompting the Government of Norway to lead an "intense dialogue with the authorities of Qatar". The Qatar critic Håvard Melnæs travelled to Qatar a few days after, and was arrested as well, being held for a short time. Norway's Minister of Culture (and sports) stated that the Government of Norway would send no official representatives to the 2022 World Cup; though Norway was not qualified for the tournament either.

== See also ==
- Foreign relations of Norway
- Foreign relations of Qatar
- Qatar–Sweden relations, which are of a similar nature
