= Svein Richard Brandtzæg =

Norwegian business executive and chemist (born 1957)

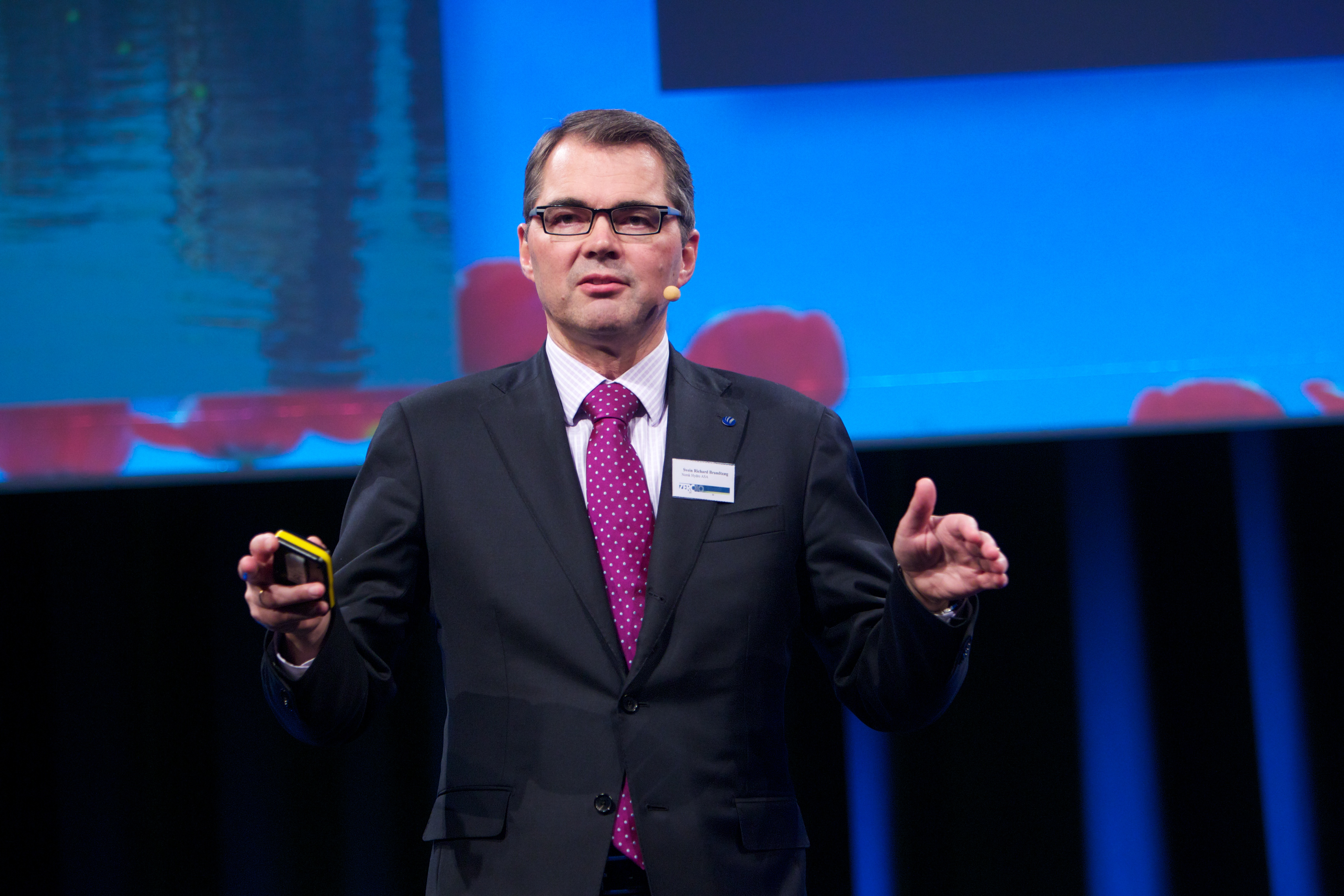
- Born: 23 December 1957 (age 68); Haugesund
- Education: Norwegian University of Science and Technology
- Occupation: Chairman of Norsk Hydro

Svein Richard Brandtzæg (born 23 December 1957, in Haugesund) is a Norwegian chemist and business executive.

Brandtzæg has a PhD in Chemistry from the Norwegian University of Science and Technology in Trondheim. He also has a graduate business degree from BI Norwegian Business School. He has worked at Norsk Hydro since 1979, working on Søderberg aluminum cell technology in Karmøy Municipality. In 1985, he joined the state-owned aluminum company Årdal og Sunndal Verk (ÅSV) when it merged with Norsk Hydro, and since then has held a number of leadership positions in the aluminum division of Norsk Hydro. He was appointed CEO of Norsk Hydro on 12 January 2009 after Eivind Reiten chose to resign from the position. He took over management of the company on April 1.

On 1 January 2014, Brandtzæg was appointed chairman at NTNU, by Per-Kristian Foss, who vacated the position upon becoming Auditor General. Brandtzæg is a fellow of the Norwegian Academy of Technological Sciences.

In his capacity as CEO of Norsk Hydro, Brandtzæg is a member of the European Round Table of Industrialists, a lobbying group of Europe's largest industrial companies. Brandtzæg is a member of the Bilderberg Conference. In 2019 he was succeeded as chief executive officer of Norsk Hydro by Hilde Merete Aasheim.

He is married and has three children.
