= National Industri =

Norwegian electrotechnical company

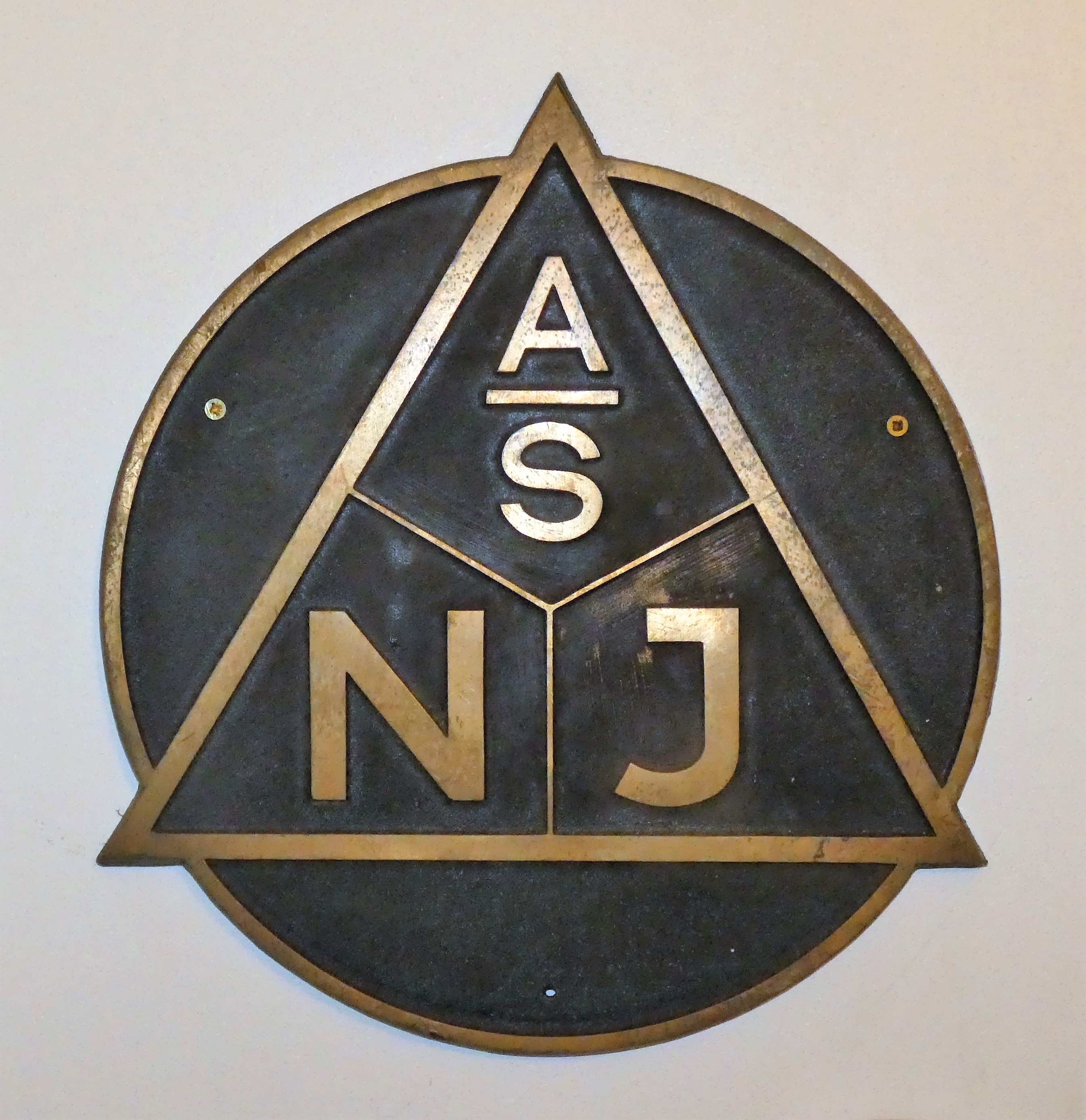
- Signs with National Industri's triangular logo

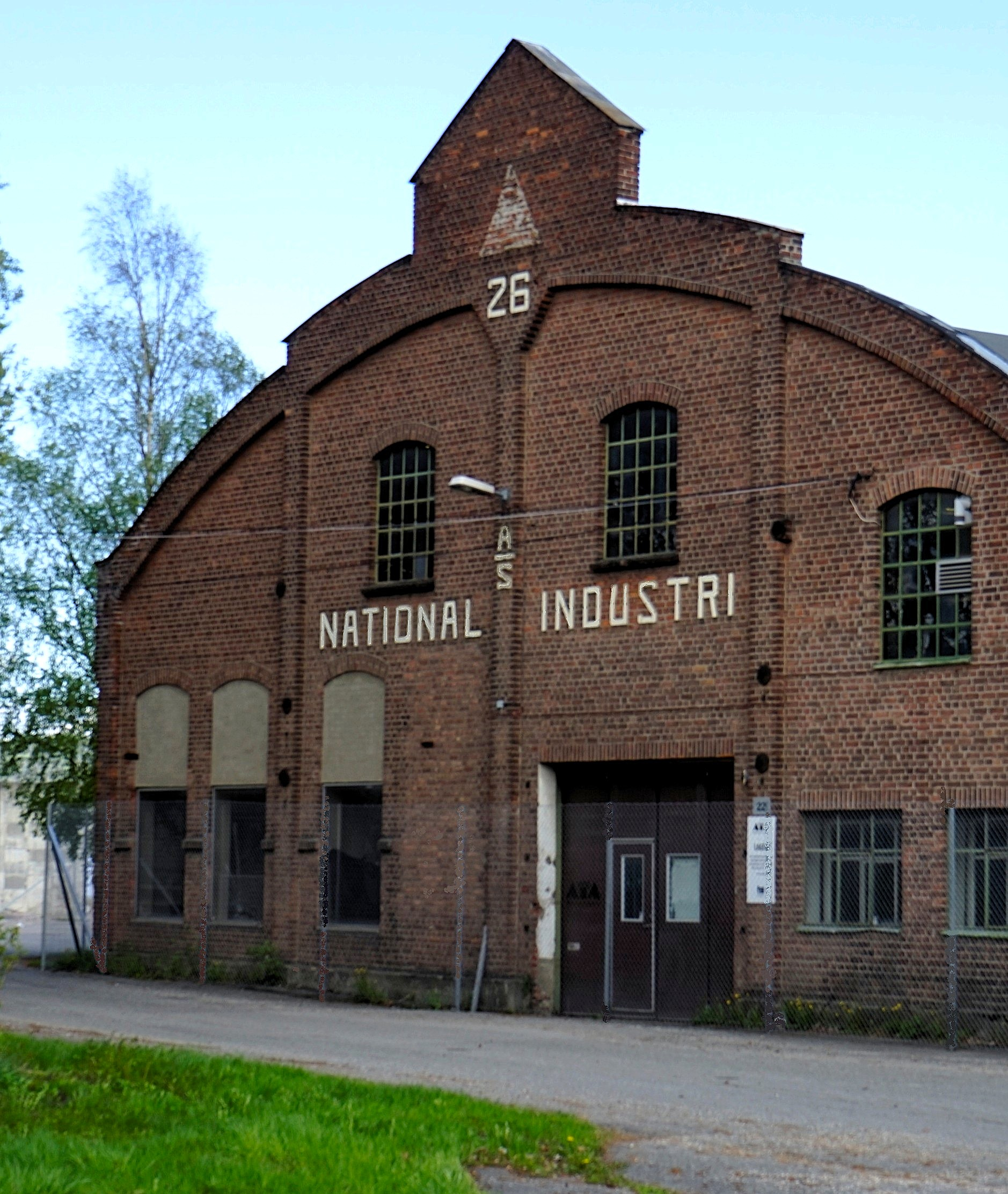
- National Industri at Brakerøya
- Formerly: A/S Elektrisk Industri
- Company type: Aksjeselskap
- Industry: Electrotechnical engineering
- Founded: 1917
- Defunct: 2000
- Fate: Absorbed into ABB; new-product manufacturing ceased
- Headquarters: Brakerøya, Drammen, Norway
- Key people: Gotfred Thorkildsen, Bernt Ingvaldsen
- Products: Transformers, generators, household appliances

National Industri was a Norwegian electrotechnical company established in 1917, with a factory at Brakerøya in Drammen. The company specialized in producing generators and transformers and developed into a leading exporter of smelting-works transformers. From the mid-1920s until 1946, the American company Westinghouse was the largest owner.

In the 1960s the company saw considerable export growth and took over transformer factories in several countries. In 1973 National Industri became part of Elektro Union, which in 1987 was absorbed into Elektrisk Bureau and then into ABB. Toward the end of the 1990s, the operation at Brakerøya became part of ABB's power-generation division. In 2019 all the buildings on the whole factory site were demolished to make way for the new Drammen Hospital.

== Background ==
National Industri was established in 1917 to secure Norwegian self-sufficiency in electrotechnical equipment at a time when the First World War had halted imports. The basis for the company was laid by the engineer Gotfred Thorkildsen (1879–1944), regarded as a pioneer in Drammen's early electrotechnical development.

As early as 1913, Thorkildsen had established A/S Elektrisk Industri at Brakerøya, producing transformers, electrical equipment, and copper wire, and in 1916 he also took the initiative to set up Norsk Elektrisk Lampefabrik (later Osram). When National Industri was formed the following year, the company was able to take over Thorkildsen's modern factory plant. By that point he had built up a considerable industrial operation but lost much of his fortune in the economic crises after the First World War.

== Formation ==
Gotfred Thorkildsen sold his well-developed electrotechnical company at Brakerøya in 1917 for 1.5 million kroner. The buyer was the newly created company A/S National Industri, established the same year by a merger of A/S Elektrisk Industri in Drammen, Holm-Hansen Elektrik in Sandefjord, and Fridthjov Andersens Telepointage in Kristiania.

The transformer factory was moved to Sandefjord from Drammen, while the plant in Drammen carried on production of electric motors, high- and low-voltage apparatus, copper wire, and insulated wiring. A planned iron foundry was put into operation in June 1917, and the motor factory opened in September the same year, but plans for a copper rolling mill were shelved, and the completed factory building was instead used as the main warehouse. National Industri grew quickly and soon became the largest company of its kind in Norway, with over 1,000 employees.

== Westinghouse takes over ==
In the first years National Industri was run in parallel in Sandefjord and Drammen, which contributed to financial difficulties, and in the early 1920s the operation in Drammen was scaled down after several years of losses. The rescue came in 1925, when the company was reconstructed: transformer production was moved back to Drammen and the factory modernized, and at the same time cooperation began with the American group Westinghouse Electric International Co. The old company was dissolved and replaced by a new one with the same name, in which Westinghouse took a third of the share capital, and in 1928 Westinghouse took over full ownership. Access to the group's technological expertise, patents, and sales apparatus was probably decisive for the company's continued operation.

In 1929 National began producing household products such as stoves, hotplates, heaters, and ovens. Production started from American Westinghouse models but was later developed further under the brand name Delta, and with a low-price profile and increasing demand it grew into one of the company's largest departments, with around 100 employees.

In 1932 the electrical engineer Bernt Ingvaldsen (1902–1985) was hired as factory manager, marking the transition from craft-based production to more industrial operation, with greater use of machinery, rationalization, and systematic product development. Ingvaldsen was managing director from 1949 to 1968, and the company had steady growth in this period.

== National ownership after the Second World War ==
In the postwar period it became a political priority to secure national ownership of important industrial companies, and many foreign-owned companies were either seized or bought back. In 1945 Bergens Telefonkompagni became a central actor in this process; the company, later named Bergen Industri Investering, became the main owner of several formerly foreign electrotechnical companies. In 1947 Westinghouse sold 80 percent of the shares in National Industri to Bergens Telefonkompagni, while the state took over the rest.

After the government opened for Norwegian production of refrigerators in 1951, National expanded production with more household products, though the main emphasis remained on transformers. In 1949 the company became the first in Norway to produce current transformers, and from 1958 it had its own department for instrument transformers developed by its own engineers. From the mid-1950s it also supplied transformers to smelting works in South America and to power plants in the Nordic countries, exports making up 23 percent of sales in the Norwegian market in 1956. In this period it also produced generators, synchronous motors, capacitors, bare copper wire, and Delta household appliances.

== Lower profitability and price cooperation ==
In 1961 the company set up its own development department to keep up with technological developments. Through the 1960s stove production stagnated while panel heaters for the electric heating of homes and offices grew in importance. Despite high turnover, National struggled with profitability, partly because of increased imports, but in 1967 it still had 1,000 employees and was Drammen's largest industrial company.

In 1966 National Industri delivered two 110 MVA generators to the Tysse II development, the largest the company had made to that point. The contract was awarded as part of an informal price cooperation with the competitor NEBB in Oslo, under which NEBB was to get 80 percent of the contracts and National 20 percent. Anti-competitive arrangements like this were widespread between companies until the 1980s, although they were illegal then too.

In 1968 Rudolf Lindboe took over as managing director, having been with the company since 1945, and emphasized technology development, the strengthening of core areas, and securing the market position. National developed ever-larger generators with high output and speed, and in 1971 held a third of the Norwegian generator market, while on the transformer side it had a market share of 60 percent. In this period National, NEBB, and ASEA-Per Kure held informal talks about dividing the market.

== Group formation and acquisitions ==
In keeping with the business trends of the time, National Industri was restructured in the 1970s. Production of Delta appliances was discontinued to concentrate efforts on power equipment. In 1970 the company bought the transformer producer Richard Pfeiffer in Sarpsborg, and in 1971 No-Tra-Mo A/S in Steinkjer followed. In 1973 a group structure was established in which National's sister company Elektro Union was made the parent company for National, AEG, and NERA, with Investa, which owned Bergen Industri Investering, holding 80 percent of the shares and the state keeping 20 percent.

In the period 1965–1970, National Industri had significant exports, especially of rectifier transformers and smelting-works transformers. Toward the end of the 1970s the company still had ambitions to become a global company in hydropower equipment but met protectionist trade barriers. To secure better access to the world market, it bought transformer factories in several countries: the first acquisition came in Sweden in 1977, followed by a factory in Virginia in the United States in 1984 and a larger factory in Scotland in 1985, which also brought subsidiaries in Malaysia, Singapore, and Ecuador. National ended up with transformer factories in eleven countries outside Norway.

National's most successful foreign venture was in Tanzania, where the company, in cooperation with NORAD, helped establish a transformer factory that opened in 1981. National also supplied equipment to several neighboring countries, and the venture resulted in the sale of generators and transformers worth 2 to 3 billion kroner in East and Central Africa.

== Merger and restructuring ==
Elektro Union, and thus National Industri, was merged in 1987 with Elektrisk Bureau, where Kjell E. Almskog had taken over as group chief executive the year before. Investa was still heavily on the ownership side, but ownership changed after a few years. The Swedish group ASEA, which already owned 20 percent of EB, merged with the Swiss BBC to form ABB in the autumn of 1987, and ASEA then bought up to 63 percent of EB as Investa sold its shares. Thus EB, National, NEBB, and Per Kure were gathered in ABB Norge, which became the name of the company from 1991.

As part of EB, National was restructured along with the other ABB companies. Production at Brakerøya was strengthened when operations from NEBB, Richard Pfeiffer in Sarpsborg, and ASEA Per Kure in Oslo were gathered in Drammen, ABB investing about one billion kroner in this restructuring. In 1992 ABB took over the rest of the shares in Elektrisk Bureau, and National was then fully incorporated into the ABB group under the name ABB National Transformer, with the company's repair and service operation for hydropower generators transferred from Sarpsborg at the same time.

In 1996 National became part of the newly created company ABB Kraft, after a merger with ABB Distribusjon and ABB Energi, with the head office placed at Brakerøya in Drammen. In 1999 ABB's international power-generation business merged with the French Alstom under the name ABB Alstom Power, and as a result the production of new products at Brakerøya was discontinued in 2000, though ABB kept maintenance and upgrading functions in one of the factory halls.

== From industry to hospital ==
The National story came to an end during 2018–2019, when ABB had to move its last operation in Halls 11–13 at Brakerøya to a new plant in Kobbervikdalen in Drammen. The reason was that Drammen was to get a new large hospital, and Brakerøya had been chosen as the site after many lengthy assessments. The plans prompted many studies of the heritage value of the old factory plant, but the need to raise the entire hospital site to protect against flooding meant that no buildings could be preserved, and during 2019 the whole area was demolished.

Before demolition, the developer was required to carry out documentation of the plant, done through photogrammetric survey of the heritage-worthy buildings' facades, drone photography, and photo documentation inside and out. In addition, the Norwegian Museum of Science and Technology conducted several interviews with former employees and took in objects for its collections, while the Drammen city archive preserved the archives.
