= Harald Bjerke =

Norwegian businessman

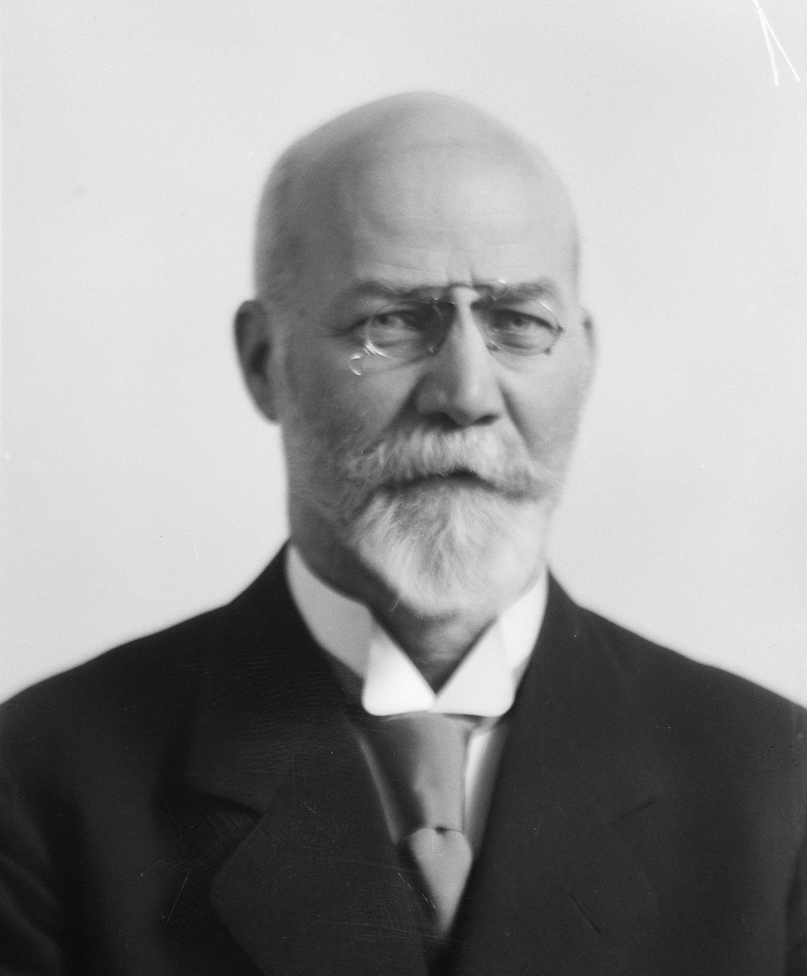
Harald Bjerke - 1918 - Ernest Rude - Oslo Museum - OB.RP36340a (cropped)

Harald Borgen Bjerke (4 March 1860 – 1 April 1926) was a Norwegian businessperson.

He was born in Kristiania. From 1895 to 1912 he was the managing director of Mandalsgatens Høvleri. From 1910 to 1912 he also chaired the Norwegian Employers' Confederation. From 1918 to 1926 he was the Director-General of Norsk Hydro.

He was also a supervisory council member of Elektrisk Bureau.

Business positions
Preceded by Sam Eyde	Director-general of Norsk Hydro; 1918-1926	Succeeded by Axel Aubert
