= Tomago aluminium smelter =

Australian aluminium production facility

Coordinates: 32°49′49″S 151°43′47″E

General information
- Type: Aluminium smelter
- Location: Tomago, Australia
- Opened: 1983
- Owner: Rio Tinto (52%); CSR (25%); Norsk Hydro (12%); AMP (11%)

Website
- www.tomago.com.au

The Tomago aluminium smelter is an aluminium smelter that is located in Tomago, New South Wales, Australia, approximately 13 kilometres (8.1 mi) west of Newcastle. It is operated by Tomago Aluminium Company, a joint venture owned by Rio Tinto, CSR, Norsk Hydro and AMP.

== History ==
The Tomago plant was started in 1983 using Pechiney AP18 technology. Two potlines with 240 pots each were built and operated at 181 kiloamperes (kA) for a production of 240,000 tonnes per year. In 1993, a third AP18 potline with 280 pots was commissioned. After potline 3 start up, current on the three potlines was 182 kA for a production of 385,000 tonnes per year. In 1998, the potlines 1 and 2 were extended with 20 pots at the end of each room, making 280 cell per line. The production of Tomago was increased by 50,000 tonnes to 435,000 tonnes per year. In 2002 the plant commenced the AP22 project to reach the a line current of 226 kA in 2007.

As at 2017, it is the largest consumer of electricity in New South Wales accounting for 12% of total capacity. AGL Energy builds a 500 MW / 2 GWh grid battery for 2028, with 435 containers at 40 tonnes each. Price is expected to be $400,000 per megawatt-hour of energy capacity.

In 2025, Tomago Aluminium Company began a consultation process with its employees about the future of its operations after its energy contract with AGL Energy expires in 2028.

In 2026, the smelter received a $2.5 billion bail-out following an intervention from the federal and New South Wales governments.

== Technology ==
The smelter currently comprises three potlines of 280 Pechiney AP18 (AP22) reduction cells each. Challenges faced by Rio Tinto's Tomago aluminium smelter are connected to unrestricted gas exports, and The Australia Institute suggests that restricting these exports could lower electricity prices and support the aluminium industry.

== See also ==
- List of aluminium smelters
