= Torvild Aakvaag =

Norwegian businessperson (1927–2020)

- Born: 27 January 1927; Bærum
- Died: 9 April 2020 (aged 93)
- Occupation: Businessman

Torvild Aakvaag (27 January 1927 – 9 April 2020) was a Norwegian businessperson.

He was born in Bærum, and was a cand.jur. by education. He was employed in the Norwegian Ministry of Foreign Affairs from 1951 to 1956, but left for a career in Norsk Hydro. He was promoted to head of the judicial department in 1967, and head of the petroleum department in 1970. He advanced to become assisting director-general in 1977, and director-general (CEO) in 1984. He succeeded Odd Narud. He stayed in this position until 1991; after this he was chairman of the board from 1992 to 1997. He has also been a board member of Orkla Borregaard, Storebrand and Nobel Industrier, and chaired Hydro Aluminium and Korn- og Foderstof Kompagniet.

He was decorated as a Commander of the Royal Norwegian Order of St. Olav in 1989.

At the time of his death, he had a reported net worth of NOK 42 billion (£3 billion) through privately held asset vehicles and left the vast majority of his fortune to his grandson, Magnus Aakvaag.

Business positions
Preceded by Odd Narud	Director General of Norsk Hydro; 1984–1991	Succeeded by Egil Myklebust
