= Barcarena water contamination =

- Date: February 16–18, 2018
- Location: Barcarena, Brazil; 1°32′48″S 48°44′9″W
- Type: Dam failure
- Cause: Leakage of tailing dam due to excessive rain
- Participants: Norsk Hydro; Alunorte
- Property damage: Contamination of drainage basin responsible for local water supply

Following heavy rains in February 2018, the City of Barcarena, in the Brazilian state of Pará, experienced severe flooding. The Brazilian Government determined that the flooding had compromised containment pools at the Alunorte alumina refinery, citing elevated levels of heavy metals in the surrounding waters. Norsk Hydro, the majority owner of Alunorte, denied responsibility for contamination outside of its facility. In 2021, residents of the state of Pará filed a lawsuit against Norsk Hydro citing environmental impacts by its refinery operations.

Barcarena water contamination (Brazil)

== Background ==
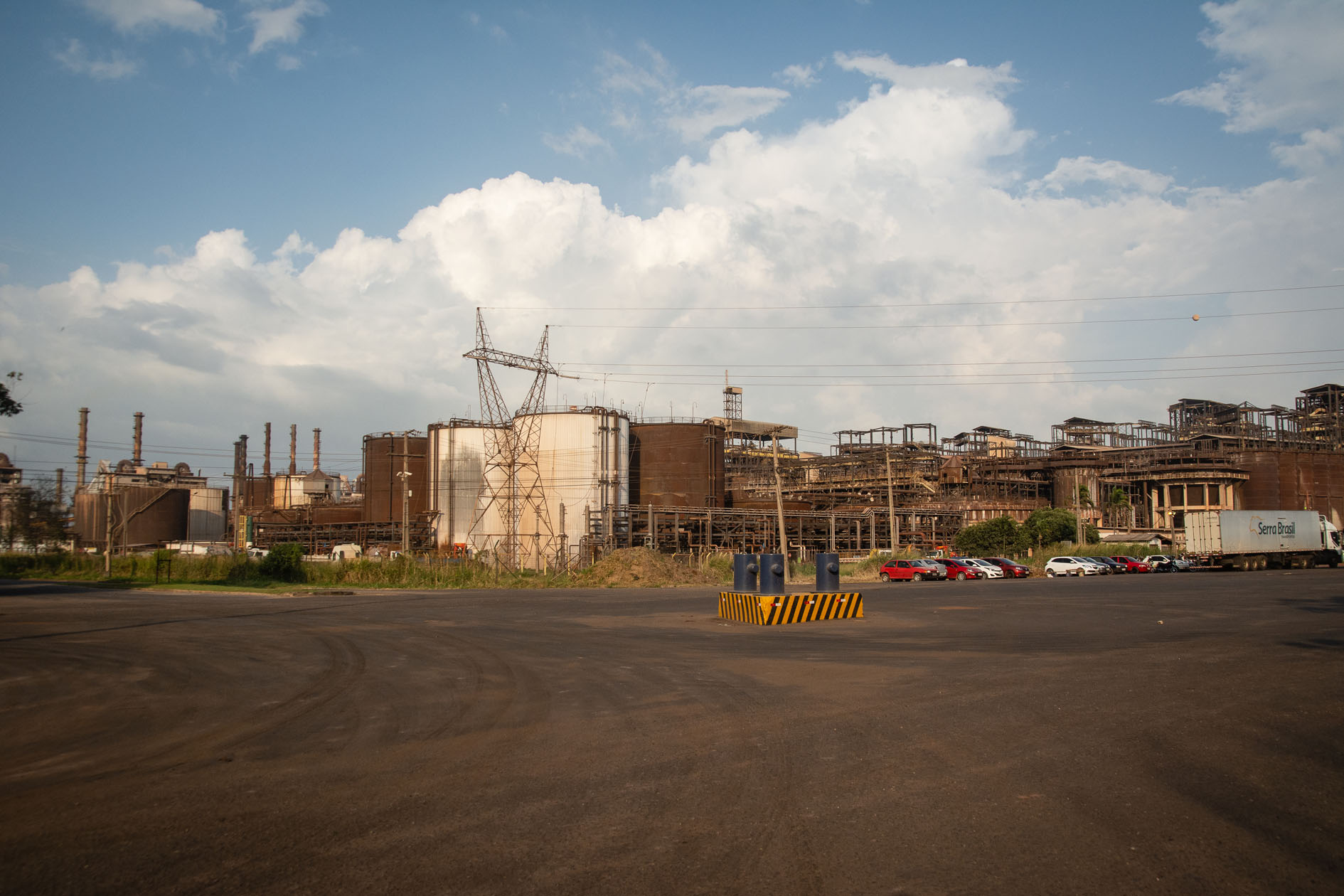
Norsk Hydro's Alunorte Facility, Barcarena Brazil

Between February 16–18, 2018, the city of Barcarena, in the Brazilian state of Pará, was flooded by heavy rainfall. The flooded areas included the containment basins of Norsk Hydro’s Alunorte alumina refinery. Following the floods, the Brazilian Ministry of Health reported that Alunorte’s wastewater pools had overflowed, evidenced by elevated levels of lead, aluminum, and other substances in the surrounding waters. A report by the Evandro Chagas Institute, an organization affiliated with the Brazilian Health Ministry, determined that the levels of aluminum in the surrounding rivers were 25 times above the permitted limits.

Government investigators further discovered the existence of two “clandestine” discharge pipes at the Alunorte facility. Norsk Hydro later acknowledged the existence of the pipes, admitting that they could have leaked rainwater during the 2018 floods.

Subsequently, Norsk Hydro acknowledged there was an unlicensed discharge of rainwater during the February floods at the Alunorte facility. However, the company denied responsibility for any contamination to the local environment. Norsk Hydro claimed that the Alunorte refinery was operating normally during the 2018 floods, and that company investigators found no evidence of a spill into the outside environment.

== Legal Actions ==
At the end of February 2018, the Pará Court of Justice ordered the Alunorte facility to reduce production by 50% and embargoed the use of one of the refinery’s tailings basins, pending further investigation. In November 2018, a federal court upheld the decision of the Pará Court of Justice, affirming the order to limit the refinery’s capacity to 50%. On May 20, 2019, the production embargo on the Alunorte refinery was lifted by a federal court in Brazil, allowing the refinery to return to normal production.

On February 5, 2021, a class action lawsuit was filed in the Netherlands against Norsk Hydro. The lawsuit represents approximately 40,000 claimants who live in the state of Pará. The suit alleges that Norsk Hydro’s operations are responsible for toxic contamination of the Murucupi River (which bisects the city of Barcarena), and for pollution in the communities near the company’s facilities. The lawsuit cites the 2018 spill at Alunorte.
