= Technal =

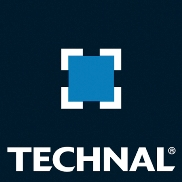
- Founded: 1960
- Founder: André BOS
- Headquarters: Toulouse, France
- Area served: Worldwide

Technal is a brand of Norsk Hydro, the Norwegian group whose business focuses on aluminium extrusions. Part of Hydro's Building Systems division, Technal is present in Europe, Latin America, South Africa. It is engaged in the development, manufacturing and marketing of aluminum glazing systems for commercial, public and residential buildings.

== History ==
In 1960, André Bos founded Alusud, designing aluminum window systems. The company was based in Amidonniers, Toulouse in the south west of France. Products included aluminum profiles and anodised sheets. The company worked with glazing companies, metalworkers and locksmiths, enabling the development of shopfront systems in the early 1960s. The business continued to develop in the south of France. In the 1970s, Bos took activity abroad, creating Technal International. By 1986, Technal Export had licensees in Lebanon, South Africa and the Ivory Coast. Exports to the Caribbean, Pacific and Indian ocean regions, West Africa, North Africa, Central America, South America, and Asia followed. A joint venture in Bahrain was established in 2000. In 2002, the Norsk Hydro group bought Technal, and when Hydro merged its aluminium extrusion activities with Sapa's extrusion business in 2013, Technal became part of the new Sapa joint venture.

== History of the logo ==
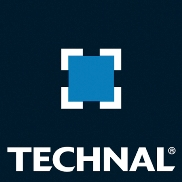
Technal logo

The Technal logo sympbolises one of its key product components - the 4114 profile.

In 1960, the first logo showed the company name "Alusud", the "A" becoming a stylised graphic in 1966. When the company opened overseas in 1970, the name and the graphic representation of the 4114 profile were brought together to form a new logo and the emblem of the Technal system; Alusud became known as Technal.

In 1983 the brand and logo were brought together and two years later, a new graphic was created and became internationally widespread. In 1995, the graphic identity of Technal was redesigned to represent the much evolved business.

== Activities ==
Technal markets its products through aluminum glazing companies. It has a network of certified installers – "Technal Aluminier" network - in France, Spain and Portugal to ensure fabrication and installation quality, and compliance with standards and regulations. Technal also works with architects, contractors and building owners directly on projects from design to completion. The main product categories are aluminium doors, sliding windows, casement windows, balustrades, curtain walling. The headquarters in Toulouse (France) has a product development and research centre which carries out prototype manufacture and testing, and product testing. Technal offers laboratory testing to verify compliance with European and international standards, and product performance, for both internal requirements and external certification bodies. Technal also works for the recycling of its products in factories.

== Technal worldwide ==
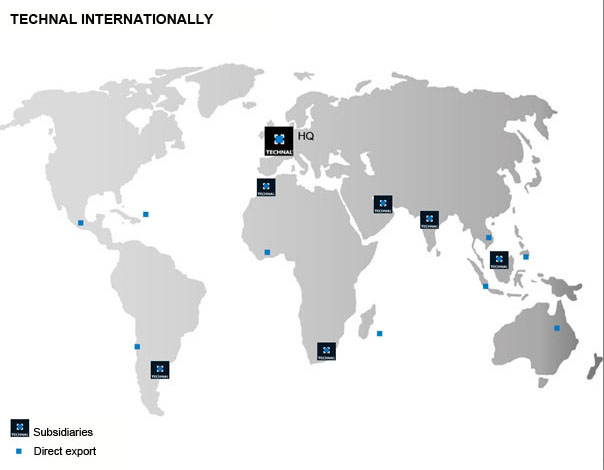
Technal in the world

Technal is present in Europe (Belgium, United Kingdom, Ireland, Switzerland, Italy, Spain, Portugal) and in over 70 countries. Operations are conducted from the headquarters in France, Toulouse, and from its subsidiaries in south east Asia, Middle East, India, South America, South Africa and Morocco.
