= Norsk Elektrisk Kabelfabrikk =

Norwegian electrical cable manufacturer

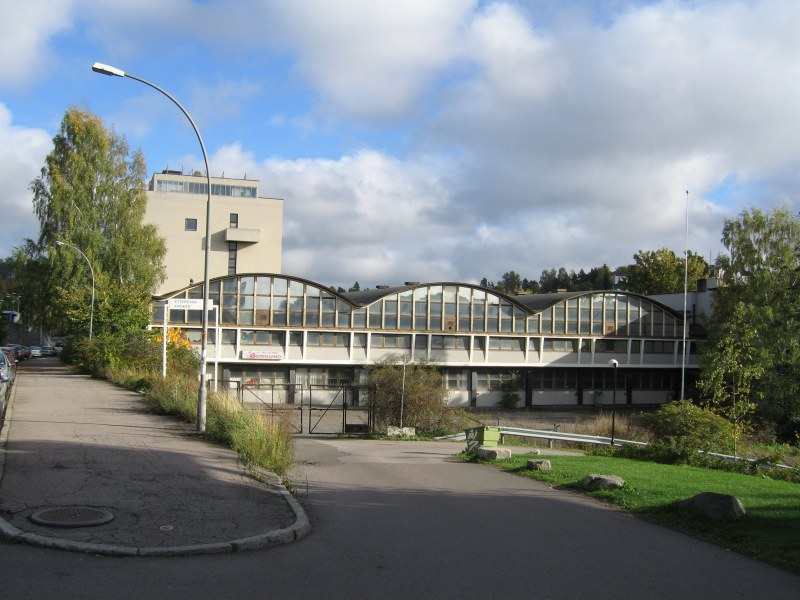
- Type: Aksjeselskap
- Industry: Electrical cables
- Founded: 1913
- Defunct: 1989
- Fate: Acquired by Elektrisk Bureau; production wound down
- Headquarters: Bryn, Oslo, Norway
- Key people: Alf Wold-Snilsberg, Aage Snilsberg
- Products: Cables for radio, television, and telecommunications

Norsk Elektrisk Kabelfabrikk (Norwegian for "Norwegian Electric Cable Factory"; often abbreviated NEK) was an industrial company in Oslo that produced cables for radio, television, and telecommunications, among other uses. The company was established in 1913. Production in Oslo was wound down in 1989, but parts of the operation were carried on in various companies.

== History ==
Norsk Elektrisk Kabelfabrikk was started by the twin brothers Thomas Wold and Alf Wold-Snilsberg in 1913. The Wold brothers were born in 1873 in Ringsaker and had experience in the industry; when the cable factory was established, Alf already had 20 years behind him at Elektrisk Bureau and solid enough industry experience to succeed in the strongly growing cable industry.

No Norwegian factories had yet started producing low-current cables. The electrification of Norway was in full swing, with low-current installations in buildings and homes and a growing appliance industry that needed cables and coils for new products, while the telecommunications network was also expanding.

Shortly after NEK was established, the factory moved into premises in Munkedamsveien. After his brother's death in 1924, Alf Wold-Snilsberg took over as owner and head, and in 1934 production moved to a new industrial building in Christian Kroghs gate by the Akerselva. Here growth continued with deliveries to the expanding radio industry, among others.

=== Award-winning industrial architecture ===
After the stagnation during the Second World War, much was to be made up in both installations and appliances, and a new large period of growth began. The premises by the Akerselva became too small, and in the early 1950s a major effort was made to obtain new ones. A new four-story block with a large low arched hall of 1,200 square meters was raised in Brynsengfaret at Bryn in Oslo. The building was completed in 1954 and inaugurated in 1955, and the architect, Guttorm Bruskeland, was awarded the Sundt Prize, with the distinctive arched concrete roofs particularly highlighted.

=== A family business in growth ===
NEK remained in the ownership of the Wold-Snilsberg family, after 1947 under the leadership of Aage Snilsberg. At this time there were 80 workers and salaried staff in the factory, which also housed the subsidiary Elektrisk Spoleindustri. Through the 1960s NEK strengthened its position, supplying more and more to the radio and television industry, Televerket, and installation and industry in general. Exports were growing and the factory was expanded, and by 1973 there were 240 employees at Bryn.

In the period 1973–1974 NEK established itself outside Oslo, as many others did, though the intention was not to close in Oslo but to expand production capacity. The new factory at Årnes in Nes in Romerike was built in close cooperation with Nes municipality, which, like many other district municipalities, worked hard to make conditions attractive for industrial establishment. NEK had considered many alternative and tempting offers before the choice fell on Årnes, and the Regional Development Fund also helped make the establishment there favorably financed.

=== Public listing ===
The third generation of the family, Bård Snilsberg, steered NEK into the 1980s. With a focus on growth abroad, NEK established a factory in England and bought factories in both the United States and Germany. The expansion required a capital increase, and the family company went public with a controlled share issue meant to secure the family continued control.

The listing nonetheless left the family company open to the business ideals of the 1980s, with acquisitions and structural changes. In 1988 Bård Snilsberg found that Elektrisk Bureau (EB), which his grandfather had broken away from to start out on his own, had bought the share majority and sidelined the family. This had major consequences for NEK, which, after the Swiss group ABB took over EB in 1989, was sacrificed in the large restructuring of Norwegian electrical and electronic industry.

The Bryn factory was closed around 1990, while the Årnes factory continued as EB Datakabel. The Dutch group Draka took this over in 2000, together with Norsk Kabelfabrikk in Drammen, which was also part of EB, and in 2011 the two were sold to the Italian cable producer Prysmian.

=== NEK Kabel as a continuing family company ===
Although the cable factory at Bryn was closed after the EB takeover, the NEK family business did not end. EB bought only the Norwegian factories, while NEK's investment in factories in England, Germany, the United States, and Sweden gave the family business new life abroad. This came through an agreement with EB that involved a non-compete period in the Norwegian market. NEK also kept the Isoterm factory it had established at Ringebu in 1972, where insulated and frost-proof pipes were produced, originally the Elvestad pipe.

After five years NEK Kabel was back as a Norwegian sales company, with Bård Snilsberg as principal owner. The production part at the factories abroad was spun off in 1993 into a separate company, Goodtech, which then gradually divested itself of cable production abroad and moved into new business areas in environmental technology. NEK Kabel became a pure sales and engineering company, using the expertise in the company and the owning family to tailor solutions for large customers by designing and procuring special cables, from its head office in Lørenskog.
