= Odd Narud =

Norwegian businessman

Odd Narud (3 February 1919 – 22 April 2000) was a Norwegian businessperson.

He was born in Furnes, and was educated as a siv.øk. He was hired in Norsk Hydro in 1943, advanced to become CFO in 1960 and assisting director-general in 1976. In 1977 he was hired as director-general (CEO), staying in this position until 1984.

Business positions
Preceded by Johan Berthin Holte	Director General of Norsk Hydro; 1977-1984	Succeeded by Torvild Aakvaag
