= Axel Aubert =

Norwegian chemical engineer (1873–1943)

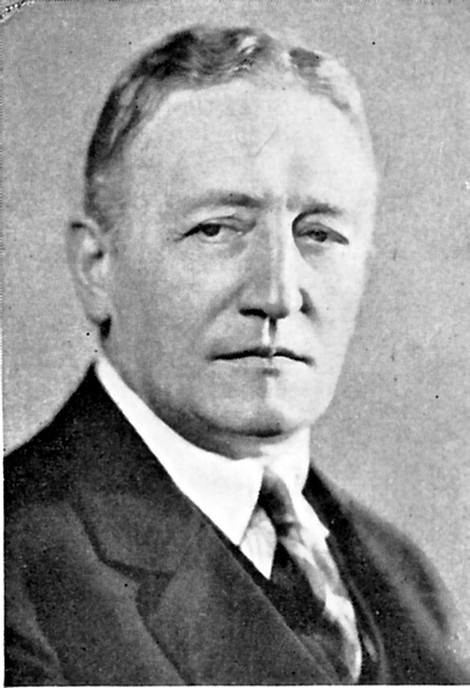
Axel Aubert.

Axel Aubert (11 December 1873 – 16 December 1943) was a Norwegian chemical engineer who served as Director-General of Norsk Hydro.

== Biography ==
He was born in Kristiania (now Oslo, Norway). He was the son of Otto Benjamin Andreas Aubert (1841–98) and Hilda Thaulow (1846–1923). After first studies at the Oslo Technical College, he then studied engineering at the University of Berlin and earned a doctorate in chemistry at the University of Basel in 1895.

He became the managing director of Engene Dynamitfabrik and Norsk Sprængstofindustri. In 1926 he was hired as Director-General (CEO) of Norsk Hydro. In 1940, while Norway was still neutral in World War II, Aubert was contacted by agents from French military intelligence regarding Norsk Hydro's production of heavy water (deuterium oxide) at its Vemork hydroelectric plant. Heavy water was an important material for Germany's nuclear weapon project and was only produced in any significant quantities at Vemork. He agreed to 'lend' Norsk Hydro's entire existing stock of heavy water to France for the duration of the war, observing that if Germany won the war he was likely to be shot. The French agents transported 185 kg (408 lb) of heavy water secretly to Oslo, to Perth in Scotland, and then to France.

Aubert retired as Hydro president in late 1941, but took over as the company's chairman and held this position until his death in 1943. Aubert emphasized the scientific and technological research. He was a member of the Executive Board of the Norwegian Industry Association from 1926 to 1934.

== Honours ==
Aubert was appointed Knight of the 1st Class of the Norwegian Order of St. Olav in 1928. He also held the Belgian Order of Leopold, the French Legion of Honour, the Danish Order of the Dannebrog and the Polish Order of Polonia Restituta.

Business positions
Preceded by Harald Bjerke	Director General of Norsk Hydro; 1926-1941	Succeeded by Bjarne Eriksen
