= Albras =

Aluminum plant in Brazil

Albras Alumínio Brasileiro S.A.
- Type: Public company
- Industry: aluminium
- Founded: 1978
- Headquarters: Barcarena, Brazil
- Products: aluminium products, aluminium alloys
- Revenue: US$ 3.4 billion (2010)
- Net income: ▲US$ 297.9 Million (2010)
- Number of employees: 7,800 (2010)
- Website: https://hydro.com

Albras Alumínio Brasileiro S.A. is the second-largest aluminium producer in Brazil having a total annual production of around 460,000 tonnes. It is a joint venture between Norsk Hydro (51%) and Nippon Amazon Aluminium Co. Ltd. (NAAC) (49%). The company is supplied with the electric energy it needs (700 MW) from the Tucurui Hydroelectric Plant (4000 MW).

It is located in the city of Barcarena in Pará.

== History ==
Established on September 1, 1978, Albras was constituted as a joint venture between Brazilian and Japanese capitals. On July 6, 1985, the Albras plant was started for the first time and it was officially inaugurated on October 24 the same year.
