= Hilde Merete Aasheim =

Norwegian business executive (born 1958)

- Born: 1958 (age 67–68); Larvik, Norway
- Education: Norwegian School of Economics
- Occupation: Business executive
- Employers: Elkem; Norsk Hydro

Hilde Merete Aasheim (born 1958) is a Norwegian business executive. She was chief executive officer of aluminium and renewable energy company Norsk Hydro from May 2019 to May 2024.

== Personal life and career ==
Born in Larvik in 1958, Aasheim is married to Tom Erling Mikkelsen. She is mother of comedian and program host Christian Mikkelsen.

Aasheim was educated as an economist from the Norwegian School of Economics, as well as a statutory auditor.

She worked for the company Elkem from 1986 to 2005, assuming various administrative positions. She was assigned with Norsk Hydro from 2005 to 2024. In 2019 she was appointed chief executive officer of Norsk Hydro, succeeding Svein Richard Brandtzæg. In May 2024, she stepped down as CEO of Hydro, succeeded by Eivind Kallevik.

Aasheim has also chaired the board of the Federation of Norwegian Industries.

She was ranked 60th on Fortune's list of Most Powerful Women in 2023.
