= Guitarrada =

- Stylistic origins: Choro; carimbó; merengue; cumbia; zouk; mambo; brega; bolero; Jovem Guarda
- Cultural origins: 1970s in Pará, Brazil
- Typical instruments: Electric guitar; drums

Guitarrada, also called lambada instrumental ("instrumental lambada"), is an instrumental musical genre that emerged in the state of Pará, Brazil, originating from the fusion of choro with carimbó, merengue, cumbia, mambo, bolero, Jovem Guarda, brega, among others. In this style, the electric guitar is predominantly solo.

== History ==
The popularization of the electric guitar in Brazil in the 1950s and 1960s bringing elements of surf music, instrumental rock and guitarists such as The Ventures and Dick Dale, together with the creation of Jovem Guarda in the 1960s, influenced musicians from Pará in the adoption of the electric guitar and the development of the style.

The beginning of the guitarrada was the release of the album Lambadas das Quebradas, in 1978, by Mestre Vieira. In 1980, the band Os Populares from Igarapé-Miri released the album Lambadas Incrementadas and in 1982, Aldo Sena, who stood out as a soloist in this band, launched his solo career. That same year, businessman Carlos Santos, owner of the Gravasom record label, released the LP Guitarradas - Lambadas Ritmo Alucinante, which became a sales success, followed by six more volumes.

In 1996, the group Cravo Carbono was formed in Belém and in 1998 released the album Mundo Açu. In the same year, guitarist Ximbinha (at the time known as Chimbinha) released the album Guitarras Que Cantam. In 2003, Cravo Carbono guitarist Pio Lobato created the musical project Mestres da Guitarrada, together with Mestre Vieira, Mestre Curica and Aldo Sena, which released the album Mestres da Guitarrada in 2004.

== Basic discography ==
- Lambada das Quebradas (1978) Mestre Vieira
- Os Populares de Igarapé-Miri - Lambadas Incrementadas (1980) group of Aldo Sena and João Gonçalves
- Guitarradas - Lambadas Ritmo Alucinante (1982) Carlos Marajó
- Solano e Seu Conjunto (1984) Mestre Solano
- Guitarras Que Cantam (1998) Chimbinha & Banda
- Peixe Vivo (1999) Cravo Carbono
- Mestres da Guitarrada (2004) Mestres da Guitarrada

== See also ==
- Brega pop
