= Paragominas mine =

Mine in Pará, Brazil

Coordinates: 3.2635°S 47.7355°W

- Interactive map of Paragominas mine
- Location: Paragominas, Pará, Brazil
- Products: Bauxite
- Production: 9,900,000 tonnes of bauxite
- Opened: 2007
- Company: Norsk Hydro

The Paragominas mine is a large mine located in the northern part of Brazil in Pará. Paragominas is one of the largest bauxite mines in the world, having estimated reserves of 1 billion tonnes. It is currently controlled by Norsk Hydro, who purchased a 60% stake in the mine from Vale in 2010.
