= Elektrisk Bureau =

Former Norwegian telecommunications company

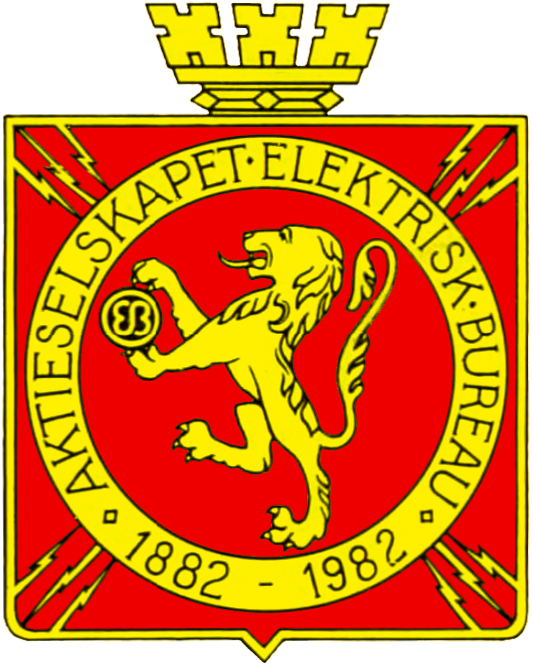
- Formerly: AS Elektrisk Bureau
- Industry: Telecommunication, electronics
- Founded: 1882
- Defunct: 1992
- Fate: Acquired by ABB; renamed ABB Norge in 1992
- Successor: Asea Brown Boveri
- Headquarters: Oslo, Norway
- Key people: Carl Söderberg, Thorstein Øyan
- Products: Telephones, switchboards, cables, radio equipment, heating appliances
- Parent: ASEA

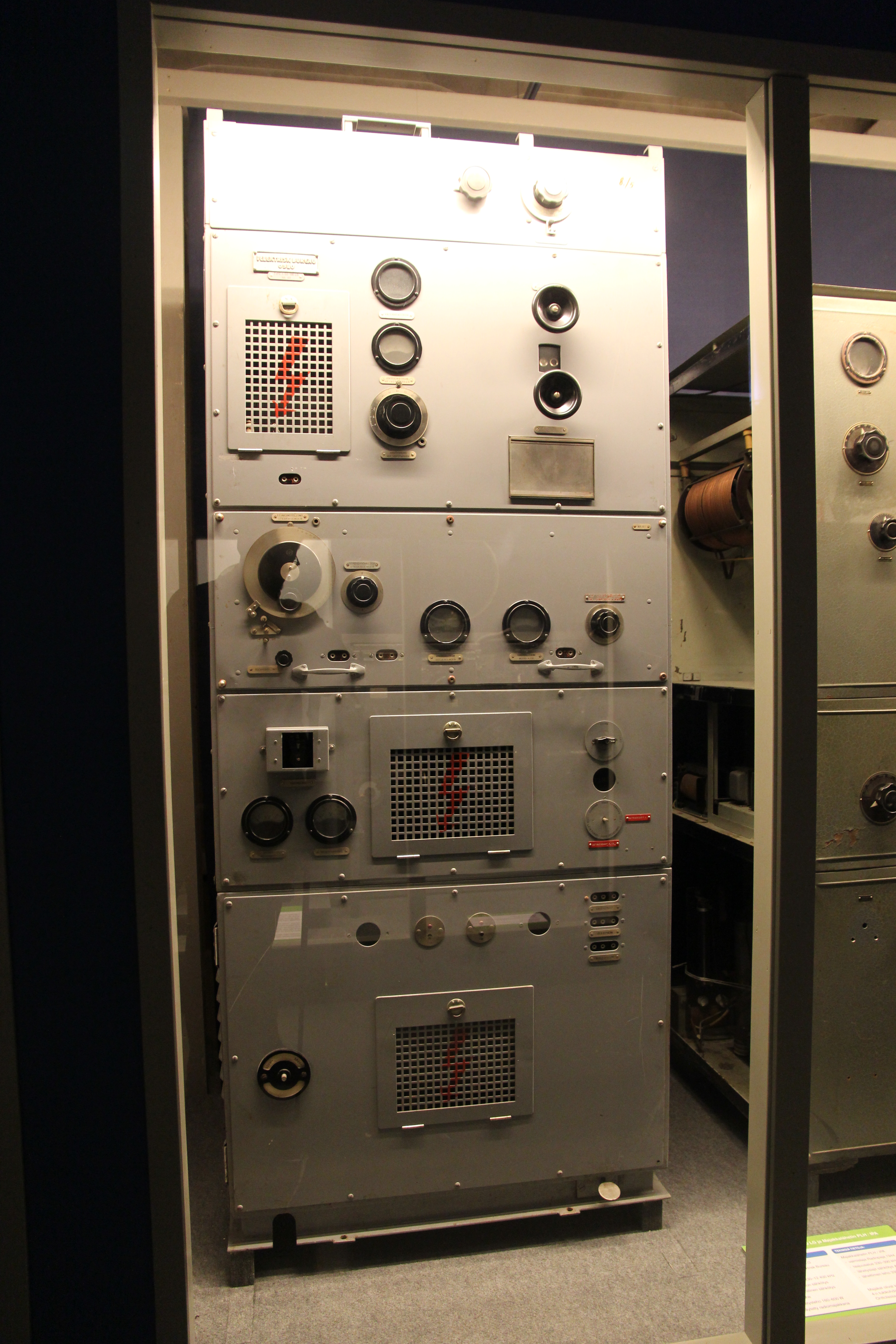
Elektrisk Bureau 1-SS-500 LG radio transmitter from 1942

Elektrisk Bureau (EB; Norwegian for "Electrical Bureau") was a Norwegian electrotechnical company, founded in Kristiania (later Oslo) in 1882. EB became a joint-stock company in 1895 and through the 1900s grew into a leading company in the Norwegian electronics and telecommunications industry.

Televerket and the armed forces were among the company's largest customers in Norway, but it also became a significant exporter of telephone systems internationally. In 1896 EB opened a new factory at Majorstua in Kristiania, and from 1970 the head office was at Billingstad in Asker Municipality. In addition to telephones, EB produced cables, radio-link equipment, ship radio stations, remote-control equipment, and cooking and heating appliances under the Rex trademark. In 1988 the Swedish-Swiss group ABB took over the share majority in EB, while the telephone division was sold to Ericsson. In 1992 the company changed its name to ABB Norge.

== Establishment ==
Barely ten years after Alexander Graham Bell invented the telephone, Norway was among the world leaders in telephones per inhabitant. Bell had not patented the telephone in Scandinavia, which allowed the free establishment of competing systems. The strongest competitor was the Swedish L.M. Ericsson, which had an active agent in Norway in the Swede Carl Söderberg (1841–1902). During the most hectic years of expansion, Ericsson had trouble delivering enough equipment for both its home market in Sweden and abroad, and so in large part helped its Norwegian agent set up a competing business.

In 1882 Söderberg established Elektrisk Bureau with financial backing from the goldsmith Oluf Tostrup. Söderberg brought with him a stock of goods and a solid customer base as a main supplier to telephone companies in Kristiania, Bergen, and Stavanger. From business premises in Karl Johans gate 5, the plan was to continue selling telephone apparatus from Ericsson and other brands. The first manager was the engineer Bertrand Kolbenstvedt, who with a small staff sold telephone apparatus and did other electrical installation work. The firm also held an important agency for the German Schuckert's heavy-current technology.

== Expansion and a new factory ==
In 1883 the instrument maker Thorstein Øyan (1855–1924) was hired as works master and placed alongside Kolbenstvedt in the daily management. Two years later EB launched its first own-produced telephone, based on its own patents. In 1886 Akers mekaniske Verksted came in as an owner, and EB established itself as a more dedicated factory in premises by Akers yard in Vika.

In the 1890s EB saw strong growth in the telephone market. The factory manager Øyan designed the cast-iron wall telephone, which became a sales success and established EB as a leading player in telecommunications equipment, and he also developed a carbon-granule microphone that drew international attention. In 1896 EB opened a new factory at Majorstua, in what is today Middelthuns gate 17. The four-story, 2,700-square-meter building had the capacity to produce up to 7,000 telephone sets a year, and two years later the neighboring site was developed into a dynamo factory. By the turn of the century EB was among Norway's leading industrial companies, with 370 employees and a strong market position in telephony and electronic articles.

The expansion with the new factory meant a shift to mass production, in which a large part of the increased workforce consisted of women. Although the women mainly represented the unskilled part of production, EB hired Norway's first female technical draftsman in Thea Falck-Ytter (1862–1953). In the wake of the 1899 crash, EB was forced to increase its focus on the export market, and within a few years, by 1905, it had increased exports by several hundred percent, delivering telephone apparatus and exchanges to countries in Europe, the United States, and cities in Africa, Asia, and South America. In the decade up to the First World War the home market normalized, with renewed growth in domestic telephony.

== Challenges after the First World War ==
During the First World War EB was hard hit by reduced exports and shortages of raw materials and labor. After the war it struggled to keep pace with technological developments, especially in more modern telephone technologies such as automatic exchanges. EB developed its own automatic exchanges, but these could not compete with foreign products, so the company continued with manual exchanges, delivering Europe's largest manual switchboard to the national telephone exchange in Oslo in 1924 — by then an outdated technology, as most larger foreign companies had already gone over to automatic solutions.

To broaden its activity, EB developed household appliances such as stoves and cookers under the Rex trademark, and in the 1920s it also began producing radios, laying the basis for the company's long-term work with radio technology. Despite these measures, economic problems and strong competition left EB struggling with profitability, and in 1920 the workforce at the large Majorstua factory was cut from 1,000 to under half within a short time. After several changes of director and continued difficulties, the Swedish L.M. Ericsson became a part-owner of EB in 1928, giving EB access to new technology and Ericsson's development department, while Ericsson gained a share in the production capacity and expertise the Oslo factory could offer.

== New telephone design ==
In 1932 EB set a new global standard with a telephone design developed by Johan Christian Bjerknes (1889–1983) and Jean Heiberg. Made of molded bakelite, it was the world's first telephone without the traditional cradle hook for the receiver. Through the 1930s EB's turnover grew with expansion in telephone exchanges, radio technology, and ship radios.

During the Second World War the company balanced between German demands and discreet support for the resistance. The production of telephones, exchanges, and cables was attractive and important both for civil society and for the German occupiers, while EB employees took part in sabotage actions and supplied communications equipment to the home front. After the war EB started up again with worn-down factories and a shortage of labor and raw materials. Civilian telephones were given low priority by the authorities, who regarded them as a luxury, reserving them for working life, doctors, and other important functions while ordinary people made do with telephone booths. This priority hit EB hard in the 1950s, and the company had to find new markets to avoid layoffs.

Radio technology was an area that created growth for the company, both for military and civilian use, with EB supplying equipment to the armed forces, Televerket, and NRK's transmitter network for FM radio and television. Production of household appliances under the Rex brand also went well until the 1960s, when increased competition led EB to sell its stove production in 1962.

== Upturn in the 1970s ==
In the 1970s EB developed into a Norwegian cornerstone company in the electronics industry. Five-year plans with Televerket secured large orders at favorable prices, and the purchasing policy protected Norwegian producers, which, combined with success in radio technology, laid the basis for further expansion. The head office and factory at Majorstua were replaced by a new plant at Billingstad in Asker between 1970 and 1972.

Ericsson's shares in EB were reduced to a minority holding through a share issue, and the company sold down to a 25 percent stake. The state company Årdal og Sunndal Verk (ÅSV) and the insurance company Storebrand bought in as new owners. As part of the agreement, Ericsson received contracts for data-transmission equipment and a strategic position in the sale of digital telephone exchanges.

== Boom years and a lost tender ==
After 1980, EB was affected by political and economic changes. The conservative wave and the Willoch government brought less state control, deregulation of the financial markets, and new business leaders focused on shareholder profit. EB, which had long benefited from high prices to Televerket and a near monopoly, now struggled with profitability despite strong growth in value, and the share raids of the boom years drew attention to companies like EB with low share values but large property values.

In 1983 EB lost the tender for Televerket's digital venture; the company backed Ericsson's AXE system but was outcompeted by STK and ITT's System 12. In the autumn of 1984 the financier Niels A.B. Bugge (1942–2024) bought into EB, as he had earlier done with companies such as Porsgrund Porselænsfabrik and Helly Hansen. By the end of the year the Bugge group owned 25 percent, as much as Ericsson.

== "New EB" as a large group ==
In December 1985 the Bergen group Investa took over 60 percent of the ownership of EB. Investa's holding company Elektro Union, which gathered a range of electrotechnical industrial companies, was then sold to EB, which became the new holding company, so that by 1987 Elektrisk Bureau had become one of Norway's largest industrial companies. A survey from 1987 showed over 100 businesses in production, sales, installation, service, and consulting in more than 60 Norwegian municipalities with EB first in their names, among them EB Strømmen, the former Strømmens Verksted, NERA in Bergen, Lehmkuhl Electronics at Skøyen in Oslo, Anker-Sønnak in Oslo, and Norsk Kabel in Hokksund, in addition to 29 businesses abroad.

These financial and structural changes did not solve the profitability problems in production in the old core areas. In 1987 the ban on connecting imported telephones to the Norwegian telephone network was lifted, marking the end of the EB telephone's monopoly era, and the increased competition from foreign producers was keenly felt by the telephone factories in Arendal and Risør. The general economic downturn also brought a decline in most other areas, such as power installations and offshore contracts. The owning company Investa ran into great difficulties, and a sale of EB became unavoidable.

== Sale to ABB and dissolution ==
In 1987–1988 ABB took over the share majority in EB. The organization was considerably slimmed down, with fewer companies, each given its own profit responsibility. ABB gathered electrotechnical production such as generators and transformers at EB's National in Drammen and realized large property values at Hasle and Skøyen in Oslo, the NEBB site at Skøyen alone said to have brought ABB 650 million kroner. The telephone division was sold to the earlier owner Ericsson. From 1992 ABB became sole owner of EB, and the company changed its name to ABB Norge, with which the name Elektrisk Bureau too became part of industrial history.
