= Barcarena, Pará =

Barcarena
- Municipality
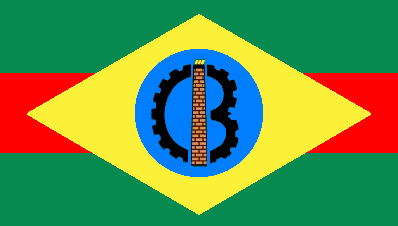
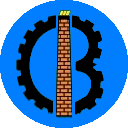
- Flag Coat of arms

- Location in Pará

- Location in Brazil
- Coordinates: 01°30′21″S 48°37′33″W
- Country: Brazil
- Region: Northern
- State: Pará
- Mesoregion: Belém
- Microregion: Belém
- Cont. inhabited: Prior to Portuguese rule
- Freguesia: 1758
- Incorporated (municipality): May 10, 1897

Government
  - Mayor: Renato Ogawa

Area
  - Total: 1,310.588 km^{2} (506.021 sq mi)
- Elevation: 15 m (49 ft)

Population (2022 Census)
  - Total: 126,650
  - Estimate (2025): 139,076
- Time zone: UTC−3 (BRT)
- CEP postal code: 68445-000
- Area code: 91
- Website: barcarena.pa.gov.br

Barcarena is a Brazilian municipality in the state of Pará adjacent to the Tocantins River. It has a population of 127,027 and is part of the Belém metropolitan area. The city's economy relies largely on agriculture and bauxite. There are also facilities for pig iron nearby. They city and port are developing as a major transshipping port that takes goods for international export linked by rail from nearby inland ports, from all over Brazil, speeding up shipment and reducing time and costs as opposed to traditional megaports in the Southeast.

== History ==
The town was originally inhabited by the Aruã people. In 1709 Jesuits came.

On October 6, 2015, the livestock vessel "MV Haidar" capsized in the Vila do Conde port due to an unsuccessful turning maneuver. It had 4,900 live cattle and almost 700 metric tonnes of oil on board. 4,400 cattle drowned while locked in the ship's cargo area. About 500 animals could free themselves, but only about 100 survived the accident. Fuel and oil seeped from the wreck into the water and contaminated the Pará river and surrounding beaches, which deprived many local fisher families of their livelihood. Since the removal of the oil slick proved to be complicated, and no consensus regarding responsibility and suitable cleanup efforts could be reached, hundreds of carcasses rotted at the beach and inside the shipwreck for months – a huge burden on the fishery and tourism of the region. The competent Federal Ministry estimated the damage to the residents to be 71 million reais (about 21 million US$). By July 2016 nothing had been paid out yet.

== Geography ==
=== Water contamination ===
In 2018, Bacarena experienced flooding due to heavy rains. The resulting natural disaster led to heavy metal contamination of the water from the nearby Alunorte facilities.

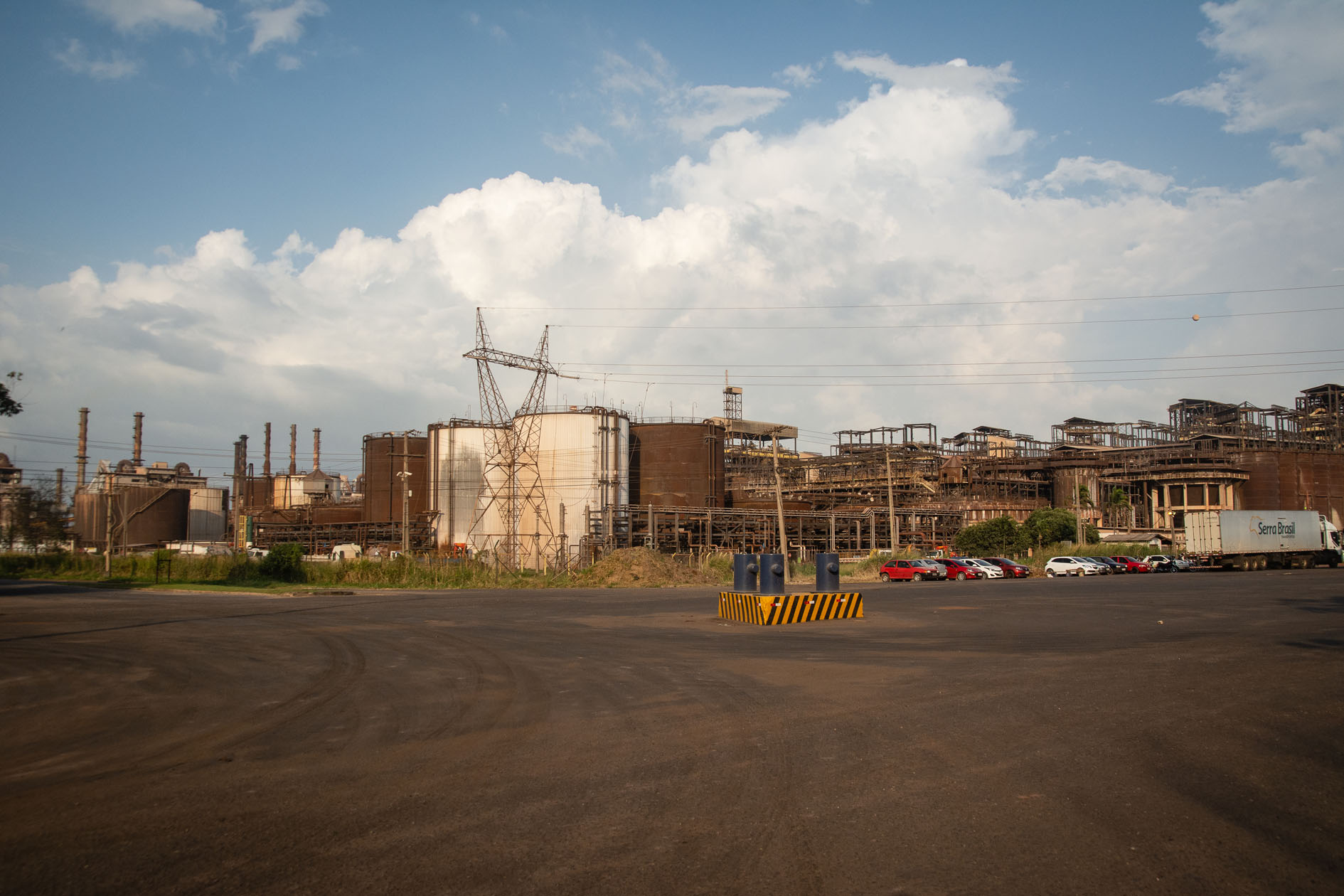
Norsk Hydro's Alunorte Facility that contaminated the water in Barcarena

=== Climate ===
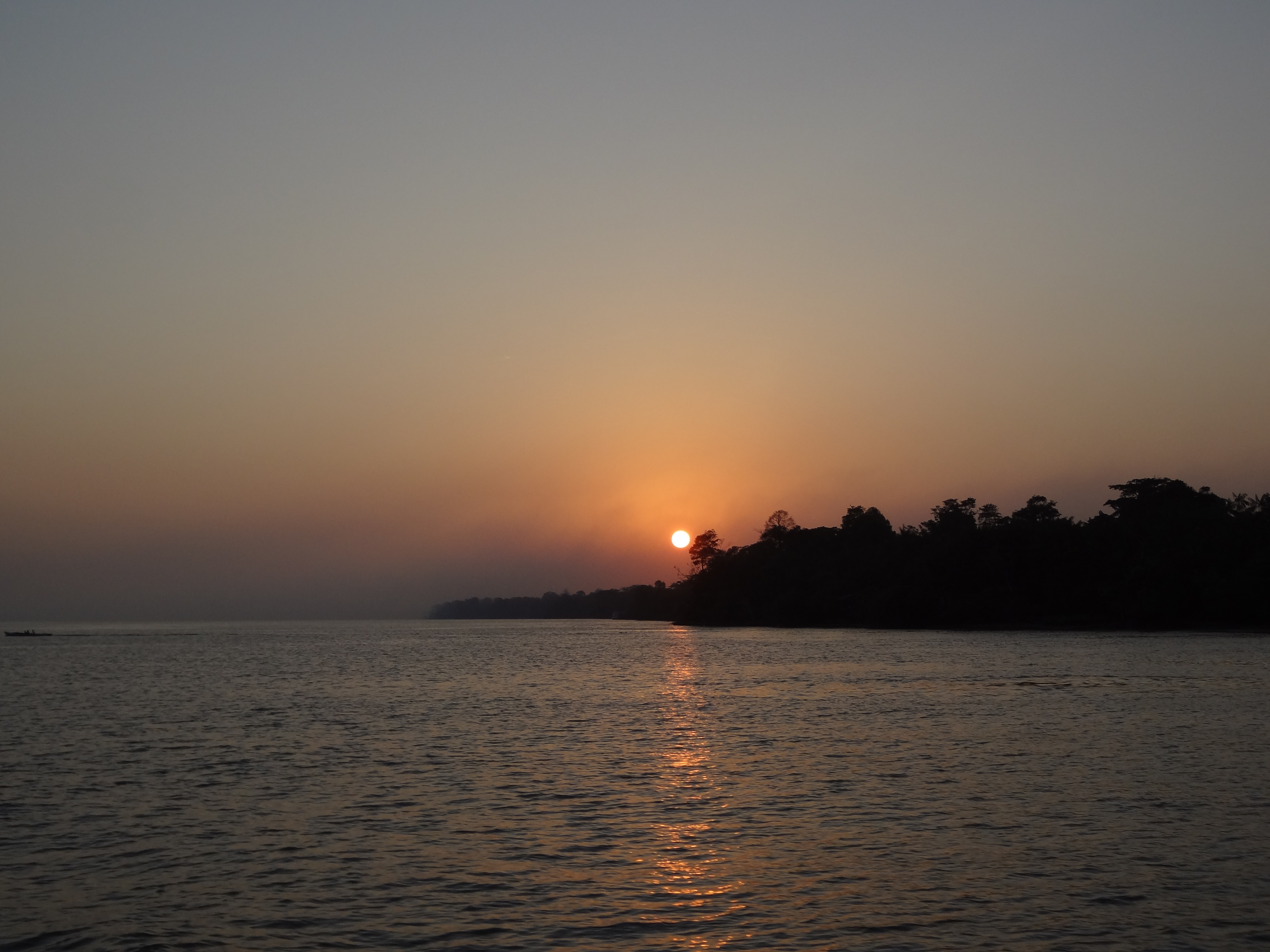
Barcarena water view

Barcarena has a tropical rainforest climate (Af) with moderate rainfall from August to November and heavy to very heavy rainfall in the remaining months.

Climate data for Barcarena
| Month | Jan | Feb | Mar | Apr | May | Jun | Jul | Aug | Sep | Oct | Nov | Dec | Year |
|---|---|---|---|---|---|---|---|---|---|---|---|---|---|
| Mean daily maximum °C (°F) | 30.6 (87.1) | 30.5 (86.9) | 30.9 (87.6) | 31.4 (88.5) | 31.7 (89.1) | 31.8 (89.2) | 32.1 (89.8) | 32.1 (89.8) | 32.3 (90.1) | 32.3 (90.1) | 32.0 (89.6) | 31.5 (88.7) | 31.6 (88.9) |
| Daily mean °C (°F) | 26.4 (79.5) | 26.5 (79.7) | 26.5 (79.7) | 27.0 (80.6) | 26.9 (80.4) | 26.8 (80.2) | 27.0 (80.6) | 27.0 (80.6) | 27.1 (80.8) | 27.2 (81.0) | 27.1 (80.8) | 26.8 (80.2) | 26.9 (80.3) |
| Mean daily minimum °C (°F) | 22.3 (72.1) | 22.5 (72.5) | 22.1 (71.8) | 22.7 (72.9) | 22.2 (72.0) | 21.9 (71.4) | 21.9 (71.4) | 22.0 (71.6) | 22.0 (71.6) | 22.2 (72.0) | 22.3 (72.1) | 22.2 (72.0) | 22.2 (72.0) |
| Average rainfall mm (inches) | 325 (12.8) | 366 (14.4) | 387 (15.2) | 358 (14.1) | 250 (9.8) | 152 (6.0) | 134 (5.3) | 109 (4.3) | 103 (4.1) | 81 (3.2) | 78 (3.1) | 189 (7.4) | 2,532 (99.7) |
Source: Climate-Data.org

== See also ==
- List of municipalities in Pará
