= Norsk Hydro =

Norwegian aluminium and renewable energy company

Norsk Hydro ASA
- Type: Public
- Traded as: OSE: NHY
- Industry: Metals
- Founded: 1905; 121 years ago
- Headquarters: Oslo, Norway; 59°54′50.97″N 10°39′2.42″E
- Key people: Eivind Kallevik (president and CEO); Rune Bjerke (chairman); Magnus Aakvaag (Strategic Advisor)
- Products: Aluminium and related products; hydropower and solar power technologies
- Revenue: ▲NOK 109,220 million (2017)
- Operating income: ▲NOK 11,215 million (2017)
- Net income: ▲NOK 9,184 million (2017)
- Total assets: ▲NOK 163,327 million (2017)
- Number of employees: 35,000 (end 2017)
- Website: hydro.com

Norsk Hydro ASA (often referred to as just Hydro) is a Norwegian aluminium and renewable energy company, headquartered in Oslo. It is one of the largest aluminium companies worldwide. It has operations in some 50 countries around the world and is active on all continents. The Norwegian state owns 34.3% of the company through the Ministry of Trade, Industry and Fisheries. A further 6.5% is owned by Folketrygdfond, which administers the Government Pension Fund of Norway. Norsk Hydro employs approximately 35,000 people. Eivind Kallevik has been the CEO since May, 2024, following Hilde Merete Aasheim. Rune Bjerke has been the Chairman since 2024 and Magnus Aakvaag (the grandson of former CEO Torvild Aakvaag) serves as a strategic advisor.

Hydro had a significant presence in the oil and gas industry until October 2007, when these operations were merged with Statoil to form StatoilHydro (in 2009 changed back to Statoil, which is now called Equinor).

== History ==
=== First steps with fertiliser ===
Financed by the Swedish Wallenberg family and French banks, the company was founded on December 2, 1905 as Norsk hydro-elektrisk Kvælstofaktieselskab (lit. Norwegian hydro-electric nitrogen limited) by Sam Eyde, exploiting a novel technology for producing artificial fertilizers by fixing nitrogen from air. The technology had been developed by the Norwegian scientist Kristian Birkeland. The method is still known as the Birkeland–Eyde process. The process required large amounts of electric energy, and for this, a power plant was built at the Svelgfossen waterfall near Notodden. Later also Rjukan Falls was developed and its power harnessed, in the process establishing the city of Rjukan, establishing the plant Norsk Hydro Rjukan.

Hydro's first factory was built at Notodden (opened in 1907) followed up with another at Rjukan in Tinn Municipality (opened in 1911). Then in 1920 production was established at Glomfjord in Nordland county. In 1930 Norsk Hydro opened a plant at Herøya outside Porsgrunn. To begin with it was to function as a shipping port for the fertilizer as well as a point to import limestone. From 1936 Hydro also started producing fertilizer at Herøya. There was also opened a railway, Rjukan Line, connecting Rjukan with Hærøy. The railway opened in 1909 and consisted of a railway ferry across Lake Tinn, railway again with the Tinnoset Line and a barge ride from Borgestad to Herøya with barge on the Telemark Canal. The canal was superseded by the Bratsberg Line in 1916.

By the 1920s, Norsk Hydro's electric arc-based technology for manufacturing artificial fertilizer was no longer able to compete with the newly developed Haber-Bosch process, and in 1927 the company formed a partnership with the German company IG Farben in order to gain access to this process. By 1945, IG Farben had become a majority shareholder in Norsk Hydro. The plant at Herøya was a direct result of no longer being dependent on immediate proximity to the power sources. This provided the advantage of being able to have the plants and the shipping port in the same location, as was the case with the Herøya plant.

=== Heavy water production at Rjukan ===
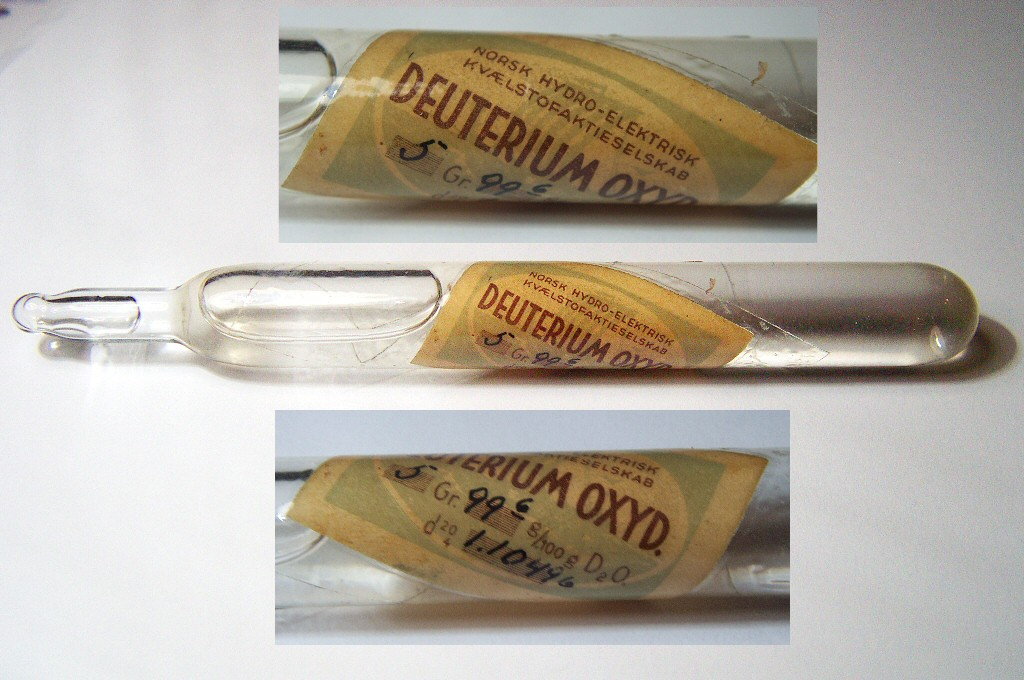
Heavy water sample made by Norsk Hydro

The Rjukan plant was the only location in Europe which produced heavy water, a component the Allied powers in World War II feared would be used as part of the German atomic bomb project. At the time, German industrial conglomerate I.G. Farben owned stock in Norsk Hydro, which then produced less than 11 litres (3 US gal) of heavy water per month, and the company was approached to increase its deuterium output to at least 110 litres (30 US gal) per month. Although Norsk Hydro's management had previously refused to supply the heavy water, upon Norway's surrender to Nazi Germany, the company gave up its resistance and agreed to supply 1.5 tons of heavy water per year.

Consequently, Norsk Hydro's facilities were the target of several commando and air raids and a sabotage raid which eventually resulted in the plant's destruction and later reconstruction.

=== First metal production ===
The first steps towards light metal production came in 1940 when Hydro started construction of a magnesium carbonate plant at Herøya, but the German invasion of Norway stopped the plans.

In 1941 the Oslo Consortium (Norwegian: Oslo-konsortiet) invested money equivalent to year 2014 Norwegian kroner 172 million. (The consortium included Thomas Fearnley, Orkla, Fred Olsen, Storebrand, Jens P. Heyerdahl, Klaveness & Co, Christopher Kahrs Kielland.) Collaboration with the Nazi-German regime, did not result in any company employees being convicted (for collaboration) after the war.

During the Second World War Norsk Hydro collaborated with IG Farben and Nordische Aluminium Aktiengesellschaft (Nordag) in building new aluminium and magnesium plants in support of the German war effort. The construction was however ended on July 24, 1943 when an allied bombardment completely destroyed the facilities, killing 55 construction workers. As Germany's defeat became more likely, Norsk Hydro started to tone down its collaborative relations with the occupier.

In 1946 the Årdal aluminium plant was opened, operated by the state owned company Årdal og Sunndal Verk. In a merger, Hydro acquired this company in 1986, in essence establishing the light metal division Hydro Aluminium.

Since 1919, there had been zinc production and then aluminium production at Glomfjord in Northern Norway. Hydro bought the power plant in 1947 and started ammonia production there instead. In the 1950s Hydro opened a new magnesium plant in Herøya and in 1963 Hydro started in cooperation with Harvey Aluminum, building a plant at Karmøy to produce aluminium. The plant, called Alnor, was purchased in whole by Hydro in 1973.

In 2000, Hydro acquired Wells Aluminum, a network of aluminium extrusion plants in the United States. Two years later, the company acquired the leading German aluminium producer Vereinigte Aluminium Werke from the German utility company E.ON and the French building systems company Technal.

Hydro became a truly integrated aluminium company in 2011, when it acquired the aluminium assets owned by Vale in Brazil for $4.9 billion. This gave Hydro the world's largest alumina refinery and aimed to "secure raw materials for more than a hundred years of aluminum production". Hydro gained a large bauxite supply, including control of the Paragominas mine, one of the largest bauxite mines in the world. It also gained large alumina refining and aluminum production capacity, including a 51 percent stake in the Albras aluminum plant and 91 percent ownership of Alunorte, then the world's largest alumina refinery and now the largest outside China.

=== Into the petroleum age ===
In 1965, Hydro joined Elf Aquitaine and six other French companies to form Petronord to perform search for oil and gas in the North Sea. Hydro soon became a large company in the North Sea petroleum industry, and also became operator of a number of fields, the first being Oseberg.

In 1969, Hydro started its first international operations, with a 25% stake in a fertilizer plant in Qatar.

Hydro acquired in the late 1980s the Mobil service stations in Norway, Sweden and Denmark, changing their name to Hydro. In 1995 Hydro merged its gas stations in Norway and Denmark with Texaco, creating the joint venture HydroTexaco. The service station chain was sold in 2006 to Reitangruppen. In 1999 Hydro acquired Norway's third largest petroleum company Saga Petroleum, which had major upstream operations primarily in Norway and the United Kingdom. The British operations were later sold.

Hydro's fertilizer business was spun off as a separately stock-listed company under the name of Yara International on March 26, 2004. Hydro distributed all its Yara shares to Hydro's shareholders and presently has no ownership in Yara.

In December 2006 Norsk Hydro revealed a proposal to merge their oil business with compatriate oil and gas company Statoil. Under the rules of the EEA the proposal was approved by the European Union on May 3, 2007 and by the Norwegian Parliament on June 8, 2007. The merger was completed by 1 October 2007. Hydro's shareholders took 32.7% of the new company—StatoilHydro—shares.

== Operations ==
=== Aluminium ===
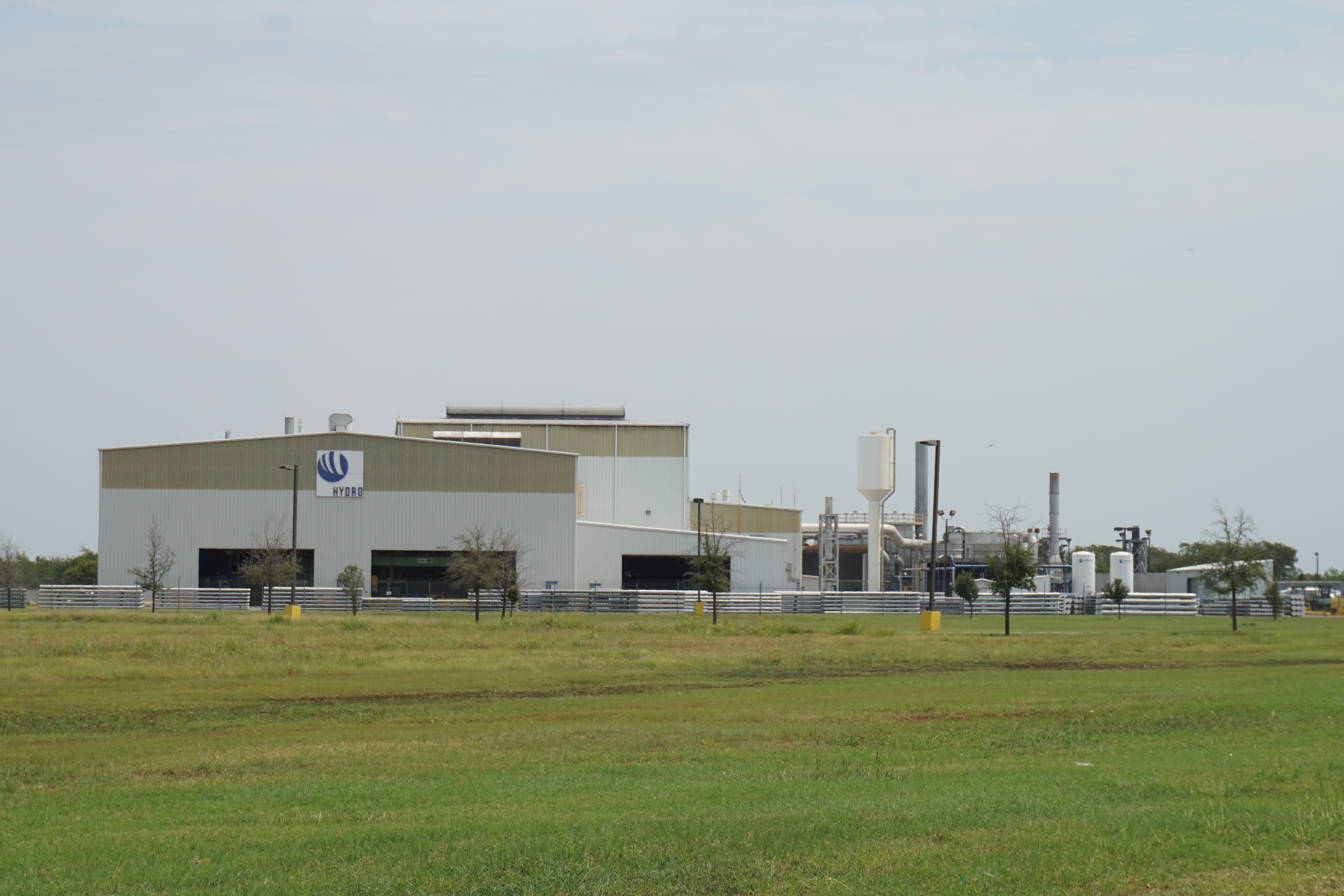
Hydro Aluminum plant in Commerce, Texas

Hydro is one of the largest aluminium companies worldwide. In Norway, Hydro has plants in Magnor, Rjukan, Raufoss, Vennesla, Karmøy, Høyanger, Årdal, Husnes, Sunndalsøra, and Holmestrand. Most of the employees in the company work in plants and offices located outside Norway, such as Hungary, Germany and Brazil. Hydro has more employees in the United States than any other Norwegian company.

In 2010, Hydro and QatarEnergy inaugurated their 50-50 joint venture Qatalum, located in Qatar. It was the largest aluminium plant ever launched in one step. Its annual capacity in September 2011 was 585,000 metric tons of primary aluminium, all to be shipped as value added aluminium casthouse products. A 1350 MW natural gas power plant was also built to ensure a stable supply of electricity.

In 2010, Hydro acquired the Brazilian bauxite, alumina and aluminium production assets of Vale, an international mining and metals company.

In September 2013, Hydro combined its aluminium extrusion operations with that of Sapa, making Sapa a 50/50 joint venture between Hydro and the Norwegian company Orkla. Hydro then acquired Orkla's 50% ownership in Sapa in October 2017, taking over the company and turning it into a new business area within Hydro, called Extruded Solutions. The agreed enterprise value for 100% of Sapa was NOK 27 billion.

=== Energy ===
Hydro is a major producer of hydroelectric power in Norway.

To secure electricity for its aluminium production Hydro has signed a power purchase agreement with the Fosen Vind wind farm, which is scheduled to be fully operational in 2020. Under this agreement Fosen Vind will deliver around 0.6 TWh in 2020, around 1.0 TWh annually from 2021 to 2035 and 0.7 TWh annually from 2036 to 2039, for a total of about 18 TWh over a 20-year period.

=== Hydro Agri ===
Though Hydro started off as a fertilizer producer and agricultural products was for a long time one of the companies major ventures, the agricultural division was in 2004 demerged into the independent company Yara International, listed on the Oslo Stock Exchange.

=== Hydro Global Business Services ===
Hydro Global Business Services was founded In 2020 to deliver Finance, IT, and HR services to all businesses within the Hydro company. The largest hub is in Székesfehérvár, Hungary.

== Environmental issues ==
In February 2018 Hydro was forced to cut aluminium production by 50% in its plant located in Pará, Brazil (operated by the joint venture Albras). This followed allegations that untreated and contaminated water had been released to the environment, resulting in water pollution. A team of local researchers found a clandestine waste pipe and highly elevated levels of aluminum in its proximity. Other substances such as nitrate, sulphate, chloride and lead were also found at abnormally high concentrations. Hydro has since claimed that while some unauthorized spills had happened, their own and independent reports showed no environmental pollution of the river but only a small change in pH.

== Chief Executive Officers ==
- 1905–1917: Sam Eyde
- 1918–1926: Harald Bjerke
- 1926–1941: Axel Aubert
- 1941–1956: Bjarne Eriksen
- 1956–1967: Rolf Østbye
- 1967–1977: Johan B. Holte
- 1977–1984: Odd Narud
- 1984–1991: Torvild Aakvaag
- 1991–2001: Egil Myklebust
- 2001–2009: Eivind Reiten
- 2009–2019: Svein Richard Brandtzæg
- 2019–2024: Hilde Merete Aasheim
- 2024–present: Eivind Kallevik
