= Årdal og Sunndal Verk =

Defunct Norwegian state owned company

Årdal og Sunndal Verk A/S
- Industry: Aluminium
- Founded: 1947
- Defunct: 1986
- Fate: Merger
- Successor: Norsk Hydro
- Headquarters: Norway
- Parent: Norwegian Ministry of Trade and Industry

Årdal og Sunndal Verk or ÅSV is a defunct Norwegian state owned company that operated the aluminium plants in Årdal Municipality, Sunndal Municipality, Høyanger Municipality and Holmestrand Municipality. The company was established to take advantage of the hydro-electric power plants in the respective municipalities to create aluminium plants. The company was founded in 1947 to continue the unfinished production of the Årdal plant started by the German occupational forces during World War II. In 1954 construction on the Sunndal plant started. The company was merged with Norsk Hydro in 1986 to create the light metal division Hydro Aluminium.
