= Relationship of Thorbjørn Jagland and Jeffrey Epstein =

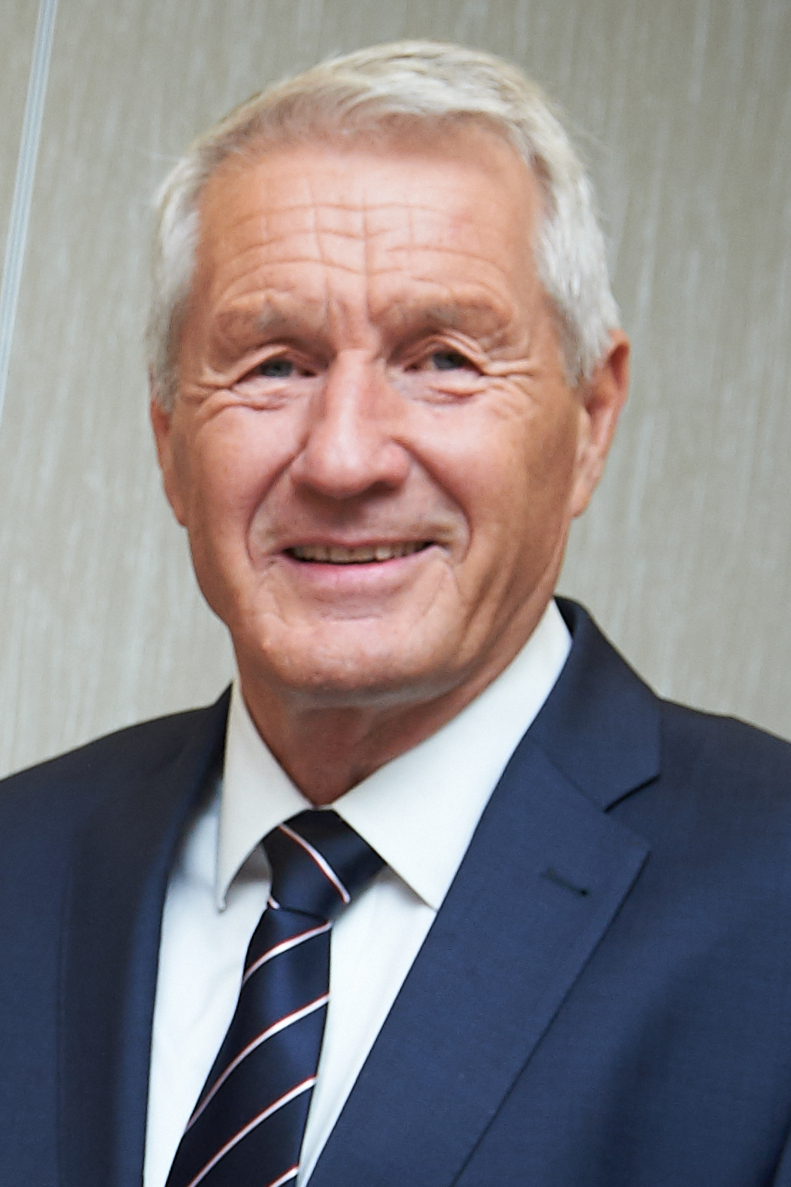
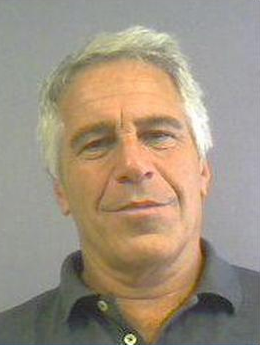
Thorbjørn Jagland (left) and Jeffrey Epstein were in close contact until 2019.

The relationship of former Prime Minister of Norway, Secretary General of the Council of Europe, and chair of the Norwegian Nobel Committee Thorbjørn Jagland with the American convicted child sex offender Jeffrey Epstein has become a major scandal in Norway. Jagland and Epstein maintained a close relationship from 2011 to 2019.

In February 2026, following the release of the Epstein files, Jagland was charged with aggravated corruption over his ties to Epstein.

== History ==
=== 2011–2019 ===
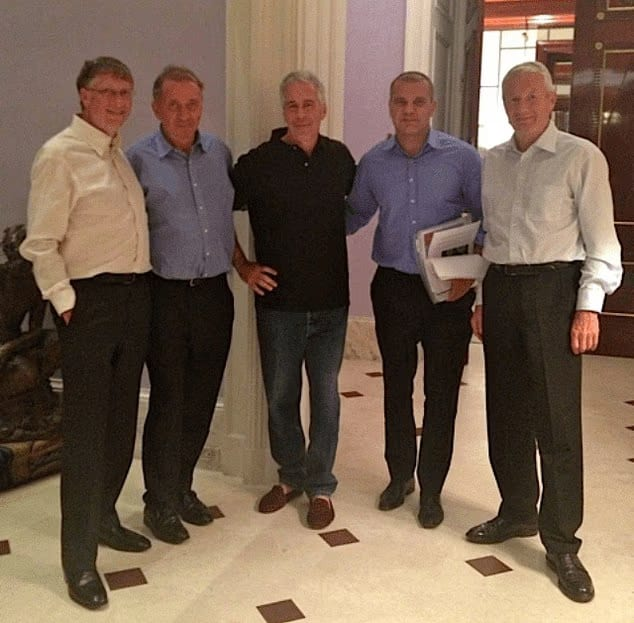
From left to right: Bill Gates, Terje Rød-Larsen, Jeffrey Epstein, Boris Nikolic and Thorbjørn Jagland

Jagland and Epstein maintained a close relationship from 2011 to 2019. On 3 March 2015, Jagland was demoted by the five-person Norwegian Nobel Committee, which elected Kaci Kullmann Five as its new chair. After the demotion, Jagland continued to serve as an ordinary member of the committee. In 2019, the leader of the committee asked each of the members if any of them had been in contact with Epstein; in 2020, Jagland changed his answer; Epstein and Bill Gates had a meeting with Jagland at his residence in Strasbourg in 2013, according to media in October 2020.

In June of 2018 (before the Helenski Summit), Epstein also wrote to Jagland suggesting that Jagland should arrange a meeting between Epstein and Russian Foreign Minister Sergey Lavrov so that Epstein could provide "insight" about Donald Trump. Epstein told associates that Jagland was "not bright", but emphasized his formal positions as useful.

=== 2026 ===
In February 2026, the Norwegian Police Service opened a criminal investigation of Jagland for aggravated corruption related to his ties to Epstein. In response, Norway's foreign minister, Espen Barth Eide, announced that the Støre cabinet would apply to revoke Jagland's immunity for any acts carried out as secretary-general of the Council of Europe, stating that his immunity could not be allowed to stand in the way of the investigation. On 11 February 2026, the Council of Europe's Committee of Ministers waived the immunity.

On 12 February 2026, Jagland was charged with aggravated corruption in connection with the probe.

On 24 February 2026 it was reported that Jagland had been hospitalized a week earlier due to his health situation as a result of the pressure he experienced from the probe and media pressure. A letter from Jagland's lawyer Anders Brosveet stated that the burden on Jagland, and his immediate family, has been challenging, to such an extent that there is a serious danger to life or health. Initial reports of the event framed it as a suicide attempt, which was strongly denied by Jagland's lawyer in a press release. He described the publication as "one of the worst ethical breaches" he has ever experienced. He clarified that while Jagland is hospitalized due to a medical risk, there was a misunderstanding during his conversation with a journalist.

The editor of iNyheter, Helge Lurås responsible for the initial report claimed their reporting was based on information provided to their journalist by Jagland's lawyer, and that he later changed his position. The lawyer later apologized for his comments. As a result of the incident, there was broad public debate in Norway regarding the pressure placed on individuals by press coverage and what information should be made public.

== See also ==
- List of people named in the Epstein files
