= Gerd-Liv Valla =

Norwegian trade unionist (born 1948)

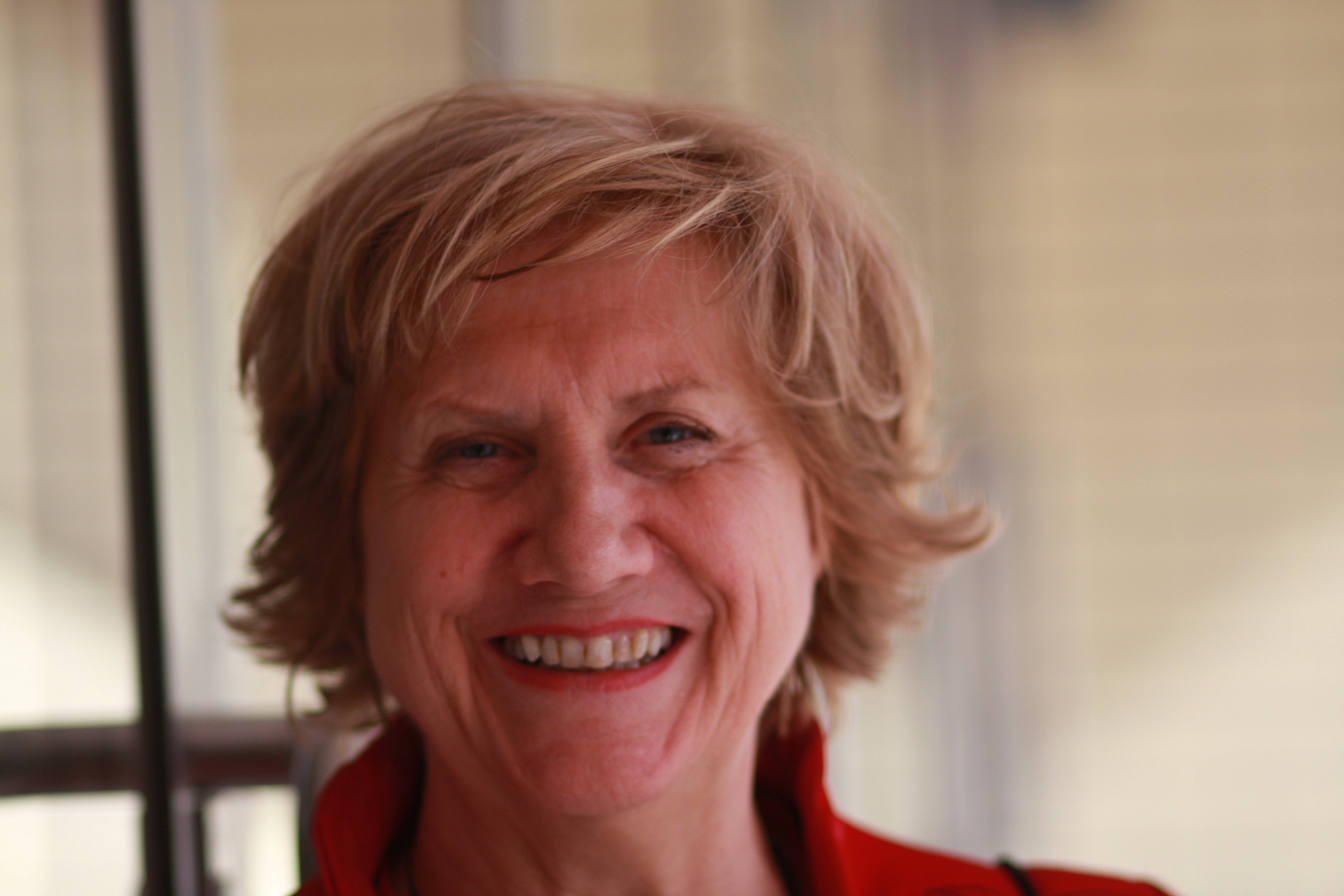

Leader of the Norwegian Confederation of Trade Unions
- In office 2001 – 9 March 2007
- Preceded by: Yngve Hågensen
- Succeeded by: Roar Flåthen

Minister of Justice
- In office 4 February 1997 – 17 October 1997
- Prime Minister: Thorbjørn Jagland
- Preceded by: Anne Holt
- Succeeded by: Aud Inger Aure

State Secretary for the Prime Minister of Norway
- In office 10 January 1992 – 21 January 1994
- Prime Minister: Gro Harlem Brundtland

Political Advisor for the Prime Minister of Norway
- In office 12 November 1990 – 10 January 1992
- Prime Minister: Gro Harlem Brundtland

Personal details
- Born: 25 January 1948 (age 78) Korgen, Nordland, Norway
- Party: Labour
- Spouse: Harald Berntsen
- Children: 1
- Education: University of Oslo

Gerd-Liv Valla (born 25 January 1948 in Korgen, Nordland) is a Norwegian former trade union leader, who served as leader of the Norwegian Confederation of Trade Unions (LO). She took over in 2001 (from former leader, Yngve Hågensen) and resigned in 2007 as a result of the so-called Valla affair. In 1997 she briefly served as minister of justice.

== Early life ==
Valla grew up on a farm near Bjerka in Hemnes Municipality in Nordland county. Their father was active in the Norwegian Agrarian Association, and her brother Nils Valla would become a national leader of this organization. Gerd-Liv Valla moved to Hemnesberget to complete her primary education, and to Mo i Rana for upper secondary school. While living in Mo, she competed for Mo IL in middle distance running and set a Northern Norwegian record in the 800 metres. The time was 2:18.1 minutes, achieved in June 1968 on Bislett stadion.

== Education and professional life ==
Valla has a major degree in political science, with minors in social anthropology and public law. She graduated as cand.polit. from the University of Oslo in 1977, and attended the Department of Teacher Education and School Research at the University of Oslo in 1979. She headed the Norwegian Student Union 1974–75. Valla was politically active in Kommunistisk Universitetslag (KUL), a small communist group. KUL eventually split in 1981 over strong controversy within the group due to differing views on Stalin; Valla supported the pro-Stalin faction within the group during the struggle between the stalinists and the anti-stalinists.

For seven years she was married to historian Harald Berntsen. Together they have a daughter.

She has worked both in the trade unions and as first consultant and office leader at the Research Council of Norway, as well as lector at Eik Teacher Academy in Tønsberg.

In 1997 she was appointed Minister of Justice and the Police in the cabinet Jagland, replacing Anne Holt who left. Valla left the government in late 1997, when Prime Minister Jagland announced his cabinet's resignation as a result of the 36.9 ultimatum and was replaced by the first cabinet Bondevik.

== The Valla affair ==
In January 2007 Valla was accused of harassment and of having an authoritarian management style by Ingunn Yssen, who had been the director of the Norwegian Confederation of Trade Unions's office for international affairs and previously served as Valla's state secretary in the Ministry of Justice. This became known as the Valla affair and sparked enormous media interest in Valla, generating heated debate over her future as leader of the Norwegian Confederation of Trade Unions. On 9 March, under massive pressure, she announced her resignation after an inquiry appointed by the Executive Committee of the Norwegian Confederation of Trade Unions concluded that she had harassed Yssen and that she and LO had violated several Norwegian labor laws. Later in 2007 Valla published a book about the Valla affair, titled Prosessen (after Kafka's The Trial). Also Torstein Tranøy and Ingunn Yssen published books about the affair.

Ivar Hippe was one of her political consultants when the controversy started.

== Literature ==
- Gerd-Liv Valla: Prosessen, Cappelen Damm, Oslo, 2007, ISBN 8202275520, ISBN 9788202275525
- Torstein Tranøy: Vallas fall: et innblikk i den skjulte maktkampen, Forlaget Manifest, Oslo, 2007, ISBN 9788292866023.
- Ingunn Yssen: Vi kan alle bli den lille. Aschehoug 2009.
- Bente Hessenschmidt Gundelsby: Kampen om definisjonsmakten: Politiske kommentatorers tolkningsrammer i Valla-saken, University of Oslo, 2008

Legal offices
| Preceded by Anne Holt | Norwegian Minister of Justice and the Police; February 1997–October 1997 | Succeeded by Aud Inger Aure |
Trade union offices
| Preceded by Yngve Hågensen | Leader of the Norwegian Confederation of Trade Unions; 2001–2007 | Succeeded by Roar Flåthen |
