= Martin Kolberg =

Norwegian politician

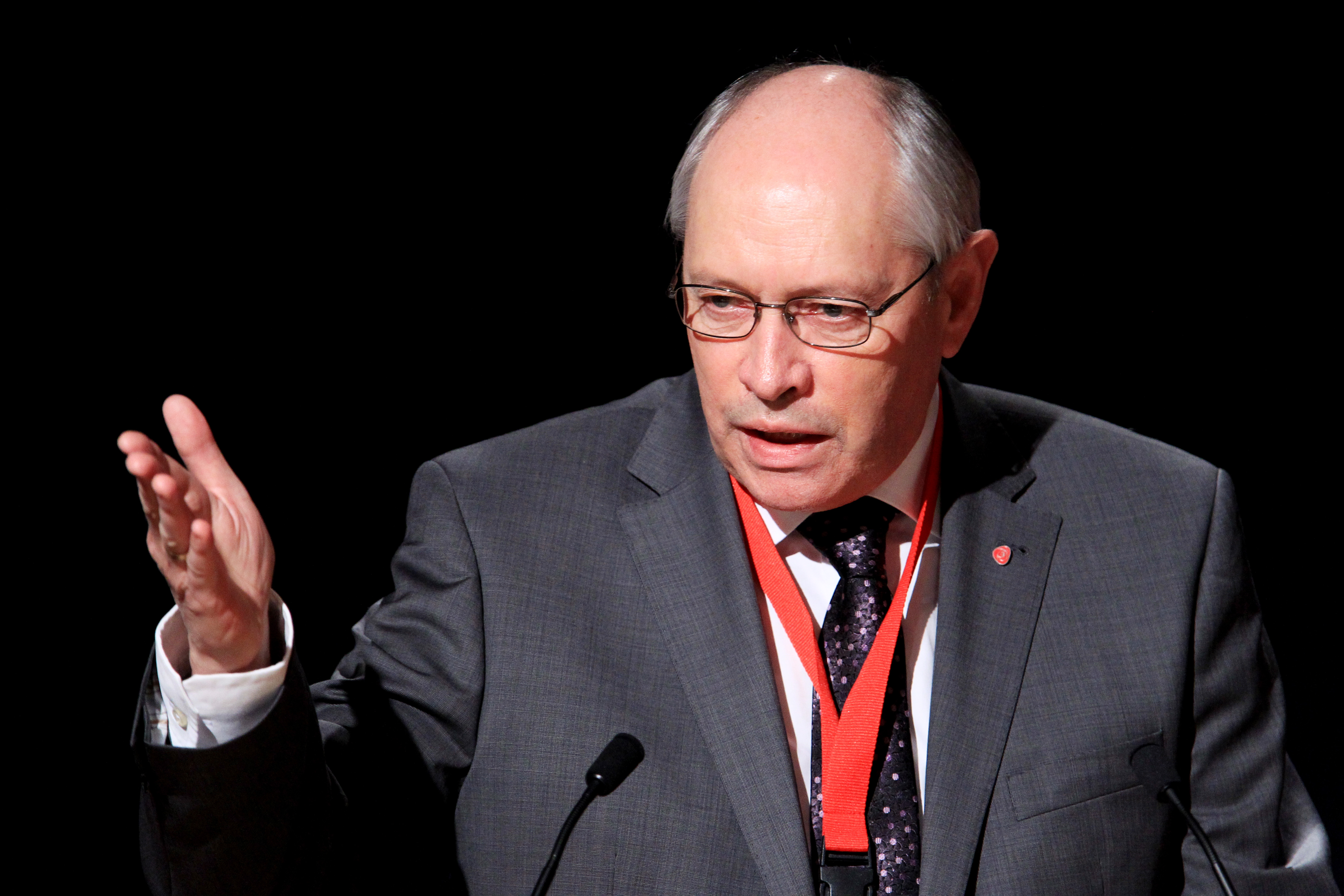

Party Secretary of the Labour Party
- In office 10 November 2002 – 18 April 2009
- Leader: Jens Stoltenberg
- Preceded by: Solveig Torsvik
- Succeeded by: Raymond Johansen

Member of the Storting
- In office 1 October 2009 – 30 September 2021
- Constituency: Buskerud

Deputy Member of the Storting
- In office 1 October 2001 – 30 September 2005
- Deputising for: Thorbjørn Jagland (2001)
- Preceded by: Frank Willy Larsen
- Constituency: Buskerud
- In office 1 October 1977 – 30 September 1981
- Constituency: Buskerud

Personal details
- Born: 24 February 1949 (age 77) Drammen, Buskerud, Norway
- Party: Labour
- Spouse: Aud Harriet Kolberg
- Occupation: Politician

Martin Kolberg (born 24 February 1949) is a Norwegian politician for the Labour Party. He served as the party secretary from 2002 until 2009 and an MP from Buskerud from 2009 until 2021.

He was elected to the Parliament of Norway in 2009 and led the Standing Committee on Scrutiny and Constitutional Affairs from 2013 to 2017.

== Early life and education ==
Kolberg was born in the city of Drammen, Buskerud. He is the son of railroad worker Kjell O. J. Kolberg (1921–) and homemaker Ruth Utengen (1921–2006). After finishing primary school, Kolberg attended Oslo Technical College, but later dropped out. He since completed training as an electrician. He held a variety of jobs, including mailman, lab assistant at a cable wire factory and also as assistant at the local shoe-factory.

== Political career ==
Kolberg served as a deputy representative in the Norwegian Parliament from 1977 to 1981. He served as a deputy representative for the second time from 2001 to 2005, and met regularly from 1 October to 19 October 2001 while Thorbjørn Jagland was Minister of Foreign Affairs. In total he met 144 days as a deputy.

From 13 July 1995 to 25 October 1996, Kolberg was state secretary at the Office of the Prime Minister under the third cabinet Brundtland. When the new cabinet Jagland was announced, it became clear that the new prime minister, Thorbjørn Jagland, who was also Kolberg's childhood friend, had discarded him as state secretary. Kolberg reacted with anger and frustration, and the media portrayed the matter as Jagland firing his best friend. Jagland stated that "Martin had wanted to work for Gro [Harlem Brundtland] ... I really wanted him to work as party secretary". To Kolberg's reaction, Jagland stated: "I followed an agreement between us, and I thought he did not want the job. I am very surprised by his reaction". Jagland further stated that it was all a misunderstanding, because he Jagland thought that Kolberg did not want to work with "the Norwegian House". Five days later, Kolberg was appointed state secretary in the Ministry of Defence, where he remained until the cabined withdrew on 17 October 1997, following the defeat in the 1997 election.

From 2002 to 2009, he served as the party secretary of the Labour Party, when he stepped down in order to stand in the 2009 election. He was succeeded by Raymond Johansen. Several others were seen as candidates for the post, including Trond Giske and Bjarne Håkon Hanssen.

Party political offices
Preceded by Solveig Torsvik	Party Secretary of the Labour Party; 2002–2009	Succeeded by Raymond Johansen
