= Kommunistisk Universitetslag =

Norwegian Communist student organisation

Kommunistisk Universitetslag (KUL) was a revolutionary student organisation in Norway. It was founded in 1973 in the philosophy and social economics departments of the University of Oslo, and ceased political activities in 1981. KUL published the university newspaper Gnisten.

== Political alignment ==
The movement had a theoretical schooling in Marxism. At its foundation, KUL was aligned with a national communist Leninism, and was generally critical of Soviet communism both during and after Stalin. Over time, similarly to the AKP(m-l), the organisation aligned itself with the politics of the People's Republic of China. KUL later criticised the political changes in China after the death of Mao Zedong in 1976, while supporting the systems in Albania and other socialist countries.

== History ==
KUL considered the Norwegian Workers' Communist Party (AKP(m-l)) as a parochial organisation, and argued that a Marxist analysis meant that individual groups must join together to form a reactionary class. They also criticised the AKP(m-l) for their nationalism and militarism. Ideologically, KUL stood even further to the left than the AKP(m-l).

KUL worked together with the Kommunistisk Arbeiderforbund (KA) and aligned themselves with the student organisation. KUL also worked together for a short time with the Kommunistiske Arbeidsgrupper (KAG) at the University of Bergen. KUL were strongest in Oslo, but also had branches in Tromsø, Trondheim and Ås, but not in Bergen, although parts of the (KAG) often joined together with them.

KUL's criticism of Soviet communism, both during and after Stalin, contrasted with the mostly positive attitudes towards Stalin in the KA. The first splits with the KA came in winter 1980. The KUL then ceased their political activity from 1981.

Notable members of the group include Espen Søbye, Gerd-Liv Valla, Harald Berntsen, Ole Jacob Bull, and Nils Johan Ringdal.
