= Kaci Kullmann Five =

Norwegian politician (1951–2017)

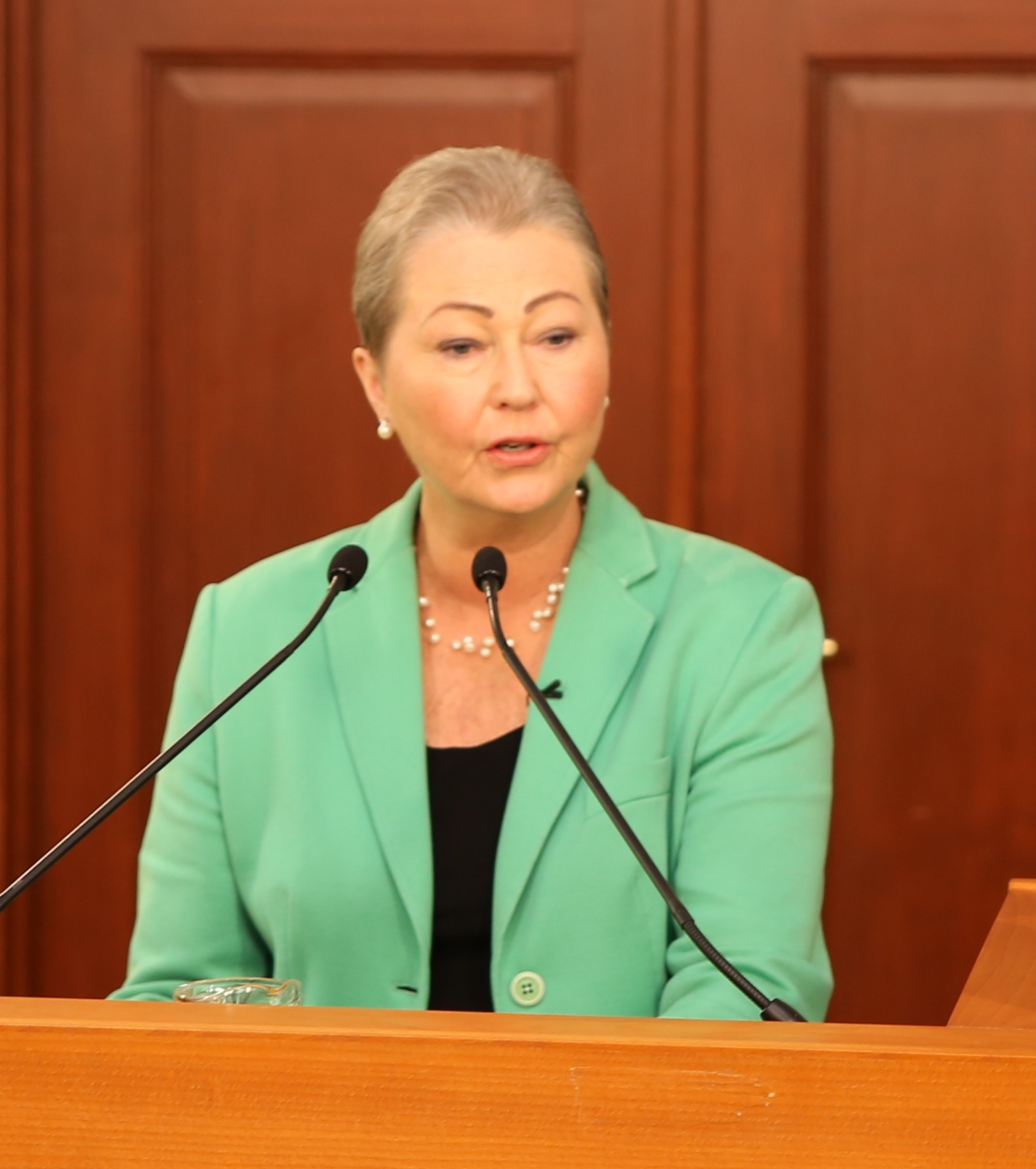

Chairwoman of the Norwegian Nobel Committee
- In office 3 March 2015 – 19 February 2017
- Preceded by: Thorbjørn Jagland
- Succeeded by: Berit Reiss-Andersen

Leader of the Conservative Party
- In office 20 April 1991 – 10 April 1994
- Deputy: John G. Bernander
- Preceded by: Jan P. Syse
- Succeeded by: Jan Petersen
- In office 1 January 1988 – 22 January 1988; Acting
- Preceded by: Rolf Presthus
- Succeeded by: Jan P. Syse

Member of the Norwegian Parliament
- In office 1 October 1981 – 30 September 1997
- Constituency: Akershus

Minister of Trade and Shipping
- In office 16 October 1989 – 3 November 1990
- Prime Minister: Jan P. Syse
- Preceded by: Jan Balstad
- Succeeded by: Eldrid Nordbø

First Deputy Leader of the Conservative Party
- In office 25 August 1984 – 22 January 1988
- Leader: Erling Norvik; Rolf Presthus
- Preceded by: Håkon Randal
- Succeeded by: Wenche Frogn Sellæg

Second Deputy Leader of the Conservative Party
- In office 19 March 1982 – 25 August 1984
- Leader: Jo Benkow
- Preceded by: Astrid Gjertsen
- Succeeded by: Arne Skauge

Personal details
- Born: Karin Cecilie Kullman; 13 April 1951 Bærum, Akershus, Norway
- Died: 19 February 2017 (aged 65) Oslo, Norway
- Party: Conservative
- Spouse: Carsten O. Five (1972–2017; her death)
- Children: 2
- Education: University of Oslo

Karin Cecilie "Kaci" Kullmann Five (pronounced [ˈkɑːsɪ ˈkʉlːmɑn ˈfiːvə]; 13 April 1951 – 19 February 2017) was a Norwegian politician for the Conservative Party. She served as a member of parliament from 1981 to 1997, as Minister of Trade and Shipping in the Ministry of Foreign Affairs from 1989 to 1990 and as leader of the Conservative Party from 1991 to 1994. After she left politics in 1997, she held roles in private business, ran her own consultancy and was a board member of Statoil and other companies and organisations.

She was elected by the Storting as a member of the Norwegian Nobel Committee in 2003, became a board member of the Nobel Foundation in 2009 and served as chairwoman of the Norwegian Nobel Committee from 2015 until her death; in this capacity she was responsible for awarding the Nobel Peace Prize.

== Biography ==
Five was born Karin Cecilie Kullmann in Bærum, the daughter of a dentist, and was better known by the nickname "Kaci" (pronounced [kasi]). After finishing upper secondary school at Nadderud in 1969 she was educated in law, French language and political science, and graduated with the cand.polit. degree in political science at the University of Oslo in 1981. Before she entered politics she was a consultant at the Norwegian Confederation of Norwegian Enterprise (NHO). In 1972 she married Carsten O. Five, former editor of the finance magazine Dine Penger. They have two children.

In early 2014, she was diagnosed with breast cancer and began treatment for it. While her initial prognosis was good, the illness worsened, and in 2016 she had to cancel several appearances.

Five died on 19 February 2017 from breast cancer, aged 65.

== Political career ==
Five was member of the municipal council of Bærum 1975–81 and then served as deputy leader of the executive committee for Education. From 1977 to 1979 she was the first female President of the Norwegian Young Conservatives.

She was a member of the Norwegian parliament, the Storting, from 1981 to 1997. She was Deputy Chairwoman of the Conservative Opposition 1986–1989, and again 1990–1991. From 1982 to 1988 she also served as Deputy Party Chairwoman. She served as Minister of Trade and Shipping in the Cabinet Syse from 1989 to 1990. In 1991 she was elected chairwoman of the Conservative Party, succeeding Jan P. Syse, but resigned after four years in 1994.

== After politics ==
After leaving parliament in 1997, Five served as managing director in Aker RGI until 2001, and since 2002 remained active as an independent consultant. She was a member of the Board of Directors of several large companies and organisations, including Statoil, Norway's largest petroleum company, Scheiblers Legacy, SOS Kinderdorf Norway and Radio Channel P4.

== Nobel Prize roles ==
Kaci Kullmann Five was elected by the Storting as a deputy member of the Norwegian Nobel Committee, which awards the Nobel Peace Prize, for the term 2000–03. In 2003, she was elected as one of the five regular members and was reelected up until her death in 2017. In March 2015, she was elected by the committee as its new chairperson, succeeding Thorbjørn Jagland, marking the first time in the history of the 1900 founded committee that the incumbent chairman was replaced without retiring deliberately. From 2009 until 2017, she was one of the seven regular board members of the Sweden-based Nobel Foundation, which has the overall responsibility for all the five Nobel Prizes.

As a member of the Norwegian Nobel Committee, she was involved in the decisions to award the Nobel Peace Prize to, among others, Shirin Ebadi, Al Gore, Martti Ahtisaari, Barack Obama, Liu Xiaobo, Juan Manuel Santos, and the European Union. She praised Thorbjørn Jagland for his leadership of the Nobel committee and stated that she supported all the prizes awarded when Jagland was chairman. She harshly criticized the People's Republic of China over its treatment of Nobel laureate Liu Xiaobo; she demanded that the Chinese communist regime releases Liu Xiaobo and "stops persecuting his wife."

== Publications ==
- Erfaringer med etableringsloven. Cand.polit. dissertation in political science, University of Oslo, 1981.
- Det nye Europa, with Jan Petersen. Oslo: Conservative Party of Norway, 1990.
- Avslutningstale på Høyres landsmøte 1991. Oslo: Conservative Party of Norway, 1991.
- "Norges plass i europeisk samarbeid". In: Norsk militært tidsskrift, no. 12, 1992.

Party political offices
| Preceded by Per Kristian Foss | Chair of the Norwegian Young Conservatives; 1977–1979 | Succeeded by Terje Osmundsen |
| Preceded by Jan Peder Syse | Chair of the Conservative Party; 1991–1994 | Succeeded by Jan Petersen |
Political offices
| Preceded by Jan Balstad | Norwegian Minister of Trade and Shipping; 1989–1990 | Succeeded by Eldrid Nordbø |
Academic offices
| Preceded by Thorbjørn Jagland | Chair of the Norwegian Nobel Committee; 2015–2017 | Succeeded by Berit Reiss-Andersen |
