= Communist Workers League =

Communist Workers League is the name of several organisations:

- Communist Workers League (Norway)
- Communist Workers League (Senegal)
- Communist Workers League (Spain)
- Communist Workers League (Sweden)

== See also ==
- Workers Communist League (disambiguation)
