= Anne Holt =

Norwegian author, lawyer and former Minister of Justice

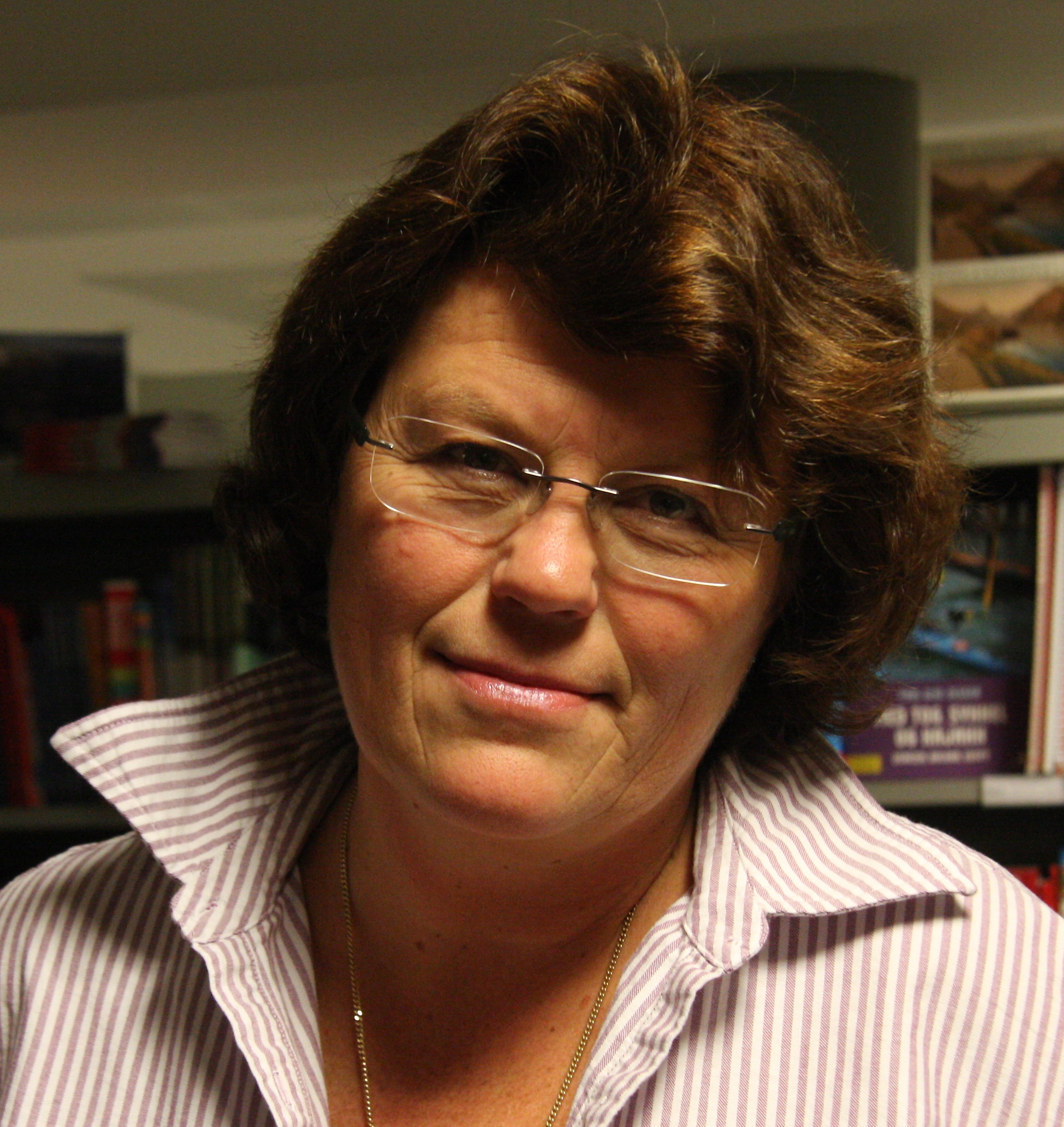
- Anne Holt
- Born: 16 November 1958 (age 67); Larvik, Norway
- Occupation: Crime novelist
- Writing career
- Genres: Crime fiction, thriller fiction,
- Notable works: What is Mine (2001), What Never Happens (2004)

Minister of Justice
- In office 25 October 1996 – 4 February 1997
- Prime Minister: Torbjørn Jagland
- Preceded by: Grete Faremo
- Succeeded by: Gerd-Liv Valla

Personal details
- Party: Labour Party
- Website: www.piratforlaget.se/forfattare/anne-holt/

Anne Holt (born 16 November 1958) is a Norwegian author, lawyer and former Minister of Justice.

== Early life ==
She was born in Larvik, grew up in Lillestrøm and Tromsø, and moved to Oslo in 1978. Holt graduated with a law degree from the University of Bergen in 1986, and worked for The Norwegian Broadcasting Corporation (NRK) in the period 1984 to 1988.

== Career ==
She then worked at the Oslo Police Department for two years, earning her right to practise as a lawyer in Norway. In 1990 she returned to NRK, where she worked one year as a journalist and anchor woman for the news program Dagsrevyen.

Anne Holt started her own law practice in 1994, and served as the Minister of Justice in Cabinet Jagland for a short period from 25 October 1996 to 4 February 1997. She resigned for health reasons, and was replaced by Gerd-Liv Valla.

=== Writing ===
In 1993, she made her debut as a novelist with the crime novel Blind gudinne, featuring the lesbian police officer Hanne Wilhelmsen. The two novels Løvens gap (1997) and Uten ekko (2000) are co-authored with her former state secretary Berit Reiss-Andersen.

Her 2015 novel Offline is about a terrorist attack on an Islamic cultural center by a group of extreme Norwegian nationalists.

She is one of the most successful crime novelists in Norway. She has been published in 25 countries. Val McDermid, a Scottish crime writer, has said that "Anne Holt is the latest crime writer to reveal how truly dark it gets in Scandinavia".

=== Piratforlaget ===
In 2004, Holt took part in the founding of the Norwegian branch of the Swedish publishing house, Piratforlaget, which had been started by the celebrated Swedish authors Jan Guillou and Liza Marklund. The objective, to publish bestselling writers at reduced prices, was controversial in Scandinavia, where book prices and author advances are highly standardized. Anders Heger, head of the Cappelen publishing house, expressed a widespread concern that Piratforlag would "intensify differences" between "the authors who earn a lot and those who don't".

== Political views ==
Holt is a social democrat and a lifelong member of the Labour Party. She is outspoken against racism.

In 2012, Holt wrote an op-ed in Dagbladet about the Norwegian Labour Party and the time after Anders Behring Breivik's terror attacks in Norway in 2011.

In 2017, Holt wrote an op-ed in Dagens Nyheter in which she rejected the far-right view that Sweden's immigration policies were reckless and dangerous.

== Honours and awards ==
She has won several awards, including the Riverton Prize (1994) for Salige er de som tørster, the Bokhandler Prize (1995) for Demonens død, and the Cappelen Prize (2001).

== Personal life ==
She lives in Oslo with her registered partner Anne Christine Kjær (also known as Tine Kjær) and their daughter Iohanne.

== Bibliography ==
=== The Hanne Wilhelmsen series ===
- 1993 Blind gudinne (Blind Goddess)
- 1994 Salige er de som tørster (Blessed Are Those Who Thirst)
- 1995 Demonens død (Death of the Demon)
- 1997 Løvens gap (co-authored with Berit Reiss-Andersen) (The Lion's Mouth)
- 1999 Død joker (Dead Joker)
- 2000 Uten ekko (co-authored with Berit Reiss-Andersen) (No Echo)
- 2003 Sannheten bortenfor (The Truth Beyond)
- 2007 1222
- 2015 Offline (Offline/Odd Numbers)
- 2016 I støv og aske (In Dust and Ashes)

=== Separate titles ===
- 1997 Mea culpa
- 1998 I hjertet av VM. En fotballreise (co-authored with Erik Langbråten)
- 1999 Bernhard Pinkertons store oppdrag
- 2010 Flimmer (co-authored with Even Holt)
- 2014 Sudden death (co-authored with Even Holt)

=== The Vik/Stubø series ===
- 2001 Det som er mitt (What is Mine/Punishment ISBN 978-0-446-17818-1)
- 2004 Det som aldri skjer (What never happens/The Final Murder ISBN 978-0-446-57803-5)
- 2006 Presidentens valg (Madam President/Death in Oslo ISBN 978-0-7515-3716-1)
- 2009 Pengemannen (Fear Not)
- 2012 Skyggedød (What Dark Clouds Hide)

Awards
Preceded by Gro Dahle	Recipient of the Cappelen Prize; 2001	Succeeded by Jan Jakob Tønseth
Preceded by Grete Faremo	Minister of Justice and Public Security; 1996–1997	Succeeded by Gerd-Liv Valla
