= E24 (Norwegian online newspaper) =

Norwegian business newspaper

E24, formerly E24 Næringsliv and N24, is a Norwegian, online business newspaper originally launched on 18 April 2006, merged with Dine Penger in 2013, and rebranded as E24 in 2019.

== History ==
During the first three years of operation, the newspaper was owned 60% by Aftenposten and 40% by Verdens Gang (VG), both fully owned by public media company Schibsted. Verdens Gang (VG) owns 100% of E24 Næringsliv.

In the course of the first week of operations it became the largest business web site in Norway. In week 46, 2008, it had 575,000 unique users per week.

In 2013 E24 Næringsliv merged with monthly business magazine Dine Penger.
