= Workers Communist League =

The Workers Communist League may refer to:

- The Workers Communist League (Gitlowites), a 1933 U.S. political group
- The Workers' Communist League (New Zealand), a 1980 New Zealand splinter offshoot of the Communist Party of New Zealand

== See also ==
- Communist Workers League (disambiguation)
