= Carsten O. Five =

Norwegian financial adviser, editor and politician

Carsten Ole Five (born 2 May 1949) is a Norwegian financial adviser, editor and former politician for the Conservative Party. He was married to the politician Kaci Kullmann Five.

He graduated with the cand.polit. degree in political science at the University of Oslo in 1976. He is best known as founder, editor-in-chief and managing director of Norway's largest financial magazine Dine Penger during the years 1983–2002.

Five was a member of the Bærum municipal council 1972–1982 and of Akershus county council 1984–1987.

He was married to Kaci Kullmann Five from 1972 until her death in 2017. They have two children.
