= Vidar Brynsplass =

Norwegian politician (born 1950)

Vidar Brynsplass (born 1 August 1950) is a Norwegian politician for the Labour Party.

He served as a deputy representative to the Norwegian Parliament from Buskerud during the term 1993–1997. From 1996 to 1997 he served as a regular representative meanwhile Thorbjørn Jagland was Prime Minister. On the local level he was a member of Kongsberg municipality council from 1991 to 1999.

Outside politics he was a factory worker in Kongsberg from 1966 to 1987, worked two years in insurance before becoming active in the local trade union.
