= Aud-Inger Aure =

Norwegian politician (1942–2023)

Minister of Justice
- In office 17 October 1997 – 15 March 1999
- Prime Minister: Kjell Magne Bondevik
- Preceded by: Gerd-Liv Valla
- Succeeded by: Odd Einar Dørum

Personal details
- Born: 12 November 1942 Averøya, Møre og Romsdal, German-occupied Norway
- Died: 7 June 2023 (aged 80)
- Party: Christian Democratic

Aud-Inger Aure (12 November 1942 – 7 June 2023) was a Norwegian politician for the Christian Democratic Party. Born in Averøya in Møre og Romsdal county, she was awarded a Candidate of Law degree in 1993. From 1989 to 1990 she represented her county in the Storting, while Kjell Magne Bondevik was Minister of Foreign Affairs in the government of Jan P. Syse. On 17 October 1997, she was appointed Minister of Justice and the Police in the first government of Kjell Magne Bondevik.

On 21 January 1999, Aure took a leave of absence due to a minor heart attack, at which point Dagfinn Høybråten took over her duties as acting minister of Justice and the Police. Even though she made a full recovery, Aure eventually gave up on the prospect of returning to her position, and on 15 March she made her absence permanent by resignation. The ministry was taken over by Odd Einar Dørum. After this Aure returned to her position as mayor of Kristiansund Municipality, a position she had held also before her appointment to the ministry.

Aure died on 7 June 2023, at the age of 80.

== Sources ==
- "Kjell Magne Bondevik's First Government 1997-2000". Government.no. 12 December 2006.
- Bård Gultvedt, Helje Solberg (21 January 1999). "Justisminister Aure er sykemeldt" (in Norwegian). Verdens Gang.
- "Dørum fikk justisnøkkel av gråtkvalt Aure" (in Norwegian). Verdens Gang. 15 March 1999.

Legal offices
Preceded by Gerd-Liv Valla	Norwegian Minister of Justice and the Police; 1997–1999	Succeeded by Odd Einar Dørum
