= Solveig Torsvik =

Norwegian politician

Member of the Norwegian Parliament for Akershus
- In office 1993–1997

Personal details
- Born: 30 December 1954 (age 71) Stange, Norway
- Party: Labour Party

Solveig Torsvik (born 30 December 1954 in Stange, Norway) is a Norwegian politician for the Labour Party.

Torsvik was elected to the Norwegian Parliament from Akershus in 1993, but was not re-elected in 1997. She had previously served in the position of deputy representative during the term 1981–1985, 1985–1989 and 1989–1993. From 1986 to 1989 she met as a regular representative when Helen Marie Bøsterud was appointed to the Cabinet, and the same thing happened from 1992 to 1993, when Reiulf Steen was absent.

When Gro Harlem Brundtland formed her third cabinet in 1990, Torsvik was appointed State Secretary in the Ministry of Ministry of Local Government, a position she held until 1992. In October 2006 she was appointed as a political advisor in the Norwegian Ministry of Health and Care Services.

On the local level, Torsvik was a member of the municipal council for Lørenskog Municipality from 1975 to 1983. She chaired the countywide party chapter from 1990 to 1993, and was the national party secretary from 1996 to 2002.

Political offices
| Preceded by Oddrunn Pettersen | Chair of the Standing Committee on Transport; May 1989–September 1989 | Succeeded by John S. Tveit |
Party political offices
| Preceded by Dag Terje Andersen | Party secretary of the Labour Party; 1996–2002 | Succeeded by Martin Kolberg |
