= Yngve Hågensen =

Norwegian labour union leader (1938–2023)

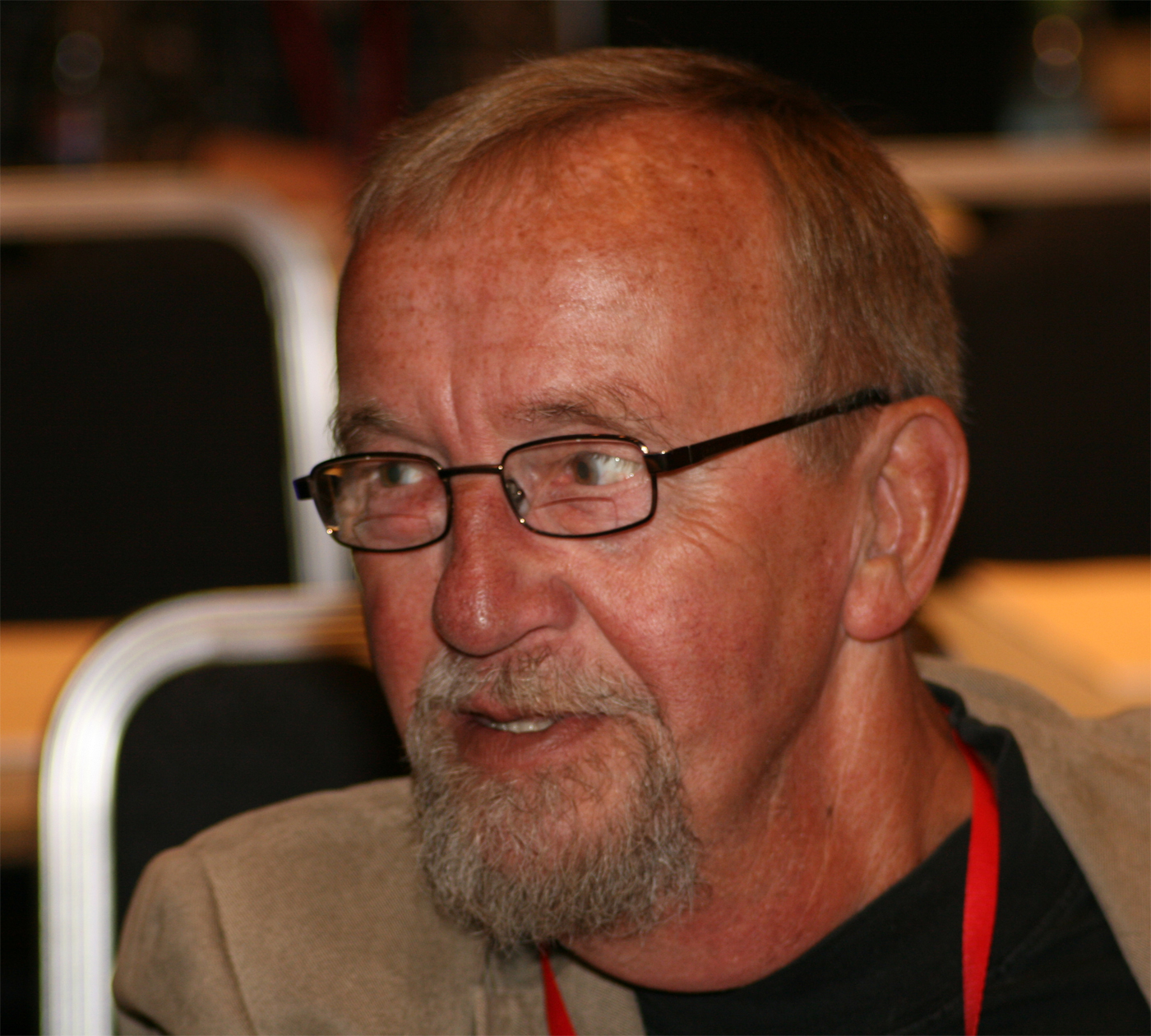
Hågensen in 2009

Yngve Hågensen (13 July 1938 – 17 June 2023) was a Norwegian labour union leader.

== Biography ==
Hågensen was born in Vardø on 13 July 1938. He was a son of fisherman Johan Rasmussen Vinje and Helene Leonore Nilsen. In 1969, he married secretary Astrid Lauritzen.

From an early age Hågensen was active in Norwegian organisation life and politics. He was most notable for his 12 years in office (1989–2001) as leader of the Norwegian Confederation of Trade Unions.

After his last term as trade union leader in 2001, he left the organisation, but remained active in Norwegian politics as a political consultant. Hågensen was also part of the electoral campaign of the Norwegian Labour Party. He was also heavily involved in senior citizen-related politics and adult education causes. From 1972, he was a strong supporter of the proposed Norwegian membership in the European Union.

Hågensen wrote an autobiography titled "Gjør din plikt, krev din rett" (ISBN 82-03-22969-7) (literally "Do your duty, claim your right").

Hågensen died on 17 June 2023, at the age of 84.

Trade union offices
| Preceded by Leif Haraldseth | Leader of the Norwegian Confederation of Trade Unions; 1989–2001 | Succeeded by Gerd-Liv Valla |
