= Berit Reiss-Andersen =

Member of the Norwegian Nobel Committee

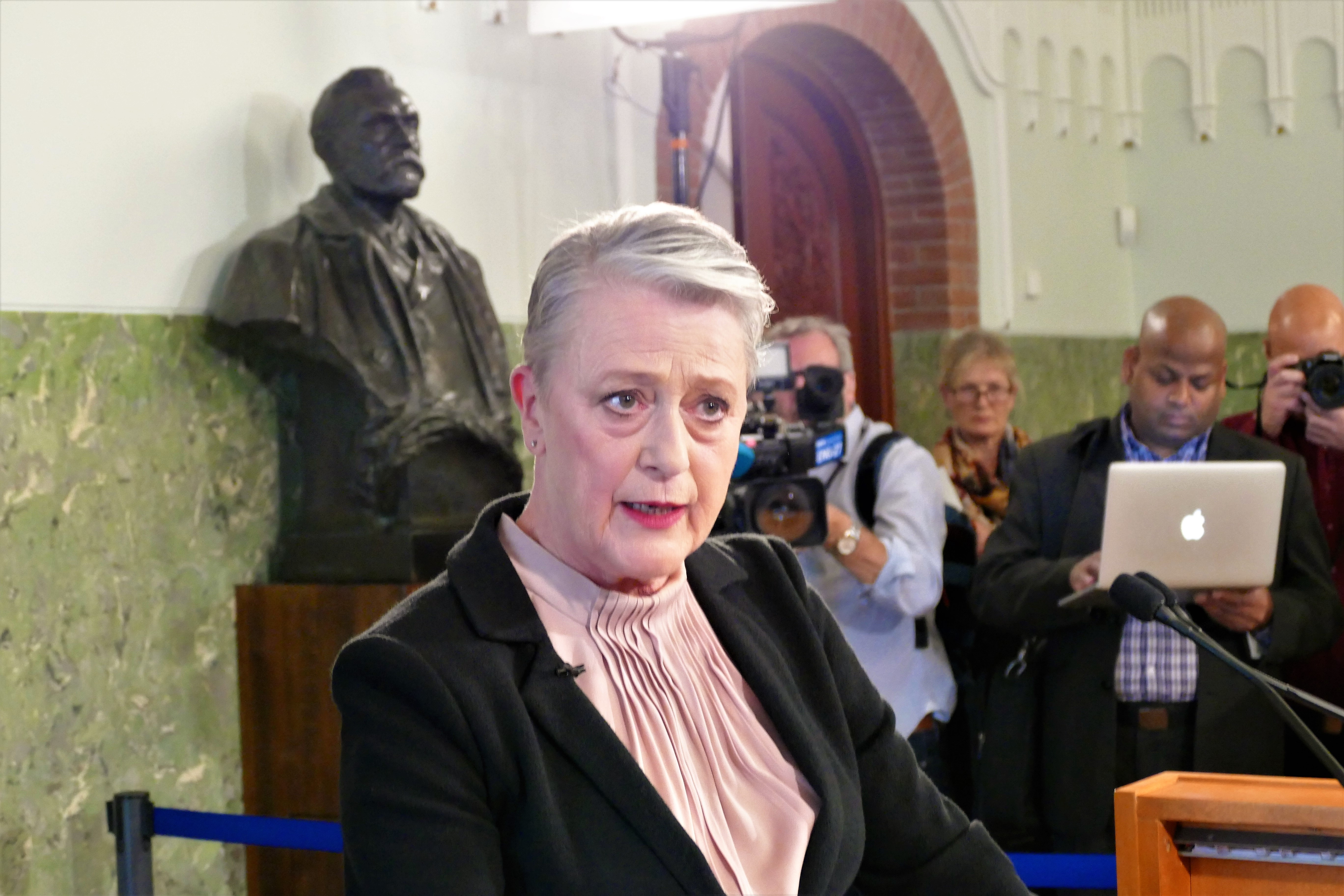

Chairwoman of the Norwegian Nobel Committee
- In office 20 February 2017 – 31 December 2023
- Preceded by: Kaci Kullmann Five

Board Member of the Nobel Foundation
- In office 2014–2023

Member of the Norwegian Nobel Committee
- In office 1 January 2012 – 31 December 2017

President of the Norwegian Bar Association
- In office 2008–2012
- Preceded by: Anders Ryssdal
- Succeeded by: Erik Keiserud

State Secretary for the Minister of Justice and Police
- In office 7 November 1996 – 4 April 1997
- Prime Minister: Thorbjørn Jagland
- Minister: Anne Holt; Gerd-Liv Valla
- Preceded by: Ingeborg Moen Borgerud
- Succeeded by: Ingunn Yssen

Personal details
- Born: 11 July 1954 (age 71) Drøbak, Akershus, Norway
- Party: Labour
- Spouse: Pjotr Sapegin (formerly)
- Profession: Lawyer

Berit Reiss-Andersen (born 11 July 1954) is a Norwegian lawyer, author and former politician for the Norwegian Labour Party. She is a member of the Norwegian Nobel Committee, the 5-member committee that awards the Nobel Peace Prize. She is also a board member of the Nobel Foundation, which has the overall responsibility for all the five Nobel Prizes. She served as state secretary for the Minister of Justice and Police from 1996 to 1997 and as president of the Norwegian Bar Association from 2008 to 2012. She has co-authored two crime novels with former Minister of Justice Anne Holt. She is currently a partner at DLA Piper's Oslo office.

== Legal career ==
Reiss Andersen earned her Candidate of Jurisprudence degree (a 6-year law degree) in 1981 at the University of Oslo, Norway's preeminent university. She was an executive officer at the Norwegian Office of Immigration 1981–1982 and legal adviser at the Royal Ministry of Justice and the Police 1982–1984. She served as a prosecutor with the Oslo Police District 1984–1987. From 1987 to 2016 she had her own law practice in Oslo, and she obtained the right to appear before the Supreme Court of Norway in 1995. In 1997 she was appointed as one of the regular defence counsels at Oslo District Court and Borgarting Court of Appeal. In 2016 she became a partner at DLA Piper's Oslo office. She was president of the Norwegian Bar Association from 2008 to 2012.

== Political career ==
She served as state secretary for the Minister of Justice and Police from 1996 to 1997, in the Labour Party government of Thorbjørn Jagland.

== Nobel Prize roles ==
She was elected as a Member of the Norwegian Nobel Committee by the Storting (Parliament) on 22 November 2011, and was nominated by the Norwegian Labour Party. Her term started 1 January 2012 and ends 31 December 2017. On 20 February 2017 she became the acting chairman of the committee, following the death of Kaci Kullmann Five. On 2 May 2017, she was formally elected as the chairman of the Norwegian Nobel Committee, through 2023. In this capacity Reiss-Andersen selects the Nobel Peace Prize laureate together with the four other committee members.

From 2014 she is also a board member of the Nobel Foundation, which has the overall responsibility for all the five Nobel Prizes.

Reiss-Andersen has criticized Erna Solberg over her silence on Nobel Peace Prize laureate Liu Xiaobo when he was dying in prison in China and the Norwegian government refused to say whether it supported the European Union's demand that Liu be released; Reiss-Andersen described Solberg and her right-wing government's attitude as "embarrassing." On behalf of the Norwegian Nobel Committee and the Nobel Foundation, Reiss-Andersen wanted to participate in Liu Xiaobo's funeral, but was denied a visa by the Chinese government.

== Literary work ==
She has co-authored two crime novels with former Minister of Justice Anne Holt.

== Background ==
Her paternal grandfather was Gunnar Reiss-Andersen, who wrote lyric poetry.

== Bibliography ==
- 1997 Løvens gap (co-authored with Anne Holt)
- 2000 Uten ekko (co-authored with Anne Holt)
