= 1997 Norwegian parliamentary election =

- 15 September 1997

All 165 seats in the Storting 83 seats needed for a majority
- Registered: 3,311,190
- Turnout: 78.33% (▲2.48 pp)
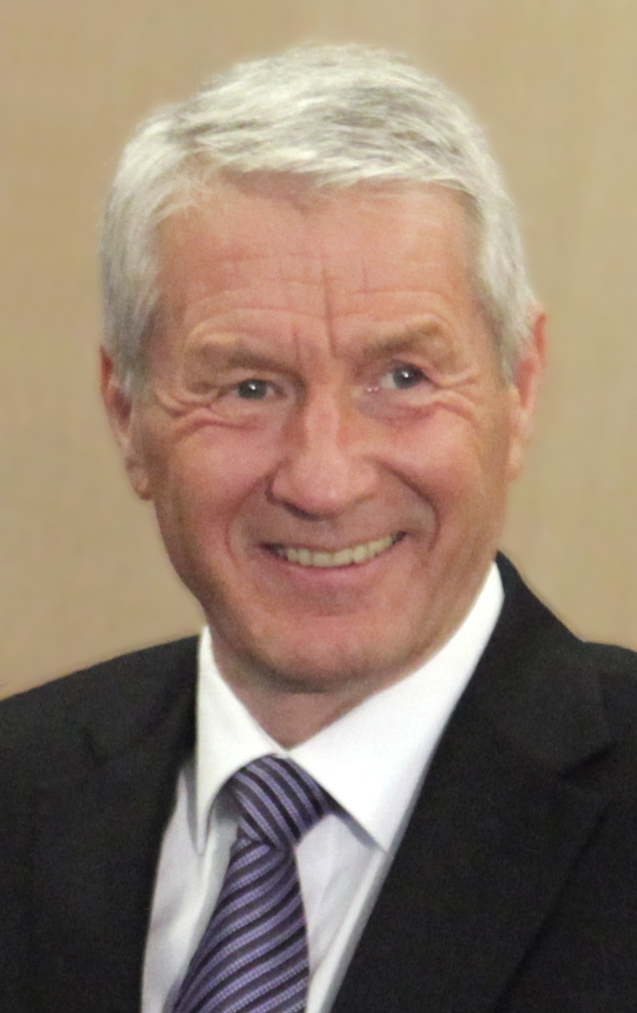

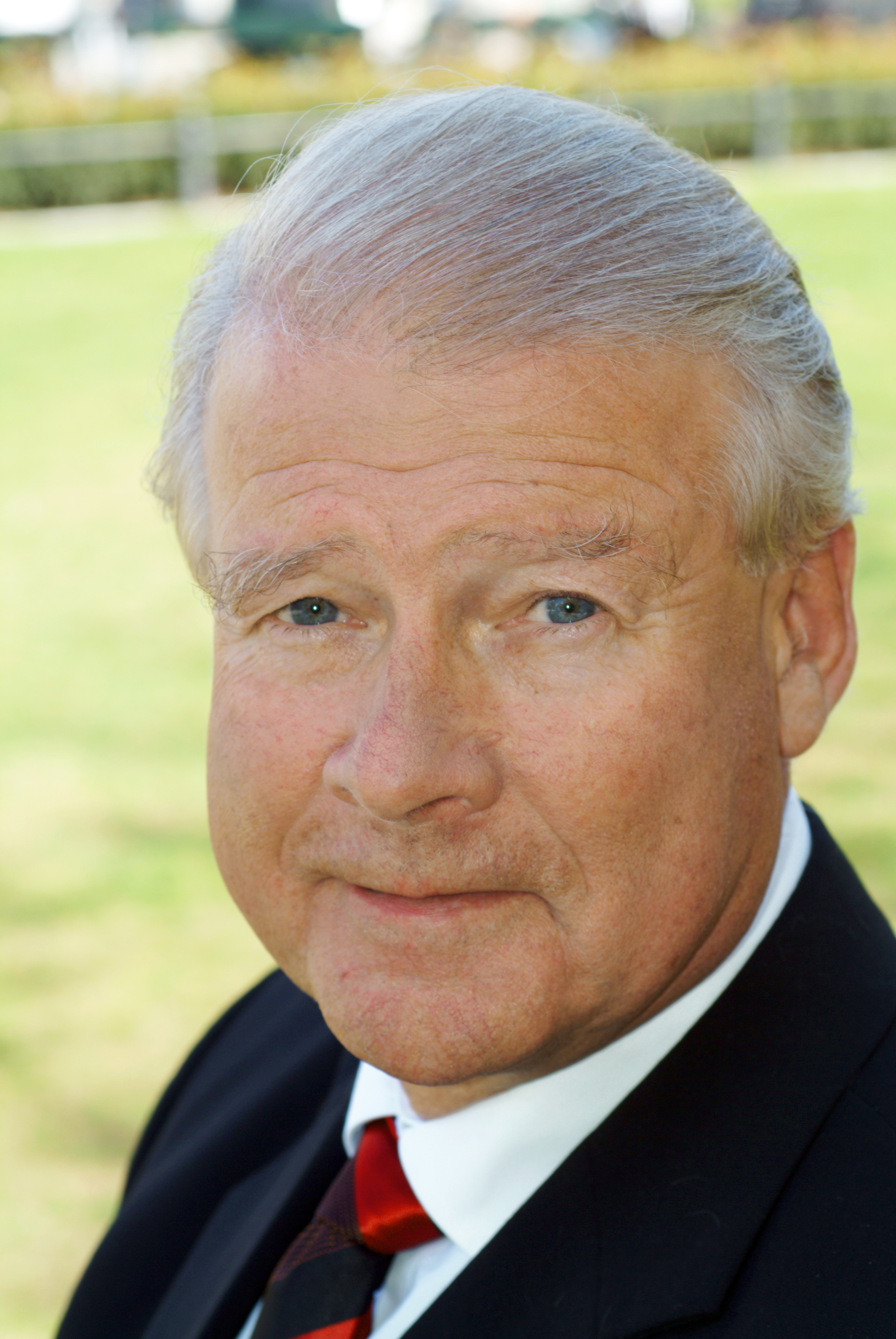

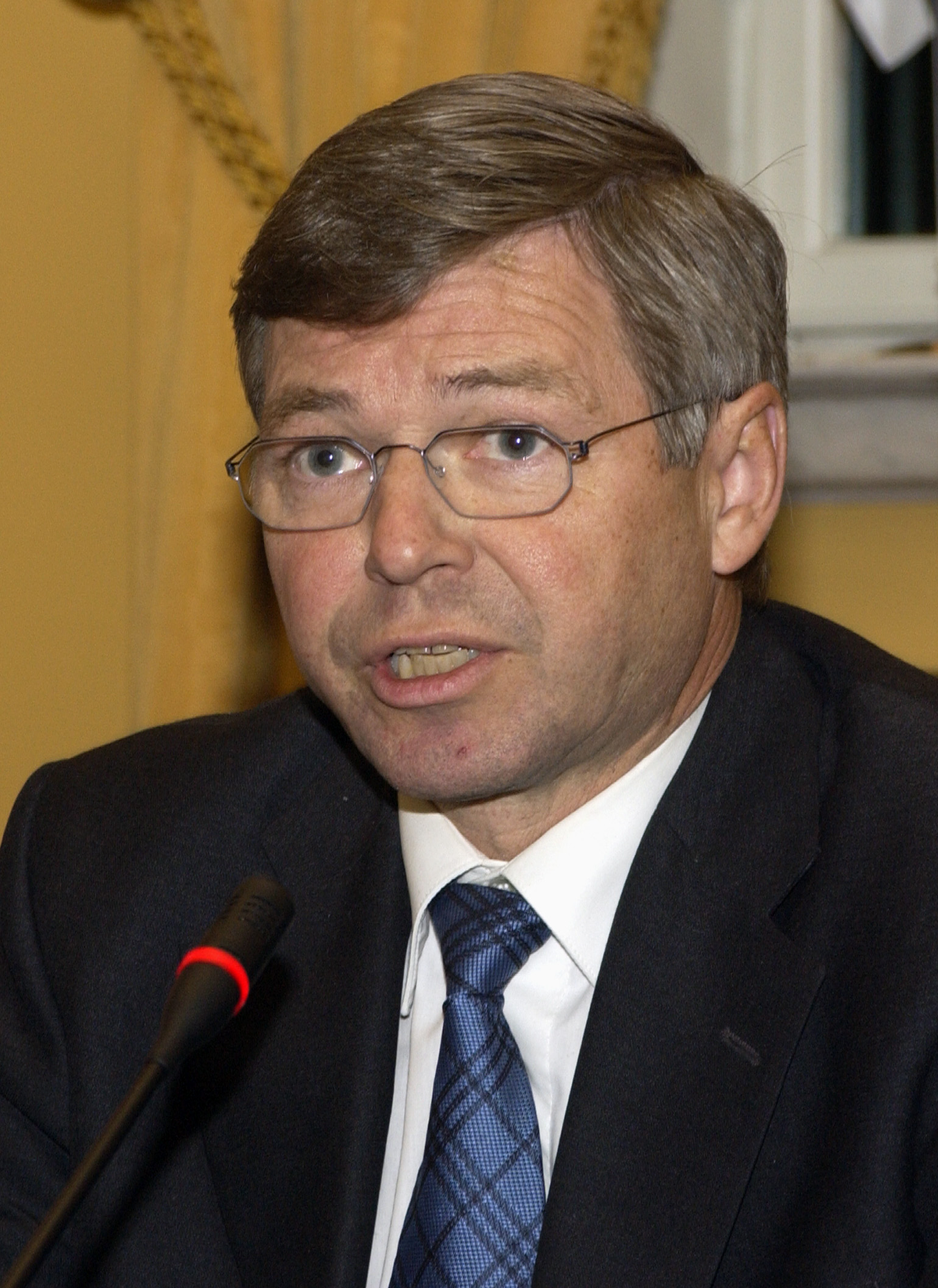

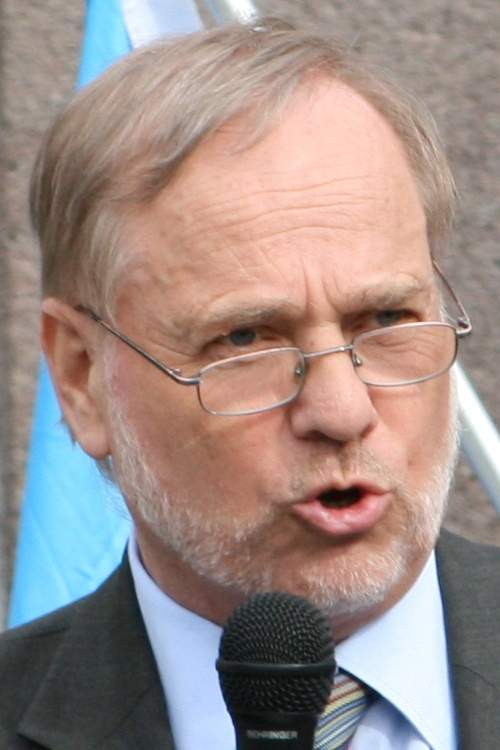

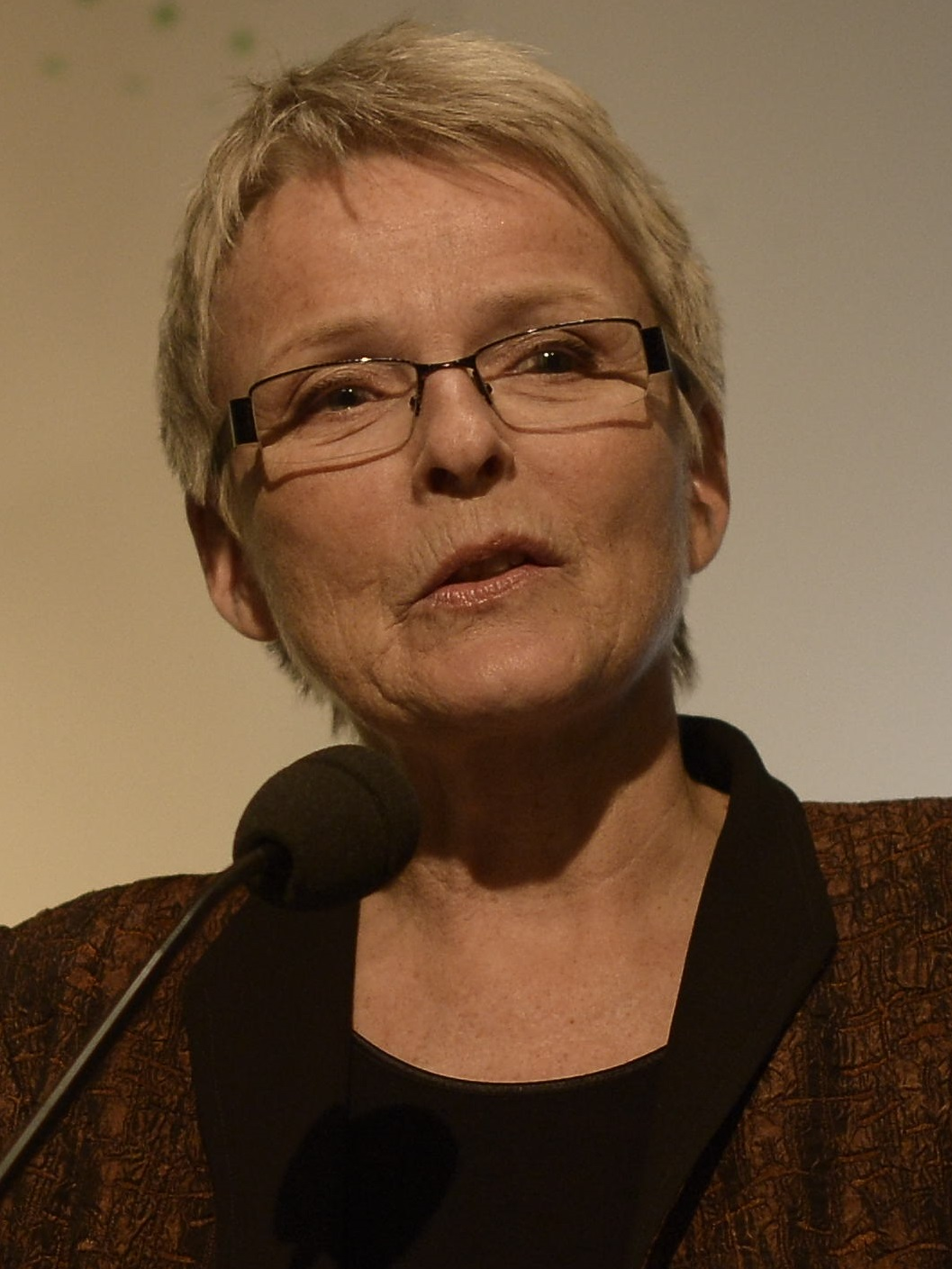

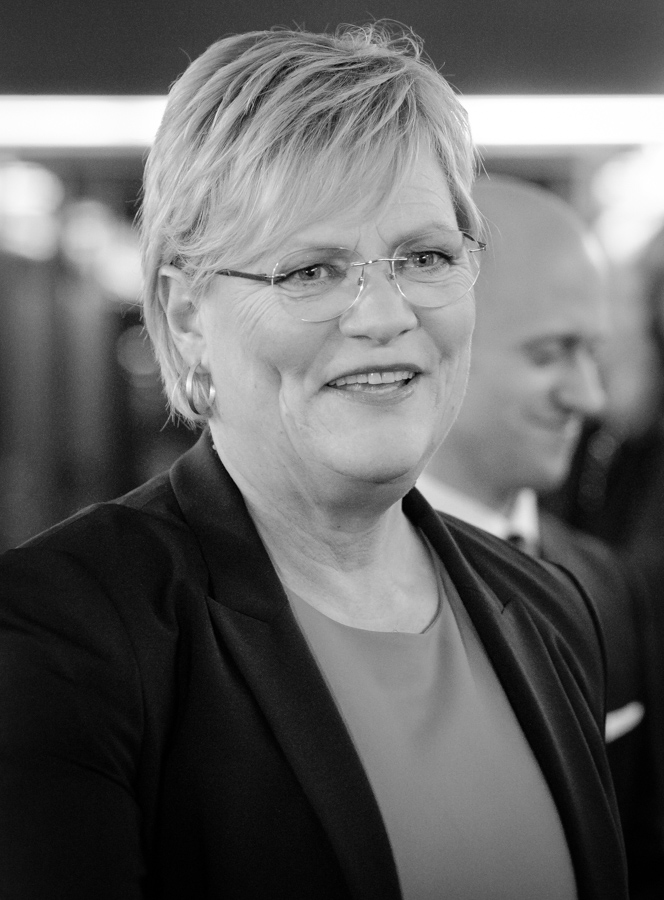

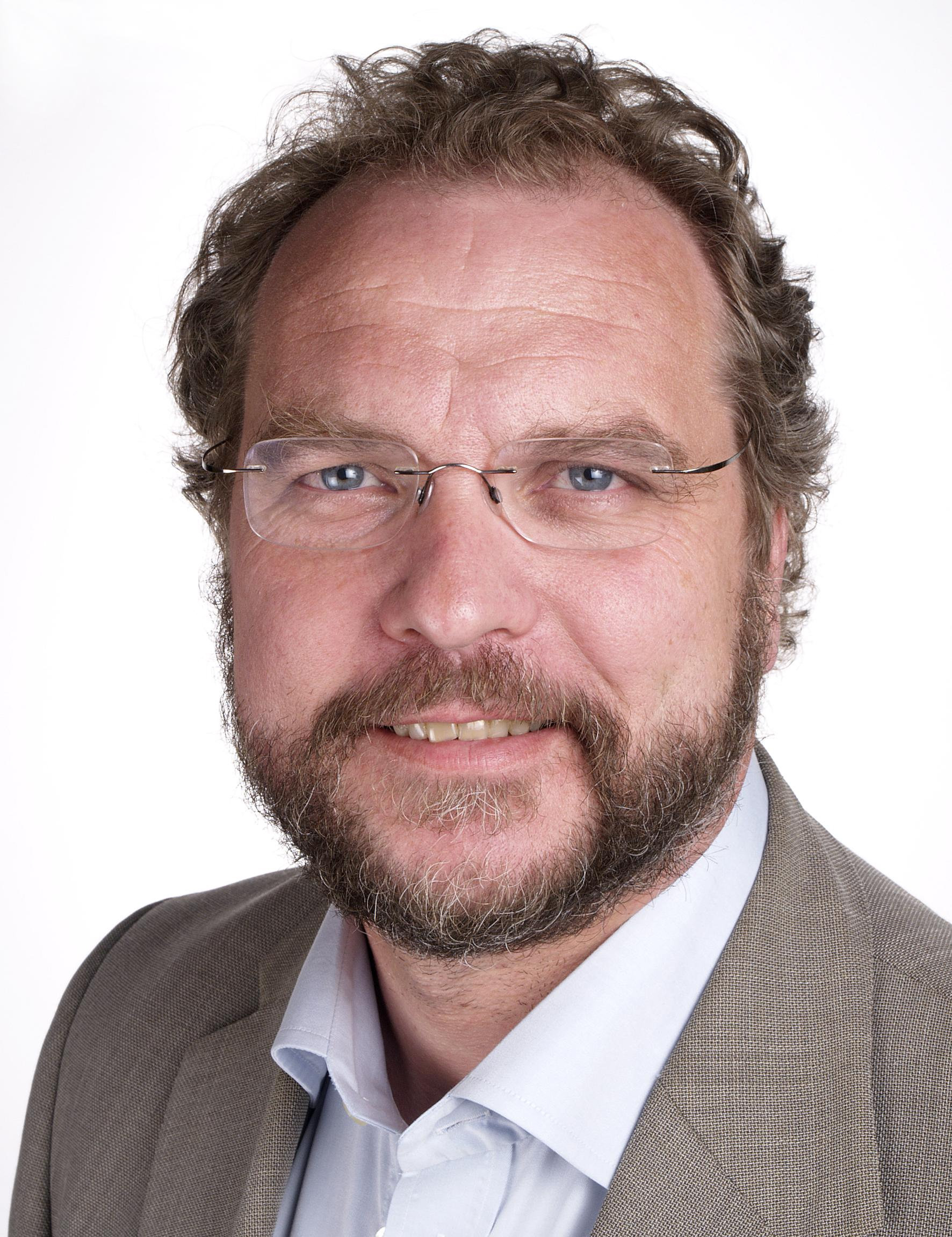
	First party	Second party	Third party
Leader	Thorbjørn Jagland	Carl I. Hagen	Kjell Magne Bondevik
Party	Labour	Progress	Christian Democratic
Last election	36.91%, 67 seats	6.28%, 10 seats	7.88%, 13 seats
Seats won	65	25	25
Seat change	▼2	▲15	▲12
Popular vote	904,362	395,376	353,082
Percentage	35.00%	15.30%	13.66%
Swing	▼1.91 pp	▲9.02 pp	▲5.78 pp
	Fourth party	Fifth party	Sixth party
Leader	Jan Petersen	Anne Enger Lahnstein	Kristin Halvorsen
Party	Conservative	Centre	Socialist Left
Last election	17.04%, 28 seats	16.74%, 32 seats	7.91%, 13 seats
Seats won	23	11	9
Seat change	▼5	▼21	▼4
Popular vote	370,441	204,824	155,307
Percentage	14.34%	7.93%	6.01%
Swing	▼2.69 pp	▼8.81 pp	▼1.90 pp
	Seventh party	Eighth party
Leader	Lars Sponheim	Steinar Bastesen
Party	Liberal	Non-Partisan
Last election	3.61%, 1 seat	0.03%, 0 seats
Seats won	6	1
Seat change	▲5	▲1
Popular vote	115,077	9,135
Percentage	4.45%	0.36%
Swing	▲0.84 pp	▲0.33 pp
- Largest bloc and seats won by constituency
Prime Minister before election
Thorbjørn Jagland
Labour
Prime Minister after election
Kjell Magne Bondevik
Christian Democratic

Parliamentary elections were held in Norway on 14 and 15 September 1997. Prior to the election Prime Minister Thorbjørn Jagland of the Labour Party had issued the 36.9 ultimatum declaring that the government would step down unless it gained 36.9% of the vote, the percentage gained by the Labour Party in 1993 under Gro Harlem Brundtland. Whilst Labour won a plurality of seats, they were unable to reach Jagland's 36.9% threshold, gaining 35% of the vote.

As a result of this, the Labour government stepped down, being replaced by a centrist coalition of the Christian People's Party, Liberal Party and the Centre Party, with Kjell Magne Bondevik being appointed Prime Minister, and confidence and supply support from the Conservative Party and the right-wing Progress Party.

== Contesting parties ==
Name		Ideology	Position	Leader	1993 result	
Name		Ideology	Position	Leader	Votes (%)	Seats
Ap	Labour Party; Arbeiderpartiet	Social democracy	Centre-left	Thorbjørn Jagland	36.9%	67 / 165
H	Conservative Party; Høyre	Liberal conservatism	Centre-right	Jan Petersen	17.0%	28 / 165
Sp	Centre Party; Senterpartiet	Agrarianism	Centre	Anne Enger Lahnstein	16.7%	32 / 165
SV	Socialist Left Party; Sosialistisk Venstreparti	Democratic socialism	Left-wing	Kristin Halvorsen	7.9%	13 / 165
KrF	Christian Democratic Party; Kristelig Folkeparti	Christian democracy	Centre to centre-right	Kjell Magne Bondevik	7.8%	13 / 165
FrP	Progress Party; Fremskrittspartiet	Conservative liberalism	Right-wing	Carl I. Hagen	6.2%	10 / 165
V	Liberal Party; Venstre	Social liberalism	Centre	Lars Sponheim	3.6%	1 / 165
R	Red Electoral Alliance; Rød Valgallianse	Communism	Far-left	Aslak Sira Myhre	1.0%	1 / 165

== Campaign ==
=== Slogans ===
Party	Original slogan	English translation
Labour Party	«Eldre og helse først!»	«Elderly and health first!»
Centre Party	«Ja til samholds-Norge, nei til forskjellsNorge»	«Yes to a united Norway, no to a Norway of difference»
Conservative Party	«Jan Petersen best som sjef/Høyre best for Norge.»	«Jan Petersen (Leader of party) best suited as boss/Conservative best suited for Norway»
Socialist Left Party		
Christian Democratic Party	«Et varmere samfunn med kristne verdier»	«A warmer society with Christian values»
Progress Party	«Frihet under ansvar. Nei til redusering av forsvaret»	«Freedom under responsibility. No to reducing the army»
Liberal Party		
Red Electoral Alliance		

=== Debates ===
1997 Norwegian general election debates
Date	Organisers	P Present I Invitee N Non-invitee								
Date	Organisers	Ap	H	Sp	Sv	KrF	Frp	V	R	Refs
12 Sep	NRK	P Thorbjørn Jagland, Hill-Marta Solberg	P Jan Petersen	P Anne Enger Lahnstein	P Kristin Halvorsen	P Valgerd Svarstad Haugland	P Carl I. Hagen	P Lars Sponheim	P Aslak Sira Myhre	

== Results ==
Party	Votes	%	Seats	+/–
Labour Party	904,362	35.00	65	–2
Progress Party	395,376	15.30	25	+15
Conservative Party	370,441	14.34	23	–5
Christian Democratic Party	353,082	13.66	25	+12
Centre Party	204,824	7.93	11	–21
Socialist Left Party	155,307	6.01	9	–4
Liberal Party	115,077	4.45	6	+5
Red Electoral Alliance	43,252	1.67	0	–1
Pensioners' Party	16,031	0.62	0	0
Non-Partisan Deputies	9,195	0.36	1	+1
Environment Party The Greens	5,884	0.23	0	0
Fatherland Party	3,805	0.15	0	0
Natural Law Party	2,207	0.09	0	0
Communist Party	1,979	0.08	0	0
Christian Conservative Party	1,386	0.05	0	0
New Future Coalition Party	491	0.02	0	0
White Electoral Alliance	463	0.02	0	New
Justice Party	281	0.01	0	New
Liberal People's Party	258	0.01	0	0
Children–Elderly	246	0.01	0	New
Society Party	214	0.01	0	0
Total	2,584,161	100.00	165	0
Valid votes	2,584,161	99.63		
Invalid/blank votes	9,508	0.37		
Total votes	2,593,669	100.00		
Registered voters/turnout	3,311,190	78.33		
Source: Nohlen & Stöver, European Elections Database

=== Voter demographics ===
Cohort	Percentage of cohort voting for							
Cohort	Ap	FrP	H	KrF	Sp	Sv	V	Others
Total vote	35.00%	15.30%	14.34%	13.66%	7.93%	6.01%	4.45%	
Gender
Females	34.8%	12.3%	12.4%	17.6%	7.9%	8.1%	4.1%	
Males	35.2%	18%	16%	10.2%	8%	4.2%	4.9%	
Age
18–30 years old	30.5%	19.4%	11.4%	11.4%	6.2%	9.8%	4.9%	
30-59 years old	35.5%	14.4%	16.5%	11.9%	7.9%	6.4%	5%	
60 years old and older	37.8%	14.6%	10.9%	20.7%	9.8%	1.1%	2.2%	
Work
low income	33.5%	17%	7%	16.4%	9.2%	6.8%	5%	
Average income	36%	16.7%	11%	15.2%	9.2%	4.7%	3.8%	
High income	35.4%	11.7%	27%	8.2%	4.2%	7.1%	5.2%	
Education
Primary school	44.7%	15.3%	5.6%	15.3%	10.6%	2.5%	1.6%	
High school	35.9%	17.2%	12.9%	13.8%	8.8%	4.8%	3.9%	
University/college	26.3%	9.9%	24.3%	12%	4.1%	11.6%	7.7%	
Source: Norwegian Institute for Social Research

=== Seat distribution ===
Constituency	Total seats	Seats won									
Constituency	Total seats	By party								By coalition	
Constituency	Total seats	Ap	FrP	KrF	H	Sp	SV	V	TVF	Borgerlig	Red-green
Akershus	14	5	2	1	3	1	1	1		8	6
Aust-Agder	4	2	1	1						2	2
Buskerud	7	4	1	1	1					3	4
Finnmark	4	2		1			1			1	3
Hedmark	9	4	1	1	1	1	1			4	5
Hordaland	16	5	2	3	2	1	1	2		10	6
Møre og Romsdal	10	3	2	2	1	1		1		7	3
Nord-Trøndelag	6	3	1	1		1				3	3
Nordland	12	5	1	2	1	1	1		1	6	6
Oppland	7	4	1	1		1				3	4
Oslo	17	6	3	1	4		2	1		9	8
Østfold	8	4	2	1	1					4	4
Rogaland	12	3	2	2	2	1	1	1		8	4
Sogn og Fjordane	5	2		1	1	1				3	2
Sør-Trøndelag	10	4	1	1	2	1	1			5	5
Telemark	6	3	1	1	1					3	3
Troms	6	2	1	1	1	1				4	2
Vest-Agder	5	1	1	2	1					4	1
Vestfold	7	3	2	1	1					4	3
Total	165	65	25	25	23	11	9	6	1	91	74
Source: Statistics Norway
