= Jan Balstad =

Norwegian labour leader and politician

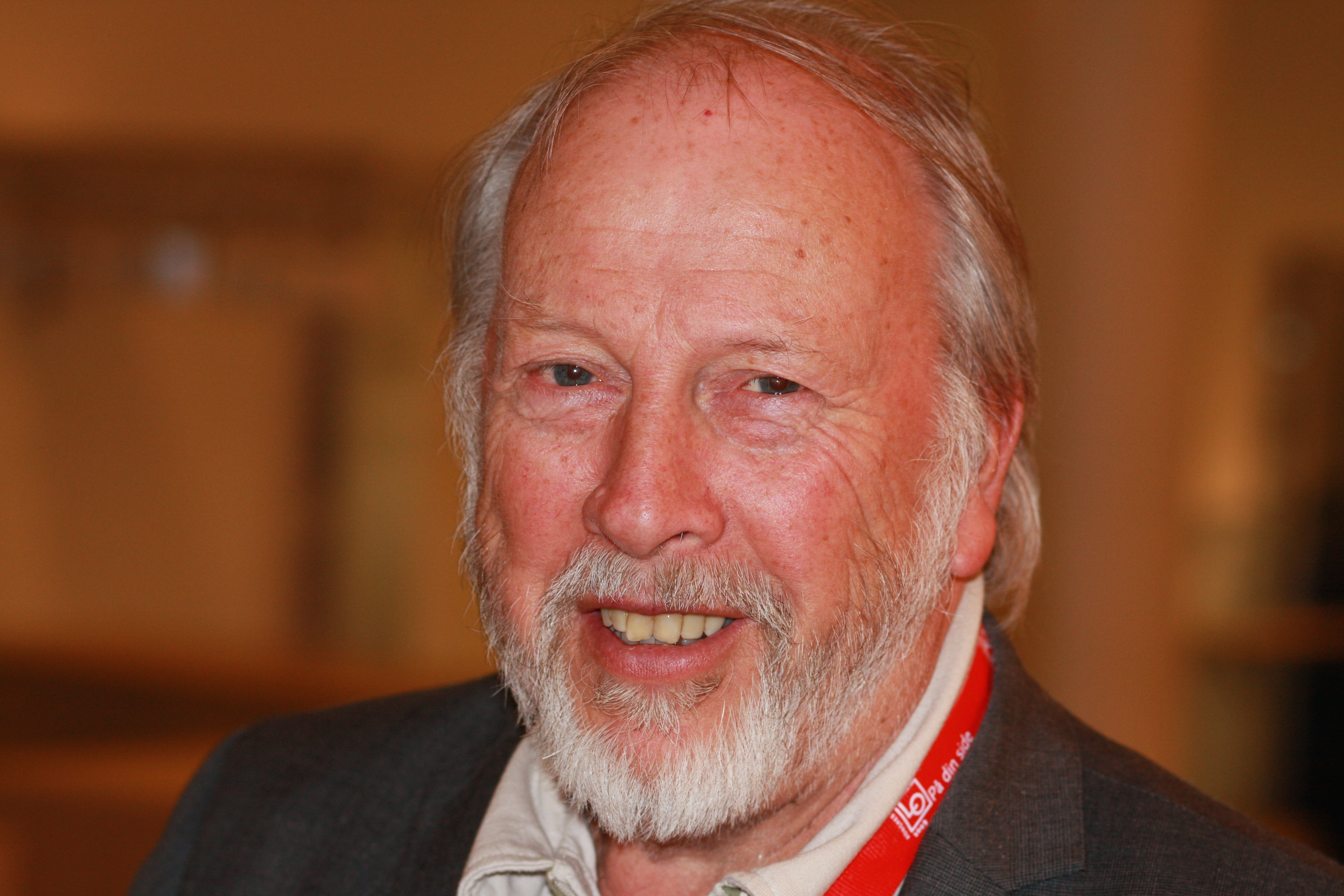
Balstad in 2009

Jan Balstad (born 16 November 1937 in Oslo) is a Norwegian labour leader for the Norwegian Confederation of Trade Unions, and a politician for the Labour Party. He was Minister of trade and shipping affairs at the Ministry of Foreign Affairs 1988–1989.
