= 36.9 ultimatum =

1997 event in Norwegian politics

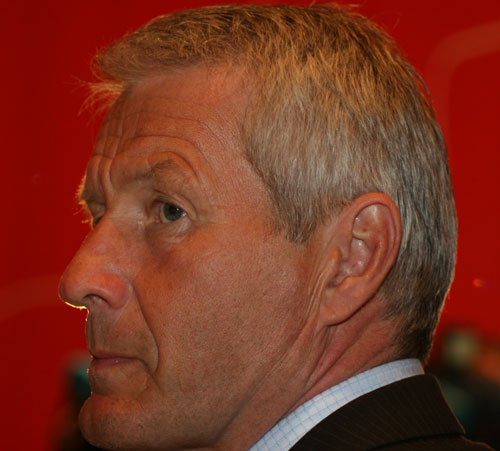
Thorbjorn Jagland 2007

The 36.9 ultimatum refers to the 1997 ultimatum by Thorbjørn Jagland, the then-Prime Minister of Norway, that his government would resign if the Labour Party gained less than 36.9% of the votes (the percentage gained by the party under Gro Harlem Brundtland in the 1993 Norwegian parliamentary election) in the 1997 Norwegian parliamentary election, no matter what the parliamentary situation would be. As the Labour Party obtained 35%, Jagland's government resigned, even though his party won the election in the sense that it remained the biggest party and could have continued in government. Jagland's 36.9 ultimatum was subject to much public ridicule in 1997 and subsequent years, as well as strong criticism within his own party. When the Labour Party formed a government again in 2000, Jens Stoltenberg became Prime Minister with Jagland as Foreign Minister; Stoltenberg also succeeded Jagland as leader of the Labour Party in 2002.
