= Frank Willy Larsen =

Norwegian politician (born 1965)

Frank Willy Larsen (born 15 September 1965 in Ringerike) is a Norwegian politician for the Labour Party.

He served as a deputy representative to the Norwegian Parliament from Buskerud during the term 1997–2001. From 2000 to 2001 he was a regular representative, covering for Thorbjørn Jagland who was appointed to the first cabinet Stoltenberg.

Larsen was a member of the executive committee of the municipal council from Ringerike Municipality from 1999 to 2001. He was later hired in administrative positions (as rådmann) in Værøy Municipality and Halden Municipality.
