= Dine Penger =

Norwegian finance magazine

- Categories: Finance magazine
- Frequency: Monthly
- Publisher: VG Media House
- Founder: Carl Johan Berg and Carsten O. Five
- Founded: 1983
- Company: Schibsted
- Country: Norway
- Based in: Oslo
- Language: Norwegian
- Website: Dine Penger

Dine Penger (Your Money in English) is a private Norwegian monthly finance magazine. The magazine is based in Oslo.

== History and profile ==
Dine Penger was established in 1983 by Carl Johan Berg and Carsten O. Five who were also editors. Later, Christian Vennerød took over editorship from Berg. Vennerød and Five bought the magazine in 1988, and sold it in 1996 to Schibsted for almost 60 million kroner. The publisher is the VG media house, a subsidiary of Schibsted. The magazine is released monthly.

Vennerød and Five returned as editors between 2000 and 2002. Since 2002, the editor has been Tom Staavi. Dine Penger had 414 000 readers in 2005 (Riksundersøkelsen, autumn 2005). Its circulation was 33,638 copies in 2013. E24, the business news website, merged with Dine Penger in 2013.

== DinePenger.no ==
In February 2006, the magazine's website moved to VG Nett.
