= Thorbjørn Jagland =

Norwegian politician (born 1950)

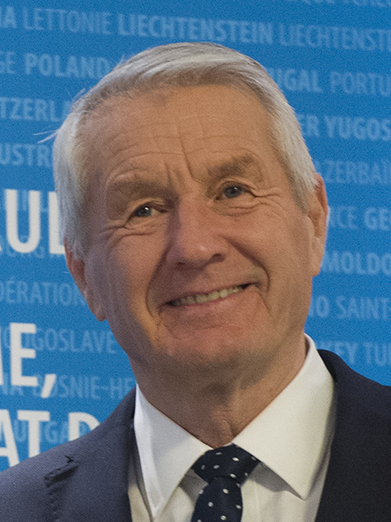
- Jagland in 2019

Secretary General of the Council of Europe
- In office 1 October 2009 – 18 September 2019
- Deputy: Gabriella Battaini-Dragoni
- Preceded by: Maud de Boer-Buquicchio (Acting)
- Succeeded by: Marija Pejčinović Burić

Prime Minister of Norway
- In office 25 October 1996 – 17 October 1997
- Monarch: Harald V
- Preceded by: Gro Harlem Brundtland
- Succeeded by: Kjell Magne Bondevik

Leader of the Labour Party
- In office 8 November 1992 – 10 November 2002
- First Deputy: Jens Stoltenberg
- Second Deputy: Hill-Marta Solberg
- Preceded by: Gro Harlem Brundtland
- Succeeded by: Jens Stoltenberg

Chair of the Norwegian Nobel Committee
- In office 1 January 2009 – 3 March 2015
- Preceded by: Ole Danbolt Mjøs
- Succeeded by: Kaci Kullmann Five

President of the Storting
- In office 10 October 2005 – 30 September 2009
- Monarch: Harald V
- Prime Minister: Kjell Magne Bondevik; Jens Stoltenberg
- Vice President: Carl I. Hagen
- Preceded by: Jørgen Kosmo
- Succeeded by: Dag Terje Andersen

Minister of Foreign Affairs
- In office 17 March 2000 – 19 October 2001
- Prime Minister: Jens Stoltenberg
- Preceded by: Knut Vollebæk
- Succeeded by: Jan Petersen

Member of the Norwegian Parliament
- In office 1 October 1993 – 30 September 2009
- Deputy: Vidar Brynsplass; Frank Willy Larsen; Martin Kolberg
- Constituency: Buskerud

Personal details
- Born: Thorbjørn Johansen; 5 November 1950 (age 76) Drammen, Buskerud, Norway
- Party: Labour
- Spouse: Hanne Grotjord (m. 1976)
- Children: 2
- Education: University of Oslo

Thorbjørn Jagland (né Johansen;; born 5 November 1950) is a Norwegian politician from the Labour Party. He served as the prime minister of Norway from 1996 to 1997, as the minister of Foreign Affairs from 2000 to 2001, as the president of the Storting from 2005 to 2009, as chairman of the Norwegian Nobel Committee from 2009 to 2015 and as secretary general of the Council of Europe from 2009 to 2019.

Jagland studied economics at the University of Oslo at introductory level, but did not graduate. He started his political career in the Workers' Youth League, which he led from 1977 to 1981. He was party secretary from 1986 to 1992 and party leader from 1992 to 2002. Jagland's cabinet, albeit short-lived, was marked by controversies, with two ministers being forced to withdraw following personal scandals. Jagland, who was much ridiculed in the media for his quotes and statements and frequently portrayed as incompetent, resigned following the 1997 election, as a consequence of his much-ridiculed 36.9 ultimatum, even though his party won the most votes. In 2010, a group of forty prominent historians ranked Jagland as the weakest Norwegian prime minister since the end of the Second World War; two years before, his predecessor Gro Harlem Brundtland had criticized his premiership in harsh terms and described Jagland as "stupid". His term as Foreign Minister was marked by controversies due to his perceived lack of qualification for the office and quotes and statements that were considered inappropriate. Jagland was widely perceived to have been passed over when Jens Stoltenberg formed his second cabinet in 2005.

In 2009, Jagland was elected as the secretary-general of the Council of Europe. In 2014 he was reelected for an additional five years. His tenure as secretary-general has been controversial, and he has been accused of inaction against corruption, and of servility towards Vladimir Putin's Russia. Jagland was a member of the Norwegian Nobel Committee, and left in 2020; he formerly served as its chairman from 2009 to 2015.

On 12 February 2026, Jagland was charged by the National Authority for Investigation and Prosecution of Economic and Environmental Crime in Norway (Økokrim) of aggravated corruption, in light of information from the Epstein files, which revealed he had maintained a close association with child sex trafficker Jeffrey Epstein. Several of his homes in Oslo, Risør and Rauland, were searched. They also announced that he would be brought in for a police interrogation. Økokrim previously announced they would investigate whether gifts, travel, and loans were received in connection with his positions as chair of the Nobel Committee and Secretary General of the Council of Europe during the period covered by the released documents. After he was charged with corruption, Norwegian media reported that Jagland had been committed to a mental hospital as a suicide candidate, with his lawyer confirming it was related to the criminal prosecution of him.

== Early life ==
Thorbjørn Jagland was born on 5 November 1950 as Thorbjørn Johansen in Drammen and is the son of a welder, Helge Th. Jagland, and a cook, Ingrid Bjerknes. According to the Norwegian daily Dagbladet, his father had additional duties as a kind of "steward" for his community, so when "the postal service had letters" or envelopes without a complete address, the mailman delivered many of them to Jagland's home, "since that was where everything happened". Jagland graduated from secondary school in 1969. Along with his twin brother Helge, Thorbjørn Jagland briefly studied economics at the University of Oslo, but was at the same time involved in politics and did not finish his studies. Jagland and his parents changed their surname from Johansen, a common surname with working class connotations, to Jagland in 1957; the Jagland name was one of the proposed "new family names" which imitated traditional farm names in the book 2000 nye slektsnavn ("2,000 new family names") by Astrid Moss; the book aimed to help members of the working class with common surnames to find more unique names.

== Political career ==
=== Early involvement, general secretary and elected party leader ===
In 1966, at age 16, he joined the Lier chapter of the Workers' Youth League (AUF). Rising up rapidly through the party ranks, he was elected leader of the Workers' Youth League in Buskerud, in 1973, a position he held until 1975. That year, he was elected member of the Buskerud county council. In 1977, he became the national leader of the Workers' Youth League, a position he held until 1981. During this period, he said he wanted to bridge the gap between the youth wing and the mother party, but also expressed the need for the Workers' Youth League to have its own political platform. Important issues he supported at that time included the nationalization of the oil industry, permission to conduct petroleum test boring outside Northern Norway, and that the state should use income from the petroleum industry to nationalise domestic industry.

From 1981, he worked as a secretary for the Labour Party; he became acting general secretary in 1986 and was formally appointed to the position in 1987. In his role as secretary of the Labour party, Jagland initiated a number of measures that culminated in organisational and political reforms. The right of the Trade Unions to influence the working of the Labour Party was curtailed; periodic consultations were initiated with civil society outside the party boundaries in the formulation of the party manifesto etc. In 1986, he also became chairman of the Labour Party's International Committee. He held both positions until 1992, when he succeeded long-time leader Gro Harlem Brundtland.

Jagland was elected to the Norwegian Parliament from Buskerud in 1993, and was re-elected on three occasions. During his first term, Jagland was a member of the Standing Committee on Foreign Affairs, and also served as the fractional leader for the parliamentary group of the party. In 1995, Jagland published a book, titled Brev (Letters), "Vår sårbare verden" (Our vulnerable World) i 2001 and "Ti teser om EU og Norge" (Ten Postulates about the EU & Norway) in 2003.

=== Premiership ===
On 23 October 1996, Gro Harlem Brundtland informed Jagland she was withdrawing from politics and leaving him as head of government. The third cabinet Brundtland resigned, prompting the party leader Jagland to form a new cabinet. Jagland's cabinet was short-lived with two ministers being forced to withdraw. He resigned following the 1997 election even though his party won the most votes. Jagland was widely perceived to have been passed over when Jens Stoltenberg formed his second cabinet in 2005.

Jagland launched his vision of the "Norwegian House" during his tenure as prime minister. In his speech to the Storting following his appointment, Jagland described the Norwegian House as a foundation with four pillars. The metaphor represented, "the collective value creation within the ecologically sustainable society". The four pillars that hold up the house were business and labour policy; welfare policy; research and educational policy; and foreign and security policy. Jagland stated that everyone had something to contribute regarding the creation of the house; in particular he stated that the cabinet would cooperate with the opposition to reach these goals. In his speech, Jagland said that he would not deviate much from Harlem Brundtland's policies, but that he would increase the focus on violence, abuse of alcohol and drugs, and crime, including improvement of preventative measures and the courts. He also stated that it was important to introduce information technology in all parts of the education system. As part of the construction of the Norwegian House, the cabinet also started to appoint lay councils, with expertise within their fields, that would provide them with feedback and inputs on important areas in society. Jagland stated that the purpose was to allow critical voices close access to the political decisions, and increase the number of ideas generated at a political level.

Jagland stated in August 2008 that "the Norwegian House could have been better planned and prepared, but I did not have the time. I took a chance. The Labour Party was down for the count. My goal was to make a good election; and we did. We have not done so well since". Jagland said in an interview, "I still get letters from people who miss the Norwegian House. It was an attempt at something new, a building project that would also inspire the activity on the side of the parties".

==== Jagland's 36.9 ultimatum and resignation ====
Ahead of the 1997 parliamentary election, Jagland announced the cabinet would resign if the Labour Party received less than 36.9% of the popular vote. This was the percentage of the vote that the party had received in the 1993 election while Brundtland was still leading, which had provided them with an unclear mandate to govern.

The Constitution of Norway does not require a cabinet to be formally approved by Parliament in order to serve, and a minority government that lacks concrete support from its inception may serve as long as it does not receive a vote of no confidence. The Labour cabinet was only directly supported by its own party group, which consisted of 67 out of 165 members of Parliament. To pass legislation, the cabinet had sought support from the largest opposition parties—the Centre Party as well as Labour's traditional adversary, the Conservative Party—on a case-by-case basis. Brundtland had already employed this ad-hoc tactic during her time as prime minister, describing it as "slalom racing in the Storting". However, the negotiations in order to land the annual state budget in 1996 were particularly tough. According to political scientist Trond Nordby, Jagland felt that a cabinet which achieved less than 36.9% would struggle to govern.

As it turned out, Labour only received 35.0%, remaining the largest party with a small loss of seats. Jagland resigned on 29 September 1997 and power was given to the first cabinet of Kjell Magne Bondevik. This cabinet had an even weaker parliamentary basis. Erik Solheim, the leader of Socialist Left Party (SV), said that if Jagland resigned, "he would go down in history as Norway's most puzzling politician".

=== Minister of Foreign Affairs ===
In February 2000, still reeling from the 36.9 fiasco and the growing popularity of deputy party leader Stoltenberg, Jagland withdraw as a prime minister candidate. Speaking to the national council of Labour on 10 February 2000, Jagland said "If I were to continue as prime minister candidate, and especially if I should return as prime minister, the pressure that has been put against me the last three years will only continue and increase in strength." Only 35 days later, the first cabinet of Bondevik resigned following a motion of confidence. A new Labour cabinet, to be led by Jens Stoltenberg, was announced by King Harald V on 17 March 2000.

Jagland was chosen for Minister of Foreign Affairs. One of his first acts as Minister of Foreign Affairs was to visit Belgrade, three years before its collapse. Jagland wanted to improve foreign aid to Yugoslavia and try to find a peaceful solution to the Yugoslav wars. Jagland engineered financial and material support to the forces in Yugoslavia who were opposed to Slobodan Milosevic, a move that increased the popularity of the opposition to Milosevic and his eventual fall from power. The Norwegian Ministry of Foreign Affairs furnished computers that helped in revealing the electoral fraud perpetrated by Milosevic. The Norwegian contribution was instrumental in the overthrow of the Milosevic government and Jagland was the first to be invited to the victory celebrations. Jagland again made national headlines in a similar fashion to the publicity about "The Norwegian House" and "36.9%", this time for the phrase "Bongo from Congo", which Jagland used when referring to Omar Bongo, the president of Gabon, when he was visiting Norway. Jagland stated on 2 February 2001 on the nationally broadcast television show I kveld med Per Ståle on TV 2 that "everybody at the Ministry of Foreign Affairs went around saying that 'now you are going to meet with Bongo from Congo'". The term "Bongo" and "Congo" has been seen by many as a racial slur.

Jagland visited Sri Lanka in June 2001 to try to reach a level of involvement in the Sri Lankan Civil War. After a brief visit to the capital Colombo, at the request of the Sri Lankan president Chandrika Kumaratunga, Jagland agreed to take a role in the peace process of Sri Lanka between the Sri Lankan Government and the Tamil Tigers.[29] The Labour Party did not fare well during the 2001 election. In an interview with the Associated Press, Jagland said, "It is unstable and unpredictable". After the votes had been counted, Stoltenberg and his cabinet was forced to resign, suffering from its worst election campaign results since 1924.

Jagland stepped down in 2001 from his post as Foreign Minister in the wake of the collapse of the Stoltenberg government. The leadership battle of the party didn't end with the election, and pressure was still mounting on Jagland to give the party leader role to Stoltenberg. It was expected that Stoltenberg would contest the leader during the national congress of Labour in November 2002, and in January 2002 the two were supposed to say if they wanted role. On 15 January, Jagland collapsed in the parliament and was sent to the hospital. Later that evening, during live coverage by TV 2 Nyhetene, comedian Bård Tufte Johansen interrupted the live broadcast jumping around in a chicken costume, cackling about media's treatment of Thorbjørn Jagland and mocking the media's double standards. On 3 February 2002, Jagland announced that he wouldn't seek a new term as party leader in November.

=== President of the Storting ===
In 2005, Jagland was reelected to a fourth term in the Norwegian Parliament. Jørgen Kosmo, the previous President of the Storting, had not stood for parliamentary re-election, and Jagland was elected to this position by the members of parliament on 10 October 2005. Jagland was elected with only one blank vote, whereas his Progress Party opponent, Carl I. Hagen, had 25 blank votes in the Storting. He later said: "This is a completely new era for me. I shall lead the work of the parliament, so that it goes smoothly on rails. Also, I represent the Parliament, both in Norway and abroad."

Jagland told the newspaper Aftenposten he wanted more Norwegian soldiers sent to South Afghanistan: "The Norwegian special forces will certainly be welcome throughout the winter. If NATO is demanding them, Norway should contribute". In 2007, Stoltenberg allowed Jagland to push through his plan to develop Storting as a stronger centre for current political debates, thus increasing the power of the parliamentary members on issues from the cabinet.

A UN conference against racism and discrimination in Geneva was planned for the spring of 2009. Some member states, such as Canada and Israel, had announced that they might boycott the conference because previous such conferences had given way to anti-Semitism and racism. Jagland said Norway was unlikely to undertake any boycott, but he added, "The previous racism conference in Durban, South Africa, in 2001, was a festival in the criticism of Western values. We must never allow the successor conference in Geneva in April next year to be a repetition of this".

In 2009, the cabinet issued a proposal to remove the "Blasphemy Paragraph", part of the criminal law that made blasphemous statements a criminal offense. There was a political consensus in parliament that the paragraph was outdated. The cabinet proposed that it instead by replaced by a "Racism Paragraph", that was aimed at protecting religious groups from attacks, while retaining protection of the academic freedom of speech. All political parties in parliament, except the Centre Party, were opposed to the "Racism Paragraph", but Centre-leader Liv Signe Navarsete stated that she had used her influence to make the Labour Party accept the matter. When asked about the case, Jagland responded: "It will in itself be a paradox if one questions the principle that freedom of speech is subject to the party whip. Especially when it emerges that the question may have been the subject of horse-trading and attempts at a coup".

Jagland had also been critical of the lack of parliamentary control permitted by the coalition cabinet. Critics accused Jagland of attacking the Red-Green Cabinet as revenge against Stoltenberg for forcing Jagland to resign as Labour Party leader in 2002. Jagland rejected this as "petty criticism". Jagland announced in September 2008 that he would not seek reelection. He said he decided, with "great sadness", to leave Norwegian politics because he was applying for the position of Secretary-General of the Council of Europe.

== Nobel Committee ==
Jagland with president Barack Obama during the 2009 Nobel Peace Prize ceremony

On 1 January 2009, he succeeded Ole Danbolt Mjøs as the chairman of the Norwegian Nobel Committee. The Norwegian Nobel Committee is tasked with selecting candidates for award of the annual Nobel Prize for Peace in accordance with the last will and testament of Alfred Bernhard Nobel (1833–1896), the Swedish chemist and inventor of dynamite.

The Norwegian Parliament selects a committee consisting of 5 persons who then choose the candidates for the prize. This committee is completely independent of the Norwegian Parliament or other institutions, domestic or foreign. The Nobel Committee announces the winning candidate(s) on the first Friday of each October; prizes themselves are handed out on 10 December in Oslo, that date being the birthday of Alfred Nobel. The announcement of Barack Obama as winner of the 2009 Nobel Peace Prize raised a few eyebrows and Jagland had to clarify this choice on several occasions. The Nobel Committee points to the fact that it has to execute the will of Alfred Nobel, in accordance with the following text in his will:

The whole of my remaining realizable estate shall be dealt with in the following way...the capital, invested in safe securities by my executors, shall constitute a fund, the interest on which shall be annually distributed in the form of prizes to those who, during the preceding year, shall have conferred the greatest benefit to mankind... and one part to the person who shall have done the most or the best work for fraternity between nations, for the abolition or reduction of standing armies and for the holding and promotion of peace congresses....The prizes for physics and chemistry shall be awarded by the Swedish Academy of Sciences; that for physiological or medical work by the Caroline Institute in Stockholm; that for literature by the Academy in Stockholm, and that for champions of peace by a committee of five persons to be elected by the Norwegian Storting. It is my express wish that in awarding the prizes no consideration whatever shall be given to the nationality of the candidates, but that the most worthy shall receive the prize, whether he be a Scandinavian or not...

The justification for award to Obama was anchored in the work he had done to restart the START agreements with Russia and for promotion of dialogue with the Muslim world. The Nobel Peace Prize for 2012 was awarded to the European Union for having "contributed to the advancement of peace and reconciliation, democracy and human rights in Europe." The Nobel Peace Prize for 2013 was awarded to the Organisation for the Prohibition of Chemical Weapons (OPCW) for "...its extensive efforts to eliminate chemical weapons". The Nobel Peace Prize for 2014 was shared between Pakistani national Malala Yousafzai and Indian activist Kailash Satyarthi. The prize motivation states: "for their struggle against the suppression of children and young people and for the right of all children to education".

On 3 March 2015, Jagland was demoted by the five-person Norwegian Nobel Committee, which elected Kaci Kullmann Five as its new chair. Jagland's demotion is without precedent in the history of the Nobel Peace Prize. After the demotion, Jagland continued to serve as an ordinary member of the committee. In 2019, the leader of the committee asked each of the members if any of them had been in contact with Jeffrey Epstein; in 2020, Jagland changed his answer; Jeffrey Epstein and Bill Gates had a meeting with Jagland at his residence in Strasbourg in 2013, according to media in October 2020. Epstein also wrote to Jagland suggesting that Jagland should arrange a meeting between Epstein and Russian foreign minister Sergey Lavrov so that Epstein could provide "insight" about Donald Trump. Epstein told associates that Jagland was "not bright", but emphasized his formal positions as useful.

== Secretary General of the Council of Europe ==
=== First term, from 2009 to 2014 ===
In 2009, Jagland was elected Secretary General of the Council of Europe. Jagland was elected with 165 against 80 votes in the Parliamentary Assembly. The other candidate was former prime minister of Poland Włodzimierz Cimoszewicz. Jagland has emphasized the importance of strengthening the cooperation with the European Union and regular consultations are taking place with the leaders of the EU. The process of EU accession to the European Convention was meant to be ratified by 2015, but as of July 2017, no new accession agreement had been drafted.

Jagland signed an intention agreement with Commissioner Stefan Füle in April 2014, which will considerably increase the number of Joint Programmes and EU financing of projects implemented by the Council of Europe. Jagland has also taken the initiative to a Neighbourhood Policy which includes an important number of cooperation activities on the basis of Council of Europe standards with Jordan, Tunisia, Morocco and Kazakhstan. Jagland's has initiated regular consultations with the United Nations and these have since become institutionalised within the Council of Europe. In 2012, Jagland launched the World Forum for Democracy conferences at the Council of Europe. The annual conference brings together statesmen, NGOs, grassroots workers, academics, politicians and others and was inaugurated in 2012 by the Secretary General of the United Nations Ban ki Moon. In April 2014, under Jagland's watch, the Council of Europe released its seminal report "State of Democracy, Human Rights and the Rule of Law in Europe". The report constituted the first consolidated analysis of human rights, democracy and the rule of law in Europe, based on the findings of the Council of Europe's monitoring bodies. In the preface to the report, Jagland wrote:

Human rights, democracy and the rule of law in Europe now face a crisis unprecedented since the end of the Cold War. Serious violations – including corruption, immunity from prosecution, impunity, human trafficking, racism, hate speech and discrimination – are on the rise throughout the continent. People's rights are also threatened by the impact of the economic crisis and growing inequalities. The Council of Europe and its member States must act urgently to stop this erosion of fundamental rights...

=== Second term, from 2014 to 2019 ===
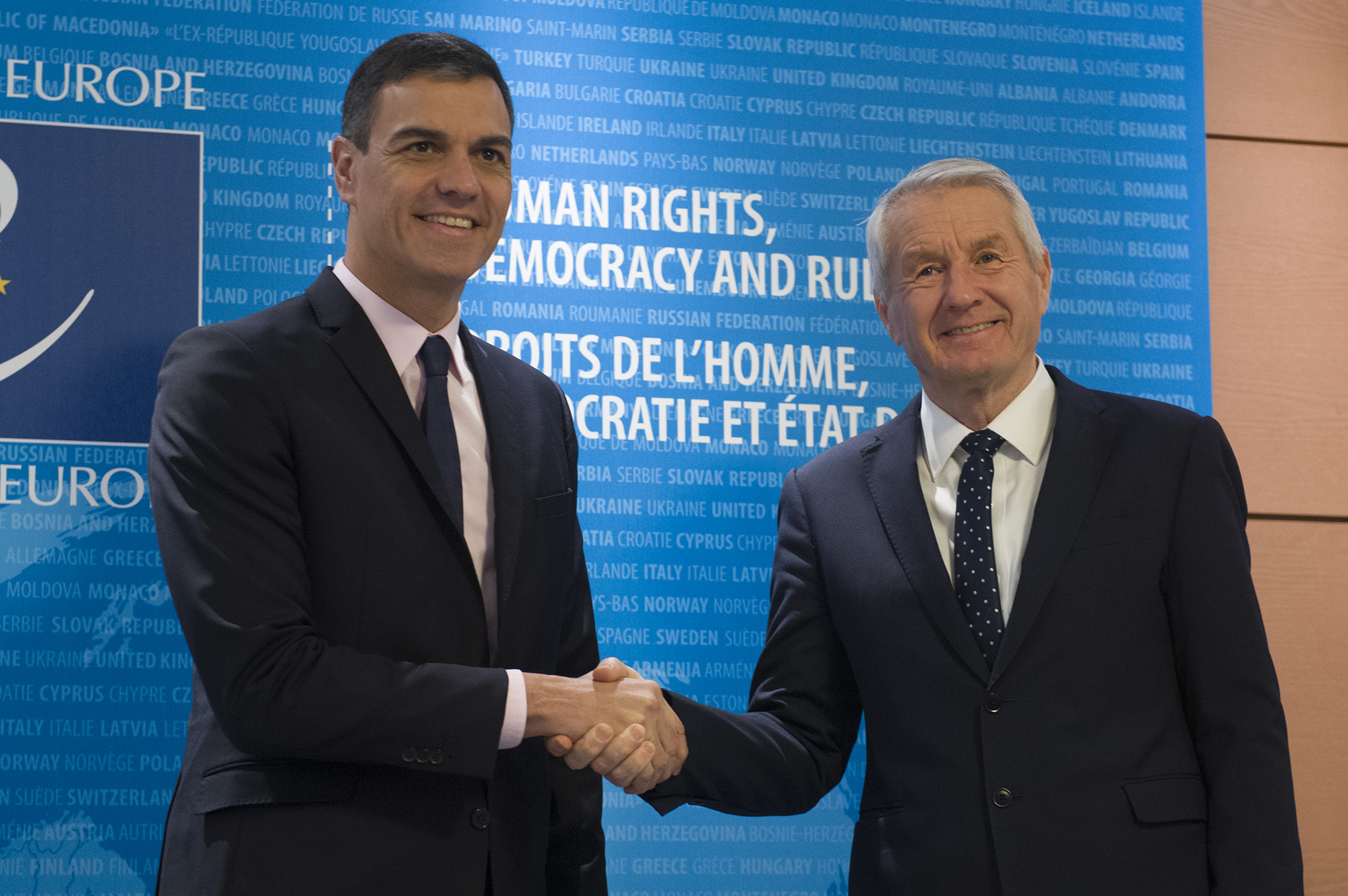
Jagland meets with Spanish Prime Minister Pedro Sánchez in Strasbourg, 7 February 2019

On 24 June 2014, the Parliamentary Assembly of the Council of Europe convened to elect the Secretary General for the term running from 2014 to 2019. Thorbjørn Jagland had expressed his intentions of continuing on for a second term and was one of the two candidates competing for the post. Jagland was opposed by Ms Sabine Leutheusser-Schnarrenberger.

In the voting conducted by the Parliamentary Assembly of the Council of Europe (PACE), of the 252 members voting, Jagland won 156. Ms Leutheusser-Schnarrenberger obtained 93. There were 3 blank ballots. With the requirement for an absolute majority being 125, Jagland's tally of 156 gave him a comfortable absolute majority. Jagland formally commenced his next term from 1 October 2014.

Jagland's re-election as Secretary General of the Council of Europe is without precedent. Several outgoing Secretaries General had stood for re-election without having been successful. His wide margin of victory is seen as a sign of approval and appreciation of his yeoman services to both the Council of Europe and his unstinting efforts to reduce tensions in Ukraine.

Jagland was continually accused by Norwegian and foreign media of servility towards Putin's Russia during his tenure. Russia was placed under voting sanctions following the annexation of Crimea in 2014, but in 2019 Jagland spearheaded the effort to give the Russians their voting rights back. Council members and analysts have criticized Jagland for giving in to Russian "blackmail". As of June 2019, seven delegations left the council in protest of the decision to give Russia voting rights without ending the occupation of parts of Ukraine.

== Other positions ==
Jagland was vice-president of the Socialist International, and was also Chair of the Organisation's Board when Willy Brandt was president. Jagland also chaired its Middle East Committee for 10 years. Furthermore, Jagland was one of five members of the Mitchell Committee appointed by President Clinton and Secretary-General Kofi Annan to advise on how to end violence in the Middle East. Jagland is an Honorary Board member of the Peres Center for Peace and was chair of the Board of the Oslo Centre for Peace and Human Rights but left when he became Chair of the Norwegian Nobel Committee. A survey in 2000 found that Jagland was second most influential in a list of the 50 most influential persons in Norway.

Jagland has been member of the international board of governors at the Peres Center for Peace since 1997. He served as one of several vice presidents of the Socialist International from 1999 to 2008. From 2000 to 2006, he chaired the Socialist International Committee on the Middle East. He became chairman of the board of the Oslo Centre upon its establishment in 2006 but left in 2009 when he became chairman of the Norwegian Nobel committee.

== Jeffrey Epstein ties and corruption investigation ==
In February 2026, Norwegian police opened a criminal investigation of Jagland for aggravated corruption related to his ties to Jeffrey Epstein. In response, Norway's foreign minister, Espen Barth Eide, announced that the Støre cabinet would apply to revoke Jagland's immunity for any acts carried out as secretary-general of the Council of Europe, stating that his immunity could not be allowed to stand in the way of the investigation. On 11 February 2026, the Council of Europe's Committee of Ministers waived the immunity.

On 12 February 2026, Jagland was charged with aggravated corruption in connection with the probe. Three of Jagland's properties were searched by Norwegian crime unit Økokrim. Jagland has denied any criminal wrongdoing and stated that he welcomes the investigation to fully clarify the allegations. Jagland's legal defense has strongly criticized the indictment, arguing that the charges are so extraordinarily vague and unbounded that they violate his fundamental human rights. They contend that the lack of concrete accusations deprives him of the right to predictability, protection against arbitrary interference, and a precise basis for his legal defense.

=== Hospitalization ===
On 24 February 2026 it was reported that Jagland had been hospitalized a week earlier due to his health situation as a result of the pressure he experienced from the probe and media pressure. A letter from Jagland's lawyer Anders Brosveet stated that the burden on Jagland, and his immediate family, has been challenging, to such an extent that there is a serious danger to life or health. Initial reports of the event framed it as a suicide attempt, which was strongly denied by Jagland's lawyer in a press release. He described the publication as "one of the worst ethical breaches" he has ever experienced. He clarified that while Jagland is hospitalized due to a medical risk, there was a misunderstanding during his conversation with a journalist.

The editor of iNyheter, Helge Lurås responsible for the initial report claimed their reporting was based on information provided to their journalist by Jagland's lawyer, and that he later changed his position. The lawyer later apologized for his comments. As a result of the incident, there was broad public debate in Norway regarding the pressure placed on individuals by press coverage and what information should be made public.

== Political views ==
Through his career in politics, Jagland was more to the left of his party. He supported more of a traditional social-democratic government, and was skeptical of policies such as privatization of state-owned companies. Jagland is in favour of Norwegian membership of the European Union. In 1990, he published the book Min europeiske drøm (My European Dream). He proposed the European Union be awarded the Nobel Peace Prize, and it was by Jagland himself in 2012. Since 1999, he has stated that the left in Norway does not use the Socialist International enough. He has outspokenly opposed the perceived presence of Islamophobia in Western societies. He has also called fighting Islamic extremism an "unnecessary fight", "that would only lead to confrontation", and insisted that no Islamic extremism exists in Norway.

== Personal life ==
Jagland married journalist Hanne Grotjord in 1976. The couple has two sons, Anders (born 1978) and Henrik (born 1986).

Jagland was awarded the title of Commander of the National Order of the Legion of Honour of France in 2013 for his "tireless commitment to the European continent and the universal values it represents".

== Bibliography ==
- Du skal eie det selv ["You Yourself Must Own It"] – 2020, autobiography. ISBN 9788202413002

Party political offices
Preceded by Sissel Rønbeck	Leader of Workers' Youth League; 1977–1981	Succeeded by Egil Knudsen
Preceded by Ivar Leveraas	Secretary of the Labour Party; 1986–1992	Succeeded by Dag Terje Andersen
Preceded by Gro Harlem Brundtland	Leader of the Labour Party; 1992–2002	Succeeded by Jens Stoltenberg
Political offices
Preceded by Gro Harlem Brundtland	Prime Minister of Norway; 1996–1997	Succeeded by Kjell Magne Bondevik
Preceded by Knut Vollebæk	Minister of Foreign Affairs; 2000–2001	Succeeded by Jan Petersen
Preceded by Jørgen Kosmo	President of the Storting; 2005–2009	Succeeded by Dag Terje Andersen
Academic offices
Preceded by Ole Danbolt Mjøs	Chair of the Norwegian Nobel Committee; 2009–2015	Succeeded by Kaci Kullmann Five
Diplomatic posts
Preceded by Maud de Boer-Buquicchio; Acting	Secretary General of the Council of Europe; 2009–2019	Succeeded by Marija Pejčinović Burić
