= Harald Berntsen =

Norwegian historian

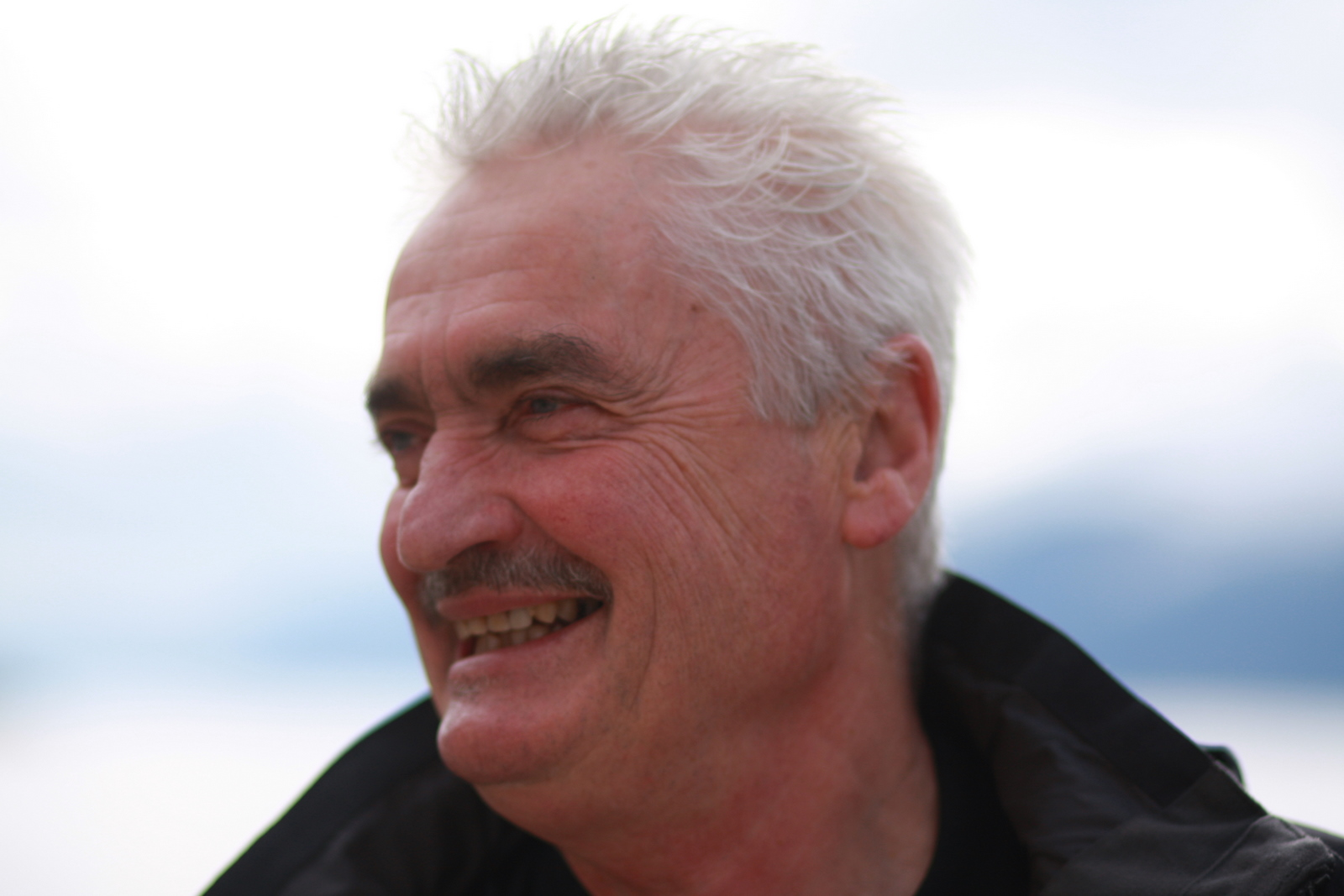
Harald Berntsen.

Harald Berntsen (born 25 January 1945 in Eidanger) is a national historian who is active in the radical left in Norway.

When the Socialist Youth Association was founded as the Socialist People's Party's youth organization in 1963, Berntsen was active. He took part in the national meeting in 1963, and was on the editorial board of Socialist Youth Association's magazine Ungsosialisten the following year.
