= Communist Workers League (Norway) =

Communist group in Norway

Communist Workers League (Norwegian: Kommunistisk Arbeiderforbund), was a small communist group in Norway. It was formed in 1972 by a group of Communist Party of Norway militants, who had either been expelled or left voluntarily. First KA oriented itself towards China, and later towards Albania.

KA published Den Røde Arbeideren (The Red Worker) annually in connection with May Day until 2005.

During the 1970s KA published Røde Fane (Red Flag).

In the spring of 2006 the group announced that it had dissolved itself.
