= 2001 Norwegian parliamentary election =

- 9–10 September 2001

All 165 seats in the Storting 83 seats needed for a majority
- Registered: 3,359,433
- Turnout: 75.54% (▼2.79 pp)
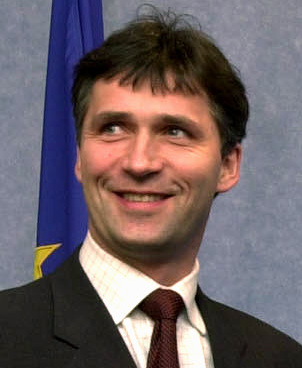

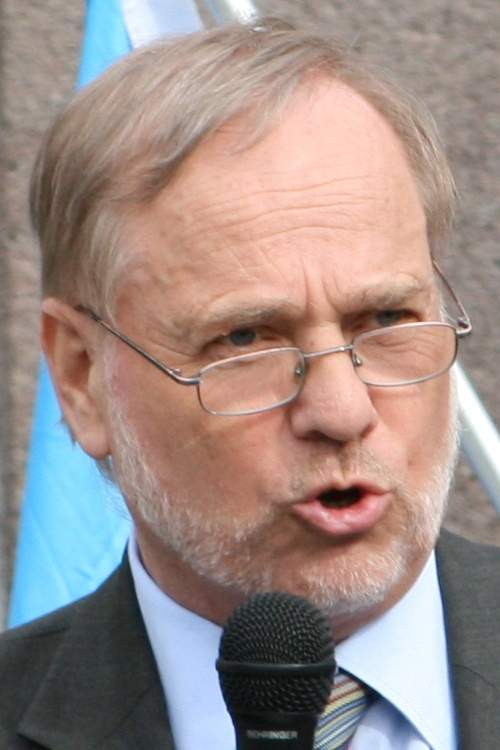

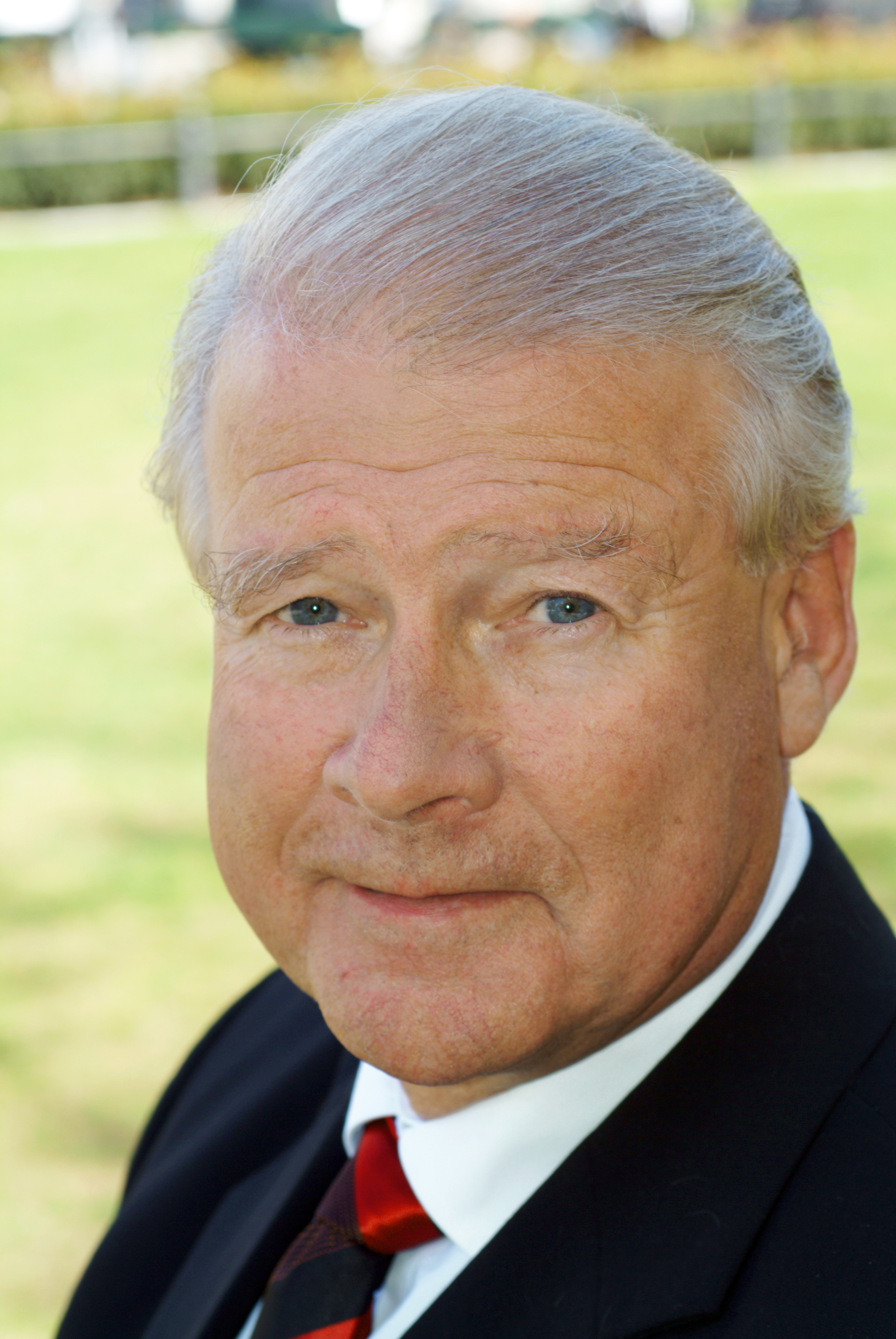

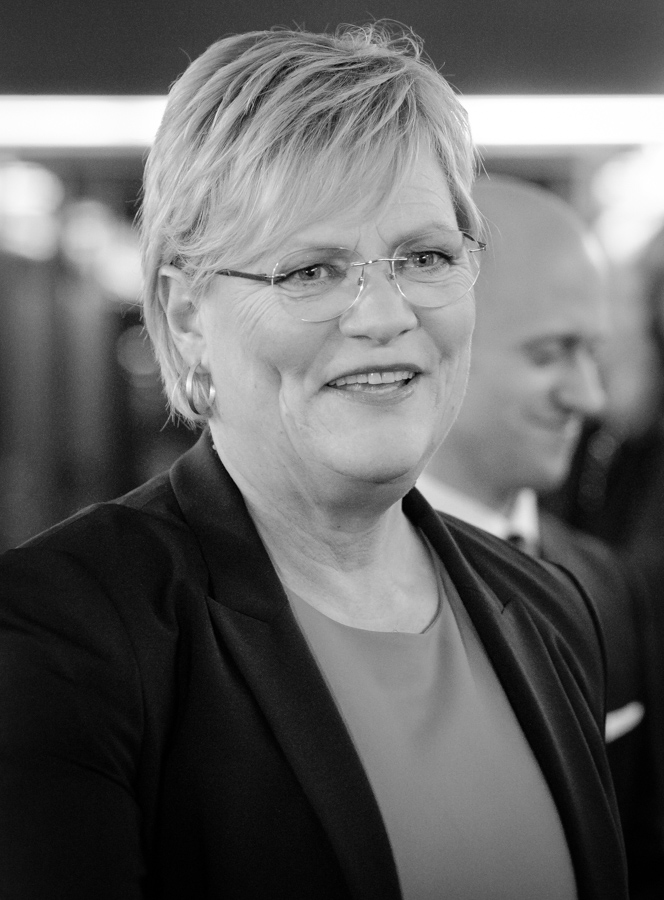

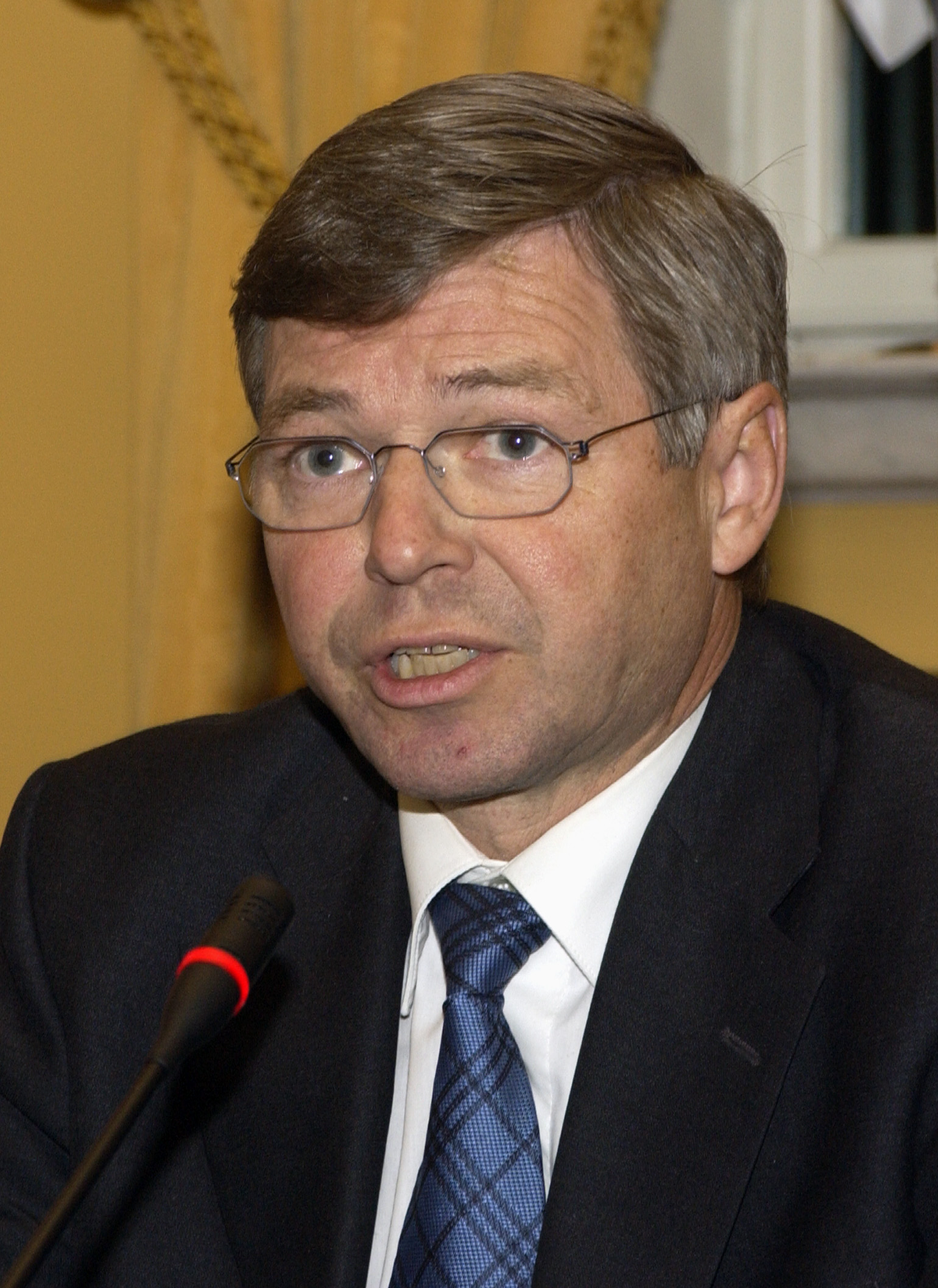

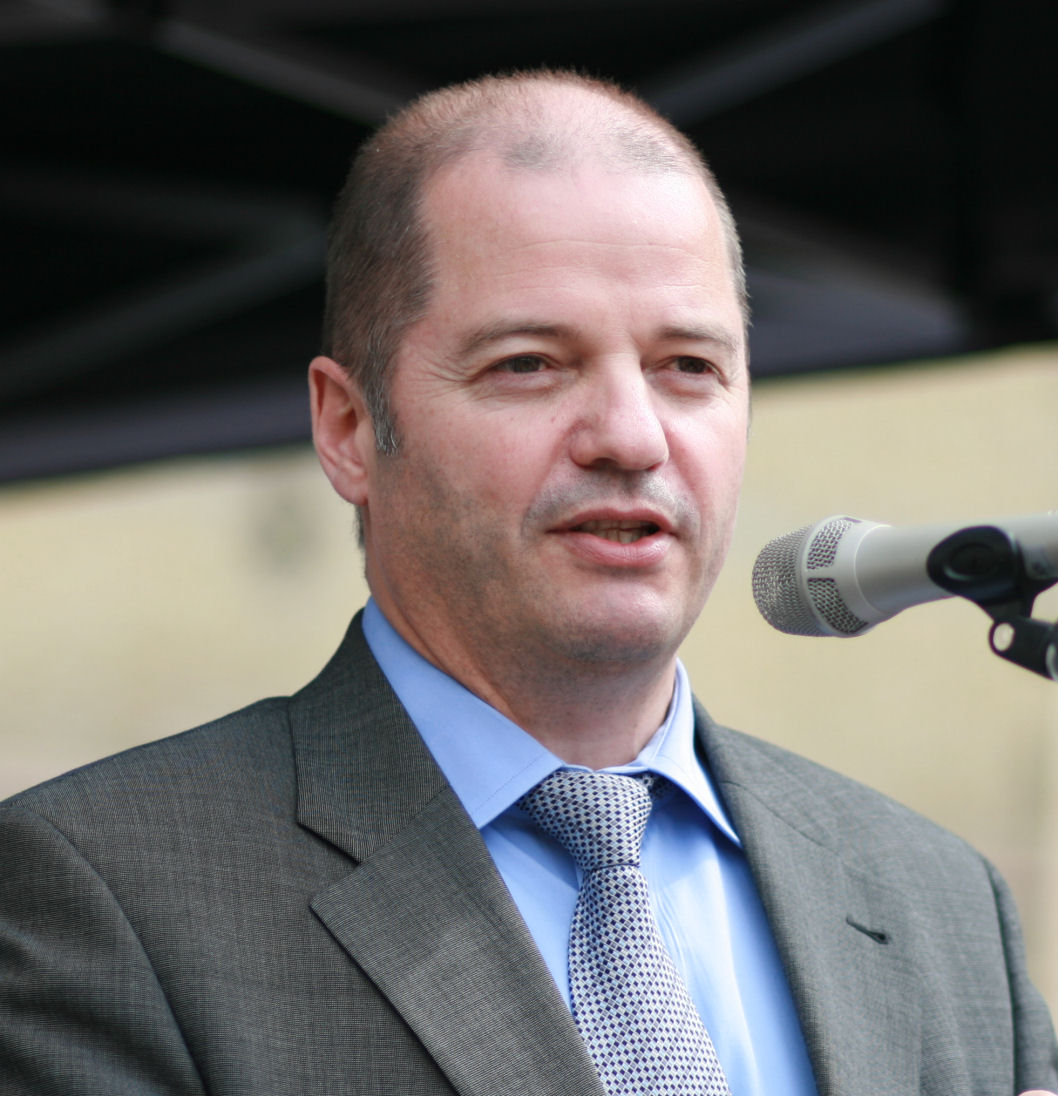

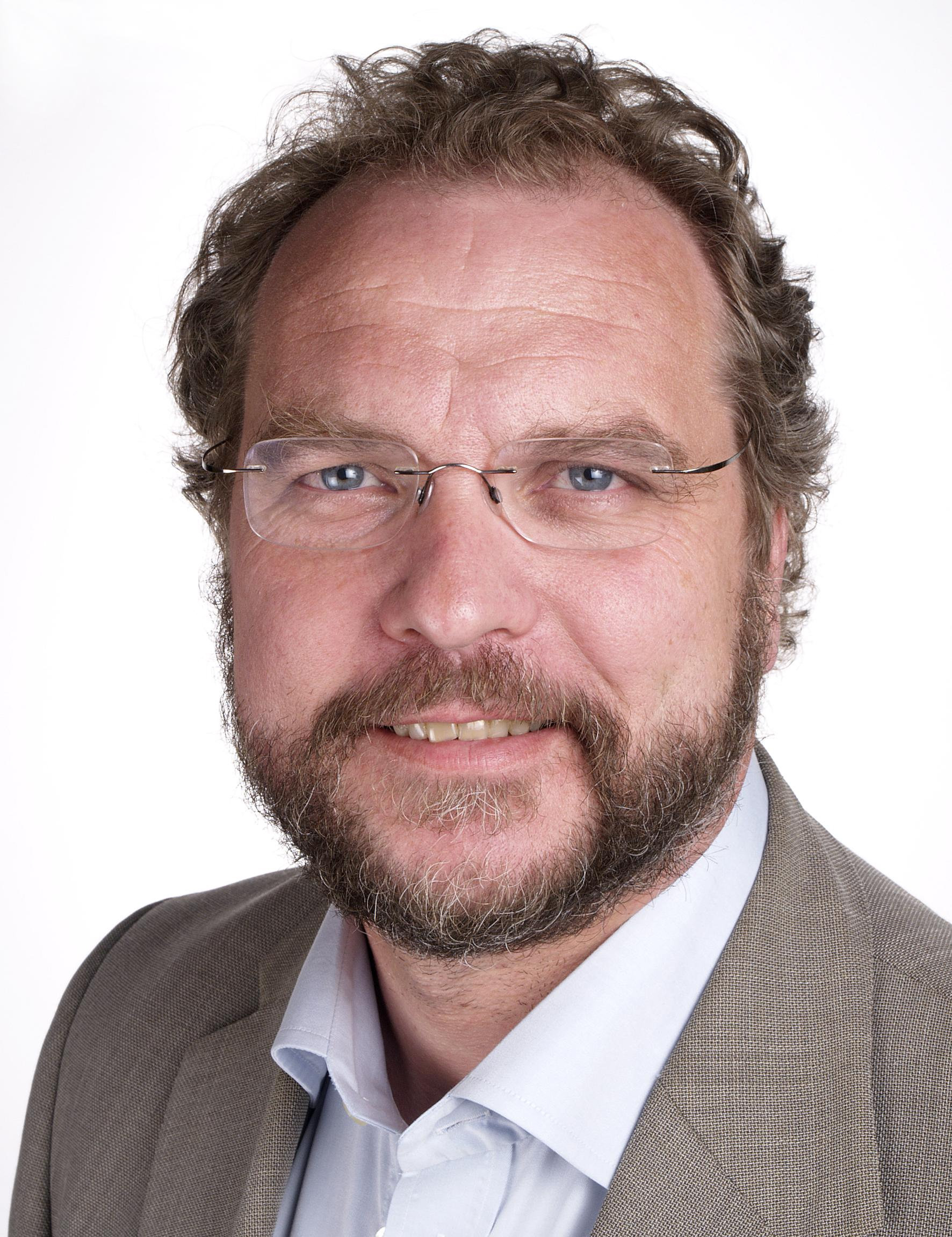
	First party	Second party	Third party
Leader	Jens Stoltenberg	Jan Petersen	Carl I. Hagen
Party	Labour	Conservative	Progress
Last election	35.00%, 65 seats	14.34%, 23 seats	15.30%, 25 seats
Seats won	43	38	26
Seat change	▼22	▲15	▲1
Popular vote	612,632	534,852	369,236
Percentage	24.29%	21.21%	14.64%
Swing	▼10.71 pp	▲6.87 pp	▼0.66 pp
	Fourth party	Fifth party	Sixth party
Leader	Kristin Halvorsen	Kjell Magne Bondevik	Odd Roger Enoksen
Party	Socialist Left	Christian; Democratic	Centre
Last election	6.01%, 9 seats	13.66%, 25 seats	7.93%, 11 seats
Seats won	23	22	10
Seat change	▲14	▼3	▼1
Popular vote	316,397	312,839	140,287
Percentage	12.55%	12.41%	5.56%
Swing	▲6.54 pp	▼1.25 pp	▼2.37 pp
	Seventh party	Eighth party
Leader	Lars Sponheim	Steinar Bastesen
Party	Liberal	Coastal
Last election	4.45%, 6 seats	–
Seats won	2	1
Seat change	▼4	New
Popular vote	98,486	44,010
Percentage	3.91%	1.75%
Swing	▼0.54 pp	New
- Largest bloc and seats won by constituency
Prime Minister before election
Jens Stoltenberg
Labour
Prime Minister after election
Kjell Magne Bondevik
Christian Democratic

Parliamentary elections were held in Norway on 9 and 10 September 2001. The governing Labour Party lost seats and their vote share was the worst they had ever obtained in a post-war election. Although they still won a plurality of votes and seats, they were unable to form a government. Instead, a centre-right coalition of the Conservative Party, the Christian Democratic Party and Liberal Party was formed, led by Prime Minister Kjell Magne Bondevik of the Christian Democratic Party, with confidence and supply support from the Progress Party.

== Contesting parties ==
Name		Ideology	Position	Leader	1997 result	
Name		Ideology	Position	Leader	Votes (%)	Seats
Ap	Labour Party; Arbeiderpartiet	Social democracy	Centre-left	Thorbjørn Jagland	35.0%	65 / 165
FrP	Progress Party; Fremskrittspartiet	Conservative liberalism	Right-wing	Carl I. Hagen	15.3%	25 / 165
H	Conservative Party; Høyre	Conservatism	Centre-right	Jan Petersen	14.3%	23 / 165
KrF	Christian Democratic Party; Kristelig Folkeparti	Christian democracy	Centre to centre-right	Kjell Magne Bondevik	13.6%	25 / 165
Sp	Centre Party; Senterpartiet	Agrarianism	Centre	Odd Roger Enoksen	7.9%	11 / 165
SV	Socialist Left Party; Sosialistisk Venstreparti	Democratic socialism	Left-wing	Kristin Halvorsen	6.0%	9 / 165
V	Liberal Party; Venstre	Social liberalism	Centre	Lars Sponheim	4.4%	6 / 165
Kp	Coastal Party; Kystpartiet	Northern-regionalism	Centre to centre-right	Steinar Bastesen	new	1 / 165

== Campaign ==
=== Slogans ===
Party	Original slogan	English translation
Labour Party	"Hvis velferd er viktigst"	"If welfare is the most important"
Progress Party	"For folk flest"	"For most people"
Christian Democratic Party	"Varmere samfunn"	"Warmer society"
Conservative Party	"Ny kurs. Nye muligheter"	"New course, new opportunities"
Centre Party	"Ta Norge i bruk"	"Use Norway"
Socialist Left Party	"Barn og unge først"	"Children and young people first"
Liberal Party	"Du er sjefen"	"You’re the boss"
Red Electoral Alliance	"Opprørsvalg"	"Riot election (rebellion)"

== Opinion polls ==
Polls are indicated by share of votes in percentage, or by seats indicated by brackets. The Progress Party saw the most surprising changes in support, having achieved as high as 34.7% in September 2000, and in 2001 almost closing down to 10% at the lowest. The Labour Party and Conservative Party also varied greatly in support in the years before the election.

Polling firm	Fieldwork date	Sample size	RV	SV	Ap	Sp	V	KrF	H	FrP	Others	Lead
2001 election	9–10 September 2001	–	1.2	12.5	24.3	5.6	3.9	12.4	21.2	14.6	4.3	3.1
Norsk Gallup	September 2001	–	–	15.0	25.5	4.5	2.5	11.0	25.5	11.5	–	Tie
AC Nielsen Norge	September 2001	–	1.2	12.2	24.9	5.0	3.4	14.8	21.7	13.5	3.3	3.2
MMI	September 2001	–	1.1	12.0	26.2	4.7	3.8	11.7	22.9	14.0	3.5	3.3
Norsk Gallup	27 Aug-2 Sep 2000	993	–	14.0	26.5	6.0	2.5	11.0	23.5	12.0	–	3.0
MMI	18 Aug 2001	–	0.9	8.9	26.4	5.0	2.9	13.2	26.6	14.2	1.8	0.2
MMI	June 2001	–	1.0	7.7	24.0	6.2	1.9	12.7	30.9	14.0	1.7	6.9
Norsk Gallup	April 2001	–	–	10.0	31.0	5.0	4.0	13.5	20.5	11.0	3.5	10.5
Din Mening/Norsk Statistikk	March 2001	–	1.5	9.7	30.4	7.6	3.8	14.4	18.4	13.7	–	12.0
Norsk Gallup	March 2001	–	–	10.0	29.0	5.5	3.5	9.0	22.0	17.5	1.5	7.0
Din Mening/Norsk Statistikk	February 2001	–	1.3	7.1	30.6	7.1	3.4	13.0	17.8	18.5	–	12.1
Norsk Gallup	12 May 2000	–	–	7.5	27.5	5.5	2.5	13.0	17.5	23.5	–	4.0
Norsk Gallup	Nov 2000	–	–	10.0	24.5	5.0	3.5	11.5	17.0	27.0	–	2.5
Opinion	13 Oct 2000	–	–	–	22.7	4.4	2.7	12.8	16.0	29.8	–	7.1
AC Nielsen	29 Sep 2000	–	–	8.0	25.5	4.9	3.3	10.8	10.6	34.7	–	9.2
Norsk Gallup	5 Sep 2000	–	2.0	9.0	24.0	6.0	3.0	12.0	17.5	28.0	–	4.0
Nationen	Aug 2000	–	–	7.8	22.1	6.6	3.5	16.4	14.9	24.8	–	2.7
Opinion	25 Aug 2000	–	–	9.9	27.2	–	4.5	11.8	15.4	22.5	–	4.7
Norsk Gallup	August 2000	–	2.5	8.5	29.0	6.5	2.5	11.0	19.0	22.5	–	6.5
Nationen	July 2000	–	–	8.3	29.2	6.9	2.3	13.5	14.4	23.2	–	6.0
MMI	5-8 Jun 2000	902	0.8	6.7	32.8	5.8	2.9	12.8	17.9	19.4	1.0	13.4
MMI	May 2000	–	1.7	7.7	38.8	4.9	3.5	13.0	12.3	16.7	1.5	22.1
1997 election	15 Sep 1997	–	1.7	6.0	35.0	7.9	4.5	13.7	14.3	15.3	1.6	2.4

== Results ==
Party	Votes	%	Seats	+/–
Labour Party	612,632	24.29	43	–22
Conservative Party	534,852	21.21	38	+15
Progress Party	369,236	14.64	26	+1
Socialist Left Party	316,397	12.55	23	+14
Christian Democratic Party	312,839	12.41	22	–3
Centre Party	140,287	5.56	10	–1
Liberal Party	98,486	3.91	2	–4
Coastal Party	44,010	1.75	1	New
Red Electoral Alliance	30,015	1.19	0	0
The Political Party	19,457	0.77	0	New
Pensioners' Party	17,940	0.71	0	0
Christian Unity Party	6,731	0.27	0	New
Environment Party The Greens	3,785	0.15	0	0
Sørland List	2,407	0.10	0	New
Fatherland Party	2,353	0.09	0	0
Hospital List	2,141	0.08	0	New
Communist Party	1,726	0.07	0	0
Norwegian People's Party	1,609	0.06	0	New
Non-Partisan Coastal and Rural District Party	1,052	0.04	0	0
People's Action No to More Road Tolls	692	0.03	0	New
Sámi People's Party	564	0.02	0	New
Oslo List	396	0.02	0	New
Hordaland List	389	0.02	0	New
Social Democrats	351	0.01	0	New
Natural Law Party	269	0.01	0	0
Sørland List Aust-Agder	211	0.01	0	New
Østfold List	179	0.01	0	New
Oppland List	170	0.01	0	New
Liberal People's Party	166	0.01	0	0
Justice Party	138	0.01	0	0
Nordland List	111	0.00	0	New
Hedmark List	93	0.00	0	New
Tromsø List	70	0.00	0	New
Society Party	66	0.00	0	0
Total	2,521,820	100.00	165	0
Valid votes	2,521,820	99.38		
Invalid/blank votes	15,813	0.62		
Total votes	2,537,633	100.00		
Registered voters/turnout	3,359,433	75.54		
Source: Nohlen & Stöver, Storting

=== Voter demographics ===
Cohort	Percentage of cohort voting for							
Cohort	Ap	H	FrP	Sv	KrF	Sp	V	Others
Total vote	24.29%	21.21%	14.64%	12.55%	12.41%	5.56%	3.91%	
Gender
Females	26.2%	19%	10.9%	15.4%	5.5%	5.5%	3.4%	
Males	22.5%	23.2%	18.3%	9.8%	5.7%	5.7%	4.4%	
Age
18–30 years old	16.2%	22.4%	14.5%	21.2%	9.1%	3.7%	3.7%	
30-59 years old	25.1%	23.2%	12.6%	13.3%	11.6%	5.6%	4.2%	
60 years old and older	27.2%	15.7%	19.6%	5.4%	16.4%	6.4%	3.4%	
Work
low income	23.6%	13.8%	17%	14.4%	15.4%	6.7%	2.8%	
Average income	22.8%	20.7%	14.8%	12.9%	12.7%	6.3%	3.6%	
High income	26.5%	29.2%	10.8%	11%	9.7%	3.7%	5.5%	
Education
Primary school	27.7%	12.3%	24.5%	7.5%	12.3%	5.9%	1.6%	
High school	24.7%	21.9%	15%	11.4%	13.1%	6.6%	2.6%	
University/college	22.1%	24.1%	7.8%	17.9%	11.3%	3.4%	8.3%	
Source: Norwegian Institute for Social Research

=== Seat distribution ===
Constituency	Total seats	Seats won									
Constituency	Total seats	By party								By coalition	
Constituency	Total seats	Ap	H	FrP	SV	KrF	Sp	V	KP	Borgerlig	Red-green
Akershus	15	3	5	3	2	1	1			9	6
Aust-Agder	4	1	1	1		1				3	1
Buskerud	7	2	2	1	1	1				4	3
Finnmark	4	2	1		1					1	3
Hedmark	8	3	1	1	1	1	1			3	5
Hordaland	17	3	4	3	2	3	1	1		11	6
Møre og Romsdal	10	2	2	2	1	2	1			6	4
Nord-Trøndelag	6	2		1	1	1	1			2	4
Nordland	12	3	2	2	2	1	1		1	6	6
Oppland	7	3	1	1	1		1			2	5
Oslo	16	4	5	2	3	1		1		9	7
Østfold	8	2	2	2	1	1				5	3
Rogaland	11	2	3	2	1	2	1			7	4
Sogn og Fjordane	5	1	1		1	1	1			2	3
Sør-Trøndelag	10	3	2	1	2	1	1			4	6
Telemark	6	2	1	1	1	1				3	3
Troms	6	2	1	1	1	1				3	3
Vest-Agder	5	1	2			2				4	1
Vestfold	8	2	2	2	1	1				5	3
Total	165	43	38	26	23	22	10	2	1	89	76
Source: Statistics Norway
