= Roy Waage =

Norwegian politician (born 1963)

Mayor of Skjervøy Municipality
- In office 1995–2011
- Preceded by: Kurt Leif Strøm
- Succeeded by: Torgeir Johnsen

Personal details
- Born: 17 November 1963 (age 62)
- Party: Coastal Party

Roy Waage (born 17 November 1963) is a Norwegian politician for the Coastal Party, He was mayor of Skjervøy Municipality from 1995 until 2011.

He was originally a member of the Christian Democrats, serving as a deputy representative to the Norwegian Parliament from Troms during the term 1997–2001.

He switched to the Coastal Party after it was created in the late 1999. He was top candidate for the party in Troms in the 2001 election but marginally failed to get elected. In the 2003 local elections he was elected member for the Troms county council and re-elected mayor of Skjervøy Municipality, something he has been since 1995.

On 13 March 2005 he was appointed chairman of the party, a position he held until 1 May 2007. The party failed to get legislative representation in the 2005 election, but Waage was again re-elected mayor of Skjervøy in the 2007 local elections.

Party political offices
Preceded by Steinar Bastesen	Chairman of the Coastal Party; 2005–2007	Succeeded by Jan Helge Jensen
Political offices
Preceded by Kurt-Leif Strøm	Mayor of Skjervøy Municipality; 1995–2011	Succeeded by Torgeir Johnsen
