= Anne Karin Hamre =

Norwegian politician and civil servant

Governor of Sogn og Fjordane
- In office 2011–2018
- Preceded by: Oddvar Flæte
- Succeeded by: Gunnar O. Hæreid

Personal details
- Born: 1965 (age 60–61) Leikanger, Norway
- Citizenship: Norway
- Education: Cand.polit.
- Alma mater: University of Bergen
- Profession: Civil servant

Anne Karin Hamre (born 1965) is a Norwegian politician and civil servant. She served as the County Governor of Sogn og Fjordane county from 2011 until 2018. She was the first woman to hold this position as well as the youngest governor in the country. She was also the last governor of Sogn og Fjordane because on 1 January 2019, she was replaced by the new County Governor of Vestland. Since she resigned in the fall of 2018, her assistant governor, Gunnar O. Hæreid was the acting governor until the end of the year.

Starting in the fall of 2018, Hamre took a job in the Ministry of Local Government and Regional Development leading a department on regional development.

Government offices
Preceded by Oddvar Flæte	County Governor of Sogn og Fjordane; 2011–13 August 2018	Office abolished Office merged into County Governor of Vestland; Gunnar O. Hæreid was named Acting Governor for the remainder of 2018.
