= Ulveseth =

Ulveseth is a surname. Notable people with the surname include:

- Ingvald Ulveseth (1924–2008), Norwegian politician
- Sigurd Ulveseth (born 1953), Norwegian jazz musician
