= Ingolf Elster Christensen =

Norwegian politician, jurist, and military officer (1872–1943)

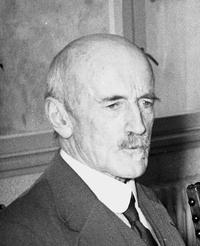

Chair of the Administrative Council
- In office 15 April 1940 – 25 September 1940
- Preceded by: Position established
- Succeeded by: Position abolished

County Governor of Akershus and Oslo
- In office 1930–1941
- Prime Minister: J. L. Mowinckel; Peder Kolstad; Jens Hundseid; Johan Nygaardsvold
- Preceded by: Hroar Olsen
- Succeeded by: Eivind Stenersen Blehr

County Governor of Sogn og Fjordane
- In office 1910–1930
- Prime Minister: Wollert Konow; Jens Bratlie; Gunnar Knudsen; Otto B. Halvorsen; Otto Blehr; Abraham Berge; J. L. Mowinckel; Christopher Hornsrud
- Preceded by: John Utheim
- Succeeded by: Hans Kristian Seip

Minister of Defence
- In office 26 July 1926 – 28 January 1928
- Prime Minister: Ivar Lykke
- Preceded by: Karl W. Wefring
- Succeeded by: Fredrik Monsen

Minister of Justice
- In office 5 March 1926 – 26 July 1926
- Prime Minister: Ivar Lykke
- Preceded by: Paal Berg
- Succeeded by: Knud Øyen

Member of the Norwegian Parliament
- In office 1 January 1922 – 31 December 1927
- Constituency: Sogn og Fjordane

Personal details
- Born: 28 March 1872 Førde, Sogn og Fjordane, Sweden-Norway
- Died: 3 May 1943 (aged 71) Førde, Sogn og Fjordane, Norway
- Party: Conservative
- Spouse: Else Marie Helberg (m. 1897)
- Children: 2

Ingolf Elster Christensen (28 March 1872 – 3 May 1943) was a Norwegian jurist, military officer, county governor, and Member of Parliament from the Conservative Party.

== Biography ==
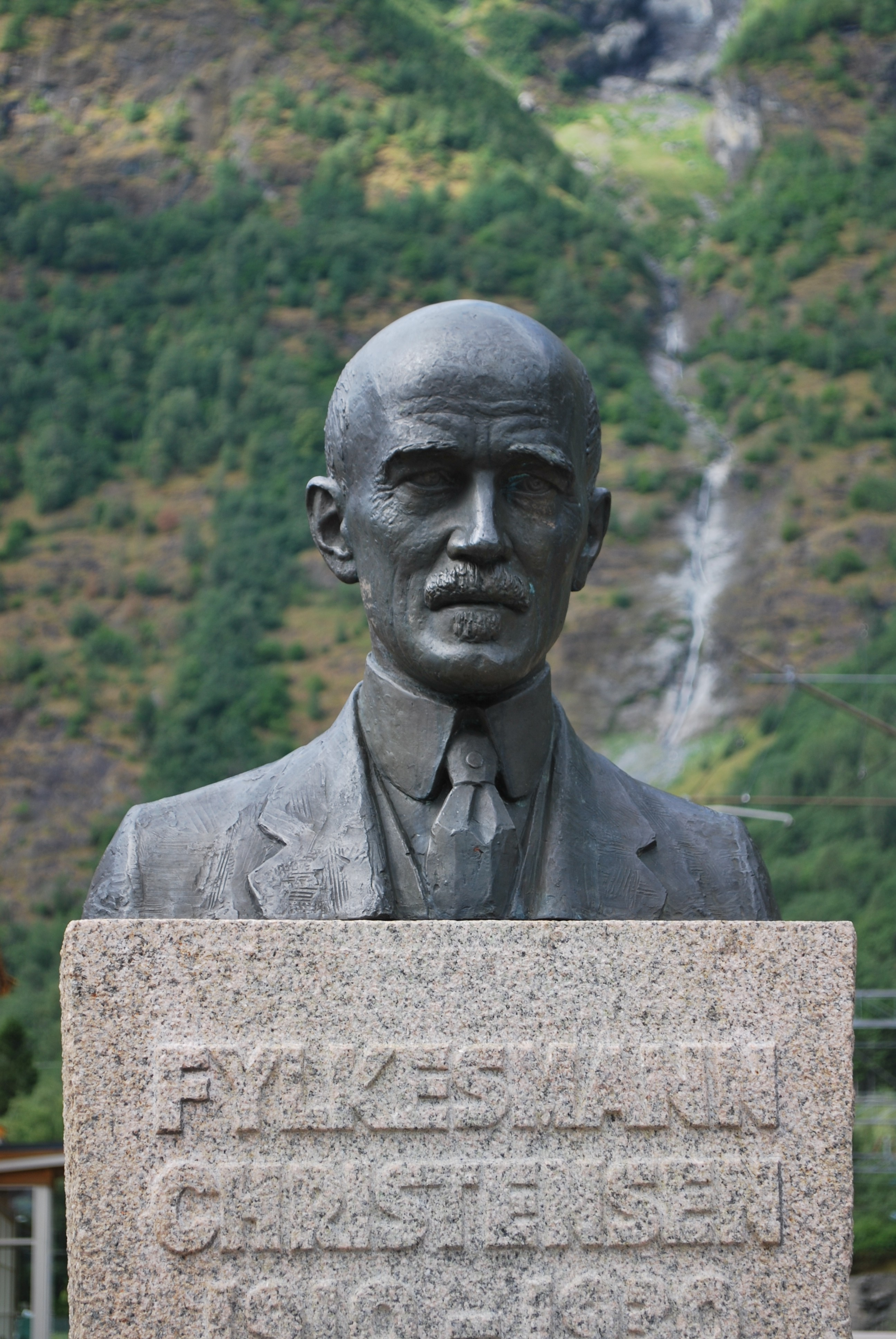
Memorial statue of Christensen in Flåm

Christensen was born at Sunnfjord in Sogn og Fjordane, Norway. He was the son of Michael Sundt Tuchsen Christensen (1827–1895) and Frederikke Sophie Elster (1838–1927). He was a brother of author and critic Hjalmar Christensen.

Christensen graduated from Bergen Cathedral School in 1889 and then went to the Norwegian Military Academy, where he graduated as an officer in 1893. He was appointed governor of the County of Nordre Bergenhus in 1910 and held the position until 1929 (in 1919 the county was renamed Sogn og Fjordane). He was subsequently county governor of Oslo and Akershus from 1929 to 1941.

He was Minister of Justice in 1926, Minister of Defense (1926–1928), Member of Parliament (1922–1924, 1925–1927) and was a member of the Executive Board of the Conservative Party.

After the German invasion of Norway in April 1940, he was elected Chairman of the new Administrative Council that was put up by the Norwegian Supreme Court and functioned from April to September 1940. The council held negotiations with the Germans and Christensen was regarded by the Germans as a possible leader of a suggested Riksråd that should govern Norway. The negotiations however failed and came to an end in September 1940. He then returned to his office as county governor until 1941 when he was replaced by a member of Nasjonal Samling. After that he withdrew to his family farm and did not play a political role any longer.

Government offices
| Preceded by John Utheim | County Governor of Nordre Bergenhus amt 1910–1930 (after 1919 the county was named Sogn og Fjordane) | Succeeded by Hans Kristian Seip |
| Preceded by Hroar Olsen | County Governor of Akershus & Oslo; 1930–1941 | Succeeded by Eivind Stenersen Blehr (Acting governor under occupation) |
| New title | Chairman of the Administrative Council; April 1940—September 1940 | Office abolished Replaced by Josef Terboven, the newly appointed German Commissioner for Norway |
