= Hjalmar Christensen =

Norwegian writer and literary critic (1869–1925)

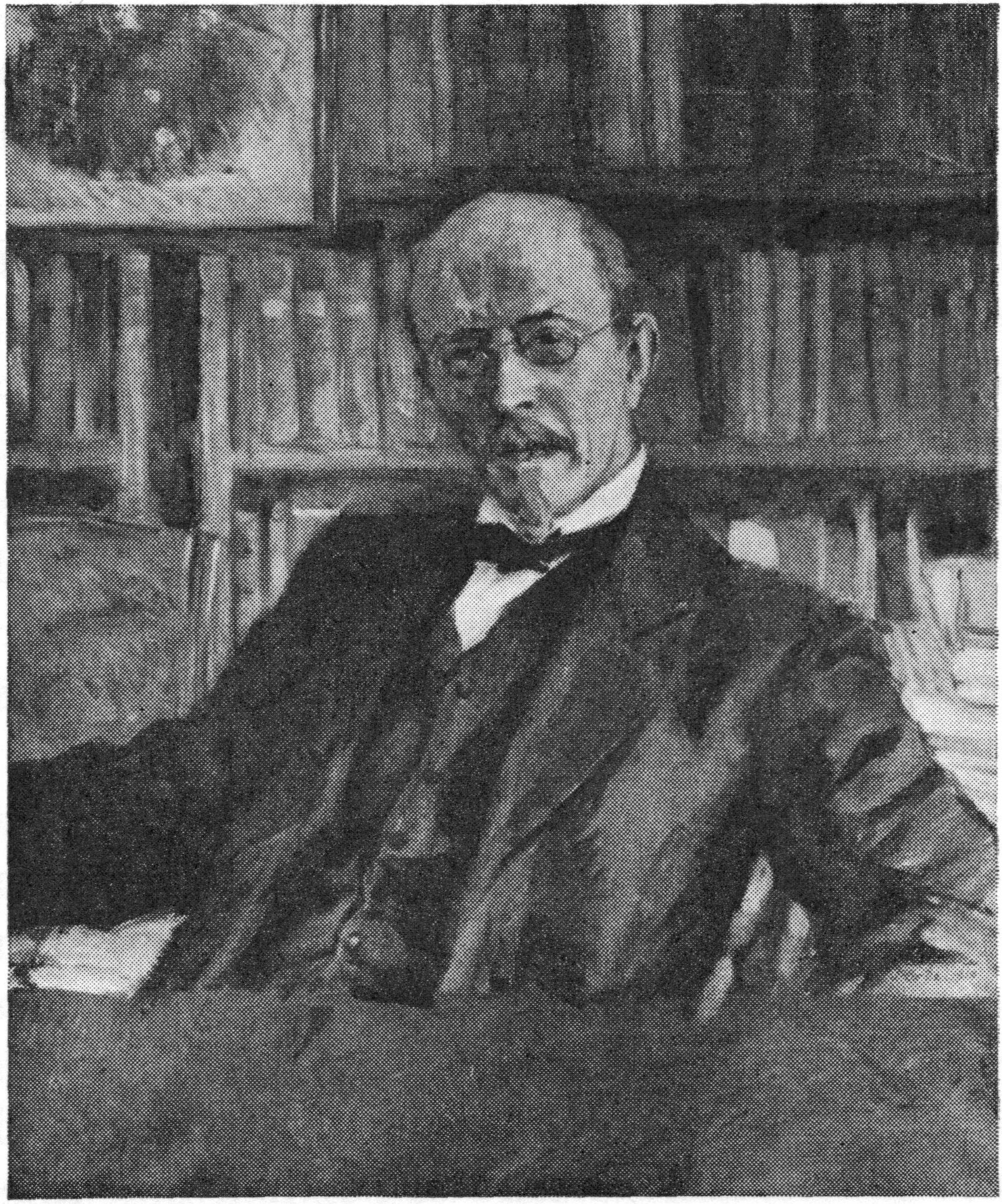
- Christensen in 1919
- Born: 5 May 1869; Sunnfjord, Sogn og Fjordane, Norway
- Died: 29 December 1925 (aged 56)
- Education: Royal Frederick University
- Relatives: Ingolf Elster Christensen (brother)

Hjalmar Christensen (5 May 1869 – 29 December 1925) was a Norwegian writer and a prominent literary critic.

== Biography ==
Christensen was born at Sunnfjord in Sogn og Fjordane, Norway. He was raised on a farm in Førde Municipality. He was the son of Michael Sundt Tuchsen Christensen (1827–95) and Frederikke Sophie Elster (1838–1927). His brother Ingolf Elster Christensen served as a government official and a member of the Storting.

He attended Bergen Cathedral School. He studied law and received a legal degree at the Royal Frederick University (now University of Oslo) in 1892. From 1893 to 1898, Christensen was an instructor at the Christiania Theater and lectured for several years at the Bergen Museum. In 1898, the post as professor of literary history at the Royal Frederick University had become vacant. Christensen applied for the post which went to Gerhard Gran. He subsequently studied classical philology and history and in 1902 was awarded his Dr. philos.

Christensen wrote a number of articles in magazines, weeklies, and newspapers. He also wrote thirty-two books, many featuring communities in Sunnfjord. Christensen published a number of novels with cultural history content. His most noted book Fogedgården, Af en bygds historie (1911) featured a culture description of life in Førde.

== Selected works ==
- Det retfærdige spil (1900)
- Vort litterære liv (1902)
- Danske digtere i nutiden (1904)
- Unge aa (1905)
- Et liv (1909)
- Fogedgården (1911)
- Brødrene (1911)
- Den gamle bygd (1913)
- Din egen herre (1913)
- Den nye bygd (1914)
- Far og søn (1915)
- Den hvide races selvmord (1916)
- Tuntræet (1917)
- Dæmring (1918)
- Professor Marga (1920)
- Klostret paa Undrum (1924)

== Other sources ==
- Downs; Downs, Brian Westerdale Downs (January 1966). Modern Norwegian Literature 1860 1918. (Cambridge University Press). pp. 249–. ISBN 978-0-521-04854-5.
- Jorgenson, Theodore (1939) History of Norwegian Literature (Haskell House Publishing) ISBN 978-0838311677
