= List of county governors of Sogn og Fjordane =

The county governor of Sogn og Fjordane county in Norway represented the central government administration in the county. The office of county governor is a government agency of the Kingdom of Norway; the title was Amtmann (before 1919) and then Fylkesmann (after 1919). On 1 January 2019, the office was merged with the county governor of Hordaland into the county governor of Vestland.

The county called Nordre Bergenhus amt was established by the king in 1763 when it was split off from the large Bergenhus amt. The seat of the amt was at Leikanger. Prior to 1919, this county was subordinate to the diocesan governor of Bergen.

The county governor is the government's representative in the county. The governor carries out the resolutions and guidelines of the Storting and government. This is done first by the county governor performing administrative tasks on behalf of the ministries. Secondly, the county governor also monitors the activities of the municipalities and is the appeal body for many types of municipal decisions.

== Names ==
The word for county (amt or fylke) has changed over time as has the name of the county. From 1671 until 1918 the title was Amtmann i Nordre Bergenhus amt. From 1 January 1919 until 1 January 2019, the title was Fylkesmann i Sogn og Fjordane fylke.

== List of county governors ==
Sogn og Fjordane county has had the following governors:

County governors of Sogn og Fjordane
Start	End	Name
1763	1771	Joachim de Knagenhielm (1727–1796)
1771	1779	Magnus Theiste (1725–1791)
1780	1781	Ditlev von Pentz (1725–1791)
1781	1788	Jonas R. Petersen (1748–1804)
1788	1789	Nils Dorph Gunnerus (1751–1789)
1789	1794	Peter Hersleb Harboe (1755–1794)
1794	1802	Andreas Hiort (1740–1817)
1802	1811	Niels Andreas Vibe (1759–1814)
1811	1811	Hilmar Meincke Krohg (1776–1851); Appointed, but never took office.
1811	1814	Herman Gerhard Treschow (1780–1836)
1814	1822	Christian Magnus Falsen (1782–1830)
1822	1831	Edvard Hagerup (1781–1853)
1831	1832	Fredrik Riis (1789–1845)
1833	1844	Christian Ulrik Kastrup (1784–1850)
1844	1852	Hans Tostrup (1799–1856)
1852	1860	Michael Aubert (1811–1872)
1861	1869	Johan Collett Falsen (1817–1879)
1870	1875	Nicolai Ditlev Ammon Ræder (1817–1884)
1875	1889	Carl Lauritz Mechelborg Oppen (1830–1914)
1889	1902	Olaj Olsen (1851–1920)
1902	1910	John Utheim (1847–1910)
1910	1930	Ingolf E. Christensen (1872–1943)
1930	25 July 1941	Hans Kristian Seip (1881–1945)
26 July 1941	1 July 1944	Vidar Atne (1909–1961) (Acting governor for WWII occupied government)
1 July 1944	1945	Konrad Sundlo (1881–1965) (WWII occupied government)
1945	1971	Nikolai Schei (1901–1985)
1971	1976	Arne Ekeberg (1925–present) (Acting for Ulveseth)
1976	1994	Ingvald Ulveseth (1924–2008)
1 Aug 1994	2011	Oddvar Flæte (1944–present)
2011	13 Aug 2018	Anne Karin Hamre (1965–present)
13 Aug 2018	31 Dec 2018	Gunnar O. Hæreid (1970–present) (Acting governor)
Office abolished on 1 January 2019. See List of county governors of Vestland
