= Inger Stolt-Nielsen =

Norwegian schoolteacher and politician

- Born: 5 March 1943 (age 83); Haugesund, Norway
- Occupations: Schoolteacher; Politician

Inger Stolt-Nielsen (born 5 March 1943) is a Norwegian schoolteacher and politician.

She was born in Haugesund to Andreas Stolt-Nielsen and Constance Lothe. She was elected representative to the Storting for the period 1997–2001 for the Conservative Party (transfer to the Coastal Party at the end of the term).
