= John Utheim =

Norwegian politician

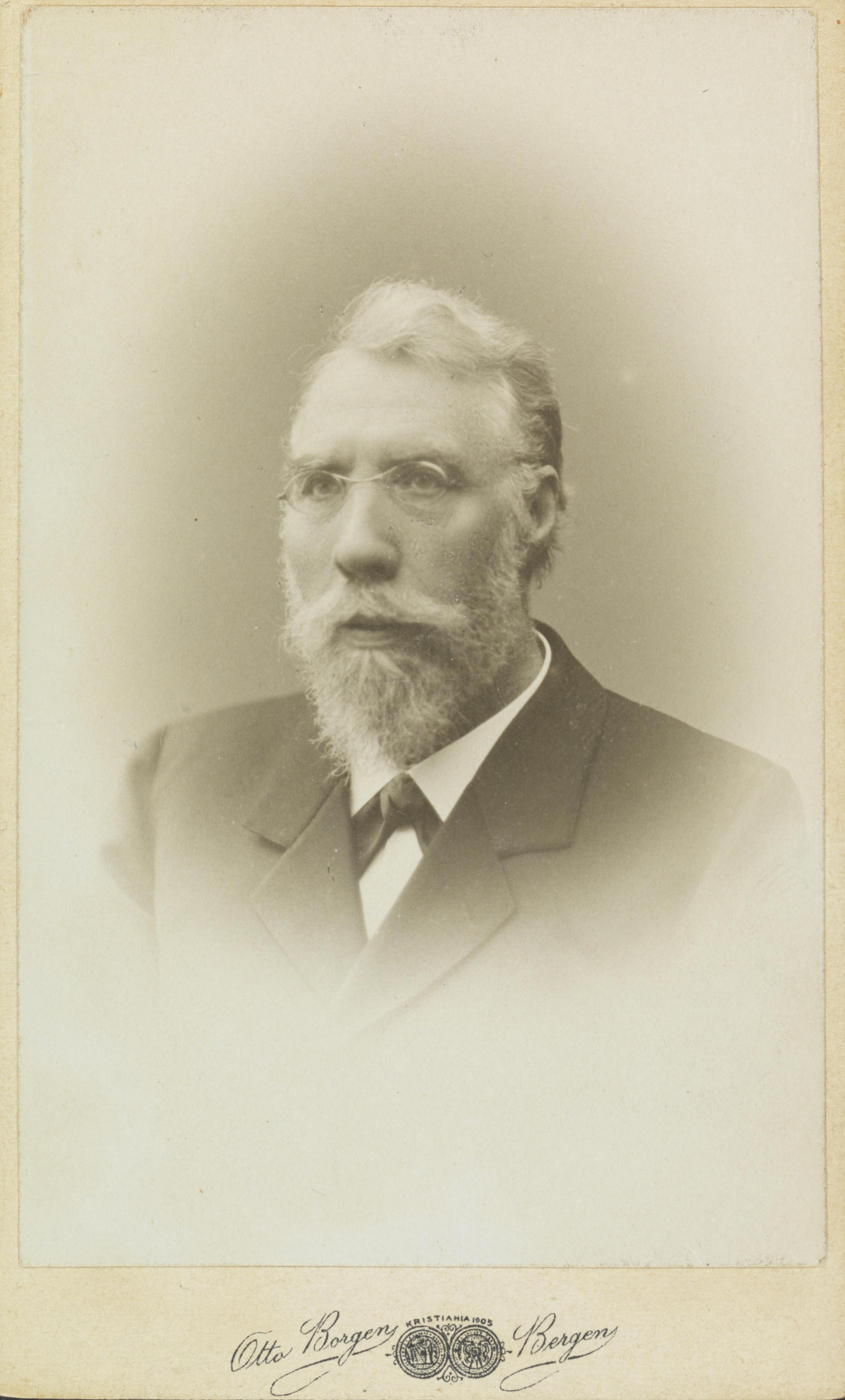
John Jonsson Utheim

John Utheim (13 January 1847–16 September 1910) was a Norwegian teacher and politician for the Liberal Party.

John Jonsson Utheim was born on the island of Averøya in Romsdalen amt, Norway. He graduated with a cand.theol. degree in 1874. Between 1870 and 1875, he was a teacher in Qvam school and tutor in Trøgstad. From 1875 he was a teacher at the Oslo Cathedral School. He worked as a teacher from 1878 at the Norwegian Naval Academy in Horten and became an associate professor in 1890.

He was a member of the municipal council of Horten Municipality between 1883 and 1902, serving as mayor from 1899 to 1901. He was elected to the Norwegian Parliament from Jarlsberg og Larvik Amt (now Vestfold) in 1892 and sat until 1894. In 1902 he became County Governor of Nordre Bergenhus amt, which he held until his death in 1910. In 1884 he was a co-founder of the Norwegian Association for Women's Rights.

Government offices
Preceded by Olaj Olsen	County Governor of Nordre Bergenhus amt 1902–1910	Succeeded by Ingolf Elster Christensen
