= Coastal Party =

Norwegian political party

Coastal Party Kystpartiet
- Leader: Bengt Stabrun Johansen
- Founded: 1 February 1999
- Split from: Non-Partisan Deputies
- Headquarters: Grensen 8B; 0159 Oslo
- Youth wing: Kystpartiets Ungdom
- Ideology: Northern regionalism Nordic agrarianism National conservatism Euroscepticism
- Political position: Centre-right
- Colours: Green
- Parliament: 0 / 169
- County Councils: 1 / 728
- Municipal Councils: 1 / 10,781

Website
- www.kystpartiet.no

The Coastal Party (Norwegian: Kystpartiet) is a regionalist, agrarian political party in Norway. The party has district, fishing and coastal issues among its primary policies with its main political base in Northern Norway, and is a staunch opponent of Norwegian membership in the European Union. It was represented in the Norwegian Parliament from 2001 to 2005, and its predecessor, the Non-Partisan Deputies, from 1997 to 2001. Originally led by the fisherman and whale hunter Steinar Bastesen, its current leader is Bengt Stabrun Johansen (since 2012).

== History ==
The Coastal Party was formally founded on 1 February 1999 although the party participated, and won one seat, in the 1997 parliamentary election as the Non-Partisan Deputies. Since 1997 however, the name "Coastal Party" was commonly used to describe the parliamentary party, at least in its base in Northern Norway. In the county of Nordland, the list which ran in 1997 even went as "program for the Non-Partisan Deputies-Coastal Party". In February 2001, Conservative Party Member of Parliament Inger Stolt-Nielsen from Rogaland left the Conservatives and finished her term for the Coastal Party, giving the party two Members in Parliament until the 2001 election. The party's leader Steinar Bastesen, a fisherman and whale hunter, was elected to the parliament for a second period in 2001.

In 2005, the party announced that they would for the first time participate in the parliamentary election in all of Norway's 19 counties, even though two of them do not have a coastline. This is important for all political parties, however, as it is the only way to secure a place in the national pre-election television debates. On 13 March 2005, the party convention elected Roy Waage, a former member of the Christian Democratic Party, as the new party leader. In 2008, former party leader Steinar Bastesen was expelled from the party, and internal conflicts and poor leadership of the party has been cited to have contributed to the party's steady decline in subsequent elections.

== Political platform ==
The Coastal Party describe itself as a "culturally conservative centrist party", and its central value as being "safety". Other core issues are Christian values, environmentalism, and a mixed economy. The party is also against European Union and EEA membership, seeks a restrictive immigration policy, and preservation of the family, local community and nation.

== Election results ==
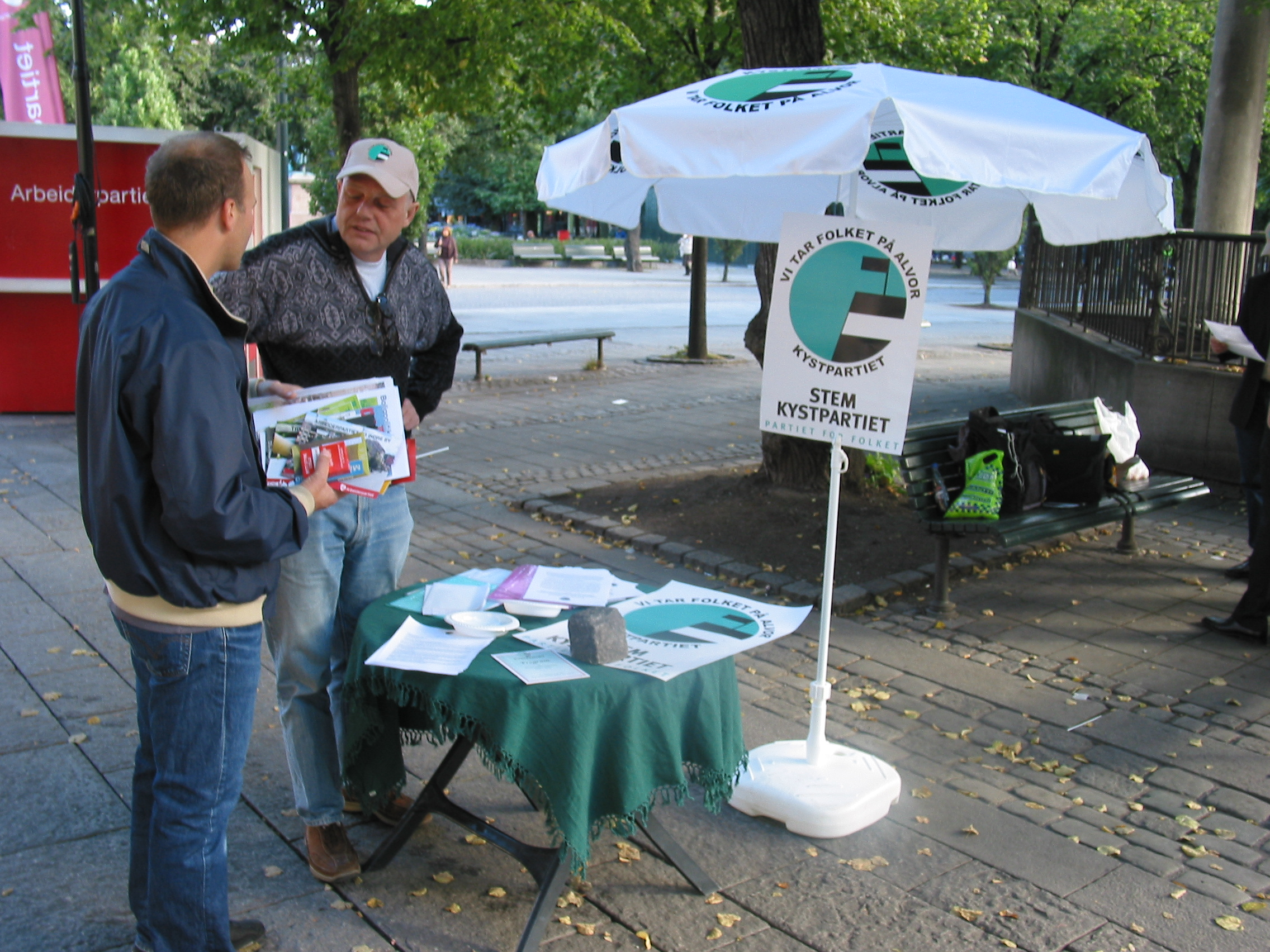
Campaign booth at Karl Johans gate ahead of the 2007 local elections.

The Coastal Party is to a very large degree regionally based. So far, it has not been able to pass the national 4% election threshold for leveling seats, but won a district seat in Nordland county in both 1997 (as the Non-Partisan Deputies) and 2001. In the 2005 parliamentary election, 59% of the party's votes came from the three northernmost counties: Finnmark, Troms and Nordland. Their best result came in Troms county, where they won 8.6% of the vote. In Karlsøy Municipality and Skjervøy Municipality, they received the highest vote count of all parties. In the country as a whole, however, they only won 0.8% of the vote (down from 1.7% in 2001) and lost its only seat in the Storting. The party's support has dropped further in parliamentary elections in 2009 and 2013 to 0.1%.

Storting elections
Date	Votes			Seats		Position	Size
Date	#	%	± pp	#	±	Position	Size
2001	44,010	1.7%	New	1 / 165	▲1	Opposition	8th
2005	21,948	0.8%	0.9	0 / 169	▼1	Extraparliamentary	9th
2009	5,341	0.2%	0.6	0 / 169	0	Extraparliamentary	11th
2013	3,311	0.1%	0.1	0 / 169	0	Extraparliamentary	13th
2017	2,467	0.1%	0.0	0 / 169	0	Extraparliamentary	17th

== Party leaders ==
- Steinar Bastesen (1999−2005)
- Roy Waage (2005−2007)
- Kjell Ivar Vestå (2007−2010)
- Erling Skåtøy (2010−2012)
- Bengt Stabrun Johansen (2012−)
