= Oddvar Flæte =

Norwegian politician and civil servant

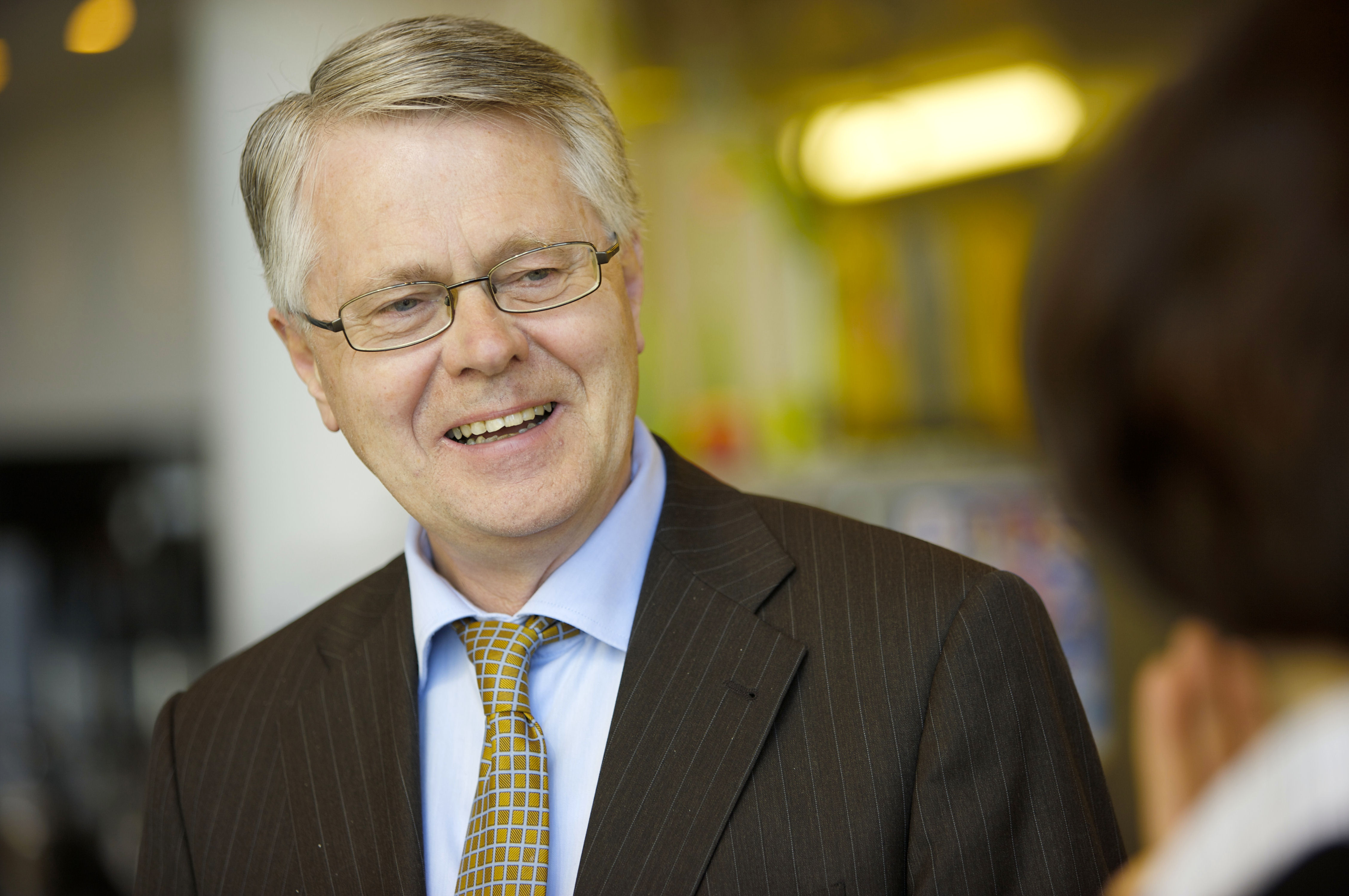
Oddvar Flæte

Oddvar Johannes Flæte (born 31 March 1944) is a Norwegian politician and civil servant.

He was born in Leikanger Municipality and grew up in Årdal Municipality, and graduated from the Norwegian School of Economics and Business Administration with a siviløkonom degree in 1971. He then worked in Høyanger Municipality and Vik Municipality from 1971 to 1982, in ÅSV Foredling from 1982 to 1983, in Norwegian Petroleum Consultants from 1983 to 1987, in his own consultant firm from 1987 and then in Norwegian State Railways from 1992 to 1994 as a sub-director. He became County Governor of Sogn og Fjordane in 1994. He retired in 2011.

Flæte was a politician in his younger days. He was a deputy representative to the Parliament of Norway from Sogn og Fjordane during the term 1977–1981. He met during 8 days of parliamentary session. In 2010 he led the committee that delivered the Norwegian Official Report 2010: 10. The report was about society's adaptation to extreme weather.

Government offices
Preceded by Ingvald Ulveseth	County Governor of Sogn og Fjordane; 1994–2011	Succeeded by Anne Karin Hamre
