= Harald Hove =

Norwegian jurist and politician

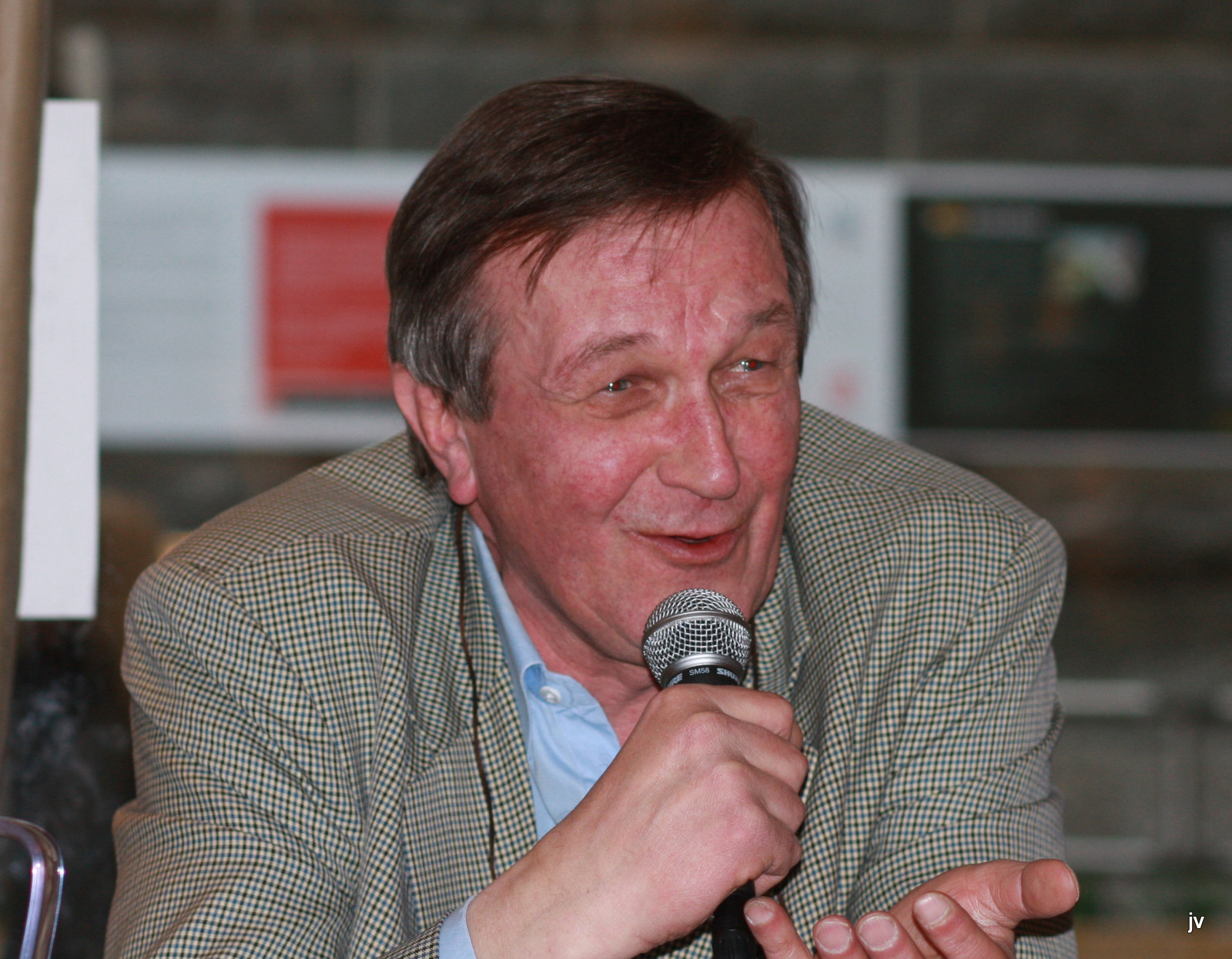
Harald Hove.

Harald Hove (10 January 1949 – 21 July 2014) was a Norwegian jurist and politician for the Liberal Party.

He served as a deputy representative to the Norwegian Parliament from Hordaland during the terms 1997–2001 and 2001–2005. From 1997 to 2000 he was a regular representative, covering for Lars Sponheim who was appointed to the first cabinet Bondevik.

On the local level Hove was a member of Hordaland county council from 1995 to 2011, except for his tenure as member of parliament. He chaired the regional party chapter from 1994 to 1998.

Outside politics he graduated as cand.jur. from the University of Bergen in 1976. He worked at the university as an associate professor from 1976 to 1988 and lecturer from 1993 to 1997. He also worked as a lawyer.
