= Steinar Bastesen =

Norwegian politician (1945–2024)

Leader of the Coastal Party
- In office 1 February 1999 – 3 March 2005
- Succeeded by: Roy Waage

Member of the Norwegian Parliament
- In office 17 October 1997 – 17 October 2005
- Prime Minister: Kjell Magne Bondevik (1997–2000, 2001–2005); Jens Stoltenberg (2000–2001)
- Constituency: Nordland

Personal details
- Born: 26 March 1945 Dønna, Norway
- Died: 18 February 2024 (aged 78) Brønnøysund, Norway
- Party: Centre Party (1966–77); Conservative Party (1977–91); Non-Partisan Deputies (1991–99, 2009); Coastal Party (1999–2008, 2017–24)

Steinar Bastesen (26 March 1945 – 18 February 2024) was a Norwegian politician, fisherman and whaler. He was first elected to the Norwegian Storting in 1997 as an independent candidate, and in 1999 broke out and founded the Coastal Party (Norwegian: Kystpartiet). He headed the party from its founding until March 2005, when disparity among the members forced him to give up his leadership. Bastesen kept his seat in the Storting until the 2005 election six months later.

== Life and career ==
Steinar Bastesen was born on the island of Dønna to fisherman Ingvart Meyer Bastesen and housewife Karly Edvarda, née Edvardsen. He first participated in whaling with his father in 1953, aged 8, and bought his first whaler ship in 1971 when he was 26. Later the same year he received an award from the Norwegian Society for Sea Rescue for rescuing people on a wrecked ship with his whaler ship during a severe storm. Bastesen became actively involved in local industry and politics in the late 1970s and later held elected positions in the organization for Norway's fishermen, Norges Fiskarlag, and in the organization for the sale of fish, Norges Råfisklag

He was the leader of an organization for whalers, Norges Småkvalfangerlag, from 1984 to 1996. In the 1980s he was active as a local politician for the Centre Party and later for the Conservative Party, before he became a member of parliament for the Non-Partisan Deputies (1997–2001) and the Coastal Party (2001–2005). In 2005, he resigned from the leadership position after internal disputes and was dismissed from the party altogether in 2008. He briefly attempted a return to politics for the Non-Partisan Deputies in 2009 and to the Coastal Party in 2017 and failed to get enough votes both times.

Bastesen was best known for his vigorous advocacy of whaling and usually appeared on television or at events wearing a seal-fur vest, which was met with controversy, especially abroad. While attending a trade convention in Fort Lauderdale, Florida in 1994, his vest was confiscated as it violated American import laws on whaling products and returned two years later via mail. In 1997, Canadian anti-whaling activist Paul Watson claimed in an NRK interview that Bastesen had threatened to kill him. Bastesen vehemently denied the allegation and sued NRK for defamation of character by letting the interview air. Bastesen won in the Oslo District Court but lost in 2002 in the appeal court, which found that Watson's accusation was of journalistic interest.

In 1998, Bastesen said that the whale Keiko, known from the Free Willy films, should be killed and the meat sent to Africa as foreign aid. This was his response to hearing that millions of dollars were being spent on preparing the whale for returning to the wild.

=== Health issues and death ===
Bastesen had struggled with health issues for the last decades of his life, which he later said were the result of an unhealthy lifestyle, excessive drinking, and overworking himself. In late 2001, he suffered a series of strokes that left him hospitalized for several months; during the first few weeks it was unclear if he would survive, and he eventually made a full recovery. In 2009, he again suffered a minor stroke while celebrating his 64th birthday and recovered quickly. Soon after, he was diagnosed with prostate cancer, and he made a full recovery. Bastesen exercised and changed his lifestyle to avoid further health issues, losing 30 kilograms (66 lb).

Bastesen died in a drowning accident near his home on 18 February 2024, at the age of 78.

== See also ==
- Hans Bauge
