= Arne Ekeberg =

Norwegian judge and civil servant

Arne Ekeberg (born 1925) is a Norwegian judge and civil servant.

Ekeberg was born in Fusa Municipality and graduated from the University of Oslo with a cand.jur. degree in 1950. After one year as a junior solicitor, he worked in the Ministry of Local Government from 1952 to 1956. During this period, he also had brief tenures as deputy judge in Hardanger District Court and secretary for the County Governor of Hordaland.

From 1956 to 1976, Ekeberg was a chief administrative officer of Sogn og Fjordane County Municipality. He was also acting County Governor of Sogn og Fjordane from 1971 to 1976, as the person who originally had been appointed, Ingvald Ulveseth, had to serve as a cabinet member. From 1976 to his retirement in 1995, Ekeberg was the district stipendiary magistrate of Sogn District Court. He filled in as an auxiliary judge in Gulating Court of Appeal between 1995 and 1998.

He resides in Leikanger Municipality.

Government offices
Preceded by Nikolai Schei	County Governor of Sogn og Fjordane; 1971–1976 (Acting governor while Ulveseth was in the Cabinet)	Succeeded by Ingvald Ulveseth
