= Hans Bauge =

Norwegian television personality

Hans Kristian Bauge
- Born: May 1, 1947 (age 78); Sandvika, Akershus, Norway

Hans Kristian Bauge (born 1947) is a Norwegian former taxi driver who became known as a participant in television debates in the 1990s.

== Biography ==
Bauge was a regular participant in the television programs Klart svar and Lønning & Staff and was often allowed to express his views. He was supposed to represent the "man on the street" and was popular for his personality, with thick glasses, clenched fists, and a loud voice characterized by anger and passion.

The background to Bauge's participation was a dispute he had with Oslo Taxisentral (and later the Oslo municipality itself) over the suspension of his taxi license. This came about after he had insisted on the rights to drive a taxi in a uniform of his own design and refusal to accept credit cards. He sent several faxes about his case to TVNorge and was eventually invited onto Klart svar.

In 1997, during an argument with Odd F. Lindberg over whaling on an episode of Lønning & Staff, Bauge produced a bloody cut of whale meat to emphasize his support for the practice.

Bauge was originally associated with the Progress Party, but later moved to the Norway Democrats. He received the second place nomination for the Norway Democrats in Akershus during the 2009 Norwegian parliamentary election.

== See also ==
- Steinar Bastesen
