= Ingvald Ulveseth =

Norwegian politician

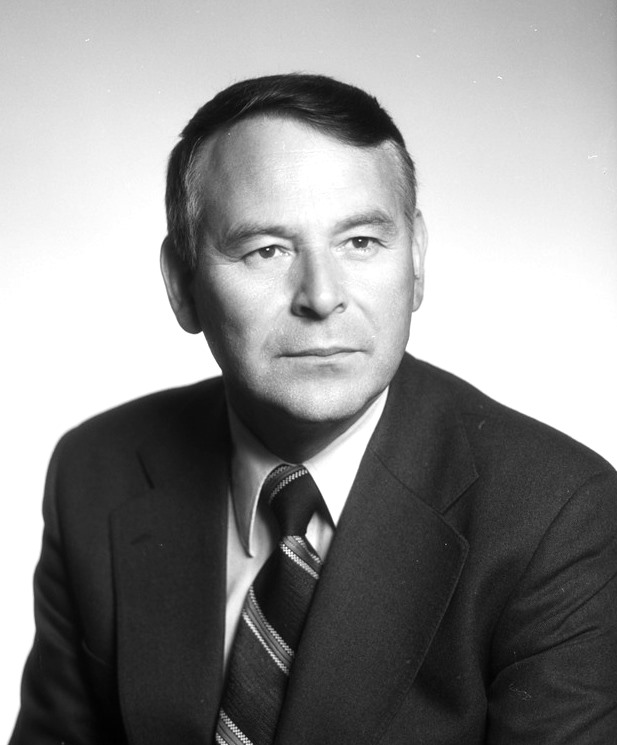
Ingvald Johan Ulveseth

Ingvald Johan Ulveseth (born 25 August 1924 in Fjell Municipality, died 14 March 2008) was a Norwegian politician for the Labour Party.

In 1964, during the third cabinet Gerhardsen, he was appointed state secretary in the Ministry of Local Government and Labour. He was elected to the Norwegian Parliament from Hordaland in 1965, and was re-elected on one occasion. He had previously served as a deputy representative during the term 1961–1965. During the second cabinet Bratteli from 1973 to 1976, Ulveseth was appointed Minister of Industry.

On the local level he was a member of the municipal council of Fjell Municipality from 1955 to 1967, serving as mayor from 1958 to 1965. From 1958 to 1965 he was also a member of Hordaland county council. His career in politics ended with the post of County Governor of Sogn og Fjordane, which he held from 1976 to 1994.

An engineer by profession, Ulveseth graduated from the Norwegian Institute of Technology in 1949.

Government offices
Preceded by Ola Skjåk Bræk	Minister of Industry; 1973–1976	Succeeded by Bjartmar Gjerde
Preceded by Arne Ekeberg (Acting governor while Ulveseth was in the Cabinet)	County Governor of Sogn og Fjordane; 1976–1994	Succeeded by Oddvar Flæte
