= List of county governors of Vestland =

The county governor of Vestland county in Norway represents the central government administration in the county. The office of county governor is a government agency of the Kingdom of Norway; the title was Amtmann (before 1919), then Fylkesmann (from 1919 to 2020), and then Statsforvaltaren (since 2021).

The County Governor of Vestland is a position that was established on 1 January 2019 in preparation for the creation of the new Vestland county which was established on 1 January 2020 when the old Hordaland and Sogn og Fjordane counties were merged. The first county governor was Lars Sponheim who previously had served as the County Governor of Hordaland. The County Governor of Vestland is based at Leikanger, but will also have smaller annex offices located in Bergen and Førde.

The county governor is the government's representative in the county. The governor carries out the resolutions and guidelines of the Storting and government. This is done first by the county governor performing administrative tasks on behalf of the ministries. Secondly, the county governor also monitors the activities of the municipalities and is the appeal body for many types of municipal decisions.

== Names ==
The title of the office was originally Fylkesmann i Vestland but on 1 January 2021, the title was changed to the gender-neutral Statsforvaltaren i Vestland.

== List of county governors ==
Vestland county has had the following governors:

County governors of Vestland
Start	End	Name
1 January 2019	1 June 2022	Lars Sponheim (born 1957)
1 September 2022	present	Liv Signe Navarsete (born 1958)

== See also ==
- List of county governors of Hordaland
- List of county governors of Sogn og Fjordane
