= Non-Partisan Deputies =

Norwegian political party

The Non-Partisan Deputies (Norwegian: Tverrpolitisk folkevalgte, TVF), was a minor political party in Norway and the predecessor of the Coastal Party of Norway. The party emerged from the relatively small stratum of conservative EU critics during the 1994 Norwegian EU referendum who did not agree with the pro-EU politics of the Conservative Party. Harald B. Haram was party chairman until his death in 2002, when his son Harald Bernt Einar Haram replaced him.

== History ==
Formally, the party was founded in 1973 as the Women's Free Deputies (Kvinnenes Frie folkevalgte). In this phase, the party was based in Eastern Norway. The minor party was in 1992 taken over by people from Møre, led by Harald B. Haram. For the 1993 election, the party had changed its name and ran as the eurosceptic Freedom Party against the EC-Union (Frihetspartiet mot EF-unionen). During the 1994 Norwegian EU referendum, the party was however simply known as the Freedom Party (Frihetspartiet). In 1997, the name had changed again, now to the present Non-Partisan Deputies. In late 1998, the party again changed its name, to the Non-Partisan Coastal and Rural District Party (Tverrpolitisk kyst- og distriktsparti). This was however reverted to the Non-Partisan Deputies following the 2001 election.

Steinar Bastesen was elected to Stortinget on their ticket in 1997, but soon left the party to form the Coastal Party, for which he also spent his second period. However, in 2008 he was excluded from the Coastal Party, and soon after made his return to the Non-Partisan Deputies. Together with, among others, notable former Norwegian political TV host Per Ståle Lønning the party ran for the 2009 parliamentary election in the county of Nordland.
