= 2005 Norwegian parliamentary election =

- 11–12 September 2005

All 169 seats in the Storting 85 seats needed for a majority
- Registered: 3,421,741
- Turnout: 77.43% (▲1.89 pp)
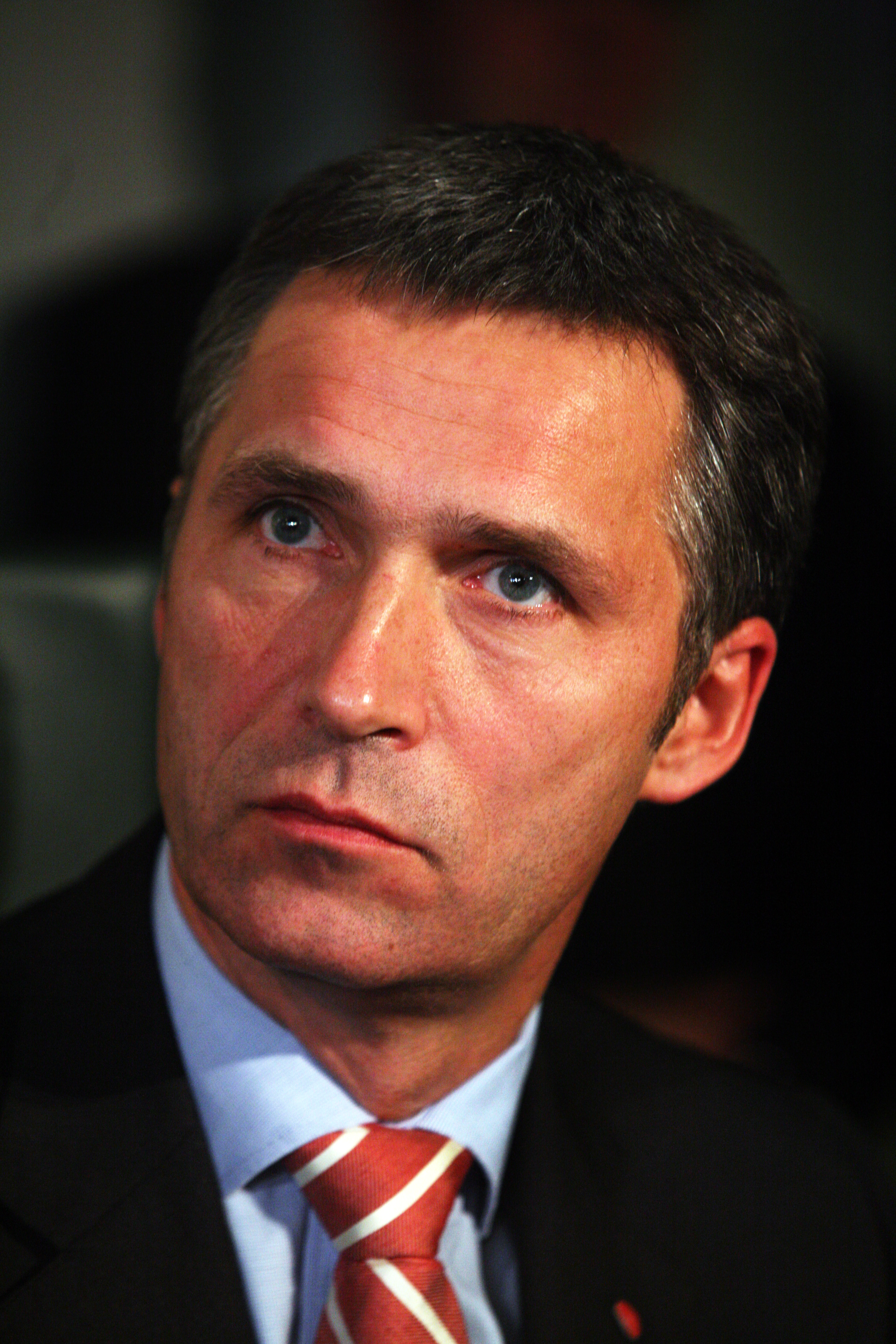

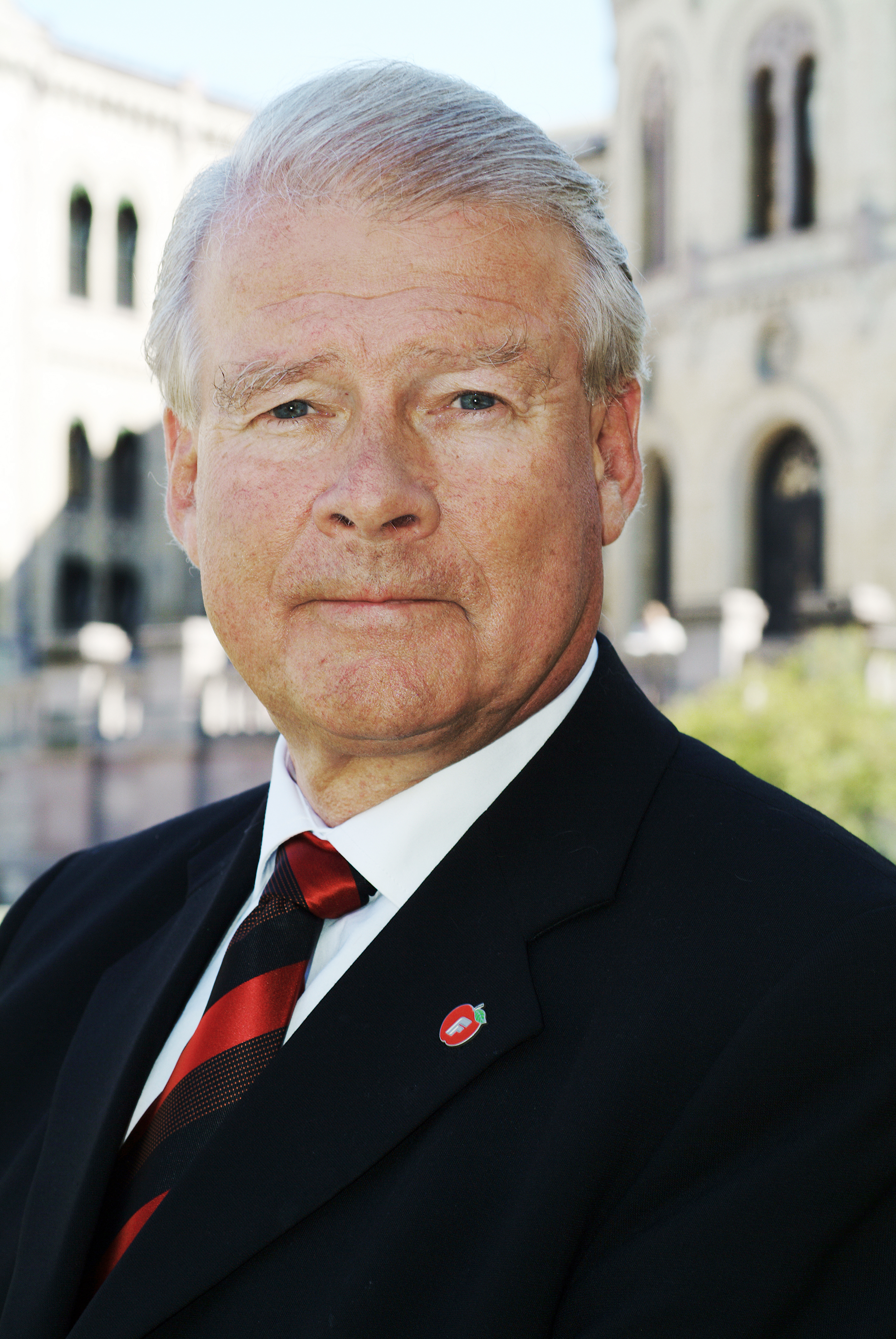

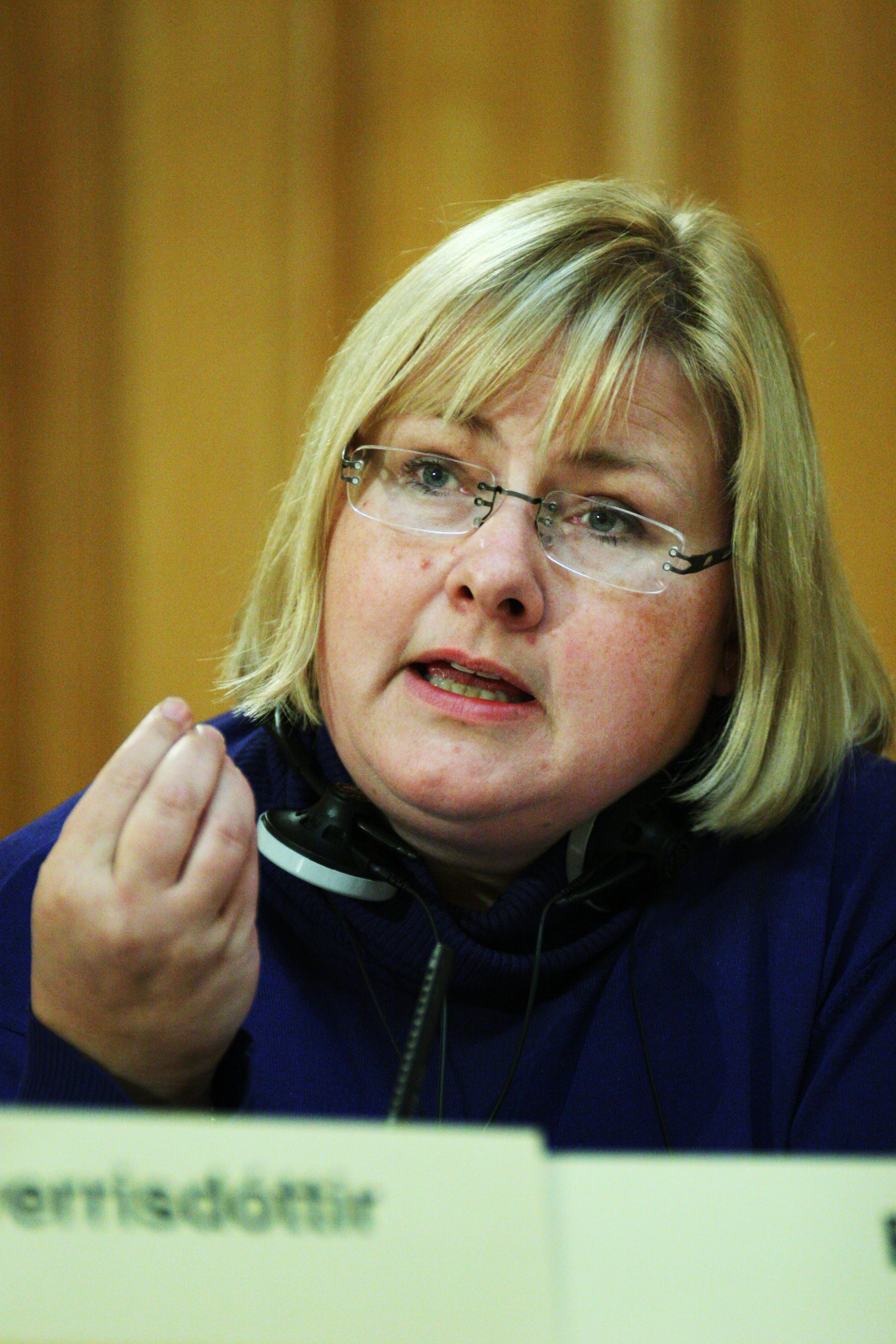

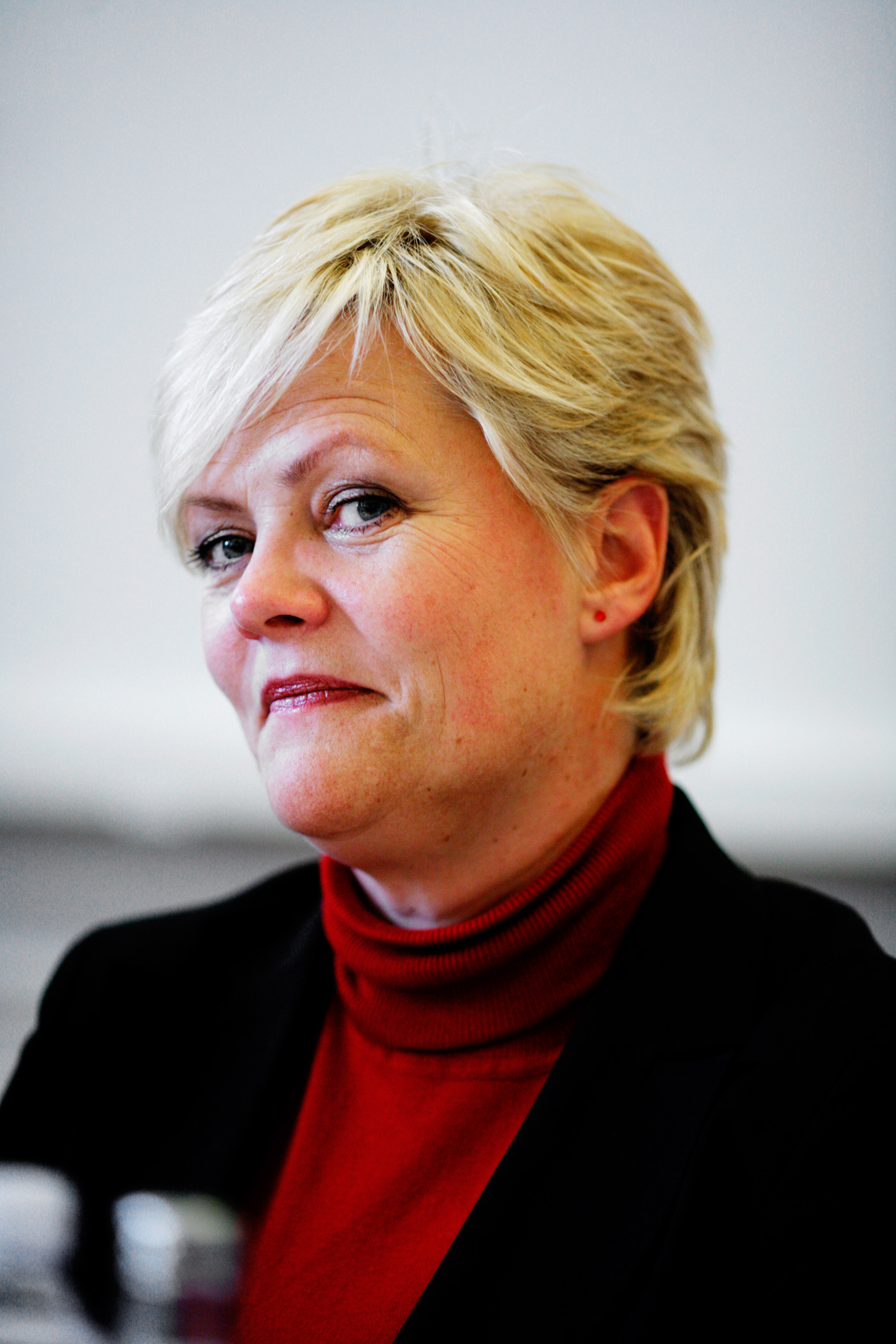

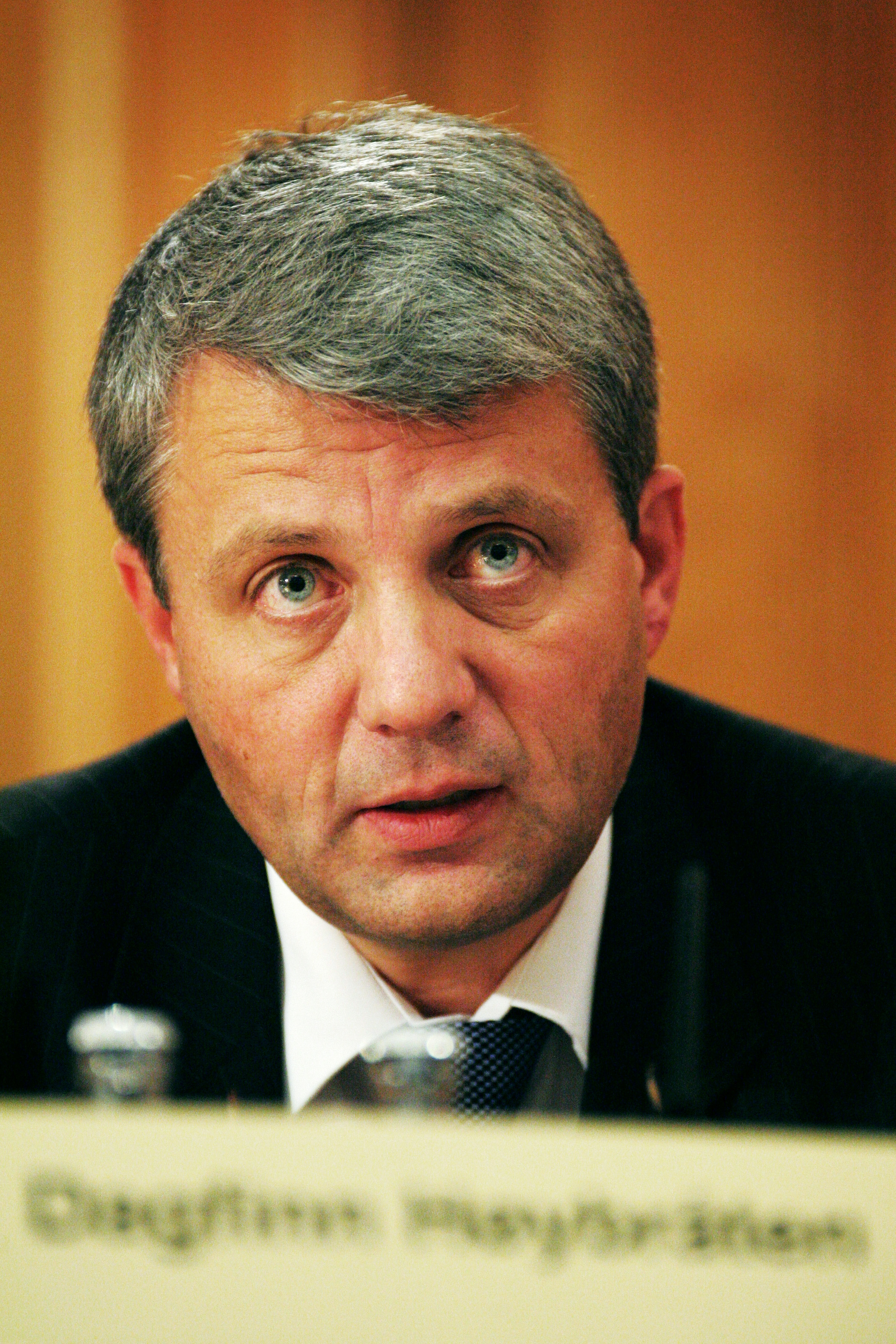

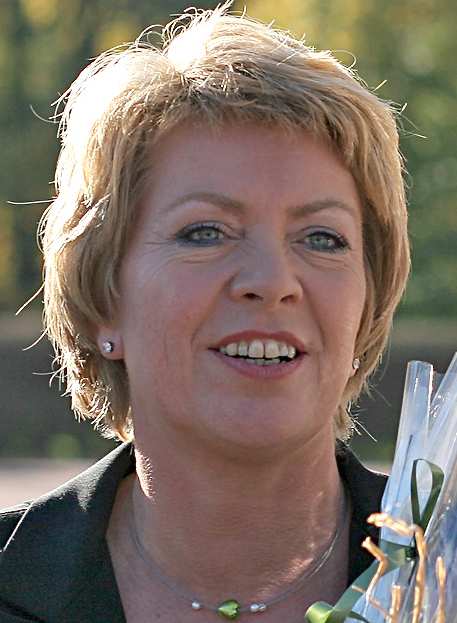

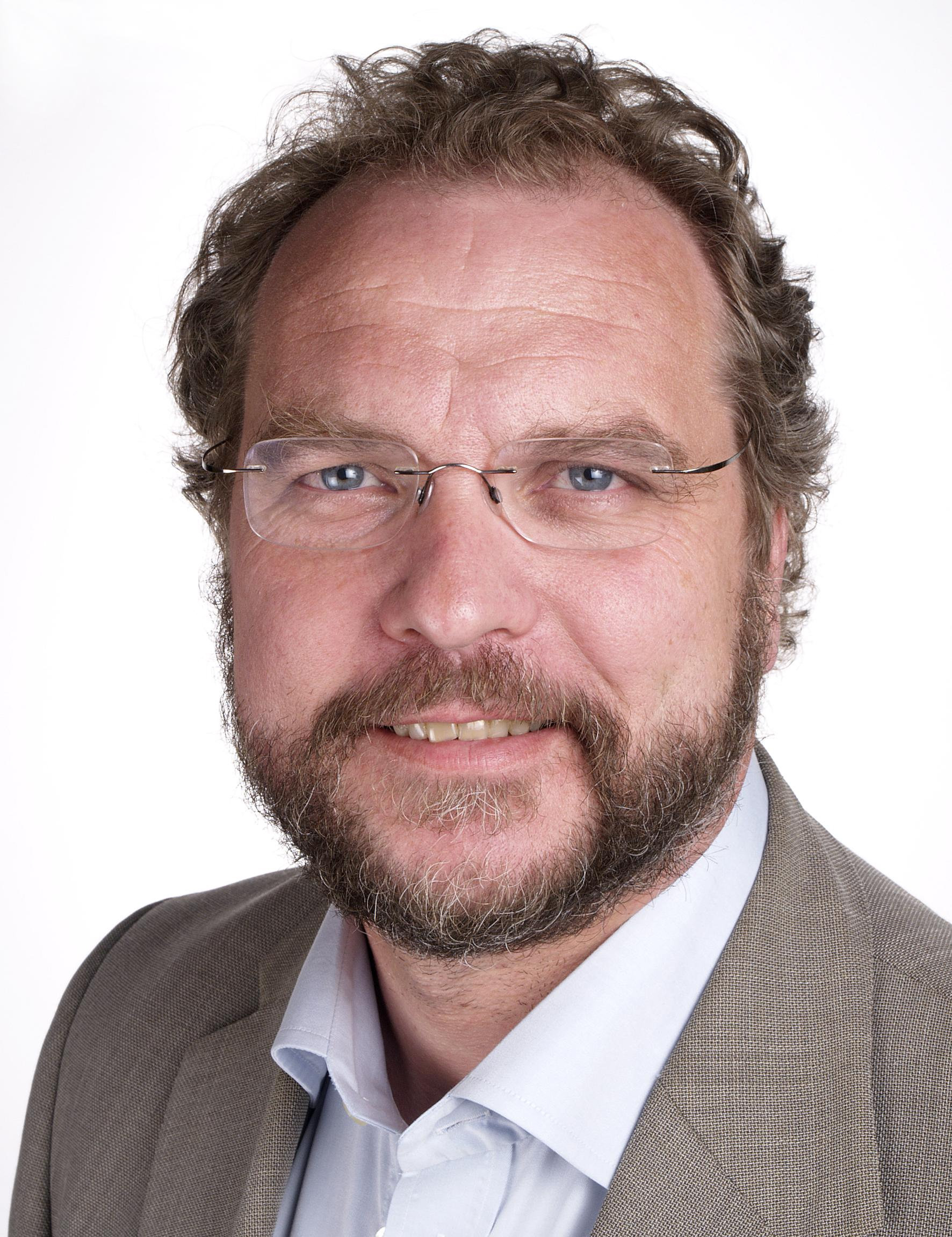
	First party	Second party	Third party
Leader	Jens Stoltenberg	Carl I. Hagen	Erna Solberg
Party	Labour	Progress	Conservative
Last election	24.29%, 43 seats	14.64%, 26 seats	21.21%, 38 seats
Seats won	61	38	23
Seat change	▲18	▲12	▼15
Popular vote	862,757	582,284	372,008
Percentage	32.69%	22.06%	14.10%
Swing	▲8.40 pp	▲7.42 pp	▼7.11 pp
	Fourth party	Fifth party	Sixth party
Leader	Kristin Halvorsen	Dagfinn Høybråten	Åslaug Haga
Party	Socialist Left	Christian Democratic	Centre
Last election	12.55%, 23 seats	12.41%, 22 seats	5.56%, 10 seats
Seats won	15	11	11
Seat change	▼8	▼11	▲1
Popular vote	232,971	178,885	171,063
Percentage	8.83%	6.78%	6.48%
Swing	▼3.72 pp	▼5.63 pp	▲0.92 pp
	Seventh party
Leader	Lars Sponheim
Party	Liberal
Last election	3.91%, 2 seats
Seats won	10
Seat change	▲8
Popular vote	156,113
Percentage	5.92%
Swing	▲2.01 pp
- Largest bloc and seats won by constituency
Prime Minister before election
Kjell Magne Bondevik
Christian Democratic
Prime Minister after election
Jens Stoltenberg
Labour

Parliamentary elections were held in Norway on 11 and 12 September 2005. The result was a victory for the opposition centre-left Red-Green Coalition, which received 48.0% of the votes and won 87 out of 169 seats, dominated by the Labour Party's 61 seats. The three-party centre-right government coalition won 44 seats and the right wing Progress Party won 38, becoming the largest opposition party. Voter turnout was 77.1%, an increase of 2 percentage points compared to the 2001 elections.

== Contesting parties ==
Name		Ideology	Position	Leader	2001 result	
Name		Ideology	Position	Leader	Votes (%)	Seats
Ap	Labour Party; Arbeiderpartiet	Social democracy	Centre-left	Jens Stoltenberg	24.2%	43 / 165
H	Conservative Party; Høyre	Liberal conservatism	Centre-right	Erna Solberg	21.2%	38 / 165
FrP	Progress Party; Fremskrittspartiet	Conservative liberalism	Right-wing	Carl I. Hagen	14.6%	26 / 165
SV	Socialist Left Party; Sosialistisk Venstreparti	Democratic socialism	Left-wing	Kristin Halvorsen	12.5%	23 / 165
KrF	Christian Democratic Party; Kristelig Folkeparti	Christian democracy	Centre to centre-right	Dagfinn Høybråten	12.4%	22 / 165
Sp	Centre Party; Senterpartiet	Agrarianism	Centre	Åslaug Haga	5.5%	10 / 165
V	Liberal Party; Venstre	Social liberalism	Centre	Lars Sponheim	3.9%	2 / 165
Kp	Coastal Party; Kystpartiet	Northern-regionalism	Centre to centre-right	Roy Waage	1.7%	1 / 165

== Campaign ==
Before the election, Prime Minister Kjell Magne Bondevik led a coalition government consisting of the Conservative Party (38 seats in parliament), Christian People's Party (22 seats and supplied the prime minister) and the Liberals (2 seats), with the conditional support of the right-wing Progress Party. Between them, the three main parties of the coalition held 62 seats in the outgoing 165-seat Storting. The Progress Party held an additional 26, giving the four parties a majority when acting together.

Divisions within the coalition led to the temporary withdrawal of support by the Progress Party in November 2004, in response to what they saw as the government's underfunding of hospitals; an agreement was later reached. The government also attracted criticism for its handling of the 2004 Indian Ocean earthquake, in which several Norwegians died, with the prime minister admitting to mistakes in his government's delayed reaction to the disaster.

The question of private schools was controversial in 2005, with the opposition Labour Party, Socialist Left Party and Centre Party rejecting the government's plan to allow schools other than those offering an "alternative education", or those founded on religious beliefs, to become private.

Amidst a decline in the personal popularity of the prime minister, opinion polls in early 2005 indicated a clear lead for the Labour Party. Its leader, Jens Stoltenberg, was prime minister from March 2000 to October 2001, and enjoyed widespread public support in the run-up to the election. Polling suggests that the Labour, Socialist Left and Centre parties could form a red–green coalition, which would command a majority in the Storting. Labour and Socialist Left have pledged to maintain their allegiance with the Centre party even if the latter were not necessary to obtain a majority.

In June the leader of the Progress Party, Carl I. Hagen, said his party would not support a new coalition if Bondevik re-emerges as the prime minister after the election, implicitly pointing at Erna Solberg, leader of the conservative party as a better candidate.

A week before the elections, the Socialist Left Party experienced a fall in popularity on recent polls. The Liberals and Conservative Party gained popularity on the polls. As of 11 September 2005, the day before the election, the opinion polls indicated a dead run between the red-green coalition and the right wing.

Advance voting was possible from 10 August to 9 September. 452,488 votes were cast in advance, a decrease of approx 52,000 since the 2001 election.

=== Slogans ===
Party	Original slogan	English translation
Labour Party	"Nytt flertall - ny solidaritet"	«New majority - new solidarity»
Progress Party		
Christian Democratic Party	"Bruk hjertet. Og hodet. Og stemmen"	«Use the heart. And the head. And your voice»
Conservative Party	Fortsatt fremgang	«Still progress»
Centre Party	Med hjerte for hele landet	«With heart for the whole country»
Socialist Left Party	Ulike mennesker, like muligheter	«Different people, same opportunities»
Liberal Party	Frihet og fellesskap, løsninger i sentrum	«Freedom and unity, solutions at the centre»
Red Electoral Alliance	Din sikring mot høyrevind	«Your security against right-wing»

=== Debates ===
2005 Norwegian general election debates
Date	Organisers	P Present I Invitee N Non-invitee									
Date	Organisers	Ap	Sp	H	Sv	KrF	Frp	V	Rv	Kp	Refs
9 September	NRK	P Jens Stoltenberg	P Åslaug Haga	P Erna Solberg	P Kristin Halvorsen	P Kjell Magne Bondevik, Dagfinn Høybråten	P Carl I. Hagen	P Lars Sponheim	P Torstein Dahle	P Roy Waage	
10 September	TV 2	P Jens Stoltenberg	P Åslaug Haga	P Erna Solberg	P Kristin Halvorsen	P Dagfinn Høybråten	P Carl I. Hagen	P Lars Sponheim	P Torstein Dahle	P Roy Waage	

== Results ==
Party	Votes	%	Seats	+/–
Labour Party	862,456	32.69	61	+18
Progress Party	581,896	22.06	38	+12
Conservative Party	371,948	14.10	23	–15
Socialist Left Party	232,971	8.83	15	–8
Christian Democratic Party	178,885	6.78	11	–11
Centre Party	171,063	6.48	11	+1
Liberal Party	156,113	5.92	10	+8
Red Electoral Alliance	32,355	1.23	0	0
Coastal Party	21,948	0.83	0	–1
Pensioners' Party	13,556	0.51	0	0
Christian Unity Party	3,911	0.15	0	0
Environment Party The Greens	3,652	0.14	0	0
Democrats	2,705	0.10	0	New
Abortion Opponents' List	1,934	0.07	0	New
Communist Party	1,070	0.04	0	0
Reform Party	727	0.03	0	New
Sámi People's Party	659	0.02	0	New
Liberal People's Party	213	0.01	0	0
Norwegian Republican Alliance	92	0.00	0	New
Beer Unity Party	65	0.00	0	New
Society Party	44	0.00	0	New
Total	2,638,263	100.00	169	+4
Valid votes	2,638,263	99.58		
Invalid/blank votes	11,257	0.42		
Total votes	2,649,520	100.00		
Registered voters/turnout	3,421,741	77.43		
Source: Nohlen & Stöver, European Elections Database

=== Voter demographics ===
Cohort	Percentage of cohort voting for							
Cohort	Ap	FrP	H	Sv	KrF	Sp	V	Others
Total vote	32.69%	22.06%	14.10%	8.83%	6.78%	6.48%	5.92%	
Gender
Females	35.5%	19.5%	12.1%	11.8%	8.1%	5.2%	5.6%	
Males	30.2%	24.4%	15.9%	6.1%	5.6%	7.6%	6.3%	
Age
18–30 years old	26.7%	29.5%	10.9%	15.9%	5.8%	5.4%	2.3%	
30-59 years old	32.9%	19.8%	16%	9.1%	5.9%	6.4%	7%	
60 years old and older	36%	22.7%	11.4%	3.5%	9.6%	7.4%	5.4%	
Work
low income	37.2%	24%	7%	9.6%	6.6%	7.2%	2.8%	
Average income	31.1%	24.2%	11.8%	8.4%	8.8%	7.3%	5.7%	
High income	30.8%	17.2%	24.1%	8.5%	4%	4.5%	9.7%	
Education
Primary school	42.2%	31%	4.7%	3.9%	4.3%	6.9%	1.3%	
High school	32.5%	27.2%	11.9%	6.2%	8.5%	7.7%	3.2%	
University/college	29.8%	13.7%	19.5%	13.2%	5.8%	5%	10.2%	
Source: Norwegian Institute for Social Research

=== Seat distribution ===
Constituency	Total seats	Seats won								
Constituency	Total seats	By party							By coalition	
Constituency	Total seats	Ap	FrP	H	SV	KrF	Sp	V	Borgerlig	Red-green
Akershus	16	5	4	4	1		1	1	9	7
Aust-Agder	4	2	1			1			2	2
Buskerud	9	4	2	1	1		1		3	6
Finnmark	5	2	1		1			1	2	3
Hedmark	8	4	1	1	1		1		2	6
Hordaland	15	4	3	3	1	2	1	1	9	6
Møre og Romsdal	9	2	2	1	1	1	1	1	5	4
Nord-Trøndelag	6	2	1		1		1	1	2	4
Nordland	10	4	2	1	1	1	1		4	6
Oppland	7	4	1	1			1		2	5
Oslo	17	6	3	3	2	1		2	9	8
Østfold	9	3	3	1	1	1			5	4
Rogaland	13	3	3	2	1	2	1	1	8	5
Sogn og Fjordane	5	2	1				1	1	2	3
Sør-Trøndelag	10	4	2	1	1	1	1		4	6
Telemark	6	3	2	1					3	3
Troms	7	3	2	1	1				3	4
Vest-Agder	6	1	2	1		1		1	5	1
Vestfold	7	3	2	1	1				3	4
Total	169	61	38	23	15	11	11	10	82	87
Source: Statistics Norway

=== Winners ===
Election results by county

- The red-green coalition was the winner of the election and formed a majority government, with Jens Stoltenberg as prime minister, on 17 October 2005, as soon as a national budget for 2006 had been proposed by the old government.
- The Labour Party obtained a result that brought it back into the position of "the largest Norwegian party, not just the largest of many middle-sized ones".
- The Progress Party obtained its best result ever, surpassing the Conservatives by a large margin and becoming almost as large as the parties in the Bondevik government combined.
- The Liberal Party gained a substantial number of seats in its most successful election since 1965. The large number of additional seats won with only a modest gain in votes came partly as a result of passing the threshold of 4% of the votes required for a party to be allocated leveling seats to bring their representation into proportion to the overall national vote (as opposed to direct regional mandates allocated on the basis of number of votes in the specific region). Venstre got six direct regional mandates and four allocated additional mandates.

=== Losers ===
- Non-socialist parties suffered a defeat well beyond its numbers, with almost half of its votes for the Progress party, which had been able to offer only external support to the Bondevik government; the other parties shunned any possible formal inclusion in the government coalition over differing views in several issues.
- The Socialist Left Party obtained only a disappointing result, after polls that showed the party well beyond 15% at times during the electoral campaign.
- The Conservative Party lost a large share of votes and are no longer the largest non-Socialist party, surpassed by the Progress Party.
- The Christian Democratic Party almost halved its votes, and suffered one of the worst defeats ever.
- The Coastal Party lost its only representative in the parliament.
- The Red Electoral Alliance did not manage to obtain a seat in the parliament.
