= Lars Sponheim =

Norwegian politician

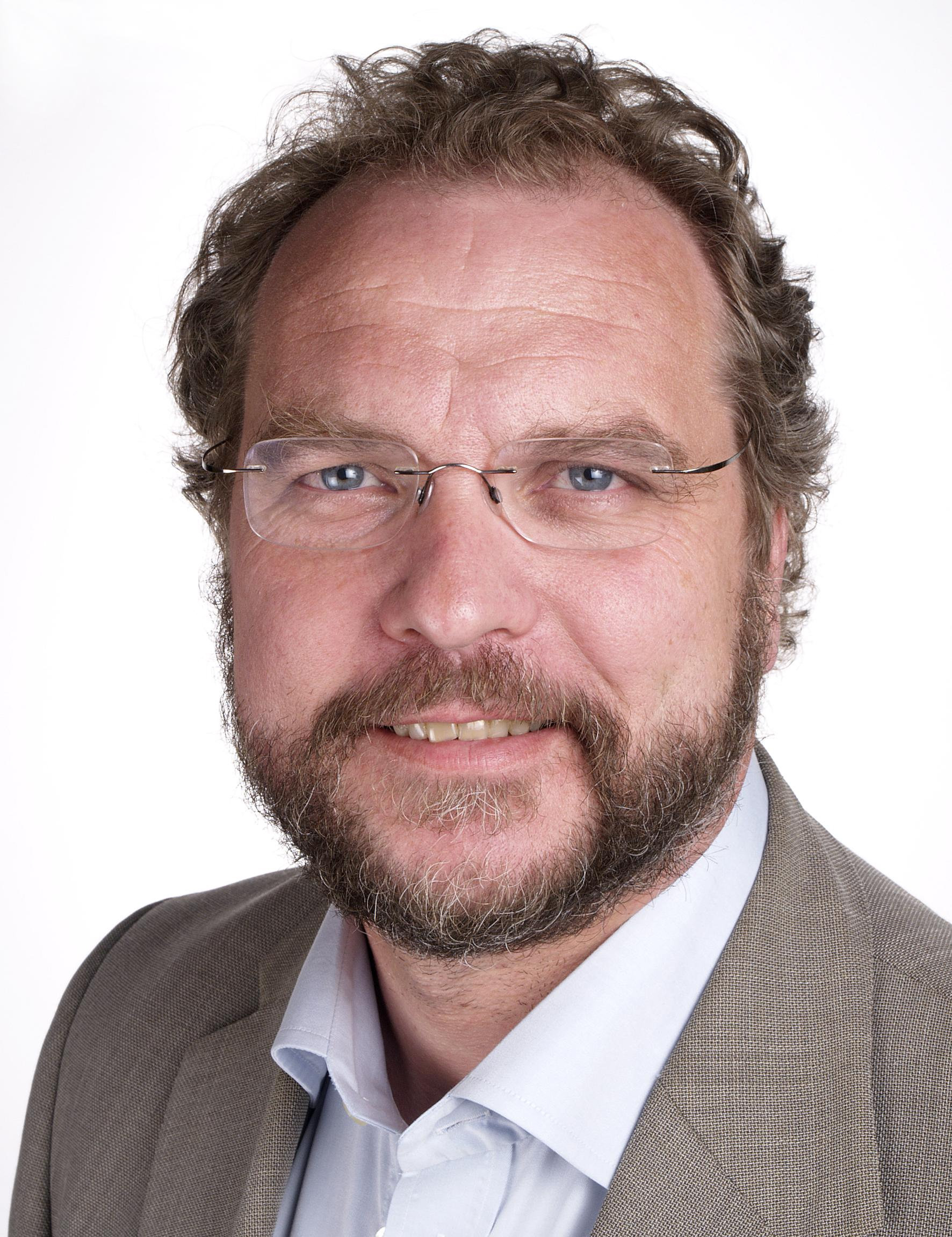
- Sponheim in 2004.

Member of the Storting
- In office 1 October 1993 – 30 September 2009
- Deputy: Harald Hove; May Britt Vihovde
- Constituency: Hordaland

Minister of Trade and Industry
- In office 17 October 1997 – 17 March 2000
- Prime Minister: Kjell Magne Bondevik
- Preceded by: Grete Knudsen
- Succeeded by: Grete Knudsen

Minister of Agriculture and Food
- In office 19 October 2001 – 17 October 2005
- Prime Minister: Kjell Magne Bondevik
- Preceded by: Bjarne Håkon Hanssen
- Succeeded by: Terje Riis-Johansen

Governor of Hordaland
- In office 1 June 2010 – 31 December 2018
- Monarch: Harald V
- Prime Minister: Jens Stoltenberg; Erna Solberg
- Preceded by: Svein Alsaker
- Succeeded by: Position abolished

Governor of Vestland
- In office 1 January 2019 – 1 June 2022
- Monarch: Harald V
- Prime Minister: Erna Solberg; Jonas Gahr Støre
- Preceded by: Position established
- Succeeded by: Liv Signe Navarsete

Leader of the Liberal Party
- In office 6 April 1996 – 17 April 2010
- Preceded by: Odd Einar Dørum
- Succeeded by: Trine Skei Grande

Personal details
- Born: 23 May 1957 (age 69) Halden, Østfold, Norway
- Party: Liberal
- Children: 3
- Education: Agricultural University of Norway

Lars Sponheim (born 23 May 1957) is a Norwegian politician. He was leader of the Liberal Party from 1996 to 2010. He was a member of the Storting from 1993 to 2009, and a government minister from 1997 to 2000 and from 2001 to 2005. He served as County Governor of Vestland from 2010 to 2022, having served as the County Governor of Hordaland from 2010 until the office was merged with that of neighboring Sogn og Fjordane in 2019.

Sponheim was born in Halden, Østfold. In 1981 he achieved a degree in agricultural science at the Agricultural University of Norway. From 1988 to 1991, he was mayor of Ulvik Municipality (his home municipality) in Hordaland. He is also a farmer, and with his family he runs the ancestral farm, Sponheim, in Ulvik. He was elected to parliament as the Liberal Party's only representative in the 1993 election. During his campaign he pledged that he would walk from his home in Ulvik to Oslo if elected, which he did. During his first term in parliament he tried to carve a place in Norwegian politics for the Liberal Party, who had been out of parliament since the 1985 election, and to make the party a potential partner in a new non-socialist government. In this he succeeded in the 1997 elections when the Liberal Party gained 5 new seats in parliament and became junior partner in the centrist first cabinet of Kjell Magne Bondevik. Sponheim became party leader in 1996, succeeding Odd Einar Dørum, before stepping down in 2010. He is the longest serving leader in the party's history.

In the first cabinet of Bondevik, from October 1997 to March 2000, Sponheim was Minister of Trade and Industry. His main project in this position was to reduce the number of laws and regulations restricting business, especially small business. In the second Bondevik cabinet, from October 2001 to October 2005, he was Minister of Agriculture and Food. He used this position to promote Norwegian food in general and local agricultural specialties in particular, and to implement reforms aimed at making Norwegian agriculture more competitive. He also gained much publicity for criticizing Norwegians traveling to Sweden in order to buy cheaper food, calling it "Harry".

Sponheim was elected to a fourth consecutive term in the Storting in the 2005 election.

In the 2009 election, the Liberal Party suffered a major defeat and lost eight out of their ten seats in parliament, including Sponheim's seat in Hordaland. Following this defeat, Sponheim announced on the election night that he would resign as party leader when the Liberal Party convenes in the spring 2010. On 19 March 2010, it was announced that Sponheim would become the new County Governor of Hordaland, replacing the retiring Svein Alsaker. As county governor, Sponheim came into a dispute with the Bergen city government when he agreed with the opposition that the 2011 budget for Bergen illegally considered extraordinary dividend from BKK as regular income, and not as income which must be used for investments.

On 2 March 2022, he announced that he would be retiring in early June and step down as county governor of Vestland. His successor, Liv Signe Navarsete, was nominated on 3 June and assumed office on 1 September.

Political offices
Preceded by Grete Knudsen	Minister of Trade and Industry; 1997–2000	Succeeded by Odd Eriksen
Preceded by Bjarne Håkon Hanssen	Minister of Agriculture and Food; 2001–2005	Succeeded by Terje Riis-Johansen
Party political offices
Preceded by Odd Einar Dørum	Chairman of the Norwegian Liberal Party; 1996–2010	Succeeded by Trine Skei Grande
Government offices
Preceded by Svein Alsaker	County Governor of Hordaland; 2010–2018	Office abolished (Merged into Vestland)
New office	County Governor of Vestland; 2019–2022	Succeeded by Liv Signe Navarsete
